= Usher discography =

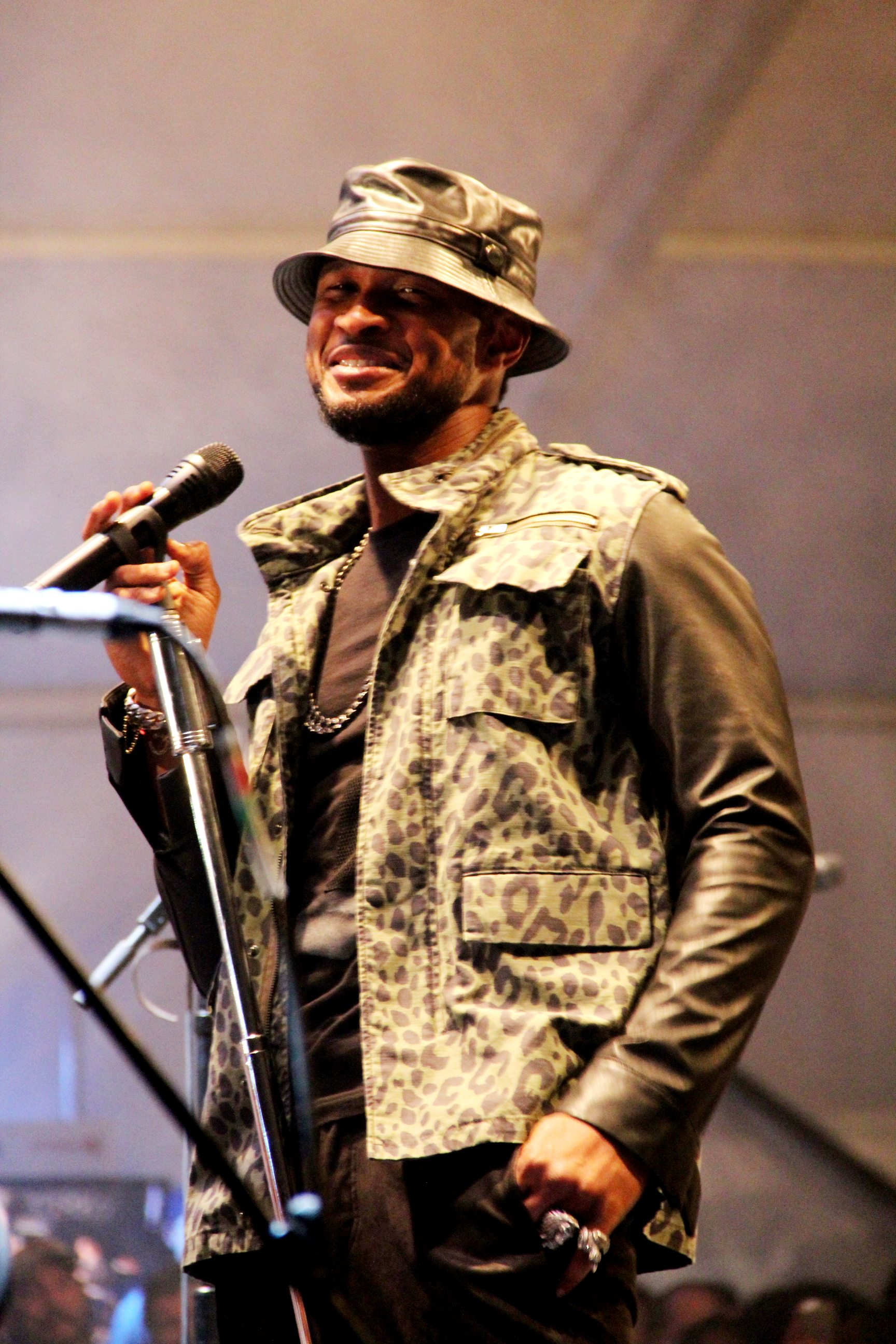
- Usher performing at the SXSW 2013
- Studio albums: 9
- Extended plays: 8
- Live albums: 1
- Compilation albums: 10
- Singles: 81
- Collaborative albums: 1
- Other charted songs: 34

American singer Usher has released nine studio albums, ten compilation albums, eight extended plays, and eighty-one singles (including nineteen as a featured artist). His music has been released on the LaFace, Arista, Jive, RCA, and gamma record labels.

Usher has sold more than 33 million albums in the United States alone and over 65 million albums worldwide. With over 100 million total records sold worldwide, he is one of the best selling music artists of all time. He has nine number 1 singles (all as a lead artist) and eighteen Hot 100 Top 10 singles on the US Billboard Hot 100. In 1994, Usher released his debut album Usher in North America, which sold 500,000 copies, and produced the singles "Can U Get wit It", "Think of You", and "The Many Ways". The former two peaked in the lower half of the UK and US charts. His follow-up 1997 album My Way sold over 8 million copies worldwide, becoming his breakthrough album. It is certified seven-times Platinum in the US, and spawned three successful singles, including his first UK number 1 song, "You Make Me Wanna...", and first US Hot 100 number 1 song, "Nice & Slow". Usher's success continued in 2001, with his third studio album, 8701. It debuted at number 4 on the Billboard 200. The album produced two number 1 singles, such as "U Remind Me" and "U Got It Bad". In 2002, the album was certified five-times Platinum in the US for sales of 5 million copies. As of 2010, its worldwide sales stand at over 8 million.

Usher's success increased in 2004, with the release of his fourth album, Confessions. It was his first US number 1 album and had the highest first-week sales for an R&B artist, with 1.1 million copies sold. It spawned four Hot 100 number 1 hits: "Yeah!", "Burn", "Confessions Part II", and "My Boo". "Yeah!" and "Burn" stayed atop the Hot 100 for a combined twenty weeks and were the best-selling singles of 2004, ranking first and second, respectively. Confessions received a Diamond certification from the Recording Industry Association of America (RIAA), and as of 2012, the album has sold over 20 million copies worldwide. Confessions is the best-selling R&B album of the 21st century and is also the best-selling album by a black artist this century. The album ranked second on the 2000–2009 Billboard 200 Decade-end chart. In 2008, Usher's fifth album Here I Stand followed. The album's lead single, "Love in This Club", topped the Hot 100, marking Usher's eighth number 1 on the chart. "Love in This Club Part II", the second single from Here I Stand, charted within America's Top 20 while its third single "Trading Places" reached number 6 in New Zealand as well as the Top 30 in Germany, Ireland, the Netherlands, and the United Kingdom. Here I Stand was certified two-times Platinum by the Recording Industry Association of America (RIAA). Its worldwide sales stand over 6 million copies, making it one of the most successful R&B albums of 2008.

In 2010, Usher released Raymond v. Raymond and it became his third consecutive number 1 album. The album produced five singles: "Papers", "Hey Daddy", "Lil Freak" and "There Goes My Baby" all reaching the Hot 100's top 40, while "Papers" and "There Goes My Baby" topped the Hot R&B/Hip-Hop Songs chart. The album's two other singles, "OMG" and "More", achieved worldwide success, with "OMG" topping the Hot 100 to give him his ninth number 1 single, and making Usher the first artist with Hot 100 number 1 singles in the 1990s, 2000s and 2010s. Raymond v. Raymond was certified three-times Platinum by the RIAA, and as of March 2012 has sold 1.3 million copies in the US. By the end of the year, it sold over 2 million copies worldwide and ranked as the ninth best-selling album of the year in the US. In the same year, a follow-up set titled Versus was released, and became Usher's sixth Top 10 album. The EP's lead single "DJ Got Us Fallin' in Love" reached the Top 10 in many countries and peaked at number 4 on the Billboard Hot 100. To date, Raymond v. Raymond, including its EP Verzuz, has sold an estimated 5 million copies worldwide, and nearly 2 million copies in the US, making it one of the best-selling albums in the 2010s decade by a black artist. Usher's seventh studio album Looking 4 Myself was released in June 2012 and became his fourth number 1 album in the US. Its first single "Climax" peaked in the Top 20 on the Hot 100, and topped the Hot R&B/Hip-Hop Songs chart for eleven weeks. The song also won him a Grammy at the 55th Grammy Awards for Best R&B Performance. The album's second single "Scream" reached the Top 10 in various countries, including the US, Canada and the UK. In 2014, Usher released "Good Kisser", "She Came to Give It to You" and "I Don't Mind" as successes in the UK, with the latter reaching high on the Hot 100 and topping the Hot R&B/Hip-Hop Songs to give him his thirteenth number 1 on that chart, tying him with Michael Jackson and Marvin Gaye.

Usher released his eighth album, Hard II Love (2016), which became his seventh Top 5 album on the Billboard 200. It was led by the Hot 100 Top 40 hit "No Limit" and Australian Top 10 hit "Crash". In 2018, Usher collaborated with Zaytoven to release his first collaborative extended project titled A. It debuted and peaked at number 31 on the Billboard 200 chart, with the song "Peace Sign" released as the only single.

In February 2024, Usher released his ninth album, Coming Home. The album debuted at number 2 on the US Billboard 200 and was supported by the Top 40 single, "Good Good", in which peaked at number 25 on the Billboard Hot 100.

== Albums ==
=== Studio albums ===
List of studio albums, with selected chart positions, sales figures and certifications
Title	Album details	Peak chart positions										Sales	Certifications
Title	Album details	US	US R&B/ HH	AUS	CAN	GER	IRL	NL	NZ	SWI	UK	Sales	Certifications
Usher	Released: August 30, 1994 (US); Label: LaFace; Formats: CD, digital download	167	25	—	—	—	—	—	—	—	—	US: 500,000 (Note: Sales as of 2010.)	
My Way	Released: September 16, 1997 (US); Label: LaFace; Format: CD, digital download	4	1	37	13	41	—	30	21	20	16	US: 6,000,000 (Note: Sales as of 2005.)	RIAA: 7× Platinum; BPI: Gold; MC: 2× Platinum; NVPI: Gold; ARIA: Gold; RMNZ: Gold
8701	Released: August 7, 2001 (US); Label: Arista; Format: CD, digital download	4	3	7	1	7	9	7	8	10	1	US: 4,700,000; UK: 753,000	RIAA: 5× Platinum; ARIA: 2× Platinum; BPI: 2× Platinum; BVMI: Gold; IFPI SWI: Gold; RMNZ: Platinum
Confessions	Released: March 23, 2004 (US); Label: Arista; Format: CD, digital download	1	1	2	1	2	1	3	1	3	1	US: 10,300,000	RIAA: Diamond (14× Platinum); ARIA: 5× Platinum; BPI: 6× Platinum; BVMI: Gold; IFPI SWI: Platinum; MC: 7× Platinum; NVPI: Gold; RMNZ: 7× Platinum
Here I Stand	Released: May 27, 2008 (US); Label: LaFace; Format: CD, digital download	1	1	1	1	10	2	5	5	4	1	US: 1,308,000 (Note: Sales as of 2012.)	RIAA: 2× Platinum; ARIA: Gold; BPI: Gold; IRMA: Gold; RMNZ: Platinum
Raymond v. Raymond	Released: March 30, 2010 (US); Label: LaFace, Jive; Format: CD, digital download	1	1	2	4	47	17	34	8	20	2	US: 1,300,000	RIAA: 3× Platinum; ARIA: Platinum; BPI: Platinum; MC: Platinum; RMNZ: 3× Platinum
Looking 4 Myself	Released: June 11, 2012 (US); Label: RCA; Format: CD, digital download	1	1	3	7	8	11	4	11	5	3	US: 504,000 (Note: Sales as of 2014.)	RIAA: Platinum; BPI: Gold; MC: Gold; RMNZ: Gold
Hard II Love	Released: September 16, 2016 (US); Label: RCA; Format: CD, digital download	5	2	5	20	55	77	38	— (Note: Hard II Love did not enter the NZ Top 40 Albums Chart, but peaked at number one on the NZ Heatseekers Albums chart.)	18	7	US: 28,000	RIAA: Gold
Coming Home	Released: February 9, 2024 (US); Label: Mega/Gamma; Format: CD, digital download	2	2	46	24	61	—	19	22	24	24	US: 53,000	
"—" denotes a recording that did not chart in that territory.

=== Collaborative albums ===
List of collaborative albums, with selected chart positions
Title	Album details	Peak chart positions		
Title	Album details	US	US R&B/ HH	NL
A (with Zaytoven)	Released: October 12, 2018 (US); Label: RCA; Format: CD, Digital download	31	19	135

=== Compilation albums ===
List of compilation albums, with selected details
Title	Album details
Usher	Released: January 1, 2004 (US); Label: MCP; Format: CD
My Megamix	Released: November 22, 2004 (US); Label: Street Dance; Format: CD
Rarities	Released: November 24, 2004 (US); Label: LaFace; Format: CD
Sex Appeal	Released: May 30, 2005 (US); Label: Central Station Records; Format: CD
And the Winner Is	Released: June 13, 2005 (US); Label: Hard Trax; Format: CD, digital download
Usher and Friends	Released: July 5, 2005 (US); Label: K-Town; Format: CD, digital download
Usher and Friends, Vol. 2	Released: July 5, 2005 (US); Label: K-Town; Format: CD, digital download
My Way / 8701	Released: September 5, 2005 (US); Label: Arista; Format: CD
Usher and Friends, Vol. 1–2	Released: August 3, 2007 (US); Label: Snapper PLC; Format: CD
Essential Mixes	Released: September 20, 2010 (US); Label: LaFace; Format: CD, digital download

=== Live albums ===
List of compilation albums, with selected details
Title	Album details	Certifications
Live	Released: March 23, 1999 (US); Label: Laface; Format: CD	RIAA: Gold

== Extended plays ==
List of extended plays, with selected chart positions and sales figures
Title	EP details	Peak chart positions						Sales
Title	EP details	US	US R&B/ HH	CAN	GER	NL	SWI	Sales
Usher: Rarities!	Released: February 11, 2004 (US); Label: LaFace; Format: CD, digital download	—	—	—	—	—	—	
Rhythm City, Vol. 1 – Caught Up	Released: March 8, 2005 (US); Label: LaFace; Format: CD, digital download	—	—	—	—	—	—	
Moving Mountains	Released: May 13, 2008 (US); Label: LaFace; Format: CD, digital download	—	—	—	—	—	—	
OMG (Remixes)	Released: June 5, 2010 (US); Label: LaFace; Format: CD, digital download	—	—	—	—	—	—	
Versus	Released: August 24, 2010 (US); Label: LaFace; Format: CD, digital download	4	3	12	35	40	53	US: 302,000
DJ Got Us Fallin' in Love (Remixes)	Released: September 24, 2010 (US); Label: LaFace; Format: CD, digital download	—	—	—	—	—	—	
More (Club Remixes)	Released: January 6, 2011 (US); Label: LaFace; Format: CD, digital download	—	—	—	—	—	—	
iTunes Festival: London 2012	Released: August 31, 2012 (UK); Label: RCA; Format: Digital download	—	—	—	—	—	—	
"—" denotes a recording that did not chart in that territory.

== Singles ==
=== As lead artist ===
List of singles as lead artist, with selected chart positions and certifications, showing year released and album name
Title	Year	Peak chart positions										Certifications	Album
Title	Year	US	US R&B/ HH	AUS	CAN	GER	IRL	NL	NZ	SWI	UK	Certifications	Album
"Call Me a Mack"	1993	—	56	—	—	—	—	—	—	—	—		Poetic Justice
"Can U Get wit It"	1994	59	13	—	—	—	—	—	—	—	87		Usher
"Think of You"	1994	58	8	—	—	—	—	—	—	—	70		Usher
"The Many Ways"	1995	— (Note: "The Many Ways" did not enter the Billboard Hot 100, but peaked at number nine on the Bubbling Under Hot 100 chart.)	42	—	—	—	—	—	—	—	—		Usher
"Comin' for X-Mas?"	1995	—	— (Note: "Comin' for X-Mas?" did not enter the Hot R&B/Hip-Hop Songs chart, but peaked at number one on the Bubbling Under R&B/Hip-Hop Singles chart.)	—	—	—	—	—	—	—	—		Non-album single
"You Make Me Wanna..."	1997	2	1	6	17	18	9	6	15	12	1	RIAA: 3× Platinum; ARIA: Platinum; BPI: Platinum; RMNZ: 2× Platinum	My Way
"Nice & Slow"	1998	1	1	44	6	—	—	20	7	—	24	RIAA: 3× Platinum; BPI: Silver; RMNZ: Platinum	My Way
"My Way"	1998	2	4	48	—	49	—	21	17	—	—	RIAA: Platinum	My Way
"Pop Ya Collar"	2000	60	25	25	—	30	33	16	—	36	2	BPI: Silver	8701 (international edition)
"U Remind Me"	2001	1	1	4	3	21	25	4	3	22	3	RIAA: 2× Platinum; ARIA: 2× Platinum; BPI: Platinum; BVMI: Gold; RMNZ: 3× Platinum	8701
"U Got It Bad"	2001	1	1	3	17	26	36	20	3	13	5	RIAA: 5× Platinum; ARIA: 2× Platinum; BPI: Platinum; RMNZ: 2× Platinum	8701
"U Don't Have to Call"	2002	3	2	—	—	—	—	—	27	—	4	RIAA: Platinum; RMNZ: Gold	8701
"U-Turn"	2002	—	—	7	—	51	—	27	—	22	16		8701
"Can U Help Me"	2002	—	57	—	—	—	—	—	—	—	—		8701
"Yeah!" (featuring Lil Jon and Ludacris)	2004	1	1	1	1	1	1	1	1	1	1	RIAA: Diamond (13× Platinum); ARIA: 9× Platinum; BPI: 4× Platinum; BVMI: 5× Gold; IFPI SWI: Gold; MC: Diamond; RMNZ: 7× Platinum	Confessions
"Burn"	2004	1	1	2	—	11	2	9	1	10	1	RIAA: 4× Platinum; ARIA: 2× Platinum; BPI: Platinum; MC: Platinum; RMNZ: 3× Platinum	Confessions
"Confessions Part II"	2004	1	1	5	7	4	7	14	—	—	5 (Note: "Confessions Part II" and "My Boo" were released as a double A-side single in the UK.)	RIAA: 3× Platinum; ARIA: Platinum; BPI: Platinum; MC: Platinum; RMNZ: 2× Platinum	Confessions
"My Boo" (with Alicia Keys)	2004	1	1	—	1	4	7	5	—	3	5	RIAA: 5× Platinum; BPI: Platinum; BVMI: Gold; MC: 3× Platinum; RMNZ: 4× Platinum	Confessions
"Caught Up"	2005	8	13	15	—	26	17	12	12	22	9	RIAA: Platinum; ARIA: Platinum; BPI: Gold; MC: Gold; RMNZ: Platinum	Confessions
"Same Girl" (with R. Kelly)	2007	20	4	47	—	—	20	—	4	—	26	ARIA: Gold; BPI: Silver; RMNZ: Platinum	Double Up
"Love in This Club" (featuring Young Jeezy)	2008	1	1	8	6	5	3	47	1	9	4	RIAA: 5× Platinum; ARIA: 2× Platinum; BPI: Platinum; RMNZ: 4× Platinum	Here I Stand
"Love in This Club Part II" (featuring Beyoncé and Lil Wayne)	2008	18	7	96	69	—	—	—	—	—	—	RIAA: Platinum; RMNZ: Platinum	Here I Stand
"Moving Mountains"	2008	67	18	36	—	28	26	21	6	—	25	RIAA: Platinum; ARIA: Gold; RMNZ: Gold	Here I Stand
"What's Your Name" (featuring will.i.am)	2008	—	—	91	84	—	—	—	—	—	—		Here I Stand
"Here I Stand"	2008	— (Note: "Here I Stand" did not enter the Billboard Hot 100, but peaked at number six on the Bubbling Under Hot 100 chart.)	18	—	—	—	—	—	—	—	—		Here I Stand
"Trading Places"	2008	45	4	—	—	—	—	—	—	—	—	RIAA: Platinum	Here I Stand
"Papers"	2009	31	1	—	—	—	—	—	—	—	—	RIAA: Gold	Raymond v. Raymond
"Hey Daddy (Daddy's Home)" (featuring Plies)	2009	24	2	—	—	—	—	—	—	—	—	RIAA: 2× Platinum; BPI: Silver; RMNZ: 2× Platinum	Raymond v. Raymond
"Lil Freak" (featuring Nicki Minaj)	2010	40	8	—	—	—	—	—	—	—	109	RIAA: Platinum	Raymond v. Raymond
"OMG" (featuring will.i.am)	2010	1	3	1	2	27	1	39	1	38	1	RIAA: 8× Platinum; ARIA: 6× Platinum; BPI: 2× Platinum; BVMI: Gold; MC: 2× Platinum; RMNZ: 3× Platinum	Raymond v. Raymond
"There Goes My Baby"	2010	25	1	—	—	—	—	—	—	—	138	RIAA: 2× Platinum	Raymond v. Raymond
"DJ Got Us Fallin' in Love" (featuring Pitbull)	2010	4	51	3	2	5	6	4	4	4	7	RIAA: 8× Platinum; ARIA: 6× Platinum; BPI: 2× Platinum; BVMI: 2× Platinum; IFPI SWI: Platinum; MC: 2× Platinum; RMNZ: 4× Platinum	Versus
"Hot Tottie" (featuring Jay-Z)	2010	21	9	—	62	—	—	—	—	—	104	RIAA: Gold	Versus
"Lay You Down"	2010	—	56	—	—	—	—	—	—	—	—		Versus
"More"	2010	15	—	7	1	7	25	4	13	2	23	ARIA: 3× Platinum; BPI: Silver; BVMI: Gold; IFPI SWI: Platinum; RMNZ: Gold	Raymond v. Raymond
"Dirty Dancer" (with Enrique Iglesias featuring Lil Wayne)	2011	18	—	24	11	17	22	39	22	30	21	RIAA: Gold; ARIA: Platinum; MC: Platinum	Euphoria
"Climax"	2012	17	1	29	96	—	69	82	—	—	4	RIAA: 3× Platinum; ARIA: Platinum; BPI: Silver; MC: Gold; RMNZ: Gold	Looking 4 Myself
"Scream"	2012	9	— (Note: "Scream" did not enter the Hot R&B/Hip-Hop Songs chart, but peaked at number 18 on the Bubbling Under R&B/Hip-Hop Singles chart.)	11	4	17	23	28	21	18	5	RIAA: 3× Platinum; RIAA: Platinum; ARIA: 2× Platinum; BPI: Platinum; BVMI: Gold; MC: 3× Platinum; RMNZ: Platinum	Looking 4 Myself
"Lemme See" (featuring Rick Ross)	2012	46	2	—	—	—	—	—	—	—	90	RIAA: Platinum	Looking 4 Myself
"Numb"	2012	69	—	39	41	24	—	61	—	—	—	ARIA: Gold; MC: Gold	Looking 4 Myself
"Dive"	2012	—	34	—	—	—	—	—	—	—	—		Looking 4 Myself
"Good Kisser" (Note: "Good Kisser" was originally intended to be the lead single from Usher's eighth studio album, Hard II Love (2016), but was cut from the standard edition track listing, only being included on the Japanese edition of the album.)	2014	65	17	44	—	—	—	89	—	—	10	RIAA: Platinum; BPI: Silver	Hard II Love
"She Came to Give It to You" (featuring Nicki Minaj) (Note: "She Came to Give It to You" was originally intended to be the second single from Usher's eighth studio album, Hard II Love (2016), but was cut from the standard edition track listing, only being included on the Japanese edition of the album.)	2014	89	27	32	56	30	76	—	—	74	16	ARIA: Platinum	Hard II Love
"I Don't Mind" (featuring Juicy J)	2014	11	1	80	70	—	67	64	—	—	8	RIAA: 4× Platinum; ARIA: Platinum; BPI: Platinum; RMNZ: 2× Platinum	Non-album singles
"Chains" (featuring Nas and Bibi Bourelly)	2015	—	—	—	—	—	—	—	—	—	—		Non-album singles
"No Limit" (featuring Young Thug)	2016	32	9	—	—	—	—	—	—	—	—	RIAA: 2× Platinum; ARIA: Gold; MC: Gold; RMNZ: Gold	Hard II Love
"Crash"	2016	—	— (Note: "Crash" did not enter the Hot R&B/Hip-Hop Songs chart, but peaked at number three on the Bubbling Under R&B/Hip-Hop Singles chart.)	10	—	—	—	—	—	—	63	ARIA: 2× Platinum; BPI: Silver	Hard II Love
"Missin U"	2016	—	—	—	—	—	—	—	—	—	—		Hard II Love
"Rivals" (featuring Future)	2016	—	— (Note: "Rivals" did not enter the Hot R&B/Hip-Hop Songs chart, but peaked at number eight on the Bubbling Under R&B/Hip-Hop Singles chart.)	—	—	—	—	—	— (Note: "Rivals" did not enter the NZ Top 40 Singles Chart, but peaked at number eight on the NZ Heatseekers Singles Chart.)	—	—	RIAA: Gold	Hard II Love
"Peace Sign"	2018	—	—	—	—	—	—	—	—	—	—		A
"LaLaLa" (with Black Coffee)	2019	—	—	—	—	—	—	—	—	—	—		Subconsciously
"Come Thru" (with Summer Walker)	2019	42	23	—	65	—	—	—	—	—	42	RIAA: Platinum; ARIA: Platinum; BPI: Gold; MC: Platinum; RMNZ: Platinum	Over It
"Don't Waste My Time" (featuring Ella Mai)	2019	— (Note: "Don't Waste My Time" did not enter the Billboard Hot 100, but peaked at number seven on the Bubbling Under Hot 100 chart.)	—	—	—	—	—	—	— (Note: "Don't Waste My Time" did not enter the NZ Top 40 Singles Chart, but peaked at number 19 on the NZ Hot Singles Chart.)	—	—	RIAA: Gold	Non-album singles
"SexBeat" (featuring Lil Jon and Ludacris)	2020	—	—	—	—	—	—	—	— (Note: "SexBeat" did not enter the NZ Top 40 Singles Chart, but peaked at number 30 on the NZ Hot Singles Chart.)	—	—		Non-album singles
"California" (featuring Tyga)	2020	—	—	—	—	—	—	—	—	—	—		Non-album singles
"I Cry"	2020	—	—	—	—	—	—	—	—	—	—		Non-album singles
"Bad Habits"	2020	— (Note: "Bad Habits" did not enter the Billboard Hot 100, but peaked at number 17 on the Bubbling Under Hot 100 chart.)	49	—	—	—	—	—	—	—	— (Note: "Bad Habits" did not enter the UK Singles Chart, but peaked at number 84 on the UK Singles Downloads Chart.)	RIAA: Gold	Non-album singles
"Glu"	2023	—	47	—	—	—	—	—	— (Note: "Glu" did not enter the NZ Top 40 Singles Chart, but peaked at number 35 on the NZ Hot Singles Chart.)	—	—		Non-album singles
"Good Good" (with Summer Walker and 21 Savage)	2023	25	7	—	—	—	—	—	— (Note: "Good Good" did not enter the NZ Top 40 Singles Chart, but peaked at number seven on the NZ Hot Singles Chart.)	—	—	RMNZ: Gold	Coming Home
"Boyfriend"	2023	—	—	—	—	—	—	—	—	—	— (Note: "Boyfriend" did not enter the UK Singles Chart but peaked at number 97 on the UK Singles Downloads Chart Top 100.)		Non-album singles
"Dientes" (with J Balvin and DJ Khaled)	2023	— (Note: "Dientes" did not enter the Billboard Hot 100, but peaked at number 24 on the Bubbling Under Hot 100 chart.)	—	—	—	—	—	—	—	—	—		Non-album singles
"Transparency" (with 2 Chainz and Lil Wayne)	2023	—	35	—	—	—	—	—	—	—	—		Welcome 2 Collegrove
"Ruin" (with Pheelz)	2024	— (Note: "Ruin" did not enter the Billboard Hot 100, but peaked at number six on the Bubbling Under Hot 100 chart.)	47	—	—	—	—	—	—	—	—		Coming Home
"Kissing Strangers"	2024	— (Note: "Kissing Strangers" did not enter the Billboard Hot 100, but peaked at number five on the Bubbling Under Hot 100 chart.)	—	—	—	—	—	—	— (Note: "Kissing Strangers" did not enter the NZ Top 40 Singles Chart, but peaked at number 14 on the NZ Hot Singles Chart.)	—	— (Note: "Kissing Strangers" did not enter the UK Singles Chart Top 100 but peaked at number 21 on the UK Singles Downloads Chart.)		Coming Home
"—" denotes a recording that did not chart in that territory.

=== As featured artist ===
List of singles as featured artist, with selected chart positions and certifications, showing year released and album name
Title	Year	Peak chart positions										Certifications	Album
Title	Year	US	US R&B/ HH	US Rap	AUS	FRA	NL	NZ	SWE	SWI	UK	Certifications	Album
"The Party Continues" (Jermaine Dupri featuring Usher and Da Brat)	1998	29	14	6	—	—	—	—	—	—	—		Life in 1472
"Feels Good" (Cam'ron featuring Usher)	1998	—	54	—	—	—	—	—	—	—	—		Confessions of Fire
"I Need a Girl (Part One)" (P. Diddy featuring Usher and Loon)	2002	2	2	1	5	9	5	9	17	5	4	ARIA: Gold; IFPI SWI: Gold; RMNZ: Gold	We Invented the Remix
"What More Can I Give" (as part of The All Stars)	2003	—	—	—	—	—	—	—	—	—	—		Non-album single
"Lovers and Friends" (Lil Jon & The East Side Boyz featuring Usher and Ludacris)	2004	3	2	1	36	—	—	15	—	44	10	RMNZ: Gold	Crunk Juice
"Spotlight" (Gucci Mane featuring Usher)	2009	42	15	8	—	—	—	—	—	—	46	RIAA: Gold	The State vs. Radric Davis
"Fed Up" (DJ Khaled featuring Usher, Drake, Young Jeezy, and Rick Ross)	2009	— (Note: "Fed Up" did not enter the Billboard Hot 100, but peaked at number eight on the Bubbling Under Hot 100 Singles chart.)	45	22	—	—	—	—	—	—	—		Victory
"We Are the World 25 for Haiti" (Artists for Haiti)	2010	2	—	—	18	—	—	8	5	—	50		Non-album single
"Somebody to Love (Remix)" (Justin Bieber featuring Usher)	2010	15	—	—	20	—	—	—	54	—	—	RIAA: Platinum; ARIA: Platinum; RMNZ: 2× Platinum	Never Say Never: The Remixes
"Promise" (Romeo Santos featuring Usher)	2011	83	—	—	—	—	—	—	—	—	—	RIAA: 19× Platinum (Latin)	Formula, Vol. 1
"Without You" (David Guetta featuring Usher)	2011	4	—	—	6	6	5	5	6	3	6	RIAA: 2× Platinum; ARIA: 4× Platinum; BPI: 2× Platinum; BVMI: Gold; IFPI SWI: Platinum; RMNZ: 3× Platinum	Nothing but the Beat
"Touch'N You" (Rick Ross featuring Usher)	2012	— (Note: "Touch'N You" did not enter the Billboard Hot 100, but peaked at number two on the Bubbling Under Hot 100 Singles chart.)	15	15	—	—	—	—	—	—	—		God Forgives, I Don't
"Rest of My Life" (Ludacris featuring Usher and David Guetta)	2012	72	—	—	16	152	—	19	—	42	41	ARIA: Platinum; RMNZ: Gold	Fast & Furious 6 (Original Motion Picture Soundtrack)
"New Flame" (Chris Brown featuring Usher and Rick Ross)	2014	27	6	—	61	75	—	35	—	—	10	RIAA: 4× Platinum; ARIA: Platinum; BPI: Gold; RMNZ: 3× Platinum	X
"Body Language" (Kid Ink featuring Usher and Tinashe)	2014	72	21	14	—	104	—	—	—	—	46	RIAA: Platinum; ARIA: Gold; BPI: Silver; MC: Gold; RMNZ: Platinum	Full Speed
"The Matrimony" (Wale featuring Usher)	2015	70	22	15	—	—	—	—	—	—	—	RIAA: Platinum	The Album About Nothing
"Don't Look Down" (Martin Garrix featuring Usher)	2015	— (Note: "Don't Look Down" did not enter the Billboard Hot 100, but peaked at number ten on the Bubbling Under Hot 100 Singles chart.)	—	—	63	136	16	—	62	65	9	ARIA: Gold; FIMI: Gold; BPI: Gold; MC: Gold; RMNZ: Gold	Non-album single
"Crush" (Yuna featuring Usher)	2016	—	— (Note: "Crush" did not enter the Hot R&B/Hip-Hop Songs chart, but peaked at number 24 on the Hot R&B/Hip-Hop Airplay chart.)	—	—	—	—	—	—	—	—	RIAA: Gold	Chapters
"Party" (Chris Brown featuring Usher and Gucci Mane)	2016	40	14	—	82	84	—	— (Note: "Party" did not enter the NZ Top 40 Singles Chart, but peaked at number one on the NZ Heatseekers Singles Chart.)	—	—	68	RIAA: 3× Platinum; ARIA: Platinum; BPI: Gold; MC: Gold; RMNZ: 2× Platinum	Heartbreak on a Full Moon
"Too Much" (Marshmello and Imanbek featuring Usher)	2020	—	—	—	—	—	—	— (Note: "Too Much" (Alle Farben remix) did not enter the NZ Top 40 Singles Chart, but peaked at number 31 on the NZ Hot Singles Chart.)	— (Note: "Too Much" did not enter the Swedish Singles Chart, but peaked at number 17 on the Swedish Heatseeker chart.)	—	—	BRA: Platinum	Non-album singles
"Peaches (Remix)" (Justin Bieber featuring Ludacris, Usher, and Snoop Dogg)	2021	—	—	—	—	—	—	—	—	—	—		Non-album singles
"Good Love" (City Girls featuring Usher)	2022	70	16	16	—	—	—	—	—	—	—		RAW
"Standing Next to You (Remix)" (Jungkook featuring Usher)	2023	—	—	—	—	—	—	— (Note: "Standing Next to You (Remix)" did not enter the NZ Top 40 Singles Chart, but peaked at number 13 on the NZ Hot Singles Chart.)	—	—	—		Coming Home
"Act IV: Fukin U Again (18+)" (4batz featuring Usher)	2024	—	—	—	—	—	—	—	—	—	—		Non-album singles
"SOS (Sex On Sight)" (Victoria Monét featuring Usher)	2024	—	—	—	—	—	—	—	—	—	—		Jaguar II (Deluxe)
"It Depends (The Remix)" (Chris Brown featuring Bryson Tiller and Usher)	2025	—	—	—	—	—	—	—	—	—	—		Non-album singles
"Lullaby (Mega Remix)" (JayDon and Paradise featuring Usher)	2025	—	39	—	—	—	—	—	—	—	—		Non-album singles
"Shoulda Never" (featuring Usher)	2026	76	18	11	—	—	—	—	— (Note: "Shoulda Never" did not enter the NZ Top 40 Singles Chart, but peaked at number 8 on the NZ Hot Singles Chart.)	—	—		Kehlani
"Tampa" (The-Dream featuring Usher)	2026	—	—	—	—	—	—	—	—	—	—		Love/Hate 2
"—" denotes a release that did not chart.

=== Promotional singles ===
List of singles as lead artist, with selected chart positions and certifications, showing year released and album name
Title	Year	Peak chart positions		Album
Title	Year	US	CAN	Album
"Go Missin'"	2013	—	—	Non-album promotional singles
"One" (with Michelle Chamuel)	2014	98	65	Non-album promotional singles
"Every Breath You Take" (with Josh Kaufman)	2014	— (Note: "Every Breath You Take" did not enter the Billboard Hot 100, but peaked at number six on the Bubbling Under Hot 100 Singles chart.)	98	Non-album promotional singles
"Champions" (with Rubén Blades)	2016	—	—	Hard II Love
"—" denotes a recording that did not chart in that territory.

== Other charted and certified songs ==
List of songs, with selected chart positions and certifications, showing year released and album name
Title	Year	Peak chart positions					Certifications	Album
Title	Year	US	US R&B/HH	KOR Int	NZ Hot	UK	Certifications	Album
"Feels Good" (Cam'ron featuring Usher)	1998	—	54	—	—	—		Confessions of Fire
"Bedtime" (live)	1999	—	— (Note: "Bedtime" (live) did not enter the Hot R&B/Hip-Hop Songs chart, but peaked at number two on the Bubbling Under R&B/Hip-Hop Singles chart.)	—	—	—		Live
"I Don't Know" (featuring P. Diddy)	2001	—	68	—	—	—		8701
"Confessions Part I"	2004	—	47	—	—	—	RMNZ: Gold	Confessions
"Whatever I Want"	2004	—	— (Note: "Whatever I Want" did not enter the Hot R&B/Hip-Hop Songs chart, but peaked at number nine on the Bubbling Under R&B/Hip-Hop Singles chart.)	—	—	—		Confessions
"Bad Girl"	2005	—	— (Note: "Bad Girl" did not enter the Hot R&B/Hip-Hop Songs chart, but peaked at number six on the Bubbling Under R&B/Hip-Hop Singles chart.)	—	—	—	BPI: Silver; RMNZ: Gold	Confessions
"Throwback" (featuring Jadakiss)	2005	—	36	—	—	—		Confessions
"Superstar"	2005	—	—	—	—	—	RIAA: Platinum; RMNZ: Gold	Confessions
"That's What It's Made For"	2005	—	53	—	—	—	RIAA: Gold	Confessions
"Can U Handle It?"	2005	—	—	—	—	—	RIAA: Gold	Confessions
"Seduction"	2005	—	68	—	—	—		Confessions
"Red Light"	2005	—	— (Note: "Red Light" did not enter the Hot R&B/Hip-Hop Songs chart, but peaked at number 11 on the Bubbling Under R&B/Hip-Hop Singles chart.)	—	—	—		Confessions
"Dot Com"	2005	—	53	—	—	—		Rhythm City Volume One: Caught Up
"Dat Girl Right There" (featuring Ludacris)	2007	—	74	—	—	—		Non-album song
"Best Thing" (featuring Jay-Z)	2008	—	92	—	—	—		Here I Stand
"What's a Man to Do"	2008	—	—	—	—	129		Here I Stand
"Hush"	2008	— (Note: "Hush" did not enter the Billboard Hot 100, but peaked at number 20 on the Bubbling Under Hot 100 Singles chart.)	—	—	—	—		Non-album songs
"Better on the Other Side" (with Game, Chris Brown, Diddy, DJ Khalil, Polow da Don, Mario Winans, and Boyz II Men)	2009	—	— (Note: "Better on the Other Side" did not enter the Hot R&B/Hip-Hop Songs chart, but peaked at number 13 on the Bubbling Under R&B/Hip-Hop Singles chart.)	—	—	—		Non-album songs
"My Life Your Entertainment" (T.I. featuring Usher)	2009	— (Note: "My Life Your Entertainment" did not enter the Billboard Hot 100, but peaked at number 19 on the Bubbling Under Hot 100 Singles chart.)	—	—	—	—		Paper Trail
"First Dance" (Justin Bieber featuring Usher)	2009	99	—	—	—	156		My World
"In My Bag" (featuring T.I.)	2009	—	— (Note: "In My Bag" did not enter the Hot R&B/Hip-Hop Songs chart, but peaked at number seven on the Bubbling Under R&B/Hip-Hop Singles chart.)	—	—	—		Non-album song
"Monstar"	2010	— (Note: "Monstar" did not enter the Billboard Hot 100, but peaked at number seven on the Bubbling Under Hot 100 Singles chart.)	—	—	—	—		Raymond v. Raymond
"She Don't Know"	2010	—	— (Note: "She Don't Know" did not enter the Hot R&B/Hip-Hop Songs chart, but peaked at number seven on the Bubbling Under R&B/Hip-Hop Singles chart.)	—	—	—		Raymond v. Raymond
"Looking for Love" (Diddy – Dirty Money featuring Usher)	2011	—	91	—	—	—		Last Train to Paris
"The Christmas Song (Chestnuts Roasting on an Open Fire)" (Justin Bieber featuring Usher)	2011	58	—	—	—	—	RIAA: Gold	Under the Mistletoe
"Can't Stop Won't Stop"	2012	—	—	22	—	—		Looking 4 Myself
"I Care for U"	2012	—	—	45	—	—		Looking 4 Myself
"Show Me"	2012	—	—	37	—	—		Looking 4 Myself
"Twisted" (featuring Pharrell)	2012	—	—	39	—	—		Looking 4 Myself
"What Happened to U"	2012	—	70	47	—	—		Looking 4 Myself
"Looking 4 Myself" (featuring Luke Steele)	2012	—	—	1	—	—		Looking 4 Myself
"Lessons for the Lover"	2012	—	—	54	—	—		Looking 4 Myself
"Sins of My Father"	2012	—	—	62	—	—		Looking 4 Myself
"Euphoria"	2012	—	—	60	—	—		Looking 4 Myself
"Hot Thing" (featuring ASAP Rocky)	2012	—	— (Note: "Hot Thing" did not enter the Hot R&B/Hip-Hop Songs chart, but peaked at number three on the Bubbling Under R&B/Hip-Hop Singles chart.)	—	—	—		Looking 4 Myself
"Wait for It"	2016	—	— (Note: "Wait for It" did not enter the Hot R&B/Hip-Hop Songs chart, but peaked at number 16 on the R&B Digital Song Sales chart.)	—	—	—		The Hamilton Mixtape
"Coming Home" (with Burna Boy)	2024	—	—	—	13	—		Coming Home
"A-Town Girl" (with Latto)	2024	—	—	—	32	—		Coming Home
"Risk It All" (with H.E.R.)	2024	— (Note: "Risk It All" did not enter the Billboard Hot 100, but peaked at number 25 on the Bubbling Under Hot 100 Singles chart.)	—	—	—	—		Coming Home
"—" denotes a recording that did not chart in that territory.

== See also ==
- Usher videography
