= Usher videography =

Usher performing during his OMG Tour in Houston, Texas

American singer Usher has released six video albums and appeared in forty-one music videos, eleven films, nine television programs, and four commercials. Usher released his debut single, "Call Me a Mack" in 1993 from the soundtrack Poetic Justice. Directed by Bille Woodruff, Usher appeared in the video for "You Make Me Wanna...", the lead single from his break-through album My Way (1997). The video shows Usher flanked by four dancers, to which the scene is then replaced by five clones of Usher performing dance routines around chairs. The latter song was sung by the singer on the sitcom Moesha, where he made his television debut. Usher appeared in four episodes for the show, portraying his character, Jeremy Davis. Live (1999) was released to keep Usher's fans satisfied during his four-year break between My Way and 8701 (2001). The video album version was certified gold by the Recording Industry Association of America (RIAA), denoting shipments of 50,000 units. During his musical break, he made his film debut in the 1998 science fiction horror film The Faculty, which received mixed reviews, but was a box office success. Following this, he starred in three films: She's All That (1999), Light It Up (1999) and Texas Rangers (2000).

In 2001, Usher released his third studio album 8701—four music videos for singles from the album were shot. Dave Meyers directed the video for "U Remind Me", in which Chilli of TLC makes a cameo appearance. Usher made several television appearances in 2002, including Sabrina the Teenage Witch portraying his role as The Love Doctor. The same year, he released concert video album, Usher Live Evolution 8701, which was certified platinum by the RIAA and gold by the British Phonographic Industry (BPI). In 2004, Usher released Confessions, his fourth studio album which featured the lead single "Yeah!". Directed by Little X with co-direction by Usher, the video features blue lasers, drawing inspiration from Michael Jackson's 1979 "Rock with You" video. The video for "Yeah!" received four MTV Video Music Award nominations, winning the awards for Best Male Video and Best Dance Video. The same year, Usher made a guest appearance in the music video for Beyoncé's "Naughty Girl". In 2005, Usher starred in the crime-comedy film In the Mix, portraying the role of Darrell; the film received negative reviews.

== Music videos ==
=== As performer ===
Key
†	Denotes music videos directed or co-directed by Usher

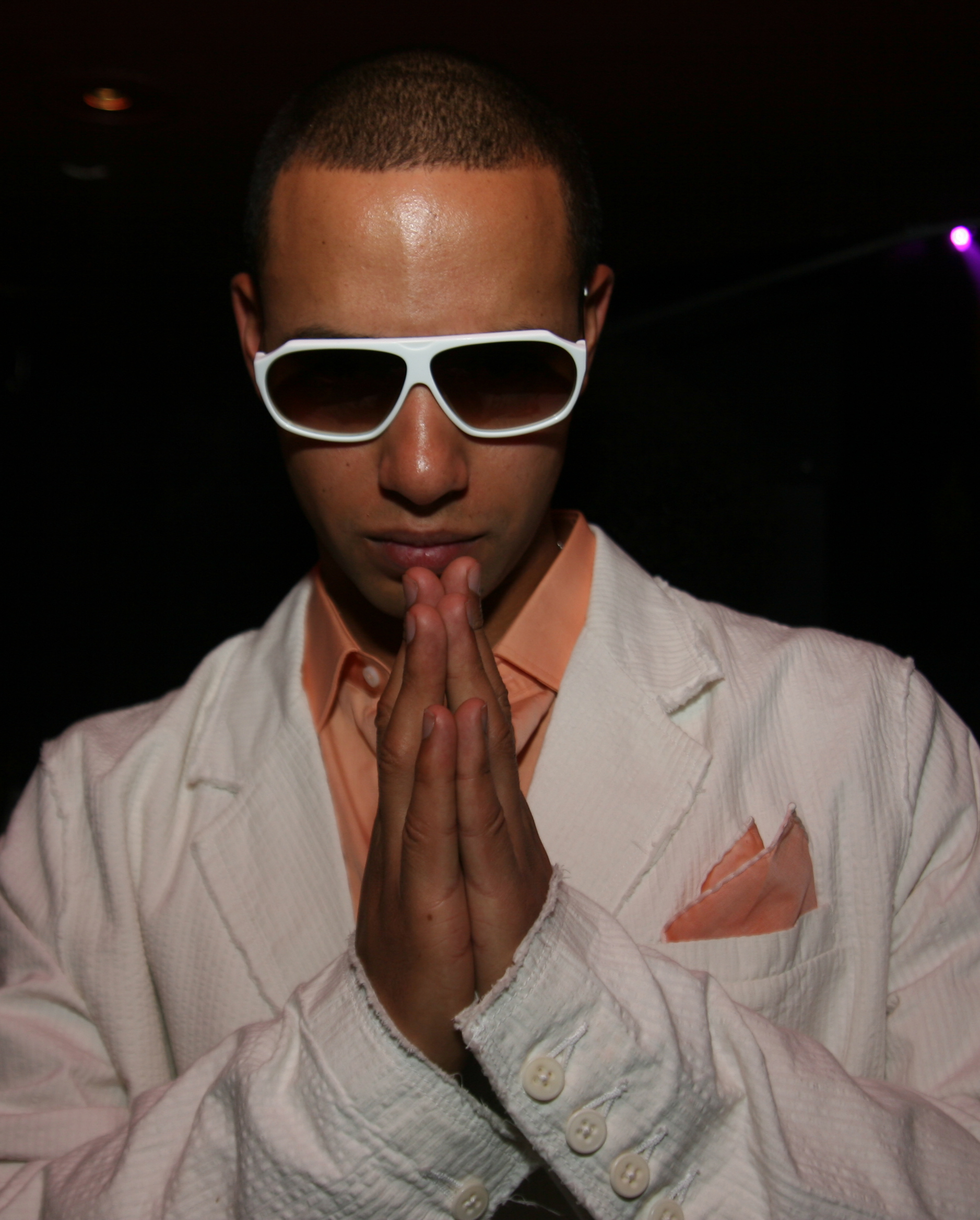
Canadian director Little X directed some of Usher's music videos, including the video for "Yeah!"

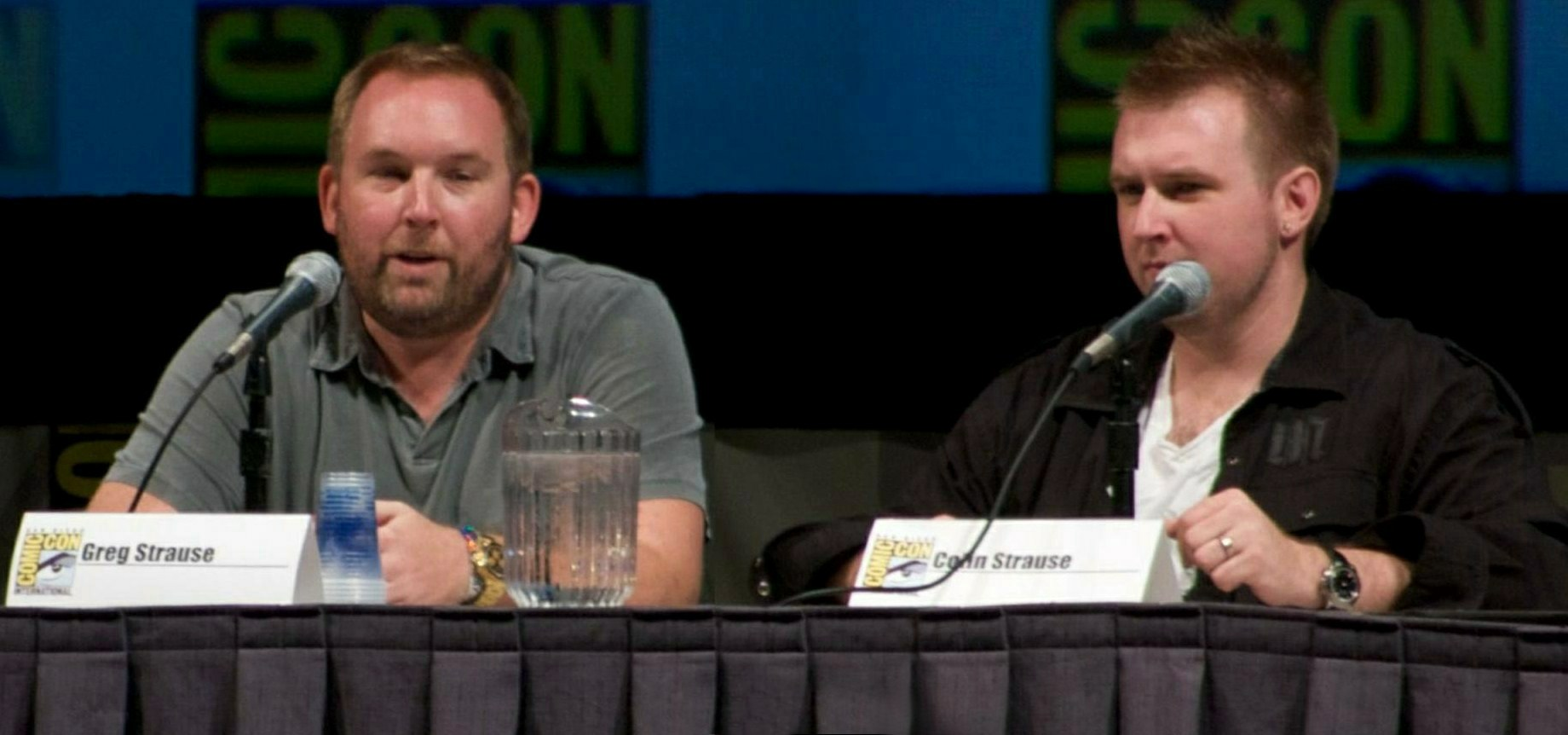
Brothers Greg and Colin Strause known as the Strause Brothers directed the videos for "Love in This Club" and "Moving Mountains"

Title	Other performer(s)	Director(s)	Album	Year	Refs
"Call Me a Mack"	None	F. Gary Gray	Poetic Justice	1993	
"Can U Get wit It"	None	Lionel C. Martin	Usher	1994	
"U Will Know"	Black Men United	Troy Smith	Jason's Lyric	1994	
"Think of You"	Craig Mack	Hype Williams	Usher	1994	
"The Many Ways"	None	Hype Williams	Usher	1995	
"Dreamin"	None	Rubin Whitmore II, Eric Haywood	Rhythm of the Games	1996	
"You Make Me Wanna..."	None	Bille Woodruff	My Way	1997	
"The Party Continues"	Jermaine Dupri, Da Brat	Paul Hunter	Life in 1472	1998	
"Nice & Slow"	None	Hype Williams	My Way	1998	
"My Way"	None	Paul Hunter	My Way	1998	
"Bedtime"	None	Antoine Fuqua	Live	1999	
"Pop Ya Collar"	None	Monty Whitebloom, Andy Delaney	8701	2001	
"U Remind Me"	None	Dave Meyers	8701	2001	
"U Got It Bad"	None	Little X	8701	2002	
"I Need a Girl (Part One)"	P. Diddy, Loon	Benny Boom	We Invented the Remix	2002	
"U Don't Have to Call"	None	Little X	8701	2002	
"U-Turn"	None	Little X	8701	2002	
"What More Can I Give"	Michael Jackson and The All Stars	Marc Schaffel	—N/a	2003	
"Yeah!" †	Lil Jon, Ludacris	Little X, Usher	Confessions	2004	
"Burn"	None	Jake Nava	Confessions	2004	
"Confessions Part II" †	None	Chris Robinson, Usher	Confessions	2004	
"My Boo"	Alicia Keys	Chris Robinson, Usher	Confessions	2005	
"Caught Up"	None	Little X	Confessions	2005	
"Same Girl"	R. Kelly	Little X	Double Up	2007	
"Love in This Club"	Young Jeezy	Brothers Strause	Here I Stand	2008	
"Moving Mountains"	None	Brothers Strause	Here I Stand	2008	
"Trading Places"	None	Chris Robinson	Here I Stand	2008	
"Hush"	None	Mil Cannon	Change is Now: Renewing America's Promise	2008	
"Spotlight"	Gucci Mane	Benny Boom	The State vs. Radric Davis	2009	
"Fed Up"	DJ Khaled, Drake, Young Jeezy, Rick Ross	Gil Green	Victory	2009	
"Better on the Other Side"	The Game, Chris Brown, Diddy, DJ Khalil, Polow da Don, Mario Winans, Boyz II Men	Taydoe	—N/a	2009	
"Hey Daddy (Daddy's Home)"	Plies	Chris Robinson	Raymond v. Raymond	2010	
"We Are the World 25 for Haiti"	Artists for Haiti	Paul Haggis	—N/a	2010	
"Lil Freak"	Nicki Minaj	Taj Stansberry	Raymond v. Raymond	2010	
"OMG"	will.i.am	Anthony Mandler	Raymond v. Raymond	2010	
"Somebody to Love (Remix)"	Justin Bieber	Dave Meyers	Versus	2010	
"There Goes My Baby"	None	Anthony Mandler	Raymond v. Raymond	2010	
"DJ Got Us Fallin' in Love"	Pitbull	Hiro Murai	Versus	2010	
"More"	None	Damien Sung	Raymond v. Raymond	2011	
"Looking for Love"	Diddy – Dirty Money	Colin Tilley	Last Train to Paris	2011	
"Dirty Dancer"	Enrique Iglesias, Lil Wayne	Yasha Malekzad, Jeff Dotson, Ethan Lader	Versus	2011	
"Promise"	Romeo Santos	Anthony Mandler	Versus	2011	
"Without You"	David Guetta	Christopher Hewitt	Nothing but the Beat	2011	
"Climax"	None	Sam Pilling	Looking 4 Myself	2012	
"Scream"	None	BB Gun	Looking 4 Myself	2012	
"Lemme See"	Rick Ross	Philip Andelman	Looking 4 Myself	2012	
"Touch'N You"	Rick Ross	Chris Robinson	God Forgives, I Don't	2012	
"Dive"	None	Chris Applebaum	Looking 4 Myself	2012	
"Numb"	None	Chris Applebaum, Grace Harry	Looking 4 Myself	2012	
"Rest of My Life"	Ludacris, David Guetta	Christopher Sims	Ludaversal	2012	
"Good Kisser"	None	Christopher Sims	Hard II Love	2013	
"New Flame"	Chris Brown, Rick Ross	Chris Brown	X	2014	
"She Came to Give It to You"	Nicki Minaj	Phili Andelman	Hard II Love	2014	
"Body Language"	Kid Ink, Tinashe	Darren Craig	Full Speed	2014	
"The Matrimony"	Wale	Sarah McColgan	The Album About Nothing	2015	
"Don't Look Down"	Martin Garrix	Rory Kramer	—N/a	2015	
"Chains"	Nas, Bibi Bourelly	Ben Louis Nicholas, Daniel Arsham	—N/a	2015	
"Crush"	Yuna	Daniel Carberry	Chapters	2016	
"No Limit"	Young Thug	Joey Toman	Hard II Love	2016	
"Crash"	None	Christopher Sims	Hard II Love	2016	
"Champions"	Rubén Blades	Jonathan Jakubowicz	Hard II Love	2016	
"Rivals"	Future	The RiTE Brothers	Hard II Love	2016	
"Party"	Chris Brown, Gucci Mane	Chris Brown	Heartbreak on a Full Moon	2016	
"Peace Sign"	Zaytoven	Yoni Lappin	A	2018	
"Come Thru"	Summer Walker	Lacey Duke	Over It	2020	
"Don't Waste My Time"	Ella Mai	LeSean Harris	—N/a	2020	
"California"	Tyga	Unknown	—N/a	2020	
"I Cry"	None	Usher	—N/a	2020	
"Bad Habits"	None	Chris Robinson	—N/a	2020	
"Too Much"	Marshmello, Imanbek	Christian Breslauer	—N/a	2020	
"This Day"	Kiana Ledé	Unknown	Jingle Jangle: A Christmas Journey	2020	
"Good Love"	City Girls	Daps	RAW	2022	
"Glu"	None	Usher	—N/a	2023	
"Boyfriend"	Keke Palmer	Ricky Alvarez	—N/a	2023	
"Good Good"	Summer Walker, 21 Savage	Warren Fu	Coming Home	2023	
"Dientes"	J Balvin, DJ Khaled	Patricia Alfonso, Chris Cabrera	—N/a	2023	
"Transparency"	2 Chainz, Lil Wayne	Unknown	Welcome 2 Collegrove	2023	
"Standing Next to You (Remix)"	Jungkook	Yong-seok Choi	Coming Home	2023	
"Risk It All"	H.E.R.	Dave Meyers	Coming Home	2023	
"Ruin"	Pheelz	Dave Meyers	Coming Home	2024	

=== Cameo appearances ===
Title	Performer(s)	Director(s)	Album	Year	Refs
"Rubber Band Man"	T.I.	Darren Grant	Trap Muzik	2004	
"Naughty Girl"	Beyoncé	Jake Nava	Dangerously in Love	2004	
"Nasty Girl"	The Notorious B.I.G., Diddy, Nelly, Jagged Edge, Avery Storm	Sanaa Hamri	Duets: The Final Chapter	2005	
"One Time"	Justin Bieber	Vashtie Kola	My World	2009	
"Loyal"	Chris Brown, Lil Wayne, Tyga	Chris Brown	X	2014	
"Where's the Love?"	The Black Eyed Peas	Michael Jurkovac	—N/a	2016	
"Fallin'"	Chris Brown, Leon Thomas	Chris Brown	Brown	2026	

== Video albums ==
Title	Album details	Certifications
Live	Concert; Released: March 23, 1999; Formats: VHS	RIAA: Gold; MC: Gold
Evolution 8701 Live in Concert	Concert; Released: August 30, 2002; Formats: DVD	RIAA: Platinum; ARIA: Gold; BPI: Gold
U Don't Have To Call/U Got It Bad	Video single; Released: 2002; Formats: DVD	RIAA: Gold
Truth Tour Behind the Truth: Live from Atlanta	Concert + documentary; Released: September 16, 2005; Formats: 3xDVD	RIAA: 7× Platinum
Rhythm City Volume One: Caught Up	Short film; Released: 2005; Formats: DVD, UMD	ARIA: Gold; MC: Gold
Usher OMG Tour Live From London	Concert; Released: October 31, 2011; Formats: DVD, Blu-ray	

== Filmography ==
Key
†	Denotes films that have not yet been released

Title	Year	Role	Director(s)	Budget	Box office	Refs
Title	Year	Role	Director(s)	USD$		Refs
The Faculty	1998	Gabe Santora	Robert Rodriguez	15,000,000	40,283,321	
She's All That	1999	D.J. Campus	Robert Iscove	10,000,000	63,366,989	
Light It Up	1999	Lester Dewitt	Craig Bolotin	13,000,000	5,985,690	
Geppetto	2000	Ring Leader	Tom Moore	Unknown	—N/a	
Texas Rangers	2001	Randolph Douglas Scipio	Steve Miner	38,000,000	623,374	
In the Mix	2005	Darrell Williams	Ron Underwood	Unknown	10,223,896	
Killers	2010	Kevin The Manager	Robert Luketic	75,000,000	98,159,963	
Justin Bieber: Never Say Never	2011	Himself	Jon M. Chu	13,000,000	99,036,827	
Scary Movie 5	2013	Ira (The Janitor)	Malcolm D. Lee	20,000,000	78,148,326	
Justin Bieber's Believe	2013	Himself	Jon M. Chu	5,000,000	6,206,566	
Muppets Most Wanted	2014	Wedding Usher (Cameo)	James Bobin	50,000,000	80,400,000	
Popstar: Never Stop Never Stopping	2016	Himself	Akiva Schaffer, Jorma Taccone	20,000,000		
Hands of Stone	2016	Sugar Ray Leonard	Jonathan Jakubowicz	20,000,000	5,000,000	
Burden	2018	Clarence Brooks	Andrew Heckler			
Incredibles 2	2018	Valet (voice cameo)	Brad Bird	200,000,000	328,000,000	
Hustlers	2019	Himself	Lorene Scafaria	20,700,000	157,600,000	
Bad Hair	2020	Germane D.	Justin Simien			

== Television ==
Title	Year	Role	Producer/Creator	Episode(s)	Ref
Moesha	1997	Jeremy Davis	Erma Elzy-Jones	"Keepin' It Real"	
Moesha	1997	Jeremy Davis	Henry Chan	"Double Date"	
Moesha	1998	Jeremy Davis	Henry Chan	"Pajama Jam"	
The Bold and the Beautiful	1998	Raymond	Unknown	N/A	
Moesha	1999	Jeremy Davis	Sara Finney, Vida Spears	"Independence Day"	
Promised Land	1999	Winston	Lawrence Jay Lipton	"Baby Steps"	
The Famous Jett Jackson	2000	Zander "Z-Ride" Hall	Unknown	"Step Up"	
Sabrina the Teenage Witch	2002	The Love Doctor	Paula Hart, Bruce Ferber	"I Think I Love You"	
The Twilight Zone	2002	Eric Boggs	Unknown	"To Protect and Serve"	
American Dreams	2002	Marvin Gaye	Unknown	"Cold Snap"	
7th Heaven	2002	Will	Brenda Hampton, E. Duke Vincent, Aaron Spelling	"A Cry for Help"	
Soul Food	2003	Cameron Marks	Felicia D. Henderson, Tracey E. Edmonds, George Tillman, Jr., Robert Teitel, Robert Teitel, Babyface	"Attracting Opposites"	
The Voice	2013-2014	Himself/Coach	Alan Carter		
The Voice	2015, 2019	Himself/Mentor	Alan Carter		
Ellen's Game of Games	2020	Himself/Guest		"Sweet Foam Alabama"	
Songland	2020	Himself	Unknown	"Usher"	
Dave (TV series)	2023	Himself	Dave Burd	"Hearsay"	

== Documentaries ==
Year	Title
2004	Fade to Black
2011	Justin Bieber: Never Say Never
2012	Bad 25
2012	Singin' in the Rain: Raining on a New Generation
2013	Justin Bieber's Believe
2014	ATL: The Untold Story of Atlanta's Rise in the Rap Game
2017	Through the Fire: The Legacy of Barack Obama
2017	Can't Stop, Won't Stop: A Bad Boy Story
2017	Welcome to My Life
2017	What We Started
2017	Louder Together
2018	Guilty Until Proven Guilty
2020	David Blaine: The Magic Way
2021	Justin Bieber: The New Me
2023	Thriller 40
2025	Usher: Rendezvous in Paris

== Commercials ==
Product/Brand	Year	Director	Ref
Twix	2001	Unknown	
One Night One Star - Usher Live on Showtime	2005	Moses Edinberg	
Usher VIP	2009	Pierre Morel	
NBA All-Star	2010	Unknown	
Dance Central 3	2012	Unknown	
Mercedes-Benz CLA-Class	2013	Unknown	
Samsung	2013	Rich Lee	
Cheerios	2014	Unknown	
MasterCard	2015	Unknown	
Pepsi	2015	Unknown	
