= Missin U =

Single by Usher

from the album Hard II Love
- Released: August 26, 2016
- Length: 4:10
- Label: RCA
- Songwriter(s): Usher Raymond IV; Andrew "Pop" Wansel; Autoro Whitfield; Faheem Mardre; Robert Calloway; Warren "Oak" Felder; Walter Becker; Donald Fagen
- Producer(s): Pop & Oak

Usher singles chronology
"Crash" (2016)	"Missin U" (2016)	"Rivals" (2016)

"Missin U" is a song by American singer Usher. It was released by RCA Records on August 26, 2016 on for online streaming and for digital download. The record is taken from his eighth studio album, Hard II Love. The song was written by Usher, Robert Calloway, Walter Becker, Donald Fagen, Autoro Whitfield, Faheem Mardre, Andrew Wansel, and Warren Felder, while production was handled by the latter two. The song features a sample of Steely Dan's song "Third World Man" from their 1980 album Gaucho. The song impacted urban contemporary radio as the album's third single on September 13, 2016

== Background and release ==
Following Usher's 2012 album Looking 4 Myself, his next studio album was expected to be released in 2014. "Good Kisser", "She Came to Give It to You" and "I Don't Mind" were released and he also embarked on the UR Experience Tour, yet no album was released. In October 2015, Usher released "Chains", a song about social justice featuring the artists Nas and Bibi Bourelly. The singer released "Crash" on June 10, 2016 available for digital download on iTunes, Amazon, Google Play and online streaming services, Tidal, Apple Music, Spotify, and YouTube. Travis Scott released a remix to the song.

== Credits and personnel ==
Credits adapted from Tidal.

- Usher — lead vocals, composer, lyricist
- Manny Marroquin — mixing engineer
- Warren "Oak" Felder — composer, lyricist
- Andrew "Pop" Wansel — composer, lyricist

== Charts ==
=== Weekly charts ===
Chart (2016)	Peak position
US R&B/Hip-Hop Airplay (Billboard)	39
