= No Limit (Usher song) =

- Standard artwork

Single by Usher featuring Young Thug

from the album Hard II Love
- Released: June 9, 2016
- Recorded: 2015
- Length: 3:48
- Label: RCA
- Songwriters: Usher Raymond IV; Brandon Hodge; Christopher "Talent" Perry; Theron Thomas; Timothy Thomas; Keith Thomas; Jeffrey Lamar Williams; Kgaugelo Nalane
- Producers: B.A.M.; Perry; Rock City; WondaGurl (remix)

Usher singles chronology
"Crush" (2016)	"No Limit" (2016)	"Crash" (2016)

Young Thug singles chronology
"Pick Up the Phone" (2016)	"No Limit" (2016)	"Guwop Home" (2016)

Music video
- "No Limit" on YouTube

"No Limit" is a song by American singer Usher featuring fellow American singer and rapper Young Thug. It was written by the artists alongside producers Rock City, Brandon "B.A.M." Hodge, and Christopher "Talent" Perry. The track gives reference to Master P's song, "Make 'Em Say Uhh", from his 1997 No Limit Records release Ghetto D, with the lyrics "Make you say uh, no limit / Got that Master P, no limit baby".

It was released by RCA on June 9, 2016, for online streaming through the streaming service Tidal, which Usher co-owns. The following day it was released for paid purchase on digital download and other online streaming services. "No Limit" serves as the lead single off his eighth studio album, Hard II Love. In the US, the song reached number 32 on the US Billboard Hot 100 chart, number nine on the Hot R&B/Hip-Hop Songs chart.

== Background and release ==
It had been 4 years since Usher's 2012 album Looking 4 Myself. He has been teasing his eight studio album that was expected to be released in 2014. “Good Kisser”, “She Came To Give It To You” and "I Don't Mind" were released as well as the world tour UR Experience, yet no album was released. In October 2015, Raymond released "Chains", a song about social justice featuring the artist Nas and Bibi Bourelly. Travis Scott released a remix to the song.

== Critical reception ==
Paper Magazine said "Usher's back at it again with "No Limit," a sultry summer jam". Brian Joseph of Spin describes Usher as an "exceptional of a singer as ever on the luscious beat". Madeline Roth of MTV writes Raymond in "No Limit" channeling Drake's sing-rapping and Ty Dolla $ign's syrupy sweetness.

== Commercial performance ==
In North America, the song reached number 32 on the US Billboard Hot 100 chart, number one on the Hot R&B/Hip-Hop Airplay and Mainstream R&B/Hip-Hop charts. As of February 2024, "No Limit" has sold 2 million copies in the United States.

== Music video ==
The music video for "No Limit" was directed by Joey Toman. The video for "No Limit" was uploaded August 5, 2016 exclusively online through the streaming service Tidal, which Usher co-owns. On August 8, 2016 it was released on YouTube and Vevo. It features cameo appearances from Ty Dolla Sign, Boosie, Gucci Mane and internet dancing sensations Kida Burns, Ayo & Teo, Meechie, Yvng Quan, Lil Deedee, kidatz and Mr Hot Spot. In the video, Usher dances in front of an all white background accompanied with his dancers. His choreography was likened to his performance at the 2016 BET Awards. As of August 2024, the music video has over 249 million views on YouTube.

== Remix ==
The official remix, "No Limit" (G-Mix)" featured New Orleans rapper Master P, Travis Scott, A$AP Ferg, and fellow Atlanta natives 2 Chainz, and Gucci Mane. The song was released on SoundCloud in August 19, 2016, and features reworked production by WondaGurl.

== Live performances ==
Usher performed the song live for the first time as a part of his headlining set at the BET Experience with other hits including "Yeah!", "U Don't Have to Call", "Love in This Club", "OMG" and many more. Rolling Out declared Usher a leading voice of the past and present R&B generation due to his over 20-year career in music. Mikael Wood of Los Angeles Times described his performance as nothing short of a spectacle.

Usher also did the first live televised performance of the song at 2016 BET Awards which took place at the Microsoft Theater in Los Angeles, California on June 26, 2016. He was dressed in a green windbreaker jacket with the words "Don't Trump America" on the back, two gold chains, black skinny jeans and Air Jordan sneakers. Usher and his backup dancers performed heavily choreographed routines to the song backed with flashing lights and special pyro technics. Usher's performance received positive reviews and was considered by USA Today, Perez Hilton, MTV News, BET.com, New York Daily News and Hollywood Life and many other sources as one of the highlights of the night. Maura Johnston of Rolling Stone described Usher as "the secret weapon of award shows" and declared him as "Award Show King". On September 24, 2016 Usher performed the song live at the iHeartRadio Music Festival 2016 as a part of his set list which he headlined. Usher also performed the song on September 20, 2016, On Jimmy Kimmel Live. He also performed the song at "105.1 Powerhouse 2016" with many other hits which took place at the Barclays Center in Brooklyn, NY and also at "Hot 97 Hot For The Holidays Concert" which took place at Prudential Center in Newark, NJ. Which he served as the headliner of both events.

== Cover art ==
On January 13, 2016, Usher has announced then title of his eighth album, Flawed, on friend and artist Daniel Arsham Instagram post. In the video "Usher and Arsham said they’re working on some “Amazing, Incredible, Awesome stuff” for the new album. The single cover art is a sculpture of Usher that was done by Arsham, which he had to stand still for 4 hours for him to complete.

== Credits and personnel ==
Credits adapted from Tidal.

- Brandon "B.A.M" Hodge— composer, producer
- Jaycen Joshua — mixing engineert
- Christopher Perry — composer, producer
- Usher Raymond — Lead vocals, composer, lyricist
- Keith Thomas – composer, lyricist
- Theron Thomas — composer, lyricist
- Timothy Thomas – composer, lyricist
- Jeffery Lamar Williams — Lead vocals, composer, lyricist, performer

== Charts ==
=== Weekly charts ===
Weekly chart performance for "No Limit"
Chart (2016)	Peak position
Belgium Urban (Ultratop Flanders)	45
US Billboard Hot 100	32
US Hot R&B/Hip-Hop Songs (Billboard)	9
US R&B/Hip-Hop Airplay (Billboard)	1
US Rhythmic Airplay (Billboard)	4

=== Year-end charts ===
Year-end chart performance for "No Limit"
Chart (2016)	Position
US Billboard Hot 100	90
US Hot R&B/Hip-Hop Songs (Billboard)	34
US R&B/Hip-Hop Airplay (Billboard)	19
US Rhythmic (Billboard)	26

== Certifications ==
Certifications and sales for "No Limit"
Region	Certification	Certified units/sales
Australia (ARIA)	Gold	35,000^{‡}
Canada (Music Canada)	Gold	40,000^{‡}
New Zealand (RMNZ)	Gold	15,000^{‡}
United States (RIAA)	2× Platinum	2,000,000^{‡}
^{‡} Sales+streaming figures based on certification alone.
