= UR Experience Tour =

2014–15 concert tour by Usher

UR Experience
- Tour by Usher
- Promotional poster for the tour
- Start date: November 1, 2014
- End date: March 26, 2015
- Legs: 2
- No. of shows: 45

Usher concert chronology
- OMG Tour (2010–11); UR Experience (2014–15); Usher: Past Present Future (2024–25)

The UR Experience was the fifth concert tour by American artist Usher. Visiting North America and Europe, the tour played over 40 concerts in 2014 and 2015.

== Background ==
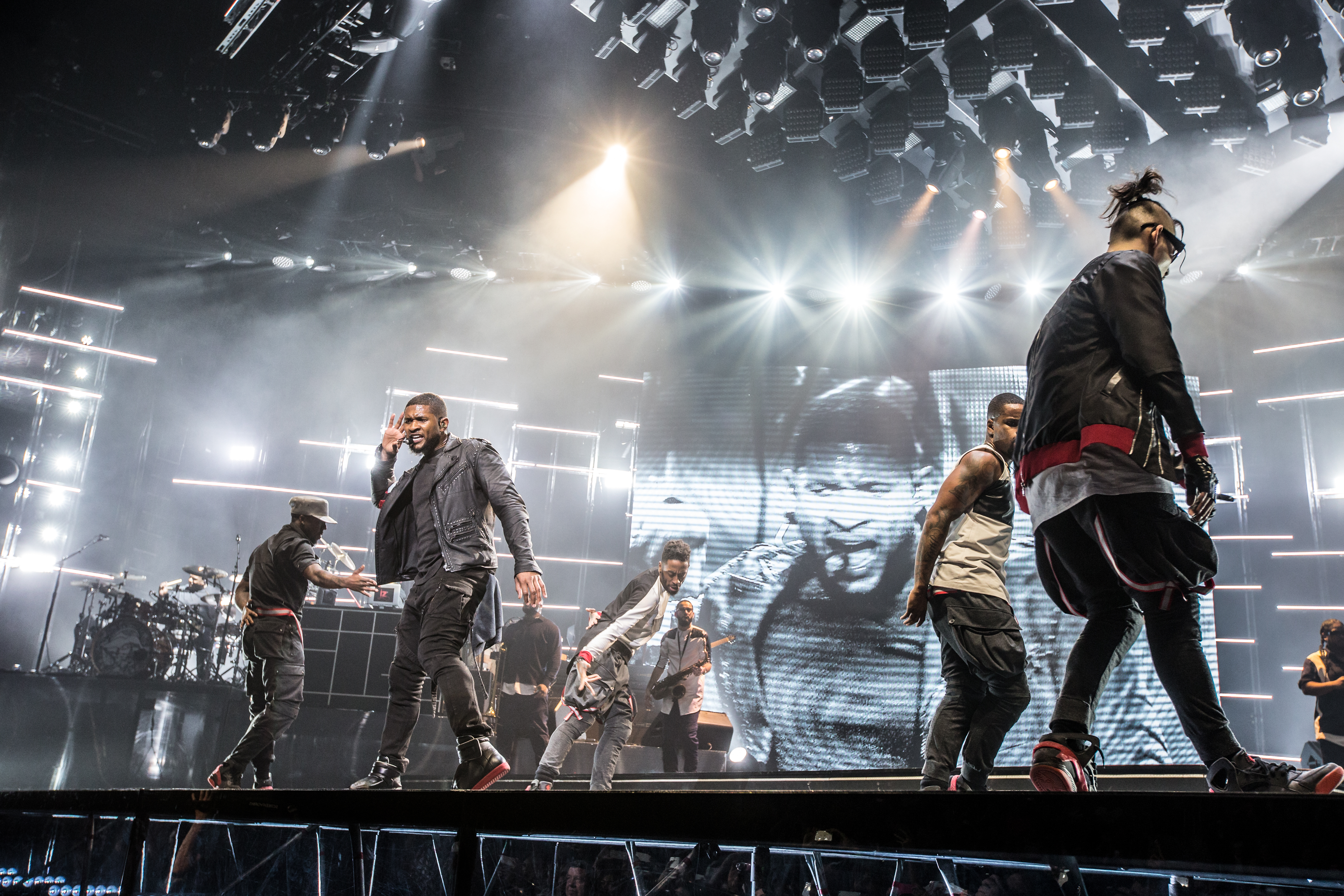
Usher performing in San Jose

The tour was announced on September 2, 2014.

"With 'The UR Experience', I want to give my fans an ever-changing live show full of surprises and special guests", says Usher. "I am really excited to be with my fans and give them an Usher experience like they've never seen or heard before."

To promote the tour, Raymond released a 30-second black and white video of him training, dancing and preparing for the upcoming tour.

Prior to the tour Usher began working with fashion designer Kerby Jean-Raymond For the tour, they created a custom Pyer Moss bike jacket that he wore over a mess shirt with black cargo pants. Completing the outfit he wore Martin Margiela chain embellished red suede sneakers.

The November 30, 2014 concert, held at Rexall Place in Edmonton, Alberta, Canada; was livestreamed via Yahoo Live!.

== Critical reception ==
The tour was met with positive reviews.

Jon Paroles from The New York Times wrote: "He has established himself as one of R&B's supreme performers and craftsmen, following through on what he learned from Michael Jackson in particular."

Ashley Lee of The Hollywood Reporter wrote: "His routines were sharp, effortless and even playful at times, and he didn't need to rely on constant gyrating to entertain. Usher also shined vocally when he took the time to do so: bouncing his gold mic stand during 'Caught Up', hitting the top of his range on 'Climax', adding extra runs to 'U Remind Me', impressively closing 'Burn' a cappella."

Robbyn Mitchell of the Tampa Bay Times wrote: "Usher reminded fans constantly that they've been supporting him for 20 years in the music industry -- an unfathomable stat whenever he paused to smile his charming schoolboy girl".

A.R. Shaw from Rolling Out commented: "With new age R&B acts such Chris Brown and Justin Bieber building their presence in music, some may forget Usher's overall impact on the genre. But the 'UR Experience Tour' proves, again, that Usher's legendary status remains intact.".

Gerrick D. Kennedy of the Los Angeles Times wrote: "An Usher show has long been an exhilarating affair packed with high-octane choreography held together by sleek, masterful showmanship."

François Marchand of The Vancouver Sun states, "Usher can embody the cybernetic physicality of a MJ and the pure funk swagger of a JB (as on party jam Twisted — 'Hit me one more time!'), and you can applaud an artist who doesn't rely so much on tape playback and shows just how much blood and sweat he leaves out there on the stage."

David Smyth from the London Evening Standard gave the performance in London 4 out of 5 stars. He said: "Usher himself was quite the mover and shaker, invoking his idol Michael Jackson as he slid and shimmied about the stage in gold trainers. During one triumphant spell, including 'Twisted' and 'Caught Up', his band became an old-style soul revue, horns blasting while the lights blazed. There were snippets of Stevie Wonder and, more surprisingly, Eric Clapton."

== Opening acts ==
- DJ Cassidy (North America)
- August Alsina (North America)
- Nico & Vinz (Europe)

== Setlist ==
The following setlist was obtained from the concert held on November 1, 2014; at the Bell Centre in Montreal, Quebec, Canada. It does not present all concerts for the duration of the tour.

1. "My Way"
2. "OMG"
3. "Love in This Club"
4. "You Make Me Wanna..."
5. "Video Sequence" (contains elements of "Lil Freak")
6. "Nice & Slow"
7. "U Remind Me"
8. "Twisted"
9. "Caught Up"
10. "She Came to Give it to You"
11. "Video Sequence" (contains elements of "Dot Com")
12. "Climax"
13. "Seduction"
14. "That's What It's Made For"
15. "Confessions Part I" / "Confessions Part II"
16. "Instrumental Sequence"
17. "Burn"
18. "There Goes My Baby"
19. "U Got It Bad"
20. "Superstar"
21. "Video Sequence"
22. "Bad Girl"
23. "Good Kisser"
24. "U Don't Have to Call"
25. "DJ Got Us Fallin' in Love"
26. "Yeah!"
27. "Video Sequence"
28. "Without You"

== Tour dates ==
Date	City	Country	Venue
North America
November 1, 2014	Montreal	Canada	Bell Centre
November 2, 2014	Toronto	Canada	Air Canada Centre
November 4, 2014	Auburn Hills	United States	The Palace of Auburn Hills
November 5, 2014	Cleveland	United States	Quicken Loans Arena
November 7, 2014	New York City	United States	Madison Square Garden
November 10, 2014	Washington, D.C.	United States	Verizon Center
November 11, 2014	Philadelphia	United States	Wells Fargo Center
November 13, 2014	Boston	United States	TD Garden
November 14, 2014	Uncasville	United States	Mohegan Sun Arena
November 15, 2014	Atlantic City	United States	Boardwalk Hall
November 17, 2014	Chicago	United States	United Center
November 18, 2014	Saint Paul	United States	Xcel Energy Center
November 21, 2014	Los Angeles	United States	Staples Center
November 22, 2014	Las Vegas	United States	MGM Grand Garden Arena
November 24, 2014	San Jose	United States	SAP Center
November 26, 2014	Seattle	United States	KeyArena
November 27, 2014	Vancouver	Canada	Rogers Arena
November 30, 2014	Edmonton	Canada	Rexall Place
December 2, 2014	Broomfield	United States	1stBank Center
December 4, 2014	Dallas	United States	American Airlines Center
December 5, 2014	Houston	United States	Toyota Center
December 6, 2014	New Orleans	United States	Smoothie King Center
December 8, 2014	Memphis	United States	FedExForum
December 9, 2014	Atlanta	United States	Philips Arena
December 12, 2014	Orlando	United States	Amway Center
December 13, 2014	Miami	United States	American Airlines Arena
December 14, 2014	Tampa	United States	Amalie Arena
Europe
February 27, 2015	Copenhagen	Denmark	Forum Copenhagen
February 28, 2015	Hamburg	Germany	O_{2} World Hamburg
March 2, 2015	Cologne	Germany	Lanxess Arena
March 3, 2015	Antwerp	Belgium	Sportpaleis
March 4, 2015	Amsterdam	Netherlands	Ziggo Dome
March 6, 2015	Zürich	Switzerland	Hallenstadion
March 9, 2015	Munich	Germany	Olympiahalle
~~March 10, 2015~~	~~Vienna~~	~~Austria~~	~~Wiener Stadthalle~~
March 11, 2015	Paris	France	Zénith Paris
March 12, 2015	Mannheim	Germany	SAP Arena
March 14, 2015	Nottingham	England	Capital FM Arena
March 15, 2015	Sheffield	England	Sheffield Arena
March 17, 2015	Glasgow	England	SSE Hydro
March 18, 2015	Newcastle	England	Metro Radio Arena
March 20, 2015	Dublin	Ireland	3Arena
March 21, 2015	Belfast	Ireland	Odyssey Arena
March 23, 2015	Manchester	England	Manchester Arena
March 24, 2015	Birmingham	England	Barclaycard Arena
March 26, 2015	London	England	The O_{2} Arena

=== Box office score data ===
Venue	City	Tickets sold / available	Gross revenue
Mohegan Sun Arena	Uncasville	6,238 / 7,103 (88%)	$636,570
Staples Center	Los Angeles	12,544 / 12,544 (100%)	$1,205,705
Toyota Center	Houston	9,442 / 9,706 (97%)	$804,210
Philips Arena	Atlanta	11,765 / 11,765 (100%)	$880,618
Amway Center	Orlando	6,444 / 10,994 (59%)	$534,349
Amalie Arena	Tampa	5,186 / 8,800 (59%)	$440,679
O_{2} World Hamburg	Hamburg	11,386 / 13,473 (84%)	$688,534
Sportpaleis	Antwerp	9,409 / 15,031 (63%)	$427,727
Hallenstadion	Zürich	9,224 / 13,000 (71%)	$718,805
SSE Hydro	Glasgow	3,830 / 4,094 (93%)	$281,965
Manchester Arena	Manchester	8,493 / 10,000 (85%)	$627,173
The O_{2} Arena	London	15,477 / 16,062 (96%)	$1,327,540
TOTAL		109,438 / 132,572 (82%)	$8,573,875

== Personnel ==
- Lead Artist
- Lead Vocals/Guitar/Drums/Percussion: Usher Raymond
- The Funk Rock Orchestra
- Guitar/Keyboards/MD: Natural
- Drums/Percussion: Aaron Spears
- Percussion/DJ/MPC/Sampling/String Programmer/Hype Man: Iz Avila
- Keyboards/Organ/Synthesizer/MD: Buddy Strong
- Keyboards/Keybass/Keytar/MD: Valdez Brantley
- Additional Musicians
- Bass Guitar/Playback Engineer: Andre "Dre" Bowman (on certain dates)
- Horns: Rashawn (Trumpet), Rob (Sax), Sean (Trumpet), and Kevin (Trombone)
- Vocalists
- Backing vocalists: Kristal Lyndriette, Gene Noble and Neka Brown
- Dancers
- Choreographer: Jamaica Craft
- Dancers: QuitaBee, Eyal Pipo Layani, Kento Mori, Josh Smith, Jessica Digi (Europe only), Yusuke Nakai, Marc Marvelous, Ashley Everett, Antonio Hudnell and Naeemah McCowan
