= Fast & Furious 6 (soundtrack) =

Fast & Furious 6 (Original Motion Picture Soundtrack)

Soundtrack album by Various artists
- Released: May 17, 2013 (iTunes); May 21, 2013 (CD)
- Genres: Latin; Hip-hop; EDM; house
- Length: 50:18
- Label: Def Jam

Singles from Fast & Furious 6 (Original Motion Picture Soundtrack)
- 1. "We Own It" Released: June 12, 2013

Fast & Furious 6 (Original Motion Picture Soundtrack) is the soundtrack to Fast & Furious 6, released digitally to iTunes on May 17, 2013, and on CD on May 21, 2013 by Def Jam Recordings. It mainly features electronic and hip hop tracks.

Lucas Vidal composed the musical score for Fast & Furious 6 since Brian Tyler had other commitments with Iron Man 3 and Thor: The Dark World.

The track "We Own It" by 2 Chainz and Wiz Khalifa reached number six on the UK Singles Chart, becoming 2 Chainz's most successful single in that country.

With the agreement of the record label Axtone (owned by Swedish DJ Axwell from Swedish House Mafia), the tracks "Here We Go" (featuring Swanky Tunes) and "Quasar" by Hard Rock Sofa, a Russian band of DJs, were used in the film.

The Glitch Mob remix of The Prodigy's song Breathe was used in trailers leading up to the release of the film.

== Track listing ==
No.	Title	Writer(s)	Producer(s)	Length
1.	"We Own It (Fast & Furious)" (performed by 2 Chainz and Wiz Khalifa)	Tauheed Epps; Cameron Jibril Thomaz; Alex Schwartz; Joe Khajadourian; Breyan Stanley Isaac	The Futuristics	3:47
2.	"Ball" (performed by T.I. featuring Lil Wayne)	Dwayne Carter; Eric Goudy II; Clifford Harris; Earl Hood; Rico Love; Orville Hall; Phillip Price		3:24
3.	"Con Locura" (performed by Sua featuring Jiggy Drama)	Sohanny Sua; Humby; Jiggy Drama	Humby; Brian Alvarez (voc.)	3:47
4.	"HK Superstar" (performed by MC Jin featuring Daniel Wu)	Jin Au-Yeung; Jae Choung; Kevin Nishimura; James Roh; Stefon Taylor	Bionik	3:24
5.	"Failbait" (performed by deadmau5 featuring Cypress Hill)	Joel Zimmerman; Senen Reyes; Louis Freese	deadmau5	4:49
6.	"Bada Bing" (performed by Benny Banks)	Benjamin Hannington; Ellis Taylor	Show N Prove	3:19
7.	"Burst!" (Bart B More Remix) (performed by Peaches)	Peaches; Alex Epton; Alex Ridha	Boys Noize; XXXChange	6:13
8.	"Mister Chicken" (performed by Deluxe)	Vianney Elineau; Clement Barba; Pierre Coll; Sacha Bertocchi; Elisa Poublan; Simon Caillat	Chinese Man Records	3:13
9.	"Roll It Up" (performed by The Crystal Method)	Ken Jordan; Scott Kirkland		6:01
10.	"Here We Go / Quasar" (Hybrid Remix) (performed by Hard Rock Sofa and Swanky Tunes)	Charlotte Anne Truman; Mike Truman; Christopher James Healings; Alexander Shapovalov; Denis Chepikov; Dimitri S. Burykin; Stanislav Zaytsev; Vadim Shpak; Sergey Zuev Sony		3:23
11.	"Bandoleros" (performed by Don Omar featuring Tego Calderón)	Paul Irizarry; Armando Rosario; Tego Calderón; William Omar Landdron	Echo & Disel	5:06
12.	"Rest of My Life" (performed by Ludacris featuring Usher and David Guetta)	Christopher Bridges; David Guetta; Giorgio Tuinfort; Usher Raymond IV; Juan Salinas, Jr.; Oscar Salinas; Marvin Scandrick	David Guetta; Giorgio Tuinfort; Natural (voc.)	3:52
Total length:				50:18

Sample credits

- "Ball" contains elements of "Drag Rap", written by Orville Hall and Phillip Price.

== Charts ==
Chart (2013)	Peak position
Australian Albums (ARIA)	10
Austrian Albums (Ö3 Austria)	6
Belgian Albums (Ultratop Flanders)	37
Belgian Albums (Ultratop Wallonia)	63
Danish Albums (Hitlisten)	32
Dutch Albums (Album Top 100)	77
French Albums (SNEP)	71
German Albums (Offizielle Top 100)	13
New Zealand Albums (RMNZ)	34
Swiss Albums (Schweizer Hitparade)	8
