= Usher Live Evolution 8701 =

Live Evolution 8701

Video by Usher
- Released: November 12, 2002 (U.S.)
- Recorded: June 11, 2002
- Venue: TD Waterhouse Centre (Orlando, Florida)
- Genre: R&B
- Length: 90:00
- Label: LaFace/Arista Records
- Producer: Jermaine Dupri

Usher chronology
| 8701 (2001) | Live Evolution 8701 (2002) | Confessions (2004) |

Live Evolution 8701 is a video by Usher. It was released on November 12, 2002, by LaFace Records and includes all of Usher's top hits up to that time in his career.

== Track listing ==
| No. | Title | Length |
|---|---|---|
| 1. | "National Anthem into bio video" |
| 2. | "I Don't Know" |
| 3. | "If I Want To" (with Johnny's guitar solo) |
| 4. | "Just Like Me" |
| 5. | "I Can't Let U Go" |
| 6. | "Romantic Transition video" |
| 7. | "Bedtime" |
| 8. | "Nice & Slow" |
| 9. | "I Need a Girl (Part One)" |
| 10. | "Twork It Out" |
| 11. | "8701 Interlude" |
| 12. | "U Got It Bad" |
| 13. | "My Way" |
| 14. | "You Make Me Wanna..." |
| 15. | "U Remind Me" |
| 16. | "U Don't Have to Call" |
| 17. | "What's Going On" |

== Bonus features ==
- Rehearsal Song-U Don't Have To Call
- Usher's Bio Video
- Biography & Discography
- Photo Gallery

== Personnel ==
Credits for Live Evolution 8701 adapted from AllMusic.

- Brian Casey - composer
- Jermaine Dupri - composer
- C.D. Hawkins - composer
- Usher Raymond - composer
- Manuel Seal, Jr. - composer
- J. Karen Thomas - composer

== Certifications ==
| Region | Certification | Certified units/sales |
|---|---|---|
| Australia (ARIA) | Gold | 7,500^{^} |
| United Kingdom (BPI) | Gold | 25,000^{^} |
| United States (RIAA) | Platinum | 100,000^{^} |
^{^} Shipments figures based on certification alone.
