= Herald Young Leader =

Indian newspaper

Herald Young Leader (Hindi: हेरल्ड यंग लीडर, romanized: Heralḍa Yaṃga Līḍara) is a Hindi language newspaper published in Surat in Gujarat, India.
