= Crash (Usher song) =

Single by Usher

from the album Hard II Love
- Released: June 10, 2016
- Genre: Electropop
- Length: 3:31
- Label: RCA
- Songwriters: Usher Raymond IV; Lee Stashenko; Carlos St John; Corey "Latif" Williams
- Producers: f a l l e n; Saint Jhn

Usher singles chronology
"No Limit" (2016)	"Crash" (2016)	"Missin U" (2016)

Alternative cover

Music video
- "Crash" on YouTube

"Crash" is a song by American singer Usher, recorded for his eighth studio album, Hard II Love. It was released by RCA on June 10, 2016, available for digital download and online streaming. The audio for the song was also released on his Vevo and YouTube accounts the same day. "Crash" is the follow-up single to "No Limit", released the day before. Both singles appear on Usher's eighth studio album, Hard II Love. The song was written by Usher, Corey Latif, Lee Stashenko, Carlos St. John (Saint Jhn), while production was handled by Saint JHN and f a l l e n.

== Background and release ==
The song was released as the second single from his album Hard II Love.

== Composition ==
A writer from Jezebel wrote the song has a "sub-house BPM of 104, saying “Crash” sits at the humid intersection of Kygo-style tropical house and the futuristic adult contemporary (call it nu-AC) tendencies that are creeping through R&B at the moment."

== Live performances ==
Usher performed the song live for the first time as a part of his headlining set at the "BET Experience", Which he performed his other new single "No Limit" and other old hits including "Yeah!", "U Don't Have to Call", "Love in This Club", and "OMG". On July 28, 2016, Usher performed "Crash" for the first time on television on The Tonight Show Starring Jimmy Fallon. In September he will also perform the song as a part of his set at the iHeartRadio Music Festival 2016.

== Critical reception ==
"Crash" received comparisons to his 2012 Grammy Award-winning single "Climax". Joe Lynch of Billboard called it "post-"Climax", saying "Ush, melding his masterful R&B vocal stylings with the kind of subdued, moody electronics taking over airwaves thanks to Diplo". Christina Lee from Idolator wrote that "Like with “Climax,” this R&B vet makes such vocal prowess — and vulnerability — seem easy." Dennis Edward from Young Herald described the song as a "pulsating banger that does exactly what Climax did hitting us with killer verses and then demure choruses." A writer from Jezebel wrote that in the song, "Spotlit is his gorgeous falsetto much as it was in “Climax,” with which “Crash” shares a sort of spot-the-hook sensibility—it seems to build from one pre-chorus to the next, teetering on the brink of a hook until you realize the whole damn thing is a hook." Sasha Geffen of MTV praised his vocal ability, saying it "soars to the very top of his vocal range, offering a beautiful falsetto chorus against lightweight, delicate production.

== Music video ==
On June 17, 2016, Raymond uploaded the music video for "Crash" on his YouTube and Vevo account. The music video was directed by Christopher Sims. The video begins with Usher dressed all in black laying against a black background. In the video Usher performs an interpretive dance to the lyrics in both solo and in scenes accompanied by two male dancers. Through the video he is singing to a woman, portrayed by model Leslie Allen, in larger-than-life representation that is haunting his thoughts.

The music video on YouTube has received over 25 million views as of May 2024.

== Cover art ==
The single cover art is a sculpture of Usher that was done by Daniel Arsham, which he had to stand still for 4 hours for him to complete. The photo was taken by James Law.

== Credits and personnel ==
Credits adapted from Tidal.

- Usher – lead vocals, composer, lyricist
- Jaycen Joshua – mixing engineer
- Carlos St. John – composer, lyricist, producer
- f a l l e n – producer
- Lee Stashenko – composer, lyricist, producer

== Charts ==
=== Weekly charts ===
Chart (2016)	Peak position
Australia (ARIA)	10
Canada Hot AC (Billboard)	43
France (SNEP)	84
Japan Hot 100 (Billboard)	56
New Zealand Heatseekers (Recorded Music NZ)	6
Scottish Singles Sales (Official Charts)	35
UK Singles (Official Charts)	63
UK Hip Hop/R&B (Official Charts)	20
US Bubbling Under R&B/Hip-Hop Singles (Billboard)	3

=== Year-end charts ===
Chart (2016)	Position
Australia (ARIA)	80
Australia Urban (ARIA)	7

== Certifications ==
Region	Certification	Certified units/sales
Australia (ARIA)	2× Platinum	140,000^{‡}
United Kingdom (BPI)	Silver	200,000^{‡}
^{‡} Sales+streaming figures based on certification alone.
