= I Don't Mind (Usher song) =

Single by Usher featuring Juicy J
- Released: November 21, 2014
- Recorded: 2014
- Genre: Electro-R&B; hip-hop
- Length: 4:12
- Label: RCA
- Songwriters: Usher Raymond IV; Jordan Houston; Lukasz Gottwald; Jacob Kasher Hindlin; Theron Thomas; Timothy Thomas; Henry Walter
- Producers: Dr. Luke; Cirkut; Rock City

Usher singles chronology
"Body Language" (2014)	"I Don't Mind" (2014)	"The Matrimony" (2015)

Juicy J singles chronology
"Multiply" (2014)	"I Don't Mind" (2014)	"For Everybody" (2015)

"I Don't Mind" is a song by American singer Usher, featuring American rapper Juicy J. It was released on November 21, 2014, through RCA Records, as the intended third single from his then-upcoming eighth studio album, Hard II Love. The song's lyrics concern being involved with a stripper, and not being bothered by her line of work.

The song peaked at number 11 on the Billboard Hot 100 and topped the Billboard Hot R&B/Hip Hop Songs chart, becoming his thirteenth number-one single on the chart and tying him with Michael Jackson and Marvin Gaye for sixth place among artists with the most number ones on the chart. Internationally, "I Don't Mind" has peaked within the top ten of the charts in the United Kingdom.

== Background ==
An unfinished version of the track surfaced on June 24, 2014, online to good reception. Usher posted the song to his official SoundCloud account on October 2, 2014, confirming it to be the next official single from his then titled album Flawed.

== Track listing ==
Digital download
No.	Title	Length
1.	"I Don't Mind" (featuring Juicy J)	4:11

== Charts ==
=== Weekly charts ===
Chart (2014–2015)	Peak position
Australia (ARIA)	80
Belgium (Ultratip Bubbling Under Flanders)	34
Belgium Urban (Ultratop Flanders)	24
Belgium (Ultratip Bubbling Under Wallonia)	27
Canada Hot 100 (Billboard)	70
Canada CHR/Top 40 (Billboard)	38
France (SNEP)	99
Hungary (Stream Top 40)	39
Ireland (IRMA)	67
Netherlands (Single Top 100)	64
Scottish Singles Sales (Official Charts)	13
Sweden (Sverigetopplistan)	90
UK Singles (Official Charts)	8
UK Hip Hop/R&B (Official Charts)	3
US Billboard Hot 100	11
US Hot R&B/Hip-Hop Songs (Billboard)	1
US Dance Airplay (Billboard)	20
US Pop Airplay (Billboard)	17
US Rhythmic Airplay (Billboard)	1
US (Monitor Latino)	18

=== Year-end charts ===
Chart (2015)	Position
US Billboard Hot 100	55
US Hot R&B/Hip-Hop Songs (Billboard)	17
US Rhythmic (Billboard)	10

== Certifications ==
Region	Certification	Certified units/sales
Australia (ARIA)	Platinum	70,000^{‡}
Denmark (IFPI Danmark)	Gold	30,000^{^}
New Zealand (RMNZ)	2× Platinum	60,000^{‡}
United Kingdom (BPI)	Platinum	600,000^{‡}
United States (RIAA)	4× Platinum	4,000,000^{‡}
^{^} Shipments figures based on certification alone.^{‡} Sales+streaming figures based on certification alone.

== Release history ==
Country	Date	Format	Label
United States	November 21, 2014	Digital download	RCA
United States	January 20, 2015	Contemporary hit radio	RCA
United Kingdom	March 8, 2015	Digital download	RCA
