= Rivals (song) =

Single by Usher featuring Future

from the album Hard II Love
- Released: August 30, 2016
- Length: 3:49
- Label: RCA
- Songwriters: Usher Raymond IV; Kendricke Brown; Cameron Murphy; Paris Jones; Carlos St John; Nayvadius Wilburn
- Producers: K-Major; Murphy Kid

Usher singles chronology
"Missin U" (2016)	"Rivals" (2016)	"Party" (2016)

Future singles chronology
"Too Much Sauce" (2016)	"Rivals" (2016)	"Used to This" (2016)

Music video
- "Rivals" on YouTube

"Rivals" is a song by American singer Usher, released as the fourth single for his eighth studio album, Hard II Love. The song features the vocal collaboration of American rapper Future. Usher co-wrote the song with Future, Kendricke Brown, Cameron Murphy, Paris Jones, and Carlos St John, while K-Major and Murphy Kid handled the song's production. It was released by RCA on August 30, 2016 for online streaming through the streaming service Tidal. It impacted US urban contemporary radio on September 13, 2016.

== Music video ==
The music video for "Rivals" was filmed in Atlanta, Georgia. It was premiered on August 30, 2016 through the streaming service Tidal. The video featured cameo appearances from Keri Hilson, DJ Drama, Lil Uzi Vert and Swae Lee from Rae Sremmurd.

== Charts ==
=== Weekly charts ===
Chart (2016)	Peak position
New Zealand Heatseekers (Recorded Music NZ)	8
US Bubbling Under R&B/Hip-Hop Singles (Billboard)	8
US Hot R&B Songs (Billboard)	19
US Rhythmic Airplay (Billboard)	37

== Certifications ==
Region	Certification	Certified units/sales
United States (RIAA)	Gold	500,000^{‡}
^{‡} Sales+streaming figures based on certification alone.

== Release history ==
Region	Date	Format	Label	Ref.
United States	13 September 2016	Urban contemporary radio	RCA Records	
United States	4 October 2016	Rhythmic contemporary radio	RCA Records	
