= A (Usher and Zaytoven album) =

Studio album by Usher and Zaytoven
- Released: October 12, 2018
- Recorded: 2018
- Studios: Westlake Recording (West Hollywood, California)
- Genres: R&B; trap
- Length: 27:09
- Labels: Brand Usher; RCA
- Producer: Zaytoven

Usher chronology
Hard II Love (2016)	A (2018)	Coming Home (2024)

Zaytoven chronology
Let the Trap Say Amen (2018)	A (2018)	Greatest Gift (2018)

Singles from A
- 1. "Peace Sign" Released: December 11, 2018

A (2018) is a collaborative studio album by American singer Usher and record producer Zaytoven, the latter of which entirely handling the album's production. Released on October 12, 2018, the album is an homage to the city of Atlanta, where Usher and Zaytoven grew up, featuring guest appearances from fellow Atlanta-based musicians Future and Gunna.

A peaked at number 31 on the US Billboard 200, and received mixed to negative reviews by critics.

== Background and recording ==
On July 25, 2018, Mark Pitts, President of Urban Music at RCA, posted a photo on Instagram of him and Usher working in the studio. Pitts posted another image in September on his Instagram of him, Zaytoven, and Usher in the studio. Zaytoven and Usher previously collaborated on the 2009 single "Papers" from Usher's 2010 album Raymond v. Raymond.

In an interview Usher conducted the Thursday before the album release with The Fader, he said "Zaytoven and I were working on my project, my future album, actually. And we started working on songs, had great combinations between the first two, three, and we kept going."

The album was recorded at Westlake Recording Studios in West Hollywood, California.

== Promotion ==
Usher announced the project on October 11, 2018, with a trailer showing himself and Zaytoven driving around Atlanta and visiting various locations. The trailer also featured various portions of the tracks; alongside this, Usher also posted snippets of the tracks separately on Instagram.

== Artwork and packaging ==
The cover art for the album is designed by American fashion designer Virgil Abloh. The artwork is Abloh's album-themed take of his own signature Off-White branding.

== Critical reception ==
Professional ratings
Review scores
Source	Rating
AllMusic	2.5/5 stars

A received mixed to negative reviews by critics. AllMusic wrote that “A is inspired if mechanical, with Usher's superior vocal dexterity almost neutralized by overly familiar scenarios and materialistic lyrical tropes.” According to Pitchfork writer Briana Younger, "Zaytoven’s minimalist trap isn’t always the ideal match for Usher’s traditional R&B capabilities, but when they push both to their extreme, something magical happens." Elias Leight of Rolling Stone wrote that "On ‘A,’ Usher moves with the times — and that's a bad thing". Medium stated that “the less said about his A EP the better.” Highsnobiety commented that “both Usher and Zaytoven could do much better”. 34th Street Magazine called it an “uneven 27 minutes”, criticizing its “repetitive content and lyrics”.

== Commercial performance ==
A debuted at number 31 on the US Billboard 200 with 15,000 album-equivalent units, which included 4,000 pure album sales.

== Track listing ==
A track listing
No.	Title	Writer(s)	Length
1.	"Stay at Home" (featuring Future)	Usher Raymond IV; Nayvadius Wilburn; Xavier Dotson	3:28
2.	"ATA"	Raymond IV; Dotson; Dimitri Anthony McDowell; Deion Gill; Elliott Trent; Major Myjah	3:07
3.	"Peace Sign"	Raymond IV; Dotson; Trent; Jocelyn A. Donald; McDowell; Deitrick Haddon	2:58
4.	"You Decide"	Raymond IV; Dotson; McDowell; Trent; Tony Wilson; Haddon	3:32
5.	"Birthday"	Raymond IV; Myjah; Dotson; Donald; Carlos Coleman; McDowell; Keith Thomas; Theron Thomas; Timothy Thomas; Deion Gill; Trent; Tugun Cannon; Brian Bates	3:24
6.	"She Ain't Tell Ya"	Raymond IV; Dotson; Wilburn; Mario Jefferson; Darius Ginn, Jr.	3:21
7.	"Say What U Want"	Raymond IV; Myjah; Coleman; Dotson; McDowell; Gill; Trent; Haddon	3:39
8.	"Gift Shop" (featuring Gunna)	Raymond IV; Dotson; Donald; Wilson; Sergio Kitchens	3:41
Total length:			27:09

== Personnel ==
Credits for A adapted from AllMusic.

- Usher Raymond IV – vocals
- Zaytoven – production
- Future – vocals
- Gunna – vocals

== Charts ==
Chart performance for A
Chart (2018)	Peak position
Australian Digital Albums (ARIA)	35
Dutch Albums (Album Top 100)	135
US Billboard 200	31
US Top R&B/Hip-Hop Albums (Billboard)	19
