= Rest of My Life (Ludacris song) =

Single by Ludacris featuring Usher and David Guetta

from the album Fast & Furious 6 (soundtrack) and Ludaversal (intended)
- Released: November 2, 2012
- Recorded: 2012
- Genre: Hip house; electro-house
- Length: 3:52
- Label: Def Jam, Disturbing tha Peace
- Songwriters: David Guetta, Marvin Scandrick, Chris Bridges, Giorgio Tuinfort, Juan "Play" Salinas, Oscar "Skillz" Salinas, Usher Raymond IV, Nick van de Wall, Andy Shearman, Tearce "Kizzo" Keaz, Dorothy Shearman
- Producers: David Guetta, Giorgio Tuinfort, Afrojack

Ludacris singles chronology
"Representin" (2012)	"Rest of My Life" (2012)	"All Around the World" (2013)

Usher singles chronology
"Dive" (2012)	"Rest of My Life" (2012)	"Good Kisser" (2014)

David Guetta singles chronology
"She Wolf (Falling to Pieces)" (2012)	"Rest of My Life" (2012)	"Just One Last Time" (2012)

"Rest of My Life" is a song by American rapper Ludacris, featuring Usher and David Guetta. It was released November 2, 2012 in promotion of his ninth studio album, Ludaversal, which was released on 31 March 2015.

== Background ==
These three artists have had previous collaborations between them. Ludacris and Usher collaborated with Lil Jon on the songs "Yeah!" (heard on Usher's Confessions album) and "Lovers and Friends" (heard on Lil' Jon's Crunk Juice album). Usher was also featured on Guetta's 2011 smash hit single "Without You", on Guetta's album, Nothing but the Beat. Ludacris and Guetta also collaborated with Taio Cruz on the single "Little Bad Girl", also heard on Nothing but the Beat.

== Composition ==
All three artists co-wrote the song with 112 member Slim, Giorgio Tuinfort, and Play-N-Skillz, while production was handled by Guetta and Tuinfort. The song's instrumental hook is similar to that of Afrojack's "Can't Stop Me".

== Release ==
The song was released on November 2, 2012, originally as the third single from Ludacris' ninth studio album, Ludaversal, but like the singles "Jingalin" and "Representin", it wasn't included on the album for unknown reasons. It was, however, featured in the movie Fast & Furious 6 and its soundtrack in which Bridges stars in. The song was heard in TV advertisements for the 2013 movie Battle of the Year. The song was also featured on the compilation album, Now That's What I Call Music! 46.

== Music video ==
A music video to accompany the release of "Rest of My Life" was first released onto YouTube on 11 November 2012 at a total length of four minutes and seven seconds. Los Angeles Clippers point guard Chris Paul and duo Lipari Brothers makes an appearance in the video.

== Track listing ==
Digital download
No.	Title	Length
1.	"Rest of My Life" (feat. Usher & David Guetta)	3:52
2.	"Rest of My Life (Nicky Romero Remix)" (feat. Usher & David Guetta)	5:18
3.	"Rest of My Life (Hard Rock Sofa Remix)" (feat. Usher & David Guetta)	6:39
4.	"Rest of My Life (Daddy's Groove Remix)" (feat. Usher & David Guetta)	4:57
5.	"Rest of My Life (Daddy's Groove Instrumental)" (feat. Usher & David Guetta)	5:41
6.	"Rest of My Life (Original Version Extended)" (feat. Usher & David Guetta)	6:20

== Charts and certifications ==
=== Weekly charts ===
Chart (2012–13)	Peak position
Australia (ARIA)	16
Austria (Ö3 Austria Top 40)	25
Belgium (Ultratip Bubbling Under Flanders)	3
Belgium (Ultratip Bubbling Under Wallonia)	7
Canada (Music Canada)	20
Canada (Canadian Hot 100)	47
Czech Republic (Rádio – Top 100)	32
France (SNEP)	152
Germany (GfK)	32
Ireland (IRMA)	72
New Zealand (Recorded Music NZ)	19
Romania (Romanian Top 100)	50
Scotland (OCC)	30
Slovakia (Rádio Top 100)	93
Switzerland (Schweizer Hitparade)	42
UK Singles (OCC)	41
UK Dance (OCC)	9
US Billboard Hot 100	72
US Pop Airplay (Billboard)	25
US Hot Dance Club Songs (Billboard)	8
US Hot Dance/Electronic Songs (Billboard)	6

=== Year-end charts ===
Chart (2013)	Position
US Hot Dance/Electronic Songs (Billboard)	35

=== Certifications ===
Region	Certification	Certified units/sales
Australia (ARIA)	Platinum	70,000^{^}
New Zealand (RMNZ)	Gold	7,500^{*}
^{*} Sales figures based on certification alone.^{^} Shipments figures based on certification alone.

== Release history ==
Region	Date	Format	Label
[Worldwide]	November 2, 2012	Digital download	The Island Def Jam Music Group
