= Lil Freak =

Single by Usher featuring Nicki Minaj

from the album Raymond v. Raymond
- Released: March 2, 2010
- Studio: No Excuses Studio (Santa Monica, California)
- Genre: Dirty rap; pop-rap
- Length: 3:55
- Label: LaFace
- Songwriters: Usher Raymond; Onika Maraj; Jamal Jones; Ester Dean; Elvis Williams; Stevie Wonder
- Producers: Blac Elvis; Polow da Don

Usher singles chronology
"Hey Daddy (Daddy's Home)" (2009)	"Lil Freak" (2010)	"OMG" (2010)

Nicki Minaj singles chronology
"My Chick Bad" (2010)	"Lil' Freak" (2010)	"Get It All" (2010)

Music video
- "Lil Freak" on YouTube

"Lil Freak" is a song by American singer Usher, taken from his sixth studio album, Raymond v. Raymond. Featuring guest vocals by rapper Nicki Minaj, the song was written by her, Usher, Ester Dean, Blac Elvis and Polow da Don, the latter two producing the track. Its hook is based on a manipulated sample of American soul musician Stevie Wonder's 1973 hit, "Living for the City". "Lil Freak" was released as the second single from the album in the United States and Canada on March 2, 2010.

Carrying a dark tone, composed of heavy bass beats derived from R&B and hip hop music, the lyrics are about the thrill of orchestrating a ménage à trois in a club. The song received positive reviews from critics who complimented its sensual nature. It peaked at number 40 on the Billboard Hot 100, and eight on the Hot R&B/Hip-Hop Songs, becoming Usher's 16th top ten hit on the latter chart. The song's accompanying music video has a secret society concept, dealing with an underground club, playing on the storyline of the song.

== Background ==
In an interview with MTV News when asked if he was just entertaining, Usher said the song was based on real life, stating, "Yeah, I mean, I wrote about it. It happens in this day and time. Those are the best chicks to be friends with, honestly." Usher reiterated his statements in another interview with Access Hollywood, and when asked if he thought the racy lyrics would raise eyebrows, he said it would, commenting that that was an objective of the song. Usher also said that the work was like the dichotomy of Raymond v. Raymond, distinguishing one world from another, as in "playing the nice guy" or "showing the other side." Before official release, the song was leaked onto the Internet in December 2009.

== Composition ==
"Lil Freak" (2010)
A 30 second sample of "Lil Freak" featuring Usher singing the song's chorus, and the intro of Nicki Minaj's verse..

The song is midtempo, with supported by heavy bass beats produced by Polow da Don, which Prefix Magazine called "Jurrasic Park synths". Chris Ryan of MTV News said "Usher pairs off with current queen MC Nicki Minaj, and the two glide over Polow Da Don's minimal bass beat." Sara D. Anderson of AOL Radio Blog said that the "heavy back-beat tune confirms Usher's old ways: "Yeah you the business / So What's the business / Don't be shy, I'm just talkin' to you girl." Tom Breihan of Pitchfork Media called the heavily manipulated "Living for the City" sample, "a monstrous swirl of orchestral exoticism". Minaj makes several puns in her lines, one of them referring to Santa Claus's reindeer in a runthrough which Prefix Magazine reviewed negatively. She also refers to P. Diddy and Cassie in her lines, that she's "plotting on how I can take Cassie away from Diddy".

== Critical reception ==
Critics positively received the song, complimenting Minaj's cameo and the track's production and lyrics. Andrew Winistorfer of Prefix Magazine thought that Usher should have gone with "Lil Freak" as the album's first big single, saying, "It (OMG) doesn't come close to matching the filthy heights of "Little Freak [sic]..." He also said the song was "by a wide margin, the best track to be leaked from Usher's long-delayed Raymond vs. Raymond album". In his initial reaction, he pointed out flaws of the song, but said that the song "could become unavoidable if it gets traction on radio". Chris Ryan of MTV News called the song, "slick, sexy hip-hop-infused R&B done to its finest". He also called the song "nothing short of freak nasty," and "is so full of sexy sexuality that it's enough to make Tiger Woods blush". Vibe magazine commented that "wedding ring is definitely off on this Usher cut", and that Nicki Minaj stole the scene in the song. Pitchfork Media commented favourably on the songs explicit nature, stating the song "isn't some R. Kelly-esque devotional hymn to sexual addiction", and that "The whole towering mess makes a drunken 3 a.m. threesome sound like the most epic endeavor anyone could hope for". The review also compared the song to Justin Timberlake's "Cry Me a River", stating, "it pushes into "Cry Me a River" territory for the same reason that "Cry Me a River" transcended: the gigantic, operatic backing track".

=== Accolades ===
Accolades for "Lil Freak"
Publication	Accolade	Rank
Pitchfork	The Top 100 Tracks of 2010	89
New York Post	The Top 210 Songs of 2010	108

== Chart performance ==
On the week ending March 20, 2010, "Lil Freak" debuted at number 43 on the Billboard Hot 100. It then fell to 66, but rebounded ten spots to 56, and later peaked at 40 on the chart. The song's appearance on the Hot Digital Songs and Hot 100 Airplay charts at number 31 and 37, respectively, helped stabilize its stay on the Hot 100. "Lil Freak" charted at number 28 on the Hot R&B/Hip-Hop Songs months before its release due to it being leaked on the Internet. It eventually peaked at eight, and was Usher's third straight top ten hit on the chart, and 16th overall. According to Nielsen SoundScan, it has sold 508,000 units in the US as of October 3, 2010. Internationally, "Lil Freak" reached 109 on the UK Singles Chart. Usher performed the song in the United Kingdom on The Graham Norton Show on June 7, 2010.

== Music video ==
=== Background and concept ===
Usher and Minaj shot the music video on March 9, 2010 in Los Angeles with director Taj Stansberry, represented by Leah Harmony and Ciarra Pardo. In an interview with Vibe, Stansberry commented on the video's sex appeal and the pairing of Usher and Minaj, stating, "This probably has the potential to be [his sexiest video ever]. Usher’s one of the best entertainers in the world, then you have Nicki Minaj who’s fresh on the scene. Put them together and there’s just sparks, it was real good." When asked about the music video's concept would redefine the word "freak", commenting:

Usher in front of a backdrop with Minaj and dancing and being flaunted by dancers.

"My general idea was to take the word and show its many faceted sides, twisting and turning it to where there’s really no distinguishing between one freak and another. Usher went there. When you’re engaging in sexual activity, there are many transitions and this is not about what they look like literally, but what they look like metaphorically. It’s about luring people into a situation. Because you have your thoughts on a ménage à trois, but then we’re doing it in a non-obvious way."

On Minaj and her pairing with Usher, Stansberry said, " [Nicki] had a few looks that I really liked. She played the part, but still was her. If you really listen to her words in the song, you can kinda visualize her outfit." Stansberry also confirmed that R&B singer Ciara and singer-actor Jamie Foxx would make appearances in the video. In an interview with MTV News on the set of her video for "Massive Attack", Minaj said that "The video is freaky. And it's a great concept, a great story line," Minaj told MTV News. "It felt just like one of the sequels to Saw. It was dope." Stating that the video had a "secret society" concept, Usher told Access Hollywood that the place symbolized locations where people use to get away from pressures, and also said the movie Eyes Wide Shut was some sort of inspiration of the video. On March 22, 2010 a thirty second preview of the music video was surfaced onto the internet. Two days later on March 24, 2010, Usher premiered the full music video on BET's 106 & Park.

=== Synopsis and reception ===
The video begins with a woman walking in a tunnel, and she enters and elevator with Minaj, sporting a Cruella de Vil hairstyle, and other women. The elevator goes to what MTV News calls "Usher's underground playground," then soon finds Usher against a wall. A laptop is shown, and the video goes on to show people who are there, including Ciara playing a casino game. Then, girls are performing choreography on poles, as Usher sings his verses on the wall in the tunnel. Nicki Minaj then comes to sing her verse and starts talking to the unknown woman who was in the tunnel with Usher, and then Minaj guides the woman somewhere. Foxx makes appears near the end of the video, with a red light on him. Usher sings the rest of the song on the wall in the tunnel with choreography from the women, until the video fades out.

BET Sound Off complimented the video and that it stuck to the storyline of the song, stating "there's only but so much you can do with a video like this" without the video being banned, being labelled offensive, or "resemble a video we’ve already seen."

The music video on YouTube has received over 35 million views as of May 2024.

== Credits and personnel ==
Credits adapted from the album's liner notes.

- Songwriting – Usher Raymond, Nicki Minaj, Polow da Don, Blac Elvis, Ester Dean, Stevie Wonder
- Production – Blac Elvis, Polow da Don
- Recording – Jay Stevenson
- Mixing – Jaycen Joshua, assisted by Giancarlo Lino
- Contains a sample from "Living for the City", written and performed by Stevie Wonder, courtesy of Motown Records.

== Charts ==
Weekly chart performance for "Lil Freak"
Chart (2010)	Peak position
UK Singles (OCC)	109
US Billboard Hot 100	40
US Hot R&B/Hip-Hop Songs (Billboard)	8
US Rhythmic Airplay (Billboard)	21

== Certifications ==
Certifications and sales for "Lil Freak"
Region	Certification	Certified units/sales
United States (RIAA)	Platinum	1,000,000^{‡}
^{‡} Sales+streaming figures based on certification alone.

== Release history ==
Release history and formats for "Lil Freak"
Region	Date	Format(s)	Ref.
Canada	March 2, 2010	Digital download	
United States	March 2, 2010	Digital download	
