= Chains (Usher song) =

Single by Usher featuring Nas and Bibi Bourelly

from the album Hard II Love (intended)
- Released: October 16, 2015
- Recorded: 2015
- Genre: R&B; hip hop
- Length: 3:36
- Label: RCA
- Songwriters: Usher Raymond IV; Bibi Bourelly; Nasir Jones
- Producer: Paul Epworth

Usher singles chronology
"Don't Look Down" (2015)	"Chains" (2015)	"Crush" (2016)

Nas singles chronology
"Something to Believe In" (2015)	"Chains" (2015)	"Figure it Out" (2016)

Bibi Bourelly singles chronology
"Riot" (2015)	"Chains" (2015)	"Sally" (2016)

"Chains" is a song by American R&B singer Usher featuring American rapper Nas and German singer-songwriter Bibi Bourelly. It was released on October 15, 2015, as a Tidal exclusive. The song is titled “Chains”, the interactive video experience is called “Don’t Look Away”, using facial recognition technology forcing viewers to watch, to keep their eyes fixed on those of the victims.

== Background and release ==
Trayvon Martin

The song's interactive video experience forces people to confront racial injustice and police brutality. To watch; users must open the video on their computers in Firefox or Chrome and activate their webcam. In the “Chains” it plays the images of Trayvon Martin, Rekia Boyd, Sean Bell, Marlon Brown, Ramarley Graham, Amadou Diallo, Caesar Cruz and other recent victims of police violence. Along with the images it includes descriptions of their deaths, of which no one has been charged or found guilty.

Following the release, Usher led a dialogue alongside civil rights activist Harry Belafonte, rapper Jay-Z and CNN reporter Soledad O’Brien at 92 Y theatre in Manhattan to discuss their commitment to "Breaking the Chains of Social Injustice." During the discussion Usher explained the importance of speaking out against social injustice and explained his partnership with co-owner of Tidal, Jay-Z in mounting the campaign.

== Music video ==
On February 2, 2016, Usher uploaded the standard music video for "Chains" on his YouTube and Vevo account. The video is directed by Ben Louis Nicholas and Daniel Arsham for Film The Future. The black-and-white video begins with the audio of Usher V, his oldest son saying "With liberty and justice for all?" and his youngest son saying "Justice for all". In the video Usher is followed by the police at night and as he runs with hands up, images of guns and people praying are shown. Later, Usher is in a church at his own memorial service, he doesn't understand until he sees the childhood pictures of himself and attempts to grab the attention of the silent mourners. During Nas's verse, Usher is pictured in the back of a police car crying.

== Impact ==
In four days of the release the video was featured on Billboard, Spin, CBS This Morning, NBC, Rolling Stone, Fast Company, The Guardian, The Huffington Post, BET, Entertainment Weekly, Essence, Pitchfork, The Fader, Vibe, NME and Forbes, contributing to more than 500 million earned impressions from more than 100 countries. Celebrities Jay-Z, Beyonce, Steve Harvey, Michael Moore, Pharrell Williams, and Leonardo DiCaprio helped amplified the message by posting on their social media accounts to help make this serious conversation.

== Live performances ==
Usher debuted "Chains" for the first time at the Tidal X: 1020 concert on October 20, 2015, in Brooklyn at the Barclays.

== Personnel ==
Credits adapted from Tidal.

- Writing – Bibi Bourelly, Paul Epworth, Albert Andre Bowman, Nasir Jones, Usher
- Composers - Bibi Bourelly, Paul Epworth, Albert Andre Bowman, Nasir Jones, Usher, Arthur Strong, Issiah J. Avila, Miguel Gandelman, Juan Najera
- Production – Paul Epworth
- Conductor – Sally Herbert
- Mix engineering – Manny Marroquin

== Chart performance ==
Chart (2015)	Peak position
Russia (Airplay)	194
