= She Came to Give It to You =

Single by Usher featuring Nicki Minaj

from the album Hard II Love (Japanese edition)
- Released: July 8, 2014
- Recorded: 2013
- Genre: R&B; disco; funk; soul
- Length: 4:02
- Label: RCA
- Songwriters: Usher Raymond; Pharrell Williams; Onika Maraj
- Producer: Pharrell Williams

Usher singles chronology
"New Flame" (2014)	"She Came to Give It to You" (2014)	"Body Language" (2014)

Nicki Minaj singles chronology
"Pills n Potions" (2014)	"She Came to Give It to You" (2014)	"Bang Bang" (2014)

Music video
- "She Came to Give It to You" on YouTube

"She Came to Give It to You" (also titled "She Came II Give It II U") is a song by American singer Usher, featuring Nicki Minaj and uncredited vocals from Pharrell Williams. It was released on July 8, 2014, through RCA Records. RCA Records sent the song to US rhythmic contemporary and contemporary hit radio on July 14, 2014. Originally intended to be the second single from his eighth studio album Hard II Love, the song was scrapped from the standard edition track listing, with the track only being included on the Japanese edition of the album.

Minaj first mentioned the video in an interview with MTV, and was licensed to General Mills for its use in a new Honey Nut Cheerios commercial featuring Usher himself, debuting on August 25, 2014. The song quoted part of the lyrical melody of "Just Be Good to Me", a 1983 single by The S.O.S. Band, written and produced by Jimmy Jam & Terry Lewis and "Got to Give It Up" from Marvin Gaye.

== Music video ==
On August 26, 2014, a music video for the track was released. Influenced by the rhythm beats of Haitian Rara bass horn. The music video on YouTube has received over 10 million views as of May 2024.

== Live performances ==
On August 24, 2014, Usher performed the song with Nicki Minaj at 2014 MTV Video Music Awards. On September 5, 2014, he performed the song live on Today as the closing act of its Summer Concert Series. On September 9, 2014, Usher performed the song live at the 2014 Fashion Rocks. On September 19, 2014, Usher performed the song as part of his headlining act at the 2014 iHeartRadio Music Festival. He also performed the song live as a part of his UR Experience Tour.On October 13, 2014, YouTube personality Bethany Mota and her switch-up partner Mark Ballas performed a hip hop routine to the song on Dancing with the Stars. They received a composite score of 32.

== Charts and certifications ==
=== Weekly charts ===
Chart (2014)	Peak position
Australia (ARIA)	32
Belgium (Ultratip Bubbling Under Flanders)	42
Belgium Dance (Ultratop Flanders)	22
Belgium Urban (Ultratop Flanders)	5
Canada Hot 100 (Billboard)	56
Canada CHR/Top 40 (Billboard)	36
Canada Hot AC (Billboard)	47
France (SNEP)	38
Germany (GfK)	30
Lebanon (The Official Lebanese Top 20)	17
Netherlands Dance (Mega Dance Top 20)	24
Scotland Singles (OCC)	15
Switzerland (Schweizer Hitparade)	74
UK Singles (OCC)	16
UK Hip Hop/R&B (OCC)	3
US Billboard Hot 100	89
US Hot R&B/Hip-Hop Songs (Billboard)	27
US Rhythmic Airplay (Billboard)	17

=== Year-end charts ===
Chart (2014)	Position
France (SNEP)	147

=== Certifications ===
Region	Certification	Certified units/sales
Australia (ARIA)	Platinum	70,000^{‡}
^{‡} Sales+streaming figures based on certification alone.

== Release history ==
Release dates and formats for "She Came to Give It to You"
Region	Date	Format	Label(s)	Ref.
United States	July 22, 2014	Mainstream airplay	RCA	
