= Hard II Love =

Studio album by Usher
- Released: September 16, 2016
- Recorded: 2013–2016
- Genre: R&B
- Length: 57:30
- Labels: Coup D'Etat; RCA
- Producers: B. A. M.; Rock City; Pop & Oak; Raphael Saadiq; Tricky Stewart; The-Dream; Metro Boomin; PartyNextDoor; D'Mile; Frank Dukes; Paul Epworth; R!O; Kamo; f a l l e n; Carlos St John; Fisticuffs; J. Hill; Tane Runo; Geniuz League; K-Major; xSDTRK

Usher chronology
Looking 4 Myself (2012)	Hard II Love (2016)	A (2018)

Singles from Hard II Love
- 1. "No Limit" Released: June 9, 2016; 2. "Crash" Released: June 10, 2016; 3. "Missin U" Released: August 26, 2016; 4. "Rivals" Released: August 30, 2016

Hard II Love is the eighth studio album by American singer Usher. It was released on September 16, 2016, by RCA Records. Recording sessions took place from 2013 to 2016, including the executive production from Usher, alongside Mark Pitts, Jaha Johnson, and its co-production by Coup D'état. It features contributions for its album's production by Brandon "B.A.M." Hodge, Rock City, Pop & Oak, PartyNextDoor, D'Mile, Tricky Stewart, The-Dream, Metro Boomin, and Raphael Saadiq, among others. The album was supported by four singles: "No Limit" featuring Young Thug, "Crash", "Missin U" and "Rivals" featuring Future.

The album was available for online streaming on September 13, 2016 exclusively through the streaming service Tidal, which Usher co-owns. It would later be released for paid purchase on other digital download and online streaming services on September 16, 2016. The album debuted at number five on the US Billboard 200, earning 38,000 album-equivalent units in its first week, while the lead single "No Limit" reached the top 40 on the Billboard Hot 100.

== Background ==
In an interview with Rap-Up, singer-songwriter Eric Bellinger explained that he, along with Jermaine Dupri, Bryan-Michael Cox, and Brian Alexander Morgan, were working on Usher's next album. Bellinger compared the album's music to Usher's Confessions, saying that it is "more urban" than Looking 4 Myself. The latter declared that his next album would show that he is "still Usher". In an interview with Billboard, Bellinger explained that Usher created music for his previous albums based on what people wanted to hear. For his follow-up project, he chose to do music based on "what he wants to do in his heart", placing R&B as the album's main focus.

On January 6, 2014, RCA Records CEO Peter Edge described Usher's album as "one of his best records," and stated that new music from the record would be released in conjunction with his return on the sixth season of The Voice, on February 24. The album would feature several guest appearances and contributions from Nicki Minaj, Pop & Oak, Steve Mostyn of Public School, Pharrell Williams, Jermaine Dupri, Diplo, Ed Sheeran, Skrillex, Drake and Chris Brown. Usher teamed up with Honey Nut Cheerios in a joint promotional effort, where the singer is shown dancing to the album's second single, "She Came to Give It to You" with the Honey Nut Cheerios bee. During the outset of the commercial, the album's title was rumored to be UR, the singer's initials.

On September 8, 2014, Usher told Billboard, that the album would be indefinitely delayed, though he wouldn't divulge further details due to the album not being finished; it was to be originally released in September 2014. On January 14, 2016, after continual delays of his eighth album, Usher announced via Instagram that the official title of the album would be titled Flawed. In August 2016, an iTunes New Zealand link popped up with a new Usher album, along with the title and cover art of the album being called Hard II Love. He then confirmed the title on the late-night talk show Jimmy Kimmel Live!.

=== Cover artwork ===
The album's cover art is a portrait sculpture of Usher that was done by Daniel Arsham. The cracks and erosions in the sculpture represent flaws and that things and people are not always as perfect or beautiful as they appear on the outside, relating to some of the themes in the album.

== Promotion ==
On August 26, 2016, Usher released the instant-grats from these tracks, such as "Missin U" and "Champions", with the latter to be featured on the upcoming boxing film Hands of Stone, where Usher portrays Sugar Ray Leonard. On September 2, 2016, Usher appeared on the BBC Radio 1, Live Lounge, where he performed "No Limit" and "Crash" as well as singles from his previous albums. Usher performed "Crash" on The Tonight Show with Jimmy Fallon and The Ellen Show. Usher held multiple private listening sessions for Hard II Love. On September 13, 2016, Usher had an exclusive playback listening session put on by Tidal held at the Ace Theatre in Los Angeles, California. Radio host Big Boy led the intimate session, where Usher talked about the new album track-by-track. On September 16, 2016, the evening of his album release, Usher hosted and performed songs from the album at his private listening party hosted by iHeartRadio and AT&T Live at Pier 15 in New York City.

== Singles ==
On June 9, 2016, Usher released the album's first single, titled "No Limit" to the music streaming platform Tidal. The song features guest rap verse from an American rapper Young Thug, with production by B. A. M. and Rock City. Usher performed it at the BET Experience and first live televised performance of the song at 2016's BET Awards, which took place at the Microsoft Theater in Los Angeles, California on June 26, 2016. The song peaked at number 32 on the US Billboard Hot 100, number 9 on the US Hot R&B/Hip-Hop Songs, and at number 4 on the rhythmic charts.

The album's second single, titled "Crash" was released for all digital platforms on June 10, 2016. Its music video was uploaded to Vevo on June 16, 2016. The song was produced by f a l l e n, and Carlos St. John.

On August 26, 2016, "Missin U" was released for online streaming and digital download, along with "Champions". The former was produced by Pop Wansel and Autoro Whitfield. "Missin U" impacted US urban adult contemporary radio as the album's third single on September 13, 2016.

On August 30, 2016, Usher released "Rivals" and its accompanying music video on Tidal. The song features guest rap verse from an Atlanta-native and fellow American hip hop recording artist Future, with production by K-Major and Murphy Kid. "Rivals" impacted US urban adult contemporary radio as the album's fourth single on September 13, 2016.

== Critical reception ==
Professional ratings
Aggregate scores
Source	Rating
AnyDecentMusic?	6.9/10
Metacritic	74/100
Review scores
Source	Rating
AllMusic	4/5 stars
Entertainment Weekly	B−
Idolator	3.5/5 stars
The Independent	4/5 stars
The National	1.5/5 stars
Pitchfork	6.6/10
PopMatters	5/10 stars
Rolling Stone	4/5 stars
USA Today	3/4 stars

Hard II Love received generally positive reviews from critics. At Metacritic, which assigns a normalized rating out of 100 to reviews from mainstream publications, the album received an average score of 74, based on 8 reviews. Maura Johnston of Rolling Stone expresses that Hard II Love, "stretches the boundaries of R&B while winding toward the brooding atmospherics that have enveloped much of pop over the past 12 months." Chris DeVille of Stereogum wore that the album "suggests Usher will continue to make hits, headline arenas, and be one of the world's most beloved musical superstars. The guy's natural singing prowess and effortless ability to jump across genre make him a national treasure. In just about every context, he sounds like a pro." Medium said that “Hard II Love lived up to its name with heavy-handed hip-hop records that felt like Chris Brown Cosplay”.

John Pareles of The New York Times commented "he has all the gifts and skills he needs, starting with a genuinely expressive voice that encompasses an ardent croon, a melting falsetto and quick, singsong declamation that puts him at the border of rapping. Told Wright from Vulture wrote "the album is a true return to form for the R&B artist, complete with falsetto crooning and sexy bed-thumping beats". Ira Madison III from MTV wrote that "sexy bangers like 'Bump,' 'Tell Me,' and 'Make U a Believer', helps Usher meets his goals and then some on Hard II Love after seeing few years 'experimenting' with music, he told us, now he's ready to release a classic R&B album again". John Reyes of Idolator wrote Hard II Love is impressive because it shows an R&B vet who's been around for two decades and has sold 43 million albums worldwide. Clover Hope of Jezebel complimented Usher's vocals, saying that "his seamless melodies and fluid vocal strokes remain leaps and bounds ahead of his peers". AllMusic's Andy Kellman felt that Hard II Love "is the most pleasing Usher album in over a decade. In terms of ability, agility, and creativity, Usher's vocals still crush the commercial competition."

== Commercial performance ==
Hard II Love debuted at number five on the US Billboard 200, earning 38,000 album-equivalent units (including 28,000 copies as pure album sales) in its first week. This became Usher's eighth US top-ten album. The album was also streamed 10.7 million times on Tidal in the first week. On February 9, 2024, the album was certified gold by the Recording Industry Association of America (RIAA) for combined sales and album-equivalent units of over 500,000 units in the United States.

== Track listing ==
Hard II Love – North American Standard version
No.	Title	Writer(s)	Producer(s)	Length
1.	"Need U" (Conversation with Priyanka Chopra)	Paris Jones; Albert Bowman; Paul Epworth; Faheem Mardre; Robert Calloway; Juan Najera	Epworth	4:08
2.	"Missin U"	Usher Raymond IV; Andrew "Pop" Wansel; Autoro Whitfield; Faheem Mardre; Robert Calloway; Warren "Oak" Felder; Walter Becker; Donald Fagen	Pop Wansel; Toro	4:09
3.	"No Limit" (featuring Young Thug)	Raymond IV; Brandon Hodge; Christopher Perry; Theron Thomas; Timothy Thomas; Keith Thomas; Jeffrey Williams	B.A.M.; Rock City	3:48
4.	"Bump"	Raymond IV; Terius Nash; Christopher Stewart; Jonathan Smith; Luther Campbell	The-Dream; Tricky Stewart	4:07
5.	"Let Me"	Raymond IV; Jahron Brathwaite; David Hughes; Melvin Riley	PartyNextDoor; David Hughes	3:09
6.	"Downtime"	Raymond IV; Mario Jefferson; Darius Ginn, Jr.	R!O; Kamo	3:28
7.	"Crash"	Raymond IV; Lee Stashenko; Carlos St John; Corey Williams	f a l l e n; St. John	3:31
8.	"Make U a Believer"	Raymond IV; Leland Wayne; Adam Feeney; Tommy Paxton-Beesley	Metro Boomin; Frank Dukes	4:06
9.	"Mind of a Man"	Raymond IV; Dernst Emile II	D'Mile	0:53
10.	"FWM"	Raymond IV; Emile II; Paris Jones	D'Mile	3:14
11.	"Rivals" (featuring Future)	Raymond IV; Kendricke "K-Major" Brown; Cameron "Murphy Kid" Murphy; Paris Jones; St. John; Nayvadius Wilburn	K-Major; Murphy Kid	3:49
12.	"Tell Me"	Raymond IV; Trevian "Tre Drumz" Chandler; George "Geniuz League" Johnson; Ryan Toby; Nazir Assad	Tre Drumz; Geniuz League; Track King Cole; Toby	8:29
13.	"Hard II Love"	Raymond IV; Bibi Bourelly; Yonatan Ayal	xSDTRK	3:22
14.	"Stronger"	Raymond IV; Titus "Marko Penn" Stubblefield; Yonatan Ayal; Joseph Hill, Jr.; Taji Ausar; Andrew Fridge; Elley Duhe; Zachary Williams	J. Hill; Tane Runo	4:00
15.	"Champions" (with Rubén Blades / from the Motion Picture 'Hands of Stone')	Raymond IV; Rubén Blades; Raphael Saadiq; Taura Stinson	Saadiq	5:17
Total length:				57:30

Hard II Love – Japan version (bonus tracks)
No.	Title	Writer(s)	Producer(s)	Length
16.	"Good Kisser"	Raymond IV; Andrew Wansel; Ronald "Flippa" Colson; Jameel Roberts; Terry Sneed; Warren Felder; Bobby Bloom; Jeff Barry	Pop; Flippa; JProof; Tru; Natural; Oak	4:09
17.	"She Came to Give It to You" (featuring Nicki Minaj)	Raymond IV; Onika Maraj; Pharrell Williams	Pharrell Williams	4:02
Total length:				65:41

Sample credits

- "Missin U" contains a sample of "Third World Man" performed by Steely Dan, written by Walter Becker and Donald Fagen.
- "Bump" contains a sample of "I Wanna Rock" performed by Luke, written by Luther Campbell.
- "Let Me" contains a sample of "Love You Down" performed by Ready for the World, written by Melvin C. Riley.

== Personnel ==
Credits for Hard II Love adapted from AllMusic.

Managerial

- Usher Raymond IV – executive producer
- Mark Pitts – executive producer, A&R
- Jaha Johnson – co-executive producer
- Coup D'état – co-executive producer
- Keith Thomas – A&R consultant, vocal producer
- Leticia Hillard – A&R consultant
- Randy Warnken – assistant
- Jason Stanulis – assistant
- Riley McIntyre – assistant
- Jeff Jackson – assistant
- Brandon Harding – assistant
- Nicholas Essig – assistant
- Jacob Dennis – assistant
- Maddox Chhim – assistant
- Jeremy Brown – assistant
- Calvin Bailiff – assistant

- Nico Raat – Security director

Visuals and imagery

- Daniel Arsham – art direction, sculpture
- Steve Ramirez – design
- James Law – photography
- D.L. Warfield – album and song title illustration

Performance credits

- Usher Raymond IV – primary artist
- Young Thug – featured artist
- Future – featured artist
- Rubén Blades – featured artist
- Priyanka Chopra – vocals
- Lil Jon – vocals
- Uncle Luke – vocals

Production

- Dernst Emile II – producer
- Metro Boomin – producer
- PartyNextDoor – producer
- Brandon "B.A.M." Hodge – producer
- Pop & Oak – producer
- R!O – producer
- Kamo – producer
- Tre Drumz – producer
- Carlos St. John – producer
- f a l l e n – producer
- Fisticuffs – producer
- Geniuz League – producer
- xSDTRK – producer
- K-Major – producer
- Raphael Saadiq – producer
- Mario Jefferson – producer
- David "Prep" Hughes – producer
- Joseph Hill – producer
- Track King Cole – producer
- Yonatan "xSDTRK" Ayal – producer, programming
- Paul Epworth – producer, programming
- Taura Stinson – vocal arrangement
- Kory Aaron – engineer, vocal engineer
- Matt Wiggins – engineer
- Sam Thomas – engineer
- John "J-Banga" Kercy – engineer
- Joseph Hartwell Jones – engineer
- Seth Firkins – engineer
- Jeff Edwards – engineer
- Donnie Meadows – production coordination
- Manny Marroquin – mixing
- Tom Coyne – mastering

== Charts ==
=== Weekly charts ===
Chart (2016)	Peak position
Australian Albums (ARIA)	5
Belgian Albums (Ultratop Flanders)	41
Belgian Albums (Ultratop Wallonia)	51
Canadian Albums (Billboard)	20
Dutch Albums (Album Top 100)	38
French Albums (SNEP)	69
German Albums (Offizielle Top 100)	55
Irish Albums (IRMA)	77
New Zealand Heatseekers Albums (RMNZ)	1
Scottish Albums (Official Charts)	34
South Korean Albums (Gaon Chart)	30
Swiss Albums (Schweizer Hitparade)	27
UK Albums (Official Charts)	7
UK R&B Albums (Official Charts)	1
US Billboard 200	5
US Top R&B/Hip-Hop Albums (Billboard)	2

=== Year-end charts ===
Chart (2016)	Position
US Top R&B/Hip-Hop Albums (Billboard)	45

== Certifications ==
Region	Certification	Certified units/sales
United States (RIAA)	Gold	500,000^{‡}
^{‡} Sales+streaming figures based on certification alone.

== See also ==
- 2016 in hip hop music
- List of UK R&B Albums Chart number ones of 2016
- List of Billboard number-one R&B albums of 2016
- PBR&B
