= Good Kisser =

Single by Usher

from the album Hard II Love (Japanese edition)
- Released: May 5, 2014
- Genre: R&B; funk
- Length: 4:09 (single version); 3:49 (radio edit)
- Label: RCA
- Songwriters: Usher Raymond IV; Andrew "Pop" Wansel; Ronald "Flippa" Colson; Jameel Roberts; Terry Sneed; Warren "Oak" Felder; Bobby Bloom; Jeff Barry
- Producers: Pop & Oak; Flippa; JProof; Tru; Natural

Usher singles chronology
| "Rest of My Life" (2012) | "Good Kisser" (2014) | "New Flame" (2014) |

Music video
- "Good Kisser" on YouTube

"Good Kisser" is a song by American singer Usher. The single was released on May 5, 2014, by RCA Records. The accompanying music video debuted the same day. The song was written by Andrew "Pop" Wansel, Bobby Bloom, Jeff Barry, Ronald "Flippa" Colson, Jameel Roberts, Terry Sneed and Warren "Oak" Felder, with co-writing done by Usher, produced by Pop Wansel and Co-produced by Ronald "Flippa" Colson, Jproof, Terry "Tru" Sneed, Natural and Oak Felder. Originally intended to be the lead single from his eighth studio album, Hard II Love, the song was scrapped from the standard edition track listing, with the track only being included on the Japanese edition of the album.

In North America, the song reached number 65 on the US Billboard Hot 100, number one on the Hot R&B/Hip-Hop Airplay chart, and number 14 on the Rhythmic Songs chart. It also charted in Australia, Flanders, France, Germany, the Netherlands and South Korea. "Good Kisser" was ranked at number two on Billboard's "10 Best R&B Songs on 2014" list. It was nominated for Best R&B Song and Best R&B Performance at the 57th Annual Grammy Awards.

== Background ==
"Good Kisser" was supposed to be a track from his upcoming eighth studio album, Flawed, which Usher announced was in the works on March 19, 2013. Talking to The Fader, he described the album as "everything you can imagine", saying that it's "gonna be freaking out of here". In an interview with Eric Bellinger by Rap-Up, the former explained that he, along with Jermaine Dupri, Bryan-Michael Cox, and Brian Alexander Morgan, were working on Usher's next album. Bellinger compared the album's music to Usher's Confessions (2004), saying that it is "more R&B, more urban" than Usher's Looking 4 Myself. The latter declared that his next album would show that he is "still Usher". The official remix features an additional verse from Rick Ross.

== Production and composition ==
"Good Kisser" was written by Andrew "Pop" Wansel, Ronald "Flippa" Colson, Jameel Roberts, Terry Sneed and Warren "Oak" Felder, with co-writing done by Usher. It was produced by Pop Wansel, with co-production handled by Ronald "Flippa" Colson, JProof, Terry "Tru" Sneed, Natural and Oak Felder. In an interview, Pop discussed how the song was conceived:

"...a lot of times when I wake up singing something random, it turns into a song. So I woke up one morning just singing 'Don't nobody kiss it like you baby,' and I was just singing it all day long. [...] Later that night, I went to the studio and just put it all down, then forgot about it.

Pop later went to a Los Angeles studio to show the song to Mark Pitts, who later gave it to Usher for him to perform. Usher made some lyrical changes to the song, including the change of the word "suck" to "kiss" in order to make the song less "X-rated".

"Good Kisser" is an uptempo "stripped-back soul-funk" R&B song that has a "sensuous, sturdy bassline", "salsa drums", a "dusty vinyl pops", '"Rich Harrison-recalling" "cowbell-heavy percussion", "jazzy keyboards", "handclaps" and Usher's "loose vocal delivery". According to Rolling Stone writer Ryan Reed, the lyrics consist of "praising one particular set of lips", "setting the scene with lots of specific imagery". Consequence of Sound's "Good Kisser" described the lyrics as a mix between "[19]60s pop innocence and slightly naughtier, early ’90s R&B fare a la Bell Biv DeVoe". There are also "awesome innuendos and racy metaphors" in the song as well. Idolator's Carl Williott suggested the song wasn't about kissing, but rather an ode to oral sex. In addition, in the song Usher states that he has "lipstick on his leg".

"Good Kisser" samples the song "Montego Bay" performed by Foster Sylvers, featured on the album Foster Sylvers featuring Pat and Angie Sylvers.

== Release and reception ==
In most countries, except for the United Kingdom, "Good Kisser" was issued as a single, by RCA Records on May 5, 2014. RCA issued the single in the UK on June 15. It was Usher's first solo release since his song, "Scream" (2012). Two teasers of the song and video had been released previously, one on April 29, and another one on May 2. The track was sent to Urban adult contemporary radio stations in the United States on May 12, where on that same day, he also made a performance debut of the song on The Voice.

On the week that was issued May 24, 2014, "Good Kisser" landed a hot shot debut on the US Billboard Hot 100 at number 70, and on the Hot R&B/Hip-Hop Songs chart at number 18. It also made a debut on the Rhythmic Songs chart at number 32. The track was downloaded more than 29,000 times and got 13 million radio plays on the week ending May 11. While dropping to number 73 on the Hot 100 and number 20 on the Hot R&B/Hip-Hop Songs chart the next week, it had also made a new peak on the Rhythmic Songs chart of the twenty-fourth place. After a few weeks, the song reached number 65 on the Hot 100 issue dated June 28. In Europe, the song debuted at number 70 on the Belgian Flanders Ultratip chart, number 27 on the Flanders Urban chart, and number 133 in France. It made its start at number 44 and number seven on the ARIA pop and urban charts respectively, both official record chart of the Oceania country of Australia. In Asia, it debuted at number 36 on the South Korean International chart, with sales of 329,520.

Reviews for "Good Kisser" have been mixed. Rolling Stone writer Jon Dolan, giving it a 2.5 out of 5 star, called it a "half-mast funk-soul jam", say that it was "like watching a guy rev his engine for five minutes and never leave the driveway". In July 2014, Billboard listed "Good Kisser" as one of the "10 Best Songs of 2014 (so far)" saying that the song "simmers without boiling but leaves listeners fully satisfied".

== Music video ==
"Good Kisser"'s accompanying music video, directed by Christopher Sims, was released on May 5, the same day of the release of the single. An official behind-the-scenes video came out on May 14. The video shows Usher dancing and drumming shirtless, and features model Felicia Fo Porter. USA Today's Patrick Ryan described the video as "Pharrell's "Marilyn Monroe" video, only with fewer Smokey the Bear hats". As of May 2024 the video has over 65 million views.

== Track listings ==
- Digital download
1. "Good Kisser" – 4:09
- Digital download
1. "Good Kisser" (Disclosure remix) – 4:49

== Charts ==
=== Weekly charts ===
| Chart (2014) | Peak; position |
|---|---|
| Australia (ARIA) | 44 |
| Australia Urban (ARIA) | 7 |
| Belgium (Ultratip Bubbling Under Flanders) | 27 |
| Belgium Urban (Ultratop Flanders) | 25 |
| Belgium (Ultratip Bubbling Under Wallonia) | 32 |
| France (SNEP) | 133 |
| Germany (Deutsche Black Charts) | 2 |
| Netherlands (Dutch Top 40 Tipparade) | 14 |
| Netherlands (Single Top 100) | 89 |
| Scotland Singles (OCC) | 19 |
| South Africa (EMA) | 6 |
| South Korea (Gaon) | 150 |
| South Korea International Songs (Gaon) | 14 |
| UK Singles (OCC) | 10 |
| UK Hip Hop/R&B (OCC) | 3 |
| US Billboard Hot 100 | 65 |
| US Hot R&B/Hip-Hop Songs (Billboard) | 17 |
| US R&B/Hip-Hop Airplay (Billboard) | 1 |
| US Adult R&B Songs (Billboard) | 2 |
| US Rhythmic Airplay (Billboard) | 14 |

=== Year-end charts ===
| Chart (2014) | Position |
|---|---|
| US Hot R&B/Hip-Hop Songs (Billboard) | 49 |

== Certifications ==
| Region | Certification | Certified units/sales |
|---|---|---|
| United Kingdom (BPI) | Silver | 200,000^{‡} |
| United States (RIAA) | Platinum | 1,000,000^{‡} |
^{‡} Sales+streaming figures based on certification alone.

== Release history ==
| Region | Date | Format | Label |
|---|---|---|---|
| Australia | May 5, 2014 | Digital download | RCA |
| Austria | May 5, 2014 | Digital download | RCA |
| Belgium | May 5, 2014 | Digital download | RCA |
| Canada | May 5, 2014 | Digital download | RCA |
| Denmark | May 5, 2014 | Digital download | RCA |
| Finland | May 5, 2014 | Digital download | RCA |
| France | May 5, 2014 | Digital download | RCA |
| Germany | May 5, 2014 | Digital download | RCA |
| Ireland | May 5, 2014 | Digital download | RCA |
| Italy | May 5, 2014 | Digital download | RCA |
| Japan | May 5, 2014 | Digital download | RCA |
| Latin America | May 5, 2014 | Digital download | RCA |
| Luxembourg | May 5, 2014 | Digital download | RCA |
| Mexico | May 5, 2014 | Digital download | RCA |
| Netherlands | May 5, 2014 | Digital download | RCA |
| Norway | May 5, 2014 | Digital download | RCA |
| New Zealand | May 5, 2014 | Digital download | RCA |
| Spain | May 5, 2014 | Digital download | RCA |
| Sweden | May 5, 2014 | Digital download | RCA |
| Switzerland | May 5, 2014 | Digital download | RCA |
| United States | May 5, 2014 | Digital download | RCA |
| United States | May 12, 2014 | Urban adult contemporary radio | RCA |
| United Kingdom | May 12, 2014 | Urban contemporary radio | RCA |
| United Kingdom | June 22, 2014 | Digital download | RCA |
