= Crunk Juice =

Studio album by Lil Jon & the East Side Boyz
- Released: November 16, 2004
- Recorded: 2003–04
- Genre: Crunk; Southern hip-hop; dirty rap; hardcore hip-hop; gangsta rap; rap metal
- Length: 74:54
- Label: BME; TVT
- Producer: Lil Jon (exec.); Bryan Leach (exec.); Rob McDowell (exec.; Emperor Searcy (exec.); Vincent "Vince" Phillips (exec.); Lil Jay; Young Snipe; Rick Rubin; DJ Flexx; Scotty Beats; The Neptunes

Lil Jon & the East Side Boyz chronology
Part II (2003)	Crunk Juice (2004)

Singles from Crunk Juice
- 1. "What U Gon' Do" Released: November 2, 2004; 2. "Lovers & Friends" Released: November 9, 2004; 3. "Real Nigga Roll Call" Released: December 21, 2004

Crunk Juice is the fifth and final studio album by American Southern hip-hop group Lil Jon & the East Side Boyz. It was released on November 16, 2004, under BME Recordings and TVT Records. The production was primarily handled by Lil Jon himself, who also collaborated in the executive production, alongside Bryan Leach, Rob McDowell, Emperor Searcy, Vince Phillips, the Neptunes and Rick Rubin. The album includes guest appearances from R. Kelly, Ludacris, Ice Cube, Usher, Bun B from UGK, Jadakiss, Nas, T.I., Ying Yang Twins and Pharrell.

== Singles ==
Crunk Juice was supported by four singles.

Lead single "What U Gon' Do" was released on November 2, 2004.

The second single "Lovers & Friends", was released on November 9, 2004.

The third single "Real Nigga Roll Call", was released on December 21, 2004.

The fourth single "Get Crunk", was released on vinyl.

== Commercial performance ==
Crunk Juice debuted at number 31 on the US Billboard 200 chart. In its second week, the album jumped to number three on the Billboard 200, selling 363,000 copies. It became Lil Jon & the East Side Boyz' first top-ten album in the United States. In the third week, the album remained in the top-ten on the Billboard 200, selling 196,000 copies. The album was certified 2x Multi-Platinum by the RIAA on January 12, 2005.

== Critical reception ==
Professional ratings
Review scores
Source	Rating
AllHipHop	3.5/5 stars
AllMusic	4/5 stars
Atlanta Journal-Constitution	C+
Entertainment Weekly	C
The Guardian	3/5 stars
NME	4/10
Prefix	2.5/5 stars
RapReviews	8/10
Rolling Stone	3/5 stars
Stylus	B+
USA Today	3/4 stars

Crunk Juice received a wide range of reviews. Rating the album four stars out of five, David Jeffries of AllMusic called the album "just as exciting and remarkably powerful" as Back in Black by AC/DC, adding: "Production by production, record by record, Lil Jon has become a more detailed producer." Steve Jones of USA Today, rating the album three out of four stars, praised the album for "show[ing] that crunk comes in more than one flavor" in the R&B-themed "Lovers & Friends" and what he called an "experiment in crunk rock" in the Rick Rubin-produced "Stop Fuckin' With Me".

In contrast, for a three-and-a-half stars out of five review, Orisanmi Burton of AllHipHop commented: "What the album lacks in artistry and maturity, it makes up for in energy and rhythm." Critics in Lil Jon's hometown Atlanta also offered mixed reviews. Sonia Murray of The Atlanta Journal-Constitution called Lil Jon a "more numbingly simple chanter than noteworthy rapper...[who] now has the cachet to get A-list acts to join in on the inanity."Creative Loafing Atlanta expressed shock at the presence of "Lovers & Friends", with one critic calling it "something they'd play at an eighth-grade dance." Neil Drumming of Entertainment Weekly graded the album with a C, calling the songs "practically all hook...recited ad nauseam in Jon’s throaty growl...with over-the-top vitriolic rants and nausea-inducing misogyny."

Other reviews were more scathing. Lee Henderson of PopMatters called Lil Jon "the Raffi of gangsta rap" due to "reduc[ing] rap to endless and incredibly stupid choruses of nasty-talk" in the album. Matt Ozga of Prefix panned the album for what he called Lil Jon's "questionable ability as a producer" and "fingernails-on-an-eardrum voice" and lyrics with "vile, witless anti-woman venom", in rating the album 2.5 out of five points. Pete Cashmore of NME rated the album four points out of 10: "It’s almost laughably one-note, devoid of nuance, stunted of vocabulary and aeons too long."

== Flavored malt beverage ==
Crunk Juice is also the name of a once popular flavoured malt beverage launched by Gila Brew Co., LLC. It was made by 7th Street Brewing. They announced in 2011 they were going to relaunch the brand and have new package designs and a new flavours with a smoother taste. It was made available to purchase in several major US cities like Philadelphia.

== Track listing ==
No.	Title	Writer(s)	Producer(s)	Length
1.	"Crunk Juice"	Jonathan Smith; Robert McDowell; Sammie Norris	Lil Jon	0:57
2.	"Get Crunk" (featuring Bo Hagon)	Smith; Cederic Leonard; McDowell; Norris	Lil Jon; Lil Jay	4:18
3.	"What U Gon' Do" (featuring Lil Scrappy)	Smith; Darryl Richardson III; McDowell; Norris	Lil Jon	5:20
4.	"Real Nigga Roll Call" (featuring Ice Cube)	Smith; O.B. Jackson; McDowell; Norris	Lil Jon	5:08
5.	"Bo Hagon's Phone Call (skit)" (featuring Bo Hagon)		Lil Jon	1:21
6.	"Da Blow" (featuring Gangsta Boo)	Christopher Gordon; Smith; Lola Mitchell; Philip Glass; Norris; Wendell Neal	Lil Jon; Young Snipe (co.)	5:59
7.	"Contract" (featuring Trillville, Jazze Pha, and Pimpin' Ken)	Carleton Pierre Love; Donnell Prince; Smith; Jamal Glaze; Lawrence Edwards; Phalon Alexander; Norris	Lil Jon	5:53
8.	"E-40 Choppin' (skit)" (featuring E-40)		Lil Jon	0:41
9.	"White Meat" (featuring 8Ball & MJG)	Love; Smith; Marlon Goodwin; Premro Smith; Norris	Lil Jon	4:47
10.	"Stop Fuckin' wit Me"	Smith; Jeff Hanneman; Kerry King; Rick Rubin; Tom Araya	Rick Rubin	5:58
11.	"Chris Rock Let's Be Friends (skit)" (featuring Chris Rock)	Chris Rock	Lil Jon	0:09
12.	"Lovers & Friends" (featuring Usher and Ludacris)	Christopher Bridges; Smith; Michael Sterling; Usher Raymond	Lil Jon	4:20
13.	"One Night Stand" (featuring Oobie)	Corey Evans; Love; Smith; Larry Linn; LaMarquis Mark Jefferson; Norris; Tenaia Sanders	Lil Jon	4:33
14.	"Aww Skeet Skeet" (featuring DJ Flexx)	Benny Harley; Smith; Keith Clagon; Raymond Brown	DJ Flexx; Scotty Beats (co.)	4:45
15.	"Chris Rock in da Club (skit)" (featuring Chris Rock)	Rock	Lil Jon	0:26
16.	"In da Club" (featuring R. Kelly and Ludacris)	Harley; Smith; Clagon; Brown	Lil Jon	4:29
17.	"Bitches Ain't Shit" (featuring Nate Dogg, Suga Free, Snoop Dogg, and Oobie)	Calvin Broadus; Dejuan Walker; Smith; Nathaniel Hale; Sanders	Lil Jon	4:36
18.	"Chris Rock Get Lower (skit)" (featuring Chris Rock)	Rock	Lil Jon	0:33
19.	"Stick Dat Thang Out (Skeezer)" (featuring Pharrell and Ying Yang Twins)	Chad Hugo; Deongelo Holmes; Eric Jackson; Smith; Pharrell Williams	The Neptunes	3:55
20.	"Grand Finale" (featuring Bun B, Jadakiss, T.I., Nas, and Ice Cube)	Bernard Freeman; Clifford Harris; Love; Smith; Jefferson; Nasir Jones; Jackson; Jason Phillips	Lil Jon	6:48

Notes

- Track 6 contains samples of the remix of "Sippin' & Spinnin' [Remix]", as performed by Gangsta Boo, Playa Fly, and Bun B.
- Track 10 contains samples of "Mandatory Suicide" and "Raining Blood", as performed by Slayer.
- Track 12 contains samples of "Lovers and Friends", as performed by Michael Sterling.
- Track 17 contains samples of "Tonight", as performed by Kleeer; and contains an interpolation of "Saturday Love", as performed by Alexander O'Neal and Cherrelle.
- Early pressings of this album erroneously credited Fat Joe (rather than Jadakiss) as one of the rappers in "The Grand Finale".

=== Bonus remix disc ===
Confirmed by Artist Direct.

Bonus remix disc
No.	Title	Writer(s)	Producer(s)	Length
1.	"Vivica A. Fox (Intro)" (performed by Vivica A. Fox)	V. Fox	Lil Jon	0:19
2.	"What U Gon' Do (Jamaica Remix)" (featuring Elephant Man and Lady Saw)	J. Smith; M. Hall; O. Bryan; S. Norris	Lil Jon	5:48
3.	"What U Gon' Do (Latino Remix)" (featuring Pitbull and Daddy Yankee)	A. Perez; J. Smith; S. Norris	Lil Jon	5:09
4.	"Lean Back (Remix)" (featuring Fat Joe, Mase, and Eminem)	J. Smith; J. Cartagena; M. Betha; M. Mathers; R. Smith; S. Storch	Scott Storch (co.)	5:08
5.	"Let's Go (Remix)" (featuring Trick Daddy and Twista)	C. Young; C.C. Mitchell; J. Smith; M. Young	Lil Jon	3:24
6.	"Ménage à Trois" (featuring Bo Hagon)	Chuck Leonard; J. Lewis; J. Smith	Lil Jon	2:49
7.	"Gasolina (DJ Buddha Remix)" (featuring Daddy Yankee, Pitbull, and N.O.R.E.)	A. Perez; J. Smith; R. Ayala; V. Santiago	DJ Buddha	4:44
8.	"Chris Rock Crunk Rock (skit)" (featuring Chris Rock)	C. Rock	Lil Jon	0:24
9.	"Roll Call (Crunk Rock Remix)" (featuring Ice Cube)	C.P. Love; D. Jenifer; G. Miller; J. Smith; LaMarquis Mark Jefferson; O.B. Jackson; P. Hudson; R. McDowell; S. Norris	Lil Jon	5:10
10.	"Roll Call (Edited) (Bad Brains Band Remix)" (featuring Ice Cube)	D. Jenifer; G. Miller; J. Smith; O.B. Jackson; P. Hudson; R. McDowell; S. Norris	Lil Jon; Bad Brains	5:08

=== DVD ===
Music videos
No.	Title	Length
1.	"What U Gon' Do" (Music video)	4:50
2.	"Roll Call"

Live performances
No.	Title	Live at	Length
2.	"Confessions/Yeah!" (performed by Usher, Lil Jon, and Ludacris)	2004 MTV Video Music Awards	5:52
3.	"Footage video"	2004 MTV Movie Awards
4.	"Hot 97.1 Summer Jam Performance" (performed by Lil Jon and the Eastside Boyz, Pitbull, and Ying Yang Twins includes footage)	2004 Summer Jam

Extra
No.	Title	Length
5.	"BET's How I'm Living" (Interview)
6.	"The Making of Crunk Juice Album"

=== Chopped & Screwed ===
No.	Title	Length
1.	"Crunk Juice Intro"	1:25
2.	"What U Gon' Do (featuring Lil Scrappy)"	6:10
3.	"Get Crunk (featuring Bo Hagan)"	5:44
4.	"White Meat (featuring 8 Ball and MJG)"	5:01
5.	"Da Blow (featuring Gangsta Boo)"	6:11
6.	"Lovers & Friends (featuring Ludacris and Usher)"	5:34
7.	"One Night Stand (featuring Oobie)"	5:45
8.	"E40 Choppin"	0:38
9.	"Contract (featuring Trillville, Jazze Pha, and Pimpin' Ken)"	6:22
10.	"Real Nigga Roll Call (featuring Ice Cube)"	6:18
11.	"Watts (Intro)"	0:14
12.	"Stop Fuckin with Me"	6:32
13.	"Aww Skeet Skeet Intro"	0:52
14.	"Aww Skeet Skeet (featuring DJ Flexx)"	4:52
15.	"Chris Rock "Let's Be Friends""	0:20
16.	"In Da Club (featuring Ludacris and R. Kelly)"	5:34
17.	"Bitches Ain't Shit (featuring Snoop Dogg, Nate Dogg, Suga Free, and Oobie)"	5:16
18.	"Grand Finale (featuring Nas, Bun B, T.I., and Ice Cube)"	7:07
19.	"Lean Back (Remix) (featuring Fat Joe, Mase, and Eminem)"	4:12
Total length:		79:55

== Personnel ==
Adapted from Artist Direct anad AllMusic

- 8Ball – primary artist
- Scotty Beats – mixing, producer
- Big Sam – rapping
- Michael Blackwell – photography
- Warren Bletcher – assistant engineer, mixing assistant
- Bun B – primary artist
- Josh Butler – engineer
- Chris Carmouche – engineer
- Andrew Coleman – engineer
- DJ Flexx – audio production, engineer producer, rapping
- Nate Dogg – primary artist, rapping
- 8Ball and MJG – guest artist, rapping
- Emperor Searcy – executive producer
- Fat Joe – primary artist, rapping
- Gary Fly – assistant engineer, mixing assistant
- John Frye – engineer, mixing
- Gangsta Boo – primary artist, rapping
- Abel Garibaldi – engineer
- Stephen Georgiafandis – engineer
- Bo Hagon – primary artist
- Ice Cube – guest artist, rapping
- Jazze Pha – guest artist, rapping
- LaMarquis Mark Jefferson – bass
- R. Kelly – guest vocals
- L-Roc – Keyboards
- Jason Lader – engineer, mixing
- Bryan Leach – executive producer
- Jonathan Lewis – producer
- Craig Love – guitar
- Lil Bo – rapping
- Lil Scrappy – primary artist, rapping
- Craig Love – guitar
- Ludacris – guest artist rapping
- Rob McDowell – executive producer
- Ian Mereness – engineer
- MHG – primary artist
- Nas – rapping
- The Neptunes – audio production, producer
- Oobie – primary artist
- Vince Phillips – executive producer
- Pimpin' Ken – performer, primary artist
- Rick Rubin – producer
- Andrew Scheps – mixing
- Paolo Sheehy – engineer
- Jonathon "Lil Jon" Smith – executive producer, mixing, producer
- Snoop Dogg – guest artist, rapping
- Scott Storch – keyboards,
- Chris Steinmetz – engineer
- Suga Free – primary artist
- Brian Sumner – engineer
- T.I. – primary artist, rapping
- Trillville – primary artist
- Usher – guest artist, vocals
- Mark Vinten – engineer
- Benjamin Wheelock – design
- Pharrell Williams – guest artist, vocals
- Ying Yang Twins – guest artist, rapping
- Wassim Zreik – engineer
- Danny Zook – sample clearance

== Charts ==
=== Weekly charts ===
Chart (2004–2005)	Peak position
Australian Albums (ARIA)	81
Australian Urban Albums (ARIA)	14
Canadian Albums (Nielsen SoundScan)	14
Canadian R&B Albums (Nielsen SoundScan)	5
French Albums (SNEP)	145
Italian Albums (FIMI)	85
Scottish Albums (OCC)	77
UK Albums (OCC)	52
UK Independent Albums (OCC)	9
UK R&B Albums (OCC)	11
US Billboard 200	3
US Independent Albums (Billboard)	1
US Top R&B/Hip-Hop Albums (Billboard)	2

=== Year-end charts ===
Chart (2005)	Position
US Billboard 200	15
US Top R&B/Hip-Hop Albums (Billboard)	6

== Certifications ==
Region	Certification	Certified units/sales
Canada (Music Canada)	Gold	50,000^{^}
United States (RIAA)	2× Platinum	2,000,000^{^}
^{^} Shipments figures based on certification alone.
