= Michael Sterling (musician) =

- Genres: Funk, electro, soul, R&B
- Years active: 1980–present
- Labels: MSMG; Magnum Records International; New Records; Darkside Entertainment
- Website: http://www.michaelsterling.com/

Michael Sterling (born October 26, 1960) is an American singer and composer from Miami, Florida. His 1990 single 'Lovers and Friends' was a quiet storm classic, having notably been sampled in Usher, Ludacris and Lil Jon and the East Side Boyz 'Lovers and Friends'. Sterling also worked with Miami artists having produced for MC Shy D, engineered for 2 Live Crew and Poison Clan, and was briefly a member of the Reggae group Inner Circle.

== History ==
His musical career started in his teens when he played bass guitar for popular Latino recording artist Ray Fernandez. Soon afterwards, Sterling and two childhood friends formed the group Silver Platinum, who quickly scored a hit on the R&B charts with their single Dance. He then went on to play lead guitar and sing as a member of the Grammy award winning reggae band Inner Circle, well known for their hit Bad Boys.

After touring with Inner Circle, Sterling returned to Miami and began his career as a solo artist. During this time, he started his own record label TSOM Records, where he engineered and produced for local artists 2 Live Crew, MC Shy D, Anquette, Poison Clan and others. He also served as musical director for BMG recording artist Blu Cantrell.

His first album, The Artist, didn't generate much attention. He first struck big time stardom with his second album, No Such Animal, in 1987 produced the songs, 'One More Chance', 'Is It Still Good To Ya' and the timely socially conscious theme song, 'Holiday'. The song, Cheating While She's Wearing My Ring, received a lot of airplay on the video channels (It is not on the album though). His voice is known for its trademark slight sweet and soft falsetto sound.

=== Later years ===
During the 1990s and 2000s, Sterling maintained a low profile, while still releasing albums and producing. He still garners rave reviews and fans worldwide.

In 2005, Usher, Ludacris and Lil Jon and the East Side Boyz covered his song, Lovers and Friends from his 1990 album, Trouble. The song was released on the quadruple platinum album Crunk Juice and was the winner of two BMI Billboard awards including ‘Hip Hop Song of the Year'. In 2006, his song Bedroom Boom was covered by The Ying Yang Twins feat. Avant on the platinum Ying Yang CD U.S.A.

On November 17, 2009, volume 1 of his new two volume album, Eyes Around My Heart was released online.

== Personal life ==
Sterling has received the key to Metropolitan Miami Dade County.

Michael Sterling is married to Rena Sterling.

Children: Talaya Sterling, Solomon Sterling.

== Discography ==
=== Albums ===
Album	Year	Label
The Artist	1986	New/TSOM
No Such Animal	1987	Magnum/New
Trouble	1990	New/TSOM
Love for Your Heart	1991	New/TSOM
Trust	1994	New/TSOM
Right Now	2002	BMG
Eyes Around My Heart	2009	MSMG
Black Songs	2011	MSMG
Love Has No Disguise	2015	MSMG
Beast Mode	2017	MSMG
Made in Miami	2019	MSMG

=== Compilations ===
Album	Year	Label
Special Limited Edition	1991	New/TSOM
The Songwriter	1996	Darkside
All Night and Always	2018	MSMG

=== Singles ===
Year	Single	Album
1983	"Desperate"	The Artist
1984	"Oral"	The Artist
1985	"Nite Club 69"	The Artist
1985	"Anette Please"	The Artist
1986	"You"	The Artist
1987	"Cheating While She's Wearing My Ring"	Non-album single
1987	"No Such Animal"	No Such Animal
1988	"Holiday"	No Such Animal
1988	"Is It Still Good to Ya"	No Such Animal
1990	"One More Chance"	Trouble
1990	"What Do You Do?"	Trouble
1991	"All Night and Always"	Trouble
1991	"Lovers & Friends"	Trouble
1991	"Love for Your Heart"	Love for Your Heart
1992	"If You Still Love Me"	Love for Your Heart
1992	"Beautiful Smile"	Love for Your Heart
1994	"Trust"	Trust
1994	"Falling for You"	Trust
1994	"Back to Blue"	Trust
2007	"Ghost"	Eyes Around My Heart
2007	"Baby, Where's Your Heart"	Eyes Around My Heart
2007	"Girl It's on You"	Eyes Around My Heart
2008	"Holiday"	Eyes Around My Heart
2008	"Falling for You"	Eyes Around My Heart
2009	"I'm Taking You Back"	Eyes Around My Heart
2009	"Begging"	Eyes Around My Heart
2010	"A little Sugar"	Eyes Around My Heart
2010	"Perfect"	Eyes Around My Heart
2010	"Complicated"	Eyes Around My Heart
2011	"Love Theory"	Black Songs
2011	"Show You Love"	Black Songs
2011	"One More Chance 2011" (featuring PM)	Black Songs
2012	"Love Theory"	Black Songs

== Discography with Inner Circle ==
One Way Album	Year1987
Something So Good	1982

== Billboard (Writer/Composer) ==
Artist	Year/Album	Song	Position
Anquette	1988/Respect	I Will Always Be There For You	Peak #76
Usher/Lil Jon/Ludacris	2004/Crunk Juice	Lovers and Friends	Peak #3
