= What U Gon' Do =

Single by Lil Jon & the East Side Boyz featuring Lil Scrappy

from the album Crunk Juice
- B-side: "Real Nigga Roll Call"
- Released: November 2, 2004
- Recorded: 2004
- Genre: Crunk
- Length: 5:20
- Songwriters: Jonathan Smith; Sam Norris; Darryl Richardson
- Producer: Lil Jon

Lil Jon & the East Side Boyz singles chronology
"That's Nasty" (2004)	"What U Gon' Do" (2004)	"Lovers and Friends" (2004)

Lil Scrappy singles chronology
"Knuck If You Buck" (2004)	"What U Gon' Do" (2004)	"I'm a King" (2005)

"What U Gon' Do" is a song by Lil Jon & the East Side Boyz, released in November 2004 as the lead single from their album Crunk Juice and features Lil Scrappy.

The track reached number 22 on the Billboard Hot 100, number 8 on the Hot Rap Tracks chart, and number 13 on the Hot R&B/Hip-Hop Singles & Tracks chart.

Two remixes to the song were an addition to the Crunk Juice bonus remix CD: a Jamaican remix featuring Elephant Man and Lady Saw and a Latino remix featuring Pitbull and Daddy Yankee. The Latino remix became the official remix.

The song appeared in a season one episode of The Andy Milonakis Show when Lil Jon guest starred.

== Charts ==
=== Weekly charts ===
Chart (2004–2005)	Peak position
Germany (GfK)	93
Scotland Singles (OCC) with "Roll call"	69
UK Singles (OCC) with "Roll call"	38
UK Hip Hop/R&B (OCC) with "Roll call"	7
UK Indie (OCC) with "Roll call"	7
US Billboard Hot 100	22
US Hot R&B/Hip-Hop Songs (Billboard)	13
US Hot Rap Songs (Billboard)	8
US Rhythmic Airplay (Billboard)	13

=== Year-end charts ===
Chart (2005)	Position
US Hot R&B/Hip-Hop Songs (Billboard)	60

== Release history ==
Region	Date	Format(s)	Label(s)	Ref.
United States	October 11, 2004	Rhythmic contemporary radio	TVT	
