= UNL =

UNL may refer to:

- Union Nationale Lycéenne, a French secondary student union
- Universal Networking Language, a knowledge representation language used in natural language processing
- University of Nebraska–Lincoln, a university in Lincoln, Nebraska, U.S.
- University of North London, a former university in the United Kingdom
- UEFA Nations League, an international association football competition involving the men's national teams of UEFA's member associations
- Universidad Nacional del Litoral, a university in Santa Fe, Argentina
- Universidade NOVA de Lisboa (NOVA University of Lisbon), a university in Lisbon, Portugal
- Universiteiten van Nederland, a trade group of Dutch universities
- Touhou Hisōtensoku, a Touhou Project video game better known as Unthinkable Natural Law in the English localizations
- Usher's New Look, a youth leadership development organization
- Ústí nad Labem, a city in Czechia, Bohemia
