= Jonnetta Patton =

American entrepreneur (born 1957)

- Born: Jonnetta O'Neal; April 6, 1957 (age 69); Chattanooga, Tennessee, U.S.
- Education: Middle Tennessee State University
- Occupations: Entrepreneur; talent manager; film and television producer
- Children: 2, including Usher
- Website: www.jkitchenculinaryincubator.com

Jonnetta Patton (born April 6, 1957) is an American talent manager, entrepreneur and film and television producer. Based in Atlanta, Georgia, she is the founder of J's Kitchen Culinary Incubator, JPat Management, and Lion Queen Entertainment, a film and television production company.

Born in Chattanooga, Tennessee, Patton raised her sons, Usher Raymond and James "JLack" Lackey, a Grammy-nominated producer and songwriter, as a single parent. She managed Usher for 17 years, becoming his full-time manager when he was 12. In 1999, she and Usher founded New Look, a 501(c) organization that provides guidance and mentoring to students in middle school and college.

In 2016, Patton founded J's Kitchen Culinary Incubator, a 21,000-square-foot facility that provides independent chefs and caterers shared commercial kitchen space and equipment as well as food packaging services and business workshops. In 2019, Patton invested in and partnered with Hungry, an event catering start-up based in Arlington, Virginia. Other investors included Jay-Z and Tom Colicchio. She founded Lion Queen Entertainment in 2023.
