= Lovers and Friends (song) =

2004 single by Lil Jon & the East Side Boyz

Single by Lil Jon & the East Side Boyz featuring Usher and Ludacris

from the album Crunk Juice
- B-side: "What U Gon' Do"; "Roll Call"
- Released: November 9, 2004
- Recorded: September–November 2004
- Studio: Stankonia (Atlanta, Georgia); Circle House (Miami, Florida)
- Genre: R&B
- Length: 4:27
- Label: TVT; BME
- Songwriter: Michael Sterling
- Producer: Lil Jon

Lil Jon & the East Side Boyz singles chronology
"What U Gon' Do" (2004)	"Lovers and Friends" (2004)	"Real Nigga Roll Call" (2004)

Usher singles chronology
"My Boo" (2004)	"Lovers and Friends" (2004)	"Caught Up" (2005)

Ludacris singles chronology
"Get Back" (2004)	"Lovers and Friends" (2004)	"Sugar (Gimme Some)" (2005)

"Lovers and Friends" is a song by American Southern hip-hop group Lil Jon & the East Side Boyz featuring American singer Usher and American rapper Ludacris, from the group's fifth and final studio album, Crunk Juice (2004). The song was written by Michael Tyrone Johnson pka Michael Sterling, while produced by Lil Jon. It was released by BME and TVT Records in November 2004, as the third single from the album. An R&B slow jam, the song consists of a piano melody and hook, and contains a Interpolation of Sterling's song of the same name. The lyrics depict the three artists attempting to seduce women.

"Lovers and Friends" received mixed reviews from music critics; some praised the production, while other reviewers criticized the commercial sound and track placement on Crunk Juice. The song peaked at number three on the US Billboard Hot 100, number 10 on the UK Singles Chart, and at number 15 on the New Zealand Singles Chart. A music video was planned to be released, but never materialized. "Lovers and Friends" was interpolated by DJ Khaled on "Do You Mind" and by Trevor Jackson on "Just Friends", while Pitbull and Prince Royce implemented elements of the song on "Quiero Saber".

== Background and composition ==
Lil Jon conceived the idea of recording "Lovers and Friends" after continuously hearing the original song by American singer Michael Sterling and noticing the positive reaction it received when played in strip clubs. He gave a rough version of "Lovers and Friends" to Usher for his fourth studio album Confessions (2004), but was not included since Usher had finished the album and did not listen to the song. Lil Jon subsequently re-recorded the beat in his Miami recording studio to create a version for inclusion on Crunk Juice. Usher decided to appear on "Lovers and Friends" and recorded his vocals in the studio from September to November 2004, while Lil Jon sent the song to Ludacris. Lil Jon was the final artist to record his vocals. TVT Records had not intended to commercially release "Lovers and Friends" as a single due to legal paperwork complications, such as Sterling's compensation for the song's chart success. DJs began playing the song on the radio in 2004, despite it not having been released as an official single. In a 2004 interview with Billboard, Lil Jon described "Lovers and Friends" as a "classic booty shake record" from the "Keith Sweat era" and revealed he deliberately chose Usher to appear since nobody would expect him to sing the song. An accompanying music video was intended to be released, with Canadian director X expressing interest after having directed the video for the three artists' previous song "Yeah!" (2004). However, it never came to fruition, as none of their record labels could come to terms on a contractual agreement.

Musically, "Lovers and Friends" is an R&B slow jam, which interpolates Sterling's 1990 song of the same name. It contains a soft melodic piano and hook, as Usher croons with a "rap-soul" style and performs a falsetto coo. Ludacris and Lil Jon additionally rap their verses on the song. The former ad-libs during the closing refrain: "Please tell your lovers and friends that Usher, Jon and Luda had to do it again." LaMarquis Jefferson and Craig Love play the guitars, while L-Roc uses the keyboard. Writing for Rolling Stone, Jon Caramanica compared "Lovers and Friends" to the Mary J. Blige song "Everything" (1997), which he considered as a "liquid love song". Rashaun Hall of Billboard wrote that the song is a "grooving ballad". According to Tyson Mccloud of Lancaster New Era, the song's lyrics do not depict women in "an inferior or stereotypical role" in contrast to the other album tracks. James Doolittle of The Morning Call stated that it is "a humorous attempt at being a mack daddy".

== Critical reception ==
USA Today writer Steve Jones described "Lovers and Friends" as "smooth", while Caramanica stated that any R&B artist "would be grateful" to include the song on their album. Soren Baker of Los Angeles Times opined that it lyrically consists of a "little more than boasts and threats", but praised the production's "intense, satisfying feeling". Writing in album reviews for Crunk Juice, music critics were surprised by the placement of "Lovers and Friends" on the track listing. The Augusta Chronicle writer C. Samantha McKevie stated that the song alters the pace of the album and "show[s] a softer side" of Lil Jon. Orisanmi Burton of AllHipHop wrote that it "disrupt[s] the rhythm" and is "contrived", while Heather Kuldell and Craig Seymour of Creative Loafing described "Lovers and Friends" as "something they [would] play at an eighth-grade dance" and noted that a Chris Rock introduction is the "lead-in". Writing for The New York Times, Kelefa Sanneh critiqued that the previous song is a Rick Rubin produced "head-banging, Slayer sampling rant" which segues into "an almost comically light piano ballad".

Some reviewers were more critical. Cyclone Wehner of the Herald Sun negatively compared "Lovers and Friends" to Usher's 2004 B-side ballad "Red Light", expressing a desire for it to be more similar to "Yeah!". The Washington Post writer Andy Battaglia considered the song to be a "chart bait [...] sex ballad" and described Usher's appearance as "listless", while Matt Cibula of Stylus Magazine regarded it to be "blatantly commercial" and similar sounding to Lil Jon's 2004 song "Real Nigga Roll Call". Writing for PopMatters, Lee Henderson stated that the slow jam is "an ode to ass-fucking" and believed that Lil Jon insulted hip hop admirers.

== Commercial performance and legacy ==
"Lovers and Friends" debuted at number 16 on the US Billboard Hot R&B/Hip-Hop Singles & Tracks chart dated November 27, 2004, which was attributed to high airplay despite the lack of a retail release.

The song peaked at number three on the Billboard Hot 100 chart dated January 22, 2005, on which it lasted for 22 weeks. On the UK Singles Chart, "Lovers and Friends" debuted and peaked at number 10 on the issue dated May 14, 2005, and charted for eight weeks. In Australia, the song debuted at its peak of number 36 on the ARIA Singles Chart dated April 3, 2005, and remained on the chart for eight weeks. On the New Zealand Singles Chart, "Lovers and Friends" bowed at number 15 on the chart dated March 28, 2005, and charted for five weeks.

DJ Khaled interpolated "Lovers and Friends" on the 2016 song "Do You Mind", which consequently sampled Sterling's song too. "Do You Mind" featured artists including Nicki Minaj, Chris Brown, Jeremih, Future, August Alsina, and Rick Ross. Alsina incorporated elements of Usher's verse in his part on the song. In October 2018, rapper Pitbull and Dominican bachata singer Prince Royce revised "Lovers and Friends" into "Quiero Saber". American actor and singer Trevor Jackson sampled it on the 2020 song "Just Friends", which was released as the lead single from his debut studio album The Love Language (2021). During a Verzuz webcast against T-Pain in April 2020, Lil Jon played 90 seconds of "Lovers and Friends", with him requesting for the rapper's verse to be played after the song was cut short. A music festival was named Lovers and Friends Festival after the song.

== Track listing ==
Australian maxi single
No.	Title	Length
1.	"Lovers and Friends" (Clean)	4:27
2.	"Lovers and Friends" (Dirty)	4:27
3.	"What U Gon' Do" (Radio)	5:24
4.	"What U Gon' Do" (Jamaica Remix)	5:49
5.	"What U Gon' Do" (Latino Remix)	5:21

European CD single
No.	Title	Length
1.	"Lovers and Friends" (Radio Version)	4:27
2.	"Lovers and Friends" (Jiggy Joint Club Mix)	5:11
3.	"Roll Call" (Radio Version)	4:22
4.	"Roll Call" (Crunk Rock Remix)	5:08
5.	"Roll Call" (Music Video)

== Credits and personnel ==
Credits adapted from the back cover of "Lovers and Friends".

Recording

- Recorded at Stankonia Recordings (Atlanta, Georgia) and Circle House Studios (Miami, Florida)
- Mixed at Stankonia Recordings

Personnel

- Lil Jon – vocals, songwriting, mixing
- Ludacris – featured vocals, songwriting
- Usher – featured vocals, songwriting
- Michael Sterling – songwriting
- LaMarquis Jefferson – bass
- Craig Love – guitar
- L-Roc – keyboards
- John Frye – mixing
- Warren Bletcher – mixing, assistant mixing engineer
- Chris Carmouche – recording
- Mark Vinten – recording
- Gary Fly – recording, assistant recording engineer

== Charts ==
Weekly chart performance for "Lovers and Friends"
Chart (2004–2005)	Peak position
Australia (ARIA)	36
Australian Urban (ARIA)	11
Germany (GfK)	68
Ireland (IRMA) with "Get low"	22
Italy (FIMI)	47
New Zealand (Recorded Music NZ)	15
Scottish Singles Sales (Official Charts) with "Get low"	21
Switzerland (Schweizer Hitparade)	44
UK Singles (Official Charts) with "Get low"	10
UK Hip Hop/R&B (Official Charts) with "Get low"	4
UK Indie (Official Charts) with "Get low"	2
US Billboard Hot 100	3
US Hot R&B/Hip-Hop Songs (Billboard)	2
US Pop Airplay (Billboard)	10
US Rhythmic Airplay (Billboard)	1

=== Year-end charts ===
Year-end chart performance for "Lovers and Friends"
Chart (2005)	Position
US Billboard Hot 100	25

== Certifications ==
Certification for "Lovers and Friends"
Region	Certification	Certified units/sales
New Zealand (RMNZ)	Platinum	30,000^{‡}
^{‡} Sales+streaming figures based on certification alone.
