= Michael Sterling Music Group =

- Founded: 1983 (as TSOM); 1990 (as MSMG)
- Distributor: Independent
- Genre: Various
- Country of origin: United States

Michael Sterling Music Group is a record label, based in Miami, Florida. It is owned by Michael Sterling.

== Artists ==
- Michael Sterling
- Faze
- Mr. Mixx
- Tessie
- Swindle
- Trudy
- Strawberri Taylor
- Supa
- Grace Rico
