= Real Nigga Roll Call =

2004 single by Lil Jon & the East Side Boyz featuring Ice Cube

Single by Lil Jon & the East Side Boyz featuring Ice Cube

from the album Crunk Juice
- Released: December 21, 2004
- Genre: Hip-hop; crunk; gangsta rap
- Length: 5:10
- Label: TVT
- Songwriters: Jonathan Smith; Sam Norris; O'Shea Jackson; Robert McDowell
- Producer: Lil Jon

Lil Jon & the East Side Boyz singles chronology
"Lovers and Friends" (2004)	"Real Nigga Roll Call" (2004)	"Girlfight" (2005)

"Real Nigga Roll Call" (edited version titled as "Real N***a Roll Call" and "Roll Call") is a single by Lil Jon & the East Side Boyz, off their album Crunk Juice featuring Ice Cube. The single would serve as the final single release for the group.

== Record ==
The song once held a Guinness World Record for "most swear words in a song" with 295 expletives.

== Weekly charts ==
Chart (2005)	Peak position
Scotland Singles (OCC) with "What U Gon' Do"	69
UK Singles (OCC) with "What U Gon' Do"	38
UK Hip Hop/R&B (OCC) with "What U Gon' Do"	7
UK Indie (OCC) with "What U Gon' Do"	7

== Release history ==
Region	Date	Format(s)	Label	Ref.
United States	February 7, 2005	Rhythmic contemporary radio	TVT	
United States	February 7, 2005	Urban contemporary radio	TVT	
