= Usher (musician) =

American singer (born 1978)

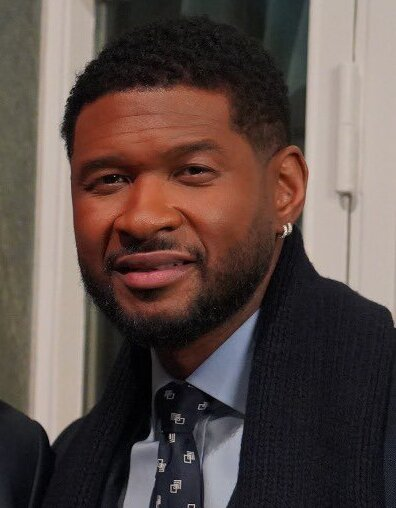
- Usher in 2026
- Born: Usher Raymond IV; October 14, 1978 (age 48); Dallas, Texas, U.S.
- Occupations: Singer; songwriter; dancer; actor; businessman
- Years active: 1991–present
- Organization: Usher's New Look
- Works: Discography; videography
- Spouses: Tameka Foster (m. 2007; div. 2009) Grace Miguel (m. 2015; div. 2018) Jennifer Goicoechea (m. 2024)
- Partner: Rozonda Thomas (2001–2003)
- Children: 4
- Mother: Jonnetta Patton
- Awards: Full list
- Musical career
- Origin: Atlanta, Georgia, US
- Genres: R&B; pop
- Labels: LaFace; Arista; Jive; RCA; Legacy; US; RBMG; Mega; Gamma
- Member of: Ocean's 7
- Formerly of: NuBeginning
- Website: usherworld.com

Logo

Usher Raymond IV (born October 14, 1978) is an American singer, songwriter, dancer, and actor. With over 100 million records sold worldwide, he is one of the best-selling music artists of all time. He was ranked among the greatest singers of all time by Rolling Stone and the greatest pop stars of the 21st century by Billboard.

Usher released his self-titled debut album in 1994, at 15. He rose to fame with the release of his second album, My Way (1997), which spawned his first US Billboard Hot 100 number-one single "Nice & Slow". His third album, 8701 (2001), yielded the US number-one singles, "U Remind Me" and "U Got It Bad". Usher's fourth album, Confessions (2004), is the best-selling album by a Black artist of the 21st century. It was supported by four consecutive US number-one singles: "Yeah!", "Burn", "Confessions Part II", and "My Boo". In 2008, Usher released the album Here I Stand, which marked a commercial step backward, but spawned the US number-one single "Love in This Club". Billboard named him the second-most successful artist of the 2000s and the number-one Hot 100 artist of the decade.

Usher's sixth album, Raymond v. Raymond (2010), contained his ninth number-one single, "OMG", making him one of the few artists to top the Billboard Hot 100 in three consecutive decades. His debut extended play, Versus (2010), produced the top-five single "DJ Got Us Fallin' in Love". Usher's seventh album, Looking 4 Myself (2012) saw further electronic production and spawned the top-ten single "Scream". He followed it with the albums Hard II Love (2016) and Coming Home (2024). His Super Bowl LVIII halftime show in 2024 drew 123 million viewers within the US.

Usher's accolades include 8 Grammy Awards, 12 Soul Train Music Awards, 8 American Music Awards, 18 Billboard Music Awards, 7 BET Awards (including the BET Lifetime Achievement Award) and a star on the Hollywood Walk of Fame. He was inducted into the Black Music & Entertainment Walk of Fame in 2021. In 2008, Usher co-founded the record label Raymond-Braun Media Group (RBMG) with Scooter Braun to manage the career of singer Justin Bieber. Outside of music, he founded the charitable non-profit Usher's New Look in 1999, served as a coach on The Voice (2013–2014), and starred in films such as The Faculty (1998), She's All That (1999), Light It Up (1999), In the Mix (2005) and Hands of Stone (2016).

== Early life ==
Usher Raymond IV was born on October 14, 1978, in Dallas, Texas. His parents are Jonnetta Patton (née O'Neal) and Usher Raymond III. He spent the majority of his childhood in Chattanooga, Tennessee. Usher III left the family when his son was a year old, and reconciled with him shortly before dying in January 2008.

Usher IV has a younger half-brother, James Lackey, from Jonnetta's marriage to Terry Patton, and grew up with the three of them. Directed by his mother, he joined the local church youth choir in Chattanooga when he was nine years old. There, his grandmother discovered his ability to sing, although it was not until Usher joined a singing group that she considered he could sing professionally. Believing that a bigger city would provide greater opportunities for showcasing him, Usher's family moved to Atlanta, Georgia, where there was a more conducive environment for beginning singers. While in Atlanta, he attended North Springs High School.

== Career ==
=== 1991–1996: NuBeginning and Usher ===
At age 12, Usher became one of five members of a local R&B group called NuBeginning, and recorded ten songs with them in 1991. The quintet was organized by local music promoter Darryl Wheeler, and his groupmates were Anthony Byrd, Adrian Johnson, Reginald McKibbon, and Charles Yarbrough. These were included on their self-titled album, which was released during 1993. It spawned a single titled "A Mother's Luv". NuBeginning at first was only made available regionally and by mail order before being re-released nationally in April 2002 as NuBeginning Featuring Usher Raymond IV by Hip-O Records. This ended up being the group's only album. Patton felt her son was better off as a solo artist and pulled him out at age 13, later calling his time with the group "a bad experience". He initially worried this would end his musical dreams and did not yet understand the choice before she stated "your world is only beginning" and planned out future success without the group.

At age 13, Usher met A.J. Alexander at a local talent show in Atlanta. Alexander, who at the time was Bobby Brown's bodyguard, would take Usher around and have him perform in parking lots and talent shows. Alexander invited Bryant Reid, an A&R representative from LaFace Records to see Usher perform on the television talent show Star Search. Following the performance, he arranged an audition for Usher with L.A. Reid, the co-founder of LaFace; Reid signed Usher on the spot to a contract with the record company after Usher sang the Boyz II Men track "End of the Road". Patton left her job as a medical technician to manage Usher. His first solo song, "Call Me a Mack", was recorded for the soundtrack album to the 1993 drama-romance film Poetic Justice.

While preparing for his solo debut album, Usher lost his voice. He was going through puberty and had a difficult time adjusting his vocals. L.A. Reid became skeptical of Usher, put his album on hold and considered dropping him from the label. Usher pleaded with the label to keep him and they did. From this point Reid did not know what to do with Usher so he sent him to New York City in the spring of 1994 to live with record executive Sean Combs to "attend" what Reid called "Flavor Camp". Usher quickly adapted to the lavish lifestyle of Combs although in an interview with Rolling Stone, he described this period as the "hardest days" of his life. "I had to knuckle up, figure shit out in New York" he said.

On August 30, 1994, LaFace released Usher's self-titled debut album behind the co-executive production of Sean Combs. Usher peaked at number twenty-five on the Billboard Top R&B/Hip-Hop Albums chart and was accompanied by three singles: "Can U Get wit It", "Think of You", and "The Many Ways". The album sold over 500,000 copies, by December 2008. It received backlash because he was singing about sex, and him only being 15 years old, the public had a difficult time believing that this was so. LaFace had reservations again about signing Usher because the album was not as successful as they anticipated. At this time Usher's mother took control of his career and put him in more talent shows the summer of 1995, building him a larger fan base and ultimately giving L.A. Reid more confidence in Usher.

After graduating from high school, Usher continued to develop his skills as a stage performer and laid the groundwork for his second album. He also appeared on LaFace's version of "Let's Straighten It Out", a 1995 duet with fellow Atlanta teen recording artist Monica; and on "Dreamin'", from LaFace's 1996 Olympic Games benefit album Rhythm of the Games. He was also featured on "I Swear I'm In Love" off the soundtrack to the 1996 film Kazaam.

=== 1997–2003: My Way and 8701 ===
Usher developed a friendship with American record producer Jermaine Dupri, with whom he co-wrote and produced several tracks for his second album, My Way, released on September 16, 1997. The album's lead single, "You Make Me Wanna...", reached number one in the United Kingdom, becoming Usher's first record to be top single; this resulted in him increasing in popularity. It also became Usher's first gold- and platinum-certified single in the United States. The album's second single, "Nice & Slow", peaked in January 1998 at number one on the Billboard Hot 100, giving Usher his first US number-one single. In February of the same year, the single was certified platinum by the Recording Industry Association of America (RIAA). My Way has been certified seven-time platinum in the United States.

"You Make Me Wanna..." won the Best Male R&B/Soul Single at the 1999 Soul Train Music Awards. In the closing months of 1997, Usher embarked on a series of tour engagements including a spot on Puffy's No Way Out tour, dates with Mary J. Blige, and the opening spot on Janet Jackson's The Velvet Rope Tour. Usher's first concert album, Live, was released in 1999, which featured appearances by Lil' Kim, Jagged Edge, Trey Lorenz, Shanice, Twista and Manuel Seal; the album has been certified gold in the United States.

Usher made his acting debut on the UPN television series Moesha, which resulted in a recurring role on the series and subsequently his first film role in 1998's The Faculty. Usher's extracurricular activities outside of the recording industry gathered momentum over the following year, as he was cast in the soap opera The Bold and the Beautiful. He completed two more films, She's All That, and his first starring role in Light It Up. He also appeared in the Disney TV movie Geppetto.

Usher's third studio album, originally titled All About U, was stated to be released in early 2001. The first single, "Pop Ya Collar", was released in late 2000 and became a number two hit in the UK but underperformed in the United States. The album was subsequently pushed back and retooled after select tracks were later leaked to the radio and Internet. At the same time, LaFace went dormant, moving most of its artists, including Usher, to its parent company, Arista Records. After having revised and renamed to 8701, the album was released on August 7, 2001 (8.7.01). The first two singles "U Remind Me" and "U Got It Bad" each topped the Billboard Hot 100 for four and six weeks, respectively. 8701 has been certified five-time platinum in the United States.

Usher appeared in the 2001 film Texas Rangers. In February 2002, Usher won a Grammy for Best Male R&B Vocal Performance for "U Remind Me". The next year, he won the same award for "U Don't Have to Call", making Usher the only artist aside from Luther Vandross and Stevie Wonder to win this award consecutively. In the summer of 2002, Usher contributed vocals to Combs' "I Need a Girl (Part One)". The year closed out with a trio of TV series appearances, all in November, on The Twilight Zone, 7th Heaven, Moesha, and American Dreams, the latter in which Usher portrayed Marvin Gaye.

=== 2004–2009: Confessions and Here I Stand ===
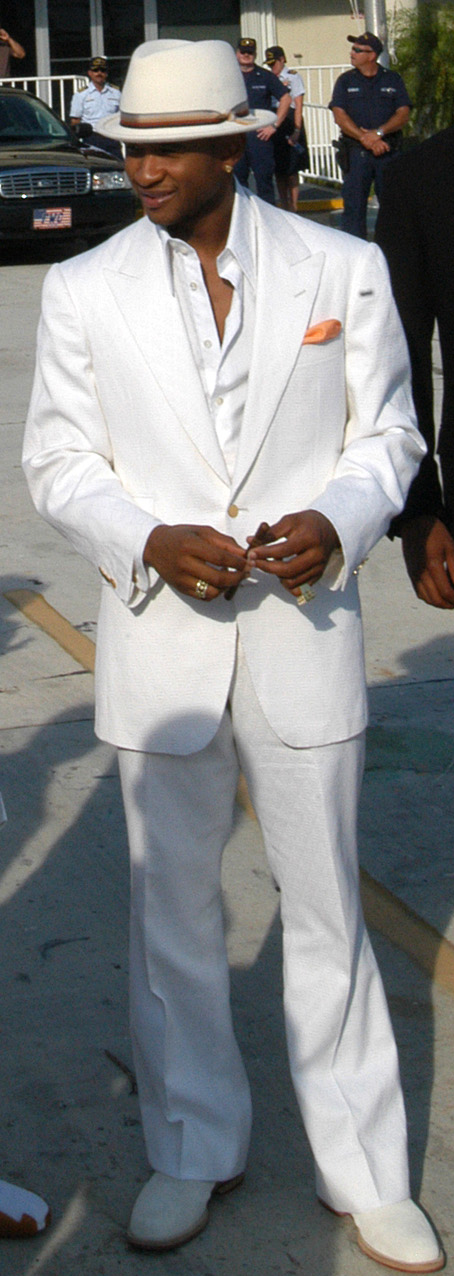
Usher arriving in Miami, Florida, to attend the 2004 MTV Video Music Awards

Usher's fourth studio album, Confessions, was released on March 23, 2004—just as its first single, "Yeah!", was in its sixth week at number one on the Billboard Hot 100 and fifth week on top of the Hot R&B/Hip-Hop Singles Chart. The album's nearly 1.1 million unit debut sales was the highest first-week numbers ever scanned by a male R&B artist and the seventh best of the Nielsen SoundScan history. The album has since sold over 20 million copies worldwide, with over 14 million in the United States, earning the album a Diamond certification from the RIAA.

The album's second and third singles, "Burn" and "Confessions Part II", also topped the Billboard Hot 100, the former for eight weeks. Usher became the first artist to top the Billboard Hot 100 Airplay with four consecutive number-one singles, In September 2004, "My Boo", a duet with American singer-songwriter Alicia Keys, also peaked at number one at the Billboard Hot 100, becoming the album's fourth number-one single. In December, the album's final single "Caught Up" peaked at number eight on the Hot 100. By that time, Arista went inactive and following its parent, Bertelsmann Music Group (BMG)'s merger with Sony Music, his previous label, LaFace, was revived under the Jive/Zomba Group banner, bringing Usher back to the fold.

Confessions earned Usher numerous awards, including four American Music Awards, two MTV Europe Music Awards, two MTV Video Music Awards, and three World Music Awards. At the 47th annual Grammy Awards ceremony in 2005, Usher won three awards, including: R&B Performance by a Duo or Group With Vocals for "My Boo", which he shared with Keys; Rap/Sung Collaboration for "Yeah!"; and Contemporary R&B Album for Confessions. At the 2004 Billboard Music Awards, Usher was recognized Artist of the Year, in addition to receiving 10 other accolades.

Usher supported Confessions with "The Truth Tour". The tour set featured a small stage up on top of the main stage, where the band played with Usher and his supporting dancers left with enough room to perform. The smaller stage had a mini platform attached to it which lowered to the main stage and had two big staircases on both sides of it. To the left, a group of circular staircases climbed to the top, and to the right, there was a fire escape replete with steps and an elevator. Kanye West and Christina Milian were the opening acts for the tour.

Usher at select dates would bring out a special guest, during his Atlanta show taping he brought out his artist at the time Rico Love to rap a verse on the song "Throwback". During a more intimate part of the show, Usher's dancers selected singer Monica from the crowd to be serenaded by Usher while he sang album favorites "Do it to Me" and "Superstar". Usher also performed the "Confessions Part II" remix, where Kanye West would appear from back of the stage. Then lastly Usher would also bring out artist Lil Jon and Ludacris where they would finish the show performing the hit "Yeah". This concert date was filmed to make the official tour DVD of Truth Tour: Behind the Truth "Live from Atlanta". It has been certified by the RIAA selling more than 7 Million copies.

In the spring of 2005, Usher scored a number three Hot 100 hit as a featured vocalist on Lil Jon's "Lovers & Friends". In 2007, Usher also collaborated with R. Kelly on the track "Same Girl", for Kelly's album Double Up. He was also featured in a remix version of Omarion's "Ice Box". Usher also appeared on the track "Shake Down" on American singer-songwriter Mary J. Blige's 2007 album Growing Pains. According to Robert Hilburn of Los Angeles Times, Usher was voted number-one on the executive voting based "Pop's Power List" and described as a "sure-fire property". In November 2005, Usher starred as a disc jockey named Darrell in the Lions Gate film In the Mix.

On August 22, 2006, Usher took over the role of Billy Flynn in the long-running Broadway revival of the musical Chicago. Usher's opening night brought out stars Penélope Cruz, Gabrielle Union, Clive Davis, and Rosie Perez among others. Usher played the role of Flynn for two months but a case of strep throat brought an abrupt ending to Usher's run in Chicago, which saw a spike in ticket sales after he joined the cast. The New York Post reports that Usher's absence cost the production an estimated $400,000 in refunds to disappointed ticket buyers. The producer of Chicago, Barry Weissler, issued a statement sending his "thoughts and best wishes to Usher for a quick and speedy recovery. Usher made a spectacular Broadway debut, bringing a great dedication, work ethic and his amazing talent to the show. We all hope that he might return at some point for the many fans that were unable to see his wonderful performance as Billy Flynn. Usher has found a new home on Broadway and is welcomed back anytime."

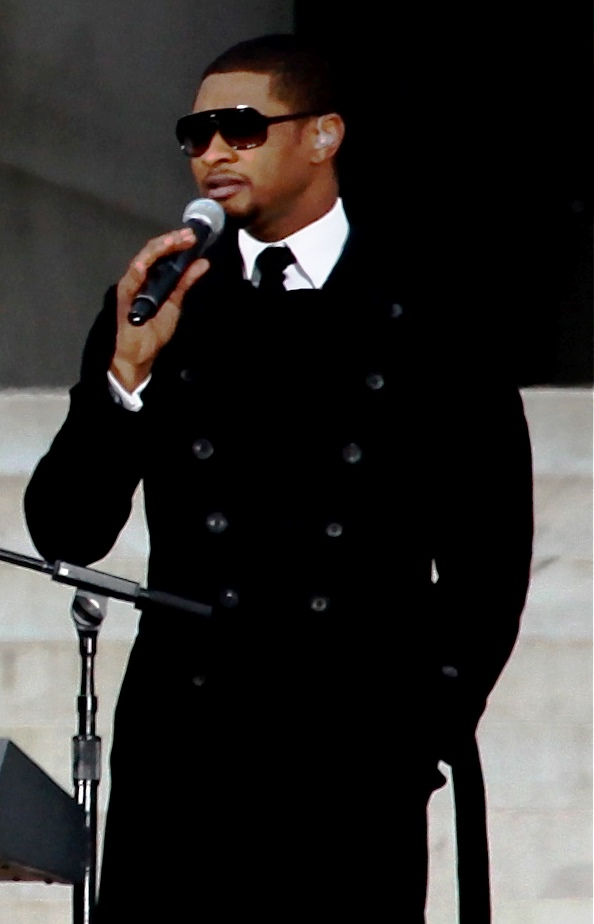
Usher performing at the We Are One: The Obama Inaugural Celebration at the Lincoln Memorial in 2009

Here I Stand was released on May 26 in the United Kingdom and May 27, 2008, in the United States. The album debuted at No. 1 on the Billboard 200 Chart with first-week sales of over 433,000 copies. To date Here I Stand has sold over 1.5 million copies in the United States, received a double platinum certification from the RIAA, and has sold over 5 million copies worldwide. While not approaching the success of his previous album, it received positive reviews from most music critics, who praised the maturity in the album's lyrics. To promote Usher's fifth studio album, the single "Love In This Club" was sent to radio in February 2008 and peaked at number one on the Billboard Hot 100. It went on to spend three consecutive weeks at the top—becoming Usher's eighth number-one single and the fastest-rising song of his career. It also reached No. 1 on the Hot R&B/Hip-Hop Songs chart. The single was another huge international success for Usher. It reached No. 1 on the New Zealand Singles Chart, No. 3 on the Irish Singles Chart, No. 3 on the Eurochart Hot 100, No. 4 on the UK Singles Chart, No. 5 on the Japan Hot 100, No. 5 on the German Singles Chart, No. 5 on the Belgian Singles Chart (Flanders), No. 6 on the Canadian Hot 100, No. 8 on the Swedish Singles Chart, No. 8 on the Australian Singles Chart, No. 9 on the French Singles Chart, No. 9 on the Swiss Singles Chart, No. 10 on the Norwegian Singles Chart, No. 12 on the Austrian Singles Chart, No. 13 on the Belgian Singles Chart (Wallonia), and No. 18 on the Finnish Singles Chart. The follow-up single "Love in This Club Part II", which features American singer Beyoncé and rapper Lil Wayne, peaked at No. 18 on the Billboard Hot 100 and No. 7 on the Hot R&B/Hip-Hop Songs chart. Its third single "Moving Mountains" peaked at No. 18 on the Hot R&B/Hip-Hop Songs chart and reached No. 6 on the New Zealand Singles Chart. The album's fifth single "Trading Places" peaked at No. 4 on the Hot R&B/Hip-Hop Songs chart. In September 2008, Usher announced he would embark on the 15-date tour One Night Stand, in which the audience is only females. On January 18, 2009, Usher performed with Stevie Wonder and Shakira at the We Are One: The Obama Inaugural Celebration at the Lincoln Memorial. He also sang "Gone Too Soon" at the memorial of Michael Jackson on July 7, 2009.

=== 2010–2011: Raymond v. Raymond and Versus ===
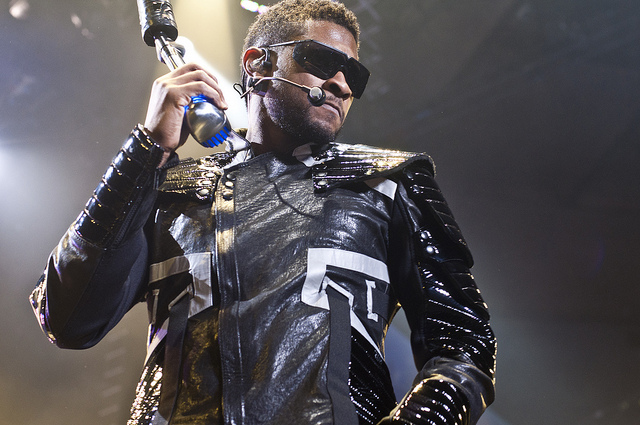
Usher on the OMG Tour in 2010

Raymond v. Raymond was released on March 26, 2010, in Germany, March 30, 2010, in the US, and April 26, 2010, in the UK. The album was expected to follow in Usher's Confessions album's footsteps. Raymond v. Raymond was released only months after Usher's divorce from Tameka Foster. "Papers", a song about divorce, was released as the first single for the album in October 2009. It topped the Hot R&B/Hip-Hop Songs chart for two consecutive weeks, becoming his tenth number one single on that chart. It also peaked at number 31 on the Billboard Hot 100 in the United States. Critics praised the song for its emotion. "Hey Daddy (Daddy's Home)" was released as the second single on December 8, 2009. The single peaked at number 24 on the Billboard Hot 100 chart and number 2 on the Hot R&B/Hip-Hop Songs chart. The song was released as the second international single in July 2010. "Lil Freak" was announced as the album's official second single in the United States. Usher and Nicki Minaj shot the music video for the song on March 9, 2010, in Los Angeles with director TAJ Stansberry. It reached number 8 on the Hot R&B/Hip-Hop Songs chart and number 40 on the Billboard Hot 100. It became Usher's fourth Top 40 hit single from Raymond v. Raymond, when including the buzz single "Papers".

"OMG", which features will.i.am, is the third official US single and the first international single. The song received mixed reviews, complimenting the song's dance and club vibe but criticizing the Auto-Tune effect. It reached number-one in Ireland, New Zealand, the United Kingdom, Australia and the United States. The song became his ninth number one in the United States, making him the first 2010s artist to collect number one singles in three consecutive decades, and only the fourth artist of all-time to achieve the feat. Usher also became the third artist to have at least one number one song from five consecutive studio albums. The song's choreography and dance-heavy accompanying music video has been compared to that of "Yeah!". "There Goes My Baby" was released to airplay as the album's fourth single in the United States on June 15, 2010. The song reached number 25 on the Billboard Hot 100, and number-one on the Hot R&B/Hip-Hop Songs chart, becoming Usher's eleventh number-one hit on that chart. The song ended up tying with "You Make Me Wanna" for fourth longest stay on the chart with 71 weeks. All of the album's singles received very heavy air play. On April 7, 2010, Raymond v. Raymond debuted at number No. 1 on the US Billboard 200 chart, becoming his third consecutive No. 1 album and selling an impressive 329,107 copies in its first week of release, making him the first male artist since Eminem to have three consecutive albums debut at number one on the Billboard 200 chart. One month after being released, the album was certified Gold by the RIAA. On February 9, 2024, the album was certified three-times Platinum by the RIAA.

Raymond v. Raymond also dominated the International Charts, debuting inside the top 10 in Canada, the United Kingdom, Holland, Australia, Germany, Spain, and Italy. Due to the huge international success of Usher's single "OMG" and the good first week sales for Raymond v. Raymond, the album reached number two in Australia and has been certified gold by the Australian Recording Industry Association (ARIA). The album debuted at number four in Canada and has been certified Gold by the Canadian Recording Industry Association (CRIA). Raymond v. Raymond debuted at number-two in the United Kingdom.

Usher announced on July 8, 2010, a follow-up extended play to his sixth studio album Raymond v. Raymond called Versus, and a deluxe edition of Raymond v. Raymond, both to be released on August 24, 2010. Usher described Versus as "the last chapter of Raymond v. Raymond", and that it would explore the subjects of being newly single and a father. The album included 9 tracks, including 7 new tracks, Raymond v. Raymond single "There Goes My Baby", and Justin Bieber single "Somebody to Love (Remix)". The tracks would be included on a deluxe edition of Raymond v. Raymond. The album debuted at number four on the Billboard 200 chart and is preceded by the singles "DJ Got Us Fallin' In Love" (featuring Pitbull), for mainstream audiences, and "Hot Tottie" (featuring Jay-Z), for urban circuits.

Usher performing in 2010

The first single from the album, "DJ Got Us Fallin' In Love", was released to iTunes on July 13, 2010, and sent to radio on July 20, 2010. Due to strong digital sales the song debuted at number nineteen on the Billboard Hot 100. The song became the fourth highest debut on the Billboard Hot 100 of his career, behind 1997's "Nice & Slow" at number nine, 1998's "My Way" at eight, and 2010's "OMG" at number fourteen. Since its release, it has gained international success, peaking in the top 5 in the United States, Australia, and New Zealand. It reached the top 10 in Canada and Europe. It reached number-nine on the Billboard Hot 100 in its third week of release, and became the first time Usher has had two top-ten hits on the Billboard Hot 100 at the same time since his album Confessions. It also became Usher's sixteenth Billboard Hot 100 top-ten hit of his career. The second single, Hot Tottie, reached number nine on the Hot R&B/Hip-Hop Songs chart and number twenty-one on the Billboard Hot 100.

Usher appeared at the 2010 MTV Video Music Awards on September 12, 2010. He then performed at the 2010 American Music Awards on November 21, 2010, and also won the awards for Male Soul/R&B artist and Favorite Soul/R&B album for his album Raymond v. Raymond. According to Rap-Up.com, Usher started working on his next studio album, again teaming up with long-time collaborator Rico Love. The OMG Tour began in November 2010 and ended on June 1, 2011. On February 6, 2011, Usher also made an appearance in the Super Bowl XLV halftime show to sing his song "OMG" with The Black Eyed Peas' singer will.i.am.

On September 8, 2011, Usher appeared on Romeo Santos' second single "Promise" from his debut studio album Formula, Vol. 1. The song was his first number-one on the Billboard Latin Songs chart. A month later, on October 7, Sony Music, which was a parent company to the RCA Music Group, confirmed the consolidation of Usher's previous labels, Jive, and Arista, along with J Records. Following the consolidation of the three labels, Usher (and various other artists previously signed to the three aforementioned labels) were deferred to release planned material for RCA Records.

=== 2012–2014: Looking 4 Myself and The Voice ===
In November 2011, Usher revealed that for his next album he was working on a new type of music which he called "revolutionary pop", which combined different genres to form a new sound. His seventh studio album Looking 4 Myself was released on June 8, 2012, worldwide, and received generally positive reviews from contemporary music critics. American singer-songwriter and record producer Rico Love was interviewed by Billboard magazine, where he spoke about his relationships with artists and experiences. He commented on how Usher wanted to do things differently on the album compared to his previous efforts, saying: "What he wanted to do [on Looking 4 Myself] was explore himself musically. He stepped outside of what was safe and normal. He wanted to make an album that expressed where he was going sonically and not just where he's been for the past 12 to 15 years. He's growing, developing, moving, shaking, and being something that's new, cultural, and that's affecting people sonically. That's kind of forcing the people to grow and elevate". In an interview for MTV News, Usher stated that Looking 4 Myself has "a lot there to keep fans tuning in". When questioned by Reuters during an interview regarding the latter quote, and how this project was different, Usher explained that he felt he was near a "rebirth" and that prior to Looking 4 Myself, he felt restricted and conformed to a specific standard. He said to himself "I gotta go with what I feel and hopefully people will follow me".

"Climax" served as the lead single from his seventh studio album. It impacted Urban radio on February 21, 2012, and was made available for purchase as a digital download on February 22, 2012. It impacted US mainstream radio on March 13, 2012. The second single from Looking 4 Myself was "Scream" and the third single "Lemme See" which features Rick Ross. "Scream" was premiered on April 26, 2012, while "Lemme See" was premiered on May 8, 2012. On Billboard Hot R&B/Hip-Hop Airplay, "Climax" enabled Usher to add a second song of his in the six longest stays at number one for 11 weeks after "You Make Me Wanna..." with 12 weeks.

In 2013, Usher substituted for CeeLo Green as a coach for the fourth season of NBC's The Voice. His last act, Michelle Chamuel, lost the winning title to Danielle Bradbery, mentored by Blake Shelton. He returned for the sixth season and his last act, Josh Kaufman, won.

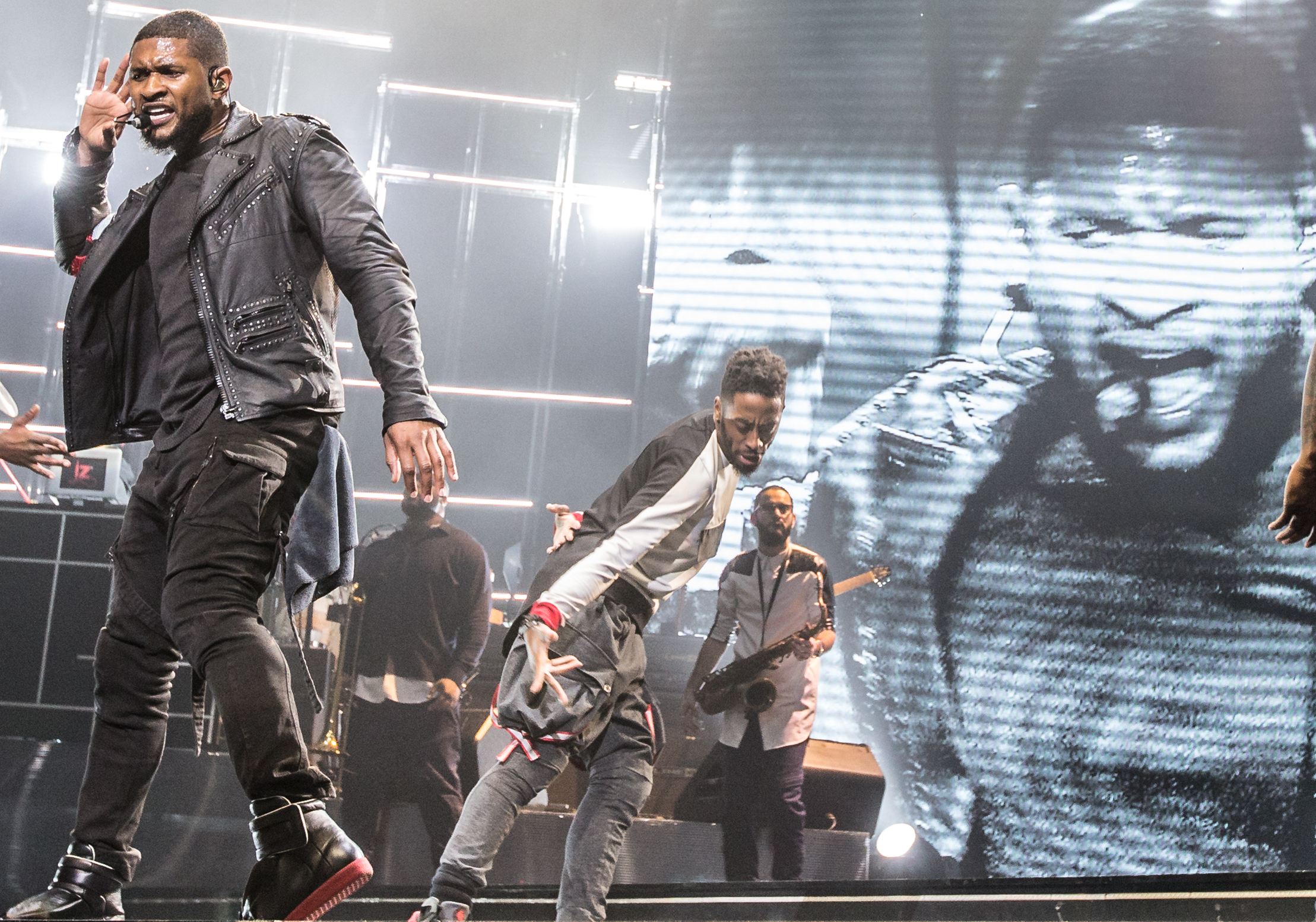
Usher on the URX Tour in 2014

On March 19, 2013, Usher announced that his eighth studio album, titled UR, was in the works. Talking to The Fader, he described the album as "everything you can imagine", saying that it's "gonna be freaking out of here". Singer-songwriter Eric Bellinger told Rap-Up that he, along with Jermaine Dupri, Bryan-Michael Cox, and Brian Alexander Morgan, was working on Usher's next album. Bellinger compared the album's music to Usher's Confessions (2004), saying that it is "more R&B, more urban" than Usher's Looking 4 Myself. The latter declared that his next album would show that he is "still Usher". "Good Kisser", a dance-heavy throwback R&B track, was released as the first single allowing Usher to achieve his 13th no.1 on the Airplay chart, tying Drake for most leaders in the list's history. Produced by Pop & Oak, it was performed at The Voice. Since then, two other singles have been released from the album: "She Came to Give It to You" (featuring Nicki Minaj) and "I Don't Mind" (featuring Juicy J). The latter allowed Usher to lead the Rhythmic charts with the most number ones (13).

On August 25, 2014, Usher announced his UR Experience Tour in support of his then-titled eighth studio album UR. The UR Experience started in Montreal, Quebec on November 1 and ended in Tampa, Florida on December 14. The 27 city North American leg was supported by opening acts DJ Cassidy and R&B newcomer August Alsina. The European leg of the tour visited 23 cities and the support would be Nico & Vinz. "With The UR Experience, I want to give my fans an ever-changing live show full of surprises and special guests," Usher says, via a press release. "I am really excited to be with my fans and give them an Usher experience like they've never seen or heard before." While on tour, with the collaboration of Honey Nut Cheerios, he released "Clueless", a new song that could be downloaded free using a code from specially-marked Honey Nut Cheerios boxes bought from Walmart.

=== 2015–2017: Hard II Love and Hands of Stone ===
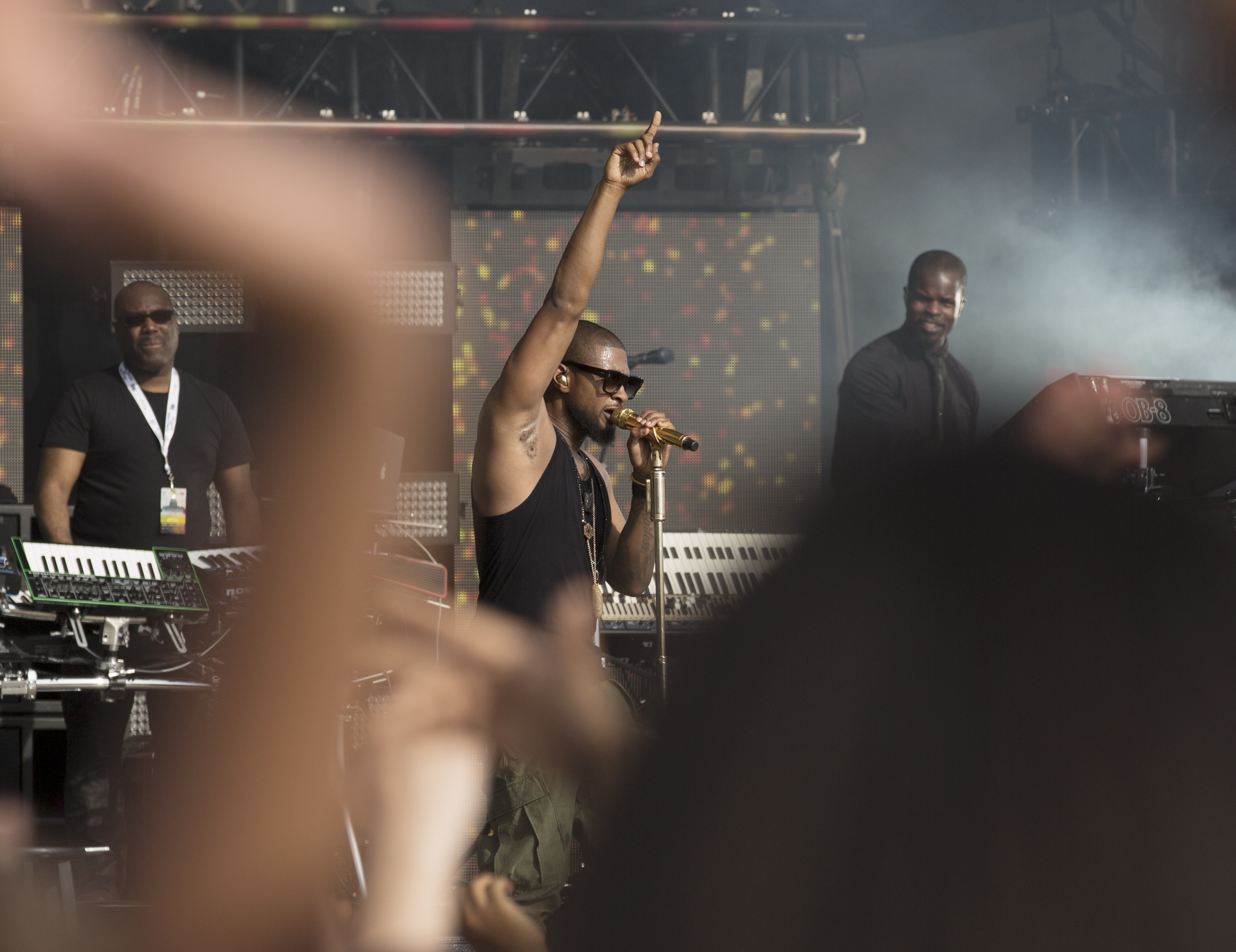
Usher at the 2015 Global Citizen Festival

On October 16, 2015, Usher released an interactive music video exclusively on the music streaming platform Tidal called "Chains" (featuring Nas and Bibi Bourelly). "Chains" literally forces the viewer to confront the issue of racial profiling and police brutality head-on: By utilizing the webcam on the viewer's computer as well as facial recognition technology, "Chains" paused mid-song whenever the viewer's eyes deviate from the video. Usher performed the song for the first time at the Tidal X:1020 concert on October 20, 2015, at Brooklyn's Barclays Arena. On January 14, 2016, after continual delays of his eighth album, Usher announced via Daniel Arsham Instagram post that he changed the title of the album from UR to Flawed. It was scheduled to be released in April 2016, but has been pushed back with no release date. On February 29, 2016, Yuna released "Crush" as the first single from her forthcoming album Chapters featuring Usher. On June 9, 2016, Usher released a new single from his expected forthcoming album Flawed on the music streaming platform Tidal titled "No Limit" (featuring Young Thug), along with a second single titled "Crash" on June 10 for all digital platforms.

On June 12, 2016, it was reported that Raymond signed a management deal with business partner Scooter Braun. Braun already represented Justin Bieber and had a joint venture with Raymond and Bieber. This report was confirmed by Usher during a sit down interview with Ryan Seacrest at the 73rd annual Cannes Festival on June 21, 2016. Usher furthered his acting career, starring as American former professional boxer Sugar Ray Leonard in the 2016 American-Panamanian biographical sports film Hands of Stone about the career of Panamanian former professional boxer Roberto Durán. In it, he starred opposite of Édgar Ramírez, Robert De Niro, and Ruben Blades. On August 26, 2016, Hands of Stone premiered worldwide. "Missin U" was also released as a third single by RCA Records for online streaming and digital download, along with "Champions (from the Motion Picture Hands of Stone)", both on Vevo. On August 30, "Rivals" (featuring Future) was released and debuted exclusively on Tidal with its accompanying video. It was released on Vevo on September 2, 2016. On September 13, 2016, both "Missin U" and "Rivals" were sent to radio as the album's third and fourth singles.

The album Hard II Love was released on September 16, 2016, and received generally positive reviews from music critics. It debuted at number 5 on the US Billboard 200, and sold 28,000 copies in the United States in its first week. It also became his seventh consecutive top ten album in the United States. The lead single, "No Limit" initially was serviced to Urban radio on June 9, and eventually peaked at number 1 on the Mainstream R&B/Hip-Hop airplay chart, number 32 on the Billboard Hot 100, and number 9 on the Hot R&B/Hip-Hop Songs. On December 16, 2016, Chris Brown released "Party" as the second single from his album Heartbreak on a Full Moon featuring Usher and Gucci Mane.

=== 2018–2020: A and return to The Voice ===
On October 12, 2018, Usher released a collaborative studio album, titled simply A. The official tracklist contains 8 songs with features from Future and Gunna. The album was produced entirely by Zaytoven, who previously collaborated on Usher's Raymond v. Raymond album as a co-producer for the single "Papers". Between November 9–17, 2018, Usher served as the headliner for the RNB Fridays Live concert series. The six date stadium tour in Australia and New Zealand sold over 150,000 tickets On November 14, 2018, Billboard reported that Usher signed a worldwide management deal with Luke Mitzman and 100 Management. It was also reported he is working on a follow up album that will be released in 2019. On December 2, 2018, Usher performed at the Global Citizen Festival: Mandela 100 in Johannesburg, South Africa, celebrating the legacy of Nelson Mandela. Usher and DJ Black Coffee performed a mash-up featuring the South African Indigenous Dance Academy (IDA).

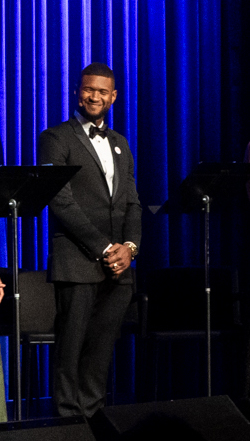
Usher at the Kennedy Center in 2019

Usher had a cameo in the crime film Hustlers, which was released on September 13, 2019, and stars Jennifer Lopez, Constance Wu, Keke Palmer, Cardi B, and Lili Reinhart. In September 2019, director Lorene Scafaria told Vulture magazine his cameo was written into the script in 2016, before the film went into development. Usher is featured on the film's soundtrack, with his single "Love in This Club". In March 2019, Usher posted a photo of himself in the studio next to a whiteboard with the title "Confessions 2" and a blurred out tracklisting. The following day producer Jermaine Dupri, who produced the original Confessions went live on Instagram and previewed new music. On June 15, 2019, Usher, alongside Erykah Badu, headlined the second annual Smoking Grooves Festival at the Queen Mary Events Park in Long Beach, California.

On September 6, 2019, Usher returned for season seventeen of NBC's The Voice. He joined John Legend team as this season's battle advisor. On September 10, 2019, DJ Black Coffee released his single "LaLaLa" with Usher from his forthcoming album. It reached number one on the South Africa airplay charts. Usher appeared on Summer Walker's debut album Over It, which was released on October 4, 2019. They collaborated on "Come Thru", which samples his song "You Make Me Wanna..." Critics from Time, Complex, and Paper all named it one of the best songs of the week.

On December 13, 2019, Usher released the lead single, "Don't Waste My Time" (featuring Ella Mai) for his upcoming ninth studio album. It was co-produced by longtime collaborators Bryan-Michael Cox and Jermaine Dupri. Usher, Ella Mai, and Jermaine Dupri performed the song on BET's Saving Our Selves, to benefit African American communities impacted by the COVID-19 pandemic on April 22, 2020. It topped the Adult R&B Chart, becoming his fifth number one single on that chart.

Usher performed at the 62nd Annual Grammy Awards on January 26, 2020. Usher and Sheila E. performed a special tribute honoring Prince. This performance was teaser for the Let's Go Crazy: The Grammy Salute to Prince concert at the Staples Center scheduled for January 28, 2020 on CBS featuring performances from Alicia Keys, John Legend, Chris Martin, H.E.R., and more. On January 31, to initiate a tribute for Kobe Bryant, who was killed five days earlier in a helicopter crash alongside his 13-year-old daughter Gianna and seven others, Usher performed "Amazing Grace" at the Staples Center prior a game between the Los Angeles Lakers and Portland Trail Blazers, in what was the Lakers' first game played since the tragedy. Usher had been set to host and perform at the 2020 iHeartRadio Music Awards, which had been set scheduled to broadcast live on Fox on March 29. The event was postponed due to concerns over the spread of COVID-19.

Usher served as executive producer and judge on a dance competition series called The Sauce. The seven-episode series premiered on April 6, 2020, on the streaming service Quibi. On April 10, 2020, Usher released a single, "SexBeat", with former collaborators Lil Jon and Ludacris. It was co-written by Jermaine Dupri and Antoine Harris. The release of "SexBeat" came days after Lil Jon premiered the track on April 5 during an online music battle called Verzuz hosted by Swizz Beatz and Timbaland. He appeared on NBC's Songland and released the song "California" (featuring Tyga) on June 15, 2020. On June 26, 2020, Usher released "I Cry".

=== 2021–present: Residencies, Coming Home, and Super Bowl LVIII halftime show ===
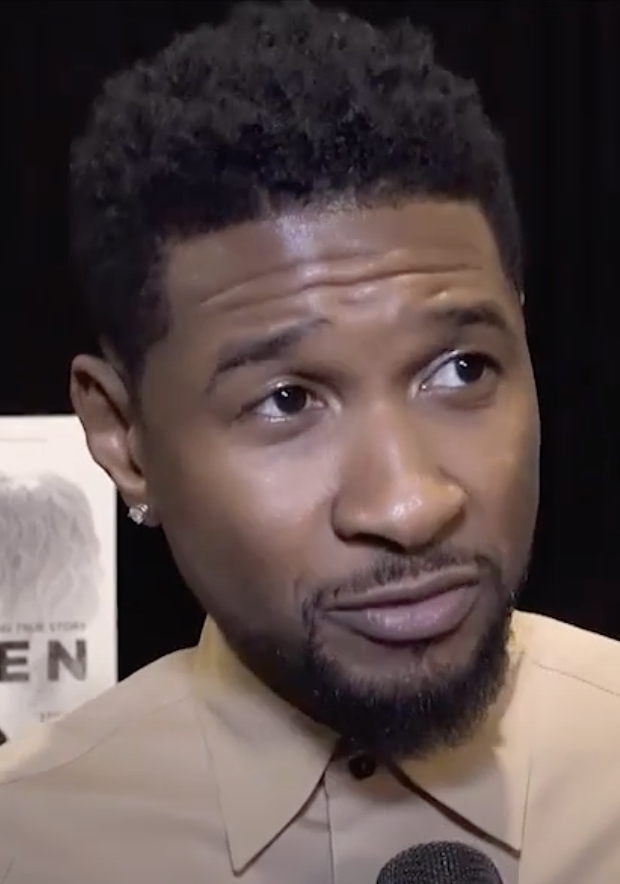
Usher in 2020

On September 4, 2020, Usher announced he would be headlining a 12 show residency at the Colosseum at Caesars' Palace in Las Vegas, Nevada. The show was scheduled to start on July 16, 2021, and slated to run until January 1, 2022. Live Nation Las Vegas and Caesars Entertainment will be donating $1 from every ticket purchased to Usher's New Look foundation. In December 2021, Bruno Mars announced onstage with Usher that he was moving his residency at Dolby Live at Park MGM. On February 17, 2022, Usher officially announced that he would be moving his residency from Caesars Palace to Park MGM and would be headlining 23 shows. Usher released the single "Bad Habits" on September 10, 2020, as the second single off his forthcoming studio album. A music video directed by Chris Robinson accompanied the song. It topped the Adult R&B Chart, becoming his sixth number one single on that chart.

On March 8, 2022, it was announced that Usher had parted ways with RCA Records after ten years and five months with the imprint following the RCA and Sony Music Group merger. He later signed a joint venture with Larry Jackson's Gamma music company. Usher and his longtime partner, L.A. Reid, founded Mega in partnership with Gamma. Usher's eighth studio album will be released through this partnership. On June 30, 2022, Usher performed on NPR's Tiny Desk Concerts series. He was joined by vocalists Eric Bellinger and Vedo, bassist, Dmitry Gorodetsky, trombonist Lemar Guillary, trumpeter Brandyn Phillips, saxophonist Jay Flat, keyboardist Darek Cobbs, guitarist Erick Walls and drummer Ryan Carr. A clip from the performance of Usher whispering "watch this" went viral as an internet meme. On March 17, 2023, Usher released the single "Glu", his first solo single in over two years. It was co-produced by longtime collaborators Lil Jon, The Avila Brothers, and Sean Garrett. It topped the Adult R&B Chart, becoming his seventh number one single on that chart. On April 14, 2023, Usher announced his 8-night show residency in Boulogne-Billancourt, titled "Rendez-Vous À Paris" at La Seine Musicale presented by Live Nation Entertainment. The residency starts on September 24 and runs through to October 5. On August 4, 2023, Usher released the single "Good Good" with Summer Walker and 21 Savage as the lead single to his upcoming ninth studio album. It topped the R&B/Hip-Hop Airplay chart, becoming his 16th number one on that chart. It also topped the Mainstream R&B/Hip-Hop airplay chart, becoming his seventeenth number one single on that chart. He followed it up with a second single, "Boyfriend", released several weeks later. On September 14, 2023, he appeared on J Balvin's single "Dientes". The song reached number-one on the Latin Airplay chart.

On September 24, 2023, Usher announced that he would headline the Super Bowl LVIII halftime show, held at the Allegiant Stadium in Las Vegas, Nevada. He described the opportunity as "an honor of a lifetime" that he would finally be able to check off his bucket list. In addition, he announced in an Apple Music interview with Zane Lowe that his ninth studio album, Coming Home, would be released on February 11, 2024, the same day it was reported that he would perform at the Super Bowl. The album debuted at number two on the US Billboard 200. The album's second single, "Ruin" (featuring Pheelz), was released on February 2, 2024, along with its accompanying music video. It was directed by Dave Meyers and shot on an iPhone 15 Pro. On February 6, Usher announced the Usher: Past Present Future 24-stop tour, which will visit North America and Europe. Due to overwhelming demand, it expanded from 24 to 58 shows. On June 30, 2024, Usher was honored with the Lifetime Achievement Award at the 24th BET Awards for his notable contributions to the music industry. In October 2024, Usher was named the 11th "Greatest Pop Star of the 21st Century" by Billboard. In September 2025, Usher appeared on Season 11, Episode 7 of The Late Show with Stephen Colbert, where he discussed his Past Present Future tour and musical legacy.

== Artistry ==
=== Musical style and influences ===
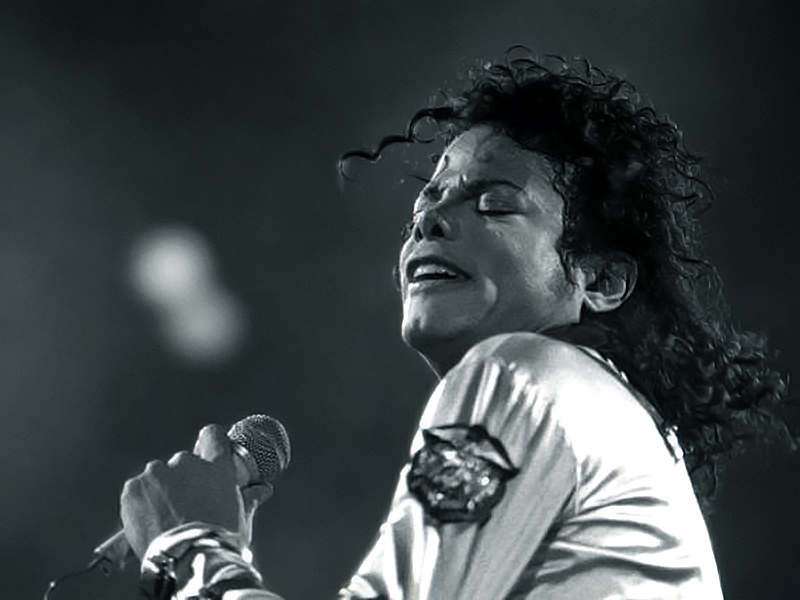
Usher has cited Michael Jackson (pictured in 1988) as his primary musical inspiration.

Usher's music is generally R&B, but also incorporates pop among other genres. Elias Leight of Rolling Stone wrote that "catching pop's waves has always been one of Usher's greatest strengths, whether that means collaborating with Lil Jon when crunk was going mainstream or charging into EDM". Complex stated that Usher provided some of "the best of pop music in R&B". His narratives have an autobiographical nature of emphasis on lifestyle, relationships and love, resembling "an R&B Casanova". Usher was new jack swing oriented, while My Way contained influences of soul. 8701 "introduces touches of '80s rock guitar and the minimal rhythm of '80s hip-hop" displaying versatility, according to NME's Lucy O'Brien. Confessions is viewed as a "top-of-the-line pop-soul showcase", with established critic Robert Hilburn of Los Angeles Times seeing lead single "Yeah!" as something Michael Jackson would have created "if he still had the old Thriller magic". Here I Stand was noted as more ballad-heavy by critics, where the title track's usage of jazz notably drew comparisons to Stevie Wonder. Raymond v. Raymond was described as a "skillful fusion of R&B/hip-hop/pop" by Billboard. Looking 4 Myself further explored progressive R&B, hip-hop ballads, and synth pop, with its overall sound coined "hybrid pop" for its dynamic incorporation of EDM, dubstep, neo soul, and funk. Hard II Love sees Rolling Stone's Maura Johnston view it to "stretch the boundaries of R&B while winding toward the brooding atmospherics that have enveloped much of pop over the past 12 months".

On many occasions, Usher has named Michael Jackson as his biggest influence. Usher once told MTV, "He influenced me in so many ways, more than just music ... as a humanitarian, as a philanthropist, as an artist, as an individual who transcended culture. I wouldn't be who I am today without Michael Jackson". During the television special 'Michael Jackson: 30th Anniversary Special', Usher was able to dance with Jackson while performing "You Rock My World". Prince being another main influence, Usher said "every album I'd always do like one song that is very Prince-influenced, because he's a great influence on me musically, especially just kind of being expansive and creating music that represents many different genres." In Time magazine's "100 Most Influential People" issue, he explained "I was interested in music and trying to find a model. It was Michael, or it was Prince. He had an attitude, a rawness that Michael didn't have. He was not urban, but he was our version of what cool could be." Other musical influences are Marvin Gaye, Stevie Wonder, Luther Vandross, Janet Jackson, Maze featuring Frankie Beverly, Al Green, and Boyz II Men.

The boy band New Edition and its solo member Bobby Brown were childhood influences. Usher told ABC News, "I can remember as a kid attending a New Edition Concert", and called it "one of the greatest moments in my performance history" years later when he was invited on stage with the group to perform "N.E. Heartbreak" at a concert in Washington, D.C. On Bobby Brown, Usher told CNN, "the first record that I ever bought was Bobby Brown's Don't Be Cruel", and that he admired him "Just for being an edgy artist, being a true representative of R&B and rhythmic music". Usher's Live album would feature a medley performance of Brown's original singles - "Don't Be Cruel", "Every Little Step", "Rock Wit'cha", and "Roni". Usher was inspired by Frank Sinatra's My Way album released in 1969 so much that he decided to name his second album My Way. Prince would inspire "Nice & Slow" while giving him his first number-one single on the Hot 100 chart. Usher's third album 8701 would be inspired by love and heartache, containing influences from Donny Hathaway, Stevie Wonder, Marvin Gaye and Michael Jackson. His fourth album was inspired by the rap group Bone Thugs-n-Harmony, and Eminem whom he credited for the album having a transparent reputation. Usher said in an interview with Sway Calloway, "The honesty of hip-hop, and what Eminem was saying in his records, it motivated me. Like, yo if he could be that honest, you know through hip-hop - and there've been other stories, storytellers, but never quite as vivid as his...and I got that Cleveland, because, you know with the Bone Thugs-n-Harmony, you know what I'm saying, is to just understanding that the rhythm and the flip of it to make it be able to make it be at least, you know, hip-hop appropriate."

=== Vocal style ===
Usher possesses a leggiero tenor vocal range of 3 octaves and 4 notes, and is considered to be "one of the most soothing in R&B". At the age of 13, he set the record for the longest note ever held by a child on Star Search, with 12 seconds. Usher's vocal coach since My Way, Jan Smith, cites him as "the single most gifted singer I've ever worked with in 26 years". On the dynamic 8701, Rolling Stone's Kathryn McGuire describes his vocals as "velvety" and "impressively adaptable" as it won him his first two Grammys as Best Male R&B Vocal Performance. With Confessions, Sasha Frere-Jones of The New Yorker generally noted him as "long on control and short on texture". He received another Grammy Award nomination in 2006 through a cover of Luther Vandross's "Superstar" he performed on The Oprah Winfrey Show in 2005. Here I Stand displayed his vocals as "agile" and "balletic", as well as his ability to "easily drift from wavering tenor to fine-tuned falsetto" that create emotions of urgency and burning according to Clover Hope of The Village Voice. On his One Night Stand: Ladies Only Tour in 2008, Lee Hildebrand of San Francisco Chronicle assessed "Usher's chest tones have a ringing, Gaye-like quality, and his high head tones suggest Prince's falsetto, but his frequent use of syllable-splitting curlicues owes much to Wonder. Usher is a stronger, more assured singer than he was a decade ago, though the melismas in his lower range sometimes meander off pitch. His falsetto tonality is more on target."

Looking 4 Myself exemplified his vocal craft earning him positive acclaim as Gawker's Rick Juzwiak states "his vocal range is even more impressive than his emotional one" with emphasis on his falsetto being "something that sounds as natural as a speaking voice ... he's the picture of grace against shrieking synths ... His emotional range is vast enough to sell tenderness, lechery and wistfulness within minutes of each other". On "Climax", his performance lauded as "blistering" by Maura Johnston, and "hair-raising" by Jody Rosen, as he won Best R&B Performance in 2013. "There Goes My Baby" and "Dive" are also commended as showcase standouts of his "superior R&B vocal range" by Consequence of Sound's Ryan Hadfield, and MadameNoire's Brande Victorian. For Hard II Love, Jon Pareles of The New York Times commented "a genuinely expressive voice that encompasses an ardent croon, a melting falsetto and quick, singsong declamation". On the 2023 Rolling Stone's list of the 200 Greatest Singers of all time, Usher ranked at number 97.

=== Performance ===
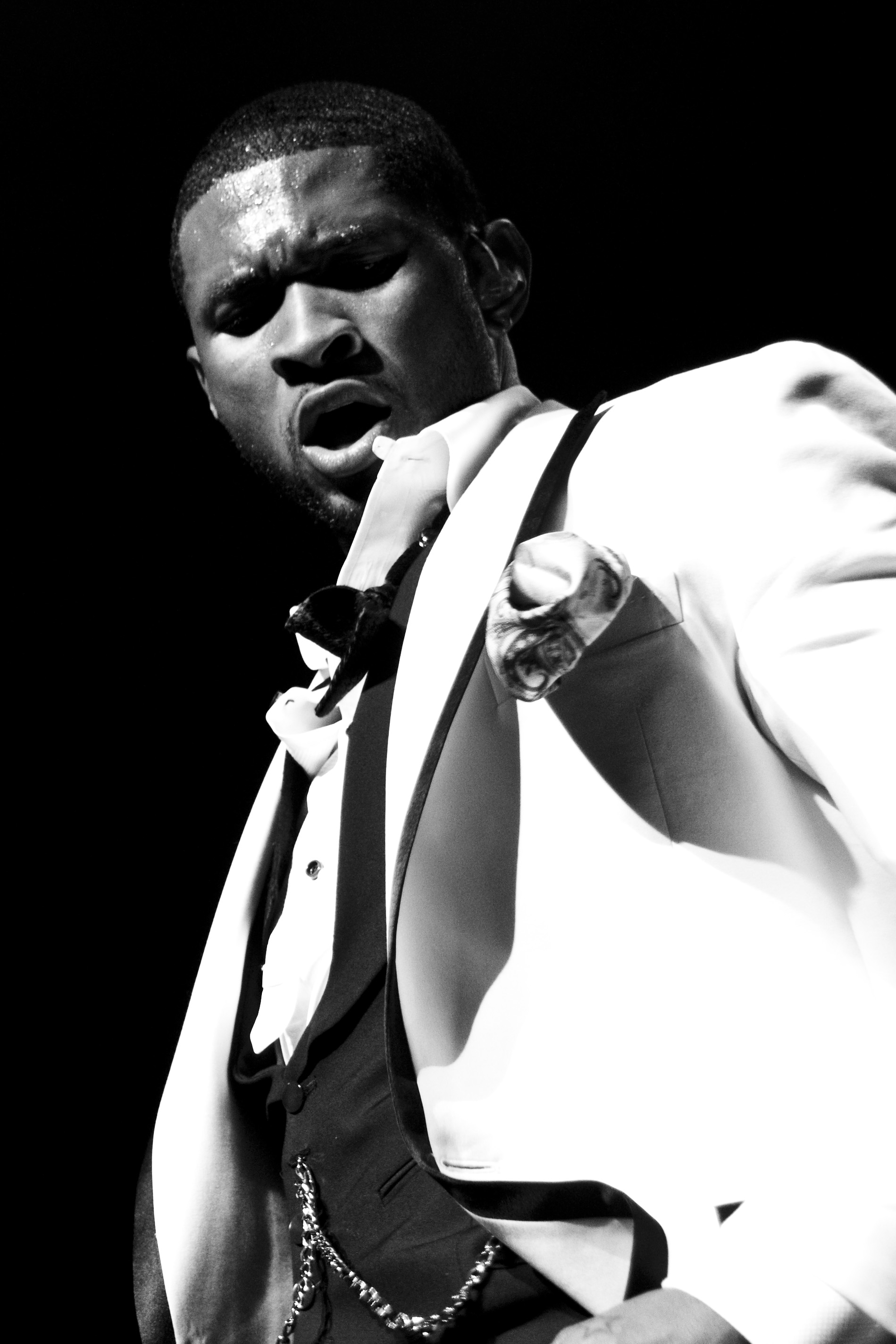
Usher on his 2008 One Night Stand: Ladies Only Tour, at the Warfield Theatre

Usher's stage performances have been complimented by critics as "packed with high-octane choreography held together by sleek, masterful showmanship", and his presence "engaging enough to pull off a one-man show". Vibe magazine notes him as being Bobby Brown-esque for his displays of "brash sexuality and arrogance", leading to antics such as being "prone to dropping his pants", and a "tendency to shed his shirt on stage", while John Aizlewood of The Guardian observed that "For all his pelvic thrusting and crotch-grabbing, Usher is a rather courtly presence." Bob Purvis of Milwaukee Journal Sentinel further noticed that Usher grabbing his crotch "would become a familiar sight throughout his shows, along with simulated sex with his dancers and his mic stand". On his 8701 Evolution Tour in 2002, Larry Nager of The Cincinnati Enquirer hailed his simultaneous ability, stating "the 23-year-old Atlantan proved you can sing and dance at the same time. Of course, that's how James Brown, Jackie Wilson and Usher's most obvious role model Michael Jackson did it, but in today's high-tech, gimmicky concerts, it's a lost art", claiming his show "ended the reign of 'Nsync, Britney and the rest of the lip-synching, teen-pop acts". Usher told People magazine "James Brown introduced me to soul. Because of him I was given a clear view of what a real performance is and should be. I learned showmanship from him", and has seen comparisons to his influences. At the 2004 MTV Video Music Awards, he performed "Confessions Part II" and "Yeah!" under a rain machine, in which he eventually threw the mic stand at a mirror during the former. Rolling Stone placed it at number 13 of their "20 Best MTV VMAs Opening Performances".

Usher is an old-school showman who has been performing since childhood: a dancer, a singer, five feet and seven inches of raw charm and taut musculature. I've seen superstars perform before, but always in large venues, where they are isolated from the plebes by an appropriate distance. Seeing Usher in such a small venue, beaming ear-to-ear the whole evening, I was bowled over by the sheer amount of raw talent and charisma on display.

— Anna Silman of New York Magazine

Chad Batka for The New York Times said "He has established himself as one of R&B's supreme performers and craftsmen, following through on what he learned from Michael Jackson in particular: songs that alternate between choppy and smooth, vocals punctuated by exultant high whoops, a dance vocabulary." Capable of playing the piano, he also began to adopt playing on other instruments such as the drums and bass guitar, amid singles "Good Kisser" and "She Came to Give It to You" in 2014. The UR Experience Tour consisted of a nine-piece band and three backing vocalists according to Billboard, as The Guardian called him "a masterful all-rounder who surrounds himself with talent on stage". Maura Johnston of Rolling Stone labels him the "Award Show King", explaining "His dedication to choreography dates back to the days when Janet Jackson made videos that looked like they were shot in one take. He's an entertainer that would have been stunning at any point in the last 60 years of television."

== Public image ==
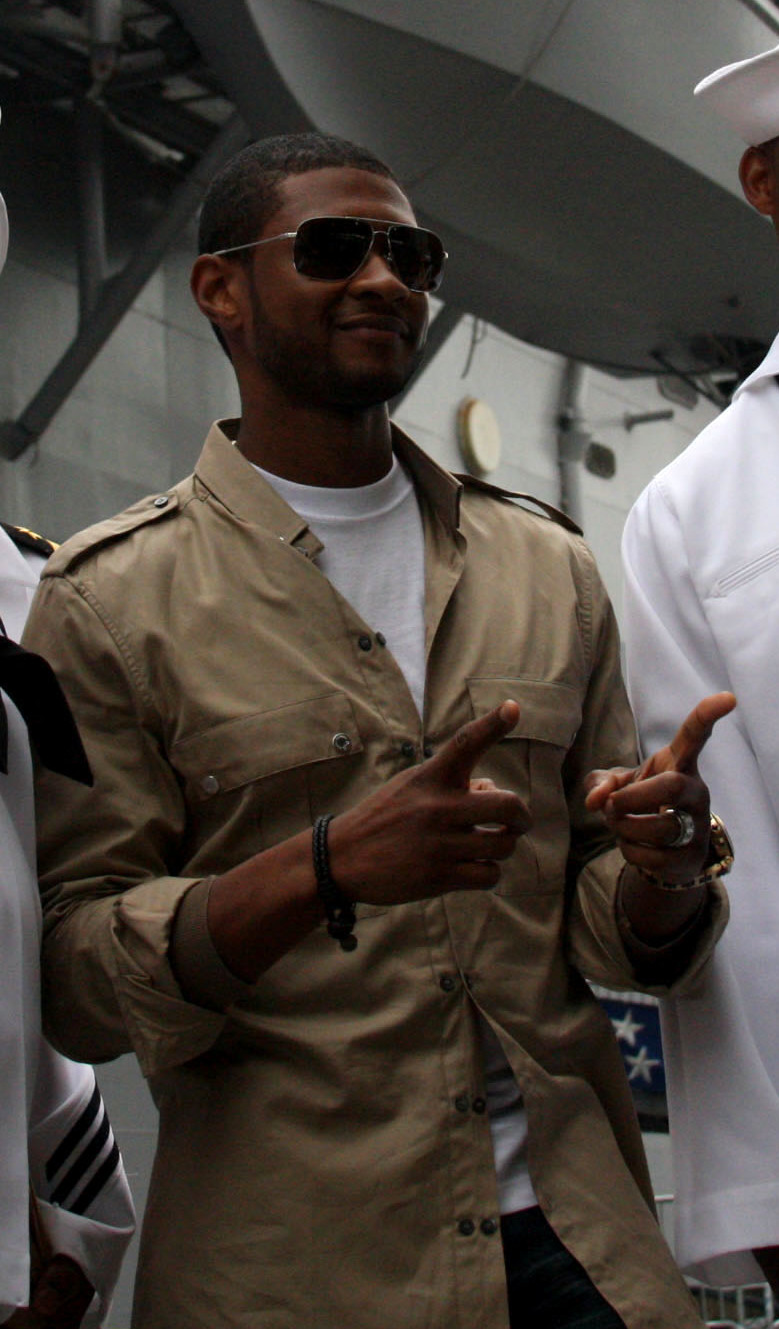
Usher aboard the USS Kearsarge in 2008

Usher has been regarded as "an international sex symbol" since a young age, predominantly for his stage persona. Fusion states "Usher—one of the greatest R&B sex symbols in the past 20 years, paving the way for Chris Brown, Trey Songz and Justin Bieber—used sex as a major part of his image", while VH1 considers him to be "the sexiest male performer ever to walk a stage". People magazine named Usher the "Sexiest R&B Star" in 1998, with singer Monica who said on stage sexiness was manifest in "his movements, his gestures, the way he expresses his lyrics". They included him in their 2004 "Sexiest Men Alive", and 2008 "Sexiest Man Alive" lists. The New York Times writer Kelefa Sanneh referred to him as "one of the country's most famous ex-boyfriends" after his breakup with Chilli of TLC. He was ranked number-one on BET's "All Shades of Fine: 25 Hottest Men of the Past 25 Years" special in 2005. Madame Tussauds New York also unveiled a wax figure of Usher during a competition to launch The Usher Interactive Experience, and for the opening of a VIP room in 2007. Rolling Stone magazine ranks "Confessions Part II" amongst its "30 Sexiest Music Videos of All Time".

After his marriage to Tameka Foster, his sexual appeal was expected to mature as The New Yorker writer Sasha Frere-Jones wrote "The challenge here is to convince us that he is a married and responsible man—grown and sexy, [...]—without sacrificing the louche, frictionless sense of play that made him famous." VH1 have listed Usher at number 9 of its 100 Sexiest Artists List. According to Glamour magazine, he was one of the "Sexiest Men" of 2010, and 2011. In 2012, Billboard reviewed his fashion evolution stating "The singer came onto the scene in the '90s rocking baggy jeans and suits that made us question his celebrity status, but over the years this R&B star has developed his own signature look, rendering him a modern day fashion icon". In 2013, Complex placed him in its "Most Stylish R&B Singers of the 90s" list. Men's Health magazine was covered by Usher on its 25th anniversary issue, with Lou Schuler calling him "the man with the best abs in the entertainment industry". In 2014 and 2015, his Calvin Klein Collection suits saw him listed as "Best Dressed Men" by outlets at the Golden Globe Awards and Grammy Awards. InStyle have rated him both in their "Hottest Celebrity Abs" collection, and "37 of the Most Stylish Dads" list.

== Legacy ==
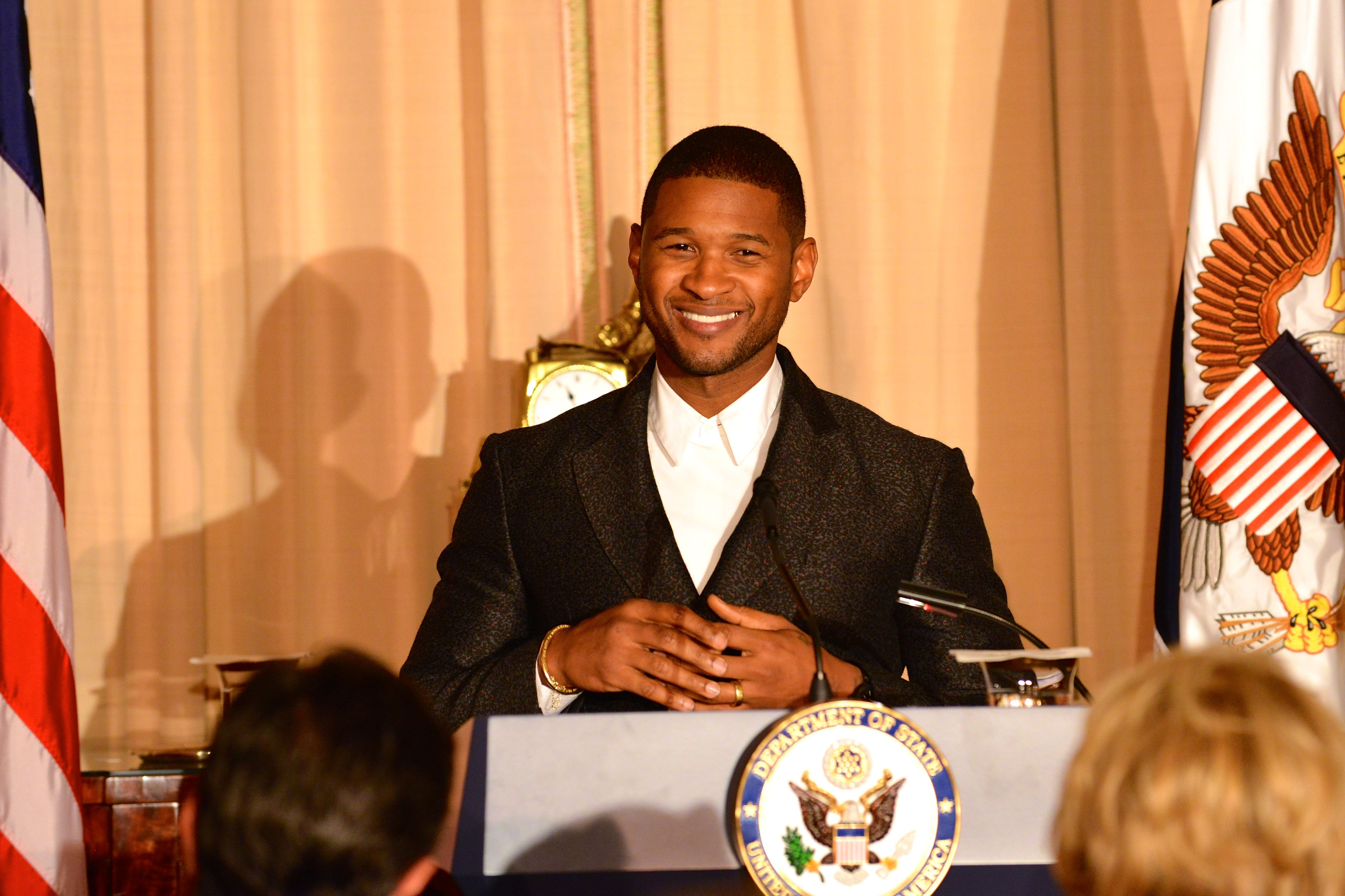
Usher at the 2015 Kennedy Center Honors

Usher was named the Hot 100 Artist of the 2000s by Billboard stating "Usher's sexy brand of R&B dominated the last decade with the top-selling album and more No. 1s than any other act", with Confessions selling 20 million copies worldwide as the top solo album. Considered by Bonsu Thompson of Vibe to be "the Thriller of our generation", Kia Turner of Rolling Stone stated that it "became ingrained in pop culture" because of its theme. Pop music critic Sasha Frere-Jones of The New Yorker remarks that "For a while, Confessions was pop music" and says it "may turn out to have been the last true blockbuster in pop". Clay Cane said in 2008 "We didn't see pop-R&B artists on pop radio, and Usher is one of those people in the 90s who was the catalyst for that; he was kind of the pioneer ... He's the greatest example of pure crossover success". Described as the best dancer in pop since Michael Jackson by writers of VH1 and The Guardian, Jody Rosen said in 2012 "He's the biggest male pop singer in the world; sometimes, it seems like he's the only one, in a marketplace still dominated by divas". Attaining 9 Billboard Hot 100 number-one singles to tie with the Bee Gees, Elton John, and Paul McCartney, Justin Charity of Complex referred to him as "the greatest male pop singer of the past couple decades" in 2015.

James Brown, performed a duet with Usher in 2005 at the 47th Grammy Awards in which he honorably dubbed him the Godson of Soul. Brown reiterated "The new godson; Usher, the new godson" following the performance. Often cited as an "icon", Los Angeles Times critic Randall Roberts marks dance singles "Yeah!", "Caught Up" and "OMG" to have influenced contemporary dance-pop, stating the former two also "helped define the [20]00s". Time magazine's pop stardom ranking metric, ranked Usher 3rd in history, based on "all-time chart performance and contemporary significance". Rolling Stone magazine named "Confessions Part II" the greatest R&B song of the 21st century and "U Don't Have to Call" the 25th.

Usher has been referred to as the "King of R&B", as well as "Mr. Entertainment" by The Washington Times and Chicago Tribune. The BET Honors honored him for his contributions to music with a Musical Arts award in 2015, presented by Bobby Brown who said "You remain a game changer, for your discipline, for your perfectionism. You're just a god man". The BET Honors highlighted his influence on many contemporary artists such as Chris Brown, Trey Songz, Drake, Justin Bieber, Jason Derulo, Miguel, Omarion, Ray J, August Alsina, and Eric Bellinger. Ne-Yo further cited Usher as an influence upon the honor saying "I feel that without Usher, there would be no me, there would be no Chris Brown, there would be no Trey Songz. He paved the way for us". Other artists who have also cited him as an influence are Zayn Malik and Liam Payne of One Direction, Bryson Tiller, Jungkook of BTS, Lucky Daye, 6lack, Rico Love, Jeremih, Anderson Paak, Trevor Jackson, Sam Hunt, Leon Bridges, Sammie, B. Smyth, Jacob Latimore, Kevin Woo, Keke Palmer, Justine Skye, BJ The Chicago Kid, Roy Woods, YK Osiris, Lukas Magyar of Veil of Maya, Bruno Mars, and actor Tahj Mowry.

== Achievements ==
Usher has received numerous awards throughout his career from having the 14× platinum Diamond certified album Confessions, four multi-platinum albums in My Way, 8701, Raymond v. Raymond and Here I Stand and one platinum album in Looking 4 Myself, collectively selling over 33 million albums in the US and 53 million albums worldwide. This includes 8 Grammy Awards, 18 Billboard Music Awards, 12 Soul Train Music Awards and 8 American Music Awards. In 2004, Usher became the top Billboard honoree by taking 11 awards. At the 26th annual American Society of Composers, Authors and Publishers (ASCAP) Rhythm & Soul Music Awards in 2013, he was honored with the Golden Note Award. Yahoo Music classed him as the best R&B act of the decade behind Michael Jackson on album sales, while Fuse ranked him as the 10th most award-winning musician of all time. He has sold over a total of 100 million records. Usher was inducted into the 29th Annual Georgia Music Hall of Fame in 2007, and the Hollywood Walk of Fame in 2016 with a star located at 6201 Hollywood Boulevard. On June 17, 2021, Usher was inducted into the Black Music & Entertainment Walk of Fame as a member of the inaugural class. His songs "Love in This Club" and "OMG" are also amongst the best-selling digital singles worldwide.

Usher amassed nine number-one and eighteen top-ten singles on the Billboard Hot 100, and accumulated 47 weeks at the top, more than any other male solo artist at the time. He spent 28 weeks at number-one in 2004 alone, marking a then-record for most cumulative weeks spent atop in a calendar year on the Hot 100 of all time. "OMG" made him the first 2010s artist to collect number-one singles in three consecutive decades (1990s, 2000s, 2010s). He became the fifth artist of all-time to achieve that feat, following Stevie Wonder, Michael Jackson, Janet Jackson, and Madonna, and became the third male soloist in history to have at least one number-one single from five consecutive studio albums. On the Hot R&B/Hip-Hop Songs chart, Usher has 13 number-one singles tied with Michael Jackson and Marvin Gaye, the most of the 2000s with 8 number-ones, and set a chart Guinness World Record in 2010. Usher also has 14 number-one singles on the Rhythmic chart, 17 number-one singles on the Mainstream R&B/Hip-Hop Songs chart, and 16 number-one singles on the Airplay chart, with "You Make Me Wanna..." (12 weeks) and "Climax" (11 weeks) as two of the longest stays on the latter. Usher has topped several Billboard Year-End charts including seven in 1998, seventeen in 2004, and one in 2010. The Year-End Hot 100 chart of 2004 was topped by "Yeah!" while "Burn" held second place, making him the first act since The Beatles in 1964 to have two singles occupy the top two positions. On the 2000s Billboard Decade-End chart, "Yeah!" finished second, behind Mariah Carey's "We Belong Together".

Billboard's 2nd most successful artist of the 2000s, he was placed at number 6 on their list of "Top 50 R&B/Hip-Hop Artists of the Past 25 Years". The same magazine placed him at number 14 on their "Greatest of All Time Hot 100 Artists" list, 6 on their "Top 60 Male Artists of All-Time" list, and 31 on their "35 Greatest R&B Artists of All Time" list. Confessions is placed at number 16 on their "Greatest of All Time 200 Albums" list, and 10 on Vibe magazine's "Greatest 50 Albums since '93". "Yeah!" is placed at number 14 in their "Greatest of All Time Hot 100 Songs" list, and 15 on VH1's "Greatest Songs of the 2000s".

== Business and other ventures ==
=== Music ===
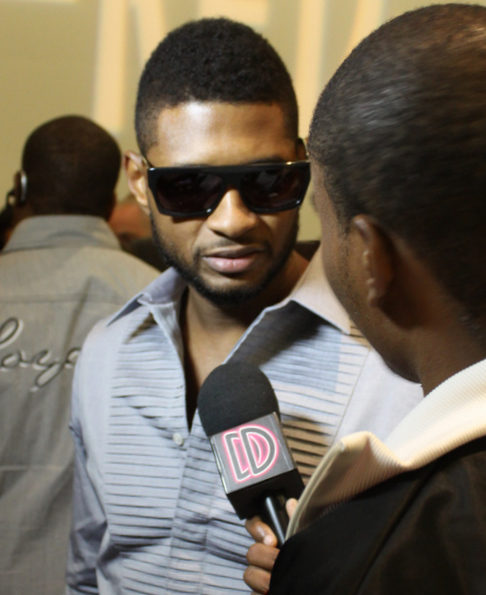
Usher at Rico Love's Division 1 launch in 2010

Usher founded vanity record label US Records in 2002. The label was a subsidiary of Clive Davis's J Records, which was distributed by Sony BMG. The only album released by US Records was the soundtrack to In the Mix in late 2005, which was used to introduce the label's acts, such as rapper Rico Love, singer Rayan, Canadian teen R&B artist Justin Bieber, and One Chance, an R&B vocal quartet composed of Jon A. Gordon, Michael A. Gordon, Courtney Vantrease, and Robert Brent. Usher served as songwriter-producer in the project. The Raymond Braun Media Group, which Justin Bieber is signed up to, is a joint venture between Usher and Bieber's manager Scooter Braun. In 2023, Usher and longtime friend L.A. Reid co-founded Mega, an independent record label in a partnership with Larry Jackson's digital music distribution company, Gamma.

Usher served as the contestant mentor for the Top 10 Week of Season 9 of the television show American Idol. He appeared on the ITV1 show Britain's Got Talent on June 5, 2010. Usher joined as a new coach on the NBC American reality talent show The Voice, alongside Adam Levine, Blake Shelton, and Shakira in season 4, which premiered on March 25, 2013. Usher reached the finale with contestant Michelle Chamuel on June 13, 2013. Usher returned with Shakira in season 6 of The Voice, which premiered on February 24, 2014. Usher reached the finale again, and won with contestant Josh Kaufman on May 20, 2014.

=== Acting ===
Usher made his television acting debut on the American sitcom Moesha in 1997 playing Jeremy Davis, the love interest and classmate of Moesha, played by Brandy Norwood. He has acted in feature films, debuting in 1998's The Faculty. In 1999, Usher appeared as a student disc jockey in the teen romantic comedy film She's All That. The same year he starred in his first leading role in the movie Light It Up with Rosario Dawson, Vanessa L. Williams, and Forest Whitaker. The following year, he played in Gepetto and Texas Rangers. He starred in the 2002 Twilight Zone revival episode To Protect and Serve as a police officer. Usher continued to make appearances in various television shows, including the period drama American Dreams (2002) in the role of Marvin Gaye. He also appeared in Sabrina the Teenage Witch in Season 2, episode 6 playing the role of a love doctor. In 2005, he starred in the crime-comedy film In The Mix with Chazz Palminteri and Kevin Hart. He has also acted on stage, making his debut on Broadway in 2006 in Chicago as lawyer Billy Flynn and joining the cast of the Off-Broadway play Fuerzabruta in 2012; the former performance was critiqued by theater critic Ben Brantley as unfitting for the character played stating "Usher was "cast so hard against type, you would think you would hear him cracking from the collision", despite commending his vocal and choreographic performance in the show. In 2013, he began filming his role as boxer Sugar Ray Leonard for the 2016 American biographical film Hands of Stone, which follows the life of Panamanian boxer Roberto Durán. In the film he stars alongside Édgar Ramírez, Robert De Niro, Ellen Barkin, and Ana de Armas. The film debuted at the Cannes Film Festival in Cannes, France on May 16, 2016, and was released in the United States on August 26, 2016.

=== Products and services ===
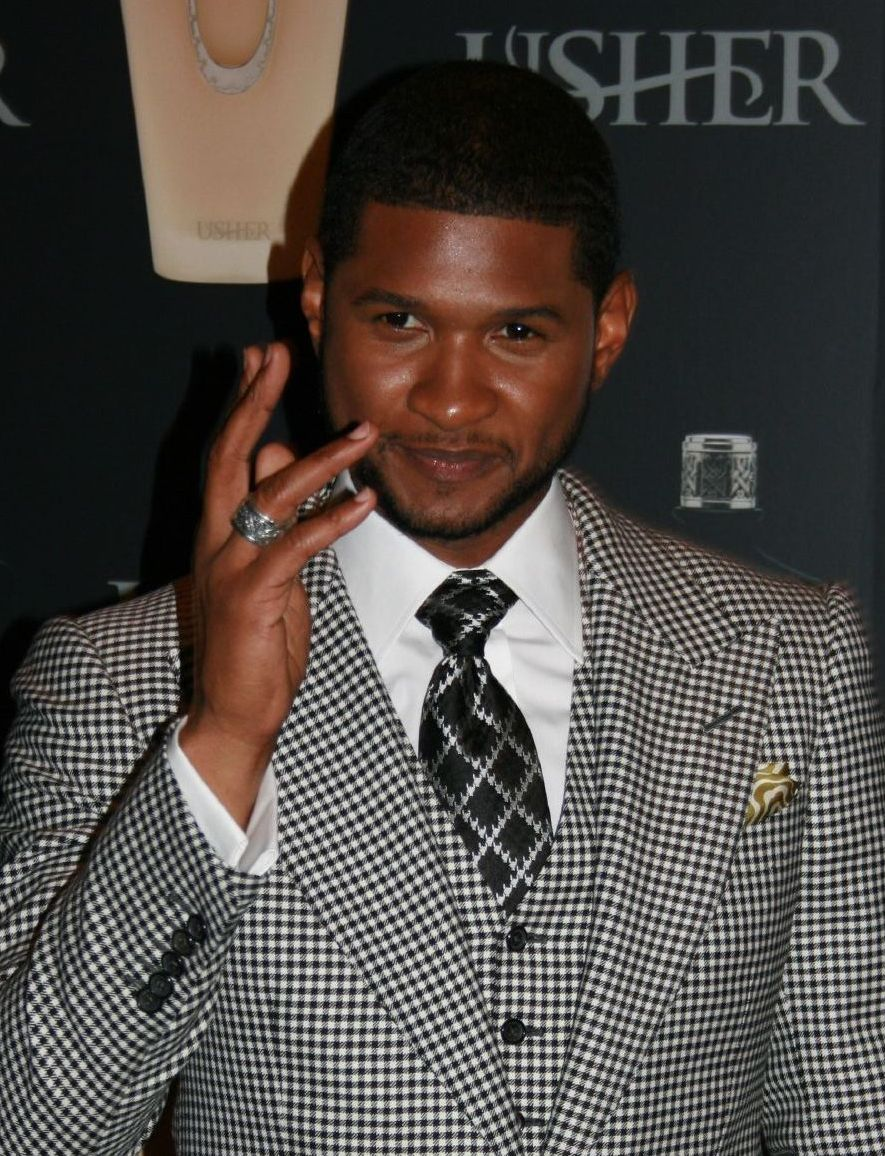
Usher at his 2007 launch of fragrances Usher He and Usher She

Aside from recording music, Usher is involved in other businesses, including several restaurants. In 2007, Usher worked with Richard Herpin and Honoring Blanc for the fragrances Usher He and Usher She. The promotion of the fragrance featured Usher and Martha Stewart in the Macy's "The Magic of Macy's" commercial. In September 2008, Usher released the fragrances UR for Men and UR for Women. Usher's fifth fragrance, VIP, was launched in 2009.

On March 30, 2015, it was announced that Usher is a co-owner, with various other music artists, in the music streaming service Tidal. The service specializes in lossless audio and high definition music video with curated editorial. Jay Z acquired the parent company of Tidal, Aspiro, in the first quarter of 2015. The slogan "Turn the tide" and the hashtag "#TIDALforAll" was used by various artists on social media during the buildup to the press conference relaunching the service. Usher, along with sixteen artist stakeholders (such as Alicia Keys, Kanye West, Beyoncé, Rihanna, Madonna, J.Cole, Nicki Minaj, and more) co-own Tidal, with the majority owning a 3% equity stake. The idea of having an all artist owned streaming service was created by those involved to adapt to the increased demand for streaming within the current music industry, and to rival other streaming services such as Spotify, which have been criticized for their low payout of royalties. Jay-Z stated "The challenge is to get everyone to respect music again, to recognize its value".

On June 28, 2015, Usher became partners with Yoobi the fast-growing school supplies company called based out of Los Angeles. The company donates a portion of its products to schools and has brought in over $20 million in revenue between June 2014 and June 2015, Yoobi CEO Ido Leffler told Inc. The Usher line of supplies with Yoobi features a collaboration with Jonni Cheatwood, the artist who does the designing. The slogan is "Mixing street smarts with school smarts". The collection is available online and at Target Corporation stores nationwide, and for every purchase, school supplies are donated to kids in need in US classrooms. When asked why he partnered with Yoobi, Usher said, "Preparing future leaders through my New Look Foundation has always been about having the proper tools to succeed in life. If they don't have the tools, young men and women from underserved communities can't even begin to understand the idea of having a new or different perspective. So that's where this collaboration came together giving young people the tools and supplying them with hope."

=== Investments ===
Usher is a part owner of the Cleveland Cavaliers professional basketball team. He is part of a group which bought the team with a reported total purchase price of $375 million in 2005. He became the third pop artist to own a large stake in an National Basketball Association (NBA) team. During his tenure, the Cleveland Cavaliers have won five Central Division Championships, three Eastern Conference Champions and the 2016 NBA championship on June 19, 2016, which he won as a minority owner.

On March 6, 2017, it was announced that Universal Music Group, Evolution Media, Jon Jashni, Usher, Steve Stoute, Charles King, and others invested $6 Million in Mass Appeal. Mass Appeal is a New York City based media and content company. In 1996, Mass Appeal was founded as a graffiti print magazine. In 2014, Mass Appeal relaunched after CEO Peter Bittenbender partnered with American rapper Nas, who would serve as the publication's associate publisher.

On April 2, 2019, Usher, Jay-Z, Walter Robb, Seth Goldman, Ndamukong Suh, and others invested $8 Million in a catering startup called Hungry. Hungry is a service that connects local chefs with companies looking for business and event catering. The catering company partnered with J's Kitchen Culinary Incubator, a business owned by Usher's mother Jonetta Patton.

On July 23, 2019, it was announced Usher, Kevin Hart, Justin Bieber, Demi Lovato, DJ Khaled, Scooter Braun, and Kendall Jenner among others collectively invested $5 Million in Liquid I.V., a health-science and nutrition wellness company based out of El Segundo, California. The company was founded in 2012 by Brandin Cohen to help children in developing countries suffering from extreme dehydration caused by deadly diseases.

=== Endorsements ===
Usher has worked with MasterCard since 2004. Together, they launched the Usher Debit MasterCard, a sleek black card that features Usher's face and was handed out to concertgoers during his The Truth Tour. In 2009, he partnered with Belvedere Vodka, launching the campaign Product (Red) that went to donate half of all profits from a new special-edition bottle to fight HIV/AIDS in Africa. MasterCard again teamed up with Usher in 2015 to surprise one cardholder. Usher was disguised as a street performer to surprise one of his biggest British fans, who was flown into Los Angeles as part of MasterCard's Priceless Surprises campaign in support of the 2015 BRIT Awards.

In 2012, Usher partnered with the number-one selling dance game Microsoft Dance Central 3. Exclusively made on Kinect for Xbox 360. His role in the game was to bring his iconic talent and lend out his authentic choreography of his dance routines to his hit songs "Scream" and "OMG". Usher himself provides voiceover instruction for players participating in the Dance Central 3 game. At the launch of the game Usher gave a surprise performance of his song "Scream".

In 2013, Usher partnered with Samsung shooting a 2:28 minute short film directed by Rich Lee that included his single "Looking 4 Myself" from his then new album. The video features two Ushers in a face-off, as "down-to-earth" Usher seeks revenge against his "celebrity" alter ego after fame destroys his relationship. According to superstar, Hancock and The Matrix inspired the choreographed fight scenes with himself. The short film featured him using a Samsung's smart TV using the new motion control features that allows users to swipe through the channels. The commercial generated twenty-two million views making it the second highest viewed Samsung commercial behind LeBron's Day with the Samsung Galaxy Note II.

In 2015, Usher teamed up with Pepsi for The New Pepsi Challenge along celebrities Serena Williams, Usain Bolt, and many others. Every month, Pepsi "ambassadors" will use social media to issue a new challenge, many of which blend social responsibility with popular culture that encourages consumers to "do something different." Usher's challenge invited fans to capture a single photo of an image that they feel inspires and amazes others to look at the world in a new way. The winners photo would be selected and used in an upcoming Pepsi film.

In 2022, Usher teamed up with Rémy Martin; the company launched their first NFT's and also collectible bottles. Usher starred in television commercials to promote Rémy Martin Cognac Fine Champagne.

=== Philanthropy ===
Usher founded New Look, a non-profit charity organization which aims to "provide young people with a new look on life through education and real-world experience". Its flagship project, camp New Look, ran from July 11 to 23, 2005, in Clark Atlanta University. In 2006, the charity started an initiative called Our Block, for which it helped rebuild and revitalize city blocks in New Orleans. The project went on one street at a time, and the funding was helped through part of the proceeds of Usher's team-up with Armani Exchange in creating "Love 4 Life" dog tags, which were made available at the company's stores and Web site. Since then, Usher has launched chapters of New Look in such cities as Baltimore, Detroit, Los Angeles, Milwaukee, New York, and Washington, D.C. New Look has four basic pillars; Talent, Education, Service, and Career. New Look program begins in the 8th grade and progresses through a student's high school and post-secondary education. Education is the center focus, Usher and his program ensures this. Students who participate in Usher's New Look achieve 100% graduation rates and all of New Look participants go on to Higher Education or Job Placement.

In 1999, Usher participated in "Challenge for the Children", a benefit basketball game hosted by American boy band NSYNC. The event, which was held on the campus of Georgia State University, had raised an estimated $50,000 for several local charities. In 2005, Usher is one among the artists who signed on for a Hurricane Katrina relief concert. He has also performed a public service announcement to promote Do Something's campaign for civic engagement.

After the devastating events of Hurricane Katrina, Usher launched Project Restart that would go on to help more than 700 families with housing and keeping their lights on. Usher also while in New Orleans would meet with students from Dillard and Xavier to aid them with cleaning up the city. "I'm here to physically do something and hopefully motivate other people to do the same," said Usher in an interview. Usher, because of his efforts and dedication to helping the city of New Orleans rebuild was presented the key to the city of New Orleans in 2008 from former Mayor Ray Nagin. Also in this presentation, Usher in his honor was proclaimed his own day, Usher Day.

In 2011, Usher was honored with the Freedom Award by the National Civil Rights Museum in Memphis. The Freedom Awards honor individuals who work for justice, equality, philanthropy, civil and human rights and humanitarian causes. Raymond was awarded this honor for his philanthropic work done by his New Look Foundation. Others honored with this award in the past Usher included Oprah, Ruby Dee, Harry Belafonte, Cicely Tyson, Coretta Scott King, and other great figures.

On February 12, 2015, Usher visited his former hometown Chattanooga making a surprise visit at Dalewood Middle School, the Orange Grove Center and the Center for the Creative Arts. Dalewood is the middle school he attended before moving to Atlanta and the school is not that far away from the road "Usher Raymond Parkway" that was presented to Usher in 2001. Usher spoke to students at the Center for the Creative arts explaining the importance of education. His effort of giving back was to honor the legacy of his grandmother who passed early in the year. Who he called Nanny expressed to singer at a young age "whatever you want to do, I promise you can do it. We're going to look back one day, your teachers and I, and be very proud of you". At CCC, a donation of an undisclosed amount was made by the singer that would pay for new surfaces for the floors of two dance studios, a new digital lighting board and LED lights for the performing arts school's auditorium. Usher's second stop was Orange Grove Center, a nonprofit that serves adults and children with intellectual disabilities. There, he took part in a groundbreaking for planned improvements to the facility's track, said development director Heidi Hoffecker. The track will be named the Nancy Lackey Memorial Track to honor his grandmother.

In 2015, Usher teamed up with Anthony Anderson, Kevin Hart, Big Sean, Chris Paul, and more collectively donating more than $500,000 in scholarships that was given to 20 students attending historically black colleges and universities. This is following the partnership with the UNCF in 2014 creating the Usher Raymond Scholarship Program, where last year he gave a student $100,000 to attend the Tuskegee University.

In 2016, Usher, alongside Tyrese, Future, Ludacris, and Jeezy donated $25,000 each to the UNCF during the 33rd annual Atlanta's Mayors Ball.

On February 18, 2017, Morehouse College during the 29th annual "A Candle in the Dark Gala" honored Usher with the prestigious Candle Award for his philanthropy and contributions to music. The Candle Award honors recipients for excellence in athletics, business, education, entertainment, and other arenas. Past recipients honored at the "Candle in the Dark" include Stevie Wonder, Ray Charles, Quincy Jones, Berry Gordy, and Smokey Robinson.

On January 31, 2018, Usher helped former NFL quarterback Colin Kaepernick complete his pledge to donate $1 million to oppressed communities. To complete the final $100,000 of his goal, Kaepernick launched the #10for10 campaign He made 10 donations of $10,000 to 10 different charities with 10 celebrities matching him with $10,000. Usher selected the H.O.M.E. (Helping Oppressed Mothers Endure) charity in Lithonia, Georgia to receive a combined donation of $20,000.

=== Politics and activism ===
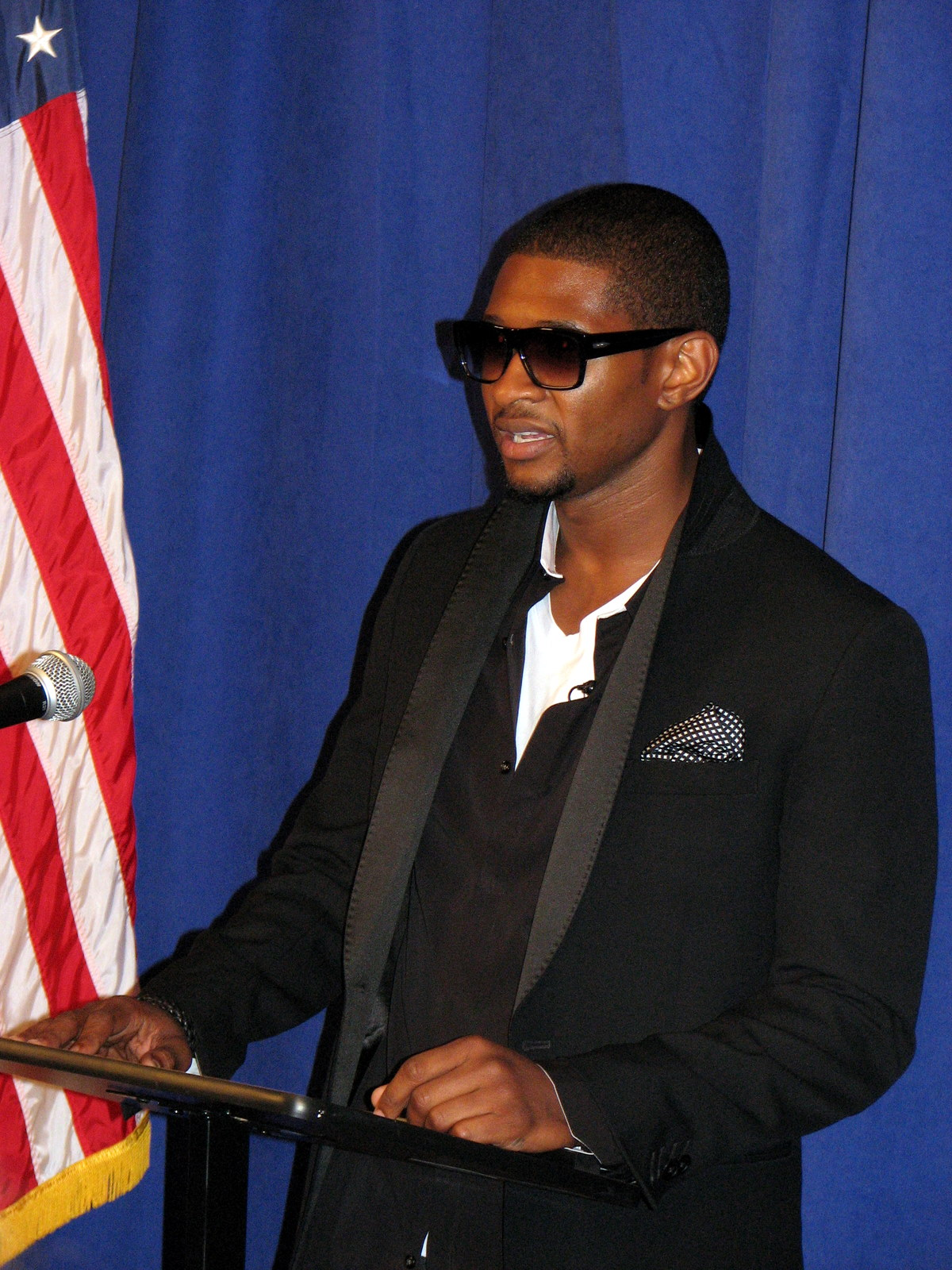
Usher giving a speech at the Service Nation Summit in 2008

In 2007, Usher launched his campaign in "Change in the South" in Atlanta, Georgia on the campus of Georgia Tech in support of then presidential hopeful Barack Obama. Obama asked Usher to serve as National Co-chair for his voter registration campaign "Vote for Change". Doing more groundwork for Obama the following year Usher and Kerry Washington would lead a rally on the campus of South Carolina State University in Orangeburg, S.C. In 2008, Usher supported the Service Nation campaign, serving as the Service Nation Youth Chair. Usher stated "As an artist, I am often recognized for the music I make and the performances I give. I'm blessed to have had the opportunity to be a part of many incredible moments. But this is the work that inspires me, empowering young people to become active in their communities". Usher also released an exclusive song "Hush" that was influenced by social issues and voting, In the video he features a motivational Barack Obama speech. Usher performed "Higher Ground" alongside Stevie Wonder and Shakira at the 2009 presidential inauguration at the Lincoln Memorial and the National Mall in Washington, D.C., on January 18, 2009. He continued to endorse Obama in 2012 and supported on the 2012 reelection campaign.

On September 13, 2014, Usher and Bill Clinton held a special campaign event for Georgia US Senate candidate Michelle Nunn. Nunn was honored for her work with the Points of Light Foundation at a charity event in 2010 and has been a semiregular attendee at Clinton Foundation events since 2009. Usher's New Look Foundation also awarded Clinton its Service Legacy Award in 2010.

In October 2015, Usher partnered with the organization Sankofa which focuses on issues of social injustice that disproportionately affect the disenfranchised, the oppressed, and the underserved. On October 23, 2015, Usher and the founder of Sankofa, Harry Belafonte, a veteran civil rights activist, led the conversation titled "Breaking the Chains of Social Injustice" at 92nd Street Y in Manhattan speaking about popular culture and activism. At this panel he introduced his music video "Chains" featuring Nas and Bibi Bourelly. The music video is geared towards facing the issues of social injustice and features images of Trayvon Martin, Rekia Boyd, Sean Bell, Marlon Brown, Ramarley Graham, Amadou Diallo, Caesar Cruz, and other recent victims of police violence.

In August 2015, he attended a major celebrity fundraiser at the Brentwood home of Scooter Braun held for presidential nominee Hillary Clinton. Kanye West, Kim Kardashian, and Tom Hanks were also among the crowd of 250 whose ticket prices were of $2,700 per person.

Usher was selected among a 33-member delegate for the Presidential Committee for Arts and Humanities of the United States of America to Cuba seeking to strengthen cultural ties between the two countries. Less than a month after the historic visit by President Barack Obama, a US government cultural mission to Cuba took place from April 18–21, 2016. The President described his trip as extending the hand of friendship to the Cuban people, and this delegation, including some of America's most distinguished writers, artists, musicians, as well as arts and cultural leaders, will continue this historic collaboration with the Cuban people.

In November 2026, at a stop in Atlanta during Usher's and Chris Brown's The R&B Tour, Usher paid tribute Keisha Lance Bottoms, the first Black woman ever elected as governor in the United States.

== Personal life ==
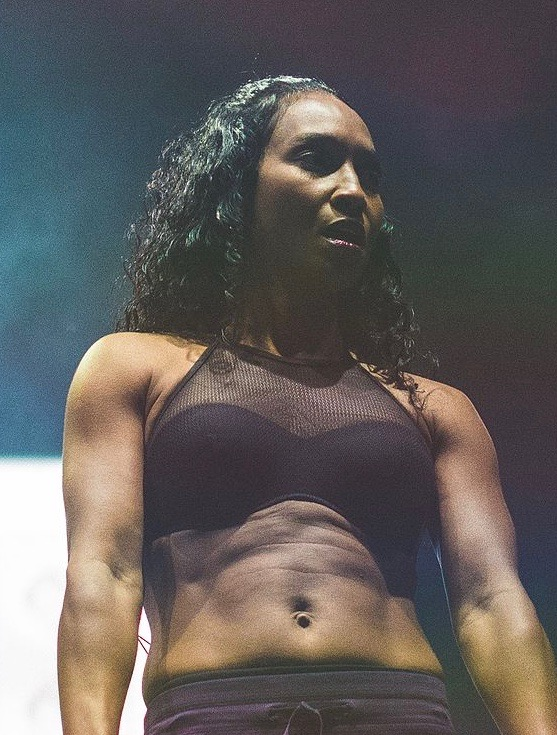
Chilli on stage

In 2001, Usher began dating TLC member Chilli Thomas, and their relationship lasted for three years. In 2003, Usher started working on the album that would become Confessions, which contained songs inspired by the personal lives of Usher and his collaborators. The songs about infidelity and pregnant mistresses were not inspired by Usher's private life, but by Jermaine Dupri's own personal challenges at the time. Dupri deliberately intended to create an air of mystery about Usher, and arouse fans' curiosity about how much of the infidelity story was Usher's own confession. The unintended result of this was to arouse Thomas's suspicions about Usher. They broke up in 2003.

This was followed by a media frenzy surrounding the personal nature of Confessions. Many fans believed that the infidelity portrayed in "Confessions" was real, and the real reason for the split. In February 2004, in an interview on The Bert Show on the Atlanta radio channel Q100, Thomas was perceived as insinuating that Usher cheated on her: "Usher did the ultimate no-no to me. ... I will never be with him again, and that is that". Usher defended: "it just didn't work out. But cheating is not what caused the relationship to collide and crash. That ain't what broke it up". This was backed up years later by Thomas, who said "People assumed that album was about us, but it was not."

In 2004, it was reported that Usher briefly dated British supermodel Naomi Campbell for a few months, together the pair attended the MTV Europe Music Awards and it was reported that Campbell jumped out of a pop out cake to surprise him for his birthday. The following year, he was linked to model Eishia Brightwell for some time. They were seen together at different events including the Grammy Awards, the Vanity Fair Oscar party and the NAACP Awards.

In November 2005, Usher began dating stylist Tameka Foster, who worked as his personal stylist for several years. Their engagement was announced in February 2007. After the sudden cancellation of a planned July wedding in the Hamptons, the two were wed on August 3, 2007, in a civil ceremony in Atlanta. This was followed by a larger wedding ceremony on September 1, 2007, held at the Chateau Elan Winery & Resort outside Atlanta.

Usher's father, Usher Raymond III, died on January 21, 2008.

Following his marriage to Foster, they had two sons together: Usher "Cinco" Raymond V, born in November 2007, and Naviyd Ely Raymond, born in December 2008.

In February 2009, two months after the birth of their second son, Foster suffered a cardiac arrest in São Paulo, Brazil, when she was given general anesthesia prior to scheduled cosmetic surgery (reportedly liposuction), which was ultimately not performed. She was induced into a coma to aid her recovery and was transferred to a larger facility, the Hospital Sírio-Libanês. Usher canceled his performance at Clive Davis's pre-Grammy Gala in order to fly to Brazil to be with Foster. After a week of recovery, Foster's surgeon issued a statement saying that she was "doing very well".

Usher filed for divorce from Foster in June 2009 in Atlanta. The divorce was legally finalized in Fulton County Court on November 4, 2009. This preceded a highly publicized child custody dispute spanning three years, which ultimately culminated on August 24, 2012, with a judge awarding Usher primary custody of his two sons with Foster.

In 2011, Forbes magazine placed Usher at number 32 on its Celebrity 100, and reported his earnings after the OMG Tour to stand at $46 million, ranking him at number 12 on "The World's 25 Highest-Paid Musicians" list.

Usher was reported to have adopted a vegan diet in 2012.

On August 5, 2013, his eldest son, Usher V, was hospitalized in the Intensive Care Unit (ICU) after he became stuck in a drain while swimming in a pool at Usher's home. The next day, Foster filed a request for an emergency custody hearing in Fulton County Superior Court, seeking temporary primary custody and citing Usher V's "near-death accident" as evidence of a lack of supervision of the children. At the hearing on August 9, 2013, the case was dismissed and Usher retained primary custody of their two sons.

In September 2015, Usher quietly married his long-time girlfriend and manager Grace Miguel while vacationing in Cuba. There was speculation of the two being married when Miguel's Instagram post showed a picture of a gold wedding band on Usher's finger. He confirmed the marriage during an interview on The Ellen DeGeneres Show.

On March 6, 2018, Usher and wife Grace Miguel informed Us Weekly of their separation in a statement that read, in part: "After much thought and consideration we have mutually decided to separate as a couple ... We remain deeply connected, loving friends who will continue supporting each other through the next phases of our lives". On December 28, 2018, Usher filed for divorce from Miguel in Georgia.

In September 2020, it was confirmed that Usher was expecting his third child, with music executive Jenn Goicoechea, whom he reportedly started dating in October 2019. Their daughter was born on September 24, 2020. Usher and Goicoecha had second child together on September 29, 2021. Usher and Goiciechea married in Las Vegas, Nevada on February 11, 2024, immediately following Usher's Super Bowl performance.

=== Legal issues ===
In 2012, Usher reportedly paid $1.1 million to settle a claim brought by an unnamed celebrity stylist who alleged that he had transmitted genital herpes to her without disclosing his diagnosis. Details of the settlement became public in 2017, following the release of purported court documents outlining the allegations. In August that year, three other claimants sued Usher, alleging fraud, sexual battery, negligence, and intentional and negligent infliction of emotional distress after he allegedly failed to disclose that he had the herpes virus before engaging in sexual activity with them. Represented by attorney Lisa Bloom, the plaintiffs included Quantasia Sharpton and two anonymous individuals, identified as Jane Doe and John Doe. Sharpton said she had sexual contact with Usher after attending one of his concerts, although she tested negative for the virus. Bloom stated that one of the other plaintiffs had tested positive, but said she did not know whether Usher had herpes. Usher denied the allegations in a formal response filed by his legal team. In December 2019, he reportedly reached an agreement with Sharpton and the two anonymous plaintiffs, resolving their claims. The terms were not disclosed.

== Discography ==
Solo studio albums

- Usher (1994)
- My Way (1997)
- 8701 (2001)
- Confessions (2004)
- Here I Stand (2008)
- Raymond v. Raymond (2010)
- Looking 4 Myself (2012)
- Hard II Love (2016)
- Coming Home (2024)

Collaborative albums

- A (with Zaytoven) (2018)

== Concert tours and residencies ==
Headlining

- Evolution 8701 Tour (2002)
- Truth Tour (2004)
- One Night Stand Tour (2008)
- OMG Tour (2010–2011)
- The UR Experience Tour (2014–2015)
- RNB Fridays Live (2018)
- Usher: Past Present Future (2024)

Co-headlining

- The R&B Tour (with Chris Brown) (2026)

Concert residencies

- Usher: The Las Vegas Residency (2021)
- My Way: The Vegas Residency (2022)
- Rendez-Vous Á Paris (2023)

Opening act

- Share My World Tour (1997–1998)
- The Velvet Rope Tour (1998–1999)
- No Way Out Tour (1998)

== Filmography ==
=== Film ===
- The Faculty (1998)
- She's All That (1999)
- Light It Up (1999)
- Texas Rangers (2001)
- In The Mix (2005)
- Killers (2010)
- Scary Movie 5 (2013)
- Muppets Most Wanted (2014)
- Black Knight Decoded (2015)
- Hands of Stone (2016)
- Popstar: Never Stop Never Stopping (2016)
- People You May Know (2017)
- Burden (2018)
- Hustlers (2019)
- Bad Hair (2020)

=== Television ===
- The Bold & the Beautiful (1999) as Raymond
- Geppetto (2000) as Pleasure Island Ringleader

== Stage productions ==
- Chicago as Billy Flynn (2006; Broadway)

== See also ==
- Honorific nicknames in popular music
- List of best-selling singles
- List of bestselling albums
- List of bestselling music artists
- List of bestselling music artists in the United States
- List of artists who reached number one in the United States
- List of Billboard Hot 100 chart achievements and milestones
