= Usher's New Look =

American non-profit organization

- Formation: 1999; 27 years ago
- Headquarters: Atlanta, Georgia
- Founder: Usher
- Key people: Usher; (Founder & Chairman); Careshia Moore; (CEO & President); Jessica Martinez; (Chief Development Officer); Geoff Streat; (Chief Operating Officer); Kim Williams; (Chief Marketing Officer)
- Website: ushersnewlook.org

Usher's New Look is a non-profit organization founded by the musical performer Usher in 1999, with the help of his mother Jonetta Patton. The organization is aimed at improving the lives of disadvantaged children and adolescents.

The organization has several offerings and programs that include grade specific programming, peer-to-peer training, and mentorship programs.

== Background ==
Usher founded the Usher's New Look in 1999, with the help of his mother, Jonetta Patton. The foundation was set up in order to reach under-served youth. A then 19-year-old Usher and his mother sat in the back of an Atlanta courtroom, listening to juvenile court hearings. Listening to the stories, together they were inspired and wanted to give opportunities to children by giving them a new outlook on life.
