= List of awards and nominations received by Usher =

Usher awards and nominations
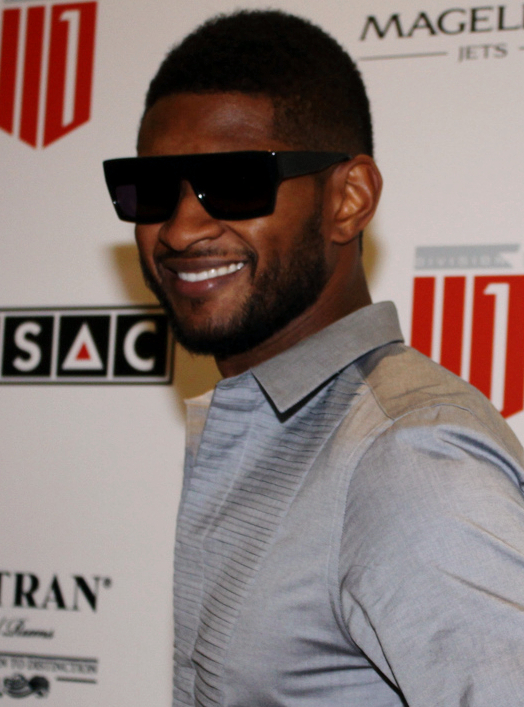
- Usher at Rico Love's Division 1 launch in 2010
Awards and nominations
Award	Wins	Nominations
American Music Awards	8	14
BET	7	26
Billboard	18	50
Grammy	8	23
MTV VMA	2	18
NAACP	6	11
Nickelodeon Kids' Choice	3	8
People's Choice	3	12
Soul Train	12	43
Teen Choice	7	32
World Music	4	13
Emmy Awards	0	1

Totals (Note: Certain award groups do not simply award one winner. They acknowledge several different recipients, have runners-up, and have third place. Since this is a specific recognition and is different from losing an award, runner-up mentions are considered wins in this award tally. For simplification and to avoid errors, each award in this list has been presumed to have had a prior nomination.)
- Wins: 360
- Nominations: 669

Usher is an American R&B singer. He has received multiple awards and nominations for his work in music and film. His awards are predominantly in R&B, Pop, and hip-hop genre categories.

Throughout the course of his career, Usher has won eight Grammy awards, 35 ASCAP Awards, 18 Billboard Music Awards, 14 BMI Awards, 12 Soul Train Music Awards, and eight American Music Awards. For his contributions to music, Usher has received a Musical Arts Award at The BET Honors, a Golden Note award at the ASCAP Awards, and inductions into the Georgia Music Hall of Fame and Hollywood Walk of Fame. Outside of music, he's received accolades such as the Freedom Award and President's Volunteer Service Award for his charitable efforts, and an NBA Championship with the Cleveland Cavaliers via part ownership. According to Fuse in 2014, Usher was the 10th most awarded recording artist of all time, winning 356 awards from 665 nominations.

His sophomore studio album My Way (1997) earned Grammy Award nominations for "You Make Me Wanna" and "My Way" as Best Male R&B Vocal performance. He received his first MTV Video Music Award nomination as Best R&B Video for the former and won three Billboard Music Awards including Top Artist in 1998. He also received an NAACP Image Award nomination as Outstanding Actor in a Daytime Drama Series for his appearance on the soap opera The Bold and the Beautiful in 1999. His third studio album, 8701 (2001) generated the singles "U Remind Me", "U Got It Bad", and "U Don't Have to Call". He won his first two Grammy Awards as Best Male R&B Vocal Performance.

His fourth studio album, Confessions (2004) received the most nominations at the 2004 Billboard Music Awards, with 21. He took home 14, including Top Billboard 200 Album, Hot 100 Artist of the Year, Artist of the Year. In 2005, he won the Sammy Davis Jr. Award for Entertainer of the Year and was named Man of the Year at the Glamour Awards. At the 48th Annual Grammy Awards, he won Best Contemporary R&B Album, Best Rap/Sung Collaboration, and Best R&B Performance by a Duo or Group with Vocals.

His fifth studio album, Here I Stand (2008) produced title track "Here I Stand" was nominated for the Best Male R&B Vocal Performance award at the 51st Grammy Awards. Raymond v. Raymond (2010) produced "OMG" which won Top R&B Song and also received Best Contemporary R&B Album and Best Male R&B Vocal Performance for "There Goes My Baby". Usher won Favorite Soul/R&B Male Artist at the AMAs and International Male Artists Of The Year at the NRJ Music Awards in 2011. Looking 4 Myself (2012) produced "Climax" which won Best R&B Performance in 2013.

== ADC Awards ==
The ADC is the first global organization to celebrate and award leaders in creative communications. The ADC Annual Awards, part of The One Club for Creativity, is the oldest continuously running industry award show in the world. Usher has won one award.

Year	Nominated work	Award	Result	Ref.
2016	Don't Look Away	Advertising Music Video: Music Video	Bronze	
2022	Team Up For Excellence - The Film	Branded Content Entertainment: Online Video - Long Form	Merit Honor	
2022	Team Up For Excellence - The Film	Branded Entertainment: Entertainment - TV/Film	Merit Honor	

== AD Stars ==
Ad Stars is an international advertising festival.

Year	Nominated work	Award	Result	Ref.
2016	Don't Look Away	Public Service Advertising: Human Rights	Won	
2016	Don't Look Away	Diverse Insights	Gold	
2016	Don't Look Away	Video Stars: Branded Entertainment Videos	Silver	
2016	Don't Look Away	Direct: Use of Direct Marketing: Use of Digital in a Direct Marketing Campaign	Silver	
2016	Don't Look Away	Promotion: Use of Promo & Activation	Bronze	

== American Music Awards ==
The American Music Awards is an annual awards ceremony created by Dick Clark in 1973.

Year	Nominated work	Award	Result	Ref.
2004	Usher	Artist of the Year	Nominated	
2004	Usher	Favorite Soul/R&B Male Artist	Won	
2004	Usher	Favorite Pop/Rock Male Artist	Won	
2004	Confessions	Favorite Soul/R&B Album	Won	
2004	Confessions	Favorite Pop/Rock Album	Won	
2008	Usher	Favorite Soul/R&B Male Artists	Nominated	
2008	Usher	Favorite Pop/Rock Male Artists	Nominated	
2010	Usher	Favorite Pop/Rock Male Artists	Nominated	
2010	Usher	Favorite Soul/R&B Male Artists	Won	
2010	Raymond V Raymond	Favorite Soul/R&B Album	Won	
2011	Usher	Favorite Soul/R&B Male Artist	Won	
2012	Usher	Favorite Soul/R&B Male Artist	Won	
2012	Usher	Favorite Pop/Rock Male Artist	Nominated	
2012	Looking 4 Myself	Favorite Soul/R&B Album	Nominated	
2021	Usher	Favorite Soul/R&B Male Artist	Nominated	
2025	Usher	Favorite Male R&B Artist	Nominated	

== ASCAP Awards ==
The ASCAP Awards are held annually by the American Society of Composers, Authors and Publishers.

=== ASCAP Latin Awards ===
Year	Nominated Work	Category	Result	Ref
2012	"Promise" (featuring Usher)	Tropical Song of the Year	Won	

=== ASCAP Pop Awards ===
The ASCAP Pop Music Awards honors the songwriters and publishers of the most performed pop songs.

Year	Nominated work	Award	Ref.
2003	"U Got It Bad"	Most Performed Songs	
2005	"Burn"	Most Performed Songs	
2005	"Confessions Part II"	Most Performed Songs	
2005	"Yeah" (with Ludacris & Lil Jon)	Most Performed Songs	
2006	"My Boo"	Most Performed Songs	
2006	"Caught Up"	Most Performed Songs	
2011	"DJ Got Us Falling In Love"	Most Performed Songs	
2012	"More"	Most Performed Songs	
2013	"Without You" (with David Guetta)	Most Performed Songs	
2013	"Scream"	Most Performed Songs	

=== ASCAP Rhythm & Soul Awards ===
ASCAP honors its top members in a series of annual awards shows in seven different music categories: pop, rhythm and soul, film and television, Latin, country, Christian, and concert music.

Year	Nominated work	Award	Ref.
1999	"Nice & Slow"	Award Winning R&B/Hip-Hop Songs	
1999	"U Make Me Wanna"	Award Winning R&B/Hip-Hop Songs	
2003	"I Need A Girl" (with Puff Daddy)	Award Winning Rap Songs	
2003	"I Need A Girl" (with Puff Daddy)	Award Winning R&B/Hip-Hop Songs	
2003	"U Don't Have to Call"	Award Winning R&B/Hip-Hop Songs	
2003	U Got it Bad	Award Winning R&B/Hip-Hop Songs	
2015	"Good Kisser"	Award Winning R&B/Hip-Hop Songs	
2005	"Burn"	Award Winning R&B/Hip-Hop Songs	
2005	"My Boo" (with Alicia Keys)	Award Winning R&B/Hip-Hop Songs	
2005	"Confessions Part II"	Award Winning R&B/Hip-Hop Songs	
2006	"My Boo" (with Alicia Keys)	Award Winning R&B/Hip-Hop Songs	
2009	"Love In This Club" (with Young Jeezy)	Award Winning R&B/Hip-Hop Songs	
2010	"Here I Stand"	Award Winning R&B/Hip-Hop Songs	
2010	'Trading Places"	Award Winning R&B/Hip-Hop Songs	
2011	"Hey Daddy (Daddy's Home)"	Award Winning R&B/Hip-Hop Songs	
2011	"Papers"		
2013	Usher	Golden Note Award	
2013	"Climax"	Award Winning R&B/Hip-Hop Songs	
2013	"Lemme See" (with Rick Ross)	Award Winning R&B/Hip-Hop Songs	
2015	"Good Kisser"	Award Winning R&B/Hip-Hop Songs	
2016	New Flame" (with Chris Brown & Rick Ross)	Award Winning R&B/Hip-Hop Songs	
2017	No Limit (with Young Thug)	Award Winning R&B/Hip-Hop Songs	
2018	"Party" (with Chris Brown & Usher)	Award Winning R&B/Hip-Hop Songs	
2021	"Come Thru" (with Summer Walker)	Award Winning R&B/Hip-Hop Songs	
2024	"Glu"	Award Winning R&B/Hip-Hop Songs	
2024	"Good Good" (with Summer Walker & 21 Savage)	Award Winning R&B/Hip-Hop Songs	

== BBC Music Awards ==
The BBC Music Awards are the BBC's annual pop music awards, held every December, as a celebration of the musical achievements over the past twelve months. The event is coordinated by the BBC's music division, BBC Music.

Year	Performance	Award	Result	Ref.
2016	"Climax"	BBC Radio 1 Live Lounge Performance of the Year	Nominated	

== BDS Certified Spin Awards ==
Nielsen Broadcast Data Systems, better known as BDS, is a service that tracks monitored radio, television and internet airplay of songs based on the number of spins and detections.

Year	Performance	Award	Result	Ref.
2002	"You Make Me Wanna"	400,000 Spins	Won	
2002	"U Got It Bad"	300,000 Spins	Won	
2002	"U Don't Have to Call"	50,000 Spins	Won	
2002	"I Need A Girl" (with Puff Daddy)	100,000 Spins	Won	
2002	"U Don't Have To Call"	200,000 Spins	Won	
2003	U Got It Bad	400,000 Spins	Won	
2004	"Yeah" (with Ludacris & Lil Jon)	50,000 Spins	Won	
2004	"Yeah" (with Ludacris & Lil Jon)	100,000 Spins	Won	
2004	"Yeah" (with Ludacris & Lil Jon)	200,000 Spins	Won	
2004	"Burn"	50,000 Spins	Won	
2004	"Burn"	100,000 Spins	Won	
2004	"Yeah" (with Ludacris & Lil Jon)	300,000 Spins	Won	
2004	"Yeah" (with Ludacris & Lil Jon)	500,000 Spins	Won	
2004	"Lovers and Friends" (with Ludacris & Lil Jon)	50,000 Spins	Won	
2005	"Caught Up"	50,000 Spins	Won	
2005	"My Boo"	300,000 Spins	Won	
2005	"Lovers and Friends" (with Ludacris & Lil Jon)	100,000 Spins	Won	
2005	"Caught Up"	200,000 Spins	Won	
2005	"Lovers and Friends" (with Ludacris & Lil Jon)	200,000 Spins	Won	
2006	"You Make Me Wanna"	500,000 Spins	Won	
2006	"Yeah" (with Ludacris & Lil Jon)	700,000 Spins	Won	
2007	"Caught Up"	300,000 Spins	Won	
2007	"U Got it Bad"	500,000 Spins	Won	
2007	"My Boo"	400,000 Spins	Won	
2007	"U Remind Me"	300,000 Spins	Won	
2009	"Yeah" (with Ludacris & Lil Jon)	800,000 Spins	Won	
2010
2010	"Hot Tottie" (with Jay Z)	50,000 Spins	Won	
2010	"Yeah" (with Ludacris & Lil Jon)	900,000 Spins	Won	
2010	"OMG" (with Will.I.Am)	200,000 Spins	Won	
2010	"OMG" (with Will.I.Am)	400,000 Spins	Won	
2010	"DJ Got Us Falling In Love" (with Pitbull)	100,000 Spins	Won	
2010	"DJ Got Us Falling In Love'" (with Pitbull)	300,000 Spins	Won	
2010	"DJ Got Us Falling In Love'" (with Pitbull)	400,000 Spins	Won	
2011	"OMG" (with Will.I.Am)	500,000 Spins	Won	
2011	"DJ Got Us Falling In Love'" (with Pitbull)	500,000 Spins	Won	
2011	"More"	100,000 Spins	Won	
2011	"More"	200,000 Spins	Won	
2011	"Hot Tottie" (with Jay Z)	100,000 Spins	Won	

== BET Awards ==
The BET Awards were established in 2001 by the Black Entertainment Television network to celebrate African Americans and other minorities in music, acting, sports, and other fields of entertainment. Usher has won 7 awards from 26 nominations. He was also honoured with the Lifetime Achievement Award for his notable contributions to the music industry in 2024.

Year	Nominee / work	Award	Result	Ref.
2002	Usher	Best Male R&B Artist	Won	
2002	"U Got It Bad"	Video of the Year	Nominated	
2004	Usher	Best Male R&B Artist	Won	
2004	"Yeah" (with Ludacris & Lil Jon)	Viewer's Choice	Won	
2004	"Yeah" (with Ludacris & Lil Jon)	Video of the Year	Nominated	
2004	"Yeah" (with Ludacris & Lil Jon)	Best Collaboration	Nominated	
2005	"My Boo" (with Alicia Keys)	Best Collaboration	Nominated	
2005	Usher	Best Male R&B Artist	Won	
2010	Usher	Best Male R&B Artist	Nominated	
2011	Usher	Best Male R&B Artist	Nominated	
2012	Usher	Best Male R&B Artist	Nominated	
2012	"Climax"	Video of the Year	Nominated	
2013	Usher	Best Male R&B Artist	Nominated	
2015	Usher	Best Male R&B/Pop Artist	Nominated	
2015	"New Flame" (with Chris Brown & Rick Ross)	Video of the Year	Nominated	
2015	"New Flame" (with Chris Brown & Rick Ross)	Best Collaboration	Nominated	
2017	Usher	Best Male R&B/Pop Artist	Nominated	
2017	"Party" (with Chris Brown and Gucci Mane)	Best Collaboration	Nominated	
2017	"Crush" (with Yuna)	Centric Award	Nominated	
2020	Usher	Best Male R&B/Pop Artist	Nominated	
2023	Usher	Best Male R&B/Pop Artist	Won	
2024	Usher	Best Male R&B/Pop Artist	Won	
2024	Usher	Lifetime Achievement Award	Won	
2024	Coming Home	Album of the Year	Nominated	
2024	"Good Good" (with Summer Walker and 21 Savage)	Video of the Year	Nominated	
2024	"Good Good" (with Summer Walker and 21 Savage)	Best Collaboration	Nominated	

=== BET Hip Hop Awards ===
The BET Hip Hop Awards are hosted annually by BET for hip hop performers, producers and music video directors.

Year	Nominated work	Award	Result	Ref.
2022	Good Love (with Usher)	Best Hip Hop Video	Nominated	
2022	Good Love (with Usher)	Best Collaboration	Nominated	

=== The BET Honors ===
The BET Honors, established in 2008 by the Black Entertainment Television network, celebrate the lives and achievements of African-American luminaries. The awards, presented annually, are broadcast on BET during Black History Month.

Year	Nominee/Work	Award	Ref.
2015	Usher	Musical Arts Award	

== Billboard Awards ==
=== Billboard All Time Chart Awards ===
Year	Nominee/Work	Award	Result	Ref.
2009	Usher	Top Artist of the Decade	#2	
2009	Usher	Hot 100 Artist of the Decade	#1	
2010	Usher	Top 50 R&B/Hip-Hop Artists of the Past 25 Years	#6	
2014	"Climax"	20 Best Songs of 2012: Critics' Picks	#1	
2019	Usher	Top Artist of the Decade	#42	
2019	Usher	Top R&B/Hip-Hop Artist of the Decade	#14	
2019	Usher	Greatest of All Time	#23	
2019	"OMG"	Hot 100 Songs of the Decade	#60	
2019	Raymond v. Raymond	Top R&B/Hip-Hop Albums of the Decade	#33	
2019	Raymond v. Raymond	Billboard Albums of the Decade	#117	
2019	There Goes My Baby	Top R&B/Hip-Hop Songs of the Decade	#17	
2019	Climax	Top R&B/Hip-Hop Songs of the Decade	#25	
2019	"Promise" (with Romeo Santos)	Hot Latin Songs of the Decade	#26	

=== Billboard Greatest Pop Star ===
Year	Nominee/Work	Award	Ref.
2004	Usher	The Greatest Pop Star By Year	

=== Billboard Mid-Year Music Awards ===
Voted online on Billboard's official website, the Billboard Mid-Year Music Award honors artists and shows for their achievements in music in the first half of the year in the United States.

Year	Nominee/Work	Award	Ref.
2013	The Voice	Best Music Reality Show	

=== Billboard Music Awards ===
The Billboard Music Awards are sponsored by Billboard magazine and is held annually in December. The awards are based on sales data by Nielsen SoundScan and radio information by Nielsen Broadcast Data Systems.

Year	Nominated work	Award	Result	Ref.
1998	Usher	Artist of the Year	Won	
1998	Usher	Hot 100 Singles Artist of the Year	Won	
1998	Usher	R&B/Hip-hop Artist of the Year	Won	
1998	Usher	R&B/Hip-Hop Singles Artist of the Year	Nominated	
1998	"Nice & Slow"	R&B/Hip-hop Airplay singles track of the Year	Nominated	
1998	My Way	Male Album of the Year	Nominated	
2002	Usher	Male Artist of the Year	Nominated	
2002	Usher	Hot 100 Singles Artist of the Year	Nominated	
2002	Usher	Hot 100 Singles Male Artist of the Year	Nominated	
2002	Usher	R&B/Hip-Hop Artist of the Year	Nominated	
2002	Usher	R&B/Hip-Hop Singles Artist of the Year	Nominated	
2002	"U Don't Have to Call"	R&B/Hip-hop Single of the Year	Nominated	
2004	Usher	Artists of the Year	Won	
2004	Usher	Hot 100 Artists of the Year	Won	
2004	Usher	Billboard 200 Artist of the Year	Won	
2004	Usher	Mainstream Top 40 Artist of the Year	Won	
2004	Usher	R&B/Hip-Hop Artists of the Year	Won	
2004	Usher	R&B/Hip-Hop Albums Artists of the Year	Won	
2004	Usher	R&B/Hip-Hop Singles Artists of the Year	Nominated	
2004	Usher	Digital Artist of the Year	Nominated	
2004	"Burn"	Hot 100 Single of the Year	Nominated	
2004	"Burn"	Hot 100 Airplay Single of the Year	Nominated	
2004	"Burn"	R&B/Hip-hop Single of the Year	Nominated	
2004	"Burn"	R&B/Hip-hop Airplay Single of the Year	Nominated	
2004	"Yeah!"	R&B/Hip-hop Airplay Single of the Year	Nominated	
2004	"Yeah!"	R&B/Hip-hop Single of the Year	Nominated	
2004	"Yeah!"	Hot 100 Airplay Single of the Year	Won	
2004	"Yeah!"	Hot 100 Single of the Year	Won	
2004	"Yeah!"	Mainstream Top 40 Single of the Year	Won	
2004	Confessions	Billboard 200 Albums of the Year	Won	
2004	Confessions	R&B/Hip-Hop Album of the Year	Won	
2005	"Lovers and Friends"	R&B/Hip-Hop Single of the Year	Nominated	
2005	"Lovers and Friends"	R&B/Hip-hop Airplay Single of the Year	Nominated	
2005	"Lovers and Friends"	Ringtone of the Year	Nominated	
2005	"Lovers and Friends"	Rap single of the Year	Won	
2011	"DJ Got Us Fallin' In Love"	Top Radio Song	Nominated	
2011	"OMG"	Top Radio Song	Nominated	
2011	"OMG"	Top Hot 100 Song	Nominated	
2011	"OMG"	Top R&B Song	Won	
2011	"There Goes My Baby"	Top R&B Song	Nominated	
2011	Usher	Top Hot 100 Artists	Nominated	
2011	Usher	Top Male Artists	Nominated	
2011	Usher	Top R&B Artists	Won	
2011	Usher	Top Radio Songs Artists	Nominated	
2011	Raymond V Raymond	Top R&B Album	Won	
2012	"Promise"	Top Latin Song	Nominated	
2012	"Without You"	Top Dance Song	Nominated	
2012	"Without You"	Top Streaming Song (audio)	Nominated	
2013	Usher	R&B Artist of the Year	Nominated	
2013	Looking 4 Myself	R&B Album of the Year	Nominated	
2022	Usher (The Vegas Residency)	Top R&B Tour	Nominated	

=== Billboard R&B/Hip-Hop Awards ===
The Billboard R&B/Hip-Hop Awards reflect the performance of recordings on the Hot R&B/Hip-Hop Songs and Hot Rap Tracks.

Year	Nominated work	Award	Result	Ref.
2002	Usher	Top R&B/Hip-Hop Singles Artists	Won	
2002	Usher	Top R&B/Hip-Hop Artists Male	Won	
2002	Usher	Top R&B/Hip-Hop Artists	Won	
2002	Usher	Top R&B/Hip-Hop Single	Nominated	
2002	Usher	Top R&B/Hip-Hop Album	Nominated	
2002	Usher	Top Top R&B/Hip-Hop Singles - Airplay	Nominated	
2002	Usher	Top Top R&B/Hip-Hop Singles - Sales	Nominated	
2002	Usher	Top R&B/Hip-Hop Album Artist	Nominated	
2005	"Lovers and Friends"	Hot Rap Tracks	Won	
2005	Confessions	Top R&B/Hip-Hop Albums Artists	Won	
2005	Confessions	Top R&B/Hip-Hop Albums	Won	
2005	Usher	Top R&B/Hip-Hop Singles Artists	Won	
2005	Usher	Top R&B/Hip-Hop Artists Male	Won	
2005	Usher	Top R&B/Hip-Hop Artists	Won	

=== Billboard Touring Awards ===
Year	Nominated work	Award	Result	Ref.
2011	Usher's OMG tour, with Miguel, Trey Songz	Top Package	Nominated	
2011	Usher's OMG tour, with Miguel, Trey Songz	Top Arena	Won	

=== Billboard Video Music Awards ===
Year	Nominated work	Award	Result	Ref.
1998	"My Way"	Best Clip (R&B/Urban)	Nominated	
1998	"Nice And Slow"	Maximum Vision Award	Nominated	

=== Billboard Latin Music Awards ===
The Billboard Latin Music Awards grew out of the Billboard Music Awards program from Billboard Magazine, an industry publication charting the sales and radio airplay success of musical recordings.

Year	Nominee / work	Award	Result	Ref.
2011	Usher	Crossover Artist Of The Year	Won	
2012	"Promise" (with Romeo Santos)	Song Of The Year, Vocal Event	Nominated	
2012	"Promise" (with Romeo Santos)	Tropical Song Of The Year	Nominated	
2012	"Promise" (with Romeo Santos)	Digital Songs	Nominated	
2012	"Promise" (with Romeo Santos)	Streaming Songs	Nominated	

=== Billboard Year-End Chart Awards ===
The Billboard Year-End Chart Awards are published annually to honor the artists in many categories announced by Billboard both in the press and as part of their year-end issue.

Year	Nominee/Work	Award	Result	Ref.
2008	Usher	Top Artist - Male	#9	
2008	Usher	Top Artist	#22	
2008	Usher	Hot 100 Artist - Male	#9	
2008	Usher	Hot 100 Artist Artist	#22	
2008	Usher	Billboard 200 Artist - Male	#10	
2008	Usher	Billboard 200 Artist	#27	
2008	Usher	Top R&B/Hip-Hop Artist	#8	
2008	Usher	Top R&B/Hip-Hop Artist - Male	#5	
2008	Usher	Top R&B/Hip-Hop Artist Song Artist	#11	
2008	Usher	Top R&B/Hip-Hop Artist Album Artist	#7	
2008	"Love In This Club" with Young Jeezy	Hot 100 Songs	#8	
2008	"Love In This Club" with Young Jeezy	Mainstream R&B/Hip-Hop Songs	#8	
2008	"Love In This Club" with Young Jeezy	R&B/Hip-Hop Airplay Songs	#15	
2008	"Love In This Club" with Young Jeezy	Hot R&B/Hip-Hop Songs	#15	
2008	"Love In This Club Part II" with Lil Wayne and Beyoncé	Mainstream R&B/Hip-Hop Songs	#37	
2008	"Love In This Club Part II" with Lil Wayne and Beyoncé	R&B/Hip-Hop Airplay Songs	#46	
2008	"Love In This Club Part II" with Lil Wayne and Beyoncé	Hot R&B/Hip-Hop Songs	#46	
2008	Here I Stand	Billboard 200 Albums	#27	
2008	Here I Stand	Top R&B/Hip-Hop Artist Albums	#7	
2009	Usher	Top R&B/Hip-Hop Artist	#21	
2009	Usher	Adult R&B Artist	#7	
2009	Usher	Hot R&B/Hip-Hop Song Artist	#12	
2009	"Papers"	Hot R&B/Hip-Hop Songs	#89	
2009	"Trading Places"	Hot R&B/Hip-Hop Airplay Songs	#32	
2009	"Trading Places"	Hot R&B/Hip-Hop Songs	#32	
2009	"Here I Stand"	Hot R&B/Hip-Hop Airplay Songs	#41	
2009	"Here I Stand"	Hot R&B/Hip-Hop Songs	#41	

== Black Music & Entertainment Walk of Fame ==
The Black Music & Entertainment Walk of Fame, located in Atlanta, Georgia, was inaugurated in January 2021. The monument aims to honor African Americans and Black people globally for their accomplishments in entertainment. Situated in the historic Downtown Atlanta area, the Walk of Fame graces the sidewalks of Martin Luther King Jr. Drive and Northside Drive.

Year	Nominated work	Award	Result	Ref.
2021	Usher	Inaugural inductee	Won	

== Blockbuster Entertainment Awards ==
The Blockbuster Entertainment Awards was a film awards ceremony, founded by Blockbuster Inc., that ran from 1995 until 2001. The awards were produced by Ken Ehrlich every year.

Year	Nominated work	Award	Result	Ref.
1999	Usher	Best R&B Singer	Won	

== BMI Awards ==
The BMI Awards are annual award ceremonies for songwriters in various genres organized by Broadcast Music, Inc., based in the United States and honoring songwriters and publishers.

=== BMI Latin Awards ===
Year	Nominated Work	Category	Result	Ref
2012	"Promise" (featuring Usher)	Award-Winning Songs	Won	

=== BMI London Awards ===
Year	Nominated Work	Category	Result	Ref
2011	"DJ Got Us Falling In Love" (with Pitbull)	Award-Winning Songs	Won	
2012	"Without You" (with Usher)	Award-Winning Songs	Won	

=== BMI Pop Awards ===
Year	Nominated work	Award	Result	Ref.
2005	"Yeah" (with Ludacris and Lil Jon)	Award-Winning Songs	Won	
2006	"Lovers and Friends" (with Ludacris and Lil Jon)	Award-Winning Songs	Won	
2009	"Love In This Club" (with Young Jeezy)	Award-Winning Songs	Won	
2012	"DJ Got Us Falling In Love"	Award-Winning Songs	Won	
2012	"OMG" (with will.i.Am)	Award-Winning Songs	Won	
2013	"Without You" (with Usher)	Award-Winning Songs	Won	

=== BMI R&B/Hip-Hop Awards ===
Year	Nominated Work	Category	Result	Ref
2016	"I Don't Mind" (with Juicy J)	Most Performed R&B/Hip-Hop Songs	Won	
2017	"No Limit" (with Young Thug)	Most Performed R&B/Hip-Hop Songs	Won	

=== BMI Urban Awards ===
Year	Nominated work	Award	Result	Ref.
2003	I Need a Girl (Part One) (featuring Usher)	Award-Winning Songs	Won	
2005	Yeah!	Award-Winning Songs	Won	
2005	Yeah!	Song of the Year	Won	
2005	Yeah!	Urban Ringtone of the Year	Won	
2006	"Lovers and Friends" (with Ludacris and Usher)	Award-Winning Songs	Won	
2009	"Love In This Club" (with Young Jeezy)	Award-Winning Songs	Won	
2011	Hey Daddy	Award-Winning Songs	Won	
2011	Hot Tottie (with Jay-Z)	Award-Winning Songs	Won	
2011	OMG (with will.i.Am)	Award-Winning Songs	Won	
2011	Papers	Award-Winning Songs	Won	
2015	"New Flame" (with Usher & Rick Ross)	Award-Winning Songs	Won	

== Boys & Girls Clubs of America ==
The Boys & Girls Clubs of America (BGCA) is a national organization of local chapters which provide after-school programs for young people. The BGCA recognizes distinguished Alumni from professional athletes, business leaders, actors, and musicians that got their start at their hometown Boys & Girls Club.

Year	Category	Ref.
2009	Hall of Fame	

== Bravo Otto ==
The Bravo Otto award is a German accolade honoring excellence of performers in film, television and music. Presented annually since 1957, winners are selected by the readers of Bravo magazine. The award is presented in gold, silver and bronze.

Year	Nominated work	Award	Result	Ref.
2004	Usher	Male Singer	Gold	

== BRIT Awards ==
The BRIT Awards are the British Phonographic Industry's annual pop music awards.

Year	Nominated work	Award	Result	Ref.
2005	Usher	Best International Male Solo Artists	Nominated	

== Campaign Big Awards ==
The Campaign Big Awards recognize the best agencies, campaigns and creative work of the year. The Campaign Media Awards celebrate creativity in the media business, with categories for both media agencies and media owners.

Year	Nominated work	Award	Result	Ref.
2016	Don't Look Away	Digital	Silver	

== Cannes Lions ==
The Cannes Lions International Festival of Creativity is an annual event for those working in creative communications, advertising, and related fields. It is considered the largest gathering of the advertising and creative communications industry.

Year	Nominated work	Award	Result	Ref.
2016	Don't Look Away	Music Content: Excellence in Interactive Music Video	Gold	
2016	Don't Look Away	Use of Film: Use of Online Film	Bronze	
2016	Don't Look Away	Digital & Social: Use of Digital Platforms	Bronze	
2016	Don't Look Away	Use of Radio: Use of Audio Technology	Bronze	

== Capital FM Awards ==
Capital is a network of eleven independent contemporary hit radio stations in the United Kingdom, broadcasting a mix of local and networked programming.

Year	Nominated work	Award	Result	Ref.
2012	Climax	Best Actor	Nom	

== Ciclope Festival ==
The CICLOPE Festival is the international conference and award show dedicated to craft in moving image. In the last few years, it has become a platform for directors, creatives, artists, producers and entertainment professionals to network.

Year	Nominated work	Award	Result	Ref.
2016	Don't Look Away	Interactive Video	Silver	

== Clio Awards ==
The Clio Awards is an annual award program that recognizes innovation and creative excellence in advertising, design and communication.

Year	Nominated work	Award	Result	Ref.
2013	Unsung Presents Usher	Medium Engagement	Shortlist	
2016	Don't Look Away	Digital/Mobile: Websites	Gold	
2016	Don't Look Away	Social Good	Gold	
2016	Don't Look Away	Innovation	Silver	
2016	Don't Look Away	Public Service: Digital/Mobile	Silver	
2022	Team Up For Excellence - The Film	Cinematography	Bronze	

== Creative Circle ==
The Creative Circle (also known as The Advertising Creative Circle and The Advertising Creative Circle of Great Britain) is an educational awards body dedicated to creativity in British advertising, and the oldest advertising and marketing awards body in Europe.

Year	Nominated work	Award	Result	Ref.
2016	Don't Look Away	Filme: Best Music Promo Film	Gold	
2016	Don't Look Away	Digital: Best Site/Microsite	Gold	

== CreativePool ==
CreativePool is an annual awards that celebrate and showcase the best work, people, and companies from the past year and is the only creative awards competition which allows the audience to have a say in the winners. Usher has received one award.

Year	Nominated work	Award	Result	Ref.
2016	Don't Look Away	Web	Won	

== Design and Art Direction ==
Design and Art Direction is a British educational charity which exists to promote excellence in design and advertising.

Year	Nominated work	Award	Result	Ref.
2016	Don't Look Away	Advertising Music Video: Music Video	Won	
2022	Team Up For Excellence - The Film	Sound & Design Use of Music	Won	
2022	Team Up For Excellence - The Film	Direction	Won	

== DOC LA ==
The DOC LA is an international documentary film festival in Hollywood, California.

Year	Nominated work	Award	Result	Ref.
2018	Guilty Until Proven Guilty	DOC LA Icon Award	Won	

== Drum Design Awards ==
The Drum Design Awards is an annual award that recognise great design being produced by agencies globally and give you an opportunity to see your best design work rewarded.

Year	Nominated work	Award	Result	Ref.
2016	Don't Look Away	Website Design	Won	

== Ebony ==
The annual Ebony Power 100 list salutes the remarkable achievements of Black professionals, entertainers and civic leaders.

Year	Nominated work	Award	Result	Ref.
2022	Usher	Entertainment Powehouses	Won	

== ESPY Awards ==
The ESPY Awards are an annual ceremony presented that recognize individual and team athletic achievement and other sports-related performance during the calendar year preceding a given annual ceremony.

Year	Nominated work	Award	Result	Ref.
2016	Cleveland Cavaliers	Outstanding Team ESPY Award	Won	

== Eurobest European Advertising Festival ==
The Eurobest The European Festival of Creativity is an annual event which celebrates and rewards creative excellence in creative communications, advertising and related fields in Europe.

Year	Nominated work	Award	Result	Ref.
2016	Don't Look Away	Interactive	Silver	

== Ford Freedom Award Scholar ==
The Ford Freedom Awards is an annual event held in Detroit, Michigan.

Year	Nominee/Work	Award	Ref.
2010	Usher	Ford Freedom Scholar	

== Fragrance Foundation ==
The Fragrance Foundation is an annual event held in New York City since 1973.

Year	Nominee	Award	Ref.
2010	Usher	Fragrance Celebrity of the Year	

== Georgia Music Hall of Fame ==
The Georgia Music Hall of Fame program was established by the State of Georgia in 1979 to honor Georgia musicians who have made significant contributions to the music industry.

Year	Category	Ref.
2007	Performer	

== Glamour Awards ==
The Glamour Awards is hosted by Glamour magazine every year to hand out the Woman of the Year awards to honor extraordinary and inspirational women from a variety of fields, including entertainment, business, sports, music, science, medicine, education and politics. The awards started in 2003 and are hosted every May in the UK. From 2004, Glamour introduced the Man of the Year award, which Usher won in 2005.

Year	Recipient	Award	Result	Ref.
2005	Usher	Man of the Year	Won	

== Gordon Parks Foundation ==
The Gordon Parks Foundation is dedicated to preserving the work and legacy of Gordon Parks as well as other photographers, filmmakers and artists. Usher was honored at its 2015 annual awards dinner and auction.

Year	Nominee/Work	Award	Ref.
2015	Usher	Gordon Parks Award	

== Grammy Awards ==
The Grammy Awards are awarded annually by the National Academy of Recording Arts and Sciences of the United States for outstanding achievements in the music industry. Considered the highest music honor, the awards were established in 1958. Usher has won eight awards.

Year	Nominee / work	Award	Result	Ref.
1998	"You Make Me Wanna..."	Best Male R&B Vocal Performance	Nominated	
1999	"My Way"	Best Male R&B Vocal Performance	Nominated	
2002	"U Remind Me"	Best Male R&B Vocal Performance	Won	
2003	"U Don't Have to Call"	Best Male R&B Vocal Performance	Won	
2005	Confessions	Album of the Year	Nominated	
2005	Confessions	Best Contemporary R&B Album	Won	
2005	"Yeah!" (feat. Lil Jon and Ludacris)	Record of the Year	Nominated	
2005	"Yeah!" (feat. Lil Jon and Ludacris)	Best Rap/Sung Collaboration	Won	
2005	"Burn"	Best Male R&B Vocal Performance	Nominated	
2005	"Burn"	Best R&B Song	Nominated	
2005	"My Boo" (feat. Alicia Keys)	Best R&B Song	Nominated	
2005	"My Boo" (feat. Alicia Keys)	Best R&B Performance by a Duo or Group with Vocals	Won	
2006	"Superstar"	Best Male R&B Vocal Performance	Nominated	
2008	"Same Girl" (with R. Kelly)	Best R&B Performance By A Duo Or Group with Vocals	Nominated	
2009	"Here I Stand"	Best Male R&B Vocal Performance	Nominated	
2011	"There Goes My Baby"	Best Male R&B Vocal Performance	Won	
2011	Raymond V Raymond	Best Contemporary R&B Album	Won	
2013	"Climax"	Best R&B Performance	Won	
2015	"New Flame" (with Chris Brown & Rick Ross)	Best R&B Performance	Nominated	
2015	"New Flame" (with Chris Brown & Rick Ross)	Best R&B Song	Nominated	
2015	"Good Kisser"	Best R&B Song	Nominated	
2015	"Good Kisser"	Best R&B Performance	Nominated	
2023	Good Morning Gorgeous (as a feature artist)	Album of the Year	Nominated	
2025	Coming Home	Best R&B Album	Nominated	

== Guinness World Records ==
The Guinness World Records is a reference book published annually, listing world records and national records, both of human achievements and the extremes of the natural world.

Year	Nominee/Work	Record	Ref.
2004	Usher	Longest stay at No.1 on US Singles chart in a year	
2004	Usher	Most consecutive US Airplay chart No.1s	
2010	Usher	Most R&B no.1s in the US	

== Hollywood Life ==
Hollywood Life magazine hosts an annual Breakthrough of the Year award show; at its 5th annual show, Usher was awarded.

Year	Nominee/Work	Award	Ref.
2005	Usher	Breakthrough of the Year	

== Hollywood Walk of Fame ==
The Hollywood Walk of Fame is an internationally recognized Hollywood icon. The Hollywood Chamber of Commerce continues to add stars on the Walk of Fame as the representative of the City of Los Angeles.

Year	Nominee/Work	Award	Ref.
2016	Usher	Star on the Walk of Fame	

== Harlem Fashion Row Awards ==
Year	Nominee/Work	Award	Ref.
2025	Usher	Virgil Abloh Award	

== IFPI Hong Kong Top Sales Music Awards ==
The IFPIHKG Awards are held annually in Hong Kong to honor every year's best-selling artists. Usher has received one award.

Year	Nominee / work	Award	Result
2004	Confessions	Ten Best Sales Releases, Foreign	Won

== iHeartRadio Music Awards ==
The iHeartRadio Music Awards is a music awards show, founded by iHeartRadio in 2014, to recognize the most popular artists and music over the past year as determined by the network's listeners.

Year	Nominee / work	Award	Result	Ref.
2010	"Somebody to Love" (feat. Usher)	International Video of the Year	Won	
2015	"New Flame" (with Chris Brown and Rick Ross)	Hip Hop/R&B Song of the Year	Nominated	
2016	Usher	Biggest Triple Threat	Nominated	
2016	Usher	R&B Artist of the Year	Nominated	
2017	Usher	R&B Artist of the Year	Nominated	
2017	"No Limit" (with Young Thug)	R&B Song of the Year	Nominated	
2023	Usher: My Way – The Las Vegas Residency	Favorite Residency	Nominated	
2025	Usher	R&B Artist of the Year	Nominated	
2025	R&B Album of the Year	Coming Home	Won	
2025	Favorite Tour Style	Usher: Past Present Future	Nominated	
2025	Favorite Tour Tradition	Feeding cherries	Nominated	

== Interactive Advertising Bureau ==
The Internet Advertising Bureau (IAB) UK is the trade association and industry body for digital advertising. The IAB seek to support, grow and guide the online advertising industry.

Year	Nominated work	Award	Result	Ref.
2016	Don't Look Away	Best Digital Video Creative	Won	
2016	Don't Look Away	Most Buzz-Worthy Campaign	Won	

== International Dance Music Awards ==
The Winter Music Conference was established in 1985. It is a part of the Winter Music Conference, a weeklong electronic music event held annually.

Year	Nominated work	Award	Result	Ref.
1998	"You Make Me Wanna..."	Best R&B Track	Won	
2005	"Yeah!"	Best R&B/Urban Dance Track	Won	
2011	"OMG"	Best R&B/Urban Dance Track	Nominated	
2011	"DJ Got Us Falling In Love"	Best R&B/Urban Dance Track	Nominated	
2012	"Without You"	Best R&B/Urban Dance Track	Nominated	
2012	"Without You"	Best Commercial/Pop Dance Track	Nominated	
2013	"Scream"	Best R&B/Urban Dance Track	Nominated	

== International Design Awards ==
The International Design Awards are a group of awards that recognize, celebrate and promote design visionaries and emerging talent in architecture, interior, product, graphic and fashion design.

Year	Nominated work	Award	Result	Ref.
2016	Usher's Looking 4 Myself	Silver in Multimedia / Interactive Media	Silver	

== Juno Awards ==
The Juno Awards are presented annually to Canadian musical artists and bands to acknowledge their artistic and technical achievements in all aspects of music. New members of the Canadian Music Hall of Fame are also inducted as part of the awards ceremonies.

Year	Nominated work	Award	Result	Ref.
2005	Confessions	International Album of the Year	Nominated	

== Kora Awards ==
The Kora Awards are music awards given annually for musical achievement in sub-Saharan Africa.

Year	Nominee / work	Award	Result	Ref.
2004	Usher	Best Male Artist of Diaspora (USA)	Nominated	

== Latin American Music Awards ==
Year	Nominee / work	Award	Result	Ref.
2024	Dientes (with J Balvin)	Collaboration Crossover of the Year	Nominated	
2024	Himself	Best Crossover Artist	Nominated	

== Little Kids Rock ==
Little Kids Rock is an organization that partners with public school districts with the goal of ensuring that all students (K-12) have access to music education and its many benefits.

Year	Nominee/Work	Award	Ref.
2019	Usher	Honoree	

== Lo Nuestro Awards ==
Year	Nominated work	Award	Result	Ref.
2024	"Dientes"	Crossover Collaboration of the Year	Nominated	

== London International Awards ==
The London International Awards are a worldwide awards annually honoring excellence in advertising, digital media, production, design, music & sound and branded entertainment. It was the first international advertising award of its kind to acknowledge all media and methods from around the world to be judged by a diverse global jury

Year	Nominated work	Award	Result	Ref.
2016	Don't Look Away	Branded Content	Finalist	
2021	Rémy Martin 1738 Accord Royal - "Team Up For Excellence - The Film"	Music & Sound: Music Original - Score	Finalist	
2021	Rémy Martin 1738 Accord Royal - "Team Up For Excellence - The Film"	Branded Entertainment: Scripted Short Film	Bronze	
2021	Rémy Martin 1738 Accord Royal - "Team Up For Excellence - The Film"	Production & Post-Production: Production Design	Bronze	
2021	Rémy Martin 1738 Accord Royal - "Team Up For Excellence - The Film"	TV/Cinema: Beverages - Alcoholic	Silver	

== Make-A-Wish ==
Make-A-Wish is an organisation that arranges experiences described as "wishes" to children with life-threatening medical conditions. At its 2017 Wish Gala in Los Angeles, Usher was honored for his granting of 40 wishes to children through his long-time partnership.

Year	Nominated work	Award	Ref.
2017	Usher	Shining Star Award	

== Meteor Awards ==
A Meteor Ireland Music Award was an accolade bestowed upon professionals in the music industry in Ireland and further afield

Year	Nominated work	Award	Result	Ref.
2005	Usher	Best International Artist	Nominated	

== MIXX Awards ==
The MIXX Awards recognize and showcase great European digital research projects and the contribution they have made to the development of the digital advertising industry.

Year	Nominated work	Award	Result	Ref.
2016	Don't Look Away	Web Campaigns	Gold	
2016	Don't Look Away	Online Video	Gold	
2016	Don't Look Away	Best Use of Audio	Gold	
2016	Don't Look Away	Best Use of Digital & Interactive Screens	Silver	
2016	Don't Look Away	Best Use of Digital	Bronze	

== Mnet Asian Music Awards ==
The Mnet Asian Music Awards is one of the major K-pop music awarding ceremonies held annually by CJ E&M through its music channel Mnet, involving the participation of some of the most well-known actors and celebrities, not only in South Korea, but also in other countries such as China (including Taiwan and Hong Kong), Japan, Indonesia, Canada, Singapore and United States.

Year	Nominated work	Award	Result	Ref.
2004	"Yeah!"	Best International Artist	Won	

== Morehouse College ==
Morehouse College is a private, all-male, liberal arts, historically African American college located in Atlanta, Georgia. Its annual "A Candle in the Dark" Gala presents the Candle Award in honor of excellence in the arts, athletics, business, education, entertainment, government, law, medicine, the military, religion, and science and technology.

Year	Nominee/Work	Award	Ref.
2017	Usher	Candle Award (Philanthropy, Arts and Entertainment)	

== Music of Black Origin Awards, UK (MOBO) ==
The MOBO Awards (an acronym for Music of Black Origin) were established in 1996 by Kanya King. They are held annually in the United Kingdom to recognize artists of any race or nationality performing music of black origin.

Year	Nominated work	Award	Result	Ref.
2001	"Pop Ya Collar"	Best Video	Nominated	
2001	8701	Best Albums	Won	
2001	Usher	Best R&B Act	Won	
2002	Usher	Best R&B Act	Nominated	
2004	Usher	Best R&B Act	Won	
2004	"Yeah!"	Best Video	Nominated	
2004	"Yeah!"	Best Collaboration	Nominated	
2004	"Yeah!"	Best Ringtone	Nominated	
2004	"Burn"	Best Single	Nominated	
2004	Confessions	Best Album	Nominated	
2008	Here I Stand	Best Album	Nominated	
2008	Usher	Best R&B/Soul Act	Nominated	
2008	Usher	Best International Act	Nominated	
2010	Usher	Best International Act	Nominated	

== MTV Awards ==
=== MTV Asia Awards ===
Year	Nominated work	Award	Results	Ref.
2005	Usher	Favorite Male	Won	

=== MTV Australia Video Music Awards ===
Year	Nominated work	Award	Results	Ref.
2005	Usher	Best Male	Nominated	
2005	"Yeah!"	Best Dance Video	Won	

=== MTV Europe Music Awards ===
The MTV Europe Music Awards (EMA) were established in 1994 by MTV Networks Europe to celebrate the most popular music videos in Europe.

Year	Nominated work	Award	Result	Ref.
2004	Usher	Best Male Act	Won	
2004	Confessions	Best Album	Won	
2005	Usher	Best R&B Act	Nominated	
2010	Usher	Best Male Act	Nominated	
2010	Usher	Best Pop Act	Nominated	
2010	"OMG"	Best Song	Nominated	
2012	Usher	Best North American Act	Nominated	
2023	Usher	Best R&B Act	Nominated	
2024	Usher	Best R&B Act	Nominated	

=== MTV Platinum Video Plays Awards ===
Year	Nomination Work	Award	Result
2011	OMG	Platinum	Won
2011	DJ Got Us Fallin In Love	Gold	Won

=== MTV Video Music Awards ===
The MTV Video Music Awards were established in 1984 by MTV to celebrate the top music videos of the year.

Year	Nomination Work	Award	Result	Ref.
1998	"You Make Me Wanna"	Best R&B Video	Nominated	
2002	"U Got It Bad"	Best R&B Video	Nominated	
2002	"U Got It Bad"	Best Male Video	Nominated	
2002	"U Don't Have to Call"	Best Choreography in a Video	Nominated	
2004	"Yeah!"	Best Male Video	Won	
2004	"Yeah!"	Best Dance Video	Won	
2004	"Yeah!"	Video of the Year	Nominated	
2004	"Yeah!"	Best Choreography in a Video	Nominated	
2004	"Burn"	Best R&B Video	Nominated	
2005	"My Boo"	Best R&B Video	Nominated	
2005	"Caught Up"	Best Male Video	Nominated	
2008	"Love in This Club"	Best Male Video	Nominated	
2010	"OMG"	Best Male Video	Nominated	
2010	"OMG"	Best Dance Video	Nominated	
2010	"OMG"	Best Choreography	Nominated	
2012	"Climax"	Best Male Video	Nominated	
2014	"Good Kisser"	Best Choreography	Nominated	
2024	"Good Good"	Best R&B	Nominated	

=== MTV Video Music Awards Japan ===
Year	Nomination Work	Award	Result	Ref.
2002	Usher	Best R&B Act	Nominated	
2005	Confessions	Album of the Year	Nominated	
2005	"Yeah!"	Video of the Year	Nominated	
2005	"Yeah!"	Best Male Video	Nominated	
2005	"Burn"	Best R&B Video	Nominated	
2005	"My Boo"	Best Collaboration Video	Nominated	
2011	"OMG"	Best R&B Video	Nominated	

=== TRL Awards ===
Year	Nominated work	Award	Result	Ref.
2005	Usher	Best Male Artist	Won	
2005	"Yeah!"	Rock The Mic (Best Performance)	Nominated	

== MuchMusic Video Awards ==
The MuchMusic Video Awards is an annual awards ceremony presented by the Canadian music video channel MuchMusic.

Year	Nominated work	Award	Result	Ref.
2002	"U Don't Have to Call"	Best International Video - Artist	Nominated	
2004	"Yeah!"	Favorite International Artist	Won	
2004	"Yeah!"	Best International Artists Video	Nominated	
2005	"Caught Up"	Favorite International Artists	Nominated	
2005	"Caught Up"	Best International Artists Video	Won	
2008	"Love in This Club"	Best International Artists Video	Nominated	
2011	"Somebody to Love (remix)"(with Justin Bieber)	International Video of the Year by a Canadian	Won	
2011	"Somebody to Love (remix)"(with Justin Bieber)	UR Fave Artist	Won	
2011	"DJ Got Us Fallin' in Love"	Most Watched Video	Nominated	

== NAACP Image Awards ==
The NAACP Image Awards is an award presented annually by the American National Association for the Advancement of Colored People to honor outstanding people of color in film, television, music and literature.

Year	Nominated work	Award	Result	Ref.
1999	Usher	Outstanding Actor in a Daytime Drama Series (for a guest or recurring role)	Nominated	
2003	"U Don't Have to Call"	Outstanding Music Video	Nominated	
2005	Confessions	Outstanding Album	Nominated	
2005	'Yeah!"	Outstanding Song	Nominated	
2005	'Yeah!"	Outstanding Music Video	Nominated	
2005	"My Boo"	Outstanding Music Video	Nominated	
2005	Usher	Outstanding Male Artists	Won	
2011	Raymond V Raymond	Outstanding Album	Nominated	
2011	Usher	Outstanding Male Artists	Won	
2013	Usher	Outstanding Male Artists	Won	
2015	"Good Kisser"	Outstanding Song	Nominated	
2023	"Good Love" (with City Girls)	Outstanding Duo, Group or Collaboration (Contemporary)	Nominated	
2024	Usher	Entertainer of the Year	Won	
2024	Usher	President's Award	Won	
2024	Usher	Outstanding Male Artist	Won	
2024	"Good Good" (with Summer Walker & 21 Savage)	Outstanding Duo, Group or Collaboration (Contemporary)	Nominated	
2024	"Good Good" (with Summer Walker & 21 Savage)	Outstanding Soul/R&B Song	Nominated	
2024	"Boyfriend"	Outstanding Music Video/Visual Album	Nominated	

== Nantucket Film Festival ==
The Nantucket Film Festival is a film festival founded in 1996 which focuses on screenwriting.

Year	Nominated work	Award	Result	Ref.
2018	Burden	Best Narrative	Won	

== National Civil Rights Museum ==
The Freedom Award established in 1991 is an annual event for the National Civil Rights Museum. The Freedom Award honors individuals who have made significant contributions in civil rights and who have laid the foundation for present and future leaders in the battle for human rights.

Year	Nominee/Work	Award	Ref.
2011	Usher	Freedom Award	

== NBA ==
The NBA (National Basketball Association) is the pre-eminent men's professional basketball league in North America. As part owner of the Cleveland Cavaliers, Usher received credit to their win of the NBA Finals at the end of the 2015–16 season for being a part owner of the team .

Year	Team	Award	Ref.
2016	Cleveland Cavaliers	Larry O'Brien Trophy (NBA Championship)	

== New York Festival ==
The New York Festival Advertising Award is an annual event for those working in advertising.

Year	Nominated work	Award	Result	Ref.
2013	Unsung Presents Usher	2013 Finalist Certificate Winner	Won	
2016	Don't Look Away	Best Use of Music	Finalist	
2016	Don't Look Away	Use of New Technology	Bronze	
2016	Don't Look Away	Public Service Announcements	Bronze	
2016	Don't Look Away	Activation and Engagement - Promotion of Peace and Human Rights	Bronze	
2016	Don't Look Away	Digital/Interactive - Websites and Social Media - Promotion of Peace and Human Rights	Bronze	

== New York Film Critics Online ==
The New York Film Critics Online (NYFCO) is an organization founded by Harvey Karten in 2000 composed of Internet film critics based in New York City. The group meets once a year, in December, for voting on its annual NYFCO Awards.

Year	Nominee/Work	Award	Ref.
2010	Hustlers	Top 10 Films	

== Nickelodeon Kids' Choice Awards ==
The Nickelodeon Kids' Choice Awards were established in 1988 and is an annual awards show that honors the year's biggest television, film and music acts, as voted by the people who watch the Nickelodeon cable channel.

Year	Nominated work	Award	Result	Ref.
1999	Usher	Favorite Singer	Nominated	
2002	Usher	Favorite Male Singer	Won	
2005	Usher	Favorite Male Singer	Won	
2005	"Burn"	Favorite Song	Won	
2005	"My Boo"	Favorite Song	Nominated	
2011	Usher	Favorite Male Singer	Nominated	
2012	Usher	Favorite Male Singer	Nominated	
2013	Usher	Favorite Male Singer	Nominated	
2024	Usher	Favorite Male Singer	Nominated	

== NRJ Music Awards (France) ==
A major award ceremony that takes place in Cannes, France.

Year	Nominated work	Award	Results	Ref.
2002	Usher	International New Artist of the Year	Nominated	
2003	"I Need a Girl (Part One)"	Best Collaboration	Nominated	
2005	"Yeah!"	International Song of the Year	Nominated	
2005	Confessions	International Album of the Year	Nominated	
2005	"My Boo"	Best Collaboration	Nominated	
2005	Usher	International Male Artists Of The Year	Won	
2011	"DJ Got Us Fallin' in Love"	Hit Of The Year	Nominated	
2011	Usher	International Male Artists Of The Year	Won	
2012	David Guetta & Usher	International Group/Duo of the Year	Nominated	

== One Show Awards ==
The One Show Awards is an awards show recognizing the best creative work in advertising, interactive, design and branded entertainment.

Year	Nominated work	Award	Result	Ref.
2016	Don't Look Away	Innovation in Film	Silver	
2016	Don't Look Away	CSR Web	Gold	
2016	Don't Look Away	Interactive: Corporate Social Responsibility	Merit	
2016	Don't Look Away	Music Video Digital	Bronze	
2022	Team Up For Excellence - The Film	Moving Image Craft: Production Design	Silver	
2022	Team Up For Excellence - The Film	Artist / Brand Collaboration	Merit	
2022	Team Up For Excellence - The Film	Online Films & Video	Merit	
2022	Team Up For Excellence - The Film	Direction / Single	Merit	
2022	Team Up For Excellence - The Film	Cinema Advertising	Merit	

== Ozone Awards ==
Ozone is an American magazine focused on the hip hop music of the Southern United States. The first annual Ozone Awards were held on August 6, 2006.

Year	Nominee / work	Award	Result	Ref.
2008	"Love in This Club"	Best Rap/R&B Collaboration	Won	

== Pensado Awards ==
The Dave Pensado Awards is an annual awards held in Los Angeles, California.

Year	Nominated work	Award	Result	Ref.
2015	Usher's New Look	Educator Award	Won	

== People Choice Awards, USA ==
The People's Choice Awards is an annual awards show recognizing the people and the work of popular culture.

Year	Nominated work	Award	Results	Ref.
2005	Usher	Favorite Male Performer	Won	
2005	"Yeah!" (with Ludacris & Lil Jon)	Best Combined Forces	Won	
2006	Usher	Favorite Male Performer	Nominated	
2010	Usher	Favorite R&B Artist	Nominated	
2011	Usher	Favorite R&B Artist	Won	
2011	Usher	Favorite Male Artists	Nominated	
2011	"OMG" (with will.i.am)	Favorite Song	Nominated	
2012	Usher	Favorite Tour Headliner	Nominated	
2013	Usher	Favorite Male Artist	Nominated	
2013	Usher	Favorite R&B Artist	Nominated	
2015	Usher	Favorite R&B Artist	Nominated	
2017	Usher	Favorite R&B Artist	Nominated	
2024	Usher	The R&B Artist of the Year	Nominated	

== Piaf Awards ==
The Piaf Awards is a part of an annual the festival every year in the spring.

Year	Nominated work	Award	Result	Ref.
2016	Don't Look Away	Creative Use of Technologies	Silver	
2016	Don't Look Away	Audience Engagement	Gold	

== Pitchfork Magazine ==
Year	Nominee/Work	Award	Result	Ref.
2019	Climax	The 200 Best Songs of the 2010s	#117	

== Premios Juventud ==
Premios Juventud is an awards show for Spanish-speaking celebrities in the areas of film, music, sports, fashion, and pop culture, presented by the television network Univision.

Year	Nominee/Work	Award	Result	Ref.
2012	"Promise" (with Romeo Santos)	La Combinación Perfecta (The Perfect Combo)	Won	
2012	"Promise" (with Romeo Santos)	La Más Pegajosa (Catchiest Tune)	Nominated	
2012	"Promise" (with Romeo Santos)	Canción Corta-venas (Heart-Wrenching Song)	Nominated	
2012	"Promise" (with Romeo Santos)	Mi Ringtone (My Ringtone)	Nominated	
2012	"Promise" (with Romeo Santos)	Mi Video Favorito (My Favorite Video)	Nominated	
2013	Usher	Favorite Hitmarker	Nominated	

== President's Volunteer Service Award ==
The President's Volunteer Service Award is a civil award bestowed by the President of the United States. In 2017, Atlanta Mayor Kasim Reed presented Usher with the Points of Light President's Lifetime Achievement Service Volunteer Award, on behalf of President Barack Obama, for his work with his foundation, Usher's New Look since 1999.

Year	Nominee	Award	Ref.
2017	Usher Raymond IV	Points of Light President's Lifetime Achievement Service Volunteer Award	

== Primetime Creative Arts Emmy Awards ==
Year	Nominated work	Award	Result	Ref.
2024	The Apple Music Super Bowl LVIII Halftime Show Starring Usher	Outstanding Variety Special (Live)	Nominated	

== PTTOW! ==
PTTOW! (Plan To Take Over the World) is an invite-only community for some of the most influential minds in business, entertainment, sports and culture. At the 2017 summit held on April 12 at Terranea Resort, Rancho Palos Verdes, CA, Usher received an Icon Award to recognize his major impact as a global music artist and cultural leader.

Year	Nominee/Work	Award	Ref.
2017	Usher	Icon Award	

== Radio Disney Music Awards ==
The Radio Disney Music Awards is an annual awards show which is operated and governed by Radio Disney, an American radio network.

Year	Nominee / work	Award	Result	Ref.
2004	Usher	Best Male Artist	Won	

== Radio Music Awards, USA ==
Radio Music Awards is an annual U.S. award show that honored the year's most successful songs on mainstream radio. Nominations were based on the amount of airplay recording artists receive on radio stations in various formats using chart information compiled by Mediabase.

Year	Nominated work	Award	Result	Ref.
2004	Usher	Artists Of The Year- Hip-Hop/ Rhythmic Radio	Won	
2004	Usher	Cingular Artists Of The Year	Won	
2004	"Yeah!"	Song Of The Year- Hip-Hop/Rhythmic Radio	Won	
2005	Usher	Artist of the Year/Urban and Rhythmic Radio	Nominated	
2005	Usher	Artist of the Year/ Mainstream Hit Radio	Nominated	
2005	"Lovers and Friends" (with Lil Jon & Ludacris)	Song of the Year/Urban and Rhythmic Radio	Nominated	

== Recording Academy ==
The Recording Academy is a U.S. organization of musicians, producers, recording engineers and other recording professionals. The Atlanta chapter of the academy presents honours annually.

Year	Nominated work	Award	Ref.
2005	Usher	Atlanta Heroes Award	

== Record of the Year Awards ==
The Record of the Year Awards was an award voted by the UK public. For many years it was given in conjunction with television programmes of the same name.

Year	Performance	Award	Result	Ref.
2010	"OMG" (featuring Will.I.Am)	Record of the Year	Nominated	

== RTHK International Pop Poll Awards ==
The RTHK International Pop Poll Awards is an annual award show in Hong Kong that honors the best in international and national music.

Year	Nominated work	Award	Result	Ref.
2011	Usher	Top Male Artist	Nominated	
2011	"OMG" (featuring Will.I.Am)	Top Ten International Gold Songs	Won	
2012	"Without You" (with David Guetta)	Top Ten International Gold Songs	Nominated	
2013	Usher	Top Male Artist	Nominated	

== Saturn Awards ==
The Saturn Award is an American award presented annually by the Academy of Science Fiction, Fantasy and Horror Films; it was initially created to honor science fiction, fantasy, and horror on film, but has since grown to reward other films belonging to genre fiction, as well as on television and home media releases.

Year	Nominated work	Award	Ref.
1999	The Faculty	Best Horror Film	

== SESAC Pop Awards ==
SESAC Pop Awards honors its members in an annual awards shows.

Year	Nominated work	Award	Ref.
2012	"Without You" (with Usher)	Pop Award Winners	
2012	"There Goes My Baby"	Pop Award Winners	
2015	"Touch 'N You" (with Usher)	Pop Award Winners	
2016	"The Matrimony" (with Usher)	Pop Award Winners	
2022	"Don't Waste My Time" (with Ella Mai)	Pop Award Winners	

== Smash Hits Poll Winners Party ==
The Smash Hits Poll Winners Party was an awards ceremony which ran from 1979 (as the Smash Hits Readers' Poll) to 2005. Each award winner was voted by readers of the Smash Hits magazine.

Year	Nominated work	Award	Result	Ref.
2005	Usher	Top Male	Won	
2005	Usher	Best R&B Act	Won	

== SoundExchange ==
SoundExchange is an American non-profit collective rights management organization founded in 2003. It is the sole organization designated by the U.S. Congress to collect and distribute digital performance royalties for sound recordings.

Year	Category	Ref.
2023	Hall of Fame	

== Southern Museum of Music ==
The Southern Museum of Music was established to honor and preserve the contributions of musicians whose roots originated in the southern United States.

Year	Category	Ref.
2015	Hall of Fame	

== State honors ==
The key to the city and days give given as an honor to esteemed individuals, such as celebrities or dignitaries, to signify their importance to the city.

Year	Recipient	Category	Ref.
1998	Usher	Key to the City of New Orleans, Louisiana	
2023	Usher	Key to the City of Las Vegas, Nevada	
2023	Usher	Usher Raymond Day, Las Vegas (October 17)	
2024	Usher	Phoenix Award, Atlanta, Georgia	
2024	Usher	Usher Day, Fulton, County, Georgia (February 14)	
2024	Usher	Usher Raymond Day, Chattanooga, Tennessee (April 20)	
2024	Usher	BEC Chattanooga Icon Award	
2024	Usher	Key to the City of Chattanooga, Tennessee	

== Soul Train Music Awards, USA ==
The Soul Train Music Awards is an annual award show aired in national broadcast syndication that honors the best in African American music and entertainment established in 1987.

Year	Nominated work	Award	Results	Ref.
1998	"You Make Me Wanna"	Best R&B/Soul Single	Won	
2002	8701	Male R&B/Soul Album	Won	
2002	"U Got It Bad"	Best R&B/Soul Single, Male	Nominated	
2003	"U Don't Have to Call"	Best R&B/Soul Single, Male	Nominated	
2005
2005	"Yeah!"	The Michael Jackson Award for Best R&B/Soul or Rap Music Video	Nominated	
2005	"Yeah!"	Best R&B/Soul or Rap Dance Cut	Won	
2005	"My Boo"	Best R&B/Soul Single, Group, Band or Duo	Won	
2005	"Confessions Part II"	Best R&B/Soul Single, Male	Won	
2005	Confessions	Best R&B/Soul Album, Male	Won	
2005	Usher	Entertainer Of The Year	Won	
2010	"There Goes My Baby"	Song Of The Year	Nominated	
2010	"OMG"	Best Dance Performance	Nominated	
2010	Raymond V Raymond	Album Of The Year	Won	
2010	Usher	Best R&B/Soul Artist Male	Won	
2012	Looking 4 Myself	Album of the Year	Nominated	
2012	"Scream"	Best Dance Performance	Nominated	
2012	Usher	Best R&B/Soul Male Artist	Nominated	
2012	"Climax"	Song of the Year	Nominated	
2012	"Climax"	The Ashford & Simpson Songwriter's Award	Nominated	
2014
2014	New Flame (with Chris Brown & Rick Ross)	Best Collaboration	Nominated	
2014	New Flame (with Chris Brown & Rick Ross)	Video of the Year	Nominated	
2014	"Good Kisser"	Video of the Year	Nominated	
2014	"Good Kisser"	Best Dance Performance	Nominated	
2016	"No Limit" (with Young Thug)	Best Dance Performance	Nominated	
2016	Usher	Best R&B/Soul Male Artist	Nominated	
2017	"Party" (with Chris Brown & Gucci Mane)	Video of the Year	Nominated	
2017	"Party" (with Chris Brown & Gucci Mane)	Best Dance Performance	Nominated	
2020
2020	"Don't Waste My Time" (feat Ella Mai)	Best Collaboration	Nominated	
2020	"Don't Waste My Time" (feat Ella Mai)	Song of the Year	Nominated	
2020	"Come Thru"	Song of the Year	Nominated	
2020	"Come Thru"	Best Collaboration	Nominated	
2020	Usher	Best R&B/Soul Male Artist	Nominated	
2021	Usher	Best R&B/Soul Male Artist	Nominated	
2021	Bad Habits"	Best Dance Performance	Nominated	
2023	"Boyfriend"	Best Dance Performance	Nominated	
2023	"Good Good" (with Summer Walker & 21 Savage)	Best Dance Performance	Nominated	
2023	"Good Good" (with Summer Walker & 21 Savage)	Best Collaboration	Won	
2023	"Good Good" (with Summer Walker & 21 Savage)	Song of the Year	Nominated	
2023	"Good Good" (with Summer Walker & 21 Savage)	The Ashford & Simpson Songwriter's Award	Nominated	
2023	"Good Good" (with Summer Walker & 21 Savage)	Video of the Year	Nominated	
2023	"Boyfriend"	Video of the Year	Nominated	
2023	Usher	Best R&B/Soul Male Artist	Won	
2023	Usher	Soul Train Certified Award	Won	

== Sundance Film Festival ==
The Sundance Film Festival is the largest annual independent film festival in the United States.

Year	Nominated work	Award	Result	Ref.
2018	Burden	U.S. Dramatic Audience Award	Won	

== Teen Choice Awards ==
The Teen Choice Awards is an annual awards show that airs on the Fox television network. The awards honor the year's biggest achievements in music, film, sports, television, fashion, and more, voted by viewers aged 11 to 20.

Year	Nominee / work	Award	Result	Ref.
1999	"Nice & Slow"	Single of the Year	Nominated	
1999	She's All That	Choice Movie: Comedy	Nominated	
2001	"U Remind Me"	Choice Summer Song	Nominated	
2002	8701	Choice Album	Nominated	
2002	"U Got It Bad"	Choice Love Song	Won	
2002	"U Don't Have To Call"	Choice Single	Nominated	
2002	"I Need a Girl (Part One)" (with Diddy & Loon)	Choice Hook Up	Nominated	
2002	Usher	Choice R&B/Hip-Hop/Rap Artist	Won	
2002	Usher	Choice Male Artist	Nominated	
2002	Usher	Choice Male Hottie	Nominated	
2003	Usher	Choice Male Hottie	Nominated	
2003	Usher	Choice R&B/Hip-Hop/Rap Artist	Nominated	
2003	Usher	Choice Male Fashion icon	Nominated	
2004	"Yeah!"	Choice R&B track	Won	
2004	"Yeah!"	Choice Best hook-up	Won	
2004	Confessions	Choice Album	Won	
2004	Usher	Choice R&B Artist	Won	
2005	Usher	Choice R&B Artist	Nominated	
2005	Usher	Choice Male Hottie	Nominated	
2005	Usher	Choice Red Carpet Fashion Icon - Male	Nominated	
2005	"Caught Up"	Choice Music: R&B/Hip-Hop Track	Nominated	
2005	"Caught Up"	Choice Music: Party Starter	Nominated	
2005	"Lovers and Friends" (with Lil Jon & Ludacris)	Choice Music: Rap Track	Nominated	
2008	Usher	Choice R&B Artist	Nominated	
2008	Usher	Choice Male Artist	Nominated	
2010	Usher	Choice Male Artist	Nominated	
2010	Usher	Choice R&B Artist	Nominated	
2010	Raymond v. Raymond	Choice R&B Album	Nominated	
2010	"OMG"	Choice R&B track	Won	
2012	Usher	Choice Summer Music Star: Male	Nominated	
2012	"Climax"	Choice Break-Up Song	Nominated	
2012	"Scream"	Choice Summer Song	Nominated	
2012	"Without You"	Choice R&B/Hip-hop Song	Nominated	

== Telecom Mobile Music Awards ==
The Telecom Mobile Music Awards New Zealand were presented to international and local record labels for the top 20 songs that Telecom mobile users have downloaded as either a ringtone or caller tune starting 2005.

Year	Nominated work	Category	Result	Ref
2005	"Caught Up"	Gold Award	Won	

== Time Magazine ==
Year	Nominated work	Award	Result	Ref.
2004	"Yeah" (with Ludacris & Lil Jon)	Best Song of 2004	#1	
2004	Confessions	Best Album(s) of 2004	Won	

== The Source Music Awards ==
Year	Nominated work	Award	Result	Ref.
2004	Usher	R&B Artist of the Year	Won	
2004	Yeah	R&B/Rap Collaboration of The Year	Won	

== TMF Awards (Netherlands) ==
The TMF Awards were annual public prices of TMF for musicians.

Year	Nominated work	Award	Result	Ref.
2005	Usher	Beste Mannelijke	Won	
2005	Usher	Internationaal/Beste Urban	Nominated	
2005	Usher & Alicia Keys	Internationaal/Beste Videoclip	Nominated	

== Vevo Certified Awards ==
Vevo Certified Award honors artists with over 100 million views on Vevo and its partners (including YouTube) through special features on the Vevo website. It was launched in June 2012.

Year	Nominee/Work	Certified videos	Ref.
2019	Usher	14	
As of June 20, 2019

== VH1 Big in '04 Awards ==
VH1 Big in '04 was the 2004 annual award show that aired on December 1, 2004, in the United States.

Year	Nominee/Work	Award	Ref.
2004	Usher	Big Musical Artist	

== Vibe Awards ==
Vibe magazine produced and aired its annual Vibe Awards show in 2003 on UPN until 2006. It was then aired on VH1 Soul in 2007.

Year	Nominee / work	Award	Result	Ref.
2004	Usher	R&B Voice of the Year	Won	
2004	Usher	Artist of the Year	Nominated	
2004	"Yeah!"	Club-Banger of the Year	Nominated	
2004	"Yeah!"	Coolest Collabo	Nominated	
2004	"Confessions Part II"	R&B Song of the Year	Nominated	

== Washington West Film Festival ==
Washington West Film Festival is a film festival founded in 2011 by Brad Russell.

Year	Nominated work	Award	Result	Ref.
2019	Burden	Jury Award Best Feature Narrative	Won	

== Webby Awards ==
The Webby Awards are awards for excellence on the Internet presented annually by The International Academy of Digital Arts and Sciences, a judging body composed of over two thousand industry experts and technology innovators.

Year	Nominee/Work	Award	Result	Ref.
2013	Unstaged Presents Usher: Take The Stage	Online Film & Video	Won	
2013	Unstaged Presents Usher: Take The Stage	Advertising & Media	Nominated	
2014	Usher: Looking 4 Myself	Advertising & Media: Consumer Electronics & Services	Nominated	

== WPPed Cream ==
The WPPed Cream Awards were initiated in 2007 to recognise the very best work produced by WPP companies around the world, across all marketing disciplines.

Year	Nominated work	Award	Result	Ref.
2016	Don't Look Away	Digital	Won	
2016	Don't Look Away	Adverstising	Won	

== World Music Awards ==
The World Music Awards were established in 1989 and is an international awards show that annually honors musicians based on their worldwide sales figures, which are provided by the International Federation of the Phonographic Industry.

Year	Nominee / work	Award	Result	Ref.
2004	Usher	World's Best Male Artist	Won	
2004	Usher	World's Best Pop Male Artist	Won	
2004	Usher	World's Best R&B Male Artist	Won	
2005	Usher	World's Best Male Artist	Won	
2005	Usher	World's Best Pop Male Artist	Nominated	
2005	Usher	World's Best Selling R&B Artist	Nominated	
2008	Usher	World's Best Selling R&B Artist	Nominated	
2014	Usher	World's Best Entertainer of the Year	Nominated	
2014	Usher	World's Best Male Artist	Nominated	
2014	Usher	World's Best Live Act	Nominated	
2014	Looking 4 Myself	World's Best Album	Nominated	
2014	"Scream"	World's Best Song	Nominated	
2014	"Scream"	World's Best Video	Nominated	

== Young Hollywood Awards ==
The Young Hollywood Awards is an award presented annually which honors the year's biggest achievements in pop music, movies, sports, television, fashion and more, as voted on by teenagers aged 13–19 and young adults.

Year	Nominee / work	Award	Result	Ref.
2001	Usher	One to Watch - Male	Won	
