= U Remind Me =

2001 single by Usher

Single by Usher

from the album 8701
- Released: May 22, 2001
- Studio: Tree Sound (Norcross, Georgia)
- Genre: R&B
- Length: 4:27
- Label: Arista
- Songwriters: Anita McCloud; Edmund Clement
- Producers: Edmund Clement; Jimmy Jam & Terry Lewis

Usher singles chronology
"Pop Ya Collar" (2000)	"U Remind Me" (2001)	"U Got It Bad" (2001)

Music video
- "U Remind Me" on YouTube

"U Remind Me" is a song by American singer Usher. It was written by Edmund "Eddie Hustle" Clement and Anita McCloud and produced by Clement along with duo Jimmy Jam & Terry Lewis for Usher's third studio album 8701 (2001). A mid-tempo R&B track, the song is about a man who meets a woman who seems like a nice catch, but he decides not to enter a relationship with her because she looks too much like an ex-girlfriend with whom he had a bad breakup.

The song served as the lead American single from 8701 following the release of previous single "Pop Ya Collar", which was only included in some editions of the album. "U Remind Me" topped the US Billboard Hot 100 on July 7, 2001, and also reached the top five in Australia, Belgium, France, the Netherlands, New Zealand, and the United Kingdom. The song won Usher his first Grammy Award for Best Male R&B Vocal Performance in 2002. Its accompanying music video features Usher's then-girlfriend Chilli of TLC as one of the female leads. There is also a remix that features Method Man and Blu Cantrell.

== Background ==
"U Remind Me" was originally produced by Edmund "Eddie Hustle" Clement, co-written by his sister Anita McCloud and planned to be recorded by Clement's Hustle Child at one time or another. When his manager Mark Pitts, then vice president of A&R at Arista Records, began shopping their demo of the song, it fell into the hand of L.A. Reid who thought it would be an excellent song for Usher's third studio album. While Clement acknowledged that it was "tough to let the song go," Reid guaranteed them the song would be selected as the album's first single from 8701, and sent the track to Jimmy Jam & Terry Lewis to revamp parts of it. In an interview with MTV News, Jimmy Jam commented: "It wound up being the perfect song for Usher. The beat and all that was already cool. All we did was try to bring the vocal up to par. I wanted people to hear Usher sing and go, 'This boy can sing. He's a singer.' We already know he can dance, and he's got the style and that whole thing. But I want people to just go, 'He can sing'."

== Composition ==
"U Remind Me" is a contemporary R&B song written in the key of G♭ major, and is set in common time with a moderate tempo of 92 beats per minute. The song follows the chord progression of E♭m_{7}-A♭m_{7}-B♭m_{7}, and the piano ranges from the low note of E♭_{2} to the high note of A♭_{5}, while Usher's vocal range stretches from B♭_{2} to A♭_{5}. The song's lyrics are based on meeting a woman who reminds the singer of an ex-girlfriend, and therefore cannot comfortably date her.

== Critical reception ==
"U Remind Me" earned largely positive reviews form music critics. Billboard called the song a "return to form" for Usher, further describing it as a "laid-back, catchy summertime head-nodder. Trading his trademark quick-fire rap/sung delivery for some straight-up riffing and singing, this should earn Usher respect at R&B radio and beyond, helping him keep step with the no-frills old school production that." Sal Cinquemani from Slant called the song a "smash" with an" "instantly recognizable hook and admirable exploration of a conflicted emotional terrain." James Poletti of Yahoo! Music noted the song as the best track on 8701, dubbing it the 2001 version of Craig David's "Fill Me In". Allmusic's Stephen Thomas Erlewine also chose it as a highlight from its parent album. NME called "U Remind Me" not "the most obvious follow-up to the storming "Pop Ya Colla," but you've got to give this one time to digest. Not quite a ballad, "U Remind Me" [...] is an intriguing tale about how, despite your obvious gorgeousness, Usher can't roll with you cos he's still suffering from a visit from the ghost of the ex."

"U Remind Me" gained Usher his first Grammy Award, winning the category of Best Male R&B Vocal Performance at the 44th annual ceremony. Other nominees for the award were Case's "Missing You", Maxwell's "Lifetime", Brian McKnight's "Love of My Life" and Musiq Soulchild's "Love". In 2010, Boonsri Dickinson of AOL Radio ranked "U Remind Me" as Usher's ninth-best song. In 2016, Complex ranked the song number six on their list of the 25 greatest Usher songs, and in 2021, American Songwriter ranked the song number seven on their list of the 10 greatest Usher songs.

== Music video ==
A music video for "U Remind Me" was directed by Dave Meyers and filmed in Los Angeles in April 2001. The video features look-a-likes for singers Mýa, Brandy, and Tamia (actress Natashia Williams), while featuring the real Rozonda "Chilli" Thomas of girl group TLC at the end to show the theme of the women reminding him of his past relationships. While subsequent videos for 8701 further singles were filmed by director Little X, the story in "U Remind Me" would be continued in "U Got It Bad" and "U Don't Have to Call," with Thomas reprising her role in both videos. The music video on YouTube has received over 100 million views as of May 2024.

== Track listings ==
US CD single

1. "U Remind Me" (radio edit) – 4:08
2. "U Remind Me" (instrumental) – 4:26
3. Snippets from 8701

US 12-inch single 1

A1. "U Remind Me" (Illicit club mix) – 7:27
A2. "U Remind Me" (Illicit acappella) – 4:44
B1. "U Remind Me" (Pete & Vincent's club mix) – 6:44
B2. "U Remind Me" (Pete & Vincent's dub mix) – 5:27

US 12-inch single 2

A1. "U Remind Me" (remix featuring Method Man and Blu Cantrell—radio mix) – 3:56
A2. "U Remind Me" (album version) – 4:27
B1. "U Remind Me" (club mix) – 3:55
B2. "U Remind Me" (instrumental) – 3:56
B3. "U Remind Me" (club mix acappella) – 3:39

European CD single and UK cassette single

1. "U Remind Me" (radio edit) – 4:27
2. "I Don't Know" (featuring P. Diddy) – 4:27

UK CD single

1. "U Remind Me" (radio edit) – 4:27
2. "I Don't Know" (featuring P. Diddy) – 4:27
3. "TTP" – 3:38
4. "U Remind Me" (video)

UK 12-inch single

1. "U Remind Me" (radio edit) – 4:27
2. "I Don't Know" (featuring P. Diddy) – 4:27
3. "TTP" – 3:38

Australian CD single

1. "U Remind Me" (radio edit) – 4:27
2. "U Remind Me" (instrumental) – 4:26
3. "I Don't Know" (featuring P. Diddy) – 4:27
4. "TTP" – 3:38

== Credits and personnel ==
Credits are lifted from the European CD single liner notes.

Studio

- Recorded at Tree Sound Studios (Norcross, Georgia, US)

Personnel

- Anita McCloud – writing
- Edmund "Eddie Hustle" Clement – writing (as Edmund Clement), production
- Usher – vocals
- Jimmy Jam & Terry Lewis – production
- John Frye – recording
- Mark Rains – recording, Pro Tools
- Warren Bletcher – recording assistant
- Brad Todd – recording assistant
- Kevin "KD" Davis – mixing
- Steve Baughman – mixing assistant
- Gravillis Inc. – art direction
- DL Warfield – art direction
- Courtney Walter – artwork design
- Christian Lantry – photography
- Eric Archibald – styling

== Charts ==
=== Weekly charts ===
Weekly chart performance for "U Remind Me"
Chart (2001)	Peak position
Australia (ARIA)	4
Australian Urban (ARIA)	2
Belgium (Ultratop 50 Flanders)	16
Belgium (Ultratop 50 Wallonia)	3
Canada (Nielsen SoundScan)	3
Canada CHR (Nielsen BDS)	4
Denmark (Tracklisten)	6
Europe (Eurochart Hot 100)	6
France (SNEP)	3
Germany (GfK)	21
Ireland (IRMA)	25
Italy (FIMI)	50
Netherlands (Dutch Top 40)	3
Netherlands (Single Top 100)	4
New Zealand (Recorded Music NZ)	3
Norway (VG-lista)	6
Scottish Singles Sales (Official Charts)	13
Sweden (Sverigetopplistan)	12
Switzerland (Schweizer Hitparade)	22
UK Singles (Official Charts)	3
UK Dance (Official Charts)	5
UK Hip Hop/R&B (Official Charts)	2
US Billboard Hot 100	1
US Dance Club Songs (Billboard)	41
US Dance Singles Sales (Billboard)	10
US Hot R&B/Hip-Hop Songs (Billboard)	1
US Pop Airplay (Billboard)	6
US Rhythmic Airplay (Billboard)	2

=== Year-end charts ===
Year-end chart performance for "U Remind Me"
Chart (2001)	Position
Australia (ARIA)	47
Belgium (Ultratop 50 Wallonia)	38
Canada (Nielsen SoundScan)	52
Europe (Eurochart Hot 100)	48
France (SNEP)	36
Netherlands (Dutch Top 40)	41
Netherlands (Single Top 100)	53
New Zealand (RIANZ)	30
Sweden (Hitlistan)	70
Switzerland (Schweizer Hitparade)	66
UK Singles (OCC)	65
UK Urban (Music Week)	12
US Billboard Hot 100	15
US Hot R&B/Hip-Hop Singles & Tracks (Billboard)	6
US Mainstream Top 40 (Billboard)	35
US Rhythmic Top 40 (Billboard)	15

=== Decade-end charts ===
Decade-end chart performance for "U Remind Me"
Chart (2000–2009)	Position
US Billboard Hot 100	90

== Certifications ==
Certifications and sales for "U Remind Me"
Region	Certification	Certified units/sales
Australia (ARIA)	2× Platinum	140,000^{‡}
Belgium (BRMA)	Gold	25,000^{*}
Denmark (IFPI Danmark)	Gold	45,000^{‡}
France	—	275,926
Germany (BVMI)	Gold	300,000^{‡}
New Zealand (RMNZ) Physical sales	Gold	5,000^{*}
New Zealand (RMNZ) Digital sales + streaming	3× Platinum	90,000^{‡}
Sweden (GLF)	Gold	15,000^{^}
United Kingdom (BPI)	Platinum	600,000^{‡}
United States (RIAA)	2× Platinum	2,000,000^{‡}
^{*} Sales figures based on certification alone.^{^} Shipments figures based on certification alone.^{‡} Sales+streaming figures based on certification alone.

== Release history ==
Release dates and formats for "U Remind Me"
Region	Date	Format(s)	Label(s)	Ref(s).
United States	May 22, 2001	Rhythmic contemporary radio; urban radio	Arista	
United States	June 12, 2001	Contemporary hit radio	Arista	
United States	June 19, 2001	CD; 12-inch vinyl	Arista	
Sweden	June 25, 2001	CD	Arista; BMG	
United Kingdom	June 25, 2001	CD; 12-inch vinyl; cassette	Arista; BMG	
Australia	July 30, 2001	CD	Arista	

== See also ==
- List of Hot 100 number-one singles of 2001 (U.S.)
- R&B number-one hits of 2001 (USA)
