= U Got It Bad =

2001 single by Usher

Single by Usher

from the album 8701
- Released: August 21, 2001
- Studio: Southside (Atlanta, Georgia)
- Genre: R&B
- Length: 4:07
- Label: Arista; LaFace
- Songwriters: Usher Raymond; Jermaine Mauldin; Bryan-Michael Cox
- Producers: Jermaine Dupri; Bryan-Michael Cox

Usher singles chronology
"U Remind Me" (2001)	"U Got It Bad" (2001)	"U Don't Have to Call" (2002)

Music video
- "U Got It Bad" on YouTube

"U Got It Bad" is a song by American singer Usher. It was released through Arista Records as the second official single from his third studio album 8701 (2001). It was written by Usher, Jermaine Dupri and Bryan-Michael Cox, and produced by Dupri, with Cox credited as co-producer. Released in the United States on August 21, 2001, "U Got It Bad" is an R&B ballad that, according to MTV, incorporates "digi-coustic" guitars, a "slow-burning bass line" and "sex funk" drums. The lyrics notably contain some quick direct allusions to other soul music ballads, mainly Maxwell's "Fortunate" and Prince's "Adore".

"U Got It Bad" was released to generally favorable reviews from critics. It became Usher's third song to top the US Billboard Hot 100 as well as the second consecutive single from 8701 to do so. Elsewhere, it entered the top five in Australia, New Zealand, and the United Kingdom, and reached the top 40 on most charts that it appeared on. The song's accompanying music video, directed by Little X, was filmed as a two-part story with "U Don't Have to Call" and features Usher's then-girlfriend, TLC's Chilli, as his love interest.

== Background and writing ==
"U Got It Bad" was written by Usher, Jermaine Dupri and Bryan-Michael Cox, with production helmed by the former and co-production from the latter. Recording was done by Brian Frye and mixing by Dupri and Phil Tan, at Southside Studios, Atlanta, Georgia in 2000. John Horesco IV provided mixing assistance, William "Billy" Odum performed the guitar and Usher provided all vocals. Talking to Complex, Dupri stated that "U Got It Bad" was inspired by Usher's previous single "Nice & Slow", saying that he produced the song as he wanted to re-produce a track similar to the latter in terms of success, for Usher's 8701 (2001).

The lyrics to the song were, according to Dupri, inspired by a true story after he and Usher had been in the studio trying to record some music for the album, but Usher was continually distracted by a girl he had brought into the studio. Following an argument, the girl left. A while later, they started on talking on the phone, which prompted Dupri to kick Usher out of the studio telling him, "We're going to do this [session] later on. You got it completely too bad right now. You got it bad." This ignited the inspiration for the song, and once Usher had left, Dupri started writing its lyrics, with the notion that it was going to be a big hit. Once Usher had returned to the studio, Dupri shared the story of the song with him.

== Composition and release ==
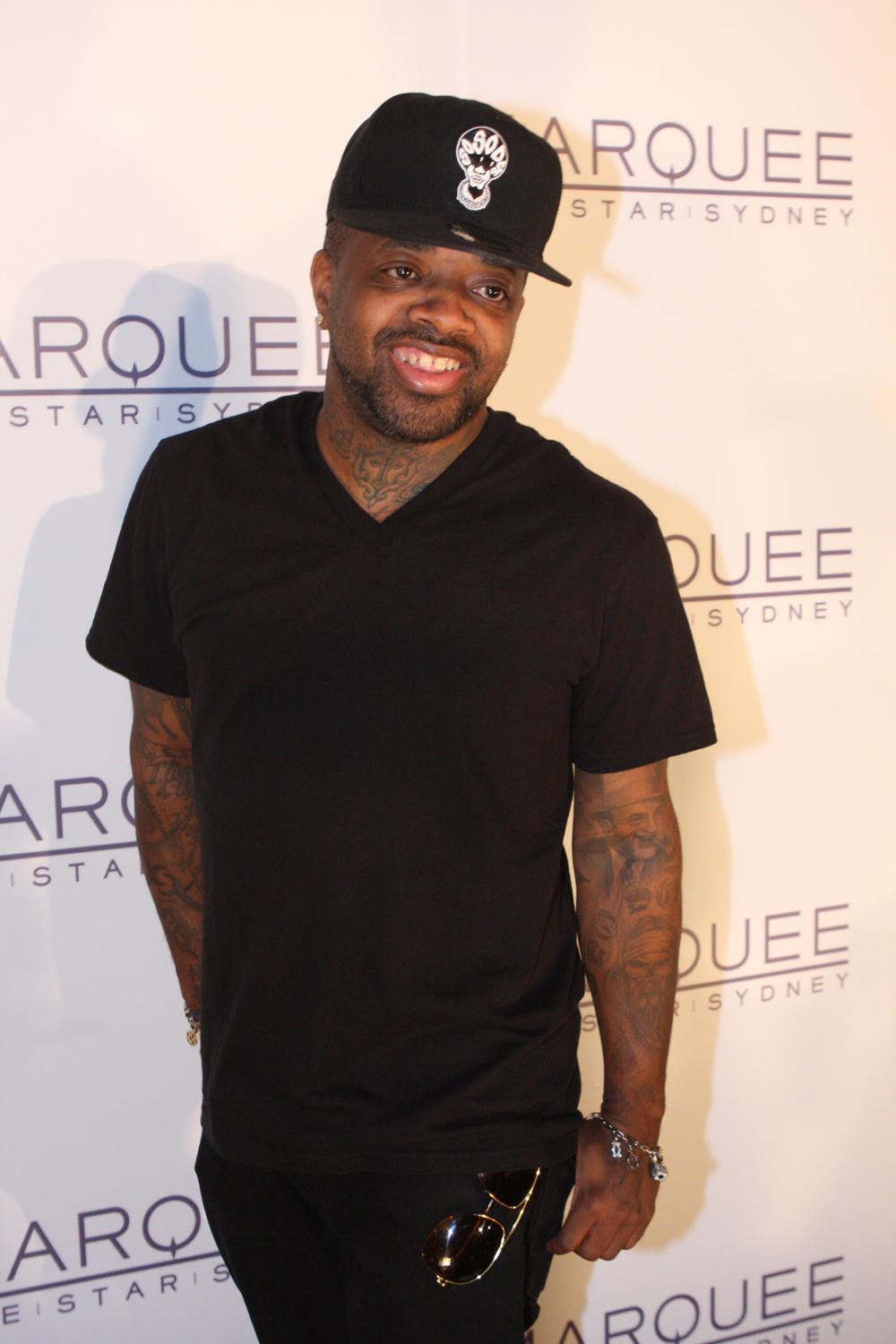
Producer Jermaine Dupri used "digi-coustic" guitars and a "slow-burning bass line" on "U Got It Bad".

"U Got It Bad" is an R&B ballad. According to the sheet music published at Musicnotes.com by Sony/ATV Music Publishing, it is written in the key of B minor and has a tempo of 66 beats per minute. Usher's vocal range spans from the low note of F♯_{4} to the high note of A_{5}. The song is actually a semitone lower in the key of B-flat minor, which would have the vocals span from F_{4} to A♭_{5}. "U Got It Bad" is a slow jam, that makes use of "digi-coustic" guitars, a "slow-burning bass line" and "sex funk" drums. Usher's vocals "floats and runs" between the song's melodies, before intensifying when entering the chorus.

The Neptunes-produced track, "I Don't Know", was initially intended as the album's second single. Rapper P. Diddy was to direct its music video in Los Angeles in July 2001. The song was receiving radio play prior to the release of 8701's first single "U Remind Me". However, Usher instead released "U Got It Bad" as the album's second single, as it presents his own unique sound, "If you wanna know what a Usher record is, then ["U Got It Bad" is] it," while using both Michael Jackson and Bobby Brown as examples of artists who "solidified" their music through their own unique music. "U Got it Bad" was released as a CD single in the US on December 18, 2001.

== Reception ==
"U Got It Bad" earned generally favorable reviews from music critics. NME called the song 8701's "stand-out track [that] deals with the spectre of first love with passion, honesty and some raw beats." Kelefa Sanneh from The New York Times cited "U Got It Bad" as 2001's "best slow jam, coasting along on a double-time vocal line and a whisper of acoustic guitar." Austin Williams from Vibe noted that "U Got It Bad" "isn't like most begging music that's celebrated. Though it certainly contains the fundamental elements of the subgenre – passionate singing, dramatic declarations of love, and a music video with a grand gesture of desperation – there's a generality to its writing that's preserved its resonance."

"U Got It Bad" was nominated for several prizes, including the Soul Train Music Award for Best R&B/Soul Single – Male at the 2002 Soul Train Music Awards. In 2002, it won Choice Love Song at the 2002 Teen Choice Awards, and in 2003, the song was awarded an ASCAP Award for Publisher of the Year. In 2016, Complex ranked the song number eight on their list of the 25 greatest Usher songs, with editor Edwin Ortiz calling it a "slow-burning ballad meant to top anything Usher had released prior," further writing: "Whereas "Nice & Slow" delivered a slow jam vibe ripe for a late night rendezvous, "U Got It Bad" was the antithesis of an erotic fantasy, with Usher exploring a relationship he can't sensibly appreciate." In 2021, American Songwriter ranked the song number five on their list of the 10 greatest Usher songs.

== Chart performance ==
"U Got It Bad" topped the US Billboard Hot 100 chart on the week of December 15, 2001, becoming Usher's third number-one song on the chart. It was his second Hot 100 number one from 8701 after "U Remind Me", which reached the position in July of the same year. "U Got It Bad" marked the first time he obtained two consecutive number one hits. In December 2001, Usher became one of the few Arista acts to have more than one Hot 100 number one hit, with Whitney Houston having eleven, Barry Manilow and Milli Vanilli with three, and Monica with two. "U Got It Bad" was also atop the Hot 100 Airplay chart that week, with an audience impression of 135 million. The following week, the song was replaced by Nickelback's "How You Remind Me", moving it to number two. Nickelback's single remained number one for four consecutive weeks, before being replaced by "U Got It Bad" on the week of January 8, 2002, which went on to top the Hot 100 for five weeks. On the same week, the song broke the record for the highest audience impression on the Hot 100 Airplay chart, previously held by Alicia Keys, with 149,858,700 listeners. The song's popularity helped 8701 rise from number twenty-three to eight on the US Billboard 200 on the week of October 11, 2001.

== Music video ==
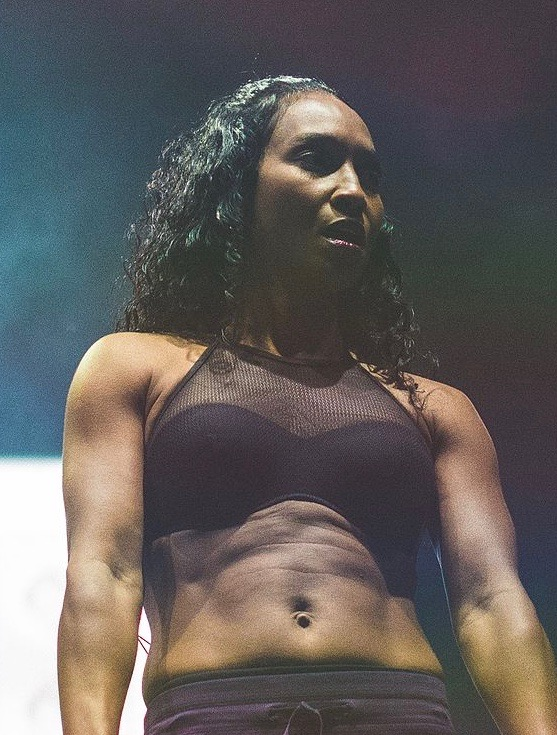
TLC member Chilli co-starred as Usher's love interest in the video.

A music video for "U Got It Bad" was directed by Canadian filmmaker Little X. Co-starring TLC member Rozonda "Chilli" Thomas as the female lead, the video starts with Usher tossing and turning in bed, troubled by the thought of his ex-girlfriend (Thomas). After awakening, he turns on the TV, only to see his ex, a celebrity on her own, on every station. The video proceeds to introduce flashbacks of happier times between the two, suggesting that he still longs for his ex. In his desperation to find her, he braves the rain, bursting into her trailer to apologize and reconcile with her. However, this is revealed to be his imagination, and instead of opening the door of the trailer, he walks away ashamed. Disgusted, he makes his way home and lies in his bed, alone.

The visuals for follow-up single "U Don't Have to Call", filmed in February 2002, served as a continuation from "U Got It Bad". At the 2002 MTV Video Music Awards, the video was nominated for Best Male Video and Best R&B Video. It also received a Video of the Year nod at the 2002 BET Awards. In 2018, Little X told Billboard: "This one was a little more personal. I was young and was kind of venting through my own life experience through the song. Usher and I were around the same age, and it was just one of those [videos] that really clicked. I think there was something special about that video, having a really young director with a really young artist making this thing happen together."

== Track listing ==
CD single
No.	Title	Writer(s)	Producer(s)	Length
1.	"U Got It Bad" (radio mix)	Usher Raymond; Jermaine Dupri; Bryan-Michael Cox	Dupri; Cox^{[A]}	4:07
2.	"U Got It Bad" (Tee's Latin remix)	Raymond; Dupri; Cox	Dupri; Cox^{[A]}; Todd Terry^{[B]}	7:58
3.	"U Got It Bad" (Soulpower remix)	Raymond; Dupri; Cox	Dupri; Cox^{[A]}; Soulshock & Karlin^{[B]}	4:03
4.	"U Got It Bad" (Tee's Inhouse Club remix)	Raymond; Dupri; Cox	Dupri; Cox^{[A]}; Terry^{[B]}	6:00
5.	"U Got It Bad" (Tee's dub)	Raymond; Dupri; Cox	Dupri; Cox^{[A]}; Terry^{[B]}	6:00

UK CD single
No.	Title	Writer(s)	Producer(s)	Length
1.	"U Got It Bad" (radio mix)	Raymond; Dupri; Cox	Dupri; Cox^{[A]}	4:07
2.	"U Remind Me" (remix) (featuring Method Man and Blu Cantrell)	Anita McCloud; Edmund "Eddie Hustle" Clement; Jean-Claude Olivier; Samuel Barnes; Edward G. Fletcher; Melle Mel; Clifton "Jiggs" Chase; Sylvia Robinson	Clement; Jimmy Jam & Terry Lewis; Poke & Tone^{[B]}	3:56
3.	"U Got It Bad" (Soulpower remix)	Raymond; Dupri; Cox	Dupri; Cox^{[A]}; Soulshock & Karlin^{[B]}	4:03
4.	"U Got It Bad" (Tee's Inhouse Club remix)	Raymond; Dupri; Cox	Dupri; Cox^{[A]}; Terry^{[B]}	6:00

Notes

- ^{^[A]} denotes co-producer

Sample credits

- "U Remind Me (remix)" contains samples from "The Message" as performed by Grandmaster Flash.

== Charts ==
=== Weekly charts ===
2001–2002 weekly chart performance for "U Got It Bad"
Chart (2001–2002)	Peak position
Australia (ARIA)	3
Australian Urban (ARIA)	1
Belgium (Ultratip Bubbling Under Flanders)	3
Belgium (Ultratop 50 Wallonia)	36
Canada (Nielsen SoundScan)	17
Canada CHR (Nielsen BDS)	4
Croatia (HRT)	10
Europe (Eurochart Hot 100)	24
France (SNEP)	18
Germany (GfK)	26
Ireland (IRMA)	36
Netherlands (Dutch Top 40)	27
Netherlands (Single Top 100)	20
New Zealand (Recorded Music NZ)	3
Scotland Singles (OCC)	20
Sweden (Sverigetopplistan)	50
Switzerland (Schweizer Hitparade)	13
UK Singles (OCC)	5
UK Hip Hop/R&B (OCC)	3
US Billboard Hot 100	1
US Hot R&B/Hip-Hop Songs (Billboard)	1
US Pop Airplay (Billboard)	3
US Rhythmic Airplay (Billboard)	1

2024 weekly chart performance for "U Got It Bad"
Chart (2024)	Peak position
UK Downloads (OCC)	93

=== Year-end charts ===
2001 year-end chart performance for "U Got It Bad"
Chart (2001)	Position
UK Singles (OCC)	118
US Hot R&B/Hip-Hop Singles & Tracks (Billboard)	64
US Rhythmic Top 40 (Billboard)	60

2002 year-end chart performance for "U Got It Bad"
Chart (2002)	Position
Australia (ARIA)	38
Australian Urban (ARIA)	6
Canada (Nielsen SoundScan)	133
Canada Radio (Nielsen BDS)	62
Switzerland (Schweizer Hitparade)	88
US Billboard Hot 100	9
US Hot R&B/Hip-Hop Singles & Tracks (Billboard)	18
US Mainstream Top 40 (Billboard)	9
US Rhythmic Top 40 (Billboard)	8
US Top 40 Tracks (Billboard)	9

=== Decade-end charts ===
Decade-end chart performance for "U Got It Bad"
Chart (2000–2009)	Position
US Billboard Hot 100	15

=== All-time chart ===
All-time chart performance for "U Got It Bad"
Chart (1958–2018)	Position
US Billboard Hot 100	126

== Certifications and sales ==
Certifications and sales for "U Got It Bad"
Region	Certification	Certified units/sales
Australia (ARIA)	2× Platinum	140,000^{‡}
New Zealand (RMNZ) Physical sales	Gold	5,000^{*}
New Zealand (RMNZ) Digital sales + streaming	2× Platinum	60,000^{‡}
United Kingdom (BPI)	Platinum	600,000^{‡}
United States (RIAA) Digital	5× Platinum	5,000,000^{‡}
United States (RIAA) Mastertone	Gold	500,000^{*}
United States (RIAA) Video single	Gold	25,000^{^}
^{*} Sales figures based on certification alone.^{^} Shipments figures based on certification alone.^{‡} Sales+streaming figures based on certification alone.

== Release history ==
Release dates and formats for "U Got It Bad"
Region	Date	Format(s)	Label(s)	Ref.
United States	August 21, 2001	Urban; urban AC radio	Arista; LaFace	
United States	September 18, 2001	Rhythmic contemporary radio	Arista; LaFace	
United Kingdom	October 8, 2001	CD; cassette	Arista; LaFace	
Sweden	October 22, 2001	CD	Arista; LaFace	
United States	October 30, 2001	Contemporary hit radio	Arista; LaFace	
Australia	December 3, 2001	CD	Arista; LaFace	
United States	January 18, 2002	Hot adult contemporary radio	Arista; LaFace	

== See also ==
- List of Billboard Hot 100 number-one singles of 2001
- List of number-one R&B singles of 2001 (U.S.)
