= 8701 =

2001 album by Usher

Studio album by Usher
- Released: July 9, 2001
- Recorded: 2000–2001
- Genre: R&B
- Length: 57:09
- Label: Arista
- Producers: Usher Raymond; Jermaine Dupri; Antonio "LA" Reid; The Neptunes; Babyface; Mike City; Bryan Michael Cox; Jimmy Jam and Terry Lewis; Edmund "Eddie Hustle" Clement; She'kspere; Soulshock & Karlin; Daron Jones; Cedric Moore; Poke & Tone

Usher chronology
Live (1999)	8701 (2001)	Confessions (2004)

Singles from 8701
- 1. "U Remind Me" Released: May 22, 2001; 2. "U Got It Bad" Released: August 21, 2001; 3. "U Don't Have to Call" Released: January 18, 2002; 4. "U-Turn" Released: March 11, 2002; 5. "Can U Help Me" Released: August 20, 2002

8701 is the third studio album by American singer Usher, released in the United Kingdom on July 9, 2001, and in the United States on August 7, 2001, by Arista Records. Recording was handled by several producers including The Neptunes, Jermaine Dupri, Babyface, Kevin "She'kspere" Briggs, Mike City, Bryan Michael Cox, Jimmy Jam & Terry Lewis. Although intended for an October 31, 2000, release under the title All About U, the album was delayed numerous times, following the leak of several tracks onto the online music store Napster. Usher subsequently recorded new tracks and released the album under the new title, 8701, which is derived from Usher having sung for the first time in his local church in 1987 and the album's US release date of August 7, 2001. The single "Can U Help Me" was supplied with Windows XP Service Pack 2 and later Windows versions to showcase Windows Media Player 11 and higher WMP versions.

8701 takes inspiration from multiple artists, including Donny Hathaway, Stevie Wonder, Marvin Gaye, and Michael Jackson. It follows the theme of Usher's relationship experience, along with the emotions of love and heartache. Usher promoted the album by embarking on the supporting tour, 8701 Evolution Tour in 2002, his first concert tour, to which it he performed in forty-four shows across North America. He also made appearances in television shows, including Live! with Regis and Kelly and Total Request Live.

8701 produced two Billboard Hot 100 number one singles, "U Remind Me" and "U Got It Bad", along with the top three single "U Don't Have to Call". The album debuted at number four on the US Billboard 200 chart, with 210,000 copies sold in its first week. 8701 has since been certified five-times platinum by the Recording Industry Association of America (RIAA), and has sold eight million copies worldwide as of 2010. 8701 received generally positive reviews from critics, who praised Usher's vocals and development as an artist, but were ambivalent towards some of the album's material. The album earned Usher numerous awards, including a BET Award, two Grammy Awards, and three Billboard Music Awards.

== Background ==
Usher had initially planned to release the album entitled All About U, as his third studio album on October 31, 2000. The album was to follow his successful My Way (1997) which to date, has sold over seven million copies. On March 13, 2000, multiple tracks from the album had leaked on to online music store Napster several months prior to its release, including "T.T.P.", "U R the One" and "Pop Ya Collar". Following the event, the album's release was delayed twice, on December 5, 2000, to July 17, 2001. During the taping of MTV Icon Janet Jackson special, Usher explained that he returned to the studios to record new songs, stating "I didn't want that to be the way my record was remembered or the way I would present that to my fans [...] It turned out a lot better" while adding that tracks that were available for download on the site were not going to be included on the new album. With new tracks produced, Usher's publicist announced a new name for the album, under the title 8701, who claims that it is "practically a new album". The origin of its new name was initially unknown, with speculation that it subsides with its US release of August 7, 2001 (8/7/01), though Usher's publicist claimed that this was purely coincidental, and was not the reasoning for the title. Usher hinted that it was derived after something significant to him, and he would disclose it in the upcoming months. Eventually, his spokesperson revealed that the '87' segment of the title refers to the year 1987, when Usher sang in public for the first time at his church in Atlanta, with the '01' referring to the year 2001.

== Recording ==
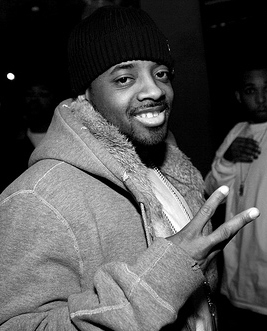
Jermaine Dupri (pictured) produced and co-wrote several songs on the album, along with frequent collaborator Bryan-Michael Cox.

8701 was recorded in the United States, in the cities of Los Angeles, New York, Minneapolis and Atlanta. The album's production was handled by several producers including The Neptunes, P. Diddy, Jermaine Dupri—who had produced the majority of Usher's previous album, My Way—Babyface, Kevin "She'kspere" Briggs, Mike City, Bryan Michael Cox and Jimmy Jam & Terry Lewis. Both Jam and Lewis were asked by Usher's mother, and then manager, to contribute to 8701's production, during the 2000 MTV Music Awards. According to Jam, his mother had said "Oh my God, Usher's got this track and we thought you guys would be perfect to produce it". Several months later, Jam and Lewis produced the song "Separated", along with multi-platinum producers Ric Atari & Daron Jones (who also wrote the record) to which the producers then turned in to L.A. Reid, who liked the track, and asked them to produce more. Following this, Usher asked both producers to create a song similar to their 1985 "Tender Love", performed by R&B vocal group Force MDs. Though he wanted it to be his own unique record, which contains a small similarity, to which Jam and Lewis created "Can U Help Me". Following the completion of 8701, Jam and Lewis were sent back to the studio by Reid to revamp the album's second single "U Remind Me", explaining "we already know he can dance, and he's got the style and that whole thing. But I want people to just go, he can sing.

== Composition ==
In an interview with MTV, Usher commented that lyrically, 8701 represents his "soul", and elaborated by explaining that he was inspired by love and heartache; "I listen to a lot of Donny Hathaway's, Stevie Wonder's, Marvin Gaye's and Michael Jackson's earlier records, those Motown greats. There's a little bit of all of that in the album. I really appreciate what music was back then as well as in the early '90s when you had artists like Troop and Jodeci, and Michael Jackson was in his prime." Usher explained that the album's lyrics also reflect on what has been going on with his relationship; 8701 is predominantly an R&B album. "Can U Help Me", is about a deep relationship to which Usher experienced. "U Don't Have to Call" is a hip hop song inspired by Jackson, while "U Got It Bad" is an R&B slow-jam. About "U Got It Bad", Kyle Anderson of MTV wrote that it makes use of the acoustic guitar and a "slow-burning bassline" throughout. The album's lead single "U Remind Me" is also an R&B track, and its lyrics is based on meeting a woman who reminds Usher of an ex-girlfriend, and therefore cannot date her.

== Singles ==
"Pop Ya Collar" was released from Usher's previously intended third studio album All About U as the first single. Following the song's leak on online music store Napster, along with several other tracks, it was added to some editions of 8701. It entered and peaked at number two on the UK Singles Chart, but was less successful in the United States, peaking at number 60 on the Billboard Hot 100 and number 25 on the Hot R&B/Hip-Hop Songs chart. 8701's first official single was "U Remind Me", released on May 22, 2001. The song sold nearly 100,000 copies in its opening week and received positive reviews from most critics, who cited it as a highlight from the album. The song topped the Billboard Hot 100, for four consecutive weeks. "U Remind Me" also reached the top five in several countries, including France, Belgium (Wallonia), New Zealand, the United Kingdom and Australia. It has been certified platinum by the Australian Recording Industry Association (ARIA) and gold by the Recording Industry Association of New Zealand (RIANZ). "I Don't Know", featuring rapper-producer P. Diddy, was planned as the album's second single. It received radio play prior to the release of "U Remind Me", peaking at number 68 on the Hot R&B/Hip-Hop Songs chart, and a video was to be produced in Los Angeles, directed by Diddy.

The album's second single was instead "U Got It Bad", released on August 21, 2001. Like its predecessor, the song topped the Billboard Hot 100 chart. It was number one for a single week, before being replaced by Nickelback's "How You Remind Me" for four weeks. The song then returned to the top, replacing the latter song for four more weeks. "U Got It Bad" also achieved chart success in other territories, reaching the top five in New Zealand, Australia and the UK. The song has been certified five-times platinum by the Recording Industry Association of America (RIAA). "U Don't Have to Call" was released as the third single on January 18, 2002. It impacted the Hot 100, peaking at number three, and the Hot R&B/Hip-Hop Songs chart, at number two. It was released with P. Diddy's "I Need a Girl (Part One)" in the UK as a B-side single, and reached number four. "U-Turn" was released as the album's fourth single on March 11, 2002, as an international single. It reached the top ten in Belgium and Australia. "Can U Help Me" was released as the album's final single on August 20, 2002. It peaked at number 57 on the Hot R&B/Hip-Hop Songs chart and number 30 on the Rhythmic Top 40 chart.

== Release and promotion ==
Usher initially planned to release his third studio album on October 31, 2000, under the title All About U, but due to the leak of multiple tracks several months prior to the date, it was delayed. First to December 5, 2000, it was delayed again to June 17, 2001. In regards to this, Usher commented that "Pushing the record back was a risk, but I thought it would build anticipation". 8701's final release date was July 9, 2001, in the United Kingdom and August 7, 2001, on Arista Records, in the United States, Australia and Canada. On the day of release of the album in the United States, to which Arista labelled as "Usher day", Usher performed the album's lead single "U Remind Me" on the show Live! with Regis and Kelly. He also performed the single during the 2001 BET Awards and the United We Stand: What More Can I Give concert at RFK Stadium in Washington D.C., which was held in tribute to the victims of the September 11, 2001, attacks. Usher appeared on Total Request Live, attended an auto-graph signing session in a Virgin mega store, and a listening session for the album in the Planet Hollywood restaurant. Usher performed "U Got It Bad" at the 2002 American Music Awards, and again on June 16, 2002, at the Tweeter Center along with "U Don't Have to Call" during his concert.

== Critical reception ==
Professional ratings
Aggregate scores
Source	Rating
Metacritic	67/100
Review scores
Source	Rating
AllMusic	3/5 stars
Blender	4/5 stars
Entertainment Weekly	B−
NME	4/5 stars
Q	2/5 stars
Rolling Stone	3/5 stars
Slant Magazine	3/5 stars
Vibe	3/5
Yahoo! Music UK	7/10

8701 received generally positive reviews from music critics. At Metacritic, which assigns a normalized rating out of 100 to reviews from mainstream critics, the album received an average score of 67, based on 11 reviews. NME's Lucy O'Brien commended Usher for producing a more mature album, that "reflects his emotional experience" writing "Versatility is the key here: staccato beats with mellifluous melody, rich slow-jams and edgy harmonies – but woven through with Usher's own perspective. A winner." BBC Online's Christian Hopwood also favoured the album, commenting on how Usher has developed "his producing, singing and song writing skills to a new level" noting his contribution to twelve of the seventeen tracks. Dan Leroy of Yahoo! Music declared the album an improvement "over Usher's "old" new album"—All About You—and depicted it as his best work to-date. Leroy credited the production groups The Neptunes and Jimmy Jam & Terry Lewis, depicting that they have done "some of their best work" on the album. J. D. Considine of Blender commented that the album "does what it's supposed to, giving Usher a grown-up R&B sound without reducing his boyish charm". Kathryn McGuire of Rolling Stone described Usher's vocals as "velvety" and further wrote that "Amid all the playboy pouting and preening, Usher's vocals are impressively adaptable [...]. McGuire noted the album's primary fault is that "Usher never surrenders his meticulously groomed veneer", with every track being formulaic, or "radio-safe".

Sal Cinquemani of Slant Magazine noted the distinction between several of the album's songs with Janet Jackson's, while comparing Usher's vocals to that of another Jackson member, Michael Jackson "[...] bring out the other Jackson in Usher, bolstering falsetto vocal bridges on "I Don't Know" and "U Don't Have to Call" that are undeniably Pop Royalty." Vibe's Jason King complimented some of the material on the album, but was disappointed with the "heavyweight producers" not producing any "masterpieces". Stephen Erlewine of AllMusic gave a positive opinion on Usher's development, writing "He looks good, his material is smooth and seductive, and he has a nice voice, even if he tends to favor melisma". Erlewine also labelled the album as "a classy, seductive affair" but was ambivalent towards its material, due to the lack of memorable tracks. Entertainment Weekly's Josh Tyrangiel said that the tracks "blend harmlessly together", but was ambivalent towards the quality of the songs produced after Usher's four-year hiatus.

=== Accolades ===
The album earned Usher numerous accolades. At the 44th Grammy Awards he won his first Grammy, for Best R&B Vocal Performance Male (for "U Remind Me"). The following year, at the 45th Grammy Awards, he won the award again, for "U Don't Have to Call". As an act Usher won several awards, including three Billboard R&B/Hip-Hop Awards in 2002, for Top R&B/Hip-Hop Singles Artist, Top R&B/Hip-Hop Male Artist and Top R&B/Hip-Hop Artist, and a BET Award for Best R&B Artist. At the 2002 Soul Train Music Awards, the album earned him an award for Male R&B/Soul Album. In December 2009, the album and its single, "U Got It Bad", were ranked as some of the best records of the 2000–2009 decade. The former was positioned at number sixty-three and the latter at number fifteen, respectively, on the Billboard 200 and Hot 100 Decade-End Charts. In 2008, "U Got It Bad" was ranked as one of the all-time Hot 100 songs, positioned at number ninety-nine.

== Commercial performance ==
The album debuted at number-four on the US Billboard 200 Chart selling 210,000 copies in its first week; it was the second highest debut of the week, behind Isley Brothers' Eternal. The album exceeded its predecessor's sales, My Way (1997), which debuted at number fifteen selling 66,000 copies in its opening week. Eighteen weeks after the release of 8701, it had sold 1.94 million copies, and was predicted to be on pace to out-sell My Way, which sold 1.32 million units during the same period. On the week of February 25, 2002, 8701's total sales stood at 3.2 million and it was charted at number eleven on the Billboard 200. By March 9, 2010, the album had sold 4.7 million copies in the United States, and had received a 4× platinum certification from the Recording Industry Association of America (RIAA).

The album debuted atop the Canadian Albums Chart, and spent three weeks on the chart. It topped the UK Albums Chart on the week ending July 21, 2001, and spent a total of 59 weeks on the chart. The album was certified platinum by the British Phonographic Industry (BPI). On the Australian Albums Chart, 8701 peaked at number seven, and remained on the chart for forty-three weeks. It was certified 2× platinum by the Australian Recording Industry Association (ARIA). The album debuted in the top five on the Danish Albums Chart and Belgium Albums Chart (Wallonia). It debuted in the top ten in several countries, including New Zealand, The Netherlands, Switzerland and Norway. 8701 was the 18th best-selling album of 2001, shipping 4.4 million copies worldwide in that year according to the International Federation of the Phonographic Industry (IFPI). By November 2010, the album had sold over 8 million copies worldwide.

== Track listing ==
US edition
No.	Title	Writer(s)	Producer(s)	Length
1.	"Intro-Lude 8701"	Usher Raymond IV	Raymond; Jimmy Jam & Terry Lewis^{[A]}	0:44
2.	"U Remind Me"	Anita McCloud; Edmund "Eddie Hustle" Clement	Clement; Jam & Lewis	4:26
3.	"I Don't Know" (featuring P. Diddy)	Pharrell Williams; Drayton Goss	The Neptunes	4:26
4.	"Twork It Out"	Raymond; James Harris III; Terry Lewis	Jam & Lewis	4:42
5.	"U Got It Bad"	Raymond; Jermaine Dupri; Bryan-Michael Cox	Dupri; Cox^{[A]}	4:07
6.	"If I Want To"	Raymond; Kenneth Edmonds; Dupri; Cox; Christopher Wallace; Osten Harvey; Roger Troutman	Babyface; Dupri; Cox^{[A]}	3:46
7.	"I Can't Let U Go"	Raymond; Dupri; Cox	Dupri; Cox^{[A]}	3:28
8.	"U Don't Have to Call"	Williams	The Neptunes	4:29
9.	"Without U (Interlude)"	Raymond	Raymond; Jam & Lewis^{[A]}	0:53
10.	"Can U Help Me"	Raymond; Harris III; Lewis	Jam & Lewis	5:35
11.	"How Do I Say"	Raymond; Harris III; Lewis	Jam & Lewis; James "Big Jim" Wright^{[A]}	5:39
12.	"Hottest Thing"	Michael Flowers	Mike City	3:49
13.	"Good Ol' Ghetto"	Raymond; Dupri; Cox	Dupri; Cox^{[A]}	4:00
14.	"U-Turn"	Raymond; Dupri; Cox	Dupri; Cox^{[A]}	3:09
15.	"U R the One"	Raymond; R.L. Huggar	Soulshock & Karlin	3:56
Total length:				57:09

International edition
No.	Title	Writer(s)	Producer(s)	Length
1.	"Intro-Lude 8701"	Raymond	Raymond; Jam & Lewis^{[A]}	0:44
2.	"U Remind Me"	McCloud; Clement	Clement; Jam & Lewis	4:26
3.	"I Don't Know" (featuring P. Diddy)	Williams; Goss	The Neptunes	4:26
4.	"Twork It Out"	Raymond; Harris III; Lewis	Jam & Lewis	4:42
5.	"U Got It Bad"	Raymond; Dupri; Cox	Dupri; Cox^{[A]}	4:07
6.	"Pop Ya Collar"	Raymond; Kandi Burruss; Kevin "Shekspere" Briggs	Briggs	3:35
7.	"If I Want To"	Raymond; Edmonds; Dupri; Cox; Wallace; Harvey; Troutman	Babyface; Dupri; Cox^{[A]}	3:46
8.	"I Can't Let U Go"	Raymond; Dupri; Cox	Dupri; Cox^{[A]}	3:28
9.	"U Don't Have to Call"	Williams	The Neptunes	4:29
10.	"Without U (Interlude)"	Raymond	Raymond; Jam & Lewis^{[A]}	0:53
11.	"Can U Help Me"	Raymond; Harris III; Lewis	Jam & Lewis	5:35
12.	"How Do I Say"	Raymond; Harris III; Lewis	Jam & Lewis; Wright^{[A]}	5:39
13.	"Hottest Thing"	Flowers	City	3:49
14.	"Good Ol' Ghetto"	Raymond; Dupri; Cox	Dupri; Cox^{[A]}	4:00
15.	"U-Turn"	Raymond; Dupri; Cox	Dupri; Cox^{[A]}	3:09
16.	"T.T.P."	Raymond; Dupri; Cox	Dupri; Cox^{[A]}	3:38
17.	"Separated"	Raymond; Daron Jones; Cedric Moore	Jam & Lewis; Jones; Moore	4:24
Total length:				64:55

Japan bonus track
No.	Title	Writer(s)	Producer(s)	Length
18.	"U Remind Me" (KC's Smooth Remix) (featuring Chemistry)	McCloud; Clement; Kaname Kawabata; Yoshikuni Dohchin	Clement; Jam & Lewis; Kiyoshi Matsuo^{[B]}	4:32

Special edition bonus CD
No.	Title	Writer(s)	Producer(s)	Length
1.	"Pop Ya Collar" (G-Force Double Bass Flex)	Raymond; Burruss; Briggs	Briggs; G4orce^{[B]}	5:54
2.	"U Remind Me" (Remix) (featuring Method Man and Blu Cantrell)	McCloud; Clement; Samuel Barnes; Jean-Claude Olivier; Clifton "Jiggs" Chase; Clifford Smith; Ed Fletcher; Melvin Glover; Sylvia Robinson; Tiffany Cobb	Clement; Jam & Lewis; Trackmasters^{[B]}	3:56
3.	"U Got It Bad" (Soulpower Remix)	Raymond; Dupri; Cox	Dupri; Cox^{[A]}; Soulshock & Karlin^{[B]}	4:03
4.	"U Got It Bad" (Tee's Latin Remix)	Raymond; Dupri; Cox	Dupri; Cox^{[A]}; Todd Terry^{[B]}	7:58
5.	"U Got It Bad" (Tee's Dub)	Raymond; Dupri; Cox	Dupri; Cox^{[A]}; Terry^{[B]}	5:22
6.	"U-Turn" (Almighty Mix)	Raymond; Dupri; Cox	Dupri; Cox^{[A]}; Almighty^{[B]}	7:22
7.	"U Don't Have to Call" (Pound Boys Boogie Vocal)	Williams	The Neptunes; Pound Boys^{[B]}	6:47
8.	"U R the One"	Raymond; Huggar	Soulshock & Karlin	3:57

Notes

- ^{^[A]} denotes co-producer
- ^{^[B]} denotes additional producer

Sample credits

- "If I Want To" contains excerpts from "Goin' Back to Cali", written by Christopher Wallace, Osten Harvey, and Roger Troutman, and performed by The Notorious B.I.G.

== Personnel ==
Credits for 8701 adapted from AllMusic.

- David Ashton – assistant engineer
- Babyface – guest artist
- Dave Barry – guest artist
- Bryan-Michael Cox – instrumentation, producer
- Jermaine Dupri – guest artist
- Kevon Edmonds – guest artist
- Brian Garten – engineer
- Kevin Guarnieri – assistant engineer, engineer
- Jimmy Jam – guest artist
- Kelis – guest artist
- Terry Lewis – guest artist
- P.Diddy – performer, primary artist, featured artist, guest artist
- David Rideau – engineer
- Usher – primary artist, vocals

== Charts ==
=== Weekly charts ===
Weekly chart performance for 8701
Chart (2001–2002)	Peak position
Australian Albums (ARIA)	5
Australian Urban Albums (ARIA)	1
Austrian Albums (Ö3 Austria)	47
Belgian Albums (Ultratop Flanders)	14
Belgian Albums (Ultratop Wallonia)	4
Canadian Albums (Billboard)	1
Canadian R&B Albums (Nielsen SoundScan)	4
Danish Albums (Hitlisten)	3
Dutch Albums (Album Top 100)	7
European Top 100 Albums (Music & Media)	8
French Albums (SNEP)	14
German Albums (Offizielle Top 100)	7
Irish Albums (IRMA)	37
Italian Albums (FIMI)	47
Japanese Albums (Oricon)	34
New Zealand Albums (RMNZ)	8
Norwegian Albums (VG-lista)	10
Scottish Albums (Official Charts)	20
Swedish Albums (Sverigetopplistan)	28
Swiss Albums (Schweizer Hitparade)	10
UK Albums (Official Charts)	1
UK R&B Albums (Official Charts)	1
US Billboard 200	4
US Top R&B/Hip-Hop Albums (Billboard)	3

Weekly chart performance for "8701"
Chart (2024)	Peak position
UK Album Downloads	61

=== Year-end charts ===
Year-end chart performance for 8701
Chart (2001)	Position
Canadian Albums (Nielsen SoundScan)	45
Canadian R&B Albums (Nielsen SoundScan)	10
Dutch Albums (Album Top 100)	66
German Albums (Offizielle Top 100)	79
UK Albums (OCC)	46
US Billboard 200	60
US Top R&B/Hip-Hop Albums (Billboard)	29
Worldwide Albums (IFPI)	15

Chart (2002)	Position
Australian Albums (ARIA)	31
Canadian Albums (Nielsen SoundScan)	74
Canadian R&B Albums (Nielsen SoundScan)	13
UK Albums (OCC)	151
US Billboard 200	16
US Top R&B/Hip-Hop Albums (Billboard)	7

Chart (2004)	Position
UK Albums (OCC)	152

=== Decade-end charts ===
Chart (2000–2009)	Position
US Billboard 200	63
US Top R&B/Hip-Hop Albums (Billboard)	33

== Certifications ==
Region	Certification	Certified units/sales
Australia (ARIA)	2× Platinum	140,000^{^}
Denmark (IFPI Danmark)	Platinum	20,000^{‡}
France (SNEP)	Gold	100,000^{*}
Germany (BVMI)	Gold	150,000^{‡}
Japan (RIAJ)	Gold	100,000^{^}
New Zealand (RMNZ)	Platinum	15,000^{^}
New Zealand (RMNZ) reissue	Platinum	15,000^{‡}
South Africa (RISA)	Platinum	50,000^{*}
Switzerland (IFPI Switzerland)	Gold	20,000^{^}
United Kingdom (BPI)	2× Platinum	600,000^{*}
United States (RIAA)	5× Platinum	5,000,000^{‡}
^{*} Sales figures based on certification alone.^{^} Shipments figures based on certification alone.^{‡} Sales+streaming figures based on certification alone.

== Release history ==
Region	Date	Format	Label
Netherlands	July 1, 2001	CD; digital download	Arista Records
United Kingdom	July 9, 2001	CD; digital download	Arista Records
France	July 10, 2001	CD; digital download	Arista Records
Germany	July 30, 2001	CD; digital download	Arista Records
Australia	August 7, 2001	CD; digital download	Arista Records
Canada	August 7, 2001	CD; digital download	Sony Music Entertainment
United States	August 7, 2001	CD; digital download	Arista Records
New Zealand	August 13, 2001	CD; digital download	Arista Records
