= Pop Ya Collar =

2000 single by Usher

Single by Usher

from the album 8701 (international edition)
- Released: October 17, 2000
- Length: 3:40
- Label: Arista; LaFace
- Songwriters: Usher Raymond; Kevin "She'kspere" Briggs; Kandi Burruss
- Producer: Kevin "She'kspere" Briggs

Usher singles chronology
"Bedtime" (1999)	"Pop Ya Collar" (2000)	"U Remind Me" (2001)

"Pop Ya Collar" is a single by American recording artist Usher, released to US radio on October 17, 2000. It was written by himself, Kevin "She'kspere" Briggs, and Kandi Burruss. The song was produced for his cancelled third studio album All About U. The project was abandoned following the leak of the song and several other tracks onto online music store Napster, several months prior to its release of October 31, 2000. The song was instead later included on non-US editions of his official third studio album, 8701.

"Pop Ya Collar" peaked at number 60 on the US Billboard Hot 100 chart, remaining on the chart for seven weeks. The song was a top-three hit on the UK Singles Chart, peaking at number two in January 2001. It also reached the top 40 in several other territories, including Australia, Germany, Ireland, the Netherlands, Sweden, and Switzerland.

== Background ==
Usher had initially planned to release All About U as his third studio album on October 31, 2000. The album was to follow his commercially successful and breakthrough 1997 album, My Way, which by August 7, 2001, had sold over seven million copies. On March 13, 2001, multiple tracks from the album had leaked on to online music store Napster several months prior to its release, including "T.T.P.", "U R the One" and "Pop Ya Collar". Following the event, the album's release was delayed twice, on December 5, 2000, and July 17, 2001. During the taping of MTV Icon Janet Jackson special, Usher explained that he returned to the studios to record new songs, stating "I didn't want that to be the way my record was remembered or the way I would present that to my fans" while adding that tracks that were available for download on the site were not going to be included on the new album. With new tracks produced, the new album, under the title 8701, was released on August 7, 2001, by Arista Records.

== Release ==
"Pop Ya Collar" was released from Usher's previously intended third studio album All About U as the first single. Following the song's leak on online music store Napster, along with several other tracks, it was added to some editions of 8701. Instead, "U Remind Me" was released as the first official single from Usher's 8701. "Pop Ya Collar" was serviced to various US radio formats on October 17, 2000. It was written by Usher, Kevin "She'kspere" Briggs, and Kandi Burruss and was produced by Briggs.

== Track listings ==
UK CD single

1. "Pop Ya Collar" (radio edit) – 3:34
2. "Pop Ya Collar" (G4orce Jazz Step vocal) – 6:16
3. "My Way" (remix with J.D.) – 3:37

UK 12-inch single

A1. "Pop Ya Collar" (radio edit) – 3:34
A2. "Pop Ya Collar" (G4orce Jazz Step vocal) – 6:16
B1. "Pop Ya Collar" (G4orce Bogle dub) – 5:05

European CD single

1. "Pop Ya Collar" (radio edit) – 3:34
2. "Pop Ya Collar" (G4orce Double Bass Flex) – 5:54

Australian CD single

1. "Pop Ya Collar" (radio edit) – 3:34
2. "Pop Ya Collar" (G4orce Double Bass Flex) – 5:54
3. "Pop Ya Collar" (G4orce Jazz Step vocal) – 6:16
4. "Pop Ya Collar" (G4orce Bogle dub) – 5:05
5. "My Way" (remix with J.D.) – 3:37

== Charts ==
=== Weekly charts ===
Weekly chart performance for "Pop Ya Collar"
Chart (2000–2001)	Peak position
Australia (ARIA)	25
Australian Urban (ARIA)	8
Belgium (Ultratip Bubbling Under Flanders)	3
Belgium (Ultratip Bubbling Under Wallonia)	11
Croatia (HRT)	5
Europe (Eurochart Hot 100)	9
Germany (GfK)	30
Ireland (IRMA)	33
Netherlands (Dutch Top 40)	10
Netherlands (Single Top 100)	16
Scotland Singles (Official Charts)	22
Sweden (Sverigetopplistan)	40
Switzerland (Schweizer Hitparade)	36
UK Singles (Official Charts)	2
UK Dance (Official Charts)	5
UK Hip Hop/R&B (Official Charts)	1
US Billboard Hot 100	60
US Hot R&B/Hip-Hop Songs (Billboard)	25
US Rhythmic Airplay (Billboard)	18
US CHR/Pop Top 50 (Radio & Records)	37

=== Year-end charts ===
2000 year-end chart performance for "Pop Ya Collar"
Chart (2000)	Position
UK Urban (Music Week)	20

2001 year-end chart performance for "Pop Ya Collar"
Chart (2001)	Position
UK Singles (OCC)	84
UK Urban (Music Week)	14

== Certifications ==
Certifications and sales for "Pop Ya Collar"
Region	Certification	Certified units/sales
United Kingdom (BPI)	Silver	200,000^{‡}
^{‡} Sales+streaming figures based on certification alone.

== Release history ==
Release history and formats for "Pop Ya Collar"
Region	Date	Format(s)	Label(s)	Ref.
United States	October 17, 2000	Contemporary hit; rhythmic contemporary; urban radio	Arista; LaFace	
Denmark	January 22, 2001	CD	Arista; LaFace; BMG	
Sweden	January 22, 2001	CD	Arista; LaFace; BMG	
United Kingdom	January 22, 2001	12-inch vinyl; CD; cassette	Arista; LaFace; BMG	
Australia	March 12, 2001	CD	Arista; LaFace; BMG	
