= U-Turn (song) =

2002 single by Usher

Single by Usher

from the album 8701
- Released: March 11, 2002
- Length: 3:09
- Label: Arista
- Songwriters: Usher Raymond; Jermaine Dupri; Bryan-Michael Cox
- Producer: Jermaine Dupri

Usher singles chronology
"I Need a Girl (Part One)" (2002)	"U-Turn" (2002)	"Can U Help Me" (2002)

Music video
- "U-Turn" on YouTube

"U-Turn" is a song by American singer Usher. It written by Usher, Jermaine Dupri, and Bryan-Michael Cox for his third studio album, 8701 (2001), while production was helmed by Dupri and Cox. The song also references Michael Jackson and Bobby Brown and also refers to the crunk style of rap making it one of the first mainstream R&B tracks to refer to that style.

The song was released as the album's fourth international single on March 11, 2002. "U-Turn" reached the top 10 in Australia, the top 20 in the UK and Switzerland and was a top 40 hit in the Netherlands. The single was not released in the US.

== Background ==
"U-Turn" was written by Usher, Jermaine Dupri, and Bryan-Michael Cox, while production was helmed by Dupri and Cox. Originally written for what was supposed to be Usher's third album All About U, the song was among three candidates to be selected as the album's lead single before the album was partially re-recorded and retooled as 8701. With much of All About U inspired by 1980s music, Usher called "U-Turn" a "reflection of the dances people did then – remember "The Bird" by The Time?"

== Music video ==
A music video for "U-Turn" was directed by Little X.

== Track listing ==
European maxi-CD
No.	Title	Writer(s)	Producer(s)	Length
1.	"U-Turn" (album version)	Usher Raymond; Jermaine Dupri; Bryan-Michael Cox	Dupri; Cox^{[A]}	3:12
2.	"U-Turn" (The Almighty mix)	Raymond; Dupri; Cox	Dupri; Cox^{[A]}; Almighty Associates^{[B]}	7:22
3.	"U-Turn" (The Almighty dub)	Raymond; Dupri; Cox	Dupri; Cox^{[A]}; Almighty Associates^{[B]}	7:24
4.	"U R the One"	Raymond; Carsten Schack; Kenneth Karlin; R.L. Huggar; Kawan Prather	Soulshock & Karlin	3:56
5.	"U-Turn" (music video)			3:05

German maxi-CD single
No.	Title	Writer(s)	Producer(s)	Length
1.	"U-Turn" (album version)	Usher Raymond; Jermaine Dupri; Bryan-Michael Cox	Dupri; Cox^{[A]}	3:12
2.	"U-Turn" (The Almighty mix)	Raymond; Dupri; Cox	Dupri; Cox^{[A]}; Almighty Associates^{[B]}	7:22

UK CD single
No.	Title	Writer(s)	Producer(s)	Length
1.	"U-Turn" (album version)	Usher Raymond; Jermaine Dupri; Bryan-Michael Cox	Dupri; Cox^{[A]}	3:12
2.	"U-Turn" (The Almighty mix)	Raymond; Dupri; Cox	Dupri; Cox^{[A]}; Almighty Associates^{[B]}	7:22
3.	"U-Turn" (The Almighty dub)	Raymond; Dupri; Cox	Dupri; Cox^{[A]}; Almighty Associates^{[B]}	7:24
4.	"U-Turn" (music video / bonus footage)			4:15

Notes

- ^{^[A]} denotes co-producer
- ^{^[B]} denotes additional producer

== Personnel ==
- Antranika Clack – mixing assistance
- Bryan-Michael Cox – co-production, writing
- Jermaine Dupri – additional vocals, mixing, production, writing
- Brian Frye – recording engineer
- John Horesco IV – mixing assistance
- Usher Raymond – vocals, writing
- Phil Tan – mixing

== Charts ==
=== Weekly charts ===
Weekly chart performance for "U-Turn"
Chart (2002)	Peak position
Australia (ARIA)	7
Australian Urban (ARIA)	3
Belgium (Ultratip Bubbling Under Flanders)	6
Belgium (Ultratip Bubbling Under Wallonia)	3
Europe (Eurochart Hot 100)	47
Germany (GfK)	51
Netherlands (Dutch Top 40)	36
Netherlands (Single Top 100)	27
Scotland Singles (OCC)	31
Sweden (Sverigetopplistan)	51
Switzerland (Schweizer Hitparade)	22
UK Singles (OCC)	16
UK Hip Hop/R&B (OCC)	3

=== Year-end charts ===
Year-end chart performance for "U-Turn"
Chart (2002)	Position
UK Urban (Music Week)	31

== Release history ==
Release dates and formats for "U-Turn"
Region	Date	Format(s)	Label(s)	Ref.
Europe	March 11, 2002	CD; maxi-CD	Arista	
Denmark	March 18, 2002	Maxi-CD	Arista	
Sweden	March 18, 2002	Maxi-CD	Arista	
United Kingdom	April 8, 2002	CD; maxi-CD	Arista	
Australia	May 13, 2002	CD; maxi-CD	Arista	
