= U Don't Have to Call =

2002 single by Usher

Single by Usher

from the album 8701
- Released: January 18, 2002
- Studio: The Record Plant (Los Angeles, California)
- Genre: R&B
- Length: 4:29
- Label: Arista
- Songwriter: Pharrell Williams
- Producer: The Neptunes

Usher singles chronology
"U Got It Bad" (2001)	"U Don't Have to Call" (2002)	"I Need a Girl (Part One)" (2002)

Music video
- "U Don't Have to Call" on YouTube

"U Don't Have to Call" is a song by American singer Usher. It was written by Pharrell Williams and produced by Williams and Chad Hugo under their production moniker the Neptunes for Usher's third studio album, 8701 (2001). The song was released as the third US single from the album and the fifth international single. In the US, it was first serviced to radio on January 18, 2002, and it was issued as a commercial single in Europe and Australia later that year.

"U Don't Have to Call" peaked at number three on the US Billboard Hot 100 chart. In the United Kingdom, it was released as a double A-side with "I Need a Girl (Part One)" by P. Diddy, on which Usher provides additional vocals; this release reached number four on the UK Singles Chart. "U Don't Have to Call" won Usher his second consecutive Grammy Award for Best Male R&B Vocal Performance in 2003. The single's music video was filmed in Los Angeles at the Westin Bonaventure Hotel and features Usher going to a club with Sean Combs and other celebrities.

== Background ==
"U Don't Have to Call" was written by Neptunes member Pharrell Williams and produced by Williams along with Chad Hugo. The song was initially given to Michael Jackson for his tenth and final studio album Invincible (2001), along with several other songs by the Neptunes. Jackson did not want any of the tracks, and so all the material was passed on to different artists, including Usher and Justin Timberlake. Lyrically, the song tells the story of a man who is tired of worrying about his woman and decides to go live it up with the friends.

Usher's intro on "U Don't Have to Call" was inspired by The Notorious B.I.G.'s "One More Chance" (1995) in which the rapper says: "Don't leave your girl around me / True player for real, ask Puff Daddy." In 2022, Usher commented on the intro: "I go into the studio with Pharrell, who did the song. I'm being authentic to the original, and me and JD were working on the entire 8701 album. So I go in the booth, and I'm like, "Don't leave your girl round me. True player for real, ask my nigga JD." And Pharrell was like, "Yo, man." So I'm like, "Oh, my bad." I flipped it to "Don't leave your girl around me / True playa for real, ask my nigga Pharrell."

== Critical reception ==
"U Don't Have to Call" earned largely positive reviews from critics. In a retrospective review, Fact magazine wrote: "Muffled drums and star guitar – it’s no secret that The [Neptunes] were knocking beats like this out in their sleep in 2001, and without Usher's presence there's three or four songs on N.E.R.D. album In Search of… that you could easily confuse this with. Of course, none of that matters when Usher is present, and "U Don't Have to Call" is the peak moment of one of the Neps' most rewarding relationships." Lauren Nostro from Complex found the song to be "flawlessly written [...] and produced." She further called the song "the sweetest song about losing every fuck you give once you walk into the club." Nostro's colleague Craig Jenkins noted: "You can hear the Neptunes' A game on full display on "U Don't Have to Call," which features half a dozen fragmented, interlocking synth hooks colluding to create the melodic bed for Usher's vocal about a man taking his mind off a break up on a night out with friends. The multitracked weirdness abates for the song's jazzy middle eight, which, if it wasn't created explicitly for [Michael Jackson], was certainly inspired by [Jackson]."

== Music video ==
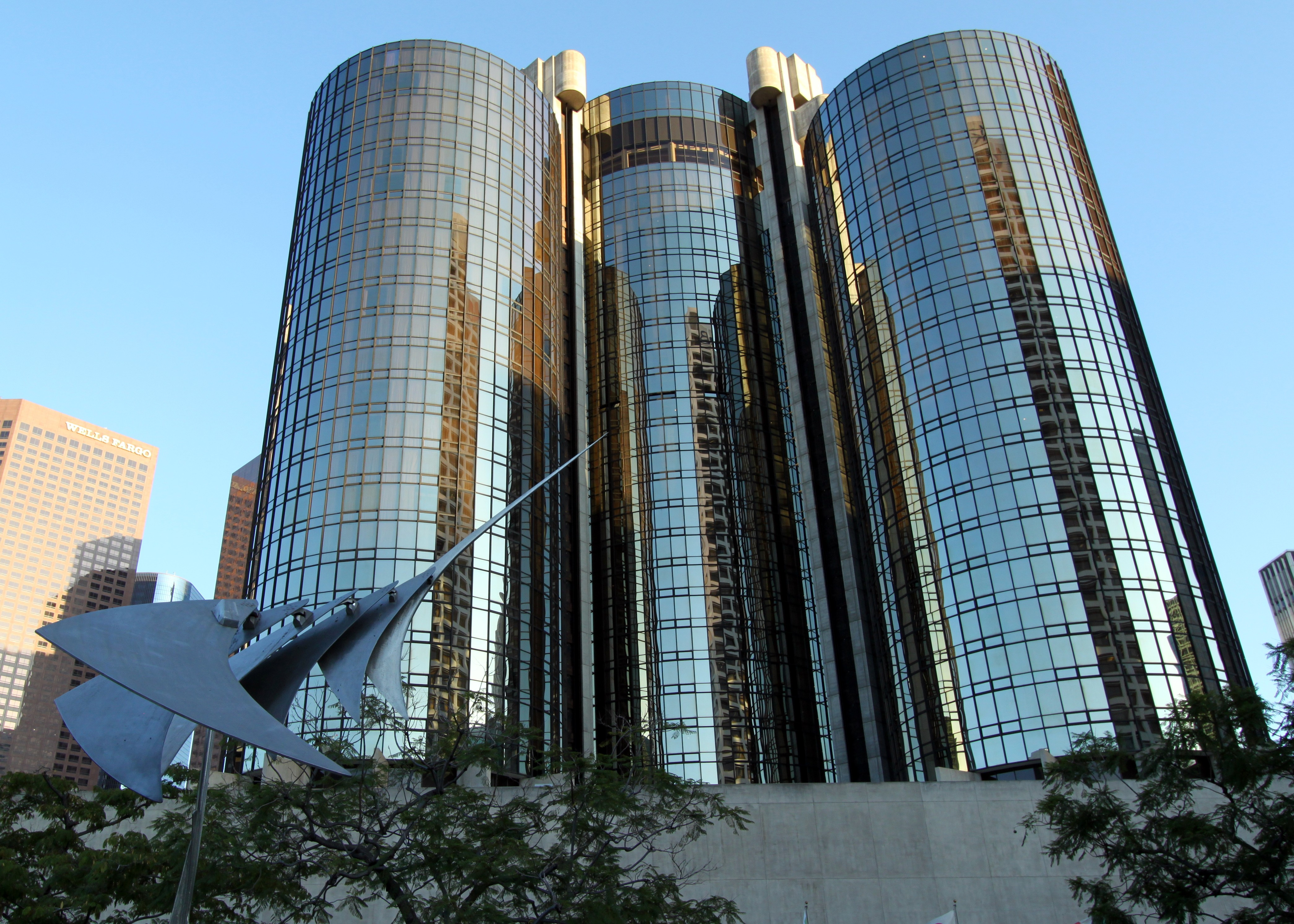
Portions of the video for "U Don't Have to Call" were filmed at the Westin Bonaventure Hotel in Los Angeles.

A music video for "U Don't Have to Call" was directed by Little X. A continuation from the visuals for previous single "U Got It Bad," also directed by Little X, it was filmed back-to-back with the video for "I Need a Girl (Part One)" in February 2002, with the Westin Bonaventure Hotel in Los Angeles serving as one of the shooting locations. P. Diddy makes occasional appearances in the video. TLC member Rozonda "Chilli" Thomas who previously co-starred in "U Got It Bad" as the female lead, has a cameo in the video.

Picking up where the clip left off on "U Got It Bad," the video captures Usher who is "still sobbing" over the separation from his celebrity girlfriend, receiving an uplifting video call from Diddy, who prompts him to come to the club while flanked by his friends. In 2022, Mya Abraham from Vibe ranked the video among Usher's ten best visuals, writing: "As the singer dances like James Brown, half-naked in a bathrobe across his apartment floor and gets ready for a night out, this Director X-led video is signature early 2000s. Plus, if there's one thing Usher is gonna do, it's give us a dance break."

== Track listings ==
US 12-inch single

A1. "U Don't Have to Call" (radio edit) – 3:59
A2. "U Don't Have to Call" (instrumental) – 4:32
B1. "U Don't Have to Call" (album version) – 4:30
B2. "U Don't Have to Call" (acappella) – 4:21

Australian CD single

1. "U Don't Have to Call" (radio edit) – 3:59
2. "U Don't Have to Call" (remix featuring Ludacris) – 4:18
3. "U Don't Have to Call" (Pete Avila's organic club mix) – 6:16
4. "Nice & Slow" (B-Rock's Basement mix) – 4:03

New Zealand CD single

1. "U Don't Have to Call" (radio edit) – 3:59
2. "U Don't Have to Call" (Pete Avila's organic club mix) – 6:16
3. "U Don't Have to Call" (Pound Boys Boogie vocal) – 6:47
4. "U Don't Have to Call" (remix featuring Ludacris radio edit) – 4:18

European CD single

1. "U Don't Have to Call" – 3:53
2. "U Don't Have to Call" (remix featuring Ludacris) – 5:08
3. "U Turn" – 3:12

UK CD single

1. "I Need a Girl (Part One)" (P. Diddy featuring Usher and Loon)
2. "U Don't Have to Call" (remix featuring Ludacris)
3. "I Need a Girl (Part Two)" (P. Diddy featuring Ginuwine, Loon, Mario Winans and Tammy Ruggeri)
4. "I Need a Girl (Part One)" (video)
5. "U Don't Have to Call" (LP version video clip)

UK 12-inch single

A1. "I Need a Girl (Part One)" (P. Diddy featuring Usher and Loon)
B1. "U Don't Have to Call" (remix featuring Ludacris)
B2. "I Need a Girl (Part Two)" (P. Diddy featuring Ginuwine, Loon, Mario Winans and Tammy Ruggeri)

== Credits and personnel ==
Credits are lifted from the European CD single liner notes.

Studio

- Recorded at The Record Plant (Los Angeles, California)
- Mixed at Right Track Recording (Manhattan, New York City) and Criteria (Miami, Florida)

Personnel

- The Neptunes – production
  - Pharrell Williams – writing, all instruments, arrangement
  - Chad Hugo – all instruments, arrangement
- Usher – vocals
- Brian Garten – recording
- Supa Engineer "Duro" – mixing
- Scott Kieklak – mixing assistant

== Charts ==
=== Weekly charts ===
Weekly chart performance for "U Don't Have to Call"
Chart (2002)	Peak position
Australia (ARIA)	56
Australian Urban (ARIA)	12
France (SNEP)	72
New Zealand (Recorded Music NZ)	27
Scotland Singles (OCC) with "I Need a Girl (Part One)"	14
UK Singles (OCC) with "I Need a Girl (Part One)"	4
US Billboard Hot 100	3
US Dance Singles Sales (Billboard)	2
US Hot R&B/Hip-Hop Songs (Billboard)	2
US Pop Airplay (Billboard)	14
US Rhythmic Airplay (Billboard)	4

=== Year-end charts ===
Year-end chart performance for "U Don't Have to Call"
Chart (2002)	Position
UK Urban (Music Week) with "I Need a Girl (Part One)"	2
US Billboard Hot 100	16
US Hot R&B/Hip-Hop Singles & Tracks (Billboard)	2
US Mainstream Top 40 (Billboard)	73
US Maxi-Singles Sales (Billboard)	6
US Rhythmic Top 40 (Billboard)	11

== Certifications and sales ==
Certifications and sales for "U Don't Have to Call"
Region	Certification	Certified units/sales
New Zealand (RMNZ)	Gold	15,000^{‡}
United States (RIAA) Digital	Platinum	1,000,000^{‡}
United States (RIAA) Video single	Gold	25,000^{^}
^{^} Shipments figures based on certification alone.^{‡} Sales+streaming figures based on certification alone.

== Release history ==
Release dates and formats for "U Don't Have to Call"
Region	Date	Format(s)	Label(s)	Ref.
United States	January 18, 2002	Urban radio	Arista	
United States	February 11, 2002	Rhythmic contemporary radio	Arista	
United States	March 18, 2002	Contemporary hit radio	Arista	
United Kingdom	July 29, 2002	12-inch vinyl; CD; cassette	Arista; BMG	
Australia	September 2, 2002	CD	Arista	
