= Love in This Club =

2008 single by Usher

- Standard artwork

Single by Usher featuring Young Jeezy

from the album Here I Stand
- Released: February 22, 2008
- Studio: Zac Recording (Atlanta), Hitland (Alpharetta, Atlanta)
- Genre: R&B; pop rap
- Length: 4:19
- Label: LaFace
- Songwriters: Usher Raymond; Jamal Jones; Jay Jenkins; Lamar Taylor; Ryon Lovett; Keith Thomas; Darnell Dalton; Keri Hilson
- Producer: Polow da Don

Usher singles chronology
"Same Girl" (2007)	"Love in This Club" (2008)	"Love in This Club Part II" (2008)

Young Jeezy singles chronology
"100 Million" (2007)	"Love in This Club" (2008)	"Louie" (2008)

"Love in This Club" is a song by American singer Usher featuring American rapper Young Jeezy. It was released on February 22, 2008, as the lead single from Usher's fifth studio album, Here I Stand. The song was written by Usher, Polow da Don, Jeezy, Darnell Dalton, Ryon Lovett, Lamar Taylor and Keith Thomas, and produced by Polow, with a Las Vegas-inspired synth-driven beat. Its lyrics refer to seducing someone in a nightclub. The song was originally leaked by Polow prior to its release.

"Love in This Club" reached number one in New Zealand and the United States as well as the top 10 in Australia, Belgium, Canada, France, Germany, Ireland, Japan, Norway, Scotland, Slovakia, Sweden, Switzerland, and the United Kingdom. The accompanying music video, which received a nomination at the 2008 MTV Video Music Awards, features cameo appearances from several musicians. In the video, R&B singer Keri Hilson plays Usher's love interest in a club. Usher performed the song at the 2008 BET Awards, as well as on several television programs. A remix of the song, titled "Love in This Club Part II", features Beyoncé and Lil Wayne.

== Background ==
Atlanta-based music producer Polow da Don was inspired to create a beat during his weekend stay in Las Vegas for the 2007 MTV Video Music Awards. He said of the song, "If you listen to the beat, the synths and everything has a [Las] Vegas feel to it. Making love in the club, people in [Las] Vegas are kinda wild." He also noted its Euro influences. When he finished working on the material, Polow felt it fit for Usher, hoping that it would keep female listeners interested in Usher's music, as his popularity had declined among women since his marriage to stylist Tameka Foster in July 2007. Polow and Usher wrote the track with rapper Young Jeezy, Darnell Dalton, Ryon Lovett, Lamar Taylor and Keith Thomas, and it was recorded at Zac Recording, Atlanta and Hitland Studios, Alpharetta.

It was originally planned for Alabama rapper Rich Boy to feature on the track, but after hearing "Love in This Club", Jeezy wanted to contribute to it. Polow was skeptical, but recorded Jeezy's verse. He played the new version to Usher who, enjoying the new version, allowed the verse to stay. Usher has since called Jeezy "one of the greatest rappers of our generation". According to Alabama rapper Gucci Mane, it was initially intended that he feature on the track, rather than Jeezy.

== Composition ==
"Love in This Club"
The mid-tempo song features shuddering synth beats

"Love in This Club" is a mid-tempo R&B slow jam, with a brass bassline, and shuddering synth-driven beats that have been called "space age" and "sex-drenched" by critics. It contains hip-hop influences. The song's beat consists mainly of synth loops from a Jam Pack from Apple's musical software GarageBand (Euro Hero Synth). Rap-Up likened the song to Lil Jon's song, "Lovers and Friends", on which Usher appeared, while Fraser McAlpine of BBC Radio 1 wrote that it features vague similarities to "No Woman, No Cry" by Bob Marley. According to the sheet music published by Hal Leonard Corporation at Musicnotes.com, the song is written in common time with a tempo of 70 beats per minute and follows the chord progression of C major–E minor–A minor–F major.

About.com's Mark Edward Nero wrote that "on the song, Usher talks about a lust so immediate, so powerful, that it makes him want to get down [and have sex] right then and there". The song's chorus consists of the hook, "I wanna make love in this club". Leah Greenblatt of Entertainment Weekly called the lyrics of the song "libidinous".

== Release and critical reception ==
Early in 2008, several songs for Usher's fifth studio album leaked into the Internet, including "Love in This Club". Usher called the incident an "internal conspiracy" because it was unofficially released beyond his awareness. This also happened to the lead single "Yeah!" off his 2004 album Confessions, which was intentionally leaked by its producer, Lil Jon, in 2003. Polow da Don later told that he had leaked "Love in This Club", echoing Lil Jon's actions. He felt the song would be a hit, but that "it was so much back-and-forth between Usher and his record label" and he was tired of waiting on "label politics". The song was released for sale on February 22, 2008.

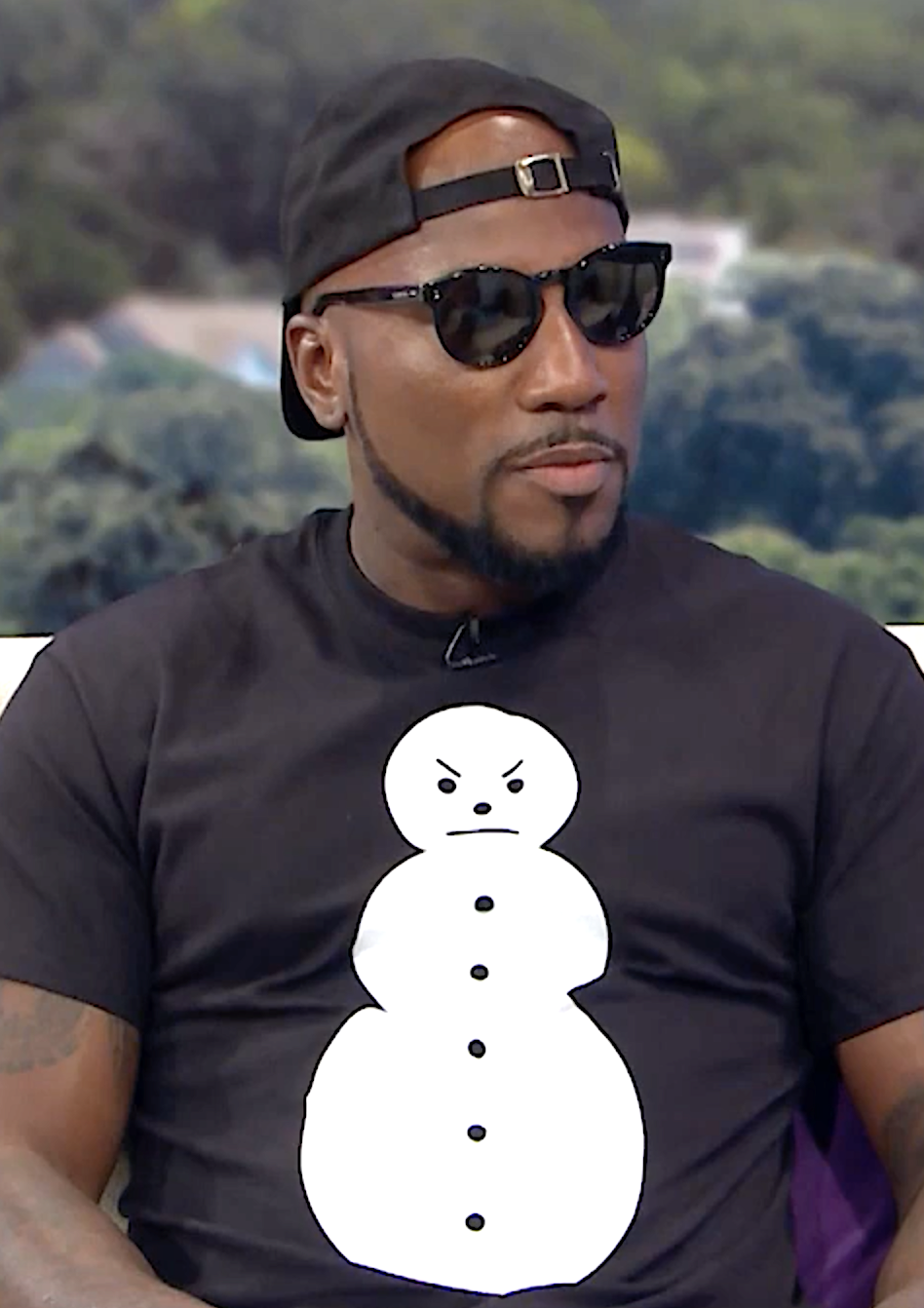
Rapper Young Jeezy's verse on "Love in This Club" attracted mixed reception from critics.

The production of "Love in This Club" was praised by the Los Angeles Times, as was Usher's vocal effort. Andy Kellman of Allmusic and Jonathan Tjarks of Austin360.com noted the song as a standout from Here I Stand. Blender rated the song two-and-a-half out of five stars, calling it too safe and lethargic. Digital Spy's Nick Levine enjoyed the song, but noted its lack of originality. Jim Farber from Daily News was not impressed, writing "'Love in This Club' doesn't sound like a club anthem at all. It's too slow and quiet, and...its smeary synth hook sounds like a planed-down version of a Justin Timberlake hit."

Young Jeezy's addition received clashing responses from reviewers. Billboard's Sophie Baratta was not impressed with the verse, but called the song "a catchy tune". Bill Lamb of About.com praised the rapper's effort, but expected better from Usher after a four-year break since Confessions, writing that he is "retread[ing] territory familiar to fans of Akon and T-Pain", awarding the song two-and-a-half out of five stars. BBC Radio 1's Fraser McAlpine rated the song four stars out of five, but called Young Jeezy's rap "growling" and "wheezy".

This single ranked at number one on the "10 Best Singles of 2008" list by American magazine Entertainment Weekly, while Time's Josh Tyrangiel placed it at number eight on its 2008 "Songs of Summer" list. MTV News listed the song as the fifth-best R&B tune of the year, and it won the Ozone Award for Best Rap/R&B Collaboration. On "The 50 Sexiest Songs of All Time", compiled by Billboard in 2010, "Love in This Club" placed at number twenty-seven. In 2016, Complex ranked the song number nine on their list of the 25 greatest Usher songs, and in 2021, American Songwriter ranked the song number three on their list of the 10 greatest Usher songs.

== Chart performance ==
"Love in This Club" debuted at number eighty-three on the Billboard Hot 100, on the issue dated March 1, 2008. The next week it moved to number fifty-one, due to high airplay. The song continued to receive many spins, and in its third week it reached the top of the Hot 100, gaining the 'Airplay Gainer' honor the same week. Replacing "Low" by Flo Rida and T-Pain, "Love in This Club" also sold 198,000 downloads in that week. On April 5, 2008, the song was again named the 'Airplay Gainer', however it was shifted from the number-one spot by Leona Lewis' "Bleeding Love", having spent three weeks atop the chart. It fell off on June 7, having spent twelve weeks in the top ten.

On the Hot R&B/Hip-Hop Songs, the song first appeared on February 23, 2008, at number fifty-one making it the highest debut of the week. On April 12, it replaced Keyshia Cole's "I Remember" at number one. After four weeks "Love in This Club" was moved from the top spot by Lil Wayne's "Lollipop". The song also reached number four on the Pop 100, and has been certified platinum by the Recording Industry Association of America (RIAA). On the year-end charts for 2008, it was ranked number eight on the Hot 100, number fifteen on the Hot R&B/Hip-Hop Songs and number thirteen on the Pop 100. It was also ranked number eighty-five on the 2000s' Hot 100 list, and number ninety-nine on the decade-end Hot R&B/Hip-Hop Songs. As of August 1, 2010, "Love in This Club" has sold 2,453,000 units, according to Nielsen Soundscan.

Internationally, the song reached the top ten of numerous singles charts. It reached number six on the Canadian Hot 100, number four on the UK Singles Chart, number eight on the Australian ARIA Singles Chart, number three on the Irish Singles Chart, and number five on the Japan Hot 100, and was certified silver by the British Phonographic Industry (BPI) and 2× Platinum by the Australian Recording Industry Association (ARIA). Having been certified gold by the Recording Industry Association of New Zealand, it also topped the New Zealand Singles Chart, replacing "No Air" by Jordin Sparks and Chris Brown on May 5, 2008. After one week it was removed by Brown's "Forever", and was certified platinum on June 1, 2008. The single also found chart success in Europe, reaching number three on the European Hot 100 Singles. In individual countries, "Love in This Club" attained top-ten places in Flanders, France, Germany, Norway, Slovakia, Sweden and Switzerland. It also appeared on the singles charts of Austria, Wallonia, Czech Republic, Denmark, Finland, Hungary, and the Netherlands. In 2008, "Love in This Club" sold 5.6 million digital downloads worldwide.

== Music video ==
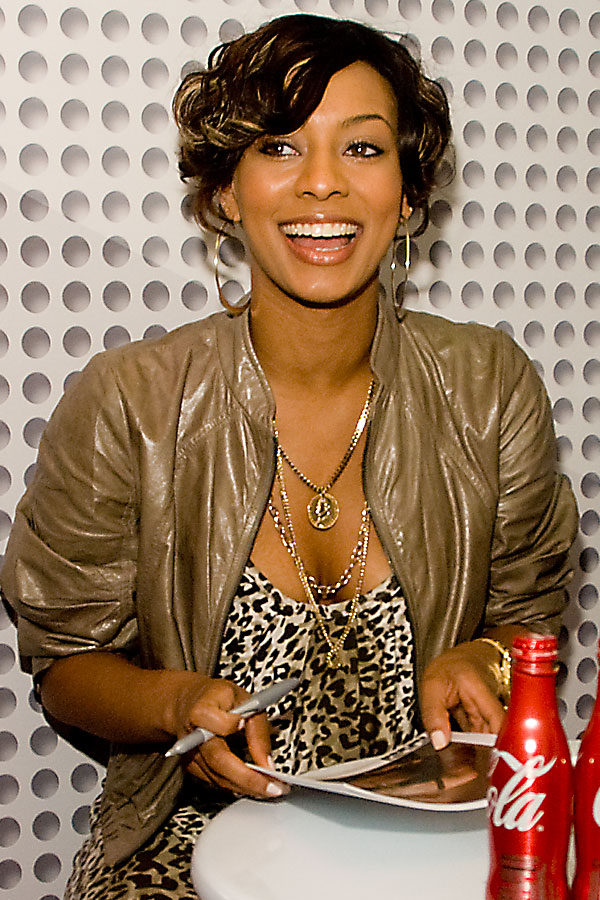
Keri Hilson played Usher's love interest in the tune's music video.

In February 2008 Usher said that the song's music video would be shot "very soon". Directed by the Brothers Strause, it features cameo appearances from Keri Hilson, Kanye West, Diddy, Nelly, Rick Ross and Robin Thicke. Hilson plays Usher's love interest in the video.

The music video starts with Usher waking up inside an empty nightclub. He calls out to see if anyone is there and sees Hilson, whom he follows into a room full of people dancing as a disc jockey starts playing music. Usher chases Hilson around the club, who at times mysteriously vanishes. The two dance intimately throughout the video at the club's bar, dance floor and lounge. Its choreography was likened to Janet Jackson's "Rhythm Nation" routine. The video concludes with the club burning down and Usher waking up in a valley. The storyline is continued in the "Moving Mountains" clip. During the video Usher is shown using a Sony Ericsson W350i Walkman, as part of Usher's endorsement of the company.

The music video premiered on MTV on April 7, 2008, and was the fourteenth-most streamed video on MTV.com in 2008, and was nominated as the Best Male Video at the 2008 MTV Video Music Awards. However, it lost to Chris Brown's "With You" video.

The music video on YouTube has received over 250 million views as of May 2024.

== Live performances ==
Usher sang "Love in This Club" with Young Jeezy at reality television show The Hills' third season finale on May 12, and again, by himself, at the finale of the sixth season of Dancing with the Stars on May 20, 2008. On June 23, 2008, at the opening of the 2008 BET Awards, Usher performed the song. Usher also appeared on television shows The Tonight Show with Jay Leno, Jimmy Kimmel Live! and Good Morning America, where he performed the song. Usher performed the song at the Super Bowl LVIII halftime show.

== Remix ==
A remix, "Love in This Club Part II", was released as the second single from Here I Stand in April 2008. Featuring vocals from R&B singer Beyoncé and rapper Lil Wayne, the sequel samples The Stylistics' "You Are Everything", and has a slower tempo than the original. It appeared on the Billboard Hot 100, the Hot R&B/Hip-Hop Songs, the Canadian Hot 100 and the ARIA Singles Chart.

== Track listings ==
CD Single and 7" Vinyl

1. "Love in This Club" – 4:19
2. "Love in This Club" (Instrumental) – 4:19

Maxi-single

1. "Love in This Club"
2. "Love in This Club" (Instrumental)
3. "Love in This Club" (Reavers remix)
4. "Love in This Club" (StoneBridge remix)
5. "Love in This Club" (music video)

12" Vinyl

1. "Love in This Club" (clean version)
2. "Love in This Club" (clean version without rap)
3. "Love in This Club" (instrumental)

Digital EP

1. "Love in This Club" – 4:19
2. "Love in This Club" (Reavers Remix) – 4:20
3. "Love in This Club" (StoneBridge Remix) – 9:04
4. "Love in This Club" (J Sweet Remix) – 5:08

== Credits ==
Credits lifted from the liner notes of Here I Stand.

- The Ambassadorz – keyboards
- Marcella Araica – mixing
- Miguel Bustamante – assistant mixing
- Darnell Dalton – writing
- Ryon Lovett – writing
- Polow da Don – writing, production
- Jeremy Stevenson – recording
- Lamar Taylor – writing
- Tony Terrebonne – recording
- Keith Thomas – writing
- Usher – writing, vocals
- Young Jeezy – writing
- Nico Solis – recording

== Charts ==
=== Weekly charts ===
Weekly chart performance for "Love in This Club"
Chart (2008)	Peak position
Australia (ARIA)	8
Austria (Ö3 Austria Top 40)	12
Belgium (Ultratop 50 Flanders)	5
Belgium (Ultratop 50 Wallonia)	13
Canada Hot 100 (Billboard)	6
Canada CHR/Top 40 (Billboard)	2
CIS Airplay (TopHit)	41
Czech Republic Airplay (ČNS IFPI)	16
Denmark (Tracklisten)	16
Europe (Eurochart Hot 100)	3
Finland (Suomen virallinen lista)	18
France (SNEP)	9
Germany (GfK)	5
Hungary (Rádiós Top 40)	30
Ireland (IRMA)	3
Japan Hot 100 (Billboard)	5
Lithuania (EHR)	21
Netherlands (Dutch Top 40 Tipparade)	2
Netherlands (Single Top 100)	47
New Zealand (Recorded Music NZ)	1
Nigeria (Media Forest)	34
Norway (VG-lista)	10
Portugal (Portugal Digital Songs)	1
Romania (Romanian Top 100)	15
Russia Airplay (TopHit)	71
Scottish Singles Sales (Official Charts)	2
Slovakia Airplay (ČNS IFPI)	6
Sweden (Sverigetopplistan)	8
Switzerland (Schweizer Hitparade)	9
Turkey (Billboard)	4
UK Singles (Official Charts)	4
UK Hip Hop/R&B (Official Charts)	2
US Billboard Hot 100	1
US Hot R&B/Hip-Hop Songs (Billboard)	1
US Pop Airplay (Billboard)	2
US Rhythmic Airplay (Billboard)	1

=== Year-end charts ===
Year-end chart performance for "Love in This Club"
Chart (2008)	Position
Australia (ARIA)	51
Belgium (Ultratop 50 Flanders)	55
Brazil (Crowley)	42
Canada (Canadian Hot 100)	24
Canada CHR/Top 40 (Billboard)	7
CIS (Tophit)	146
Europe (Eurochart Hot 100)	46
Germany (Media Control GfK)	63
Hungary (Rádiós Top 40)	94
Japan (Japan Hot 100)	32
New Zealand (RIANZ)	7
Russia Airplay (TopHit)	193
Sweden (Sverigetopplistan)	54
Switzerland (Schweizer Hitparade)	83
UK Singles (OCC)	13
UK Urban (Music Week)	6
US Billboard Hot 100	8
US Hot R&B/Hip-Hop Songs (Billboard)	15
US Pop 100 (Billboard)	13
US Rhythmic Airplay (Billboard)	4
Worldwide (IFPI)	8

=== Decade-end charts ===
Decade-end chart performance for "Love in This Club"
Chart (2000–2009)	Position
US Billboard Hot 100	85
US Hot R&B/Hip-Hop Songs (Billboard)	99

== Certifications ==
Certifications for "Love in This Club"
Region	Certification	Certified units/sales
Australia (ARIA)	2× Platinum	140,000^{‡}
Denmark (IFPI Danmark)	Gold	7,500^{^}
Japan (RIAJ)	Gold	100,000^{*}
New Zealand (RMNZ)	4× Platinum	120,000^{‡}
United Kingdom (BPI)	Platinum	600,000^{‡}
United States (RIAA)	5× Platinum	5,000,000^{‡}
United States (RIAA) Mastertone	Platinum	1,000,000^{*}
^{*} Sales figures based on certification alone.^{^} Shipments figures based on certification alone.^{‡} Sales+streaming figures based on certification alone.

== Cover versions ==
- The track was covered live by British band The Automatic and was released on the 2008 compilation Radio 1's Live Lounge – Volume 3.
- German group The Baseballs covered the song for their debut album Strike! in 2009.
- The track was also covered by American pop punk band, The Summer Set, on their second EP, Meet Me on the Left Coast. It was released in 2008 and titled 'L.I.T.C'.

== See also ==
- List of Hot 100 number-one singles of 2008 (U.S.)
- List of number-one R&B/hip-hop songs of 2008 (U.S.)
- List of number-one singles from the 2000s (New Zealand)
