= Lead single =

First single released from an album

A lead single (or first single) is the first single to be released from a studio album by an artist or a band, usually before the album itself is released and also occasionally on the same day of the album's release date.

A similar term, "debut single", is the first single released by a new artist.

== Release strategies ==
Artists often choose songs that are more up-tempo, yet representative of the album's sound, as lead singles. Such songs are often catchier and attract the attention of listeners. The subsequent single might then be slower in tempo, in order to demonstrate the range of the album. Female vocalists like Mariah Carey and Christina Aguilera often maintain a formula of an up-tempo first lead single with a slow ballad follow-up. For example, two singles were released by Miley Cyrus before her album Bangerz – an up-tempo track, "We Can't Stop", was released as the first, and a slow-ballad song, "Wrecking Ball", as the second. However, not all artists decide to choose their lead single with the up-tempo criteria. Artists may release a lead single that has a message they want to convey to listeners instead of a song with more commercial potential, such as Fall Out Boy who chose to release "This Ain't a Scene, It's an Arms Race" over the radio-friendly "Thnks fr th Mmrs".

Japanese artists such as Ayumi Hamasaki, Namie Amuro and B'z may release four to eight singles before their albums to achieve record-breaking debut-week sales. The lead singles in Japan are very heavily advertised and promoted, in some cases even more than the album itself. With album sales continuously declining in the United States, record labels often release singles before the album's release date to online music retailers including iTunes, ranging in price from $0.99 to $1.29. This trend has become increasingly popular in many markets.

In the late 2010s, artists began a trend of releasing multiple singles before eventually releasing a studio album. An unnamed A&R representative confirmed to Rolling Stone in 2018 that "an artist has to build a foundation to sustain" and adding that "When artists have one big record and go run with that, it doesn't work because they never had a foundation to begin with." The same article cited examples such as Cardi B, Camila Cabello and Jason Derulo releasing four or more singles before their album releases.

== Pre-release single ==
In the 2000s, a common trend developed to release a lead single months in advance of the album release date. It has equally become common for further singles to be released before the release of the album. For example, Usher issued the lead single "Love in This Club" four months before the May 29, 2008, release of Here I Stand. The second single "Love in This Club Part II" was released one month before the album release date. Another example is Justin Timberlake's 2013 album, The 20/20 Experience, which was released on March 19, 2013. The first single off it is "Suit & Tie", released two months before the album hit stores. One month before the release of the album, another single called "Mirrors" was released. Katy Perry released "California Gurls" as a single on May 7, 2010, and "Teenage Dream" on July 23, 2010, leading to the release of the album Teenage Dream on August 24, 2010. Ed Sheeran did something similar, releasing both "Shape of You" and "Castle on the Hill" as double lead singles from his album ÷, although these songs were both released on the same day, 6 January 2017. The 1995 Oasis single "Some Might Say" would go on to appear on the group's second album, (What's the Story) Morning Glory?, though at the time it was a standalone release, with "Roll with It" acting more as a lead single.

== Usage in South Korea ==
In South Korean music, the term "title track" is sometimes used interchangeably with "lead single". The term is used to describe an album's main promoted song, usually released on the same day as the album and promoted on South Korean music programs. This term is used regardless of the song's title or whether or not it was the first single from an album to be released. For example, "Boom Boom Bass" is considered the title track from Riize's 2024 extended play Riizing despite not sharing a title with the EP, nor being the first single released from the album.
