= Trading Places (song) =

Single by Usher

from the album Here I Stand
- Released: October 17, 2008
- Recorded: Music Line Studio, Triangle Sound Studios, Chalice Recording Studios
- Length: 4:29
- Label: LaFace
- Songwriters: Usher Raymond; Carlos McKinney; Terius Nash
- Producer: Los Da Mystro

Usher singles chronology
"Here I Stand" (2008)	"Trading Places" (2008)	"Better on the Other Side" (2009)

Music video
- "Trading Places" on YouTube

"Trading Places" is a song by American recording artist Usher. Released on October 17, 2008 as the fifth and final single from his fifth studio album Here I Stand, Usher wrote the song with The-Dream and Carlos "Los Da Mystro" McKinney. Produced by McKinney, it is a slow-tempo R&B ballad with hip hop influences, and focuses on the idea of role reversal in a relationship.

The song appeared on the US Billboard Hot 100 and Hot R&B/Hip-Hop Songs, peaking at numbers forty-five and four, respectively. A music video was filmed for the song, which demonstrated intimate sexual scenes, and promoted Usher's lingerie line. Usher performed "Trading Places" on both his One Night Stand: Ladies Only Tour (2008) and OMG Tour (2010–11).

== Background and composition ==
"Trading Places" was written by The-Dream, Carlos "Los Da Mystro" McKinney and Usher, and produced by McKinney, while Jaycen Joshua mixed the record. The song was recorded at Music Line Studio, Triangle Sound Studios and Chalice Recording Studios, and was released on October 17, 2008.

"Trading Places"
The song contains lyrics relating to sexual role reversal

"Trading Places" is a slow-tempo R&B ballad, and contains influences of hip hop music. McKinney used the drums that appear in J. Holiday's "Bed"; "Trading Places" also uses guitar instrumentation. The theme of the song surrounds role reversal in a relationship, predominantly in sexual situations, with its hook consisting of the lyrics, "I'm always on the top, tonight I'm on the bottom / 'cause we trading places". Usher described the song's idea as "wishful thinking for all men to have a woman who takes control and compliments us the way we compliment them", and Steve Jones of USA Today saw the song as a way for Usher to "satisfy his inner freak [...] within the confines of marriage." Angela Barrett of Rap-Up noted "Trading Places" as a male version of "Cater 2 U" (2004) by Destiny's Child.

== Critical reception ==
Digital Spy's David Balls gave "Trading Places" three out of five stars, and wrote that the song's lyrics "may be verging on the sickly, but Usher just about gets away with it." Joshua Alston from The A.V. Club wrote: "The guy's in love, so even on "Trading Places," when he talks about serving his woman a breakfast of toast with jelly and orange juice, it sounds sexy, not quotidian. A ball and chain has never given anyone such a lift." Mark Edward Nero of About.com called it "all-around excellent: the vocals, production and (especially the) lyrics all excel." Andy Kellman from AllMusic said that the song was the best of "the small handful of brow-raising moments" on Here I Stand. IGN's Chad Grischow criticized the song's production, calling it "a muddled mess." HipHopDX called the song a "low powered offering."

== Chart performance ==
"Trading Places" debuted on the US Billboard Hot 100 at number one hundred on November 15, 2008. The next week it moved ten places to number ninety. The song peaked in its seventh charting week, when it reached number forty-five on the final chart of 2008. "Trading Places" fell off the Hot 100 after seventeen weeks. The song was more successful on the Billboard Hot R&B/Hip-Hop Songs chart, where it entered at number ninety-six. On January 3, 2009, it climbed to its high position of number four, and slipped off the chart in April 2009 after thirty-three weeks.

== Music video ==
The music video for "Trading Places" was shot on September 9, 2008 in Venice, Los Angeles, and was directed by Chris Robinson. Of the video's concept Usher said, "We wanted to do something [...] very hot and very forward-thinking." The video also serves as his medium to introduce his new line of lingerie, with his love interest in the video wearing some designs.

In the video Usher and his love interest simulate sexual intercourse, with the woman maintaining dominance, echoing the song's theme. Interspersed are scenes of him playing the song on a transparent piano, sitting in a chair singing and dancing against a brick backdrop. In some of the sex scenes the camera is rotated 180 degrees, so that an illusion is given from Usher being "on the top" to being "on the bottom".

The music video on YouTube has received over 75 million views as of May 2024.

== Live performances ==
Usher performed "Trading Places" along with "Here I Stand" and "What's Your Name" at the warmup concert for the 2008 National Football League Kickoff game on September 4. Usher sang the song on his 2008 One Night Stand: Ladies Only tour. He began the song seated at a grand piano, while a female backup dancer removed Usher's shirt and, while wearing the shirt herself, lay on top of the piano.

He also performed "Trading Places" on his international OMG Tour, which commenced in November 2010, and concluded in June 2011. During the performance, he calls a female fan from the audience and sings to her as they dance seductively. This resulted in a mishap during a December 2010 performance at the Madison Square Garden when a fan tried to swing her foot over Usher but accidentally kicked him in the head. At the Glendale, Arizona show, he called American Idol season six winner Jordin Sparks onto the stage to perform the number with him. At one of the London dates, English singer Alesha Dixon accompanied him onstage for the performance.

== Track listings ==
Digital EP
No.	Title	Producer(s)	Length
1.	"Trading Places"	Los da Mystro; Harrell^{[a]}	4:29
2.	"Trading Places" (FP remix)	Los da Mystro; Harrell^{[a]}; FP^{[b]}	3:51
3.	"Trading Places" (Monk & Prof Remix)	Los da Mystro; Harrell^{[a]}; Monk & Prof^{[b]}	4:55

Spanish digital download
No.	Title	Producer(s)	Length
1.	"Trading Places"	Los da Mystro; Harrell^{[a]}	4:29
2.	"Trading Places" (music video)		4:27

Notes

- ^{^[a]} signifies vocal producer(s).

== Personnel ==
Credits lifted from the liner notes of Here I Stand.

- The-Dream – writing
- Kuk Harrell – vocal production, recording
- Carlos "Los Da Mystro" McKinney – writing, production
- Scott Naughton – recording
- Jaycen Joshua – mixing
- Dave Pensado – mixing
- Usher – writing, vocals
- Andrew Wuepper – assistant mixing

== Charts ==
=== Weekly charts ===
Weekly chart performance for "Trading Places"
Chart (2008–2009)	Peak position
US Adult R&B Songs (Billboard)	23
US Billboard Hot 100	45
US Hot R&B/Hip-Hop Songs (Billboard)	4
US Rhythmic Airplay (Billboard)	35

=== Year-end charts ===
Weekly chart performance for "Trading Places"
Chart (2009)	Peak position
US Hot R&B/Hip-Hop Songs (Billboard)	32

== Certifications ==
Certifications and sales for "Moving Mountains"
Region	Certification	Certified units/sales
United States (RIAA)	Platinum	1,000,000^{‡}
^{‡} Sales+streaming figures based on certification alone.
