= Love in This Club Part II =

Single by Usher featuring Beyoncé and Lil Wayne

from the album Here I Stand
- Released: April 28, 2008
- Studio: Hitland Studios, Alpharetta; Record Plant, Los Angeles
- Length: 5:09; 4:19 (B-side without Lil Wayne)
- Label: LaFace
- Songwriters: Raymond IV; Dwayne Carter, Jr.; Jamal Jones; Lamar Taylor; Jay Jenkins; Ryon Lovett; Keith Thomas; Darnell Dalton; Thomas Bell; Linda Creed; Keri Hilson
- Producer: Soundz

Usher singles chronology
"Love in This Club" (2008)	"Love in This Club Part II" (2008)	"Moving Mountains" (2008)

Lil Wayne singles chronology
"A Milli" (2008)	"Love in This Club Part II" (2008)	"Girls Around the World" (2008)

Beyoncé singles chronology
"Until the End of Time" (2007)	"Love in This Club Part II" (2008)	"If I Were a Boy" (2008)

Audio video
- "Love in This Club Part II" on YouTube

"Love in This Club Part II" is a song recorded by American R&B singer Usher, and features fellow singer Beyoncé and rapper Lil Wayne. "Love in This Club Part II" was released by LaFace Records on April 28, 2008, as the second single from Usher's fifth studio album, Here I Stand (2008). It is a sequel to the album's lead single "Love in This Club" which features Young Jeezy. Originally, vocalist Mariah Carey and rapper Plies were intended to feature on the record. Usher acclaimed the contributions of Beyoncé and Wayne, and called it "a really special record". Produced by Soundz, the track samples the 1971 song "You Are Everything" by the Stylistics.

The song appeared on the US Billboard Hot 100, the Canadian Hot 100 and the Australian ARIA Singles Chart. "Love in This Club Part II" also reached the top ten on the Hot R&B/Hip-Hop Songs, and its master tone received a Gold certification from the Recording Industry Association of America (RIAA). On February 9, 2024, the RIAA also confirmed this collaboration had been certified Platinum.

== Background and release ==
The original song, "Love in This Club", was sung by Usher, with guest vocals from rapper Young Jeezy also present. It was written by Usher, Polow da Don, Lamar Taylor, Young Jeezy, Ryon Lovett, Keith Thomas, Keri Hilson and Darnell Dalton, with da Don producing the track. The remix features additional writing from Lil Wayne, with Soundz producing the track. Usher said in an interview with MTV of the song, "I wanted it to be something that would be a surprise, be a shock. Have shock value. That's what the remix is all about." On working with Beyoncé, he said, "It's a treat for me. I've been wanting for years to do a record with Beyoncé. Even though it's a remix, it's a really special record for me". He also spoke highly of Wayne, dubbing him "one of the illest in the game". The song was originally intended to be sung by Usher with Mariah Carey and rapper Plies. While Plies had recorded two verses for the song, he and Carey did not appear on the final cut, with Beyoncé and Wayne featuring instead. Rumors also surfaced that R&B singer Keri Hilson would make an appearance on the tune, which she helped write. The song, one of the last additions to Here I Stand, was recorded at Hitland Studios in Alpharetta and the Record Plant in Los Angeles.

"Love in This Club Part II" was added for urban contemporary radio airplay in the United States on the week of April 28, 2008. A version without Wayne's verse appeared as a B-side to the CD single of "Moving Mountains", released on July 22, 2008.

== Composition ==
"Love in This Club Part II"
Lil Wayne's voice is modified with a vocoder in the song, which samples "You Are Everything".

The tempo of "Love in This Club Part II" is much slower than that of the original song. Idolator compared the slowing-down to the remixing of R. Kelly's "Ignition" (2002). Usher has said that he likes Part II more than the original. The tune samples the Stylistics' 1971 number "You Are Everything", written by Thom Bell and Linda Creed. The lyrics and theme of the song are similar to those of Part I, with Serena Kim of The Washington Post describing it as "mighty pressure coming from...male voices to persuade one woman to succumb to spontaneous sex", while Beyoncé portrays herself as a "hesitant but willing" voice of reason. Wayne's lyrics, modified through the use of a vocoder to make him sound intoxicated, are wily seductions to have his love interest have intercourse with him in the club's bathroom. During Wayne's verse, Usher sings breathy ad-libs. In the song, Usher refers to Beyoncé as "Queen B".

== Critical reception ==
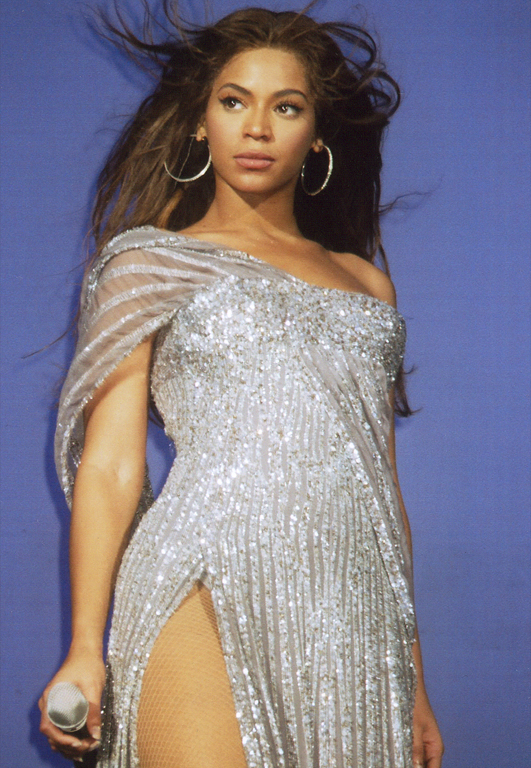
Beyoncé's appearance on "Love in This Club Part II" was generally praised.

Shaheem Reid of MTV News praised Wayne's vocals as a repeat of his melodic success on "Lollipop". YoRapper.com also appreciated Wayne's effort, saying "aside from sounding like he's dying, he delivers an entertaining verse." Stuff liked the way that his presence offered relief from the ballads on Here I Stand. About.com's Mark Nero lauded the song as being "much better than the original version", noting Beyoncé's appearance as "regal", while Idolator also praised the collaboration with Beyoncé and Wayne as "much better" than that with Young Jeezy, who recorded on the original track. Steve Jones of USA Today picked "Love in This Club Part II" as a standout track of Here I Stand.

However, Josh Eells of Blender was not impressed, writing that the song "manages to make two of the most desirable people on the planet [Usher and Beyoncé] sound chaste", while IGN's Chad Grischow called the record "bland" and "lacking at best". Simon Vozick-Levinson from Entertainment Weekly criticized Usher's pick-up lines, describing them as more ridiculous than in the original song, as well as Wayne's reusing of lyrics from both "Lollipop" and his remix of "Crying Out for Me" (2007) by Mario. On the other hand, Vozick-Levinson commended Beyoncé's vocal performance on the track. Joey Guerra of the Houston Chronicle said that Beyoncé's vocal was the clear standout on the song. The song was listed as 36 in the Rolling Stone's The 100 Best Song of 2008.

== Chart performance ==
"Love in This Club Part II" debuted on the United States Billboard Hot 100 at number seventy-nine on the issue dated May 10, 2008, due to high radio airplay and digital sales. It climbed the chart, reaching its peak position of number eighteen three weeks later. "Love in This Club Part II" slipped off the chart after twenty-two weeks. On the Hot R&B/Hip-Hop Songs, the song debuted at number fourteen the same week. It peaked on the chart at number seven on June 21, 2008, gaining the 'Digital Gainer' honor the same week. It gave Usher his thirteenth top ten song on the component chart and lasted thirty-four weeks on the chart. The song was among the Pop 100, where it peaked at number thirty-five. "Love in This Club Part II" was certified Gold by the Recording Industry Association of America (RIAA) on October 8, 2008, for sales of over 500,000 master tones. As of October 3, 2010, it has sold 366,000 digital music downloads in the United States, according to Nielsen SoundScan. On May 31, 2008, the song debuted and peaked on the Canadian Hot 100 at number sixty-nine, and fell off the chart four weeks later. In Australia, "Love in This Club Part II" debuted and peaked on the ARIA Singles Chart at number ninety-six on the chart dated June 9, 2008.

== Credits and personnel ==
Credits adapted from the liner notes.

Recording

- Hitland Studios – Alpharetta, Georgia, US
- Record Plant – Los Angeles, US

Musicians

- Usher – vocals, songwriter, executive producer
- Beyoncé – vocals, songwriter
- Lil Wayne – vocals, songwriter
- Keri Hilson – songwriter
- Mark Pitts – executive producer
- Karl Heibron – guitar
- Ray Holten – guitar
- Darnell Dolton – keyboards, songwriter
- Lamar Taylor – keyboards
- Jay "Jeezy" Jenkins – songwriter
- Ryon Lovett
- Polow da Don – producer, songwriter
- Keith Thomas - songwriter
- Linda Creed – songwriter
- Thomas Bell – songwriter
- Soundz – producer

Technicals

- Jeremy Stevenson – recording engineer
- Tony Terrebonne – recording engineer
- Marcella Araica – mixing engineer
- Karl Heibron – mixing engineer
- Brian Springer – mixing engineer
- Brian Stanley – mixing engineer
- Ant Palazzole – assistant mixing engineer
- Miguel Bustamante – assistant mixing engineer
- Chris Athens – mastering engineer

== Charts ==
=== Weekly charts ===
Weekly chart performance for "Love in This Club Part II"
Chart (2008)	Peak position
Australia (ARIA)	96
Canada Hot 100 (Billboard)	69
CIS Airplay (TopHit)	198
US Billboard Hot 100	18
US Hot R&B/Hip-Hop Songs (Billboard)	7
US Pop 100	35
US Rhythmic Airplay (Billboard)	10

=== Year-end charts ===
Year-end chart performance for "Love in This Club Part II"
Chart (2008)	Position
US Hot R&B/Hip-Hop Songs	46

== Certifications ==
Certifications for "Love in This Club Part II"
Region	Certification	Certified units/sales
New Zealand (RMNZ)	Platinum	30,000^{‡}
United States (RIAA) Mastertone	Gold	500,000^{*}
United States (RIAA)	Platinum	1,000,000^{‡}
^{*} Sales figures based on certification alone.^{‡} Sales+streaming figures based on certification alone.
