= Here I Stand (Usher song) =

Single by Usher

from the album Here I Stand
- Released: August 18, 2008
- Recorded: Sony Music (New York City); Zac Recording (Atlanta)
- Length: 4:10
- Label: LaFace; RCA
- Songwriters: Usher; Polow da Don; Adam Blackstone; Gerrell Gaddis; Dre & Vidal
- Producers: Dre & Vidal

Usher singles chronology
"What's Your Name" (2008)	"Here I Stand" (2008)	"Trading Places" (2008)

"Here I Stand" is a song by American recording artist Usher. It was sent to urban adult contemporary radio on August 18, 2008 by LaFace Records and RCA Records as the fifth single from Usher's fifth studio album of the same name. Penned by the singer with Polow da Don, Adam Blackstone, Gerrell Gaddis, and Dre & Vidal, and produced by Dre & Vidal, "Here I Stand" is a slow soul ballad and contains similarities to Stevie Wonder's music. The record was nominated for the Best Male R&B Vocal Performance award at the 51st Grammy Awards. "Here I Stand" maintained a position on the United States Hot R&B/Hip-Hop Songs for several weeks in 2008 and 2009, reaching the top twenty. It also appeared on the US Radio Songs and Bubbling Under Hot 100 Singles charts, peaking at numbers seventy-two and six, respectively.

== Background and composition ==
"Here I Stand"
The song incorporates soul which led to comparisons with Stevie Wonder.

"Here I Stand" was written by Usher, Polow da Don, Adam Blackstone and Gerrell Gaddis, as well as Dre & Vidal, who also produced the track. The song was recorded by Vincent Dilorenzo, with assistance from Geoff Rice, at Sony Music Studios, New York City and Zac Recording, Atlanta. Dilorenzo also mixed the record, with assistance from Matt DeSando, at Studio 609, Philadelphia. According to Josh Eells of Blender, "Here I Stand" was written for Tameka Foster, whom Usher married in August 2007. Composed before their engagement, "Here I Stand" was played at Usher and Foster's wedding, on Foster's request. The tune is an assurance of sexual fidelity and commitment. In an interview with MTV News, Usher stated, "If you listen to the words [of 'Here I Stand'], it is very heartfelt, simplistic, yet very soulful. ... It's a man's words to his woman: a vow to say that you are the one, and I'll be there for you." A slow jam soul ballad, "Here I Stand" has been compared to the work of Stevie Wonder by critics. It was included on Usher's fifth studio album of the same name, released on May 13, 2008, by LaFace Records.

== Release and promotion ==
The song was released to urban adult contemporary radio by LaFace and RCA Records on August 18, 2008, serving as the fifth single from Here I Stand. Usher sang "Here I Stand" along with "Trading Places" and "What's Your Name" at the warmup concert for the 2008 National Football League Kickoff game on September 4. Usher performed "Here I Stand" at Sony's keynote address at the 2009 Consumer Electronics Show. The song was performed on his One Night Stand: Ladies Only Tour, with a slower tempo.

== Reception ==
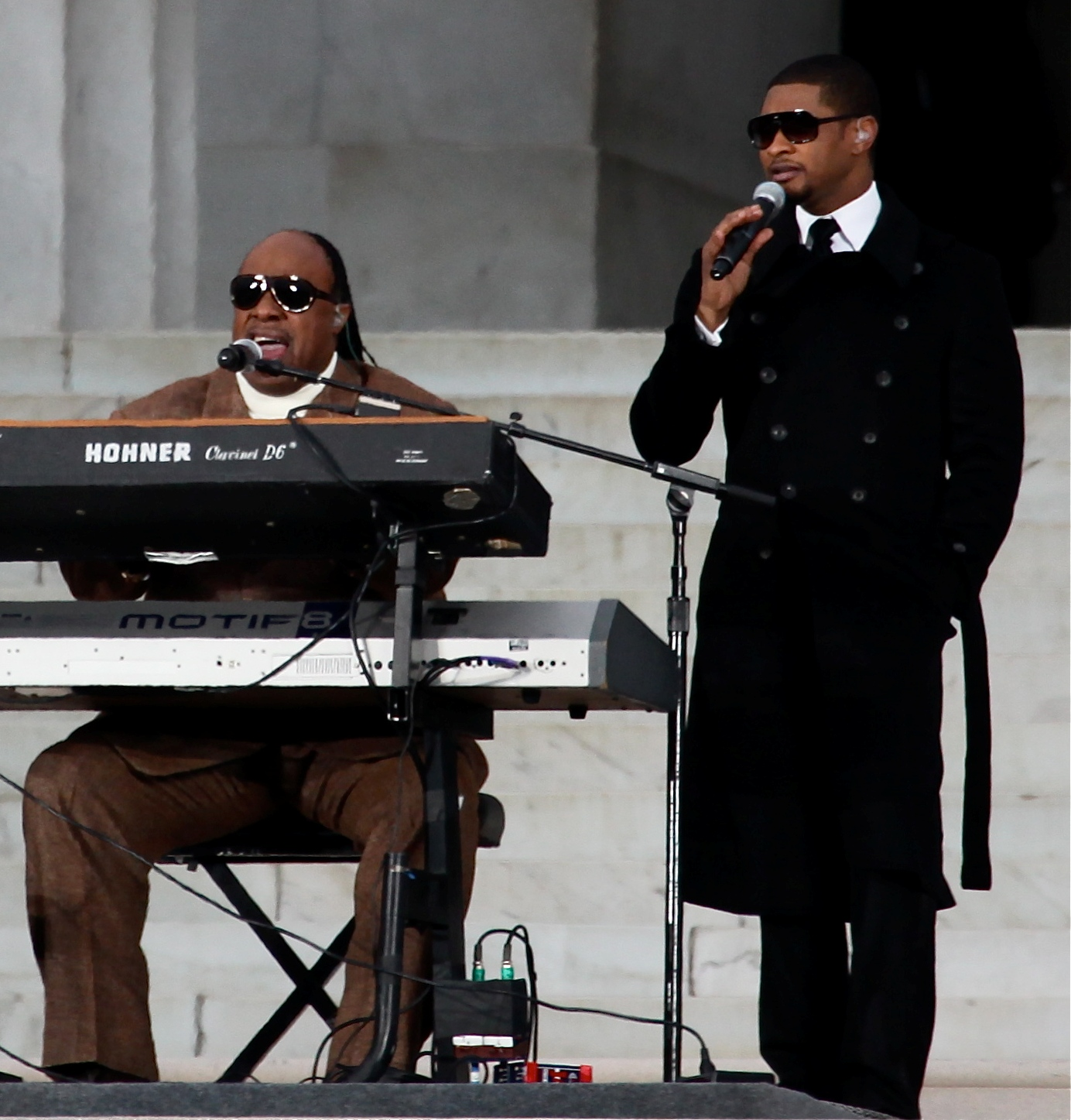
Stevie Wonder (left) and Usher performing in 2009

Leah Greenblatt of Entertainment Weekly called "Here I Stand" a throwback to Stevie Wonder, and was disappointed that it was placed near the end of the parent album. USA Today's Steve Jones noted the track as a highlight of the album. Joshua Alston from The A.V. Club wrote that the song "lyrically and musically sounds more passionate and more adult than Usher ever has," and called it a "syrupy ballad". However, Blender's Josh Eells called the "chivalrous" number "sweet but taxing, like looking at photos from someone else’s wedding," while Jim Farber of the Daily News wrote that "the [song's] melody fails [Usher]." The song ranked at number one on AOL Radio's list of top Usher songs. At the 51st Grammy Awards, "Here I Stand" was nominated for the Best Male R&B Vocal Performance award, but lost to Ne-Yo's "Miss Independent" from his 2008 album, Year of the Gentleman.

Following its radio release, "Here I Stand" debuted on the Hot R&B/Hip-Hop Songs at number seventy-five on the issue dated September 20, 2008, and peaked at number eighteen on March 14, 2009. On July 18, 2009, it fell off the chart, having spent forty-three weeks on the chart. "Here I Stand" entered the Bubbling Under Hot 100 Singles at number fourteen on the chart of December 17, 2008. It peaked at number six on January 3, 2009, before it slipped off the chart the following week, having lasted four weeks there. On February 7, 2009, the song appeared on the Hot 100 Airplay (Radio Songs) at number seventy-three, but failed to reappear on the chart the next week. It re-entered one place higher, at number seventy-two, on March 14, 2009, but again did not gain any traction, with no place achieved on the following chart. However, it became his first number one hit on the Adult R&B Songs chart on December 6, 2008.

== Credits ==
Credits lifted from the liner notes of Here I Stand.

- Adam Blackstone – writing, additional musician
- Matt DeSando – assistant mixing
- Vincent Dilorenzo – recording, mixing
- Dylan Dresdow – mixing
- Dre & Vidal – writing, production, all instruments
- Gerrell Gaddis – writing
- Mark Pitts – executive production
- Polow da Don – writing, additional musician
- Geoff Rice – assistant recording
- Usher – vocals, writing, executive production

== Charts ==
=== Weekly charts ===
Weekly chart performance for "Here I Stand"
Chart (2009)	Peak position
US Bubbling Under Hot 100 Singles	6
US Hot 100 Airplay (Radio Songs)	72
US Hot R&B/Hip-Hop Songs (Billboard)	18

=== Year-end charts ===
Year-end chart performance for "Here I Stand"
Chart (2009)	Position
US Hot R&B/Hip-Hop Songs (Billboard)	41
