= Moving Mountains (song) =

2008 single by Usher

Single by Usher

from the album Here I Stand
- B-side: "Love in This Club Part II"
- Released: May 23, 2008
- Studio: Triangle Sound Studios, Chalice Recording Studios
- Length: 4:58
- Label: LaFace
- Songwriters: Usher Raymond; The-Dream; "Tricky Stewart; Kuk Harrell
- Producers: The-Dream; Tricky Stewart

Usher singles chronology
"Love in This Club Part II" (2008)	"Moving Mountains" (2008)	"What's Your Name" (2008)

Music video
- "Moving Mountains" on YouTube

"Moving Mountains" is a song recorded by the American R&B singer Usher. It was released on May 23, 2008, as the third single from his fifth album, Here I Stand. It was written by Usher with Christopher "Tricky" Stewart, Kuk Harrell and The-Dream, and was produced by Stewart and The-Dream. "Moving Mountains" is a slow tempo ballad, with lyrics describing a love struggle.

The song appeared on the Billboard Hot 100 and Hot R&B/Hip-Hop Songs, as well as the single charts of several European countries. It reached number 6 in New Zealand on the singles chart and was certified Gold. The music video for "Moving Mountains" was filmed in front of a green screen as a sequel to the video of "Love in This Club".

== Background and composition ==
"Moving Mountains"
The song's chorus, demonstrating its slow tempo and Usher's use of falsetto

"Moving Mountains" was written by The-Dream, Christopher "Tricky" Stewart, Kuk Harrell and Usher, and produced by The-Dream and Stewart. Recorded at Triangle Sound Studios and Chalice Recording Studios, it was leaked in February 2008, before being officially released for sale on May 23, 2008.

"Moving Mountains" is a slow jam ballad, and contains synth beats and electronic influences. Portions of the song follow a chord progression used in OneRepublic's "Apologize". Partway through the song the beat is adjusted, while the musical instruments are accentuated. Usher's voice ranges from tenor to falsetto. The song's lyrics are of a "struggle to get through to his girl", and contain an extended metaphor, relating his fight for love to that of moving mountains, wishing for the situation to change. Fraser McAlpine from BBC called it "a cold, sad song with cold, sad lyrics".

== Critical reception ==
Leah Greenblatt called it "an easy pick" as a single, while Sal Cinquemani of Slant Magazine lauded it as "further evidence that Usher always delivers musically". "Moving Mountains" was dubbed by The Guardian's Rosie Swash "a marked improvement on the sex-pestery" of "Love in This Club", and the AbsolutePunk reviewer called it "one of Usher’s most impressive efforts to date", likening the song to Usher's 2004 single "Burn". However, while Alex Fletcher of Digital Spy was impressed with the technicalities of Usher's vocals, he found it "hard to take Usher completely seriously when he insists on wailing each line", advising Usher to "stick to party bangers in the future".

== Chart performance ==
"Moving Mountains" debuted on the Billboard Hot 100 at number 72 on the chart date June 14, 2008. It peaked at number 67 on August 2, 2008, falling off the chart two weeks later, after spending a total of nine weeks on the chart. The song is Usher's lowest-peaking song on the Hot 100. It fared better on the US Hot R&B/Hip-Hop Songs, where it peaked at number 18 and spent seventeen weeks on the chart. It placed at number 84 on the end-of-year R&B/Hip-Hop Songs chart. "Moving Mountains" reached number 56 on the Pop 100.

The song appeared on the UK Singles Chart in July 2008 at number 67, rising to peak at number 25. After thirteen charting weeks it fell off the chart. "Moving Mountains" was commercially well received in the rest of Europe, reaching the high point of number 22 on the European Hot 100 Singles. In individual countries, the song reached the Top 40 in Austria, Czech Republic, Germany, Ireland, Slovakia and Sweden. It also appeared on the Ultratop charts in both Flanders and Wallonia at number 20. The song also had chart success in Japan and Australia, reaching the high positions of thirty-three and thirty-six, respectively. "Moving Mountains" had the most impact in New Zealand, where it reached number 6 on the singles chart, and, on March 29, 2009, was certified Gold by the RIANZ for over 7,500 sales. The song ranked at number 47 on the New Zealand 2008 year-end Singles Chart.

== Music video ==
The music video to "Moving Mountains" was released on May 21, 2008. Directed by the Brothers Strause, it is a continuation of the video for "Love in This Club". The video was shot in front of a green screen.

The video begins with Usher exiting the club in which the "Love in This Club" video takes place, then shows a fiery transition into the next scene, showing the burnt-down club. As the song begins, Usher inspects the smoking ruins and imagines a woman in a shard of a broken mirror. He travels through a desert, and takes off his jacket to reveal a tight-fitting t-shirt, and again imagines the woman, this time in a desert pond. Upon reaching a mountain on which his love interest appears, Usher climb the mountain and rain starts to fall. When he reaches the top of the mountain, the rain clears to be replaced by snowfall. Usher finds that the woman is, yet again, merely an illusion. He opens a locket to reveal a portrait of himself and his partner, which freezes over and cracks. As the video ends, Usher kneels, and the mountains breaks around him, leaving a sole pillar for him to stand on.

Idolator noted similarities in some scenery between the music video and Madonna's "Frozen" video. It was placed at number 83 on BET's Notarized: Top 100 Videos of 2008 list.

== Personnel ==
Credits lifted from the liner notes of Here I Stand.

- Kuk Harrell – writing, recording
- The-Dream – writing, production
- Christy Hall – assistant production
- Jaycen Joshua – mixing
- Dave Pensado – mixing
- Christopher "Tricky" Stewart – writing, production
- Usher – writing, vocals
- Andrew Wuepper – assistant mixing

== Track listings ==
CD single

1. "Moving Mountains"
2. "Moving Mountains" (instrumental)
3. "Moving Mountains" (FP remix)
4. "Moving Mountains" (J Remy & BobbyBass Remix)
5. "Moving Mountains" (music video)

Japanese Remixes CD

1. "Moving Mountains" (radio edit) – 4:00
2. "Moving Mountains" (FP Remix) – 3:05
3. "Moving Mountains" (J Remy & BobbyBass Remix) – 4:33
4. "Moving Mountains" (Pokerface Remix) – 5:07
5. "Moving Mountains" (23 Deluxe) – 5:58

UK CD Single

1. "Moving Mountains" – 5:01
2. "Love in This Club Part II" (featuring Beyoncé) – 4:19

Digital EP

1. "Moving Mountains" – 4:57
2. "Moving Mountains" (Full Phatt Remix) – 3:06
3. "Moving Mountains" (Pokerface Remix) – 5:09
4. "Moving Mountains" (23 Deluxe Remix) – 5:58

Finnish Digital EP

1. "Moving Mountains" – 4:57
2. "Moving Mountains" (instrumental) – 4:57
3. "Moving Mountains" (FP Remix) – 3:05
4. "Moving Mountains" (Pokerface Remix) – 4:33

== Charts ==
=== Weekly charts ===
Weekly chart performance for "Moving Mountains"
Chart (2008)	Peak position
Australia (ARIA)	36
Austria (Ö3 Austria Top 40)	70
Belgium (Ultratip Bubbling Under Flanders)	20
Belgium (Ultratip Bubbling Under Wallonia)	20
Czech Republic (Rádio Top 100 Oficiální)	40
European Hot 100 Singles (Billboard)	22
Germany (GfK)	28
Ireland (IRMA)	26
Japan Hot 100 (Billboard)	33
Netherlands (Dutch Top 40 Tipparade)	13
New Zealand (Recorded Music NZ)	6
Scottish Singles Sales (Official Charts)	20
Slovakia Airplay (ČNS IFPI)	32
Sweden (Sverigetopplistan)	21
UK Singles (Official Charts)	25
UK Hip Hop/R&B (Official Charts)	4
US Billboard Hot 100	67
US Hot R&B/Hip-Hop Songs (Billboard)	18
US Pop 100 (Billboard)	56
US Rhythmic Airplay (Billboard)	30

=== Year-end charts ===
Year-end chart performance for "Moving Mountains"
Chart (2008)	Position
New Zealand (RIANZ)	47
UK Singles (OCC)	198
US Hot R&B/Hip-Hop Songs (Billboard)	84

== Certifications ==
Certifications and sales for "Moving Mountains"
Region	Certification	Certified units/sales
Australia (ARIA)	Gold	35,000^{‡}
New Zealand (RMNZ)	Gold	7,500^{*}
United States (RIAA)	Platinum	1,000,000^{‡}
^{*} Sales figures based on certification alone.^{‡} Sales+streaming figures based on certification alone.

== Release history ==
=== Purchase dates ===
Purchase dates for "Moving Mountains"
Region	Date	Format(s)	Ref(s).
Netherlands	May 23, 2008	Digital download	
Austria	July 18, 2008	Digital download	
Canada	July 18, 2008	Digital download	
Great Britain	July 18, 2008	Digital download	
Ireland	July 18, 2008	Digital download	
Spain	July 18, 2008	Digital download	
Finland	July 21, 2008	Digital download	
United Kingdom	July 21, 2008	CD single	
Australia	July 25, 2008	Digital download	
Austria	July 25, 2008	Digital download	
Belgium	July 25, 2008	Digital download	
Germany	July 25, 2008	Digital download	
New Zealand	July 25, 2008	Digital download	
Mexico	July 25, 2008	Digital download	
Sweden	July 25, 2008	Digital download	
France	July 28, 2008	CD single	
Germany	August 15, 2008	CD single	
Germany	August 15, 2008	Maxi-single	
Japan	August 20, 2008	Digital download	

=== Radio add dates ===
Radio release dates for "Moving Mountains"
Region	Date	Type(s)	Ref(s).
United States	June 9, 2008	Rhythmic airplay	
United States	June 9, 2008	Urban airplay	
