= Sony Ericsson W350i =

Mobile phone model

Sony Ericsson W350i, W350a, W350c
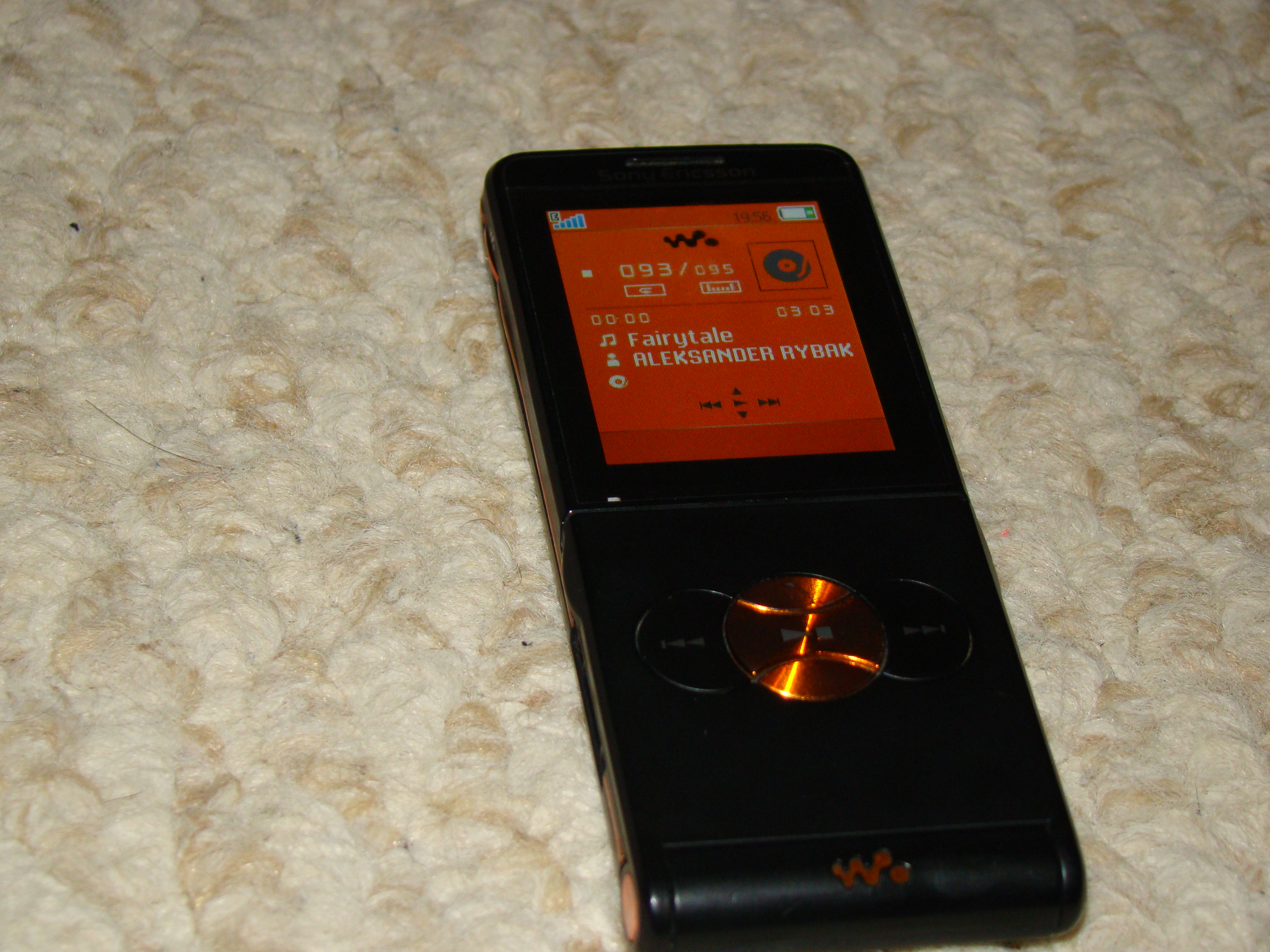
- Manufacturer: Sony Ericsson
- Series: Walkman
- Availability by region: 2008
- Compatible networks: GSM/GPRS/EDGE 900/1800/1900 for W350c/W350i, GSM/GPRS/EDGE 850/900/1800/1900 for W350a
- Form factor: Compact flip
- Dimensions: 104 × 43 × 11 mm, 104 × 43 × 10.9 mm
- Weight: 75 g, 80 g
- Operating system: Sony Ericsson proprietary OS
- Memory: 512 MiB (14 MB internal)
- Removable storage: Memory Stick Micro M2
- Battery: 750 mAH
- Rear camera: 1.3 megapixel
- Display: 1.9" 262,144 colors (176x220 pixels) TFT
- Connectivity: Bluetooth 2.0, USB 2.0
- Data inputs: Keypad

The Sony Ericsson W350 is a mobile phone that belongs to the Walkman series. It is available in three versions: W350i, W350a (for AT&T Wireless) and W350c.

The screen is a 262.144 color TFT at a resolution of 176×220. The W350a is 104.0 × 43.0 × 10.9 mm and weighs 80 g while the W350i and W350c are 104.0 × 43.0 x 11 mm and weigh 75 g. The colors available are available in Electric Black, Hypnotic Black, Ice Blue, Graphic White, Wisteria Purple, Turbo Red and Soft Pink.

The phone has 14 MB integrated memory and supports Memory Stick Micro (M2) add-in cards for music, photos, videos and other files.

The W350a supports GSM/GPRS/EDGE 850/900/1800/1900 while the W350i and W350c support GSM/GPRS/EDGE 900/1800/1900. The device also features FM radio, XM radio and Bluetooth wireless.

The defining features are centered on music and media. The phone has a built-in media player supporting browsing by artist and album, creating playlists, and purchasing songs online using PlayNow. Additionally, the phone includes TrackID which can identify the names of songs by listening to them.

The phone also has Internet software including RSS, a Web browser, WAP 2.0 XHTML, WAP 1.2.1, Web feeds, Access NetFront Web Browser and email. The phone supports SMS and MMS messaging with predictive text input.

Other features include a built-in photo-only camera, video viewing, Java support, a speakerphone, MP3/MIDI ringtones, a USB connection for computer syncing, a built-in modem for providing Internet access to computers, animated wallpapers, sound recording, a timer, task manager, stopwatch, phone book, games and notes.

The phone also features flight mode, which deactivates wireless broadcast and reception in order to allow users to access other features of their phone during flights.

It comes with the games Extreme Air Snowboarding, Guitar Rock Tour, and QuadraPop.

The Sony Ericsson W350a has a 1.48 W/kg SAR.

== See also ==
- List of Sony Ericsson products
