= Here I Stand (Usher album) =

Studio album by Usher
- Released: May 13, 2008
- Recorded: 2006–2007
- Genre: R&B
- Length: 74:10
- Label: LaFace
- Producers: Usher Raymond; Polow da Don; Tricky Stewart; will.i.am; Jermaine Dupri; Dre & Vidal; Bryan-Michael Cox; Stargate; Danja; James "JLack" Lackey; The-Dream; Jazze Pha; L.O.S.; Manuel Seal; DJ Toomp; Darkchild; J. R. Rotem; LRoc; WyldCard; Craig Love; Ne-Yo

Usher chronology
Confessions (2004)	Here I Stand (2008)	Raymond v. Raymond (2010)

Singles from Here I Stand
- 1. "Love in This Club" Released: February 22, 2008; 2. "Love in This Club Part II" Released: April 28, 2008; 3. "Moving Mountains" Released: May 23, 2008; 4. "What's Your Name" Released: August 18, 2008; 5. "Here I Stand" Released: August 18, 2008; 6. "Trading Places" Released: October 17, 2008

Here I Stand is the fifth studio album by the American singer Usher, released on May 13, 2008, by LaFace Records. Inspired by love for his then-wife—Tameka Foster—and son, Usher recorded many ballads for the album. Prior to the album's recording, Usher split with his mother, Jonnetta Patton, as manager and hired Benny Medina. Usher's estranged father died months before the release of Here I Stand; this also influenced themes of the album. It was originally to be titled Measure of a Man, but the singer named it Here I Stand to mark "a new chapter in life".

Usher promoted Here I Stand by performing on several television shows including Total Request Live, 106 & Park and Good Morning America. Among other concert appearances, he embarked on a One Night Stand: Ladies Only Tour, performing fifteen shows in November 2008. Six singles were released from Here I Stand: "Love in This Club", "Love in This Club Part II", "Moving Mountains", "What's Your Name", "Here I Stand" and "Trading Places". "Love in This Club", which features rapper Young Jeezy, topped the Billboard Hot 100 and New Zealand Singles Chart.

Here I Stand received generally positive reviews from music critics, who viewed it as a sign of growth and maturity from Usher, although others were unimpressed by the change in style from his 2004 album Confessions. It debuted atop the Billboard 200, and sold 433,000 copies in the US in its first week of release, and as of 2010, has sold 1.3 million copies in that country. The album also reached number one on the Canadian Albums Chart, UK Albums Chart and Australian Albums Chart.

== Background ==
In 2004, Usher's fourth studio album, Confessions was released, becoming the most-shipped album of the year in the United States. Before the album's release, he broke up with his girlfriend Chilli. In December 2005, he became romantically involved with stylist Tameka Foster; the two wed on August 3, 2007, although Usher's mother and manager, Jonnetta Patton, did not attend. Foster gave birth to Usher Raymond V later that year. In May 2007, Usher split with Patton as his manager. This prompted "gossip" that Usher had "fired" her because of his growing relationship with Foster. He denied the claims, saying, "I love my mother ... I decided not to fire, not get rid of, but to give [my mother] the ultimate compliment—to retire her to be a full-time grandmother." He continued by stating that the split was a mutual decision. It was speculated that Patton's dismissal was due to his engagement with Foster; Usher dismissed these claims on Total Request Live (TRL) in May 2008. In what MTV News' Shawn Adler called an "angry tirade", Usher stated, "My wife had nothing to do with me firing my mother — nothing like that, that's trash. I hear y'all talking crazy out there. She's a beautiful black woman. Stop. Stop talking. And I love her. Stop it." The outbreak was compared to Mariah Carey's unannounced 2001 appearance on TRL, when she handed out popsicles to the show's audience and performed a "striptease", while some fans noted Usher's speech as evidence that Foster was being controlling of Usher. Usher hired Benny Medina as his new manager; Medina said of Usher, "The thing that excited me most is the intense commitment to his art, his incredible professionalism and the fact that I feel as though he's just hitting a stride."

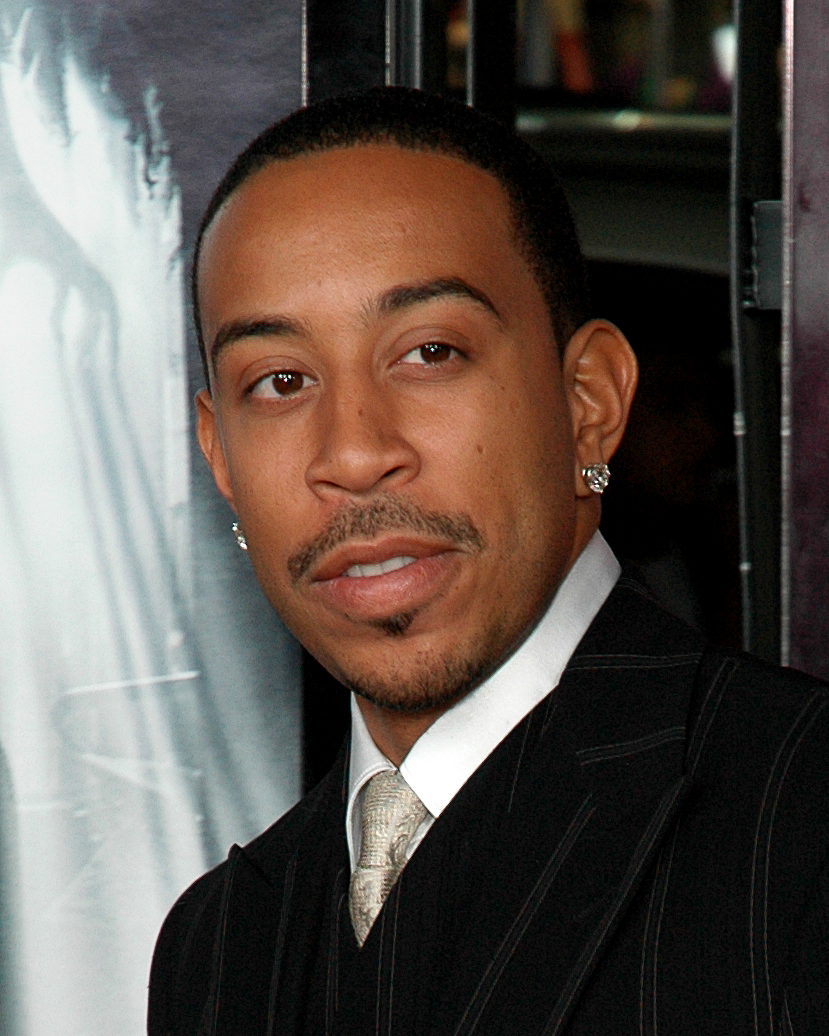
"Dat Girl Right There", which features Ludacris (pictured), was leaked in November 2007; however it was not included on Here I Stand

In January 2008, Usher's father, Usher Raymond III, died. Both men regretted not spending more time in each other's lives. "Prayer for You", the seventh track on Here I Stand, is an interlude dedicated to Usher's son, reflective on his relationship with his own father; "No matter what happened, my father always prayed for me. The only difference is, I'm gonna be there to be the father that my dad wished he was to me." The first album name that artists and repertoire representative Mark Pitts conceived was "Measure of a Man", but that title had already been used by Clay Aiken for his debut album, so Usher called it Here I Stand. Pitts said, "It was perfect because becoming a man is about going through pain, sorrow, and happiness. Usher's done that! From the love songs to the party joints, it's exactly the story he wanted to tell." Usher noted Here I Stand as beginning "a new chapter in my life"; the album's liner notes contain a verse from 1 Corinthians 13: "When I was a child, I spoke as a child, I understood as a child, I thought as a child: but when I became a man, I put away childish things." Here I Stand marked Usher's growth from boyhood to manhood. In March 2007, it was announced that work on the album had begun. Usher outlined the album's concept: "A lot of what I plan to offer with this album is kinda standing in this spot ... The king's back. I ain't gonna say 'back,' I never left."

The Rich Harrison-produced track, titled "Dat Girl Right There", was leaked on November 11, 2007. The song charted on the Billboard Hot R&B/Hip-Hop Songs at number 74, due to high airplay. Featuring Ludacris—with whom Usher collaborated on "Yeah!" in 2004—the song was originally thought to be the lead single from Here I Stand; however it was not included on the record. Other potential tracks cited before the album's release were "All the Time" (produced by T-Pain) and "The Realest" (produced by Jermaine Dupri), although neither was included on the album. Here I Stand contains eighteen tracks; James "JLack" Lackey, Polow da Don, Tricky Stewart, Jazze Pha, The-Dream, Los da Mystro, will.i.am, Dupri, Manuel Seal, LRoc, Dre & Vidal, Bryan-Michael Cox, Stargate, Ne-Yo, Danja, Soundz and J. R. Rotem all produced tunes on the album. On the iTunes Store deluxe edition, "Revolver" was included, which was produced by Alexander "Prettyboifresh" Parhm.

== Composition ==
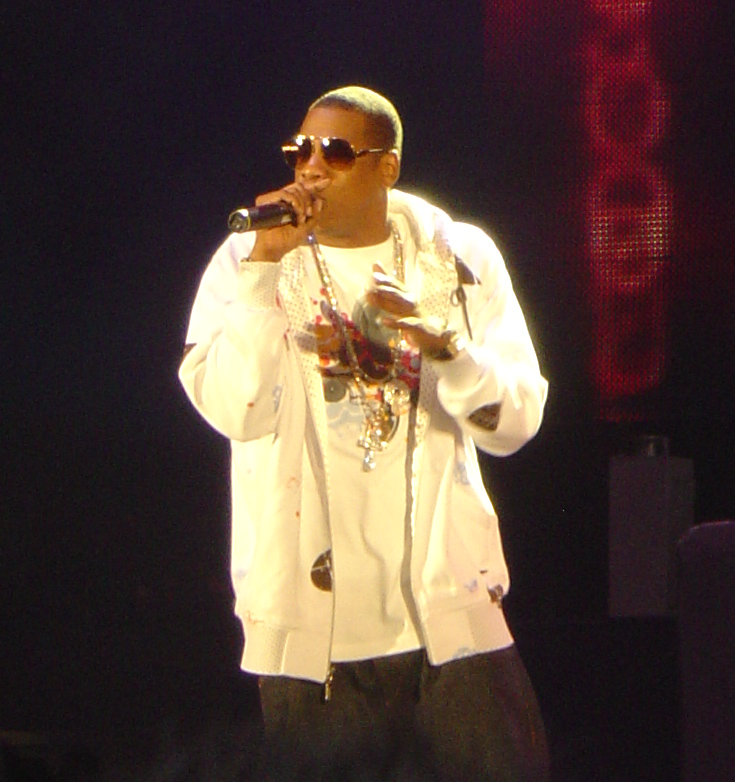
Jay-Z contributed vocals to "Best Thing"

"Love in This Club"
Here I Stand's mid-tempo lead single is based on a shuddering synth beat.

"Here I Stand"
The album's title track, a ballad played at Usher's wedding to Foster, draws from soul and pop jazz, which led to comparisons with Stevie Wonder.

Here I Stand is an R&B album, Josh Eells of Blender summed up much of the production of the album as "cocktail-lounge crunk, full of splashy cymbals, jazzy electric guitar and tinkly pianos". Many of its themes were inspired by Foster and Raymond V, resulting in a great number of ballads. Here I Stand opens with an "Intro" (titled "Forever Young" on some copies), while the lead single "Love in This Club" follows, on which Young Jeezy appears. The mid-tempo song features a shuddering synth beat and speaks of a lusting desire in a nightclub. "This Ain't Sex" is a disco-influenced song that "speaks of sex as a privileged act between two consenting adults". "Trading Places" uses guitar instrumentation to host role reversal in both sexual and non-sexual situations in a relationship. "Moving Mountains" is a ballad that draws on synth beats to relate a love struggle to an impossible task, such as moving mountains. The album's sixth track is "What's Your Name", an electro song which features new wave-influenced synths produced by will.i.am, who also contributes vocals to the song. The "Prayer for You" interlude follows, an ode to Usher's son in which Raymond V cries. Usher prays for his son to be "better than me". "Something Special" is a pop ballad that begins acoustically, and was inspired by Robin Thicke and John Mayer because of its honesty. Usher discussed the song: "It's about the feeling when you're in real love. It could be about my son or my wife."

According to Usher "Love You Gently", a piano-based classic rhythm and blues ballad, is "the one [track] you throw on with your significant other when it's time to get to it. This is why my son's here. It's a baby-maker." Jay-Z appears on the horn-founded "Best Thing", which is about transition to manhood. Usher outlines lifestyle changes since his wife's arrival and turns away from his days as "a hustler and a player" in "Before I Met You", which makes use of guitar and heavy drums. He is suspected of infidelity and compared to his girlfriend's cheating ex-partner on "His Mistakes". The thirteenth track on Here I Stand is "Appetite", which utilizes flutes and has Usher tempted to cheat on his wife. "What's a Man to Do" opens with a Native American call, while "Lifetime" contains influences of 1990s R&B. "Love in This Club Part II" features vocals from Beyoncé and Lil Wayne and samples The Stylistics' "You Are Everything" (1971); its lyrical content is similar to that of Part I, and Wayne's voice is modified through the use of a vocoder. The album's soul and pop jazz-derived title track, "Here I Stand", drew comparisons to Stevie Wonder. With a theme of commitment, it was played at Usher's and Foster's wedding. Here I Stand closes with "Will Work for Love", although it was placed as a hidden track on some copies; Sal Cinquemani from Slant Magazine called it "cute".

== Release ==
In November 2007, Usher hoped to release his fifth album, titled Here I Stand, but "issues in his personal life" delayed the album. According to reports, Usher has to spend more time with his then-pregnant wife. The expected November release date was booked to coincide with that of Usher's fragrance line. Released on May 13, 2008. The continually changing release dates became frustrating for Usher; Dupri said to Billboard, "The last couple [of] times I've been around [Usher], you could tell he's got the bug to hurry up and put this record out. He wants to get back out here and give the people that. He's got that itch." Here I Stand was first released by LaFace Records in Mexico and several European countries on May 13, 2008; releases in other countries followed.

== Promotion ==
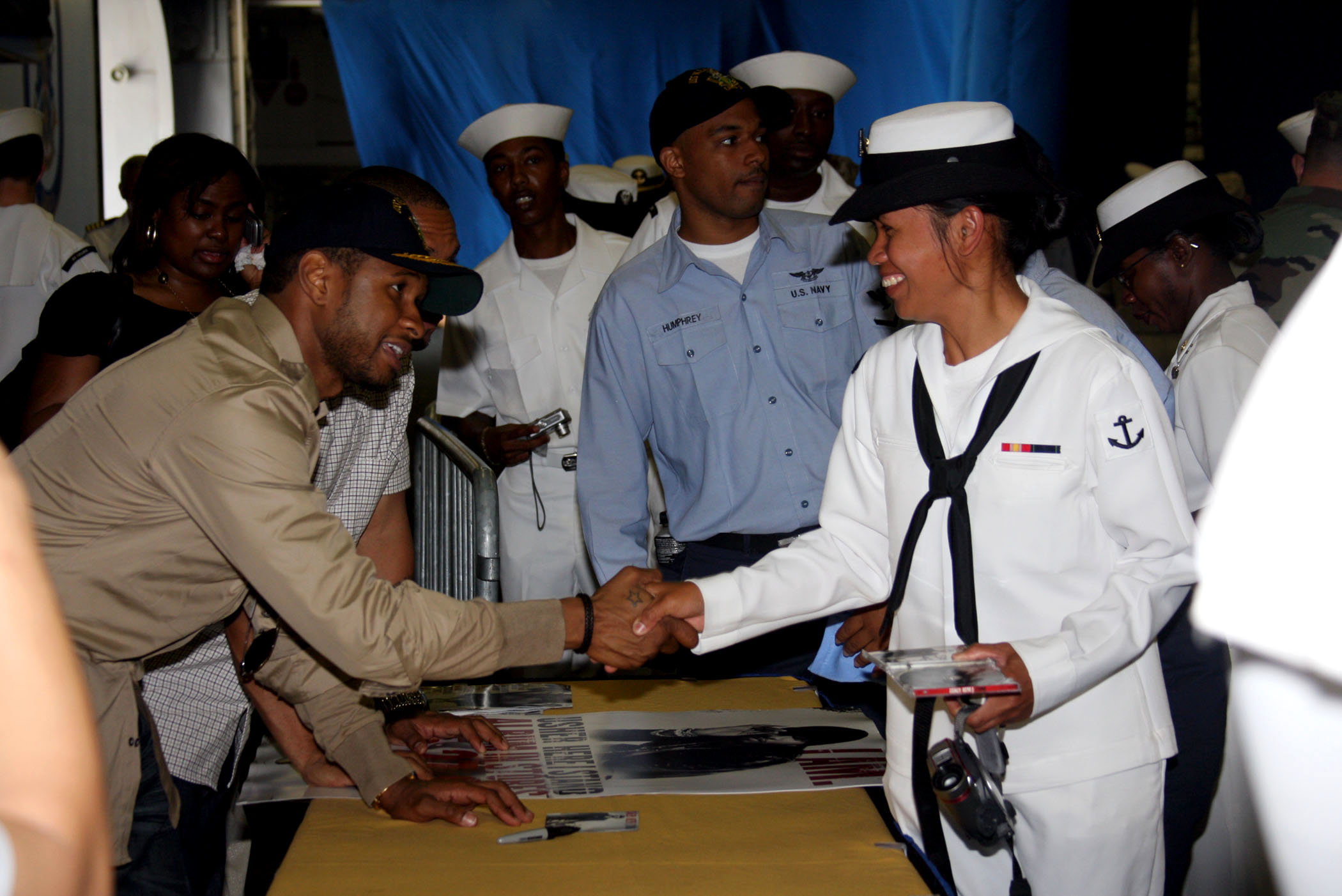
Usher signing copies of Here I Stand aboard the USS Kearsarge on Fleet Week

In 2008, Usher promoted Here I Stand by appearing at Radio 1's Big Weekend, where he performed "This Ain't Sex", "Moving Mountains", "What's Your Name", "Here I Stand" and "Love in This Club", as well as singles from his previous albums. Usher performed "Love in This Club" with Young Jeezy on The Hills' third season finale (May 12, 2008), and along with "This Ain't Sex" on Saturday Night Live (May 17, 2008), and again on the sixth season finale of Dancing with the Stars (May 20, 2008). Usher performed a one-off showcase concert for 1,500 fans at indigO2, London on May 22, 2008, for which the tickets were allocated by ballot. Usher signed copies of Here I Stand for the military during Fleet Week in New York City, aboard USS Kearsarge on May 27, 2008. On the day of the album's release, Usher appeared on television shows TRL and 106 & Park, and performed on Good Morning America on May 30, 2008. Usher performed "Love in This Club" on The Tonight Show with Jay Leno and Jimmy Kimmel Live!, on June 4, 2008. At the BET Awards, hosted on June 23, 2008, Usher opened the show, performing the single again. On September 4, 2008, Usher performed "Here I Stand", "Trading Places" and "What's Your Name" at the 2008's National Football League Kickoff game at Columbus Circle, New York City. Natasha Bedingfield and Keith Urban also sang before the game, which saw the Washington Redskins play the New York Giants.

=== Tour ===
One Night Stand: Ladies Only
- Tour by Usher
- Promotional poster for the tour
- Associated album: Here I Stand
- Start date: November 2, 2008
- End date: November 25, 2008
- Legs: 1
- No. of shows: 15 in North America

Usher concert chronology
- Truth Tour (2004); One Night Stand: Ladies Only (2008); OMG Tour (2010–11)

The One Night Stand: Ladies Only was the third concert tour by American recording artist Usher. The tour promotes Raymond's fifth studio album, Here I Stand (2008).

==== Background ====
Usher toured fourteen cities in North America. Mainly targeting women, the tour commenced on November 2, 2008 and concluded on November 25, 2008. The tour's female-focused concept was inspired by other male recording artists who "did things special like this for their female fans", such as Teddy Pendergrass, Marvin Gaye and Prince. Enjoying the challenge of a female-only tour, Usher said, "There [are] only a few artists that can pull that off, I feel like I've had such a connection with my audience. This album, I felt like, was definitely the type of one that was more intimate. So what better way to get up close and personal than to make it all women?" Usher performed the tour with a Dsquared^{2} wardrobe. At each show, one fan was brought onstage "for an even more intimate experience with the singer". This took place during "Superstar"; a female fan was served champagne and strawberries by Usher while sitting on his lap as he sang to her. Among Usher's own songs, the setlist also included portions of Stevie Wonder's "Rocket Love", Gaye's "I Want You" and Prince's "Do Me, Baby". At the Detroit show, he also performed a rendition of T-Baby's "It's So Cold in the D". Usher was supported by a five-piece band, three backing vocalists and four backup dancers.

==== Setlist ====
The following setlist was obtained from the concert held on November 3, 2008, at the Hammerstein Ballroom in New York City, New York. It does not necessarily represent all concerts for the duration of the tour.

1. "Forever Young"
2. "Love in this Club"
3. "Follow Me"
4. "U Remind Me"
5. "This Ain't Sex"
6. "That's What It's Made For"
7. "U Got It Bad"
8. "Trading Places"
9. "Do Me, Baby"/"Adore"
10. "Seduction"
11. "Nice & Slow"
12. "Dot Com"
13. "Rocket Love"
14. "Superstar"
15. "Bad Girl"
16. "You Make Me Wanna..."
17. "I Don't Know"
18. "I Want You"
19. "Confessions Part II"
20. "Medley" ("My Boo"/"Back in the Day"/"Think of You"/"I Need a Girl"/"Can U Get Wit It"/"Lovers & Friends")
21. "That's What It's Made For"
22. "Yeah!"
23. "Here I Stand"

Encore

24. "Caught Up"

==== Tour dates ====
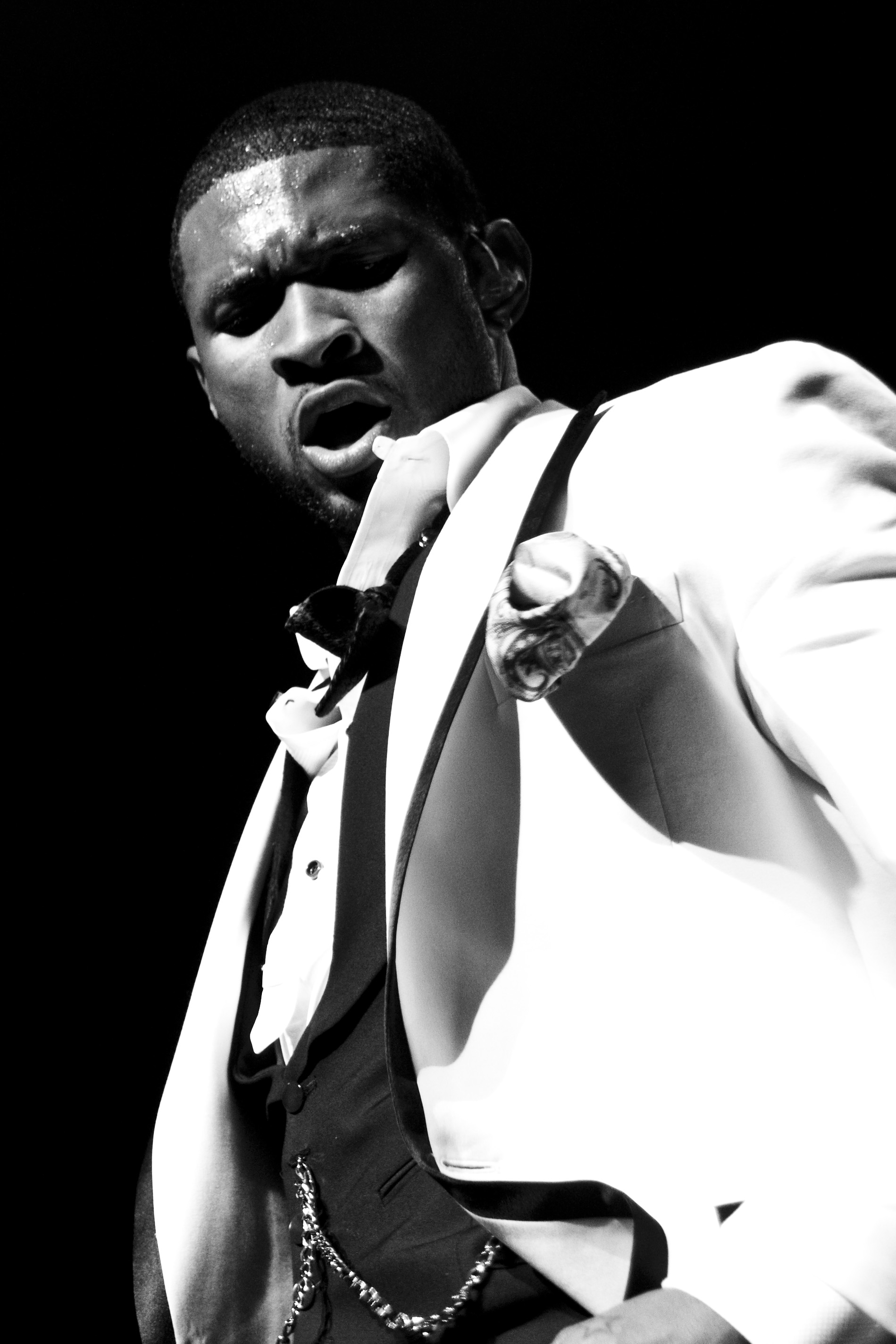
Usher performing in San Francisco at the Warfield Theatre

Date	City	Country	Venue
North America
November 2, 2008	Atlantic City	United States	Borgata Event Center
November 3, 2008	New York City	United States	Hammerstein Ballroom
November 4, 2008	Washington, D.C.	United States	Warner Theatre
November 5, 2008	Philadelphia	United States	Electric Factory
November 7, 2008	Ledyard	United States	MGM Grand Theater
November 8, 2008	Toronto	Canada	Kool Haus
November 10, 2008	Atlanta	United States	The Tabernacle
November 12, 2008	Detroit	United States	The Fillmore Detroit
November 13, 2008	Chicago	United States	House of Blues
November 18, 2008	San Francisco	United States	Warfield Theatre
November 19, 2008	Los Angeles	United States	Club Nokia
November 20, 2008	Los Angeles	United States	Club Nokia
November 21, 2008	Las Vegas	United States	Pearl Concert Theater
November 24, 2008	Houston	United States	House of Blues
November 25, 2008	Dallas	United States	House of Blues

==== Reception ====
Sun Media's Jason MacNeil rated the Toronto show three-and-a-half stars out of five, praising Usher's connection with the female audience. Lee Hildebrand of the San Francisco Chronicle commended Usher's live vocal ability. Parimal M. Rohit from Buzzine stated in his positive review of the Los Angeles show that "everyone will be talking about the entertaining concert".

== Singles ==
Five singles were released from Here I Stand. "Love in This Club" was leaked in early 2008 by its producer, Polow da Don, prior to its release on February 22, 2008. The song topped the US Billboard Hot 100, the Hot R&B/Hip-Hop Songs and the New Zealand Singles Chart, while reaching the top ten of numerous other record charts. It was certified five-times platinum in the United States and platinum in New Zealand. A sequel was created, titled "Love in This Club Part II" with Beyoncé & Lil Wayne, and was sent to radio as the album's second single on April 28, 2008. While it did not have the commercial success of the original, it emerged on the Hot 100, the Hot R&B/Hip-Hop Songs, the Canadian Hot 100, and the ARIA Singles Chart, and received a platinum certification from the RIAA.

"Moving Mountains" was released on May 23, 2008. It appeared on multiple singles charts outside the top twenty. However, it peaked at number six on the New Zealand Singles Chart, and was certified gold by the Recording Industry Association of New Zealand on March 29, 2009. The fourth single to be released from Here I Stand was "What's Your Name"; it impacted radio on August 18, 2008. "What's Your Name" charted on the Canadian Hot 100 and the ARIA Singles Chart, where it peaked at numbers eighty-four and ninety-one, respectively. "Here I Stand" was released to urban adult contemporary radio on August 18, 2008, managing to peak at number 18 on the Hot R&B/Hip-Hop Songs chart. The album's final single, "Trading Places", was released on October 17, 2008 and reached number forty-five on the Hot 100 and number four on the Hot R&B/Hip-Hop Songs.

== Critical reception ==
Professional ratings
Aggregate scores
Source	Rating
Metacritic	65/100
Review scores
Source	Rating
AllMusic	3.5/5 stars
The A.V. Club	B
Blender	3/5 stars
Chicago Sun-Times	3.5/4 stars
Entertainment Weekly	B+
Los Angeles Times	3/4 stars
The Observer	1/5 stars
Rolling Stone	2.5/5 stars
Slant Magazine	2.5/5 stars
USA Today	3.5/4 stars

Here I Stand received generally positive reviews from music critics. At Metacritic, which assigns a weighted mean rating out of 100 to reviews from mainstream critics, the album received a score of 65 out of 100, based on fifteen reviews. Mark Edward Nero of About.com gave the album four out of five stars, and wrote that Usher's marriage had a positive effect on his music. He called Here I Stand "as good - if not better" than Confessions. IGN critic Chad Grischow wrote that "Growing up may have taken toll on Usher's personal life, but it has not altered the man's ability to create refreshing music"; Grischow rated the album 8.1 out of 10. USA Today praised the maturity of Usher's lyrics on Here I Stand, while The A.V. Club's Joshua Alston commended the album's ballads. Although she disliked the album's length and lyrics, Entertainment Weekly's Leah Greenblatt wrote that "a good portion of [Here I] Stand's tunes deserve a place in the dance-floor pantheon", and awarded it a B+ grade. Andy Kellman from Allmusic scored the record three-and-a-half stars out of five and stated that "the album leaves no doubt that the R&B male crown ... should not change hands", referring to Usher's King of R&B honorific nickname. Richard Cromelin of the Los Angeles Times did not appreciate the numerous ballads on the release, but compared it to Usher's previous work and declared, "it's a more accomplished version of Confessions, the hooks more effortless, the singing even better, the songwriting more consistent." Jim DeRogatis from the Chicago Sun-Times viewed it as proof that Usher has claimed the 'King of R&B' title from R. Kelly.

However, Dan Gennoe of Yahoo! Music felt that the album lacked inspiration, and wrote, "nothing sticks, there's no guts, no depth and no matter how much he protests to the contrary, nothing to believe". Rolling Stone's Melissa Maerz perceived that Usher had put little effort into the record and stated that "now that he's got the American Dream, he sounds like he's stopped trying." Blender's Josh Eells was let down by the large number of ballads and lack of sexual content. Clover Hope of The Village Voice described it as "pure grown-man bidness" and "a little too sitting-on-the-dock-of-the-bay for Chris Breezy–trained earbuds". Sal Cinquemani from Slant Magazine scored Here I Stand two-and-a-half stars out of five, and considered the music "almost always just one notch above mediocrity." The Observer's Steve Yates panned the album as "gloop [Usher] wades through". In his consumer guide for MSN Music, critic Robert Christgau cited the songs "Trading Places" and "Best Thing" as "choice cuts", indicating "good song[s] on an album that isn't worth your time or money". Jon Pareles of The New York Times wrote that "tension, not bliss, creates the album's best songs", referring to "Moving Mountains", "His Mistakes", "Appetite" and "What's a Man To Do". At the 51st Grammy Awards, the album's title track was nominated for the Best Male R&B Vocal Performance award, but lost to Ne-Yo's "Miss Independent" from his 2008 album, Year of the Gentleman.

== Commercial performance ==
Here I Stand had unweighted first-day sales of 146,000 in the US, and in its first three days of release sold an unweighted 267,000 units. The album debuted at number one on the Billboard 200 chart. Selling 433,000 copies domestically in its first week of release, it was the second highest selling US debut of the year at the time, behind Mariah Carey's E=MC^{2}. In its second week of release, it sold 145,000 copies and dropped to number three on the Billboard 200. As at May 2012 it had sold 1,308,000 copies in the United States, and it has received a two-times platinum certification from the Recording Industry Association of America (RIAA). Here I Stand also debuted atop the Canadian Albums Chart, and spent eight weeks on the chart.

On the UK Albums Chart, Here I Stand debuted at number one on the chart of June 7, 2008, selling 56,897 copies. It was certified gold by the British Phonographic Industry (BPI), and lasted seventeen weeks in the chart before dropping out. The album peaked at number two on the Irish Albums Chart, remaining for fifteen weeks in the chart and was awarded a gold certification from the Irish Recorded Music Association (IRMA). In mainland Europe, the album was received well; it appeared at number three on the European Top 100 Albums, and reached the top ten in the Belgian Ultratop charts of both Flanders and Wallonia, as well as in the album charts of France, Germany, the Netherlands and Switzerland. In Oceania, Here I Stand attained a number-one position on the Australian Albums Chart and reached number five on the New Zealand Albums Chart. It received a gold certification from the Australian Recording Industry Association (ARIA), denoting shipments of 35,000 copies in the country.

== Aftermath ==
Usher's publicist, Patti Webster, resigned on August 1, 2008. Usher rehired Patton as his manager on August 6, 2008 and "dissolved his management arrangement with Benny Medina". At the time of the split from Medina, Here I Stand had sold two million copies worldwide compared to Confessions' fifteen million copies; some speculated that the disunion was because of the poorer album sales. Medina said that he and the singer "parted ways amicably", and deflected comments that he was responsible for the lower album sales. He pointed out that Here I Stand and "Love in This Club" reached number one on the US charts, and that the music industry had changed since the release of Confessions.

Usher filed for divorce from Foster in June 2009, stating that their marriage was "irretrievably broken". "Papers", the first single from Usher's next album Raymond v. Raymond (2010), discussed the divorce process, although it was recorded before the couple split.

== Track listing ==
No.	Title	Writer(s)	Producer(s)	Length
1.	"Intro"	Usher Raymond IV; Ryon Lovett; James "JLack" Lackey	Lackey	1:28
2.	"Love in This Club" (featuring Young Jeezy)	Raymond IV; Jamal Jones; Lamar Taylor; Jay Jenkins; Lovett; Keith Thomas; Darnell Dalton	Polow da Don	4:19
3.	"This Ain't Sex"	Raymond IV; Christopher "Tricky" Stewart; Phalon Alexander; Terius Nash	Tricky Stewart; Jazze Pha; The-Dream^{[a]}; Kuk Harrell^{[b]}	4:24
4.	"Trading Places"	Raymond IV; Carlos McKinney; Nash	Los da Mystro; Harrell^{[b]}	4:28
5.	"Moving Mountains"	Raymond IV; Stewart; Nash; Thaddis Harrell	Tricky Stewart; The-Dream; Harrell^{[b]}	4:58
6.	"What's Your Name" (featuring will.i.am)	Raymond IV; William Adams; Ryan Toby	will.i.am; Harrell^{[b]}	3:58
7.	"Prayer for You (Interlude)"			1:43
8.	"Something Special"	Raymond IV; Jermaine Dupri; James Phillips; Manuel Seal; Johntá Austin	Dupri; Seal^{[a]}; LRoc^{[a]}	3:57
9.	"Love You Gently"	Raymond IV; Andre Harris; Vidal Davis; Raheem DeVaughn	Harris; Davis	3:39
10.	"Best Thing" (featuring Jay-Z)	Raymond IV; Dupri; Austin; Seal; Shawn Carter	Dupri; Seal^{[a]}	3:54
11.	"Before I Met You"	Raymond IV; Bryan-Michael Cox; Austin; Kasseem Dean; Craig Love	Cox; Kendrick "Wyldcard" Dean^{[c]}; Love^{[c]}; Austin^{[b]}	4:56
12.	"His Mistakes"	Raymond IV; Shaffer Smith, Jr.; Mikkel Storleer Eriksen; Tor Erik Hermansen	StarGate; Ne-Yo^{[a]}	4:59
13.	"Appetite"	Raymond IV; Nathaniel Hills; Balewa Muhammad; Candice Nelson; Ezekiel Lewis; Brian Casey; Dupri; Seal; Marcella Araica	Danja	3:58
14.	"What's a Man to Do"	Raymond IV; Austin; Eriksen; Hermansen	StarGate	4:09
15.	"Lifetime"	Raymond IV; Lovett; Lackey	Lackey	4:36
16.	"Love in This Club Part II" (featuring Lil Wayne and Beyoncé)	Raymond IV; Dwayne Carter, Jr.; Keri Hilson; Jones; Taylor; Jenkins; Lovett; Thomas; Dalton; Thomas Bell; Linda Creed	Soundz	5:09
17.	"Here I Stand"	Raymond IV; Harris; Davis; Adam Blackstone; Gerrell Gaddis	Harris; Davis	4:10
18.	"Will Work for Love" (hidden track in some locations)	Raymond IV; J.R. Rotem; James Fauntleroy II	J.R. Rotem	3:16

Japanese edition
No.	Title	Writer(s)	Producer(s)	Length
1.	"Forever Young"	Raymond IV; Lovett; Lackey	Lackey	4:20
2.	"Love in This Club" (featuring Young Jeezy)	Raymond IV; Jones; Taylor; Jenkins; Lovett; Thomas; Dalton	Polow da Don	4:19
3.	"This Ain't Sex"	Raymond IV; Stewart; Alexander; Nash	Tricky Stewart; Jazze Pha; The-Dream^{[a]}; Kuk Harrell^{[b]}	4:24
4.	"Trading Places"	Raymond IV; McKinney; Nash	Los da Mystro; Harrell^{[b]}	4:28
5.	"Moving Mountains"	Raymond IV; Stewart; Nash; Harrell	Tricky Stewart; The-Dream; Harrell^{[b]}	4:58
6.	"What's Your Name" (featuring will.i.am)	Raymond IV; Adams; Toby	will.i.am; Harrell^{[b]}	3:58
7.	"Prayer for You (Interlude)"			1:43
8.	"Something Special"	Raymond IV; Dupri; Phillips; Seal; Austin	Dupri; Seal^{[a]}; LRoc^{[a]}	3:58
9.	"Love You Gently"	Raymond IV; Harris; Davis; DeVaughn	Harris; Davis	3:39
10.	"Best Thing" (featuring Jay-Z)	Raymond IV; Dupri; Austin; Seal; Carter	Dupri; Seal^{[a]}	3:54
11.	"Before I Met You"	Raymond IV; Cox; Austin; Dean; Love	Cox; Dean^{[c]}; Love^{[c]}; Austin^{[b]}	4:56
12.	"His Mistakes"	Raymond IV; Smith, Jr.; Eriksen; Hermansen	StarGate; Ne-Yo^{[a]}	4:59
13.	"Appetite"	Raymond IV; Hills; Muhammad; Nelson; Lewis; Casey; Dupri; Seal; Araica	Danja	3:58
14.	"What's a Man to Do"	Raymond IV; Austin; Eriksen; Hermansen	StarGate	4:09
15.	"Revolver"	Raymond IV; Miguel Pimentel; Alexander "Prettiboifresh" Parhm, Jr.; Toby; Melvin Glover; Sylvia Robinson	Prettiboifresh	3:16
16.	"Lifetime"	Raymond IV; Lovett; Lackey	Lackey	4:36
17.	"Love in This Club Part II" (featuring Beyoncé and Lil Wayne)	Raymond IV; Hilson; Carter, Jr.; Jones; Taylor; Jenkins; Lovett; Thomas; Dalton; Bell; Creed	DJ Toomp, Darkchild	5:09
18.	"Here I Stand"	Raymond IV; Harris; Davis; Blackstone; Gaddis	Harris; Davis	4:10
19.	"Will Work for Love"	Raymond IV; Rotem; Fauntleroy II	J.R. Rotem	3:16

Amazon.com bonus track
No.	Title	Length
19.	"Love in This Club (Jason Nevins Extended Mix)" (featuring Young Jeezy)	6:46

iTunes Store deluxe version bonus tracks
No.	Title	Writer(s)	Producer(s)	Length
15.	"Revolver"	Raymond IV; Parhm, Jr.; Glover; Pimentel; Robinson; Toby	Prettyboifresh	3:16
16.	"Lifetime"	Raymond IV; Lovett; Lackey	Lackey	4:36
17.	"Love in This Club Part II" (featuring Beyoncé and Lil Wayne)	Raymond IV; Carter, Jr.; Hilson; Jones; Taylor; Jenkins; Dalton; Lovett; Taylor; Thomas; Bell; Creed	DJ Toomp, Darkchild	5:09
18.	"Here I Stand"	Raymond IV; Harris; Davis; Blackstone; Gaddis	Dre & Vidal	4:10
19.	"Will Work for Love"	Raymond IV; Rotem; Fauntleroy II	J.R. Rotem	3:16
20.	"Love in This Club (Remix)" (featuring T.I. and Young Jeezy)	Raymond IV; Clifford Harris, Jr.; Jenkins; Jones; Taylor; Lovett; Thomas; Dalton	Polow da Don	4:24
21.	"Love in This Club" (featuring Young Jeezy) (music video)			6:14

Notes

- "Love in This Club Part II" contains a portion of the composition "You Are Everything", written by Thomas Bell and Linda Creed.
- ^{^[a]} signifies a co-producer.
- ^{^[b]} signifies a vocal producer.
- ^{^[c]} signifies an additional producer.

== Personnel ==
Credits for Here I Stand adapted from Allmusic.

- The Ambassadors – keyboards
- Marcella "Ms. Lago" Araica – mixing
- Chris Athens – mastering
- Johntá Austin – vocal production
- Tim Blacksmith – management
- Adam Blackstone – music
- B.M.C. – bass, strings, drums, keyboards, programming, editing
- G. Preston Boebel – engineering
- Kobie Brown – music clearance
- Míguel Bustamante – mixing assistance
- Candice Childress – production coordination
- Brian Michael Cox – arrangement, production
- Danny D – management
- Vidal Davis – production, instrumentation
- Vincent Dilorenzo – engineering, mixing
- Dylan Dresdow – mixing
- Assa Drori – violin
- Jermaine Dupri – production, mixing
- Mattias Eng – music clearance
- Mikkel S. Eriksen – engineering, instrumentation, grand piano
- Donald Ferrone – double bass
- Brent Fischer – conductor, string arrangements
- Clare Fischer – string arrangements
- Armen Garabedian – principal
- Brian Gately – production coordination
- Serban Ghenea – mixing
- Mark Gray – engineering assistant
- Ryan Greene – engineering
- Donato Guadagnoli – music clearance
- John Hanes – digital editing
- Kuk Harrell – production, engineering, vocal production
- Andre Harris – production, instrumentation
- Vahe Hayrikyan – cello
- Karl Heilbron – guitar, engineering
- Tor Erik Hermansen – instrumentation
- Chris Hicks – author, management
- Leticia Hilliard – artist coordination
- Ray Holton – guitar
- John Horesco IV – engineering
- Josh Houghkirk – mixing assistance, assistance
- Dave Hyman – engineering
- Jay-Z – vocals
- Jazze Pha – production
- Padraic Kerin – engineering
- Beyoncé Knowles – vocals
- James Lackey – production
- Lyah Beth LeFlore – liner notes
- Lil Wayne – vocals
- Espen Lind – guitar
- Craig Love – guitar, production
- Manny Marroquin – mixing
- Derrick "Young World" McAlister – keyboards
- Carlos "Los Da Mystro" McKinney – production
- Benny Medina – author, management
- Tadd Mingo – engineering assistance
- Scott Naughton – engineering
- Ne-Yo – production
- Alec Newell – engineering
- Greg Ogan – engineering
- Carlos Oyanedel – mixing assistance
- Anthony Palazzole – mixing assistance
- Joe Peluso – engineering assistance, mixing assistance
- Dave Pensado – mixing
- Kazi Pitelka – viola
- Mark Pitts – executive production, author, A&R
- Christian Plata – mixing assistance
- Polow da Don – production, instrumentation
- Tameka Raymond – stylist
- Usher – vocals, executive production
- Geoff Rice – engineering assistance
- Tim Roberts – Pro-Tools
- J.R. Rotem – arrangement, production, instrumentation
- Norman Jean Roy – photography
- Brian Schunck – mixing assistance
- Manuel Seal – guitar, production
- Harry Shirinian – viola
- Cory Shoemaker – engineering assistance
- S.O.S. Horn Players – horn
- Soundz – production
- Brian Springer – engineering
- Brian Stanley – engineering, mixing
- Christopher "Tricky" Stewart – production
- Phil Tan – mixing
- Tony Terrebonne – engineering
- Sam Thomas – engineering
- Pat Thrall – engineering
- Andrew Weupper – mixing assistance
- will.i.am – synthesizer, production, engineering, Fender Rhodes, drum programming, vocals
- Corey Williams – engineering
- Andrew Wuepper – mixing assistance
- Young Jeezy – vocals

== Charts ==
=== Weekly charts ===
Chart (2008)	Peak position
Australian Albums (ARIA)	1
Australian Urban Albums (ARIA)	1
Austrian Albums (Ö3 Austria)	24
Belgian Albums (Ultratop Flanders)	3
Belgian Albums (Ultratop Wallonia)	8
Canadian Albums (Billboard)	1
Danish Albums (Hitlisten)	15
Dutch Albums (Album Top 100)	5
European Top 100 Albums (Billboard)	3
Finnish Albums (Suomen virallinen lista)	39
French Albums (SNEP)	7
German Albums (Offizielle Top 100)	10
Irish Albums (IRMA)	2
Italian Albums (FIMI)	38
Japanese Albums (Oricon)	4
New Zealand Albums (RMNZ)	5
Norwegian Albums (VG-lista)	16
Polish Albums (ZPAV)	36
Scottish Albums (Official Charts)	6
Swedish Albums (Sverigetopplistan)	18
Swiss Albums (Schweizer Hitparade)	4
Taiwanese Albums (Five Music)	1
UK Albums (Official Charts)	1
US Billboard 200	1
US Top R&B/Hip-Hop Albums (Billboard)	1

=== Year-end charts ===
Chart (2008)	Position
Australian Albums (ARIA)	62
Australian Urban Albums (ARIA)	10
Belgian Albums (Ultratop Flanders)	81
Dutch Albums (Album Top 100)	68
French Albums (SNEP)	194
Swiss Albums (Schweizer Hitparade)	83
UK Albums (OCC)	80
US Billboard 200	27
US Top R&B/Hip-Hop Albums (Billboard)	7

== Certifications and sales ==
Region	Certification	Certified units/sales
Australia (ARIA)	Gold	35,000^{^}
Ireland (IRMA)	Gold	7,500^{^}
Japan (RIAJ)	Gold	100,000^{^}
United Kingdom (BPI)	Gold	100,000^{*}
United States (RIAA)	2× Platinum	2,000,000^{‡}
^{*} Sales figures based on certification alone.^{^} Shipments figures based on certification alone.^{‡} Sales+streaming figures based on certification alone.

== Release history ==
Region	Date	Label
Austria	May 13, 2008	LaFace Records
Belgium	May 13, 2008	LaFace Records
Denmark	May 13, 2008	LaFace Records
Finland	May 13, 2008	LaFace Records
Ireland	May 13, 2008	LaFace Records
Italy	May 13, 2008	LaFace Records
Mexico	May 13, 2008	LaFace Records
Netherlands	May 13, 2008	LaFace Records
Norway	May 13, 2008	LaFace Records
Portugal	May 13, 2008	LaFace Records
Spain	May 13, 2008	LaFace Records
Sweden	May 13, 2008	LaFace Records
Australia	May 23, 2008	LaFace Records
France	May 23, 2008	LaFace Records
Germany	May 23, 2008	LaFace Records
Japan	May 23, 2008	LaFace Records
New Zealand	May 23, 2008	LaFace Records
United Kingdom	May 23, 2008	LaFace Records
Canada	May 27, 2008	LaFace Records
United States	May 27, 2008	LaFace Records

== See also ==
- List of number-one albums of 2008 (Australia)
- List of number-one albums of 2008 (Canada)
- List of UK Albums Chart number ones of the 2000s
- List of number-one albums of 2008 (U.S.)
- List of number-one R&B albums of 2008 (U.S.)
