= What's Your Name (Usher song) =

Single by Usher featuring will.i.am

from the album Here I Stand
- Released: August 18, 2008
- Recorded: Ethernet Studios (Los Angeles, California), Patchwerk Studios (Atlanta, Georgia), Triangle Sound Studios (Atlanta, Georgia)
- Length: 3:58
- Label: LaFace
- Songwriters: Usher; will.i.am; Ryan Toby
- Producer: will.i.am

Usher singles chronology
"Moving Mountains" (2008)	"What's Your Name" (2008)	"Here I Stand" (2008)

will.i.am singles chronology
"One More Chance" (2008)	"What's Your Name" (2008)	"All My Life (In the Ghetto)" (2008)

"What's Your Name" is a song by American recording artist Usher and features will.i.am. Written by Usher, will.i.am and Ryan Toby and produced by will.i.am, it was sent to radio on August 18, 2008, as the fourth single from Usher's fifth studio album, Here I Stand (2008), and was later released as a compact disc single and digital download. "What's Your Name" is a mid-tempo electro dance song, and is based on new wave-influenced synth riffs.

The song entered the Australian Singles Chart and the Canadian Hot 100; it peaked at numbers ninety-one and eighty-four, respectively. Usher and will.i.am performed the song at the 2008 National Football League Kickoff game concert, and it was also used in a Sony Ericsson contest.

== Background and release ==
"What's Your Name" was written by Usher, will.i.am and Ryan Toby, while it was produced by will.i.am and the vocals were produced by Kuk Harrell. The song was recorded by Jeremy Stevenson at Patchwerk Studios and Triangle Sound Studios in Atlanta, Georgia, and by will.i.am and Padraic Kerin at Ethernet Studios, Los Angeles, California. Dylan Dresdow mixed the record at PaperVu Studios, Los Angeles. Usher explained to MTV News that the "lighthearted" song was written for his "younger, up-and-coming fans".

"What's Your Name" was sent to US contemporary hit radio on August 18, 2008, and to US rhythmic contemporary radio on August 25. The song was released as a CD single and music download in Australia and New Zealand on September 13, 2008. it featured "What's Your Name" along with an instrumental version of the track. Usher and will.i.am performed the song at the warmup concert for the 2008 National Football League Kickoff game on September 4. Sony Ericsson used "What's Your Name" in a customer competition to meet Usher. Contestants entered by sending videos of themselves singing twenty to sixty seconds of Usher's parts of the song.

== Composition ==
"What's Your Name"
The song uses thrusting new wave-influenced synth riffs.

"What's Your Name" is a midtempo electro song, and bases its melody on thrusting new wave-influenced synths. It contains a "whimsical" beat that utilizes sirens and wind instruments. Greg Kot of the Chicago Tribune compared the song's synth riff to the music that was popular during the 1980s MTV generation, while John Soeder from The Plain Dealer noted its similarity to British duo the Eurythmics. Usher monotonously repeats the pick-up line hook, "What's your name?", and thereby pays homage to his bachelor history. The song's lyrics describe "the feeling you get when you run into a woman that makes you speak gibberish".

== Reception ==
Allmusic's Andy Kellman noted the song as a highlight of Here I Stand, and compared it to "Yeah!" (2004). Chad Grischow from IGN also chose the song as one of the album's best tracks, and called it appropriate for "a windows-down spring car ride". Digital Spy's Nick Levine called the song "rubbery" and danceable and compared it to Timbaland's work. The Washington Post's Serena Kim praised will.i.am's production and vocal appearance on "What's Your Name". Sara Berry called it "a sleek, edgy dance hit". In his mixed review of the song, Waleed Hafeez from The National wrote, "'What's Your Name', produced by will.i.am, provides listeners with another club track, albeit an average one". Dan Gennoe from Yahoo! Music called the song "disjointed and ultimately missable", noting that will.i.am may have lost his Midas touch. A writer for Stuff called "What's Your Name" the worst song from Here I Stand, describing it as "downright awful". "What's Your Name" entered the Canadian Hot 100 at number eighty-four on June 14, 2008, but fell off the chart the following week, and made no reappearance. "What's Your Name" debuted on the Australian Singles Chart at number ninety-one on September 22, 2008. The following week it moved to number one hundred, before slipping out of the chart. It peaked at number fifty-one on the Australian Physical Singles Chart and lasted nineteen weeks in the chart.

== Track listing ==
All tracks written by Usher, will.i.am, and Ryan Toby.

Digital single
No.	Title	Length
1.	"What's Your Name" (album version)	3:58
2.	"What's Your Name" (instrumental)	3:58

== Personnel ==
Credits lifted from the liner notes of Here I Stand.

- Chris Athens – mastering
- Dylan Dresdow – mixing
- Kuk Harrell – vocal production
- Padraic Kerin – recording
- Joe Peluso – assistant mixing
- Jeremy Stevenson – recording
- Ryan Toby – writing
- will.i.am – writing, production, recording, drum programming, synths, Rhodes
- Usher – writing

== Charts ==
Weekly chart performance for "What's Your Name"
Chart (2008)	Peak position
Australia (ARIA)	91
Canada Hot 100 (Billboard)	84
