= Contemporary R&B =

Rhythm and blues music genre

- Stylistic origins: Rhythm and blues; pop; disco; funk; soul; jazz; blues; electronic; hip-hop
- Cultural origins: Late 1970s and early 1980s, North America
- Typical instruments: guitar; bass guitar; keyboards; synthesizers; electric guitar; drums; sampler; flute; saxophone; trumpet; trombone; violin; viola; cello; Akai MPC; Roland TR-808; Hammond B3; organ; Fender Rhodes; synth bass
- Derivative forms: Neo soul; nu-funk; 2-step; alternative R&B; afroswing

Subgenres
- Hip-hop soul; RnBass

Fusion genres
- Crunk&B; Latin R&B; new jack swing; pluggnb; raï'n'B; rhythm & grime; snap&B

Contemporary R&B is a popular music genre, originating from African-American musicians in the 1970s that combines rhythm and blues with elements of pop, disco, funk, soul, jazz, blues, electronic and hip-hop. The incorporation of disco and electronic textures and production styles, which has come to prominence since the 2010s, brought forth a style called electro-R&B.

The genre features a distinctive record production style and a smooth, lush style of vocal arrangement. Electronic influences and the use of hip-hop or dance-inspired beats are typical, although the roughness and grit inherent in hip-hop may be reduced and smoothed out. Contemporary R&B vocalists often use melisma, and since the mid-1980s, R&B rhythms have been combined with elements of hip-hop culture and music, soul culture and soul music.

== Precursors ==
According to Geoffrey Himes speaking in 1989, the progressive soul movement of the early 1970s "expanded the musical and lyrical boundaries of [R&B] in ways that haven't been equaled since". This movement was led by soul singers, songwriters and producers such as Curtis Mayfield, Marvin Gaye, and Stevie Wonder. Norman Whitfield's productions at Motown, the record label of Gaye, were also pioneering for setting the soul vocals and simple hooks of earlier rhythm and blues records against strong backbeats, vocal harmonies, and orchestral sounds, all of which thickened the texture of the music. Gaye's own music on albums such as What's Going On (1971) incorporated jazz influences that led the genre into a looser musical direction.

The nearest precursor to contemporary R&B came at the end of the disco era in the late 1970s, when Michael Jackson and Quincy Jones added more electronic elements to the sound of the time, creating a smoother dancefloor-friendly style. The first result was Off the Wall (1979), which—according to Stephen Thomas Erlewine from AllMusic—"was a visionary album, that found a way to break disco wide open into a new world where the beat was undeniable, but not the primary focus" and "was part of a colorful tapestry of lush ballads and strings, smooth soul and pop, soft rock, and alluring funk".

Richard J. Ripani wrote that Janet Jackson's Control (1986) was "important to the development of R&B for several reasons", as she and her producers, Jimmy Jam and Terry Lewis, "crafted a new sound that fuses the rhythmic elements of funk and disco, along with heavy doses of synthesizers, percussion, sound effects, and a rap music sensibility." Ripani wrote that "the success of "Control" led to the incorporation of stylistic traits of rap over the next few years, and Janet Jackson was to continue to be one of the leaders in that development." That same year, Teddy Riley began producing R&B recordings that included hip hop influences. This combination of R&B style and hip hop rhythms was termed "new jack swing" and was applied to artists such as Keith Sweat, Bobby Brown, Johnny Kemp, and Bell Biv DeVoe.

== 1990s ==
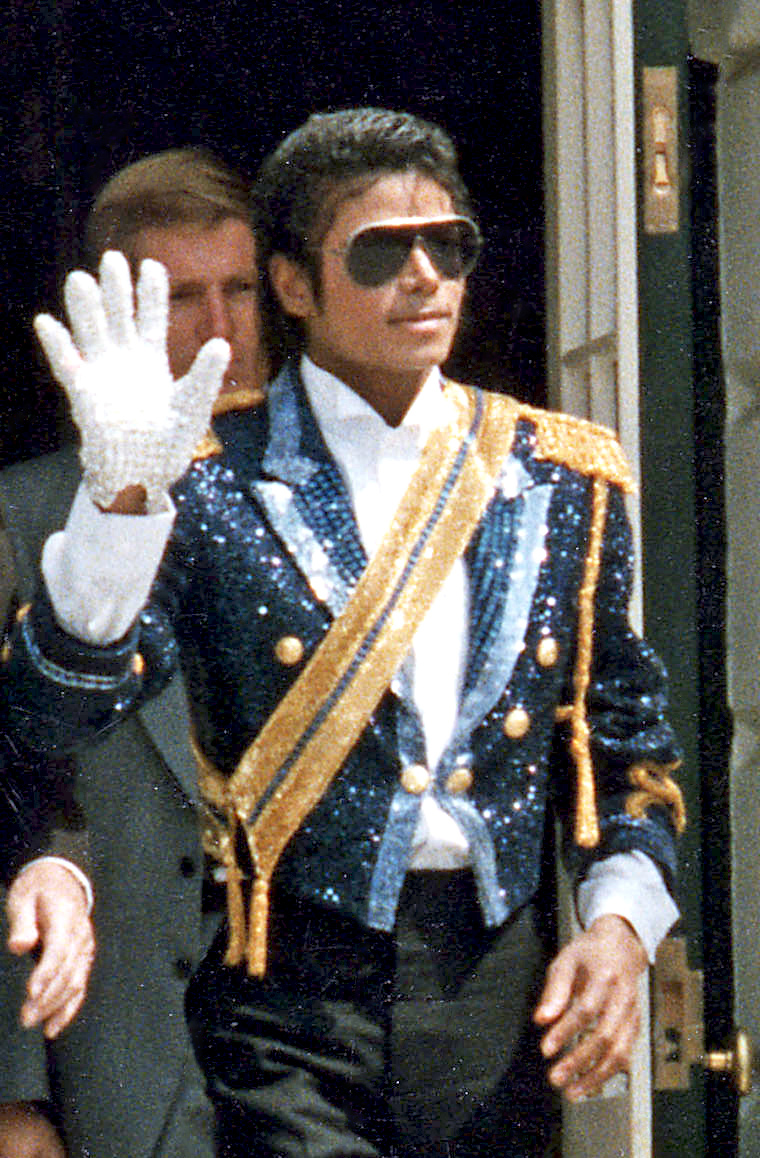
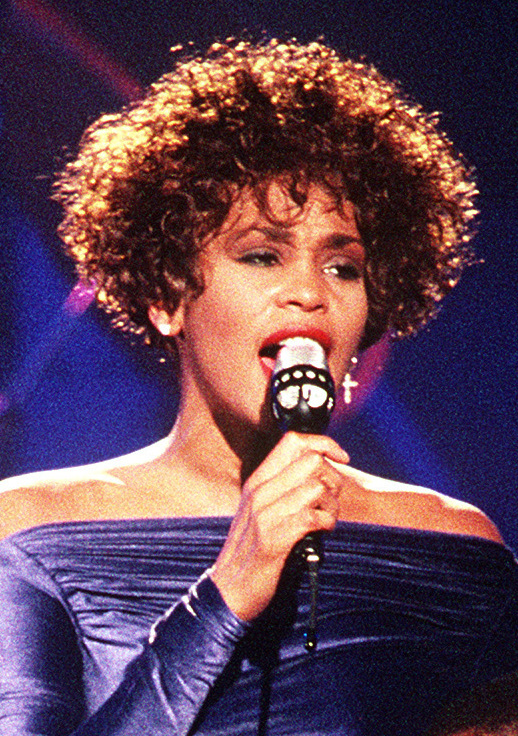
The Recording Industry Association of America (RIAA) certified Michael Jackson and Whitney Houston as the two best-selling R&B artists of the 20th century.

Whitney Houston's The Bodyguard: Original Soundtrack Album (1992) eventually sold over 45 million copies worldwide becoming the best-selling soundtrack of all time. Janet Jackson's self-titled fifth studio album Janet (1993), which came after her multimillion-dollar contract with Virgin Records, sold over 14 million copies worldwide. Boyz II Men and Mariah Carey recorded several Billboard Hot 100 No. 1 hits, including "One Sweet Day", a collaboration between both acts, which became the longest-running No. 1 hit in Hot 100 history. Carey also released a remix of her 1995 single "Fantasy", with Ol' Dirty Bastard as a feature, a collaboration format that was unheard of at this point. Carey, Boyz II Men and TLC released albums in 1994 and 1995—Daydream, II, & CrazySexyCool.

In the late 1990s, neo soul, which added 1970s soul influences to the hip-hop soul blend, arose, led by artists such as Erykah Badu, Lauryn Hill and Maxwell. Hill and Missy Elliott further blurred the line between R&B and hip-hop by recording both styles. Beginning in 1995, the Grammy Awards enacted the Grammy Award for Best R&B Album, with II by Boyz II Men becoming the first recipient. The award was later received by TLC for CrazySexyCool in 1996, Tony Rich for Words in 1997, Erykah Badu for Baduizm in 1998 and Lauryn Hill for The Miseducation of Lauryn Hill in 1999. In 1994, Aaliyah released her debut album and in 1996 she released her second album called "One In A Million" with different sounds and produced by Missy Elliott and Timbaland, unknown at that moment. At the end of 1999, Billboard magazine ranked Mariah Carey and Janet Jackson as the first and second most successful artists of the 1990s.

Simultaneously, in the second half of the 1990s, The Neptunes and Timbaland set influential precedence on contemporary R&B and hip-hop music.

== 2000s ==
Writing in 2003, music critic Robert Christgau describes modern R&B as being "about texture, mood, feel—vocal and instrumental and rhythmic, articulated as they're smooshed together".

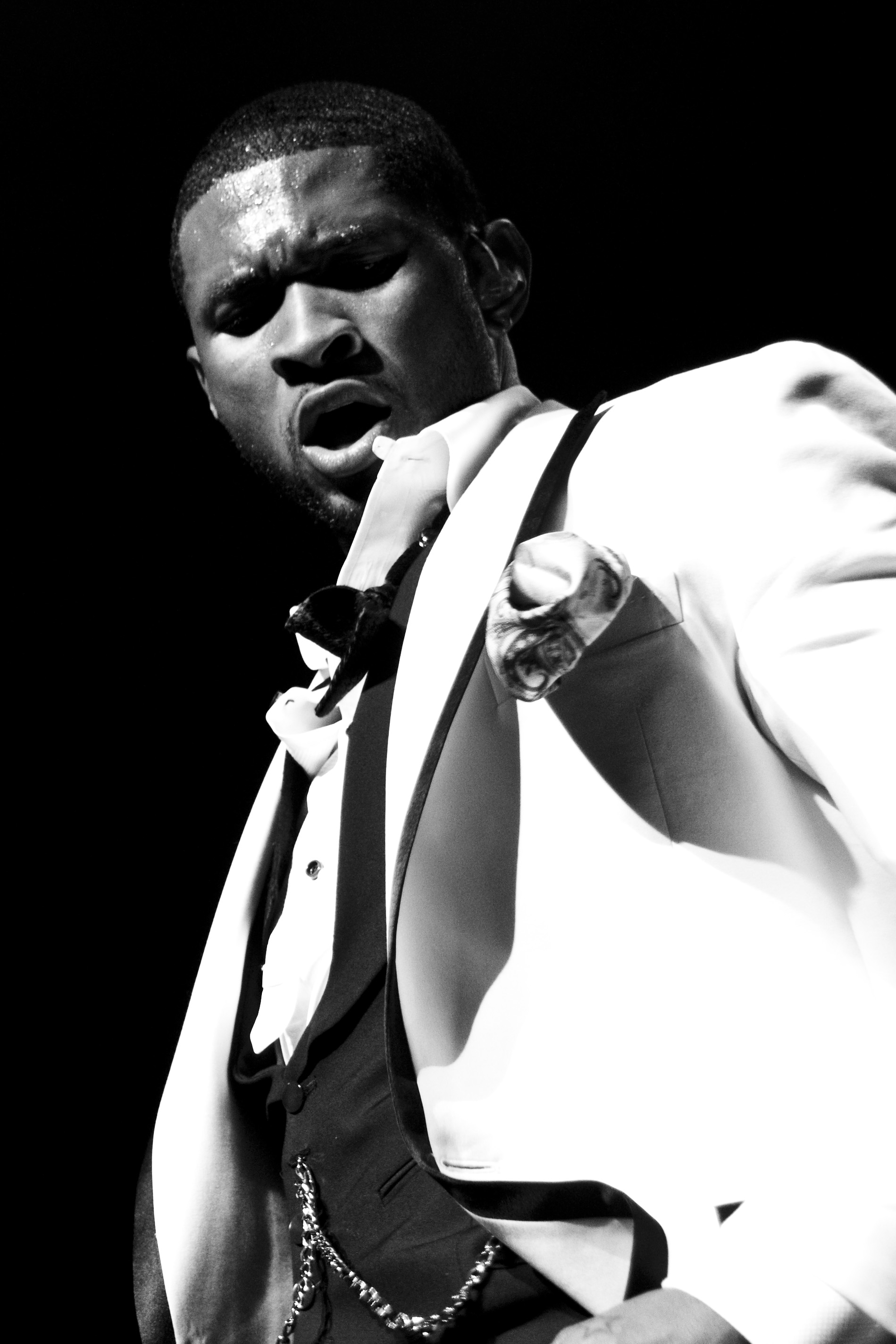
Usher was cited by Billboard as the no. 1 Hot 100 artist of the 2000s decade, with 7 number-one singles that accumulated 42 weeks at the top.

Following periods of fluctuating success, urban music attained commercial dominance during the early 2000s, which featured massive crossover success on the Billboard charts by R&B and hip hop artists.

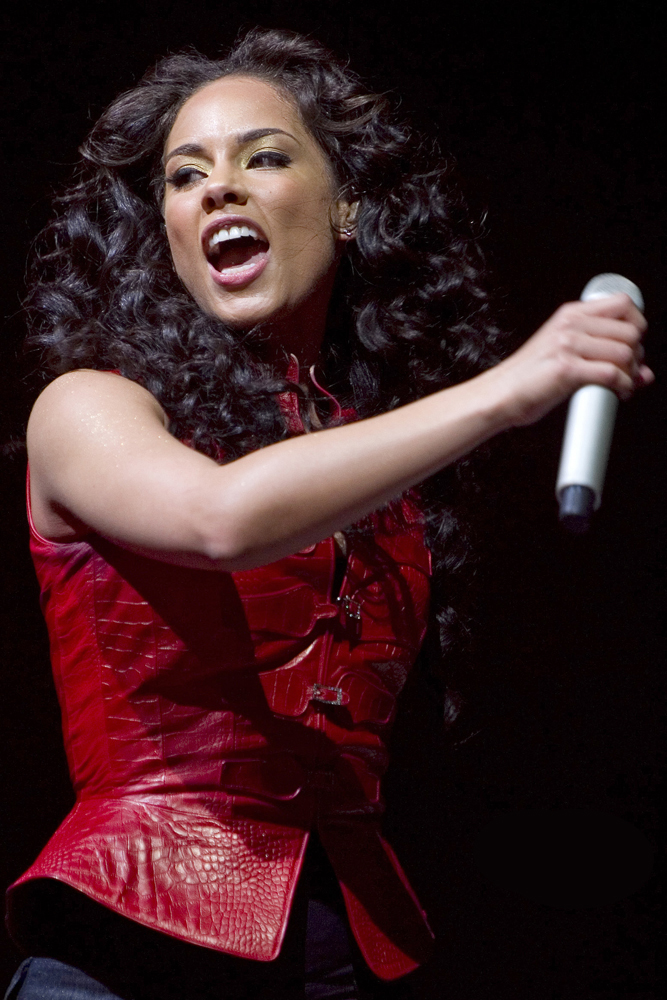
Alicia Keys ranked fifth on Billboard Artist of the Decade list. "No One" ranks No. 6 on the Billboard Hot 100 songs of the decade.

In 2001, Alicia Keys released "Fallin'" as her debut single, peaking at number one on the Billboard Hot 100, Mainstream Top 40 and Hot R&B/Hip-Hop Songs charts. It won three Grammy Awards in 2002, including Song of the Year, Best R&B Song, and Best Female R&B Vocal Performance. It was also nominated for Record of the Year. Beyoncé's solo studio debut album Dangerously in Love (2003) has sold over 5 million copies in the United States and earned five Grammy Awards.

Usher's Confessions (2004) sold 1.1 million copies in its first week and over 8 million copies in 2004, since then it has been certified Diamond by the Recording Industry Association of America (RIAA) and, As of 2016, has sold over 10 million copies in the US and over 20 million copies worldwide. Confessions had four consecutive Billboard Hot 100 number one singles—"Yeah!", "Burn", "Confessions Part II" and "My Boo". It won three Grammy Awards in 2005, including Best Contemporary R&B Album, Best R&B Performance by a Duo or Group with Vocal for "My Boo" and Best Rap/Sung Collaboration for "Yeah!"

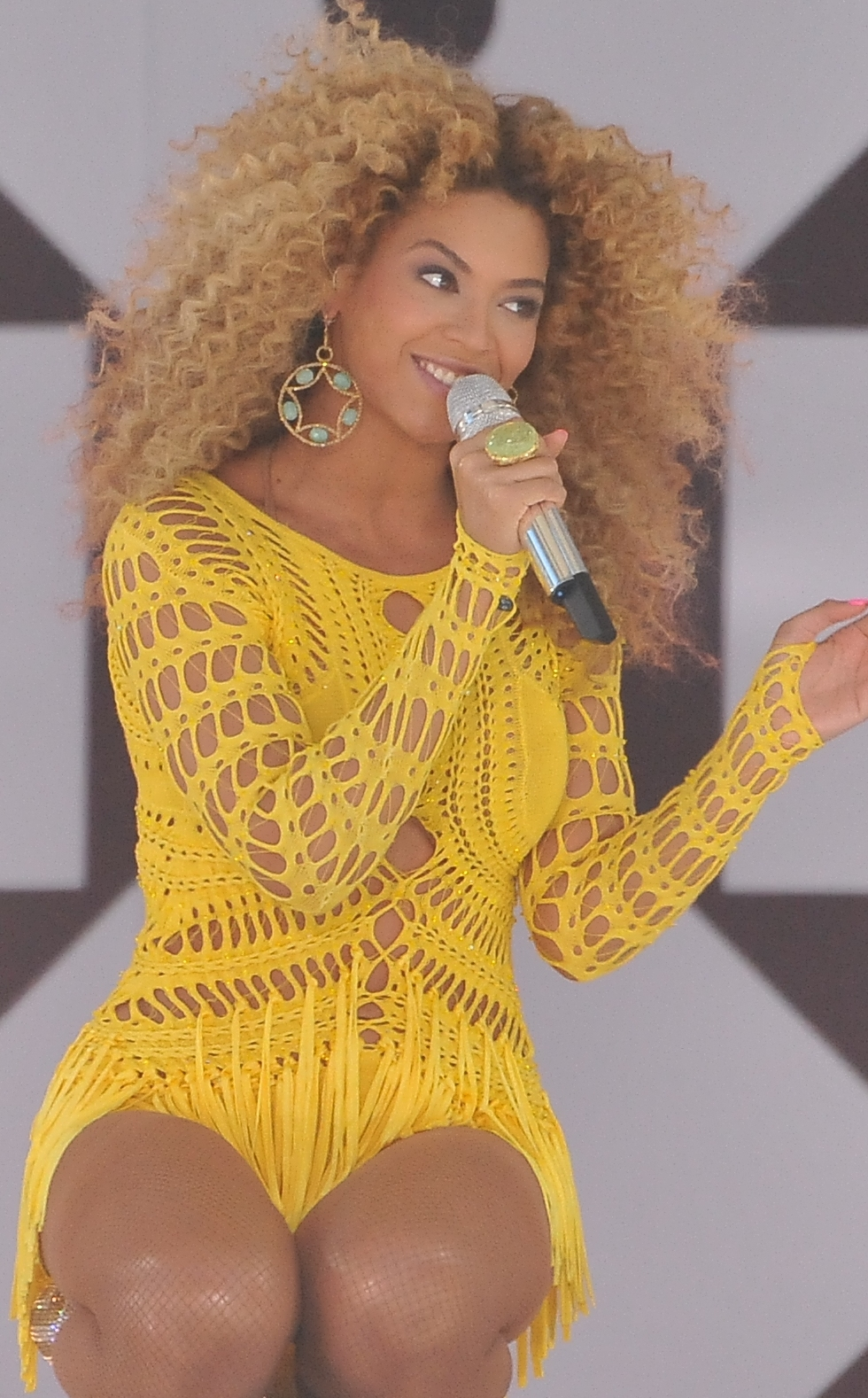
Beyoncé was named by Billboard the most successful female act of the 2000s.

In 2004, all 12 songs that topped the Billboard Hot 100 were African-American recording artists and accounted for 80% of the number-one R&B hits that year. Along with Usher's streak of singles, Top 40 radio and both pop and R&B charts were topped by Outkast's "Hey Ya!", Snoop Dogg's "Drop It Like It's Hot", Terror Squad's "Lean Back" and Ciara's "Goodies". Chris Molanphy of "The Village Voice" later remarked that "by the early 2000s, urban music "was" pop music."

Between 2005 and 2009 Raymond, Knowles and Keys released albums—B'Day, Here I Stand, I Am... Sasha Fierce and The Element of Freedom.

Mariah Carey's The Emancipation of Mimi (2005) debuted at number one on the Billboard 200 and earned ten Grammy Award nominations. The second single "We Belong Together" topped the Hot 100 charts for 14 weeks, and was later hailed "song of the decade" and won a Grammy Award for Best Female R&B Vocal Performance in 2006.

The mid-2000s came with the emergence of new R&B acts Ashanti, Keyshia Cole and Akon. Ashanti's eponymous debut album topped both US Billboard 200 and Top R&B/Hip-Hop Albums charts. It earned her three Grammy nominations winning one for the Best Contemporary R&B Album. R&B newcomer Chris Brown released his self-titled album in 2005 which debuted at number two on the "Billboard" 200. His debut single "Run It!" peaked atop on the Billboard Hot 100, Hot R&B/Hip-Hop Songs and the US Radio Songs.

During this time also came the emergence of R&B songwriters. Bryan-Michael Cox co-wrote Usher's "Burn" and "Confessions Part II"(2005), Mariah Carey's "Shake It Off" and "Don't Forget About Us" (2006), and Chris Brown's "Say Goodbye"(2006). Keri Hilson would co-write songs Mary J. Blige's "Take Me as I Am" (2006), Omarion's "Ice Box" (2006), and Ciara's "Like a Boy"(2006). Rico Love co-wrote Usher's "Throwback" (2005), Keri Hilson's "Energy"(2008), Pleasure P's "Boyfriend#2"(2008). The-Dream wrote Rihanna's "Umbrella"(2007), J. Holiday's "Bed" and Usher's "Moving Mountains" and "Trading Places"(2008). Ne-Yo wrote Mario's "Let Me Love You", Rihanna's "Take a Bow" and "Unfaithful", Beyoncé's "Irreplaceable"(2006) and "Me & U"(2006) by Cassie.

According to Billboard, the most commercially successful R&B acts of the decade were Usher, Alicia Keys, Beyoncé, Mariah Carey, Rihanna, Chris Brown, Ne-Yo and Akon.

== 2010s ==
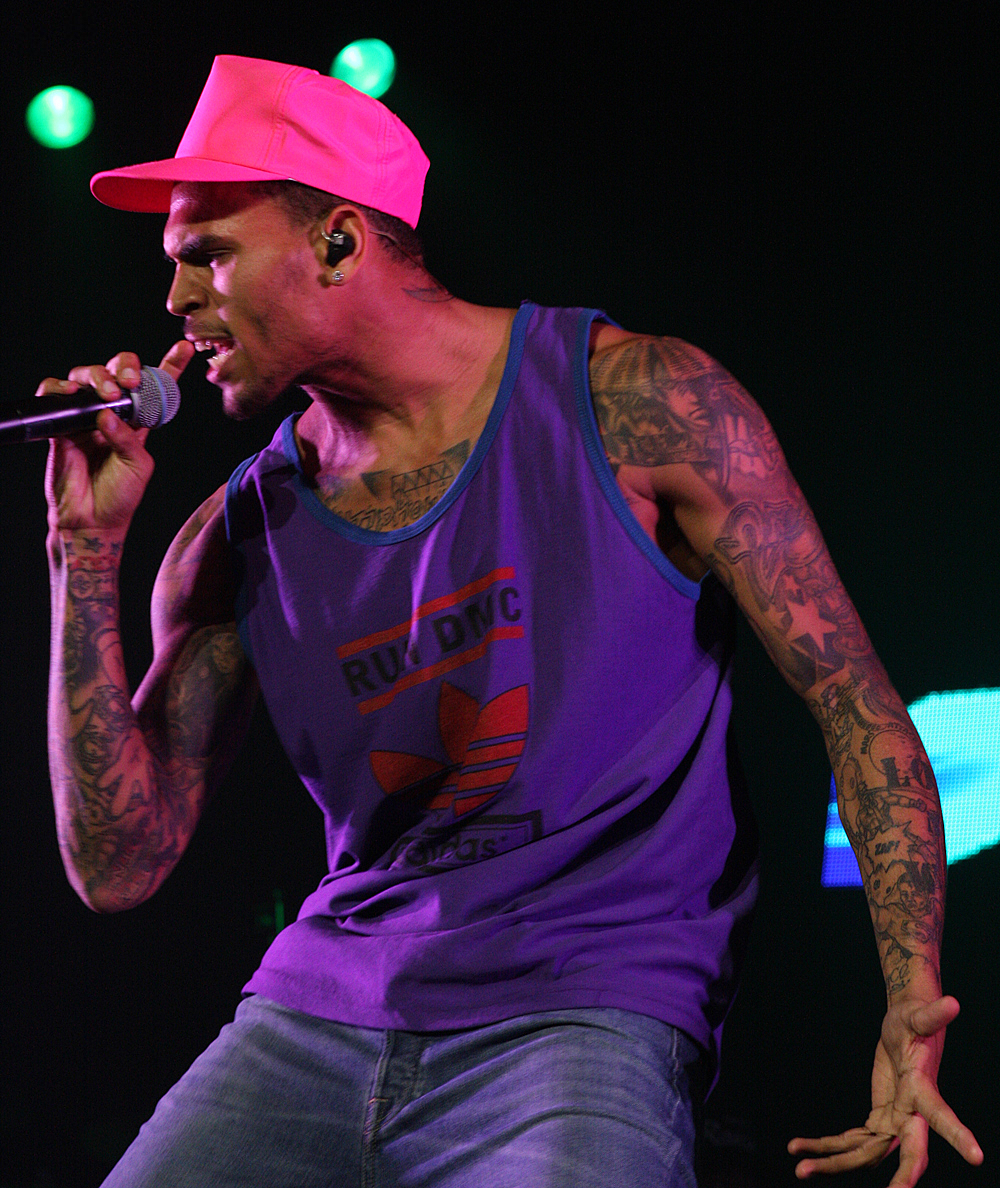
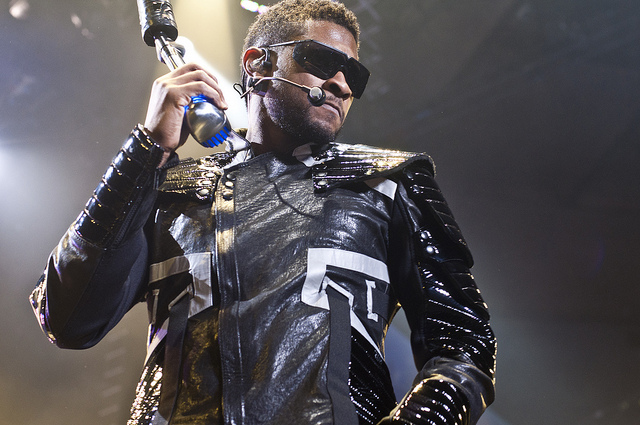
Contemporary R&B artists Chris Brown and Usher have experimented with EDM.

Continuing from the 1990s and 2000s, R&B, like many other genres, drew influences from the technical innovations of the time and began to incorporate more electronic and machine-made sounds and instruments, this evolving style called electro-R&B slowly began dominating the genre. Historically, the electro-R&B sound had been associated with R&B songs with an electronic backbone by 1990s or 2000s girl groups like TLC or Destiny's Child. The use of effects such as Auto-Tune and new computerized synths have given R&B a more futuristic feel while still attempting to incorporate many of the genre's common themes such as love, relationships, heartbreak, and loss. As defined by Apple Music, electro-R&B is "at the intersection of R&B and electronic music, creating abstract hip-hop that blends the moodier end of electro with minimal R&B beats".

According to Christgau in 2017, "almost all R&B goes for voice-plus-sound rather than voice-plus-song, with the sound ranging from precision track-and-hook to idiosyncratic atmospherics."

Early 2010s artists Usher and Chris Brown began embracing new electronic influences while still keeping R&B's original feel. Usher's "OMG" and "DJ Got Us Fallin' in Love", and Chris Brown's "Yeah 3x" are all EDM-oriented.

Singers Miguel, John Legend and Jeremih are popular in mainstream hip hop for many collaborations with rappers such as Wale, Rick Ross and J. Cole. Today's R&B is far more diverse and incorporates more sonic elements than before, as it expands its appeal and commercial viability. Trap music's influence maintained a strong presence on the music charts with R&B singer Beyoncé's songs "Drunk in Love", "Flawless" and "7/11", Bryson Tiller's debut studio album, Trapsoul and Mary J. Blige's "Thick of It".

Latin R&B gained ground as artists began mixing trap with the genre during the middle of the decade. Spanish-language singles by Alex Rose, Rauw Alejandro and Paloma Mami, incorporate elements of R&B and have reached a global audience. In Latin America, the genre became popular with Alex Rose's "Toda", and Sech's "Otro Trago".

== See also ==
- List of R&B musicians
