= Mark B. Christensen =

American audio engineer

Mark Christensen
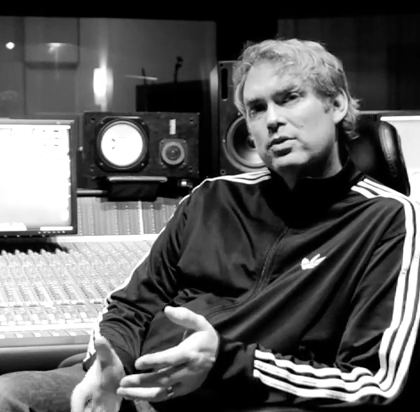

Background information
- Also known as: Mark Christensen
- Origin: United States
- Genres: Hip hop; alternative rock; pop; R&B
- Occupations: Record producer; audio engineer; songwriter
- Instruments: Guitar, bass, vocals
- Years active: 1990s–present uyo
- Label: Engine Room Recordings
- Website: Profile at Engine Room Audio; New York Audio Institute

Mark Christensen is an American audio engineer, known for mastering, producing, and mixing music in the genres of rock, pop, R&B, classical, and hip hop. He has been credited on two Grammy Award-winning albums, as well as seven albums nominated for the award. Christensen is a voting member of The Recording Academy and has served on the Producers and Engineers Committee of the New York Chapter.

Christensen has also mastered over thirty Billboard chart top ten hits, and has contributed to 50 projects that have received platinum or gold certifications by the RIAA. He has mastered material by Raekwon, Skilla Baby, Eminem, Big L, Mobb Deep, Joey Bada$$, Anderson Paak, Pop Smoke, OK GO, The Killers, Ice Spice, SZA, 98 Degrees, Boyz II Men, Fergie, Toni Braxton, Talib Kweli, Trey Songz, 50 Cent, Ryan Leslie and The Ting Tings, among others. In addition to his mastering work, Christensen expanded into Dolby Atmos mixing with the launch of the Blue Dolby Atmos Room at his New York City studio, Engine Room Audio, where he has mixed projects for artists including Skilla Baby, Ice Spice, Johnny Gill, Mobb Deep, and untiljapan.

Along with business partner Scott Lee, Christensen opened the New York Audio Institute, an audio engineering school hosted at Engine Room Audio to teach and mentor students on how to record, mix, master and produce records. Along with Scott Lee and Charles Farrar, he is one of the principals of Bond Street Artist Management.

== Career ==
=== Early touring and production (1980s–1990s) ===
Mark B. Christensen was born in Germany, and raised in the United States and England. By the age of sixteen he was touring with his own progressive rock material in the midwest. He began producing music at age nineteen, while also studying audio engineering and mastering techniques. He spent three years living in London in the early 1990s, producing independent albums and touring with bands such as The Waterboys and The Clash.

After returning to New York City Christensen began working at Soundtrack City as a line producer, and in 1995 he began playing with a number of New York bands. While at Soundtrack City, he signed another record deal based on a self-produced demo, and ended up working on tours for bands such as Radiohead, The Wallflowers and The Gin Blossoms. By the late 1990s he had played as a lead vocalist, guitarist, or songwriter for several bands in Colorado, London, and New York. Also in the 1990s he did session work as a singer, guitarist, and songwriter, singing backup on several projects by Kevin Salem of Roadrunner Records and co-writing material with Ivan Neville. Through Soundtrack City he also worked on the soundtracks for several commercials and films, including music videos for artists such as The Rolling Stones, Cyndi Lauper, Duran Duran, LL Cool J, and 3rd Bass. In 1995 he took a partial hiatus from music. During this time he opened and operated a restaurant in Manhattan, returning to music once the restaurant was financially stable.

=== Founding Engine Room Audio (1996–2003) ===
In 1996 Christensen founded Engine Room Audio (ERA) in lower Manhattan, originally constructing the studio in his loft apartment to master and record local bands. He is studio owner and chief engineer, and in 2000 he designed the cover for an album by Sin Dizzy. In 2001 he engineered several choral albums through Engine Room Audio, and the following year he remastered the bonus tracks for Linda Perhacs' Parallelograms. As of 2002 Engine Room Audio has offered traditional mastering and duplication services, as well as engineering, mastering, recording, and in some cases production. Clients at the studio have since included Lady Gaga, The Killers, and The Ting Tings, Kylie Minogue, A$AP Rocky, and Toni Braxton, among others. Other mastering projects at ERA include an album by Tony Jarvis, a number of classical albums for Museovitch Productions, and several projects for Respect Music, an alternative dance label in Hong Kong.

=== Founding Engine Room Recordings (2004–08) ===
The independent record label Engine Room Recordings was started by Christensen and Peter Block in 2005. In 2006 the label released its first record, Twisted Heart by Goat, with Christensen mastering. The New York City-based band Porter Block soon joined the roster, with Christensen again mastering their debut album. Engine Room is also well known for producing the compilation series Guilt by Association. Guilt by Association Vol. 1 (2007), Guilt by Association Vol. 2 (2008) and Guilt by Association Vol. 3 (2011) feature various independent artists covering well-known pop, R&B and rock songs from the 1980s, 1990s, and 2000s, with Christensen mastering. The label released a compilation of Weezer covers in 2012.

In 2008 Engine Room Recordings signed Brooklyn-based bands Lowry and The Bloodsugars. Christensen helped produce as well as master Lowry's debut album. 2009 saw the label sign U.S. Royalty, among other bands. While Christensen worked on many of Engine Room's releases at that time, he also continued to master material for artists on other labels such as Babygrande. He has mastered a large number of singles and albums for Trey Songz on Atlantic Records since 2008, with Christensen explaining that "I master a lot of different styles of music, but his records are especially fun to work on" because of the production values. Also in 2008 Christensen continued to play guitar as a session musician for labels such as Universal Australia. In 2009 he mastered albums such as War Angel and Before I Self Destruct by 50 Cent.

=== Recent projects (2010–present) ===
In early 2012 Christensen mastered the first single off Trey Songz' album Chapter V, titled "Heart Attack," which was produced by Benny Blanco and Rico Love. Around that time he mastered a track for Pauly D on G-Note Records as well, and he worked with the Italian rap group Club Dogo in June 2012. Signed to Universal Music Group, the group's members DJ Don Joe and engineer Andrea "db" Debernardi flew to New York to mix and master an album with Christensen. Their resulting single "Cattivi Esempi" reached No. 2 on the Italian music charts. Christensen's other mastering projects in 2012 included the alt-rock band Weep's album Alate and the Trey Songz album Chapter V, which reached No. 1 on the Billboard 200 chart. Also that September, 50 Cent was in the studio with Christensen to master his single "New Day," which features Dr. Dre and Alicia Keys. The song was mixed by Eminem before mastering.

In 2013 Mark started working with the artist "Mr Probz", initially on his album "The Treatment" and the single "Waves" and new material including the single "Nothing Really Matters". On 27 April 2014, Waves debuted at number one on the UK Singles Chart after selling 127,000 copies in its first week. As of October 2014, it was the fourth-biggest selling single of 2014 in the UK, with sales of 758,000. The song also peaked at number one in Australia (currently 3× platinum), Austria (currently gold), Germany (currently 5× platinum), Italy (currently 3× platinum), Sweden (currently 5× platinum) and Switzerland (currently platinum). In the United States, the remix reached number one on the Billboard Dance/Mix Show Airplay chart for the issue dated 16 August 2014 and is currently Platinum.

Engine Room Audio in 2014 continued to work on projects by both 50 Cent and Trey Songz, with Christensen mastering albums such as 50 Cent's Animal Ambition. Other recent mastering projects include Collide by Boyz II Men and Game Changer by Johnny Gill. Christensen's associated projects had been nominated for five Grammy Awards as of 2015, winning two of them. At that point Christensen had also worked on over 24 Billboard chart top ten hits, and around 25 of the releases had gone platinum or gold. Christensen is an official "mentor" at Recording Connection, a New York-based school for music recording. He also periodically chairs and moderates audio engineering panels at music industry events.

From 2017 to the present, Christensen has continued to work with a wide range of prominent artists. He mastered SZA’s Ctrl album, which was also recorded at his New York City studio, Engine Room Audio, and has since mastered projects for Flipp Dinero, Conway the Machine, Skilla Baby, Eminem, and Chaka Khan. In June 2023, he expanded his studio with the opening of the Blue Room, a Dolby Atmos mixing suite, where he has mixed immersive audio projects for artists including Skilla Baby, Ice Spice, Johnny Gill, Mobb Deep,and untiljapan.

== Discography ==
=== Production credits ===
Selected production credits for Mark B. Christensen
| Yr | Artist(s) | Release title | Role |
|---|---|---|---|
| 1996 | Kevin Salem | Glimmer | Vocals (background) |
| 2000 | Voyces | Best Day of My Life | Mastering |
| 2000 | Sin Dizzy | He's Not Dead | Photography, Cover Design |
| 2001 | Choir of the Church of St. Agnes | Treasure of Inestimable Value | Engineer |
| 2001 | Various Artists | A Treasure of Inestimable Value: Music From The Latin Mass At Saint Agnes, New York | Engineer |
| 2003 | Linda Perhacs | Parallelograms [Bonus Tracks] | Remastering |
| 2003 | Kenny Davidsen | Goodnight, Baby | Mastering |
| 2004 | Big Brothers and Big Sisters of New York City | The Centennial CD | Mastering |
| 2004 | The Colorbars | Making Playthings | Mastering |
| 2004 | The Kin | Tracing | Mastering |
| 2004 | Urban Survival | Story Hill | Mastering |
| 2005 | Langhorne Slim | When it Goes Down | Mastering |
| 2005 | Jamie Rae | September Skies | Mastering, engineering, bass guitar |
| 2005 | Hotspur | EP | Mastering |
| 2005 | Charlelie Couture | 12 Chansons Dams La Sciure | Mastering |
| 2005 | Grace Garland | Lovers Never Lie (In Bed) | Mastering |
| 2006 | Swift Ships | Rebel Renaissance | Mastering |
| 2006 | Goat | Twisted Heart | Mastering |
| 2006 | Dufus | The Last Classed Blast | Mastering |
| 2006 | David LK Murphy | Goodbye | Engineer |
| 2007 | Various Artists | Guilt by Association Vol. 1 | Mastering |
| 2007 | The Doughboys | Now and Then | Mastering |
| 2007 | Sullee | It's Time | Mastering |
| 2007 | Schwervon! | I Dream of Teeth | Mastering |
| 2007 | R.I.C | Visionary | Mastering |
| 2007 | Porter Block | Suburban Sprawl 2007 | Mastering |
| 2007 | Andrew Fortier | Restoration | Mastering |
| 2007 | Ben Godwin | Skin and Bone | Mastering, engineering |
| 2007 | Buck Pryor | Roo | Mastering |
| 2007 | Cheese on Bread | Search for Colonel Mustard | Mastering |
| 2007 | Fireball | Sounds Of Freedom (My Ultimate Summer Of Love Mix) | Mastering, promotions |
| 2007 | Hi-Tek | Hi-Teknology 3 Underground | Mastering |
| 2007 | Icewater | Polluted Water | Mastering |
| 2007 | Jake Stigers and the Velvet Roots | Do You Feel High? | Mastering |
| 2007 | Jeffery Lewis | 12 Crass Songs | Mastering |
| 2007 | Linda Draper | Keepsake | Mastering |
| 2007 | MIKA | "Relax (Take it Easy)" remix by Hex Hector | Mastering |
| 2007 | MIKA | Life in Cartoon Motion | Mastering |
| 2007 | Just.Live | Moxy | Mastering |
| 2007 | N.O.R.E. | Noreality | Mastering |
| 2007 | N.O.R.E. | N.O.R.E. | Mastering |
| 2007 | NYOIL | Hood Treason | Mastering |
| 2008 | Blue Sky Black Death | Holocaust Instrumentals | Mastering |
| 2008 | Andrew Suvalsky | A World That Swings | Mastering |
| 2008 | Lowry | Love is Dead | Mastering |
| 2008 | Langhorne Slim | Langhorne Slim | Mastering |
| 2008 | King Size | Love, Lust and other Disasters | Mastering |
| 2008 | King Arthur | Ride Wit' Me | Mastering |
| 2008 | Kevin Bents | The Means | Mastering |
| 2008 | Kaz James | If They Knew | Mastering |
| 2008 | John Raymond Pollard | Character | Mastering |
| 2008 | Jedi Mind Tricks | A History of Violence | Mastering |
| 2008 | Immortal Technique and DJ Green Lantern | The 3rd World | Mastering |
| 2008 | Hell Rell | Black Mask Black Gloves | Mastering |
| 2008 | Hell Razah | Ultra Sounds of a Renaissance Child | Mastering |
| 2008 | Gutta | Heads Will Roll | Mastering |
| 2008 | Gregor Samsa | Rest | Mastering |
| 2008 | Great Caesar's | Means to an Ends | Mastering |
| 2008 | Glenton Davis | Soul Pop Rocks | Mastering |
| 2008 | Evelyn King | The Dance | Mastering |
| 2008 | Diamond D | Huge Hefner Chronicles | Mastering |
| 2008 | Deep Step | Promise You | Mastering |
| 2008 | DeClan | Thank You/You and Me | Mastering |
| 2008 | D-Block | Prepare for Glory | Mastering |
| 2008 | Dame Grease | Goon Musik | Mastering |
| 2008 | Candice Alley | "Falling (The Attic Vocal Mix)" | Mastering |
| 2008 | Bronze Narareth | Thought For Food, Vol 1&2 | Mastering |
| 2008 | Brett Williams | Rain | Mastering |
| 2008 | Blue Sky Black Death | Slow Burning Lights | Mastering |
| 2008 | Blue Sky Black Death | Late Night Cinema | Mastering |
| 2008 | Blue Sky Black Death | The Evil Jeanius | Mastering |
| 2008 | Wu Tang | Soundtracks from the Shaolin Temple | Mastering |
| 2008 | Victor Chambers | 12 Chambers of Worship | Mastering |
| 2008 | Various Artists | Guilt by Association Vol. 2 | Mastering |
| 2008 | Urban Sun | Practice Me | Mastering |
| 2008 | Tina Sugandh | "Break Me" | Mastering |
| 2008 | T.H.U.G Angels/Hell Razah | Welcome to Red Hook Houses | Mastering |
| 2008 | The Ting Tings | We Started Nothing | Mastering |
| 2008 | The Museum | Reverse this Dying Trend | Mastering |
| 2008 | The Murrills | Family Prayer | Mastering |
| 2008 | The Killers | Day & Age | Mastering |
| 2008 | The Bloodsugars | BQEP | Mastering |
| 2008 | Sia | Day Too Soon remixed by Soul Seekerz | Mastering |
| 2008 | Reg Mundey | Got To Know U | Mastering |
| 2008 | Ras Kass | Institutionalized, Vol. 2 | Mastering |
| 2008 | Ransom | Street Cinema | Mastering |
| 2008 | Rack-Lo | Rack Lauren | Mastering |
| 2008 | Porter Block | Off Our Shoulders | Mastering |
| 2008 | Pop it off Boys | Do The Batman | Mastering |
| 2008 | OuterSpace | God's Fury | Mastering |
| 2008 | Low Water | Twisting the Neck of the Swan | Mastering |
| 2008 | John Pollard | Dreams | Mastering |
| 2008 | Andrew Fortier | The Upsidedown Sky | Mastering |
| 2008 | Amazon Dart | Freakatorium | Mastering |
| 2008 | 9th Prince | "Prince of New York" | Mastering |
| 2009 | Kyle Jones | Alive | Mastering |
| 2009 | Chrissi Poland | Songs From the Concrete | Mastering |
| 2009 | Joshua Panda | What We Have Sewn | Mastering |
| 2009 | Lloyd Banks | Stuntin' | Mastering |
| 2009 | Maria Neskovski | End of the Day | Mastering |
| 2009 | Pope Flyn | One Race | Mastering |
| 2009 | Michael Doane | The Soul Kitchen | Mastering |
| 2009 | US Royalty | Midsommar | Mastering |
| 2009 | Mandy Joy Miller | Here | Mastering |
| 2009 | 520 Music Group | A DJ's Dream vol. 1 music to | Mastering |
| 2009 | Emily Mure | Where I Began | Mastering |
| 2009 | Gurlhood | Zipper | Mastering |
| 2009 | Boss aka Hood Scholar | The Official Street EP | Mastering |
| 2009 | Lee Moran | All Things Have an Ending | Mastering |
| 2009 | Trey Songz | "I Invented Sex (Remix)" ft. Usher and Keri Hilson | Mastering |
| 2009 | Jim Jones | "Wishing On a Sucker MC" ft. Rev Run | Mastering |
| 2009 | 50 Cent | War Angel (mix tape) | Mastering |
| 2009 | Toni Braxton | "Yesterday (remix)" ft. Trey Songz | Mastering |
| 2009 | Beanie Sigel | "I Go Off" ft. 50 Cent | Mastering |
| 2009 | Stat Quo | "Ghetto USA" | Mastering |
| 2009 | 50 Cent | Before I Self Destruct | Mastering |
| 2009 | Canibus | Rip The Jacker (Instrumentals) | Mastering |
| 2009 | Trey Songz | Anticipation | Mastering |
| 2009 | Trey Songz | Ready | Mastering |
| 2009 | Tina Sugandh | You Without Me | Mastering |
| 2009 | The Ting Tings | "Great DJ" remixed by Soul Seekerz | Mastering |
| 2009 | The Bloodsugars | I Can't Go On, I'll Go On | Mastering |
| 2009 | Raekwon | Only Built 4 Cuban Linx, Pt. II | Mastering |
| 2009 | Porter Block | Pueblo A Go Go | Mastering |
| 2009 | Porter Block | The Gowanus Yacht Club | Mastering |
| 2009 | Keri Hilson | In a Perfect World... | Mastering |
| 2009 | Kat Danson | "Sugarfree" remix | Mastering |
| 2009 | JR Writer | Cinecrack | Mastering |
| 2009 | John Raymond Pollard | Dreams | Mastering |
| 2009 | John Carlin | Welcome to the Kids Music Underground | Mastering |
| 2009 | Israel Darling | Dinosaur Bones and Mechanical | Mastering |
| 2009 | Grand Puma | Retroactive | Mastering |
| 2009 | Elizabeth the Band | Elizabeth The Band | Mastering |
| 2009 | Depeche Mode | "Wrong" (Club Promo) | Mastering |
| 2009 | Canibus | Rip the Jacker | Mastering |
| 2009 | And Then There Was Christmas | What Doesn't Kill Us Makes Us Stronger | Mastering |
| 2009 | Anna Tsuchiya | Wasabi | Mastering |
| 2010 | April Smith | Songs for a Sinking Ship | Mastering |
| 2010 | Driis | High Class Problem Vol. 1 | Mastering |
| 2010 | OK Go | White Knuckles Remixes | Mastering |
| 2010 | Luke Wesley | Because We Never Talk About It | Mastering |
| 2010 | Capone-N-Noreaga | War Report 2: Before the War | Mastering |
| 2010 | Vinnie Paz | Season of the Assassin | Mastering |
| 2010 | Wakey! Wakey! | Almost Everything I Wish I'd Said the Last Time I Saw You | Mastering |
| 2010 | Trey Songz | Passion, Pain & Pleasure | Mastering |
| 2011 | Trey Songz | #LEMMEHOLDATBEAT2 | Mastering |
| 2011 | Trey Songz | Anticipation II | Mastering |
| 2011 | Good & Angry | The Age of Tormented Stone EP | Mastering |
| 2011 | Immortal Technique | Martyr | Mastering |
| 2011 | Slim the Mobster | War Music | Mastering |
| 2011 | Governor | "Crazy Life" | Mastering, mixing |
| 2011 | Lea Sunshine | "November Skies (11-11-11)" | Mastering |
| 2011 | Stereo Crowd | Stereo Crowd EP | Mastering |
| 2011 | The Debutante Hour | Follow Me | Mastering |
| 2011 | Genesis | Jackie Chan | Mastering |
| 2011 | Kidd Kidd | Reallionaire | Mastering |
| 2011 | Ras Beats feat. Masta Ace + Sadat X | "Let It Be + Survive" | Mastering |
| 2011 | Trav feat. Sean Kingston | "Up and Down" | Mastering, mixing |
| 2011 | Fred the Godson feat. Diddy | "Daddy Gettin' Money" | Mastering |
| 2011 | Tony Yayo feat. Waka Flocka Flame | "White Sheets" | Tracking |
| 2011 | Matt + Kim, Soulja Boy, + Andrew W.K. | I'm a Goner | Tracking |
| 2011 | Hot Rod | "Hot Girl" | Mastering |
| 2011 | Hot Rod | "Dance With Me" | Mastering |
| 2011 | Ryan Leslie | "Glory" | Mastering |
| 2011 | Various Artists | GBA3 | Mastering, tracking, mixing |
| 2011 | Jasmine V | S(HE) BE(LIE)VE(D) | Mastering, mixing |
| 2011 | Sean Garnett | "In Da Box" | Mastering, mixing |
| 2011 | Vado | "Always On" | Mastering, mixing |
| 2011 | The Cool Kids | When Fish Ride Bicycles | Mastering |
| 2011 | Raekwon | Shaolin vs. Wu-Tang | Mastering, mixing |
| 2011 | Angelo Moore (of Fishbone) | The Angelo Show | Mastering |
| 2011 | Lloyd Banks | The Cold Corner 2 | Mastering, mixing |
| 2011 | Lloyd Banks | "They Love Me in the Hood" | Mastering |
| 2011 | Lloyd Banks | "Check Me Out" | Mastering |
| 2011 | Lloyd Banks | Hunger for More 2 | Mastering |
| 2011 | Ness | "Hat Trick" | Mastering |
| 2011 | Ness | "Sonic Boom" | Mastering |
| 2011 | Ness feat. XV | "They Don't Really Care About Us" | Mastering |
| 2011 | Trey Songz | Inevitable EP | Mastering |
| 2011 | 50 Cent | The Big 10 | Mastering |
| 2011 | Jackie Chain | "Parked Outside" feat. Big K.R.I.T. & Bun B | Mastering |
| 2011 | Soulja Boy | "Ocean Mobb" feat. Waka Flocka Flame | Tracking |
| 2011 | The Color Bars | Prosopopoeia | Mastering |
| 2012 | Kofi Black | Love Sick | Mastering |
| 2012 | Torion Sellers | The Initiation | Mastering |
| 2012 | Torion Sellers | Scream Tour Mixtape | Mastering, tracking |
| 2012 | 360 | "What Goes Up" | Mastering, tracking |
| 2012 | The Peter Ulrich Collaboration | The Painted Caravan | Mastering |
| 2012 | Uncle Murda | "Money Work" Feat. French Montana | Mastering |
| 2012 | Michelle Sangali | Wild | Mastering |
| 2012 | Jasmine V | "Just a Friend" | Mastering |
| 2012 | Hank and Cupcakes | Ain't No Love | Mastering |
| 2012 | The Gregory Brothers | 4 Presidential Debates Songified | Mastering |
| 2012 | Trey Songz | Chapter V | Mastering |
| 2012 | Lloyd Banks | V.6: The Gift | Mastering |
| 2013 | The Perfect Wave (film) | The Lords Prayer | Mastering |
| 2013 | Trippz Michaud | The Adventures of Trippz Vol. 2 | Mastering |
| 2013 | Gue Pequeno | Black Roses | Mastering |
| 2013 | SBOE | All We Got Is Us | Mastering |
| 2013 | Prodigy & The Alchemist | Albert Einstein | Mastering |
| 2013 | Juelz Santana | Nothin' to Me | Mastering |
| 2013 | 98 Degrees | 2.0 | Mastering |
| 2013 | 50 Cent & Too $hort | First Date | Mastering |
| 2013 | 50 Cent | "We Up" Feat. Kendrick Lamar | Mastering |
| 2013 | Fedez | Miracle | Mastering |
| 2013 | Jasmine V | Breathe Your Love | Mastering |
| 2013 | Gué Pequeno | Bravo Ragazzo | Mastering |
| 2013 | Ron Isley | This Song is For You | Mastering |
| 2013 | Angel Haze | "No Bueno" | Mastering |
| 2013 | Po Johnson | Best Lie | Mastering |
| 2013 | Po Johnson | Femme Fatal | Mastering |
| 2013 | Po Johnson | Levitate | Mastering |
| 2013 | Trey Songz | Sensational | Mastering |
| 2013 | Joey Bada$$ | My Yout | Mastering |
| 2013 | Mr. Probz | The Treatment | Mastering |
| 2013 | Alex Young | Crash This Party | Mastering |
| 2013 | Loose Screws | No Tomorrow | Mastering |
| 2013 | Jake La Furia | Musica Commerciale | Mastering |
| 2013 | Jake La Furia | Inno Nazionale | Mastering |
| 2013 | Sammie | Dancer | Mastering |
| 2013 | Sammie | Passionately | Mastering |
| 2013 | Sammie | Mr. Bartender | Mastering |
| 2013 | DJ Cassidy | "Calling All Hearts" | Mastering |
| 2014 | Talib Kweli | Gravitas | Mastering |
| 2014 | Letoya Luckett | "Don't Make Me Wait" | Mastering |
| 2014 | 50 Cent | The Big 10 (Mixtape) | Mastering |
| 2014 | 50 Cent | The Lost Tape (Mixtape) | Mastering |
| 2014 | 50 Cent | 5 (Murder by Numbers) | Mastering |
| 2014 | Mobb Deep | The Infamous Mobb Deep | Mastering |
| 2014 | Naturi | Sweet Thang | Mastering |
| 2014 | Trey Songz | Trigga | Mastering |
| 2014 | Maxim | "Crazy" | Mastering |
| 2014 | Maxim | "Run Da World" | Mastering |
| 2014 | Maxim | "Dolla Bill " | Mastering |
| 2014 | Maxim | "World Wide Sound" | Mastering |
| 2014 | 50 Cent | Don't Worry About It | Mastering |
| 2014 | 50 Cent | Big Rich Town | Mastering |
| 2014 | Mr. Probz | "Waves" Remix | Mastering |
| 2014 | Trey Songz | "Ordinary" | Mastering |
| 2014 | Mr. Probz | Now or Never | Mastering |
| 2014 | Mr. Probz | "Nothing Really Matters" | Mastering |
| 2014 | Lil Boosie | Heart of a Lion | Mastering |
| 2014 | Immortal Technique | The Martyr | Mastering |
| 2014 | Scarface | "No Problem" | Mastering |
| 2014 | Trey Songz & Chris Brown | Trga X Brzy | Mastering |
| 2014 | G-Unit | The Beauty of Independence EP | Mastering |
| 2014 | 50 Cent | "Nah I'm Talkin Bout" | Mastering |
| 2014 | Constant Flow | Ascension | Mastering |
| 2014 | 50 Cent | Animal Ambition | Mastering |
| 2014 | Boyz II Men | Collide | Mastering |
| 2014 | Two Tone Ft. Ñengo Flow & Erik Machado | Señorita | Mastering |
| 2014 | Johnny Gill | Game Changer | Mastering |
| 2014 | Vy Higgensen | We Are | Mastering |
| 2015 | Joey Bada$$ | B4.Da.$$ | Mastering |
| 2015 | Trey Songz | Slow Motion | Mastering |
| 2015 | Trey Songz | Trigga Reloaded | Mastering |
| 2015 | Trey Songz | Intermission 1 & 2 | Mastering |
| 2015 | 50 Cent | Get Low feat. Jeremih, T.I. & 2 Chainz | Mastering |
| 2015 | Mr. Probz | Nothing Really Matters Afrojack Remix | Mastering |
| 2015 | Esther Dean | I know A Secret EP | Mastering |
| 2015 | Soundtrack Album | Brotherly Love | Mastering |
| 2015 | Case | Heaven's Door | Mastering |
| 2015 | The Rooks | Wires | Mastering, mixing, production |
| 2015 | Blue Woods | City Life | Mastering, mixing, production |
| 2015 | Ryan Leslie | MZRT- Lifetime Album | Mastering |
| 2015 | Talib Kweli | F*ck The Money | Mastering |
| 2015 | 50 Cent | 9 Shots | Mastering |
| 2016 | 50 Cent | No Romeo | Mastering |
| 2016 | 1966 | ERR Compilation | Mastering |
| 2016 | the MIND | | Mastering |
| 2016 | Cameco | Only Love | Mastering |
| 2016 | Haze | Tired | Mastering |
| 2016 | KAMAUU | JusFaYa | Mastering |
| 2016 | Hank and Cupcakes | Cheap Thrill | Mastering |
| 2016 | Bradley Gentz | Affect Me | Mastering |
| 2016 | Ricki Woodland | Lonely | Mastering |
| 2016 | Mr Probz | Fine Ass Mess | Mixing & Mastering |
| 2016 | Edward Jackson | Let You Know | Mastering |
| 2016 | Audra The Rapper | Think Bout Me | Mastering |
| 2016 | Don Benjamin | Touch My Body | Mastering |
| 2016 | Edward Jackson | Never Let Tears Show | Mastering |
| 2016 | 88-Keys | All We Need, All About You | Mastering |
| 2016 | Gonzalo Contreras | Truth Be Told | Mastering |
| 2016 | R Money | Change | Mastering |
| 2016 | Lamont | Huge Flirt | Mastering |
| 2016 | Peter Block | A New Beginning | Mastering |
| 2016 | 3rd Ghost | Album | Mastering |
| 2016 | Jade de LaFluer | Toxic Sunset | Mastering |
| 2016 | Joshua Black | Damn Gucci | Mastering |
| 2016 | Young Futura | Slow It Down/Patience EP | Mastering |
| 2016 | Fergie | M.I.L.F. $ | Mastering |
| 2016 | Steve Singh | Bequarar | Mastering |
| 2016 | City Canyons | Artificial Man | Mastering |
| 2016 | Jasmine V | Give Me More | Mastering |
| 2016 | Yahuska Kalev | Vibes In The Hills | Mastering |
| 2016 | Joey Badass | My Yung | Mastering |
| 2016 | Talib Kweli | In The Ghetto | Mastering |
| 2016 | Ron Oneal | Product N Da Bando | Mastering |
| 2016 | Robyn Hood | EP | Mastering |
| 2016 | Apeksha | Sawarya | Mastering |
| 2016 | Novum Kix | Club Stamp | Mastering |
| 2016 | Johnny Gill | 5000 Miles | Mastering |
| 2016 | Lyrica Anderson | Give It To Me | Mastering |
| 2016 | Salmo | Don Mellin | Mastering |
| 2016 | 88-Keys | ICBSUNM | Mastering |
| 2016 | Edward Jackson | No Luck | Mastering |
| 2016 | K'Valentine | Here For A Reason Album | Mastering |
| 2016 | Lorna Percy | | Mastering |
| 2016 | Maxim | Dub Chemist, U Ready, Revolution | Mastering |
| 2016 | Children of Skeezy | EP | Mastering |
| 2016 | Loose Screws | EP | Mastering |
| 2016 | Talib Kweli | Album | Mastering |
| 2016 | Carl Thomas | Happy Hour | Mastering |
| 2016 | Mr Probz | Tell You I Love You | Mastering |
| 2016 | Rob Bailey | EP | Mastering |
| 2016 | Fedez & J-Ax | Assenzio | Mastering |
| 2016 | Mercury and The Architects | Album | Mastering |
| 2016 | Abby Lakew | Yene Habesha | Mastering |
| 2016 | Trey Songz | Coming Home (Christmas) | Mastering |
| 2016 | Patrick Carmicheal | Album | Mastering |
| 2016 | Porter Block | Hard to See Beautiful | Mastering |
| 2016 | KAMAUU | The Mint | Mastering |
| 2016 | Supercute | We Don't Need No Boys (Single) | Mastering |
| 2016 | Edward Jackson | Birds Fly Blue | Mastering |
| 2016 | Andrea Daly | Warm For The Winter | Mastering |
| 2016 | Fedez & J-Ax | Comunisti Col Rolex (Album) | Mastering |
| 2016 | Maxim | Fire Letter Word/Money Money EP | Mastering |
| 2016 | Mike Angel | Album | Mastering |
| 2016 | Raekwon | The Wild (Album) | Mastering |
| 2016 | Sam Barron | Just Couldn't Help Myself | Mastering |
| 2016 | Apeksha | Sawarya (Single) | Mastering |
| 2016 | On The Sun | Bird On Wire (EP) | Mastering |
| 2016 | Nicky March | Album | Mastering |
| 2017 | Sierra Thomas | New Beginnings | Mastering |
| 2017 | Rotimi | Nobody (feat. 50 cent & T.I.) | Mastering |
| 2017 | Trey Songz | Anticipation 3 | Mastering |
| 2017 | Alvin Dunston | Jail Bird | Mastering |
| 2017 | Talib Kweli | The Leviathan | Mastering |
| 2017 | Talib Kweli & Styles P | Seven | Mastering |
| 2017 | JR | In Love With The Money | Mastering |
| 2017 | Solo Lucci | Sidechick | Mastering |
| 2017 | LL Goat | Baby's On Fire (Rocked) | Mastering |
| 2017 | JD | Give It 2 U | Mastering |
| 2017 | Apeksha | Sawarya | Mastering |
| 2017 | Niqa Mor | Thursday Night - EP | Mastering |
| 2017 | Moses | Panic Run | Mastering |
| 2017 | Mr Probz | American Dreaming/Tears Gone Bad | Mastering |
| 2017 | K'Valentine | Soul Searching/Hard Work | Mastering |
| 2017 | Damien Escobar | Boundless | Mastering |
| 2017 | City Canyon | Severley Blessed | Mastering |
| 2017 | Jason Mason | Invisible | Mastering |
| 2017 | Mercury and the Architects | Genesis | Mixing & Mastering |
| 2017 | Jade | Party2BodyParty | Mastering |
| 2017 | Mr Probz | Streets | Mastering |
| 2017 | KAMAUU | uRTHGoLD | Mastering |
| 2017 | Mr Probz | Gone | Mastering |
| 2017 | Andrew Gregory | EP | Mastering |
| 2017 | NeMISS | Rules | Mastering |
| 2017 | Uncle Murda | Statute of Limitations | Mastering |
| 2017 | Don Joe | Club Doggo (remastered) | Mastering |
| 2017 | Disco Black | ooh yes/omg/believers/sidechick/overnight | Mastering |
| 2017 | Loaded Lux | Handles/Fate | Mastering |
| 2017 | Dan Strong | Strollin | Mastering |
| 2017 | Peter Block | So Mean/Always Right | Mastering |
| 2017 | Robert C Everett | We Lit/Victory | Mastering |
| 2017 | Julian Giaimo | Can't Go Back | Mastering |
| 2017 | Cromo | Tonico | Mastering |
| 2017 | City Canyons | Lessons of Love | Mastering |
| 2017 | Carl Thomas | Happy Hour | Mastering |
| 2017 | Peggy Sarlin | Album | Mastering |
| 2017 | Disco Black | Dusse Inna Cup | Mastering |
| 2017 | David Clauro | EP | Mastering |
| 2017 | REB | Album | Mastering |
| 2017 | Rotimi | Jeep Music | Mastering |
| 2017 | Ralph Carballal | Checkin Out/Don't Think Twice/City of N.O. | Mastering |
| 2017 | Patrick Picard | Errnight | Mastering |
| 2017 | Uncle Murda | On & On (feat 50 cent & Jeremiah) | Mastering |
| 2017 | Abby Lakew | Gonder Danny/Bel Engedhe | Mastering |
| 2017 | Saints of 35th Street | Album | Mastering |
| 2017 | Manuel Alejandro | Que Siga La Gozadera | Mastering |
| 2017 | Breeze Dollaz | Album | Mastering |
| 2017 | Hannah Bush | Summertime Anytime | Mastering |
| 2017 | Streets First | Streets First INTRO | Mastering |
| 2017 | What Is Broken | Jason's Song | Mixing & Mastering |
| 2017 | Alan Longo | EP | Mastering |
| 2017 | Amen-Ra | Silhouette | Mastering |
| 2017 | Twanee | Album | Mastering |
| 2017 | Lloyd Banks | Mo Money (Overload) | Mastering |
| 2017 | Disco Black | Dimelo | Mastering |
| 2017 | Izzy Ye | Maintain/Its ok/What you thought/confessions | Mastering |
| 2017 | Squidnice | Album | Mastering |
| 2017 | Chris Lawrence (Pulse Music) | Dreamin | Mastering |
| 2017 | Avishahani | Faded | Mastering |
| 2017 | City Canyons | Hawk Dreams | Mastering |
| 2017 | Mercury and the Architects | Disinformation | Mastering |
| 2017 | K'Valentine | Foreplay Remix | Mastering |
| 2017 | Mercury and the Architects | Machine | Mastering |
| 2017 | 50 cent | Yea Yea | Mastering |
| 2017 | PARTYNEXTDOOR | Put It On Silent | Mastering |
| 2017 | Shinah | Work/GOD | Mastering |
| 2017 | DICE | Freestyles | Mastering |
| 2017 | Disco Black | Want You | Mastering |
| 2017 | Rico Davis | Fire Away/Do U Wanna/The Cure | Mastering |
| 2017 | GNL Zamba & Miriam Tamar | Album | Mastering |
| 2017 | SES Vth | Album | Mastering |
| 2017 | Kayla | Low, The Carnival Day | Mastering |
| 2017 | Disco Black | Flex | Mastering |
| 2017 | Black Plastic | Savage, Charcoal | Mastering |
| 2017 | Maxim | Can't Hold We, Get Mine | Mastering |
| 2017 | Joseph Shim | Give All To Jesus | Mastering |
| 2017 | Barry Antoine | Album | Mastering |
| 2017 | Pulse Music | Unanswered Questions | Mastering |
| 2017 | Ange Lloyd | Revival Remix Package | Mastering |
| 2017 | Noochie | How Could I | Mastering |
| 2017 | Vedo | 4 Walls, Slow | Mastering |
| 2017 | DRK | Amnesia | Mastering |
| 2017 | Pulse Music | Do You Know, Long Way Down, Never Gonna Give You Up | Mastering |
| 2017 | Rotimi | Kitchen Table REMIX | Mastering |
| 2017 | Jade | Wave | Mastering |
| 2017 | Young Buck | Album | Mastering |
| 2017 | Jream | EP | Mastering |
| 2017 | 50 cent | Nothing | Mastering |
| 2017 | Raja ft. Tory Lanez | Island Gyal | Mastering |
| 2017 | Sino | Sino | Mastering |
| 2017 | Darren Fewins | Stuck On You | Mastering |
| 2017 | Pulse Music | Fortune | Mastering |
| 2017 | Mr. Probz | Space For Two, Whatever You Like, Strawberry Moonshine, There You Go | Mastering |
| 2017 | Don Henderson | No Chaser | Mastering |
| 2017 | Sampson Rawls | Singdi | Mastering |
| 2017 | David Black | Album | Mastering |
| 2017 | Frankie C | Christmas Songs | Mastering |
| 2017 | Disco Black | Album | Mastering |
| 2017 | Fergie | Double Dutchess | Mastering |
| 2017 | Trey Songz | Tremaine | Mastering |
| 2017 | Talib Kweli | Radio Silence | Mastering |
| 2018 | Trey Songz | Song Goes Off (Acoustic RMX) | Mastering |
| 2018 | Jared Lee | Professional Lovers | Mastering |
| 2018 | Yahusha Kalev | Riots | Mastering |
| 2018 | Izzi C | Liber8ion EP | Mastering |
| 2018 | Zana | Album | Mastering |
| 2018 | Young Buck | Can't Lose | Mastering |
| 2018 | 50 Cent | Going Crazy | Mastering |
| 2018 | Joka | This Ain't It | Mastering |
| 2018 | Summer | Touch, Walk On By, Gid Tall Issues | Mastering |
| 2018 | City Canyons | Pirate Jane | Mastering |
| 2018 | Rob Bailey | Album | Mastering |
| 2018 | Masi | Confetti | Mastering |
| 2018 | Fame'O | Album | Mastering |
| 2018 | Cinematic Records | VA EP | Mastering |
| 2018 | D-Mo | G-Unit - 100 Million | Mastering |
| 2018 | Richard Edwards | Ego | Mastering |
| 2018 | Ronnie Kash | EP | Mastering |
| 2018 | Little Distractions | Braided Hair | Mastering |
| 2018 | Flipp Dinero | Leave Me Alone EP | Mastering |
| 2018 | Squidnice | Flex ft. Flipp Dinero | Mastering |
| 2018 | Abby Jasmine | Who Told You | Mastering |
| 2018 | Paula DeAnda | Don't Worry/MeYou Nah/You Should Best It | Mastering |
| 2018 | Bradly Gentz | Dreams | Mastering |
| 2018 | Cinematic Records | Slayed | Mastering |
| 2018 | Cinematic Records | Danger | Mastering |
| 2018 | Tobias | Album | Mastering |
| 2018 | Masspike Miles | Sober | Mastering |
| 2018 | Arc and Stone | Firetruck, Now or Never | Mastering |
| 2018 | LOWFi | BNF ft. Jayy Grams & Von Wilda | Mastering |
| 2018 | LOWFi | Dew it All | Mastering |
| 2018 | Flipp Dinero | Stackin | Mastering |
| 2018 | Flipp Dinero | Feelin Like | Mastering |
| 2018 | Fedez & J-Ax | Italiana | Mastering |
| 2018 | Jalani Joseph | Whatever You Want | Mastering |
| 2018 | Get In The Pool | Album | Mastering |
| 2018 | Fame'O | Weight | Mastering |
| 2018 | Damien Escobar | New Things | Mastering |
| 2018 | Tru Life | Baddie | Mastering |
| 2018 | Alan T (Engineer) | Trop Vivant | Mastering |
| 2018 | SAARA | Sangria | Mastering |
| 2018 | What is Broken | Meant To Be | Mixing & Mastering |
| 2018 | Rachel Bristol | Love Letter | Mastering |
| 2018 | Alan Longo | Fuck/She Need It | Mastering |
| 2018 | Young Buck | NY Shit | Mastering |
| 2018 | 50 Cent | Get the Strap | Mastering |
| 2018 | Young Buck | Album | Mastering |
| 2018 | Jessica Lowndes | Broken Birds | Mastering |
| 2018 | Anthony Coelho | Album | Mastering |
| 2018 | August English | Worth | Mastering |
| 2018 | Nigil Mack | EP for Movie | Mastering |
| 2018 | Markus Schulz | Upon My Shoulder | Mastering |
| 2018 | Rob Grimaldi | Truth or Dare | Mastering |
| 2018 | Avi | EP | Mastering |
| 2018 | Loaded Lux | Jammin | Mastering |
| 2018 | Avi | EP | Mastering |
| 2018 | Sofi Green | Bag Alert | Mastering |
| 2018 | Haiko | My Way | Mastering |
| 2018 | Alan Longo | Speak for me/One more night | Mastering |
| 2018 | Sean Gill | Ruthless/Lighters/Made A Broke | Mastering |
| 2018 | Young Futura | EP | Mastering |
| 2018 | Jasmine | Fearless | Mastering |
| 2018 | Noel | Otherside | Mastering |
| 2018 | Sean Gill | Dumb It Down | Mastering |
| 2018 | Only1Skoota | Million | Mastering |
| 2018 | Young Buck | Album | Mastering |
| 2018 | David You | Album | Mastering |
| 2018 | Ian Mellencamp | Single | Mastering |
| 2018 | Michael Rethorn | Chrome | Mastering |
| 2018 | JB | Sunrise Sunset | Mastering |
| 2018 | Andrea Daly | Warm For The Weather | Mastering |
| 2018 | Emis Killa | Album | Mastering |
| 2018 | Mercury and the Architects | Images | Mastering |
| 2018 | Jake Mason | Again, My Heart | Mastering |
| 2018 | Big Wake | Album | Mastering |
| 2018 | Jamballaz | Pull Over, For The Money, Look At You | Mastering |
| 2018 | Biana | Love You Today | Mastering |
| 2018 | Zerk | Low | Mastering |
| 2018 | Young Buck | Felonies | Mastering |
| 2018 | TV | Word To The Gang | Mastering |
| 2018 | Darren & TJ | Stockholm | Mastering |
| 2018 | KAMAUU | Clover, Bamboo, Ivy, Juniper | Mastering |
| 2018 | Pat Lillis | EP | Mastering |
| 2018 | Darren | Finest Hour | Mastering |
| 2018 | Run | Run Commercial | Mastering |
| 2018 | Ginger | Ginger | Mastering |
| 2018 | Yungeen Ace | Album | Mastering |
| 2018 | Dorit Kong | Satellite | Mastering |
| 2018 | Louka | Truth or Dare | Mastering |
| 2019 | Abby Jasmine | The Block | Mastering |
| 2019 | Zwakker | Trots | Mastering |
| 2019 | Tony Dophat | Dust Bags | Mastering |
| 2019 | Fame'O | Weight | Mastering |
| 2019 | Abby Jasmine | Relax | Mastering |
| 2019 | Kool Kidd Dre | Forgot How, Danger, Full Disclosure, Better You, Way Different | Mastering |
| 2019 | Ginger & Jaap | Zabder Jou | Mastering |
| 2019 | Hayelo | Album | Mastering |
| 2019 | Yung Cassius | F U C K Love | Mastering |
| 2019 | KAMAUU | Sweat | Mastering |
| 2019 | Smoke DZA | Legend Has It, Harsh Reality, Thoughts.Com | Mastering |
| 2019 | Mercury and the Architects | Spies | Mastering |
| 2019 | Yungeen Ace | Catch A Body | Mastering |
| 2019 | Shinah | Gods and Earths/Envy | Mastering |
| 2019 | City Canyons | Squaring The Circle | Mastering |
| 2019 | T-Pain | 1UP | Mastering |
| 2019 | Black Plastic | Savage, Charcoal | Mastering |
| 2019 | Louie The Human | Make You Sick | Mastering |
| 2019 | Trey Songz | Jill Scott | Mastering |
| 2019 | Cero Ismael | Dancer | Mastering |
| 2019 | Deenucka Johnson | Low | Mastering |
| 2019 | Maya Shanti | Piin In M'n Hart | Mastering |
| 2019 | Freddie Foolay | Big Vibe | Mastering |
| 2019 | Ayden | Cali, Se La Trae, Alcohol | Mastering |
| 2019 | Johnny Gill | Soul Of A Woman | Mastering |
| 2019 | SAARA | If I ruled the World, Soon | Mastering |
| 2019 | Damien Escobar | Secret Garden | Mastering |
| 2019 | Chloe Jane | Falling, 6 Rings, Patience, I Don't Give A Shit, Casual, Celebrate, Give Me A Clue, 16 | Mastering |
| 2019 | Ginger | Album | Mastering |
| 2019 | Only1Skoota | Mixtape | Mastering |
| 2019 | Sheff G | The Unluccy Luccy Kid | Mastering |
| 2019 | Sleepy Hallow | I Get Love | Mastering |
| 2019 | Freddie Foolay | Touch Sreeems | Mastering |
| 2019 | What Is Broken | Jason's Song | Mastering |
| 2019 | Avi | Get Afraid | Mastering |
| 2019 | Ginger | Are You GGENGRAT | Mastering |
| 2019 | Adam Salaah | Onomatopoeia | Mastering |
| 2019 | Anders | Yesterday, I Wanna Hold Your Hand | Mastering |
| 2019 | Black Arawack Jamballaz | Good Girl | Mastering |
| 2019 | Ginger | Linker Lane | Mastering |
| 2019 | Only1Skoota | Mixtape | Mastering |
| 2019 | Only1Skoota | 3rd | Mastering |
| 2019 | Tedy Andreas | Mad Illusions | Mastering |
| 2019 | Chocolate Steele | We Don't Rock, We Are Winners, Brand New Day | Mastering |
| 2019 | River | Break Me Open | Mastering |
| 2019 | Karim Diane | Adjust | Mastering |
| 2019 | Ronald Derise | Sans Jesu, Jedi Renman | Mastering |
| 2019 | Charles Farrar | Give It To You Remix | Mastering |
| 2019 | Ginger | Hoodie OP | Mastering |
| 2019 | Rob Bailey | Busted | Mastering |
| 2019 | Chris Aguayo | Find My Oo Lala, Lucid Girl | Mastering |
| 2019 | Chris Weeks | Doctor, Angel | Mastering |
| 2019 | ChildsPlay and FRSH | Tijger | Mastering |
| 2019 | Ginger | Album | Mastering |
| 2019 | Yves | Medicijn | Mastering |
| 2019 | Slim the Mobster | Album | Mastering |
| 2019 | Miles Sterling | Bouncing and Jumping | Mastering |
| 2019 | Damien Escobar | Merry Little Xmas | Mastering |
| 2019 | Agustina | Love Buzzed | Mastering |
| 2019 | Logan Thomas | One More Chapter | Mastering |
| 2019 | Jada Michael | Dance | Mastering |
| 2019 | Pop Smoke | Meet the Woo, Flexin, MPR | Mastering |
| 2019 | 50 Cent | Big Rich Town | Mastering |
| 2020 | Dreddy | Album | Mastering |
| 2020 | J-Ax | ReAle | Mastering |
| 2020 | Samuel Huertas | Samuel Huertas | Mastering |
| 2020 | Trav Torch | Give It To Me Baby | Mastering |
| 2020 | Sam Barron | New York | Mastering |
| 2020 | Trav Torch | Ecstasy | Mastering |
| 2020 | Emma Stephenson | Album | Mastering |
| 2020 | Wilson Castillo | La Leche | Mastering |
| 2020 | Genesiz | Your Love | Mastering |
| 2020 | Ginger | Verduren ft. Bibi Espina & Jaap Goud | Mastering |
| 2020 | The Surrge | Better | Mastering |
| 2020 | Eubanks | Album | Mastering |
| 2020 | Ralph Tresvant ft. Johnny Gill | All Mine | Mastering |
| 2020 | Alana K. | Powerful | Mastering |
| 2020 | Darren Fewins | Working On It | Mastering |
| 2020 | Ginger | Voor Goed | Mastering |
| 2020 | Gaidaa | Falling Higher | Mastering |
| 2020 | Ali Bishop | King Dog | Mastering |
| 2020 | Graham Marlitt | Warm Ocean | Mastering |
| 2020 | Trav Torch | Run It Back | Mastering |
| 2020 | Kai Da Kyd | Never Resting | Mastering |
| 2020 | Chimbala | Alcohol ft. Chimbala | Mastering |
| 2020 | Timi Timminen | Album | Mastering |
| 2020 | Trey Songz | Circles | Mastering |
| 2020 | Trey Songz | Be My Guest | Mastering |
| 2020 | Chris Aguayo | The One | Mastering |
| 2020 | Young Futura | Les Gens | Mastering |
| 2020 | Young Futura | Heartbeat | Mastering |
| 2020 | Young Futura | Take A Chance | Mastering |
| 2020 | Sha Money XL | Chain On The Bike | Mastering |
| 2020 | Eddi | Album | Mastering |
| 2020 | Black Plastic | Savage Actors Remix | Mastering |
| 2020 | Mercury and the Architects | See the World | Mastering |
| 2020 | Black Plastic | Flowers | Mastering |
| 2020 | Tribe Lovinditekai | God's Love | Mastering |
| 2020 | Ginger | Hier En Nu | Mastering |
| 2020 | Terry Ellis | ABW | Mastering |
| 2020 | Young Futura | Album | Mastering |
| 2020 | Chloe | Gemini | Mastering |
| 2020 | Mark Collins | Scream Inside Your Heart | Mastering |
| 2020 | Adam Salaah | In N Out | Mastering |
| 2020 | Chris Manno | Don't Go Away | Mastering |
| 2020 | Adam Salaah | Where U At | Mastering |
| 2020 | Ginger | Overboord | Mastering |
| 2020 | Chris Aguayo | All We Have Us | Mastering |
| 2020 | OMC Ant | Flavors | Mastering |
| 2020 | Demetrius M | Album | Mastering |
| 2020 | Black Plastic | Club Grotesque | Mastering |
| 2020 | Ginger | Probleem | Mastering |
| 2020 | Mercury and the Architects | Autopilot | Mastering |
| 2020 | Mercury and the Architects | Punching Bag | Mastering |
| 2020 | Hector PM | Time | Mastering |
| 2020 | Keytona | Fan ft. Keytona | Mastering |
| 2020 | Keytona | Do It Like Me | Mastering |
| 2020 | Norel | Say Goodbye | Mastering |
| 2020 | Flashback | Regular | Mastering |
| 2020 | Flashback | Double Cup | Mastering |
| 2020 | Melissa Jordano | Mini Van | Mastering |
| 2020 | Heartbreak Papi | Album | Mastering |
| 2020 | Ginger | Sinds '93 ft. Mikki | Mastering |
| 2020 | Cero Ismael | Tell Me How | Mastering |
| 2020 | Mercury and the Architects | Cage | Mastering |
| 2020 | Alex E. | Friends | Mastering |
| 2021 | Asha | Rain | Mastering |
| 2021 | Asha | Where Are You Now | Mastering |
| 2021 | Asha | Keep Fallin | Mastering |
| 2021 | City Canyons | Achilles Back From The Dead | Mastering |
| 2021 | City Canyons | Spanish Moss And Mysteries | Mastering |
| 2021 | City Canyons | Sister Sangfroid | Mastering |
| 2021 | City Canyons | Reflections In A Funkhouse Mirror | Mastering |
| 2021 | City Canyons | Little Dancer Makes Her Getaway | Mastering |
| 2021 | City Canyons | Presentiment | Mastering |
| 2021 | Damien Escobar | One World | Mastering |
| 2021 | GSimone | Away We Go | Mastering |
| 2021 | KRS One | Krazy | Mastering |
| 2021 | KRS One | Knock Em Out The Box | Mastering |
| 2021 | Yves | Wait On Me | Mastering |
| 2021 | Yves | No Cap | Mastering |
| 2021 | Yves | Take It Easy | Mastering |
| 2021 | Yves | I'm Unique | Mastering |
| 2021 | Yves | OCD | Mastering |
| 2021 | Dre Swisher | MegaMan | Mastering |
| 2021 | Rossi | Smooth Talk | Mastering |
| 2022 | Conway The Machine | God Don't Make Mistakes | Mastering |
| 2023 | Chris Glaz | Me Dejaste Pa Después | Mastering |
| 2023 | DA'VAE | HMU | Mastering |
| 2023 | DA'VAE | Low Expectations | Mastering |
| 2023 | DA'VAE | Momo | Mastering |
| 2023 | DA'VAE | Terrified! | Mastering |
| 2023 | DA'VAE | When I Go | Mastering |
| 2023 | DA'VAE | Zippo | Mastering |
| 2023 | Jiggz | Drop the Loc | Mastering |
| 2023 | stag | you look dashing in red | Mastering |
| 2023 | Elektragaaz | Dancing A Little Tipsy, With Shorty | Mastering |
| 2023 | Elektragaaz | Lady Hannah Fights The Red Demon | Mastering |
| 2023 | Elektragaaz | The Cheerful Dead | Mastering |
| 2023 | Elektragaaz | Things Take A Turn | Mastering |
| 2023 | Elektragaaz | Tropical Sway | Mastering |
| 2023 | Elektragaaz | We May Die But We Will Not Rust | Mastering |
| 2023 | Conway The Machine & Jae Skeese | Cocaine Paste | Mastering |
| 2023 | Conway The Machine & Jae Skeese | Immaculate Reception | Mastering |
| 2023 | Conway The Machine & Jae Skeese | Le Chop | Mastering |
| 2023 | Conway The Machine & Jae Skeese | Metallic 5s | Mastering |
| 2023 | Conway The Machine & Jae Skeese | Promise | Mastering |
| 2023 | Conway The Machine & Jae Skeese | Stefon Diggs | Mastering |
| 2023 | Jayson Echo | Luna Llena | Mastering |
| 2023 | Jayson Echo | A 1000 Flowers | Mastering |
| 2023 | Jayson Echo | Slide | Mastering |
| 2023 | Love, Austin | Airheart | Mastering |
| 2023 | Jae Skeese | Ekin3 | Mastering |
| 2023 | Jae Skeese | Mind Right | Mastering |
| 2023 | Jae Skeese | Red Kool Aid | Mastering |
| 2023 | Jae Skeese | 1 of 1 | Mastering |
| 2023 | Jae Skeese | Burner Phone | Mastering |
| 2023 | Jae Skeese | Auntie Crystal | Mastering |
| 2023 | Jae Skeese | Lunch Table | Mastering |
| 2023 | Jae Skeese | RVLVR | Mastering |
| 2023 | Jae Skeese | Million Dollar Dreamz | Mastering |
| 2023 | Jae Skeese | Out Here | Mastering |
| 2023 | Jae Skeese | Symmetry | Mastering |
| 2023 | Jae Skeese | Sideline Saga | Mastering |
| 2023 | Jae Skeese | Bonneville | Mastering |
| 2023 | The Kid Daytona & Scram Jones | Vogue 2.0 | Mastering |
| 2023 | Classified | People | Mastering |
| 2023 | Ginger | LANGE ADEM. | Mastering |
| 2023 | Conway The Machine | Stab Out | Mastering |
| 2023 | Conway The Machine | Monogram | Mastering |
| 2023 | Conway The Machine | Brooklyn Chop House | Mastering |
| 2023 | Conway The Machine | Killa Judas | Mastering |
| 2023 | Conway The Machine | Flesh of my Flesh | Mastering |
| 2023 | Conway The Machine | Super Bowl | Mastering |
| 2023 | Conway The Machine, Goosebytheway, & Drea D'Nur | Kanye | Mastering |
| 2023 | Conway The Machine & Goosebytheway | Tween Cross Tween | Mastering |
| 2023 | Miranda | Porcelain Dolls | Mastering |
| 2023 | Amxxr | PAID FULLY | Mastering |
| 2023 | Amxxr | ONE IN A BILLION | Mastering |
| 2023 | Amxxr | WALK LIGHT TALK HEAVY | Mastering |
| 2023 | Amxxr | DEACON JONES | Mastering |
| 2023 | Amxxr | TELL ME IF YOU... | Mastering |
| 2023 | Amxxr | CREATE LIFE | Mastering |
| 2023 | Amxxr | BOARDED WINDOWS | Mastering |
| 2023 | YKG Hotboy | Cha Cha | Mastering |
| 2023 | Ma Barker | Now You Know | Mastering |
| 2024 | Ice Spice | On the Radar - Bonus | ATMOS Mixing |
| 2024 | Conway The Machine | Give and Give, Ten/Rya Interlude (feat. Rya Maxwell) | Mastering |
| 2024 | Conway The Machine & Jae Skeese | Pain Provided Profit | Mastering |
| 2024 | Juvenile Baby | I Need Answers | Mastering, ATMOS mix |
| 2024 | Juvenile Baby | Talm Bout | ATMOS Mixing |
| 2024 | Juvenile Baby | Silly Rabbit | ATMOS Mixing |
| 2024 | Skilla Baby | Crack Music 3 | ATMOS Mixing |
| 2024 | Hotboii | No Feelings | ATMOS Mixing |
| 2024 | Jae Skeese, Project Pat, & ILL Tone | Fruits Of The Labor | Mastering |
| 2025 | Skilla Baby | Plate | Mastering |
| 2025 | Skilla Baby | So Bad (with 4batz) | ATMOS Mixing |
| 2025 | Eminem | The Coupe De Grace Mix with DJ Scram Jones | Mastering |
| 2025 | Jae Skeese | 40 Hours | Mastering |
| 2025 | Anik Khan | ONĒK | Mastering |
| 2025 | Big Opp | BIG OPPORTUNITY | Mastering |
| 2025 | Mob Deep | Infinite | Mastering, ATMOS Mixing |
| 2025 | Big L | Harlem's Finest: Return of the King | Mastering, ATMOS Mixing |
| 2025 | Raekwon | The Emperor's New Clothes | Mastering, ATMOS Mixing |
| 2025 | Screwly G | Loaded | Mastering, ATMOS Mixing |
