= Guilt by Association =

Guilt by Association may refer to:

- Association fallacy, sometimes called guilt by association
- Felony murder rule
- Guilty by Association (album), the debut album by State of Shock
- Guilt by Association, an album by Creaming Jesus
- Guilt by Association Vol. 1, album by Engine Room Recordings
- Guilt by Association Vol. 2, album by Engine Room Recordings
- Guilt by Association Vol. 3, album by Engine Room Recordings
- Guilty by Association (film), 2003 American film starring Morgan Freeman
