= Guilt by Association Vol. 4 =

Compilation album by various artists
- Released: July 8, 2016
- Genre: Indie rock, indie folk
- Label: Team Mensch

Various artists chronology
Guilt by Association Vol. 3 (2011)	Guilt by Association Vol. 4 (2016)

Guilt by Association Vol. 4 is a compilation album released July 8, 2016 by Team Mensch. Like its previous installments, Guilt by Association Vol. 1, Guilt by Association Vol. 2 and Guilt by Association Vol. 3, Guilt By Association Vol. 4 features indie rock artists covering popular songs.

== Overview ==
In this, the fourth in the series of compilations, Guilt by Association Vol. 4 features indie rock artists, including Chris Collingwood, Mike Doughty and Rachael Yamagata, covering their favorite songs. The theme of this album is that all the songs are covers of songs from 1966.

== Track listing ==
#	Title	Artist(s)	Covered Artist
1	"Summer in the City (feat. Potty Mouth)"	Chris Collingwood	The Lovin' Spoonful
2	"Paint It Black"	Johnny Flame & The Jaws Of Victory	The Rolling Stones
3	"Shapes of Things"	Lucy Woodward	The Yardbirds
4	"Moonchild"	Mike Doughty	Captain Beefheart
5	"Rain"	Hurricane Bells	The Beatles
6	"You Don't Have to Say You Love Me"	Mike Viola	Dusty Springfield
7	"When a Man Loves a Woman"	Rachael Yamagata	Percy Sledge
8	"Sweet Young Thing"	The Frodis Capers	The Monkees
9	"Ain't Too Proud to Beg"	Makuta	The Temptations
10	"Dead End Street"	Porter Block	The Kinks
11	"Homeward Bound"	Vandaveer	Simon & Garfunkel
12	"Tomorrow Never Knows"	Spaceface	The Beatles

== See also ==
- Guilt by Association Vol. 1
- Guilt by Association Vol. 2
- Guilt by Association Vol. 3
