= Murder mystery (disambiguation) =

A murder mystery is a work of crime fiction.

Murder mystery may also refer to:

- Murder Mystery (band), an American rock band
- Murder Mystery (film), a 2019 American comedy mystery film
- "Murder Mystery" (Schitt's Creek), a television episode
- "Murder Mystery", a song by Edan from Beauty and the Beat, 2005
- "The Murder Mystery", a song by the Velvet Underground from The Velvet Underground, 1969
- Murder Mysteries, a short story by Neil Gaiman

== See also ==
- Murder mystery game, a party game
- Mystery dinner, a type of dinner theater
- Murder, Mystery and My Family, a 2018–2021 British television series
- Miss Fisher's Murder Mysteries, an Australian television series
- Murder Mystery 2 (formerly Murder Mystery), a popular Roblox experience revolving around the general concept
