= I Don't Need Your Love (disambiguation) =

"I Don't Need Your Love" is a 2018 song by Bleona.

I Don't Need Your Love, Don't Need Your Love, Don't Need Love or variants may also refer to:

== I Don't Need Your Love ==
- "I Don't Need Your Love", from the musical Six (musical)
- "I Don't Need Your Love Anymore", 1963 song by Dobby Dobson
  - "I Don't Need Your Love Anymore", 2001 cover by The Specials from the album Conquering Ruler
- "I Don't Need Your Love", 1964 song by The Wailers
- "I Don't Need Your Love", 1974 song by Fancy (band)
- "I Don't Need Your Love", 1977 song by Skrewdriver from the album All Skrewed Up
- "I Don't Need Your Love", 1982 song by The Sequence
- "I Don't Need Your Love Now", 1984 song by The Mood
- "I Don't Need Your Love", 1987 song by Jerry Calliste Jr. (also known as Hashim)
- "I Don't Need Your Love", 1986 song by Grave Digger from Stronger Than Ever (album)
- "I Don't Need Your Love", 2004 song by Aereogramme from Seclusion (Aereogramme album)
- "I Don't Need Your Love Song", 2009 song by Sarah Dawn Finer from Moving On (Sarah Dawn Finer album)
- I Don't Need Your Love, an album by Clones of Clones
  - "I Don't Need Your Love", 2014 title track song from that album
- "I Don't Need Your Love", 2014 song by Brody Dalle from the album Diploid Love

== Don't Need Your Love ==
- "Don't Need Your Love", 2005 song by The Game from the album The Documentary
- "Don't Need Your Love", 2018 song by Ash from Islands (Ash album)
- "Don't Need Your Love", 2019 song by Hrvy and NCT Dream

== Don't Need Love ==
- "Don't Need Love" (Johnny Diesel and the Injectors song), 1988 song and debut single by Australian rock group, Johnny Diesel and the Injectors
- "Don't Need Love", 2015 song by Katharine McPhee from her album Hysteria
- "Don't Need Love" (220 Kid and Gracey song), 2020 single by 220 Kid and Gracey
