= Middle distance =

Middle distance may refer to:

- Middle-distance running, the act of running over a distance of between 800 and 3000 metres
- Middle-distance swimming, the act of swimming over a distance between 200 and 800 metres
- Middle-distance triathlon, a triathlon longer than sprint, but shorter than ironman distances (e.g. Olympic triathlon distance)
- Middle-distance horse racing, horse flat races over a distance between 9.5 and 12.99 furlongs (or 1900 to 2599 metres)
- Middle-distance orienteering, orienteering races with finish times in the region of half an hour
- Middle-distance iron, a golfing term for mid-range iron golf clubs
- The area between the foreground and background in an image or landscape painting
- The Middle Distance, a 2015 film

== See also ==
- Middle Distance Runner, an indie rock band from Washington, D.C.
- "Middledistancerunner", a song by English producer Chicane featuring Owl City lead singer Adam Young, 2010
- Mid-range
- Long distance (disambiguation)
