= Breaking Free =

Song from Disney's 2006 film High School Musical

Single by Zac Efron, Drew Seeley and Vanessa Hudgens

from the album High School Musical
- B-side: "Start of Something New"
- Released: June 8, 2006
- Recorded: 2005
- Genre: Pop
- Length: 3:27
- Label: Walt Disney
- Songwriter: Jamie Houston
- Producer: Jamie Houston

High School Musical singles chronology
"Breaking Free" (2006)	"Get'cha Head in the Game" (2006)

Zac Efron singles chronology
"Breaking Free" (2006)	"You Are the Music in Me" (2007)

Drew Seeley singles chronology
"Breaking Free" (2006)	"Get'cha Head in the Game" (2006)

Vanessa Hudgens singles chronology
"Breaking Free" (2006)	"Come Back to Me" (2006)

"Breaking Free" is a song from the Disney Channel Original Movie High School Musical. It also appears on the soundtrack of the same name. It is sung by Zac Efron, Drew Seeley and Vanessa Hudgens. It was also released as a single on June 8, 2006. On June 21, 2006, it was certified as a Gold single by the RIAA for sales of over 500,000.

== Context ==
While Troy Bolton and Gabriella Montez face prejudice from the basketball and scholastic teams, respectively, they both decide that they can pursue their secret dream of performing in a high school musical. The song is sung during the film's climax when Troy and Gabriella participate in callbacks in front of the entire student body. In-universe, the duet is written and composed by Kelsi Nielsen for the second act of the Twinkle Towne school musical.

== Composition ==
The song, performed at the film's climax, is a "chirpy slow-jam". It's written in the key of C minor in the beginning and then it modulates to D minor at the end of the song.

== Commercial performance ==
In its second week on the Billboard Hot 100, the single jumped from number 86 to number 4, the largest jump in the chart's history up to that point. "Breaking Free" was also the top-selling song of the week, reaching number one on the Digital Songs chart. The single went platinum.

== Music video ==
As the climax of the film, "Breaking Free" was not released to any video countdowns in the US. In Germany, a music video was created for a remix of the song using behind-the-scenes footage, and was later included on the High School Musical Remix Edition DVD. In 2020, Disney+ added the original scene to their library, labelling it a music video.

== Cover versions ==
British pop-duo Same Difference included a studio version of the song on their debut album, Pop.

American rock group The Faded covered a version of "Breaking Free" for the High School Musical Goes Punk compilation on Skunk-Ape Records, even making a music video on YouTube.

The rock band Porter Block also recorded a cover for the Ending Room Recordings cover compilation Guilt by Association Vol. 1.

It was also covered by English teenager Skyla in June 2009.

Joshua Bassett and Olivia Rodrigo performed a cover for the season one finale of High School Musical: The Musical: The Series. The song was also on the show's soundtrack.

== Track listings ==
US and UK single

1. "Breaking Free"
2. "Start of Something New"

Italian single

1. "Breaking Free"
1. "Start of Something New"
2. "Se Provi a Volare" (Performed by Luca Dirisio)

Mexican single

1. "Eres Tú" (Performed by Belanova)

Portuguese single

1. "Breaking Free"
2. "O Que Eu Procurava" (Performed by Ludov)
3. "Só Tem Que Tentar"

French single

1. "Breaking Free"

European single

1. "Breaking Free"
2. "Breaking Free" (Instrumental)
3. "Breaking Free" (Remix)

Asian single

1. "Breaking Free" (Performed by Vince Chong, Nikki Gil, and Alicia Pan)

Chinese single

1. "Breaking Free (Mandarin Version)"

== Charts ==
=== Weekly charts ===
Chart (2006–2007)	Peak position
Australia (ARIA)	13
Germany (GfK)	46
Ireland (IRMA)	17
Italy (FIMI)	17
Netherlands (Single Top 100)	36
New Zealand (Recorded Music NZ)	4
Scottish Singles Sales (Official Charts)	6
UK Singles (Official Charts)	9
US Billboard Hot 100	4
US Pop 100 (Billboard)	6

=== Year-end charts ===
Chart (2006)	Position
Australia (ARIA)	95
New Zealand (Recorded Music NZ)	14

== Certifications ==
Region	Certification	Certified units/sales
Denmark (IFPI Danmark)	Gold	45,000^{‡}
Germany (BVMI)	Gold	150,000^{‡}
New Zealand (RMNZ)	Gold	15,000^{‡}
United Kingdom (BPI)	Platinum	600,000^{‡}
United States (RIAA)	Platinum	1,000,000^{‡}
^{‡} Sales+streaming figures based on certification alone.
