= Elk City (band) =

Art rock band

- Origin: New York City, New York, United States
- Genre: Art pop
- Years active: 1997–present
- Labels: Magic Door Record Label, Bar/None Records, Friendly Fire Recordings, Talitres, Hidden Agenda Records, Starrysky, Earworm Records, Warm Records,
- Spinoff of: Melting Hopefuls
- Members: Renee LoBue; Ray Ketchem; Sean Eden; Richard Baluyut; Chris Robertson
- Past members: Barbara Endes; Carl Baggaley; Martin Olson; Peter Langland-Hassan

Elk City is an American art-pop band from New York and New Jersey formed in 1997 as a spin-off of Melting Hopefuls. The original lineup consisted of Renee LoBue, Ray Ketchem and Peter Langland-Hassan.

The band released two albums, Status and Hold Tight the Ropes, in 2000 and 2002, respectively. After the second album, Langland-Hassan left the band, which led to the inclusion of Sean Eden and Barbara Endes.

They released New Believers in 2007 under the new lineup, and it was followed by House of Tongues in 2010.

In 2018 Elk City signed with Bar/None Records and released "Everybody's Insecure" and the adjoining EP, Souls in Space, before shuffling their line-up again for 2020.

== History ==
The band was formed after Langland-Hassan auditioned for Melting Hopefuls, a band that Ketchem and LoBue had been part of since 1990. The trio decided to have a fresh start with a new name for the band, rather than pretend that they were still the old one.

The name refers to Elk City, an unincorporated community in Barbour County, West Virginia. Ketchem, a West Virginia native, drove past the town's sign one day, and he thought it would make a good name. LoBue later commented that they liked that the name combined a rural element (an elk) with an urban element (a city).

When they started, the band's only instruments were an electric guitar and drums, played by Langland-Hassan and Ketchem, respectively, while LoBue and Langland-Hassan shared the lead vocals, but shortly after LoBue started playing bass on a Novation Bass Station analog synthesizer. They spent the next three years playing on small venues, working on developing their sound as they traveled together.

In 1999, the band released an extended play, Dreams of Steam, with Starrysky Records.

In early 2000, they changed the Bass Station for a Fender Rhodes Piano Bass, and later that year the band released their first full-length album, Status. It was released by Hidden Agenda Records (now Parasol Records) in the United States, and by Talitres in Europe in 2001.

In November of that same year, London-based label Earworm Records released "Freeze Two Over Eight", one of the songs from Status, as a 7" single. The single featured the song "Judori" as a B-side, which is not included in any of their studio albums. The band had performed "Judori" at the late-1999 wedding of two of Langland-Hassan's friends, Jude and Midori.

In 2000, Parasol Records included the band in volumes 1 and 2 of their Parasol's Sweet Sixteen series, with the songs "Dream of Steam" and "Love's Like a Bomb", respectively, as well as in Parasol Presents Christmas Singles with the song "Deer Crossing".

In 2001, soon after the release of Status in Europe, the band played on Black Sessions, a French radio show hosted by Bernard Lenoir, and that was followed by a two-week tour in Europe. Also that year, one of their songs, "Three Ears", was included in This Is Next Year: A Brooklyn-Based Compilation, released by Arena Rock, while "Love's Like a Bomb", from Status, was included in Journey to End of Twilight: US Pop Life Vol. 9 – North East, a compilation album released by Japanese label Contact Records.

After their return to the U.S., the band signed a deal with Warm Records to release their next two recordings: an EP, The Sea Is Fierce, released on October 23, 2001, and their second studio album, Hold Tight the Ropes, released on May 7, 2002, by Warm Records in the U.S., and by Talitres Records in Europe that same month.

During 2002, the band kept touring in the U.S., and near the end of the year they went on a tour in Europe that included shows in France, Greece, Italy and Spain. While on the tour they opened for American dream-pop/indie-pop band Luna on their presentations in Barcelona and Madrid, Spain, as part of their own European tour.

In February 2003, "Summer Song" was included in Flak Magazine's compilation album Got No Songs on the Radio: The Best Music of 2002. The album takes its name from a lyric in Elk City's song.

Langland-Hassan left the band after the release of the second album. LoBue and Ketchem continued playing as Elk City, with LoBue taking charge of performing all the vocals.

In 2005, Sean Eden, ex-guitarist of Luna, and Barbara Endes, ex-bassist of The Lovelies, joined the band.

On April 17, 2007, their third album, New Believers, was released by Friendly Fire Recordings, and that was followed by House of Tongues, released on June 1, 2010, by the same label; House of Tongues features Carl Baggaley on keyboards as part of the band.

The band has participated on several tribute albums released by American Laundromat Records. They have covered:

- "Monkey Gone to Heaven" for Dig for Fire: A Tribute to Pixies, released on November 13, 2007.
- "Helpless" for Cinnamon Girl: Women Artists Cover Neil Young for Charity, released on February 12, 2008.
- "Close to Me" for Just Like Heaven: A Tribute to The Cure, released on January 27, 2009.
- "I Know It's Over" for Please, Please, Please: A Tribute to The Smiths, released on December 13, 2011.

On November 15, 2011, the band added a cover of Helix's "Heavy Metal Love" to a compilation album released by Engine Room Recordings entitled Guilt by Association Vol. 3.

== Discography ==
=== Albums ===
- 2000 – Status
- 2002 – Hold Tight the Ropes
- 2007 – New Believers
- 2010 – House of Tongues
- 2018 – Everybody's Insecure

=== Extended plays ===
- 1999 – Dreams of Steam
- 2001 – The Sea Is Fierce
- 2019 – Souls In Space

=== Collaborations ===
- 2007 – Dig for Fire: A Tribute to Pixies – "Monkey Gone to Heaven"
- 2008 – Cinnamon Girl: Women Artists Cover Neil Young for Charity – "Helpless"
- 2008 – A Few Uneven Rhymes: A Tribute To Winter Hours – "Incendiary"
- 2009 – Just Like Heaven: A Tribute to the Cure – "Close to Me"
- 2010 – Please, Please, Please: A Tribute to The Smiths – "I Know It's Over"
- 2011 – Guilt by Association Vol. 3 – "Heavy Metal Love" (Helix cover)

== See also ==
- List of bands formed in New York
- Music of New York City
