= Abby Lakew =

Ethiopian singer

- Born: Gondar, Ethiopia
- Origin: Addis Ababa, Ethiopia
- Genres: Ethiopian music; R&B; pop
- Occupations: Singer; actress
- Instruments: Vocals
- Years active: 2005–present
- Label: Nahom Records

Abby Lakew is an Ethiopian singer from Gondar. She became popular after releasing "Manale" in 2005. Abiy sings in Amharic and English.

== Early life and career ==
Lakew was born in Gondar, Ethiopia. She moved to the United States when she was 13, and went to high school in Dallas, Texas.

In 2005, Lakew released her debut studio album, Manale. The song of the same title incorporated with R&B element. Manale was produced in two languages, Amharic and English, in New York Studio. The album development cost US$40,000.

Lakew is also known for her work in traditional films. She was in the 2012 film, Eyerus, portraying a woman who struggles with her country life and moves to an urban area for adjustment.

"Shikorina" was released in 2012 followed by "Endemiwedeh" and "Abrerew" in 2014. On 16 June 2015, Lakew released her successful hit "Yene Habesha", it has viewed over 54 million viewers on YouTube by May 2021. The development and release delayed due to the death of her elder sister which led Lakew to foster her nephews in addition to raising her biological son. In 2017, Lakew released her sophomore album Yene Habesha.

At the 2016 Kora All-Africa Music Awards, Lakew was nominated for Best Traditional Female Artist for Africa.

Her song "Guragew" was released on 26 September 2018. On 10 September 2020, Lakew released "Messay". The music video reached over 915,000 viewers on YouTube as of 28 September, surpassing her 2015 single "Yene Habesha".

== Philanthropy ==
On 14 October 2017, Lakew announced she would be donating profits from her album to Mekedonia, a charitable organization that funds the elderly and disabled people. Lakew told The Reporter that:

After visiting various non-governmental organizations while in Addis Ababa to take part in “Addis Ababa Concert 2” which was held last year, I decided to donate all proceeds from the CD sales of my new album to Mekedonia.

== Discography ==
- Manale (2005)
- Yene Habesha (2017)
- Messay (2020)
- Gondere Wa (2022)
- Zendro Base ( 2024)
