= War Music (Slim the Mobster album) =

Mixtape by Slim the Mobster
- Released: November 9, 2011
- Recorded: 2010–2011
- Genre: West coast hip hop; gangsta rap
- Length: 33:38
- Label: Gang Module; Aftermath
- Producer: Sha Money XL (also exec.); Rahki; Seige Monstracity; Bink!; DJ Silk; Choc; Dr. Dre; Jake One; Sid Roams; Key Kat Productions; Boi-1da; Vitamin D; Vikaden; Lab Ratz

Slim the Mobster chronology
War Music (2011)	S.O.O.N. (Something Out Of Nothing) (TBA)

Singles from War Music
- 1. "Gun Play" Released: September 6, 2011; 2. "Work For It (Price On Ya Head)" Released: September 20, 2011; 3. "What Goes Up" Released: October 5, 2011

War Music is a mixtape by American rapper Slim the Mobster, hosted by DJ Whoo Kid. The album is Slim's debut on Aftermath Entertainment with Gang Module, released on November 9, 2011. It was originally due out on the 25 October. On 7 November, Slim confirmed it had been pushed back an extra day so that Dr. Dre could finish mastering the song he featured on. Guest features include Dr. Dre, Snoop Dogg, Kendrick Lamar, Prodigy of Mobb Deep, Yummy Bingham, Nikki Grier, Sly, and D. Brown. Production was handled by Dr. Dre, Jake One, Sha Money XL, Bink!, Boi-1da, Rahki, and others. It was hosted by DJ Whoo Kid, and mastered by Mark B. Christensen.

Slim released the singles and accompanying videos to "Gun Play" and "Work For It (Price On Ya Head)" onto his official YouTube channel on the 6 September and 20 September. Followed by the upload of Doom Freestyle. He later released "What Goes Up" onto his official Facebook page on October 5. DJ Whoo Kid previewed the Dr. Dre featured track "Back Against The Wall" on Shade 45 on 6 November.

== Track listing ==
No.	Title	Producer(s)	Length
1.	"Dreaming" (featuring Nikki Grier)	Rahki	2:54
2.	"What Goes Up" (featuring Snoop Dogg)	Seige Monstracity	2:30
3.	"Fuck You" (featuring Yummy Bingham)	Bink!	4:01
4.	"Falling Star" (featuring Nikki Grier and Sly)	DJ Silk; Choc	3:12
5.	"Back Against the Wall" (featuring Dr. Dre and Sly)	Jake One; Dr. Dre	3:51
6.	"Martyr" (featuring Prodigy of Mobb Deep)	Sid Roams	2:49
7.	"South Central Blues" (featuring D. Brown)	Sha Money XL; Key Kat Productions	2:42
8.	"Whose House?" (featuring Kendrick Lamar)	Boi-1da	3:29
9.	"See It"	Vitamin D	2:52
10.	"Gun Play"	Sha Money XL; Vikaden	3:41
11.	"Take It Easy"	Lab Ratz	1:37

Original production

- "Dreaming" takes its instrumental from "50's My Favorite" as performed by 50 Cent.
- "Back Against the Wall" contains a sample from "Salute" as performed by T.I.
- "Whose House?" contains a sample from "My House" as performed by Big Sean.

== Personnel ==
- Executive producers: Sha Money XL
- A&R: Brandon "Villa Nova" Lamela
- Marketing: Cashmere Agency
- Photo: Travis Shinn
- Styling: Kieu Couture
- Video & Art Design: Efrain "Eif" Rivera for ERG Designs
- Hosted by DJ Whoo Kid
- Recorded by Charlie Red
- Mixed by Pat Viala
- Mastered by Mark B. Christensen
