= Drew Parks =

American rapper

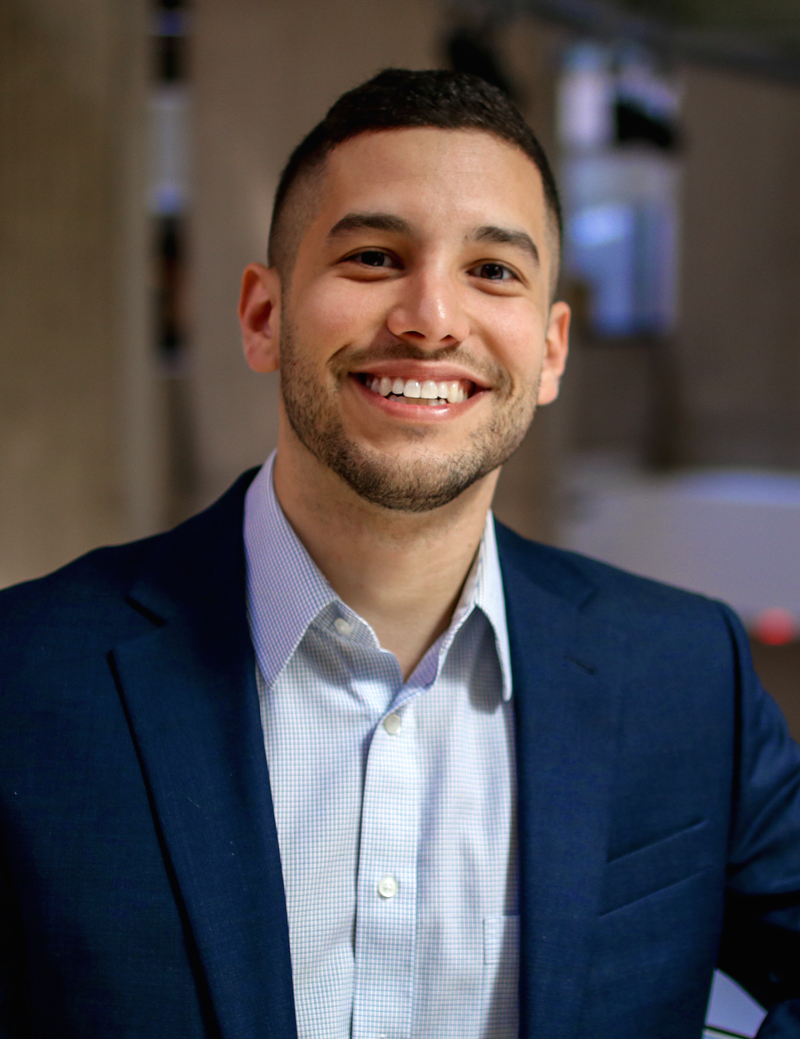
- Parks in Detroit in July 2019

Background information
- Also known as: Drew32
- Born: Andrew Michael Parks; December 3, 1991 (age 34); Royal Oak, Michigan, U.S.
- Genres: Hip hop
- Occupations: Rapper; songwriter; record producer
- Years active: 2001–2016
- Label: Quarter to Infinity Entertainment
- Website: www.drewparks.com

Andrew Michael Parks (born December 3, 1991) is a former American rapper, record producer, and songwriter from Metro Detroit, Michigan. Parks first gained national recognition for his music career in the early 2010s, when his music was featured on networks and music publications such as MTV, ESPN, Freeform, BBC 1Xtra, XXL Mag, Shade 45, Billboard Magazine, and Vibe Magazine.

== Early life and education ==
Parks was born on December 3, 1991, in Royal Oak, Michigan and grew up living in Troy, Michigan. He attended Avondale School District and graduated from Avondale High School in Auburn Hills, Michigan. After high school, Parks attended Oakland University, where he received a Bachelor of Science degree in marketing. In 2019, he enrolled at University of Michigan Law School and is currently studying to get a Juris Doctor degree.

Parks' parents are both of Greek descent, and he is a member of St. Nicholas Greek Orthodox Church in Troy, Michigan.

== Music career ==
Parks began his musical career at age 10, under the moniker Drew32. He later released music under the name Drew Parks. He writes, produces, and records nearly all of his songs himself. His music began to gain recognition in 2011, when he performed in the Fender Lodge at the 2011 Sundance Film Festival in Park City, Utah, and in Austin, Texas at the 2011 SXSW Music Conference.

In October 2011, Parks performed as the opening act on J. Cole's Cole World Tour at the Royal Oak Music Theatre, and in March 2012, Parks was one of 18 US artists selected by Billboard magazine to compete in the 2012 Billboard Music Awards Battle of the Bands competition.

In April 2012, Parks performed as the opening act at Grizzlypalooza, the spring concert event at Oakland University, which also featured performances by Gym Class Heroes, Kirko Bangz, and New Boyz. He released a mixtape in April 2012 entitled Label Me (hosted by DJ Skee), which featured collaborations with Jon Connor, Royce Da 5'9", Shorty da Prince, and Slim the Mobster. The lead single from Label Me, "I Am King," received airplay on Sirius XM station Shade 45, and its music video aired on MTVU. Television network ESPN included several of Parks' songs on its sports debate TV show, First Take throughout 2012 and 2013.

In August 2013, Parks performed as an opening act for Kendrick Lamar at The Fillmore Detroit as a part of Bud Light's 50|50|1 concert series.

In June 2014, BBC Radio 1Xtra selected 32 hip-hop artists worldwide to represent each of their relative countries by performing a freestyle video for 1Xtra's coverage of the 2014 FIFA World Cup in Brazil. Parks was chosen to represent Greece, and his World Cup Freestyle was featured on BBC Radio 1Xtra throughout June and July 2014. Later that year, Parks performed alongside DJ Head at the official Eminem and Rihanna Monster Tour After Party at The Fillmore Detroit.

In August 2016, he performed alongside Fat Joe and Nelly at WSNX-FM's "Party in the Park" concert in Grand Rapids, Michigan

Television network Freeform (formerly ABC Family) included Parks' song, "We Ain't Stoppin" in episodes of its shows Pretty Little Liars, Famous in Love, and The Fosters

In 2017, Detroit Pistons Center Andre Drummond collaborated with Drew Parks on two songs, "Lit," and "Nu Vibe," which were later released on Andre Drummond's 2018 debut music album entitled Fyi.

Parks is no longer actively making music. His last official release was his 2016 album, Away We Go, which featured the single "We Love Them," a collaboration with Fatman Scoop.

== Selected discography ==
Albums

- 2006: Awakening
- 2016: Away We Go EP

Mixtapes

- 2007: Awakening Vol. 2 Mixtape
- 2009: Quarter Till Infinity Mixtape (Hosted by DJ Mo Beatz)
- 2009: Twittermania Mixtape (Hosted by DJ Mo Beatz)
- 2009: Who is Drew32? Vol. 1 Mixtape
- 2010: Take the World: Who is Drew32? Vol. 2 Mixtape (Hosted by DJ Pauly D)
- 2010: Sunrise on Your Dreams Mixtape
- 2011: The B.U.R.N. Project
- 2011: Labeled SXSW Sampler (prelude to "Label Me")
- 2012: Label Me (Hosted by DJ Skee)
- 2013: The Batch
