= Long distance =

Long distance or Long-distance may refer to:

- Long-distance calling
- Long-distance operator
- Long-distance relationship
- Long-distance train
- Long-distance anchor pylon, see dead-end tower

== Footpaths ==
- Long-distance trail
- European long-distance paths
- Long Distance Routes, official term for footpaths in Scotland
- List of long-distance footpaths
- Long-distance footpaths in the United Kingdom
- Long-distance trails in the United States
- Long-distance trails in the Republic of Ireland

== Arts and media ==
- Long Distance (Ivy album), 2000
- Long Distance (Runrig album), 1996
- "Long Distance" (Brandy song), a 2008 song by Brandy Norwood
- Long Distance (G.E.M. song), 2015
- "Long Distance", a 2012 song by Melanie Amaro
- "Long Distance", by 8stops7 from the album Birth of a Cynic, 1998
- "Long Distance" (The General Motors Hour), a 1961 Australian television film
- Long Distance (2019 film), a Peruvian comedy-drama film
- Long Distance (2024 film), an American science fiction film
- Long Distance, a 2015 IDW Publishing comics series

== Sports ==
- Long-distance riding
- Long-distance running
- Long-distance swimming

== See also ==
- "Long Distance Call", an episode of The Twilight Zone
- Long Distance Calling (band), a German band
- Long Distance Voyager, a 1981 album by Moodyblues
- "Long D", a 2022 song by Jace Chan
- Middle distance (disambiguation)
