= The Last Classed Blast =

Studio album by Dufus
- Released: October 16, 2006
- Genre: Antifolk
- Label: ROIR

Dufus chronology
Ball of Design (2004)	The Last Classed Blast (2006)

Professional ratings
Review scores
Source	Rating
Allmusic	Not rated

The Last Classed Blast is a 2006 album by American band Dufus released on October 16.

== Track listing ==
1. "Dawn Crusade"
2. "Babylon Com"
3. "Tutu"
4. "Innabarabie"
5. "Dissassemblement Hymn"
6. "Exponential"
7. "Heaven Is Waiting"
8. "Balloon Rocking Chair"
9. "War Is Over"
10. "Right On"
11. "Nenglich Phlarloosely"
12. "You Weren’t Ready"
13. "Sacred Charney"
14. "On and On"
15. "Lay Down Flat"
16. "Try More Patiently"
