= Clones of Clones =

Indie rock band from Washington D.C., United states of America

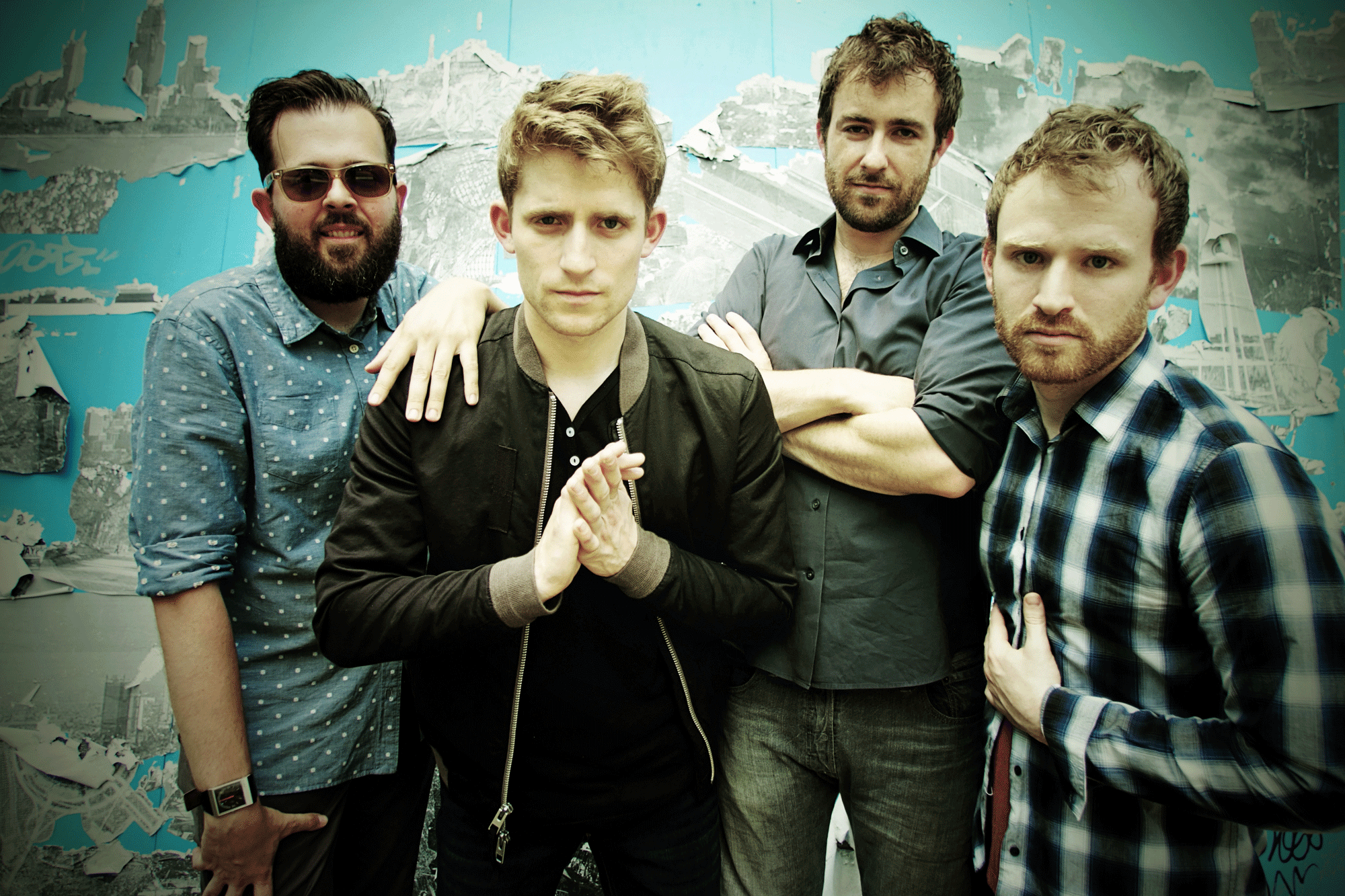

Background information
- Origin: Washington, D.C.
- Genres: Indie rock
- Years active: 2012–present
- Spinoff of: The Blue Line
- Members: Ben Payes; Todd Evans; Nick Scialli; Brian Abbott
- Past members: Dave Chaletzky
- Website: clonesofclones.com

Clones of Clones is an American indie rock band from Washington, D.C. composed of members Ben Payes, Todd Evans, Nick Scialli, and Brian Abbott. On their debut EP, the band worked with producer Justin Long (U.S. Royalty). They have played shows alongside bands such as Sam Roberts Band, The Trews, SomeKindaWonderful, and Saintseneca.

== History ==
=== Formation and influences ===
In the summer of 2012, after their former band The Blue Line dissolved, Payes, Scialli, and then-guitarist Dave Chaletzky recruited drummer Brian Abbott to start a new musical project. The name "Clones of Clones" was conceived as an ironic play on words; Payes has stated that they have always strived for "uniqueness with a hint of familiarity." The band recorded the "Neighborhoods" EP and began playing shows to support its release.

In early 2013, Chaletzky left the band and was replaced by Todd Evans of Florida's A New Way To Live Forever, completing the current line-up.

=== Name meaning ===
The band name Clones of Clones was conceived as a way of expressing frustration with the artistic cycle of copying and reproducing pre-existing ideas at the expense of risk-taking novelty. According to Payes, "Nothing is completely original...I’m not sure things have been original for awhile. I envision a clone to be a less perfect version of its former self.”

=== "Neighborhoods" EP (2013) ===
Shortly after forming in Summer 2012, Clones of Clones recorded the "Neighborhoods" EP with Justin Long (U.S. Royalty) in Potomac, MD. The EP was released in early 2013 with the following track listing:

1. The Neighborhood
2. Bully
3. Homie
4. Take Care of Yourself

=== "Mr. Sanity" single (2013) ===
The band continued its work with Justin Long in 2013, recording the single "Mr. Sanity." This was the first material recorded with Evans in the band.

=== I Don't Need Your Love (2014) ===
The title track "I Don't Need Your Love" was released along with "Out Loud" and "The Battle Between" on November 11, 2014.

== Band members ==
- Ben Payes - Guitar, synth, vocals
- Todd Evans - Guitar, synth, vocals
- Nick Scialli - Bass, guitar, vocals
- Brian Abbott - Drums

=== Former members ===
- Dave Chaletzky - Guitar, vocals

== Discography ==
- "Neighborhoods" EP (2013)
- "Mr. Sanity" Single (2013)
- "I Don't Need Your Love" Single (2014)
- "Monster Heart" Album (2015)
- “That Wasn’t Me” EP (2017)

== Singles ==
Date of Release	Song	Album
February 19, 2013	The Neighborhood	"Neighborhoods" EP
October 29, 2013	Mr. Sanity	"Mr. Sanity" Single
October 16, 2014	I Don't Need Your Love	I Don't Need Your Love

== Notable performances ==
Since releasing their "Neighborhoods" EP, Clones of Clones has toured in Washington, D.C. and nearby mid-atlantic states. The band has played four shows in Washington, D.C. opening for nationally and internationally touring acts.

Date	Venue	Other Acts
July 10, 2014	DC9 Nightclub	SomeKindaWonderful
June 15, 2014	DC9 Nightclub	The Trews
February 22, 2014	Rock N Roll Hotel	Sam Roberts Band
October 16, 2013	DC9 Nightclub	Saintseneca
