= Porter Block =

American power pop band

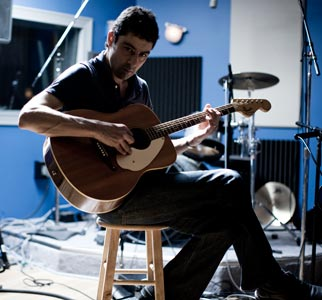
- Porter Block frontman Peter Block in his recording studio. (Photo by Noah Kalina)

Background information
- Origin: New York City, United States
- Genres: Alternative rock, Indie rock
- Years active: 2003–present
- Label: Team Mensch

Porter Block is an American, New York-based power pop band, formed by Peter Block and Caleb Sherman. Since 2006, the band has released five albums and one EP, including several collaborations with Mike Viola.

== History ==
Porter Block formed in the early 2000s. Peter Block met Caleb Sherman in 2003 while playing in the band Tripasaurus vs. Blockhead. During recording sessions at the Engine Room Audio in New York City, Block and Sherman formed Porter Block. The group's influences drew from 1960s British Invasion bands to ‘70s acts such as Neil Young and The Eagles.

Porter Block's debut album, Suburban Sprawl, was released in 2006 by Engine Room Recordings, a label founded by Block and Engine Room Audio owner Mark Christensen. All Music Guide wrote, "Buoyant pop tunes filled with harmonies and hooks … a promising start."

In 2007, the band released the Solitary Hotel EP and contributed two songs to the first volume of the Guilt By Association covers compilation series. In 2008, Porter Block released their second full-length album, Off Our Shoulders. PopMatters called it "a pleasantly infectious 36-minute spread of over 10 catchy pop missives that wash over you like a cool summer breeze without ever outstaying their welcome."

The band's third full-length, Pueblo A Go Go, was released in February 2009. It was self-produced by Block, with Sherman adding performance and mixing credits. Steve Holley, whose resume includes Paul McCartney, Elton John, and Ian Hunter's Rant Band, guested on drums. Guitarist Garrett Alarcon lent a hand both in the studio and on the live dates that followed with Mike Doughty.

Touring partners from 2006 to 2009 included Deep Blue Something, Mike Viola, The Samples, and Mike Doughty.

When Sherman moved his studio to Nashville in 2009, Block reached out to 11 songwriters he admired, some he had never met, and invited them to his studio near the Gowanus Canal in Brooklyn. The songwriting group included Terry Radigan, Casey Shea, Jeff Jacobson, and Angela McCluskey. The resulting album was called The Gowanus Yacht Club, released August 2009. Short And Sweet NYC called it, "A fine blend of well-crafted songs that is a summation of a rather interesting songwriting ‘experiment’."

In 2010, Porter Block released Peter Block, a solo-centric album dealing with subjects of illness and divorce. Mike Viola produced, played on and co-wrote the album, which also featured collaborations with Tracy Bonham, Dan Miller of They Might Be Giants, Michael Flynn of Slow Runner, and Aaron Lee Tasjan. Edge Media remarked, "Want something that will have you bobbing your head instantly? Peter Block's self-titled fifth album will do it for you."

In April 2010, Peter was diagnosed with a neurological viral condition called Parsonage-Turner Syndrome, which partially-paralyzed his arms and hands. After recovering, Block helped create the non-profit Music and Medicine Program at Weill Cornell Medical College, which encourages its students to continue pursuing music courses and performance while studying medicine.

Porter Block will release a new LP, Hard To See Beautiful, on August 8, 2016. Sherman's credits include co-producer, co-writer, vocalist and player. Mike Viola contributed as co-producer, co-writer, acoustic guitarist and backup vocalist on three songs. Hard To See Beautiful was recorded digitally at Sherman's Cygnus Sound studio in Nashville, Tennessee and analog at The Carriage House in Los Angeles, by studio owner/ace engineer and producer, Sheldon Gomberg (Ben Harper, Warpaint, Joseph Arthur). Guitars were performed by Block, Sherman, Viola, Steven Elliot (Dawes, Norah Jones) and Terry Radigan. Keyboard duties were split between Block, Sherman, and Larry Goldings (James Taylor, John Mayer). Drums were done by Brandon Barnes and longtime Elvis Costello collaborator, Pete Thomas. Bass tracks were handled by Sherman and another Costello bandmate, Davey Faragher. A song recorded during the Hard To See Beautiful sessions, a cover of The Kinks’ “Dead End Street,” was released in July 2016.

Hard To See Beautiful was released by Team Mensch, a brand new label started by Peter and fellow music enthusiast, Darren Paltrowitz. Tour dates in support of the album were performed alongside Lucy Woodward and Tim Easton.

== Discography ==
=== Albums ===
- Suburban Sprawl (Engine Room Recordings, 2006)
- Off Our Shoulders (Engine Room Recordings, 2008)
- Pueblo A Go Go (Engine Room Recordings, 2009)
- Gowanus Yacht Club (Engine Room Recordings, 2009)
- Peter Block (Engine Room Recordings, 2010)
- Hard To See Beautiful (Team Mensch, 2016)
- Clean up the Living Room (2021)

=== EPs ===
- Solitary Hotel (Engine Room Recordings, 2007)

=== Compilations ===
- Guilt by Association Vol. 1 (Engine Room Recordings, 2007) Song: "Breaking Free" (High School Musical cover)
- Guilt by Association Vol. 2 (Engine Room Recordings, 2008) Song: "Careless Whisper" (Wham! cover)
- Guilt by Association Vol. 4 (Team Mensch, 2016) Song: "Dead End Street" (The Kinks cover)
