= Murder Mystery (band) =

American indie rock band

- Origin: Mount Pleasant, Michigan, United States
- Genres: Indie rock, College rock, Lo-fi
- Years active: 1999-present
- Labels: DetroitSounds Records; Workerbee Records
- Members: Dennis O'Malley; Adam LeRoy; Ken Kochajda

Murder Mystery is an American indie rock band from Detroit, Michigan. The group started in the college town of Mount Pleasant, Michigan in 1999 but moved to Detroit in 2003, attracted by the burgeoning music scene of that city . The group earned notoriety in a scene that was still largely dominated by garage rock and garnered airplay on college stations like WMUC and WDET.

Also denoted as college-rock, the group signed with DetroitSounds Records and released a self-titled EP in 2005. Largely influenced by indie-rock bands Sleater-Kinney, Butterglory, and Built to Spill, the EP was released to positive reviews at home and mixed reviews abroad. Shortly after the release of the record the group split with DetroitSounds and recorded material for a documentary on Detroit pianist Bob Seeley while touring parts of the Midwest and the East Coast and recording material for a follow-up EP.

The follow-up EP entitled, "Big Rocket Go Now" was released in 2007 at the Royal Oak Music Theater in Royal Oak, MI. In 2009 the group signed to Workerbee Records , based in Ames, Iowa.

Most recently Murder Mystery have contributed a cover song to Guilt by Association, a compilation album released by Engine Room Recordings. On the album, the band added a cover of Def Leppards "Photograph".

== Band members ==
- Dennis O'Malley - Drums
- Ken Kochajda - Bass/Vocals
- Adam LeRoy - Guitar/Vocals

== Discography ==
- 2006 - "Murder Mystery"
- 2007 - "Big Rockets Go Now!"
- 2007 - "Are You Ready For The Heartache Cause Here It Comes"
- 2008 - "Live on WDET"
- 2008 - "Shrine of the Little Flower" (EP)
- 2009 - "Owl"

=== Compilations ===
- 2011 - "Guilt by Association Vol. 3". "Photograph" (Def Leppard cover).

== See also ==
- Indie rock
- Lo-fi music
- List of Lo-fi bands
