= Tiger Shadow =

English alternative hip hop band

- Origin: Leeds, England
- Genres: Alternative hip hop, electronica, jazz
- Years active: 2008–present
- Label: Tiger Shadow Music (independent)
- Members: Komla MC; Jim Tycho
- Website: http://www.tigershadow.com/

Tiger Shadow are an English alternative hip hop band from Leeds, composed of Jim Tycho (synthesizers, bass, guitar, backing vocals, orchestration) and Komla MC (lyrics, lead vocals, drum programming & percussion). They have also performed live with singer Lynsey Cawthra, guitarists Ser Nik and Dave Pearson, as well as drummers and percussionists Sheikh Sticks and Karim Nashar.

Komla was born in Ghana where he spent most of his childhood, and moved to England in his teenage years. Jim Tycho is originally from Southport (near Liverpool). They both met in Leeds in approximately 2001 while jamming with mutual friends and have continued to make music together ever since. The band officially formed in early 2008 and are described as a genre-crossing collective mixing electronica and jazz with hip hop, while also including elements of funk, reggae, trip hop, indie and world music.

== Formation ==
Tiger Shadow were formed in July 2008 after Jim & Komla had entered home recordings of "Terracotta Blues" and "Star Chaser" into a competition for Sandman magazine, which they won and this gave them their first gigs as a band at Reading & Leeds Festivals for BBC Introducing on 22 & 23 August 2008. Tiger Shadow did not exist as a band when the winning email was received, so Jim & Komla looked to musicians who they were working with at the time, and some with whom they had collaborated with for the previous 10 years, to form the first version of the band specifically to play at Reading & Leeds. Karim Nashar was drafted on drums / percussion; Dave Pearson on lead guitar; Kully Manik on guitar / bass and Lynsey Cawthra on vocals. Komla MC performed vox / drums / percussion and Jim Tycho completed this line-up on guitar / bass and programmed synths. Between 18 July and 22 August 2008, the band was formed and material was written / completed for performance at the festivals.

== The Rise of the Tiger Shadow ==
After the Leeds and Reading festivals were complete, Komla, Jim, Dave & Karim decided to record an album. September 2008 to January 2009 were spent writing and rehearsing new material. Between February and March 2009, The Rise of the Tiger Shadow was recorded at Cottage Road Studios in Headingley, Leeds by Matt Peel and Andy Hawkins. This was released through the band's own record label (Tiger Shadow Music) via AWAL, and became available on iTunes and a number of other electronic stores from 20 April 2009.

=== Track listing ===
1. W’Happen – 3:32
2. This Is the Future – 4:14
3. Vernacular Spectacular – 3:22
4. What Do You Know About It? – 4:48
5. Escape – 3:14
6. Narration – 2:58
7. Star Chaser – 3:58
8. Terracotta Blues – 3:48
9. Iron Filings – 3:52
10. That's Because It Is... - 3:32
11. Hold On Tightly – 4:56

== Stripe 1 EP ==
After the first album, the band decided to experiment with their sound and this resulted in the concept of a series of EPs which would be used as test-beds for different approaches to making their music, bringing out the numerous sonic aspects of the band. The first EP, Stripe 1, was recorded at Cottage Road Studios with producer Matt Peel in September 2009. This was released through the band's own record label (Tiger Shadow Music) via AWAL, and became available on iTunes and a number of other electronic stores from 2 November 2009. This EP marked a gradual move away from the rock / hip-hop combination of the first album, and started to see the introduction of a more electronic sound to the band, particularly via the use of the Korg Electribe EM-1.

=== Track listing ===
1. Up & Down – 3:34
2. I Knew You'd Be Alright – 3:06
3. See You Next Tuesday – 4:04

== Stripe 2 EP ==
Stripe 2 was recorded at Cottage Road Studios with producer Matt Peel in March 2010. This was released through the band's own record label, Tiger Shadow Music, via AWAL, and became available on iTunes and a number of other electronic stores from 28 June 2010 onwards. This EP was recorded by just Jim Tycho and Komla MC using programmed electronic drums and it marks the completion of the band's transition from Rock / Hip-Hop to Hip-Hop / Electronica. This was also the first recording to utilize live strings (courtesy of the cello playing of Emilia Ergin).

=== Track listing ===
1. Inner City – 3:50
2. Gambit – 2:55
3. Good Times – 6:36

== The Adventures of the Tiger Shadow ==
The Adventures of the Tiger Shadow was recorded at Cottage Road Studios with producer Matt Peel between January and April 2011 and was mastered by Mark B. Christensen at The Engine Room in New York between May 2011 and January 2012.

=== Track listing ===
1. Oh No, Overflow! – 5:28
2. Baxter's Revenge (Trap Digger) – 2:00
3. Don't Try This At Home – 1:47
4. Prepare Thyself – 2:11
5. Tried & Tested – 3:08
6. Red All Over – 2:10
7. Monsoon Too Soon – 2:11
8. Serene Trampoline (Petrichor) – 2:16
9. What Were They Thinking? – 4:28
10. Proof of Concept – 2:19
11. Standard Response – 2:47
12. Helter Swelter – 3:41
13. Locomotion – 2:45
14. Hippo Electric – 1:14
15. Don't Be Scared – 4:34
16. Bright & Gloomy – 3:15
17. Abject Happiness – 3:19
18. Imagine My Surprise – 3:37

== Discography ==
=== Studio albums ===
Year	Title
2009	The Rise of the Tiger Shadow: Released: 20 April 2009; Label: Tiger Shadow Music via AWAL
2009	Stripe 1 EP: Released: 2 November 2009; Label: Tiger Shadow Music via AWAL
2010	Stripe 2 EP: Released: 28 June 2010; Label: Tiger Shadow Music via AWAL
2012	The Adventures of the Tiger Shadow: Released: TBD; Label: TBD

=== Compilations ===
Year	Title
2010	Festival Harvest: Released: 1 June 2010; Label: Active Distribution Ltd.
2010	Busking for Solar Aid: Released: 11 July 2010; Label: Big Chill

=== Videos ===
Date	Title
August 2009	This Is the Future: Directed by: Sundeep Toor
September 2009	Vernacular Spectacular: Directed by: Bob Blunden
20 September 2009	Hold on Tightly: Live for BBC Raw Talent
November 2009	What Do You Know About It?: Directed by: Claire McArdle
25 November 2011	Interview & Abject Happiness: Live for 360 Club (Leeds)
25 November 2011	Tried & Tested: Live for 360 Club (Leeds)
