= Cassettes Won't Listen =

One-man music project

- Origin: Brooklyn, New York, U.S.
- Genre: electronic
- Years active: 2004–present
- Website: https://open.spotify.com/artist/2HO08wW2qAmDi0S5S3lT3D

Cassettes Won't Listen is the one-man project of producer Jason Drake, based out of Brooklyn, New York, United States. Cassettes Won't Listen has released multiple records, EPs and singles, garnering press worldwide and landing numerous syncs for television, film and video games. Cassettes Won't Listen has released official remixes for artists such as Aesop Rock, El-P, Midlake, Mr. Lif, Morcheeba.

Cassettes Won't Listen initial release was a covers EP entitled One Alternative on December 11, 2007, as well as a seven-song EP entitled Small-Time Machine on March 11, 2008. Drake self released Small-Time Machine through distributor, The Orchard, along with his 2009 instrumental record, Into The Hillside.

The track "Freeze & Explode" was used in the February 16, 2009, broadcast of the NBC show Chuck.

On December 3, 2009, Cassettes Won't Listen hosted MTV2's Subterranean, a show focused on independent music.

2010 saw a resurgence from the producer in terms of remixes under the Cassettes Won't Listen moniker, with remixes for Gold Panda, Daft Punk, The Death Set featuring Diplo, amongst others.

In April 2011, Cassettes Won't Listen announced the release date of his album, KEVINSPACEY, on Daylight Curfew, his founded lifestyle brand. On May 12 he was served with a cease and desist from actor Kevin Spacey and his legal team forcing him to change the name of his record. The "K" was dropped effectively renaming the record to EVINSPACEY. The record was released on June 21, 2011, via Daylight Curfew.

On August 14, 2012, Cassettes Won't Listen issued an essay detailing the process and inspiration behind the EP, titled Casa, and effectively putting the CWL project on hiatus (possibly indefinite) in order to focus on his project, Dfalt, and lifestyle brand, Daylight Curfew.

On February 14, 2024, CWL (aka Jason Drake), unveiled news of an upcoming single titled "The Flowers," representing the release of his first full-length record in a decade. Throughout this hiatus, Drake has been a impetus behind the evolution of his lifestyle brand, Daylight Curfew, where his creative direction has forged collaborations with others such as Adult Swim, Adventure Time, Sony, and the creators of beloved franchises like Rick and Morty, Samurai Jack, and Aqua Teen Hunger Force.

Drake has played a pivotal role as the brand manager for the hip hop duo, Run The Jewels, since their inception in 2013, shaping the group's marketing strategies and merchandising endeavors.

== Discography ==
=== LPs ===
- Small-Time Machine (2008)
- Into the Hillside (2009)
- EVINSPACEY (2011)
- CWL (2013)
- TBD (2024)

=== EPs ===
- Nobody's Moving (digital release) (2005)
- The Quiet Trial (digital release) (2006)
- One Alternative (Free Digital Release) (2007)
- Dfalt (digital release) (2011)
- Casa (digital release) (2012)

=== Singles ===
- The Sidewalk Cruise (digital release) (2006)
- The Flowers (2024)

=== Videos ===
- Where Did Go (2007)
- Paper Float (2008)
- Freeze and Explode (2008)
- Hmmmm (2009)
- Take Off (2009)
- Quickly Approaching (2009)
- Into The Hillside (2009)

=== Compilations ===
- "Need You Tonight" (INXS cover) from Guilt by Association Vol. 2 (2008)
- "Let's Go To Bed" (The Cure cover) from Just Like Heaven - a tribute to The Cure (2008)

=== Remixes ===
- Asobi Seksu - Strawberries (2006)
- The Postmarks - Goodbye (2006)
- RJD2 - De Lalouette (2006)
- Mr. Lif - Brothaz (2006)
- Pela - Lonesome Hearts (2006)
- Midlake - Young Brides (2006)
- Dr. Octagon - Aliens (2006)
- The Diggs - Everyones Starting Over (2006)
- Morcheeba - Everybody Loves a Loser (2006)
- Brookville - Nothing's Meant to Last (2006)
- El-P - Flyentology (2007)
- Aesop Rock - None Shall Pass (2007)
- Midlake - Roscoe (2007)
- The Dears - Demons (2009)
- Dappled Cities - The Price (2009)
- The Death Set - Around The World (2009)
- Mr. Lif - The Sun (feat. Cassettes Won't Listen) (2009)
- Christine - Cool Your Shoes (2009)
- The Faunts - Explain (2009)
- Bisc 1 - Turbulence (2009)
- Gold Panda - You (2010)
- Daft Punk - Derezzed (2010)
- Houses - Soak It Up (2010)
- Homeboy Sandman - The Carpenter (2010)
- Pigeon John - The Bomb (2010)
- The Death Set - Yo David Chase, You POV Shot Me In The Head feat. Diplo (2010)
