= All Points West Music & Arts Festival =

- Genre: Music / Arts
- Dates: First Weekend in August
- Locations: Liberty State Park; Jersey City, New Jersey, United States
- Years active: 2008-2009
- Founders: AEG Live; Goldenvoice; Liberty Event Management; Highline
- Website: www.apwfestival.com

The All Points West Music & Arts Festival was an annual music and arts festival held at Liberty State Park in Jersey City, New Jersey. First held in August 2008, it was hosted by Goldenvoice/AEG Live events, the same company that hosts the similar annual Coachella Valley Music and Arts Festival every year in Indio, California.The event lasts all day, from noon to about midnight, for eleven and a half hours per day. All Points West 2009 was held on July 31, August 1 and 2 featuring both music, comedy and art, much like its counterpart in Indio. The name of the festival was inspired by the vision of immigrants coming from Ellis Island to Jersey City and boarding trains at the Central Railroad of New Jersey Terminal for "all points west." The large scale art installations were organized by Paul Clemente.

== 2008 Line-up ==
=== Friday, August 8 ===
- Radiohead
- Andrew Bird
- CSS
- Duffy
- The Duke Spirit
- Forro in the Dark
- Girl Talk
- The Go! Team
- Grizzly Bear
- Joe Mangrum Art Installation "Pyramid"
- Little Brother
- Lowry
- Mates of State
- Michael Franti & Spearhead
- The New Pornographers
- Underworld
- Pawnshop Roses

=== Saturday, August 9 ===
- Radiohead
- Alberta Cross
- Animal Collective
- The Black Angels
- Chromeo
- Exit 105
- The Felice Brothers
- Kings of Leon
- K'naan
- Lily Holbrook
- Metric
- Nicole Atkins
- The Roots
- Sia
- The Virgins
- Your Vegas

=== Sunday, August 10 ===
- Jack Johnson
- Amadou & Mariam
- Ben Harper and the Innocent Criminals
- Ben Jelen
- Cat Power
- De Novo Dahl
- Earl Greyhound
- Grace Potter and the Nocturnals
- Jason Isbell
- Matt Costa
- Neil Halstead
- Rodrigo y Gabriela
- Rogue Wave
- The Secret Machines
- Trey Anastasio

== 2009 Line-up ==
=== Friday, July 31 ===
- Jay-Z
- Yeah Yeah Yeahs
- Vampire Weekend
- The National
- Fleet Foxes
- MSTRKRFT
- Q-Tip
- The Pharcyde
- Organized Konfusion
- The Knux
- Ra Ra Riot
- Seasick Steve
- Telepathe
- Shearwater
- Heartless Bastards
- Flying Lotus
- College Humor Live
- Arj Barker
- Eugene Mirman
- Bo Burnham

=== Saturday, August 1 ===
- Tool
- My Bloody Valentine
- Gogol Bordello
- Arctic Monkeys
- Neko Case
- The Ting Tings
- ...And You Will Know Us by the Trail of Dead
- Crystal Castles
- St. Vincent
- Tokyo Police Club
- The Cool Kids
- Kool Keith
- Cage the Elephant
- Chairlift
- White Rabbits
- Electric Touch
- The Postelles
- Black Gold
- College Humor Live
- Tim & Eric
- Judah Friedlander
- Jim Jefferies

=== Sunday, August 2 ===
- Coldplay
- Echo & the Bunnymen
- MGMT
- The Black Keys
- Elbow
- Silversun Pickups
- Mogwai
- We Are Scientists
- Ghostland Observatory
- Etienne De Crecy
- Lykke Li
- Akron/Family
- College Humor Live
- Janeane Garofalo
- Todd Barry
- La Roux

Due to inclement weather, the doors for the festival were not opened until 4pm on Sunday. All acts scheduled to go on stage prior to 4pm were cancelled, including:

- The Gaslight Anthem
- Kitty Daisy & Lewis
- Steel Train
- P.T. Walkley
