= Middle Distance Runner =

American indie rock band from Washington, D.C.

Middle Distance Runner was an American indie rock band from Washington, D.C.

Middle Distance Runner was founded in 1998, but the band didn't play a live show until 2005, shortly before the release of their debut album. The group was an early success on Internet music websites, and credited Amie Street and MySpace with improving their visibility early in their careers. Exposure on blogs, including USA Today's Pop Candy, also raised their profile. By 2007, the group had received notice in national publications such as Spin and The Washington Post. The group's founding bassist, Tony Acampora, left the group in the mid-2000s, and by 2007 had been replaced by Ian Glinka, a former member of the group Black Tie Revue. Both their debut album, 2006's Plane in Flames, and a 2007 self-titled EP were released independently. They signed with the label Engine Room Recordings for the release of 2009's The Sun & Earth. That same year, the group played at NASA's Goddard Visitor Center with space imagery accompaniment. In 2010, CNN reported that the group was "selling out shows around the country".

Little was heard from the group in the early 2010s, though they performed in 2013 in the DC area.

== Members ==
- Erik Dean – drums
- Tony Acampora – bass
- Ian Glinka – bass
- Jay Smith – guitar
- Allan Chappelear – guitar
- Stephen Kilroy – vocals

== Discography ==
- Plane in Flames (Self-released, 2006)
- Middle Distance Runner EP (Self-released, 2007)
- The Sun & Earth (Engine Room Recordings, 2009)
- Secret Things (Self-released, 2015)
