= Goat (musician) =

American singer

Andy Rosen, known by the stage name Goat, is an American singer, best known for his song "Great Life", which appeared on the soundtrack of the film, I Know What You Did Last Summer. The same song is perhaps more recognizable from its repeated airings in a Kia Sportage broadcast beginning in 2005, and played as people of various stripes toss the car keys to one another.

Born in Cleveland, Rosen's father Al Rosen was a star third baseman for the Cleveland Indians.

Goat recorded a cover version of Fall Out Boy's "Sugar, We're Goin' Down", for Engine Room Recordings' compilation album, Guilt by Association, released on September 4, 2007.

== Discography ==
- Great Life (1998)
- All of My Friends (2005)
- Twisted Heart (2006)
