= Dufus (band) =

US musical group

- Origin: New York City and Upstate New York, United States
- Genres: Anti-folk, progressive rock, experimental rock
- Years active: 1997–2010, 2023
- Labels: ROIR,
- Past members: Seth Faergolzia
- Website: www.dufus.tv

Dufus was an American band based in New York City, led by singer and songwriter Seth Faergolzia. It was dissolved in 2010.

== Format and history ==
Faergolzia is most well-known for his unusual songwriting and enigmatic voice of over 5 octaves. The band is known for their revolving door membership, with anywhere from two to 25 members on stage. Seth Faergolzia is the extremely prolific mainstay of the group but also tours as a solo artist and with his newer projects Multibird and Forest Creature.. He has performed in over 20 countries and recorded over 40 full-length albums. Faergolzia has worked with ROIR (Reach Out International Records) US, IronMan Records UK, Blang Records UK, Trikont Germany, Rough Trade UK, and most recently Needlejuice Records US. He has written a musical, Fun Wearing Underwear, performed in NYC's Lower East Side for four months.

Dufus, critically acclaimed as an avant-freakout band is noted for its experimentation, revolving door membership, and its communal amiability.

Seth Faergolzia recently completed a 12 album box set of unreleased music entitled "Painbow," consisting of four solo albums of new works, four solo albums of songs from the early 2000s, and four live albums of his early project Dufus.

== Music ==
Dufus's music is difficult to categorize but is experimental in nature and manages to maintain a melodic center. The band's music is profoundly odd, according to City Newspaper in Rochester, NY, and "like Johnny Cash on 5 double-espressos," according to Die Rheinpfalz in Germany. Village Voice, NYC, describes it as "As giddy and inventive as it is pissed off, it's the 21st-century equivalent of the Fugs at their finest." Pop Matters says, "I have never heard anything like this before or since."

The music itself is difficult to pin down. Justin Cober-Lake, in his 1:3:1 review for PopMatters puts it simply, "If all this sounds crazy to you, you're on the right track."

In 2010, since the dissolution of Dufus, Seth has been heading an ever-evolving musical endeavor known as Multibird, plus multiple side projects under his name and pseudonyms.

== Discography ==
=== Dufus ===
- The 2nd Phone (2023)
- Welcome to the June Haus (2023)
- Weirld (2023)
- The Noo Yoo Maschine (2023)
- Eth (2010)
- In Montstrous Attitude (2009)
- King Astronaut (2007)
- Legend of Walnut (2007)
- Bristol Hills Music Camp Experimental Orchestra (2007. Whprwhil Records)
- The Last Classed Blast (2006. Iron Man)
- Ball of Design (2004. ROIR)
- 1:3:1 (2002. ROIR)
- Neuborns (2001. Iron Man)
- Funderwear (2000)
- Th!s Revolution (1998)
- Eee-Lai-FoNt (1997)
