= Mekedonia =

Ethiopian non-profit, non-governmental humanitarian organization

- Mekedonia Humanitarian Association
- ሜቄዶንያ የበጎ አድራጎት ማህበር
- Formation: 7 January 2010; 16 years ago
- Founder: Benyam Belete
- Type: Humanitarian
- Purpose: Support for critically disabled and mentally ill people as well as elderly people
- Headquarters: Ayat Condominium
- Location: Addis Ababa, Ethiopia
- Coordinates: 9.02109534581431°N 38.89210528465594°E
- Services: Housing; Clothing; Counseling; Food
- Website: mekedoniahomes.org

Mekedonia Humanitarian Association (Amharic: ሜቄዶንያ የበጎ አድራጎት ማህበር), known simply as Mekedonia, is an Ethiopian non-governmental, non-profit independent humanitarian organization founded in January 2010 by Benyam Belete. It is the sole independent organization in Ethiopia that funds and supports critically disabled and mentally ill people as well as elderly people with provisions of housing, clothing, food and counseling.

== Overview ==
Mekedonia Humanitarian Association was founded on 7 January 2010 by Benyam Belete supporting elderly and mentally ill people. The organization supports them with housing, clothing, food, counseling, information and other necessities to elderly and disabled people. In this pursuit, MHU focuses on the most vulnerable people whose disabilities meet their priority social agendas and supports them with varied approaches and strategies. The organization is an Ethiopian Resident Charity under the legal supervision of the Ethiopian Federal Government Charities and Societies Agency and headquartered in Addis Ababa, Ethiopia in Ayat Condominium. The beneficiary residents are homeless people picked from different parts of the country.

== Recognition ==
In 2023, Addis Ababa University conferred an honorary doctorate degree upon founder Benyam Belete. The degree was conferred by then-President Sahle-Work Zewde at the university's graduation ceremony held at the Millennium Hall.
