= Ball of Design =

Studio album by Dufus
- Released: October 26, 2004
- Genre: Antifolk
- Label: ROIR

Dufus chronology
1:3:1 (2002)	Ball of Design (2004)	The Last Classed Blast (2006)

Ball of Design is an album by Dufus, released October 26, 2004.

== Track listing ==
1. Freedom
2. Wut Kolors
3. Wrinkle
4. Radiation
5. Specinal
6. Deemon
7. Pakistan Enellellope
8. Addictive
9. Kids
10. Civil War
11. Sunchein
