= Lowry (band) =

American indie rock band

- Lowry in a recent photo shoot in New York City

Background information
- Origin: Lawrence, Kansas
- Genres: Rock, folk, anti-folk, psychedelic folk
- Years active: 1998–present
- Label: Engine Room Recordings
- Members: Alex Lowry; Crash; Heidi Sidelinker; Greg Tuohey; Jasper Leak
- Website: lowrymusic.com

Lowry is a Brooklyn-based indie rock band with members originally hailing from Kansas, New Zealand, Australia, North Carolina and Canada. Originally emerging from New York City's "anti-folk" scene, the band has gone through several incarnations before settling into its current line-up in early 2008. Their debut studio album 'Awful Joy', which blended alternative country, psychedelia and rock was released in 2005. Signed to Engine Room Recordings in 2008, they released their sophomore studio album 'Love Is Dead' October 26, 2008.

Lowry appeared at the All Points West Music & Arts Festival on August 8, 2008, on the Queen of the Valley stage alongside Grizzly Bear, Andrew Bird, The Duke Spirit and Mates of State.

Lowry recorded a cover version of Toto's "Africa" for Engine Room Recordings' compilation album Guilt by Association Vol. 2, which was released in November 2008.

== Current members ==
- Alex Lowry · Singer/Writer/Guitar/Keyboards
- Crash · Drums/Vocals
- Heidi Sidelinker · Vocals/Banjo/Guitar/Percussion
- Greg Tuohey · Guitar
- Jasper Leak · Bass

== Discography ==
=== Albums ===
- Spent Movement (Brita Records, 1999)
- Left My Car on the Paseo (Brita Records, 2002)
- Awful Joy (OddMob music NYC, 2005)
- Live in Atlanta Unplugged (Independent Release, 2006)
- The Magazine EPs V.1 & 2 (ThunderBitch, 2007)
- Love Is Dead (Engine Room Recordings, 2008)

=== Compilations ===
- Guilt by Association Vol. 2 (Engine Room Recordings, 2008) Song: "Africa" (Toto cover)
