= SinDizzy =

S i n D i z z y
- Genres: Heavy metal, Christian metal
- Years active: 1997–2003
- Spinoff of: Stryper
- Past members: John Bocanegra; Bobby MacNeil; Oz Fox; Kevin Walt; Tim Gaines

SinDizzy was a Christian metal band co-founded by former Stryper members Oz Fox and Tim Gaines. The band was founded in the mid-1990s after Stryper had disbanded. Its members included young drummer John Bocanegra and lead guitarist Bobby MacNeil. Bass player Tim Gaines described their sound as "a cross between [the] Stone Temple Pilots and Nirvana".

== History ==
SinDizzy released their debut self-produced album, He's Not Dead, in 1998. The album sold well among the Christian metal fans, especially Stryper fans. However, it did not gather any mainstream success. The band played in several festivals in the United States. Notorious among these was a summer rock festival in Puerto Rico, where former frontman of Stryper, Michael Sweet, joined Sin Dizzy on stage in front of 11,000 and performed several Stryper hit songs.

Bassist Tim Gaines left the band in 2000 to continue working with his wife's musical career. Kevin Walt immediately replaced Gaines as SinDizzy's bass player. Plans for the recording of a future album were put on hold following the reunion of Stryper in 2003.

On November 28, 2008, SinDizzy re-released He's Not Dead (All Night Long) on Girder Records with all new artwork, liner notes and more, although the release was never authorized by Tim Gaines, who holds the rights to the SinDizzy name.

Guitarist Bobby MacNeil died in early 2013.

== Former members ==
- Oz Fox – guitars, lead vocals (1997–2003)
- John Bocanegra – drums (1997–2003)
- Bobby MacNeil – lead guitars (1997–2003)
- Kevin Walt – bass guitar (2000–2003)
- Tim Gaines – bass guitar (1997–2000)

== Discography ==
- He's Not Dead (1999)
