= The Bloodsugars =

American rock band from Brooklyn, NY

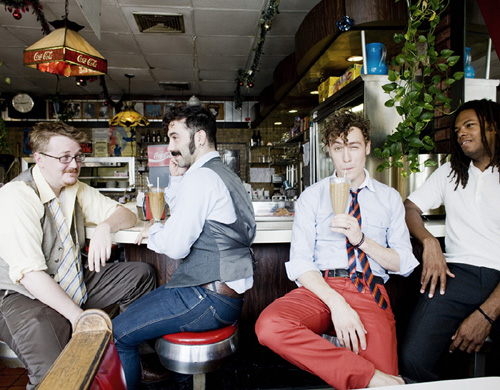
- The Bloodsugars' press photo for their recent album I Can't Go On, I'll Go On

Background information
- Origin: New York City
- Genres: Indie rock, synthpop, garage rock
- Label: Engine Room Recordings
- Members: Jason Rabinowitz; Brendan O'Grady; Matt Katz; Kenneth Salters
- Past members: David Beauchamp
- Website: official website

The Bloodsugars are a Brooklyn-based rock band, composed of Jason Rabinowitz, Brendan O'Grady, Matt Katz, and Kenneth Salters. Rabinowitz is the primary singer and songwriter in the band. David Beauchamp was the original drummer, but he left to focus on playing with Jeffrey Lewis, and Kenneth Salters took his place.

== Biography ==
The Bloodsugars are signed to Engine Room Recordings, a Manhattan-based indie label. Engine Room released their debut EP, BQEP, in 2008. Their debut album is titled I Can't Go On, I'll Go On.

The Bloodsugars recorded two songs for Guilt by Association Vol. 2, a compilation released by Engine Room Recordings featuring independent artists covering well-known pop and R&B songs from the 1980s, 1990s, and 2000s. They covered Laura Branigan's 1984 hit song "Self Control", as well as Chris de Burgh's 1986 hit song, "The Lady in Red" (released as an iTunes Store bonus track).

== Current members ==
- Jason Rabinowitz – Vocals, Guitar
- Brendan O'Grady – Bass
- Matt Katz – Synths
- Kenneth Salters – Drums

== Discography ==
=== Albums ===
- I Can't Go On, I'll Go On (Engine Room Recordings, 2009)
1. Light at the End of the Tunnel
2. The Pedestrian Boogie
3. Form/Function
4. Sleep Well (Cottage Industry)
5. Falling Makes You Blue
6. Happiness
7. Girls At
8. I Want It Back
9. Fly Along
10. Before the Accident

=== EPs ===
- BQEP (Engine Room Recordings, 2008)
1. Purpose Was Again - 4:19
2. Bloody Mary - 4:15
3. Cinderella - 3:05
4. Breakfast on the BQE - 4:55
5. Saint of Containment - 4:36
6. Uh Oh - 4:09

=== Compilations ===
- Guilt by Association Vol. 2 (Engine Room Recordings, 2008) Songs: "Self Control" (Laura Branigan cover) and "The Lady in Red" (Chris de Burgh cover)
