= Guilt by Association Vol. 3 =

Compilation album by various artists
- Released: November 15, 2011
- Genre: Indie rock, indie folk
- Label: Engine Room Recordings
- Producer: Chris Hacker & Darren Paltrowitz

Various artists chronology
Guilt by Association Vol. 2 (2008)	Guilt by Association Vol. 3 (2011)	Guilt by Association Vol. 4 (2016)

Guilt by Association Vol. 3 is a compilation album released November 15, 2011 by Engine Room Recordings. Like its previous installments, Guilt by Association Vol. 1 and Guilt by Association Vol. 2, Guilt By Association Vol. 3 features indie rock artists covering popular rock songs.

== Overview ==
In this, the third in the series of compilations released by Engine Room Recordings, Guilt by Association Vol. 3 features indie rock artists, including Canon Logic, Gold Lake and Helmet, covering their favorite guilty pleasure songs. Special to this part of the series is an added theme within a theme. All the songs on this album are covers of famous 80's hair metal tracks by such bands as Ratt and Cinderella. Conceived and compiled by Engine Room Recordings, the album brings together a variety of artists in the indie scene. Since its release, Guilt by Association Vol. 3 has received rave reviews.

== Track listing ==
#	Title	Artist(s)	Covered Artist
1	"Don't Know What You Got (Till It's Gone)"	Canon Logic	Cinderella
2	"Seventeen"	Gold Lake	Winger
3	"Nothin' but a Good Time"	Madison Square Gardeners	Poison
4	"Kickstart My Heart"	theSTART	Mötley Crüe
5	"Crazy Nights"	Helmet	Loudness
6	"Round And Round"	Mike Viola	Ratt
7	"Heavy Metal Love"	Elk City	Helix
8	"You Give Love a Bad Name"	Malibu Shark Attack	Bon Jovi
9	"We're Not Gonna Take It"	Common Rotation	Twisted Sister
10	"I Remember You"	Bird Of Youth	Skid Row
11	"Photograph"	Murder Mystery	Def Leppard
12	"More Than Words"	My Cousin, The Emperor	Extreme
13	"Here I Go Again"	The Old Ceremony	Whitesnake
14	"The Final Countdown"	Farrah	Europe

== See also ==
- Guilt by Association Vol. 1
- Guilt by Association Vol. 2
