= U.S. Royalty =

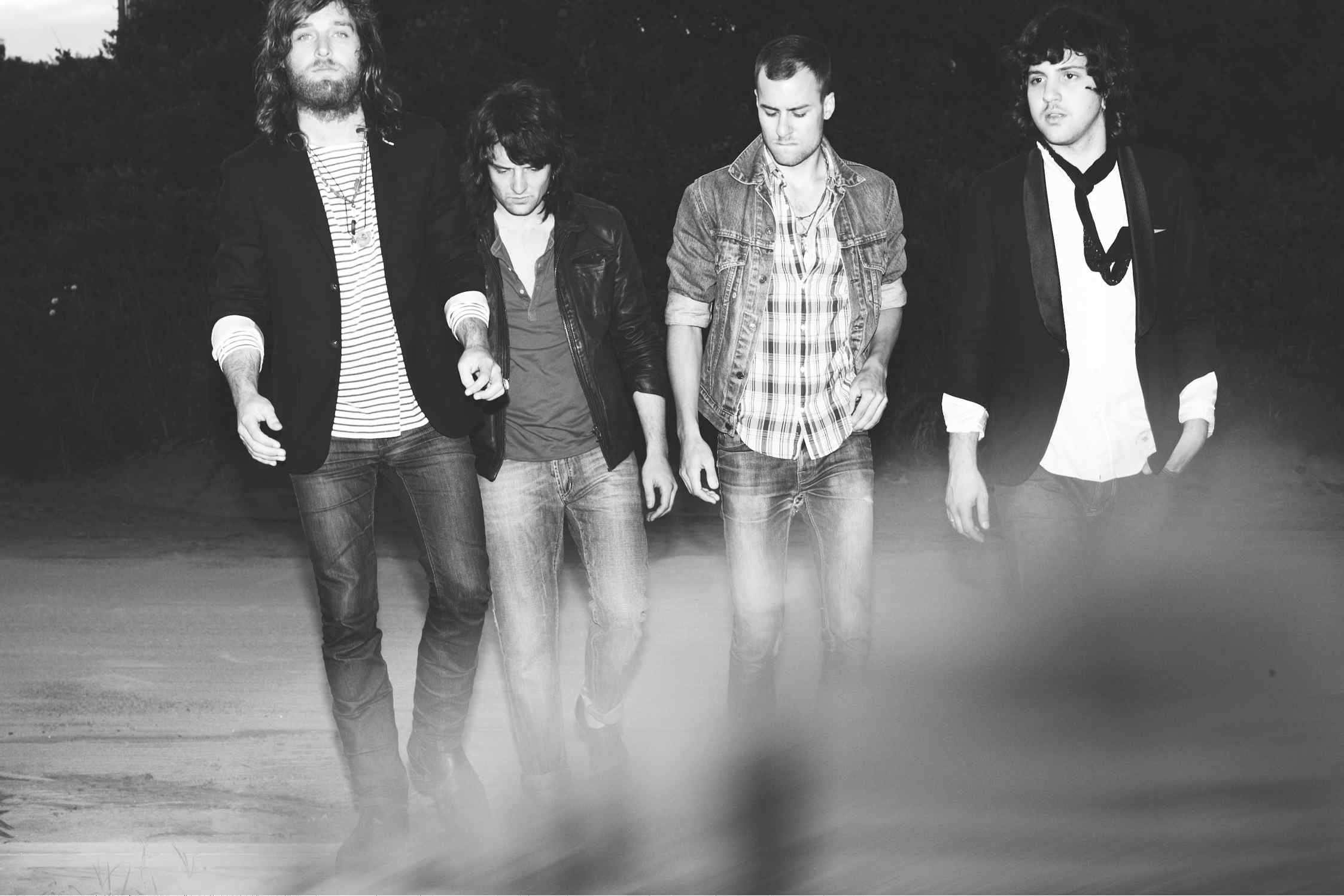
- U.S. Royalty

Background information
- Origin: Washington, D.C.
- Genres: Indie
- Years active: 2008–2017
- Labels: Unsigned
- Members: John Thornley; Paul Thornley; Jacob Michael; Luke Adams
- Website: official website

U.S. Royalty was a Washington, D.C.–based indie rock band, composed of singer John Thornley, guitarist Paul Thornley, bassist Jacob Michael, and drummer Luke Adams.

== Biography ==
Formed from the remnants of a few bands, they spent their first few months in a pink trailer, deep in the heart of Southern Maryland. U.S. Royalty was currently unsigned and released their debut album MIRRORS on January 25, 2011. After playing festivals CMJ, SXSW, and opening for Third Eye Blind for the majority of 2011, the band followed up MIRRORS with their album Blue Sunshine released on January 21, 2014.

In June 2017, U.S. Royalty announced on Facebook that they had agreed to part ways. The Thornley brothers created a new band called Born Rivals, while Jacob Michael will continue work with his Foreign Air project.

== Current members ==
- John Thornley – Vocals
- Paul Thornley – Guitar
- Jacob Michael – Bass
- Luke Adams – Drums

== Former member ==
- Lex Paulson – Keys

== Discography ==
=== Albums ===
- Mirrors (Self-Released, 2011)
- Blue Sunshine (Self-Released, January 21, 2014)

=== EPs ===
- Midsommar (Engine Room Recordings, 2009)
