= Engine Room Recordings =

- Founded: 2005
- Founder: Mark Christensen, Peter Block
- Genre: Indie rock, alternative rock
- Country of origin: United States
- Location: New York City
- Official website: engineroomrecordings.com

Engine Room Recordings is an independent record label with a roster of indie rock and alternative rock musicians. Beyond marketing and distribution for its artists, the label does booking and artist management. Engine Room Recordings is part of the Engine Room Audio group, a New York City-based company offering various services to recording artists.

Albums engineered or mastered at The Engine Room include Rest, Passion, Pain & Pleasure, Silent Steeples, 5 (Murder by Numbers), Chapter V, H.F.M. 2, and The Adventures of the Tiger Shadow by Tiger Shadow

== History ==
Founding

Engine Room Recordings was started by Mark B. Christensen and Peter Block in 2005. In 2006, the label released their first record, Twisted Heart by Goat. New York City-based band Porter Block soon joined the roster, and the label released their debut album, Suburban Sprawl.

Early albums and signings

In 2008, Engine Room released several albums, including Porter Block's second and third albums, Off Our Shoulders and Pueblo a Go Go. They signed Brooklyn-based band Lowry and released their 2008 album Love is Dead. Brooklyn-based The Bloodsugars joined the roster and Engine Room released their debut EP, BQEP. 2009 has seen the label grow to include Middle Distance Runner, U.S. Royalty, Israel Darling, and Luke Wesley. The label has already seen an active 2010 as well with the signings of Jody Porter of Fountains of Wayne and Tracy Bonham, best known for her 1996 single "Mother Mother", which held the top spot on the rock charts for over a month and garnered her two Grammy nominations that year.

Guilt by Association compilation series

Engine Room is also well known for producing the compilation series Guilt by Association. Guilt by Association Vol. 1 (2007), Guilt by Association Vol. 2 (2008) and Guilt by Association Vol. 3 (2011) feature various independent artists covering well-known pop, R&B and rock songs from the 1980s, 1990s, and 2000s. The contributing artists include top indie artists such as Bonnie "Prince" Billy, Devendra Banhart, My Brightest Diamond, Frightened Rabbit, Mike Viola and Helmet as well as up-and-coming artists such as Jukebox The Ghost, The Bloodsugars, and Canon Logic.

Sonicscoop published a series of articles on the making the Engine Room's A Tribute to Pinkerton compilation album. The album was first released in 2012.

Albums that have been worked on by Engine Room Audio and engineered or mastered by founder Mark Christensen include Rest, Passion, Pain & Pleasure, Silent Steeples, and 5 (Murder by Numbers). Others include Chapter V, H.F.M. 2, and The Adventures Of The Tiger Shadow by Tiger Shadow, mastered at The Engine Room in New York between May 2011 & January 2012.

== Artists ==
Current (active) artist

The following is an incomplete list of Engine Room Recordings active as of:

- The Bloodsugars
- Israel Darling
- Jody Porter
- Lowry
- Luke Wesley
- Middle Distance Runner
- Porter Block
- Tracy Bonham
- U.S. Royalty

Alumni (previous artists)

- Goat

== See also ==
- List of record labels
