= Guilt by Association Vol. 1 =

Guilt by Association

Compilation album by Guilt by Association (Various Artists)
- Released: September 4, 2007
- Genres: Indie rock, indie folk
- Length: 61:24
- Label: Engine Room Recordings
- Producers: Jim Dunbar, Randall Poster, & Asst. Prod. Morgan Lebus

Guilt by Association (Various Artists) chronology
Guilt by Association (2007)	Guilt by Association Vol. 2 (2008)

Guilt by Association Vol. 1 is a compilation album released September 4, 2007 by Engine Room Recordings. It features indie rock artists covering well-known pop and R&B songs.

== Overview ==
Conceived and compiled by Engine Room Recordings, the album brings together a variety of artists in the indie music scene.

Engine Room Recordings held a music video contest in support of the album's release. The winner was Andy Cahill, and his video for Devendra Banhart's cover of the Oasis song "Don't Look Back in Anger" is available for viewing on YouTube and Engine Room Recordings' homepage.

On November 18, 2008, Engine Room released a sequel, Guilt by Association Vol. 2. The third installment of the series, Guilt by Association Vol. 3, was released on November 15, 2011.

== Track listing ==
#	Title	Artist(s)	Featured guest(s)	Covered Artist
1	"Don't Stop Believin'"	Petra Haden		Journey
2	"Don't Look Back in Anger"	Devendra Banhart	Noah Georgeson	Oasis
3	"From This Moment On"	Mark Mulcahy		Shania Twain
4	"Straight Up"	Luna		Paula Abdul
5	"Back for Good"	The Concretes		Take That
6	"Viva Forever"	Jim O'Rourke		Spice Girls
7	"Sugar, We're Goin Down"	GOAT		Fall Out Boy
8	"Can't Take That Away (Mariah's Theme)"	Bonnie 'Prince' Billy		Mariah Carey
9	"Love's Theme"	Money Mark	The Woodrow Jackson Orchestra	Love Unlimited Orchestra
10	"Breaking Free"	Porter Block		High School Musical
11	"Just Like Jesse James"	The Mooney Suzuki		Cher
12	"Two Tickets To Paradise"	Geoff Farina		Eddie Money
13	"Chop Suey"	Casey Shea		System of a Down
14	"Say My Name"	Superchunk		Destiny's Child
15	"Burnin' for You"	Mike Watt		Blue Öyster Cult
16 (iTunes bonus)	"Careless Whisper"	Porter Block		Wham!

== Critical reception ==
Professional ratings
Review scores
Source	Rating
Alternative Press	2/5 stars
SPIN	
CMJ	
Pitchfork Media	(5.1/10)
NME	link
Stereogum	
Paste	

Harp Magazine has recognized the album, highlighting the juxtaposition between the independent nature of the cover artists and the mainstream popularity of the covered acts.

== See also ==
- Guilt by Association Vol. 2
- Guilt by Association Vol. 3
