= Guilt by Association Vol. 2 =

Compilation album by Guilt by Association (Various Artists)
- Released: November 18, 2008
- Genre: Indie rock, indie folk
- Label: Engine Room Recordings
- Producer: Wesley Verhoeve and Chris Hacker

Guilt by Association (Various Artists) chronology
Guilt by Association Vol. 1 (2007)	Guilt by Association Vol. 2 (2008)	Guilt by Association Vol. 3 (2011)

Professional ratings
Review scores
Source	Rating
Alternative Press	4/5 stars
Bullz-Eye.com	link

Guilt by Association Vol. 2 is a compilation album released November 18, 2008 by Engine Room Recordings. Like its predecessor, Guilt by Association Vol. 1, it features indie rock artists covering well-known pop and R&B songs.

== Overview ==
The second in a series of compilations released by Engine Room Recordings, Guilt by Association Vol. 2 features indie rock artists, including My Brightest Diamond and Frightened Rabbit, covering their favorite guilty pleasure pop songs. Conceived and compiled by Engine Room Recordings, the album brings together a variety of artists in the indie scene.

The third album in the series, Guilt by Association Vol. 3, was released on November 15, 2011.

== Track listing ==
#	Title	Artist(s)	Covered Artist
1	"Tainted Love"	My Brightest Diamond	Soft Cell/Gloria Jones
2	"Self Control"	The Bloodsugars	Laura Branigan
3	"Cool It Now"	Robbers on High Street	New Edition
4	"Set You Free"	Frightened Rabbit	N-Trance
5	"I'm Not Okay"	Matt Pond PA	My Chemical Romance
6	"In the Air Tonight"	Takka Takka	Phil Collins
7	"I Think She Knows"	Kaki King	Justin Timberlake
8	"Can't Tell Me Nothing"	Francis and the Lights	Kanye West
9	"Africa"	Lowry	Toto
10	"We Didn't Start the Fire"	The Forms	Billy Joel
11	"If You Leave"	Rafter	Orchestral Manoeuvres in the Dark
12	"Need You Tonight"	Cassettes Won't Listen	INXS
13	"It's a Beautiful Life"	Jukebox The Ghost	Ace of Base
14	"I Kissed a Girl"	Max Vernon	Katy Perry
15 (iTunes bonus)	"Lady In Red"	The Bloodsugars	Chris de Burgh

== See also ==
- Guilt by Association Vol. 1
- Guilt by Association Vol. 3
