= OMG Tour =

2010–11 concert tour by Usher

- Tour by Usher
- Promotional poster for the tour
- Associated album: Raymond v. Raymond, Versus
- Start date: November 10, 2010
- End date: June 1, 2011
- Legs: 4
- No. of shows: 92

Usher concert chronology
- One Night Stand: Ladies Only (2008); OMG Tour (2010–11); UR Experience Tour (2014–15)

OMG Tour was the fourth concert tour by American recording artist Usher. Visiting North America, Asia, Europe and Australia, the tour accompanies his sixth studio album, Raymond v. Raymond (2010), as well as his first extended play, Versus (2010). At the conclusion of 2011, the tour placed seventh on Billboard's annual, "Top 25 Tours", earning nearly $75 million with 73 shows.

== Background ==
In the summer of 2010, Usher competed in a dance battle against fellow R&B artist Chris Brown at the Reggae Sumfest. The battle sparked an Internet rumor of the two possibly going on tour. This was further pushed by producer Jermaine Dupri alluding that the two artists may be unaware of this upcoming tour. The singers later took to Twitter to ask who the fans would like to see them perform with. On September 8, 2010, the singer announced his touring trek (and revealed it was solo) for North America. Due to demand, many additional stops in Europe and Australia were added. It is Usher's first arena tour since The Truth Tour in 2004. To introduce the tour, Usher stated,

"Live performance has always been my thing. It's my purpose to master and capture the moment every time I have you connected. For me, I wanted to make sure that it was state of the art. I wanted to make sure that, in comparison to the other shows that are going on around the world, you get the type of experience that leave you saying, 'OMG.' [...] The look of the tour, it's a little futuristic but enough to capture your attention and leave you saying, 'OMG.' That's the whole point. With an incredible record, I wanted to also leave a great impression.

== Concert synopsis ==
The show began with Usher descending to the stage and then performing "Monstar", "She Don't Know" and "Yeah!" while wearing a helmet-like headpiece. During "Caught Up" he sang into a gold gun-shaped microphone, with which he performed tricks. The choreography of "More" included break dancing. While Usher sang "OMG", fireworks and confetti were set off.

== Critical reception ==
The Dallas Morning News Mario Tarradell enjoyed the show, writing that "splash and flash are[Usher's] key ingredients." Jim Harrington of San Jose Mercury News commended Usher's dancing ability, but criticized the show for over-using "distracting" theatrical effects, saying that "the best parts of the big-budget 'OMG' show came when the bells and whistles stopped and the fans were allowed to concentrate all their attention on Usher".

== Broadcast and recordings ==
The DVD of the OMG Tour was filmed on February 21, 2011, at The O_{2} Arena in London, directed by Dick Carruthers. The DVD was released as OMG Tour: Live From London on October 31, 2011.

== Set list ==
Usher performing at the Toyota Center

1. "Monstar"
2. "She Don't Know"
3. "Yeah!"
4. "U Remind Me"
5. "U Don't Have to Call"
6. Michael Jackson Tribute Medley: "Don't Stop 'Til You Get Enough"/ "Rock with You"/ "Billie Jean"
7. "You Make Me Wanna"
8. "Mars vs. Venus"
9. "Nice & Slow"
10. "Love 'Em All"
11. "Trading Places"
12. "Love in This Club"
13. "Lil Freak"
14. "Hot Tottie"
15. "There Goes My Baby"
16. "Burn"
17. "Bad Girl"
18. "Hey Daddy (Daddy's Home)"
19. Medley: "Confessions Part II" / "My Boo" / "I Need a Girl (Part One)" / "Lovers and Friends"
20. "Caught Up"
21. "DJ Got Us Fallin' in Love"
22. "More"

Encore

23. OMG

== Tour dates ==
List of concerts, showing date, city, country, venue, opening act, tickets sold, number of available tickets and amount of gross revenue
Date	City	Country	Venue	Opening act	Attendance	Revenue
Asia
July 3, 2010	Seoul	South Korea	Olympic Gymnastics Arena	—N/a	—N/a	—N/a
July 7, 2010	Kuala Lumpur	Malaysia	Bukit Jalil National Stadium	—N/a	—N/a	—N/a
July 9, 2010	Pasay	Philippines	Mall of Asia Concert Grounds	—N/a	—N/a	—N/a
July 11, 2010	Beijing	China	Beijing Wukesong Culture & Sports Center	—N/a	—N/a	—N/a
July 13, 2010	Macau		Venetian Arena	—N/a	—N/a	—N/a
North America
November 10, 2010	Seattle	United States	KeyArena	Trey Songz; Miguel	13,179 / 13,179	$900,792
November 12, 2010	Oakland	United States	Oracle Arena	Trey Songz; Miguel	15,613 / 15,613	$1,095,085
November 13, 2010	Las Vegas	United States	Mandalay Bay Events Center	Trey Songz; Miguel	78,398 / 78,398	$926,907
November 14, 2010	Anaheim	United States	Honda Center	Trey Songz; Miguel	11,354 / 11,354	$851,717
November 17, 2010	San Diego	United States	Valley View Casino Center	Trey Songz; Miguel	10,218 / 10,218	$655,930
November 18, 2010	Los Angeles	United States	Staples Center	Trey Songz; Miguel	14,607 / 14,607	$1,181,485
November 19, 2010	Glendale	United States	Jobing.com Arena	Trey Songz; Miguel	11,086 / 11,086	$818,907
November 23, 2010	Houston	United States	Toyota Center	Trey Songz; Miguel	12,812 / 12,812	$996,189
November 24, 2010	Dallas	United States	American Airlines Center	Trey Songz; Miguel	13,492 / 13,492	$937,622
November 26, 2010	St. Louis	United States	Scottrade Center	Trey Songz; Miguel	11,616 / 11,616	$777,678
November 27, 2010	Kansas City	United States	Sprint Center	Trey Songz; Miguel	14,291 / 14,291	$963,888
November 29, 2010	Toronto	Canada	Air Canada Centre	Trey Songz; Miguel	16,100 / 16,100	$1,291,800
November 30, 2010	Montreal	Canada	Bell Centre	Trey Songz; Miguel	15,260 / 15,260	$1,175,933
December 2, 2010	Detroit	United States	Joe Louis Arena	Trey Songz; Miguel	15,860 / 15,860	$1,037,999
December 3, 2010	Rosemont	United States	Allstate Arena	Trey Songz; Miguel	13,811 / 13,811	$1,065,640
December 5, 2010	Atlanta	United States	Philips Arena	Trey Songz; Miguel	14,137 / 14,137	$1,201,311
December 7, 2010	Greensboro	United States	Greensboro Coliseum	Trey Songz; Miguel	8,612 / 8,612	$519,616
December 8, 2010	Baltimore	United States	Royal Farms Arena	Trey Songz; Miguel	11,104 / 11,104	$795,628
December 10, 2010	Newark	United States	Prudential Center	Trey Songz; Miguel	14,410 / 14,410	$1,142,535
December 13, 2010	New York City	United States	Madison Square Garden	Trey Songz; Miguel	29,462 / 29,462	$2,567,864
December 14, 2010	New York City	United States	Madison Square Garden	Trey Songz; Miguel	29,462 / 29,462	$2,567,864
December 16, 2010	Philadelphia	United States	Wells Fargo Center	Trey Songz; Miguel	11,049 / 11,049	$889,097
December 17, 2010	Washington, D.C.	United States	Verizon Center	Trey Songz; Miguel	15,452 / 15,452	$1,226,629
December 18, 2010	Hartford	United States	XL Center	Trey Songz; Miguel	11,198 / 11,198	$674,877
December 21, 2010	Boston	United States	TD Garden	Trey Songz; Miguel	12,226 / 12,226	$901,581
December 27, 2010	Nashville	United States	Bridgestone Arena	Trey Songz; Miguel	12,219 / 12,219	$888,709
December 28, 2010	New Orleans	United States	Smoothie King Center	Trey Songz; Miguel	14,988 / 14,988	$937,802
December 29, 2010	Memphis	United States	FedExForum	Trey Songz; Miguel	11,350 / 11,350	$743,770
December 31, 2010	Miami	United States	American Airlines Arena	Trey Songz; Miguel	12,992 / 12,992	$1,235,545
Europe
January 18, 2011	Lyon	France	Halle Tony Garnier	—N/a	—N/a	—N/a
January 20, 2011	Marseille	France	Le Dôme de Marseille	—N/a	—N/a	—N/a
January 21, 2011	Zürich	Switzerland	Hallenstadion	—N/a	—N/a	—N/a
January 23, 2011	Strasbourg	France	Zénith de Strasbourg	—N/a	—N/a	—N/a
January 24, 2011	Paris	France	AccorHotels Arena	—N/a	—N/a	—N/a
January 26, 2011	Manchester	England	Manchester Arena	Tinchy Stryder	26,010 / 29,348	$1,335,360
January 27, 2011	Birmingham	England	Barclaycard Arena	—N/a	—N/a	—N/a
January 29, 2011	Glasgow	Scotland	Scottish Exhibition and Conference Centre	—N/a	—N/a	—N/a
January 30, 2011	Liverpool	England	Echo Arena Liverpool	—N/a	—N/a	—N/a
February 2, 2011	London	England	The O_{2} Arena	Tinchy Stryder	69,761 / 70,260	$4,656,200
February 3, 2011	London	England	The O_{2} Arena	Tinchy Stryder	69,761 / 70,260	$4,656,200
February 15, 2011	Paris	France	AccorHotels Arena	—N/a	—N/a	—N/a
February 17, 2011	London	England	The O_{2} Arena	Tinchy Stryder	(Note: The score data is representative of the five shows in London, England at The O2 Arena on February 2, February 3, February 17, February 18, and February 21 respectively.)	
February 18, 2011	London	England	The O_{2} Arena	Tinchy Stryder	(Note: The score data is representative of the five shows in London, England at The O2 Arena on February 2, February 3, February 17, February 18, and February 21 respectively.)	
February 20, 2011	Manchester	England	Manchester Arena	Tinchy Stryder	(Note: The score data is representative of the two shows in Manchester, UK at the Manchester Evening News Arena on January 26 and February 20 respectively.)	
February 21, 2011	London	England	The O_{2} Arena	Tinchy Stryder		
February 23, 2011	Sheffield	England	Sheffield Arena	—N/a	—N/a	—N/a
February 24, 2011	Liverpool	England	Echo Arena Liverpool	—N/a	—N/a	—N/a
February 26, 2011	Dublin	Ireland	3Arena	—N/a	—N/a	—N/a
February 27, 2011	Dublin	Ireland	3Arena	—N/a	—N/a	—N/a
March 1, 2011	Rotterdam	Netherlands	Rotterdam Ahoy	—N/a	—N/a	—N/a
March 2, 2011	Antwerp	Belgium	Sportpaleis	—N/a	31,248 / 31,812	$1,739,160
March 4, 2011	Munich	Germany	Olympiahalle	—N/a	—N/a	—N/a
March 5, 2011	Hamburg	Germany	Barclaycard Arena	—N/a	11,778 / 12,469	$732,505
March 6, 2011	Rotterdam	Netherlands	Rotterdam Ahoy	—N/a	—N/a	—N/a
March 7, 2011	Antwerp	Belgium	Sportpaleis	—N/a	(Note: The score data is representative of the two shows in Antwerp, Belgium at the Sportpaleis on March 2 and March 7.)	
Asia
March 10, 2011	Dubai	United Arab Emirates	Dubai Media City Amphitheatre	—N/a	—N/a	—N/a
March 12, 2011	Shanghai	China	Mercedes-Benz Arena	—N/a	—N/a	—N/a
Oceania
March 15, 2011	Perth	Australia	Burswood Dome	Trey Songz; The Potbelleez	18,560 / 18,560	$2,469,060
March 18, 2011	Adelaide	Australia	Adelaide Entertainment Centre	Trey Songz; The Potbelleez	9,155 / 9,155	$1,292,119
March 19, 2011	Melbourne	Australia	Rod Laver Arena	Trey Songz; The Potbelleez	62,075 / 62,075	$7,544,120
March 20, 2011	Melbourne	Australia	Rod Laver Arena	Trey Songz; The Potbelleez	62,075 / 62,075	$7,544,120
March 22, 2011	Newcastle	Australia	Newcastle Entertainment Centre	Trey Songz; The Potbelleez	6,941 / 6,989	$1,028,240
March 23, 2011	Sydney	Australia	Qudos Bank Arena	Trey Songz; The Potbelleez	55,792 / 60,148	$7,530,500
March 24, 2011	Sydney	Australia	Qudos Bank Arena	Trey Songz; The Potbelleez	55,792 / 60,148	$7,530,500
March 26, 2011	Brisbane	Australia	Brisbane Entertainment Centre	Trey Songz; The Potbelleez	11,482 / 11,482	$1,681,740
March 28, 2011	Sydney	Australia	Qudos Bank Arena	Trey Songz; The Potbelleez	(Note: The score data is representative of the four shows in Sydney, Australia at the Acer Arena on March 23, March 24, March 28, and March 29 respectively.)	
March 29, 2011	Sydney	Australia	Qudos Bank Arena	Trey Songz; The Potbelleez	(Note: The score data is representative of the four shows in Sydney, Australia at the Acer Arena on March 23, March 24, March 28, and March 29 respectively.)	
March 31, 2011	Melbourne	Australia	Rod Laver Arena	Trey Songz; The Potbelleez	(Note: The score data is representative of the five shows in Melbourne, Australia at the Rod Laver Arena on March 19, March 20, March 31, April 1, and April 2 respectively.)	
April 1, 2011	Melbourne	Australia	Rod Laver Arena	Trey Songz; The Potbelleez	(Note: The score data is representative of the five shows in Melbourne, Australia at the Rod Laver Arena on March 19, March 20, March 31, April 1, and April 2 respectively.)	
April 2, 2011	Melbourne	Australia	Rod Laver Arena	Trey Songz; The Potbelleez	(Note: The score data is representative of the five shows in Melbourne, Australia at the Rod Laver Arena on March 19, March 20, March 31, April 1, and April 2 respectively.)	
April 5, 2011	Auckland	New Zealand	Vector Arena	The Potbelleez	11,510 / 11,510	$1,019,420
North America
April 27, 2011	Sunrise	United States	Bank Atlantic Center	Akon; Tinie Tempah	10,039 / 10,039	$657,126
April 28, 2011	Orlando	United States	Amway Center	Akon; Dev and the Cataracs	9,807 / 9,807	$588,373
April 30, 2011	Charlotte	United States	Time Warner Cable Arena	Akon; Dev and the Cataracs	10,602 / 10,602	$644,240
May 1, 2011	Columbia	United States	Colonial Life Arena	Akon; Dev and the Cataracs	10,733 / 10,733	$629,370
May 4, 2011	Providence	United States	Dunkin' Donuts Center	Akon; Dev and the Cataracs	7,876 / 7,876	$479,703
May 6, 2011	Atlantic City	United States	Boardwalk Hall	Akon; Dev and the Cataracs	12,198 / 12,198	$861,681
May 7, 2011	Newark	United States	Prudential Center	Akon; Dev and the Cataracs	11,783 / 11,783	$890,168
May 8, 2011	Uniondale	United States	Nassau Veterans Memorial Coliseum	Akon; Dev and the Cataracs	9,502 / 9,502	$747,516
May 11, 2011	Pittsburgh	United States	Consol Energy Center	Akon; Dev and the Cataracs	13,044 / 13,044	$815,557
May 12, 2011	Cleveland	United States	Quicken Loans Arena	Akon; Dev and the Cataracs	11,501 / 11,501	$632,022
May 14, 2011	Toronto	Canada	Air Canada Centre	Akon; Dev and the Cataracs	15,984 / 15,984	$1,310,834
May 15, 2011	Auburn Hills	United States	The Palace of Auburn Hills	Akon; Dev and the Cataracs	11,689 / 11,689	$810,800
May 18, 2011	Columbus	United States	Jerome Schottenstein Center	Akon; Dev and the Cataracs	11,601 / 11,601	$735,854
May 20, 2011	Rosemont	United States	Allstate Arena	Akon; Dev and the Cataracs	10,766 / 10,766	$734,451
May 21, 2011	Minneapolis	United States	Target Center	Akon; Dev and the Cataracs	12,711 / 12,711	$804,713
May 22, 2011	Omaha	United States	CenturyLink Center Omaha	Akon; Dev and the Cataracs	14,424 / 14,424	$977,494
May 25, 2011	Vancouver	Canada	Rogers Arena	Akon; Dev and the Cataracs	14,133 / 14,133	$1,180,892
May 26, 2011	Portland	United States	Moda Center	Akon; Dev and the Cataracs	10,099 / 10,099	$667,846
May 28, 2011	Sacramento	United States	Sleep Train Arena	Akon; Dev and the Cataracs	10,798 / 10,798	$574,199
May 29, 2011	San Jose	United States	SAP Center at San Jose	Akon; Dev and the Cataracs	10,725 / 10,725	$614,277
June 1, 2011	Los Angeles	United States	Staples Center	Akon; Tinie Tempah	12,614 / 12,614	$1,087,547
TOTAL					855,903 / 865,399 (99%)	$70,212,894

Cancellations and rescheduled shows

December 11, 2010	Norfolk, Virginia	Norfolk Scope	Cancelled
January 12, 2011	Berlin, Germany	Mercedes-Benz Arena	Initially postponed to January 13, 2011, however, the concert was cancelled 45 minutes into the show
January 14, 2011	Rotterdam, Netherlands	Rotterdam Ahoy	Postponed then rescheduled to March 1, 2011
January 15, 2011	Oberhausen, Germany	König-Pilsener Arena	Cancelled
January 16, 2011	Antwerp, Belgium	Sportpaleis	Postponed then rescheduled to March 2, 2011
March 29, 2011	Auckland, New Zealand	Vector Arena	This concert was moved to April 5, 2011

== Personnel ==
- Director – Barry Lather
- Choreography – Anwar "Flii Stylz" Burton, Aakomon "AJ" Jones, Todd Sams, Ed Moore and David "SuperDave" Royster
- Musical Direction – Johnny "Natural" Najera, Josh Thomas and Usher Raymond IV
- Art/Creative – Barry Lather, Josh Thomas, Anwar "Flii Stylz" Burton, Usher Raymond IV, Ed Moore and Aakomon "AJ" Jones
- Dancers – Devin Jamieson, Marc "Marvelous" Inniss, Saidah Nairobi, Eyal Layani, Eddie Morales, and Todd Sams
