= Versus (Usher EP) =

EP by Usher
- Released: July 20, 2010
- Genres: Europop; R&B
- Length: 37:51
- Labels: LaFace; Jive
- Producers: Alexander "Prettyboifresh" Parhm Jr.; Max Martin; Shellback; Polow da Don; Rico Love; Dwayne "D-Town" Nesmith; Jimmy Jam & Terry Lewis; Jim Jonsin; Benny Blanco; Christopher "Drumma Boy" Gholson; The Avila Brothers

Usher chronology
Raymond v. Raymond (2010)	Versus (2010)	Looking 4 Myself (2012)

Singles from Versus
- 1. "DJ Got Us Fallin' in Love" Released: July 12, 2010; 2. "Hot Tottie" Released: August 9, 2010; 3. "Lay You Down" Released: September 28, 2010

Versus is the first EP by American singer Usher. It was released on July 20, 2010 on LaFace Records and Jive Records in conjunction with the deluxe edition of his sixth studio album Raymond v. Raymond. Several producers contributed to the production of the EP, including Polow da Don, Jim Jonsin, Rico Love, Drumma Boy, Jimmy Jam and Terry Lewis, and Max Martin. Versus is marked as "the last chapter of Raymond v. Raymond", and follows the theme of Usher exploring around the subjects of being newly single and a father.

Preceding the EP's release was the lead single "DJ Got Us Fallin' in Love", which achieved international success. The song peaked at number four on the US Billboard Hot 100, and peaked inside the top-ten in several other countries singles charts. "Hot Tottie" and "Lay You Down" were released as the second and third singles, respectively, with the former becoming a US top-thirty hit. To promote the album, Usher appeared in several award and television shows, including Good Morning America, The Ellen DeGeneres Show and Jimmy Kimmel Live!.

Versus debuted at number four on the US Billboard 200 chart, selling 46,000 copies in its first week. It became Usher's sixth top-ten album and has sold 302,000 copies in the US. Despite some criticism towards its pop-oriented material, the EP received generally positive reviews from most music critics. It earned Usher several nominations, including a Billboard Music Award, an International Dance Music Award and a NRJ Music Award.

== Background ==
In 2009, in an interview with People Magazine, Usher, whose private life has been highly documented after filing for divorce from wife Tameka Foster, told that his sixth studio album will be, "racy, risky and edgy, and sometimes about personal experiences." In March, 2010, he released the album under the title Raymond v. Raymond. Upon its release, Raymond v. Raymond received generally mixed reviews from music critics, who were ambivalent towards its songwriting and themes. However, the album was a commercial success and peaked at number one on the US Billboard 200 chart, with sales of 329,000 for its first week; it became Usher's third consecutive US number one album.

On July 8, 2010, Versus was announced as a follow-up to Raymond v. Raymond, and is Usher's first extended play. Described during a press release as "the last chapter of Raymond v. Raymond", he stated that the EP will explore the subjects of being newly single and a father. It would include Raymond v. Raymond single "There Goes My Baby", as well as 8 new tracks. Several producers from the latter album contributed to the production of the EP, including Polow da Don, Jim Jonsin, Rico Love, Drumma Boy, Jimmy Jam and Terry Lewis, Tha Cornaboyz and Max Martin. Versus' track listing and album cover was revealed on July 21, 2010.

== Composition ==
"DJ Got Us Fallin' in Love"
The chorus of "DJ Got Us Fallin' in Love", leading to Pitbull's verse.

The EP is a Europop and R&B project that also incorporates elements of pop, dance-pop and hip-hop. Its lead single, "DJ Got Us Fallin' in Love" is a Europop track, with electronic and dance-pop influence. About.com's Mark Nero summed up its lyrics, to simply be "going clubbing on a Friday night". "Hot Tottie" is an R&B song that incorporates hip-hop, which is over strobing, electronic beats with Usher's vocals auto-tuned in parts; the song contains a verse from rapper Jay-Z, whose appearance was lauded by critics. "There Goes My Baby" is a down-tempo R&B ballad, with elements of neo soul; the song primarily uses Usher's falsetto range. Both "Lay You Down" and "Lingerie" contain influences from pop artists, with the former channelling Prince whilst the latter, Michael Jackson. In an interview with music video website Vevo, Usher explained that "Lay You Down" is a "classic R&B baby maker".

== Singles ==
"DJ Got Us Fallin' in Love", featuring Pitbull, produced by Max Martin is the first single off the EP. It was released to iTunes on July 13, 2010 and officially sent to radio on July 20, 2010. The song received generally positive reviews from critics, who complemented its production but were ambivalent towards its lack of originality; the song was largely compared to "OMG" due to its club nature. Since its release, it has gained international success, peaking in the top three in Canada, Japan, Australia, France, and Hungary and in the top ten in several other countries. The song became Usher's sixteenth Billboard Hot 100 top-ten hit, peaking at number-four on the chart, and number two on the US Pop Songs Chart. As of February 2011, the song has sold over 3 million digital units, making it the second single to exceed the sales figure for both Usher and featured artist Pitbull.

"Hot Tottie", featuring Jay-Z, produced by Polow Da Don and written by Usher, Shawn Carter, and Ester Dean, is the second single. It was released for urban radio on August 9, 2010. Ciara was originally reported to be on the song, but did not appear on the final track. The song received very positive reviews from critics, who praised rapper Jay-Z's verse and Usher's vocals. It peaked at number nine on the Hot R&B/Hip-Hop Songs chart, and number 21 on the Billboard Hot 100 chart. Internationally, "Hot Tottie" peaked at number sixty-two on the Canadian Hot 100. Although it was not released officially as a single in the UK, the song reached number 104 on the UK Singles Chart and number twenty-seven on the UK R&B Chart due to sales after the release of Versus only. "Lay You Down", produced by Rico Love and Dwayne Nesmith, is the third single and was sent to urban radio on September 28, 2010. It maintained a peak of number fifty-six on the R&B/Hip-Hop Songs, due to only being released to radio. Sara Anderson of AOL wrote that the song opens "with improvisational, high-pitched 'ooohs' and base-driven synth beats [...]."

== Release and promotion ==
The EP was released on August 24, 2010 in the United States. The set was preceded by the lead single "DJ Got Us Fallin' in Love" for mainstream audiences, and "Hot Tottie" for urban audiences. Versus' tracks are included on the deluxe edition of Raymond v. Raymond; the album was released in the United States conjointly with Versus, and released in the United Kingdom on September 20, 2010. The international version of Versus was not released as an EP, but instead as a full album in select countries. It includes the original tracks from the EP, as well as singles from Raymond v. Raymond, including "More", "OMG", "Lil Freak", "Hey Daddy (Daddy's Home)" and "Papers".

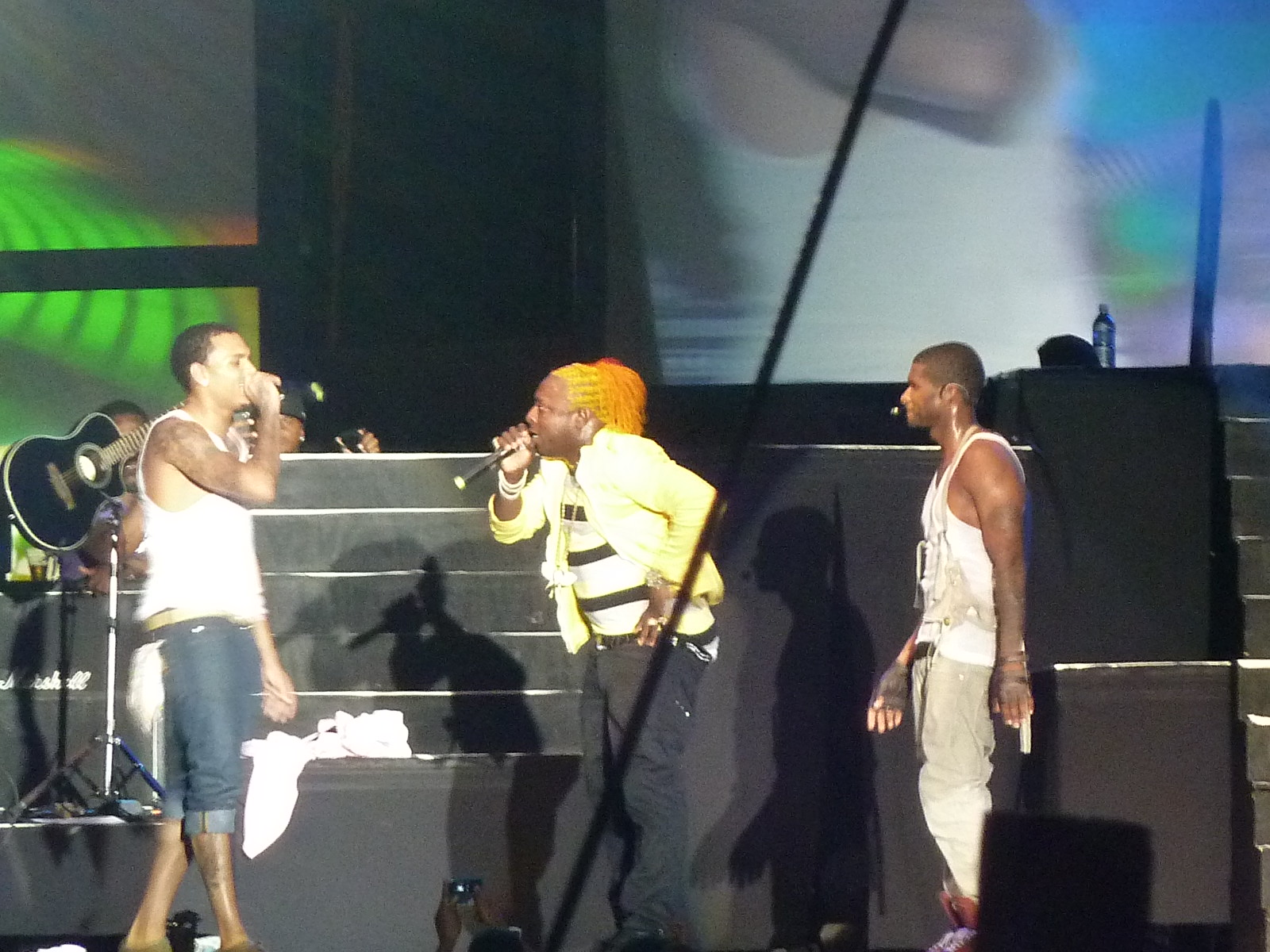
Usher and Chris Brown with Elephant Man at the 2010 Reggae Sumfest. The two dancing stimulating rumours of a joint tour.

Usher performed the lead single "DJ Got Us Fallin' in Love" in several shows, the first being Good Morning America; he performed it alongside "OMG". He performed both songs again during the 2010 MTV Music Video Awards. Jayson Rodriguez of MTV lauded the performance, writing that "Usher plays to win, and after his stirring performance it's clear that the crown still rests securely on his head". A few days later, Usher performed the song—whilst also interviewed—on The Ellen DeGeneres Show. On September 17, 2010, he performed the song alongside "There Goes My Baby" on Jimmy Kimmel Live!. Usher performed "DJ Got Us Fallin' in Love" in the season five finale of America's Got Talent, and in the seventh season of The X Factor. Usher performed "Hot Tottie" on an untelevised portion of his appearance on The Early Show on September 3, 2010, and performed it on his OMG Tour, alongside "DJ Got Us Fallin' in Love".

=== Tour ===
In the summer of 2010, Usher competed in a dance battle against fellow R&B artist Chris Brown at the Reggae Sumfest. The battle sparked an Internet rumor of the two possibly going on tour. This was further pushed by producer Jermaine Dupri alluding that the two artist may be unaware of this upcoming tour. The singers later took to Twitter to ask who the fans would like to see them perform with. On September 8, 2010, the singer announced his touring trek (and revealed it was solo) for North America. Due to demand, many additional stops in Europe and Australasia were added. It is Usher's first arena tour since his 2004 effort, The Truth Tour. The then announced OMG Tour commenced on November 10, 2010 and concluded on June 1, 2011 with Usher performing in a total of 92 shows. In its conclusion, the tour placed seventh on Billboard's annual "Top 25 Tours", earning nearly $75 million.

== Critical reception ==
Versus received generally positive reviews from music critics. At Metacritic, which assigns a normalized rating out of 100 to reviews from mainstream critics, the album received an average score of 65, based on 6 reviews. Mikael Wood of Entertainment Weekly gave it an "A−" and said that "'Love 'Em All' describes an egalitarian sexual appetite, while 'Lingerie' offers prime faux-Prince boudoir funk. The Max Martin-produced 'DJ Got Us Fallin' in Love' shows 'OMG' didn't satisfy Usher's dance-pop Jones, but he's hardly gone soft: 'Hot Tottie,' with Jay-Z, is nasty in all the right ways." Sarah Rodman of The Boston Globe complimented its "compact running time" and stated "Instead of ho-hum filler, 'Versus' offers the strongest arrows in Usher’s quiver". About.com's Mark Edward Nero gave the EP three-and-a-half out of five stars and wrote that Usher has "regained his mojo", while recommending it to fans of his music: "nine songs - seven of them new - clocking in at 38 minutes is a good deal for this solid package of music." Steve Jones of USA Today gave Versus three out of four stars and called it "an abbreviated batch of fresh songs that can stand alone or as part of a deluxe original". Billboard's Gail Mitchell commended the album's guest artists and wrote that it "alternately bumps and throbs as a reinvigorated Usher further paves his comeback path"

Jeff Weiss of the Los Angeles Times gave the EP two-and-a-half out of four stars and found "Hot Tottie" to be "intoxicating as its namesake", but disapproved of some of the generic points and pop efforts. The Washington Post's Sean Fennessey criticized its pop-oriented tracks, stating "Usher works best in emotional hailstorms, not candy rain", and viewed that it "finds him in Peter Pan mode, digging for remnants of a younger self that never existed". Andy Kellman of AllMusic gave it two out of five stars and said that it "mostly resembles a batch of leftovers from his weakest album, even though it functioned as a momentum maintainer". Kellman dismissed its productions as "innocuous Euro-pop" and "merely passable contemporary R&B". In a one-star review, Slant Magazine's Erich Henderson panned Versus as a "wretched collection of failed club-sex jams".

=== Accolades ===
The EP's lead single "DJ Got Us Fallin' in Love" earned Usher several award nominations, including a Billboard Music Award, an International Dance Music Award and a NRJ Music Award. "There Goes My Baby" also earned Usher nominations, for a Billboard Music Award and a Soul Train Music Award; the song won its nomination at the 53rd Grammy Awards in 2011, for Best Male R&B Vocal Performance. As an act, Usher received numerous accolades, such as being ranked as the third most successful Billboard Hot 100 artist of 2010, and the top R&B/Hip Hop Artist of that year. He was ranked as the sixth top overall artist of 2010, from the success of both Raymond v. Raymond and Versus.

== Commercial performance ==
Versus debuted at number four on the US Billboard 200 chart, selling 46,000 copies in its first week. This became Usher's sixth US top-ten album. In its second week, the EP dropped to number 13 on the chart, selling an additional 22,450 copies. In its third week, the EP dropped to number 15 on the chart, selling 17,000 more copies. In its fourth week, the EP dropped to number 16 on the chart, selling 18,000 copies, bringing its four-week total to 103,450 copies. As of May 2012, the EP has sold 302,000 copies in the United States.

The EP obtained moderate to high charting success outside of the US; it debuted and peaked at number twelve in Canada. In Belgium (Flanders) the EP peaked at number twenty-seven, and remained on the chart for the longest compared to other countries it charted in, staying for twenty-eight weeks. Versus achieved similar success in France, Netherlands and Germany, peaking in the top-40.

== Track listing ==
No.	Title	Writer(s)	Producer(s)	Length
1.	"Love 'Em All"	Ester Dean; Usher Raymond; Keith Thomas; Alexander "Prettyboifresh" Parhm Jr.; Aubry Delaine; Jeremy "Jay" Stevenson	Parhm Jr.	3:48
2.	"DJ Got Us Fallin' in Love" (featuring Pitbull)	Max Martin; Shellback; Savan Kotecha; Armando C. Pérez	Martin; Shellback	3:40
3.	"Hot Tottie" (featuring Jay-Z)	Raymond; Dean; Shawn Carter; Jamal Jones; Paul Dawson	Polow da Don	4:59
4.	"Lay You Down"	Rico Love; Raymond; Dwayne "D-Town" Nesmith	Love; Nesmith	4:03
5.	"Lingerie"	Raymond; James Harris III; Terry Lewis; Bobby Ross Avila; Issiah J. Avila	Jimmy Jam; Lewis; The Avila Brothers	4:13
6.	"There Goes My Baby"	Love; James Scheffer; Frank Romano; Danny Morris	Jim Jonsin; Love	4:43
7.	"Get in My Car" (featuring Bun B)	Raymond; Dean; Jones; Bernard Freeman; Marc Benno; Leon Russell	Polow da Don	4:09
8.	"Somebody to Love" (featuring Justin Bieber)	Jeremy Reeves; Ray Romulus; Jonathan Yip; Heather Bright	Benny Blanco; Stereotypes (vocal)	3:28
9.	"Stranger"	Ryon Lovette; Raymond; Christopher Gholson	Drumma Boy	4:48
Total length:				37:51

International bonus tracks
No.	Title	Writer(s)	Producer(s)	Length
10.	"Dirty Dancer" (with Enrique Iglesias)	Bogart; Iglesias; Nadir Khayat; Nuri; Quinones	RedOne	3:39
11.	"More"	Bilal Hajji; Khayat; Charles Hinshaw Jr.; Raymond	RedOne	3:49
12.	"OMG" (featuring will.i.am)	William Adams	will.i.am	4:29
13.	"Hey Daddy (Daddy's Home)"	Love; The Runners; Raymond; Algernod Washington	The Runners; Love	4:16
14.	"Papers"	Raymond; Sean Garrett; Xavier Doton; Alonzo Mathis	Zaytoven; Garrett	4:21
15.	"Lil Freak" (featuring Nicki Minaj)	Raymond; Onika Maraj; Polow da Don; Dean; Elvis Williams	Polow da Don	3:54

Sample credits

- "Get in My Car" samples Leon Russell and Marc Benno's song "Mr. Henri the Clown".
- "Lil Freak" samples Stevie Wonder's 1973 "Living for the City".

== Credits and personnel ==
Credits for Versus adapted from Allmusic.

- The Avila Brothers – producer
- Bobby Ross Avila – synthesizer, bass, guitar, strings, vocoder, Fender Rhodes
- Walid Azami – photography
- Charlie Bisharat – strings
- Benny Blanco – drums, keyboards, programming, remix producer, remix engineer
- Al Burna – vocal engineer
- Dru Castro – harp
- Lysa Cooper – stylist
- Tom Coyne – mastering
- Ian Cross – engineer
- Lisa D. Dandlinger – strings
- Aubry "Big Juice" Delaine – engineer
- Lamar Edwards – keyboards
- Lauren Evans – vocals (background)
- Serban Ghenea – mixing
- Christopher "Drumma Boy" Gholson – programming, producer
- Matty Green – assistant
- John Hanes – mixing
- Jennifer L. Heilig – strings
- Patrick Hewlett – assistant
- Sam Holland – engineer
- Bob Horn – mixing
- Hot Sauce – keyboards
- Jimmy Jam – strings, producer
- Jaycen Joshua – mixing
- Jim Jonsin – keyboards, programming, producer
- Josh Mosser – engineer
- Songa Lee – strings
- Jeremy "J Boogs" Levin – remix production coordinator
- Terry Lewis – producer
- Giancarlo Lino – assistant
- Rico Love – vocals, producer
- Marjan Malakpour – stylist
- Rob Marks – engineer, mixing
- Matt Marrin – engineer
- Max Martin – producer, instrumentation
- Thurston McCrea – assistant
- Andrew Mezzi – assistant
- Danny Morris – keyboards
- Dwayne Nesmith – keyboards, programming, producer
- Alec Newell – engineer
- Anthony Palazole – assistant
- Joel Pargman – strings
- Alexander "Prettyboifresh" Parhm Jr. – producer
- Nicole Patterson – make-up
- Jonnetta Patton – artist development
- Mark Pitts – executive producer
- Polow da Don – producer
- Shawn Porter – groomer
- Usher Raymond – executive producer
- Tim Roberts – assistant engineer, mixing assistant
- Frank Romano – guitar
- Lisa Rydell – art direction, design
- Shellback – producer, instrumentation
- Rob Skipworth – engineer
- Brian Stanley – mixing
- Mark "Spike" Stent – mixing
- The Stereotypes – vocal producer
- Jay Stevenson – engineer, mixing
- Jeremy Stevenson – engineer
- Usher – vocals (background)
- Jason Wilkie – assistant
- Tremaine Williams – engineer
- Evan Wilson – strings
- James Wisner – engineer
- Emily Wright – engineer
- Christine Wu – strings
- Andrew Wuepper – assistant

== Charts ==
=== Weekly charts ===
Weekly chart performance for Versus
Chart (2010)	Peak position
Belgian Albums (Ultratop Flanders)	27
Belgian Albums (Ultratop Wallonia)	55
Canadian Albums (Billboard)	12
Dutch Albums (Album Top 100)	40
French Albums (SNEP)	26
German Albums (Offizielle Top 100)	35
German Download Albums (GfK)	7
Greek Albums (IFPI)	60
Italian Albums (FIMI)	91
Mexican Albums (Top 100 Mexico)	92
Swiss Albums (Schweizer Hitparade)	33
US Billboard 200	4
US Top R&B/Hip-Hop Albums (Billboard)	3

=== Year-end charts ===
Chart (2010)	Position
French Albums (SNEP)	200
US Billboard 200	186
US Top R&B/Hip-Hop Albums (Billboard)	45

== Release history ==
Region	Date	Label	Version
Australia	July 20, 2010	LaFace Records	EP
New Zealand	July 20, 2010	LaFace Records	EP
United States	August 24, 2010	LaFace Records	EP
Canada	August 24, 2010	LaFace Records	EP
Netherlands	September 17, 2010	Jive Records	Album
United Kingdom	September 26, 2010	Sony Music Entertainment	EP
Germany	October 1, 2010	Arista Records	Album
Switzerland	October 1, 2010	Jive Records	Album
France	October 25, 2010	LaFace Records	Album
Brazil	November 15, 2010	Sony Music Entertainment	Album
