= Raymond v. Raymond =

Studio album by Usher
- Released: March 30, 2010
- Recorded: 2008–2009
- Studio: Studio at the Palms (Paradise, Nevada)
- Genre: R&B
- Length: 58:59
- Labels: LaFace; Jive
- Producers: Jermaine Dupri; Bryan-Michael Cox; will.i.am; Zaytoven; Polow da Don; RedOne; Danja; The Runners; Jim Jonsin; Jimmy Jam and Terry Lewis; Bangladesh; Sean Garrett

Usher chronology
Here I Stand (2008)	Raymond v. Raymond (2010)	Versus (2010)

Deluxe edition cover

Singles from Raymond v. Raymond
- 1. "Papers" Released: October 16, 2009; 2. "Hey Daddy (Daddy's Home)" Released: December 8, 2009; 3. "Lil Freak" Released: March 2, 2010; 4. "OMG" Released: March 22, 2010; 5. "There Goes My Baby" Released: June 15, 2010; 6. "More" Released: November 22, 2010

Raymond v. Raymond is the sixth studio album by American singer Usher, released on March 30, 2010, by LaFace Records. Production for the album took place in 2009 and was handled by various producers, including Jermaine Dupri, The Runners, Ester Dean, Polow da Don, RedOne, Jim Jonsin, Danja, Jimmy Jam & Terry Lewis, Bangladesh, Zaytoven, and Tricky Stewart.

The album debuted at number one on the US Billboard 200 chart, selling 329,000 copies in its first week. It is certified three-times platinum by the Recording Industry Association of America (RIAA) for sales of three million copies in the United States. The album also produced five singles that achieved chart success, including US hits "Hey Daddy (Daddy's Home)", "Lil Freak", "There Goes My Baby", and international hits "OMG" and "More".

Upon its release, Raymond v. Raymond received generally mixed reviews from music critics, who were ambivalent towards its songwriting and themes. Nonetheless, the album earned Usher several awards, including Grammy Awards for Best Contemporary R&B Album and Best Male R&B Vocal Performance. Usher promoted the album with a supporting international tour, OMG Tour, in 2011.

== Background ==
In December 2005, Usher became romantically involved with stylist Tameka Foster, whom he then married on August 3, 2007. Foster gave birth to Usher Raymond V later that year. Usher released his fifth studio album Here I Stand on May 13, 2008. It featured more mature, adult-oriented themes, influenced by his marriage to Foster; this thematic shift ultimately led to the album becoming less successful with fans and sales than his previous work. A year and a half later on June 12, 2009, following his marriage, Usher filed for divorce from Foster, with no initial reasoning. Once the divorce was finalized on November 8 that year, Usher explained that there was "no reasonable hope of reconciliation" and their marriage was "irretrievably broken"; both Foster and Usher had been living separately since July 2008. The divorce was highly documented by the press.

People felt like I'd stepped away from the perception I'd sold for all the years I'd been doing this, when people buy my albums, they buy them for the connection. Here I Stand was very specific to where I was in my life. I don't think everyone was there.

— Usher's interpretation of Here I Stand's low performance.

Prior to the filing, Usher relocated to Las Vegas in 2009 to begin working on his sixth studio album. The album was recorded at the Studio at the Palms in Vegas and Atlanta. Producers involved with its production included Jermaine Dupri, The Runners, Ester Dean, Polow da Don, RedOne, Jim Jonsin, |Danja, Jimmy Jam & Terry Lewis, Bangladesh and Tricky Stewart. Initially under the title Monster, the album's name was changed to Raymond v. Raymond, taking inspiration from the 1979 American drama film Kramer vs. Kramer.

Raymond v. Raymond mirrors Usher's 2004 Confessions, as a self-confessional album, with several recordings from the album inferring to Usher's marriage. Jive Records urban music president and album executive producer Mark Pitts also conceived the album as a return to the themes of the latter album; "based on what happened with Confessions", Pitts wanted to reproduce its success. Pitts told The New York Times that "Usher had a rough couple years", elaborating: "The scrutiny of everything going on, he was worrying too much about what people were thinking. We felt like we had to get his swagger back. Dust off the bed and get it popping and young again." Pitts noted that it was important Raymond v. Raymond addressed the rumors that circulated around Usher's marriage. The latter reiterated that the album is not specifically about his marriage, and that it is "about the tug-of-war between man and woman, and the honesty a man has to have."

== Singles ==
"Hey Daddy (Daddy's Home)" was released as the first single on December 8, 2009. The single peaked at number 24 on the Billboard Hot 100 chart and number two on the Hot R&B/Hip-Hop Songs chart. The song also peaked at number sixty-eight on the Austrian Singles Chart. Its music video was directed by Chris Robinson, and was shot in West Hollywood at "The London". It premiered on MTV on January 28, 2010. For the album's second single, "Lil Freak", Usher and featured artist Nicki Minaj shot a music video for the song on March 9, 2010, in Los Angeles with director TAJ. The single reached number eight on the Hot R&B/Hip-Hop Songs chart and number 40 on the Billboard Hot 100. It also peaked at number 109 on the UK Singles Chart.

The album's third single, "OMG", featuring will.i.am, reached number one on the Billboard Hot 100. It also reached number one in Ireland, New Zealand, the United Kingdom, and Australia. The song became his ninth number-one hit in the US, making him the first 2010s artist to collect number-one singles in three consecutive decades, and only the fourth artist of all-time to achieve the feat. Usher also became the third artist ever to have at least one Hot 100 number-one hit from five consecutive studio albums. The single stayed at number one on the chart for four weeks, including three consecutive. It finished at the top of the year-end Billboard charts. It was also named the fifth best-selling song of 2010, selling 3.8 million units, and was certified eight-times Platinum by RIAA.

"There Goes My Baby", which was released as the second promotional single prior to the album's release, was released to airplay as the album's fourth single in the United States on June 15, 2010. It reached number twenty-five on the Billboard Hot 100, and number one on the Hot R&B/Hip-Hop Songs chart, becoming Usher's eleventh number-one hit on the latter. The song earned Usher a Grammy Award for Best Male R&B Vocal Performance, at the 53rd Grammy Awards in 2011. "More" was released as the album's fifth and final single, on December 6, 2010. "More" peaked at number 15 on the Billboard Hot 100. The single reached number one in Canada. It also reached the top-ten in Australia, Belgium, and Norway, and the top-twenty in Denmark, France, New Zealand, and Sweden.

== Release and promotion ==
In November 2009, a representative of Usher told MTV News that the album will not be released on December 21, 2009, as scheduled: "The release of Usher's next album, Raymond v. Raymond, has been delayed because we believe that the album is so strong that we want to give it the opportunity to have the proper setup before coming out". The album's release was pushed back again due to Usher experiencing issues in obtaining management, following him parting ways with his then manager, Jonetta Patton, also his mother, in late November 2009. Patton had severed management ties with Usher due to his relationship with former Def Jam executive Grace Miguel, and she felt "if she didn't end things when she did, it would permanently affect their personal relationship." Raymond v. Raymond was ultimately released on March 30, 2010, in the United States, and released on April 26, 2010, in the United Kingdom.

Versus was announced as a follow-up to Raymond v. Raymond on July 8, 2010, and is Usher's first extended play. Described during a press release as "the last chapter of Raymond v. Raymond", Usher stated that the EP will explore the subjects of being newly single and a father. It would include Raymond v. Raymond single "There Goes My Baby", as well as 8 new tracks. Several producers from the latter album contributed to the production of the EP, including Polow da Don, Jim Jonsin, Rico Love, Drumma Boy, Jimmy Jam and Terry Lewis, Tha Cornaboyz and Max Martin. Versus' track listing and album cover was revealed on July 21, 2010. Despite some criticism towards its pop-oriented material, the EP received generally positive reviews from most music critics. It went on to sell 302,000 copies in the US.

=== Tour ===
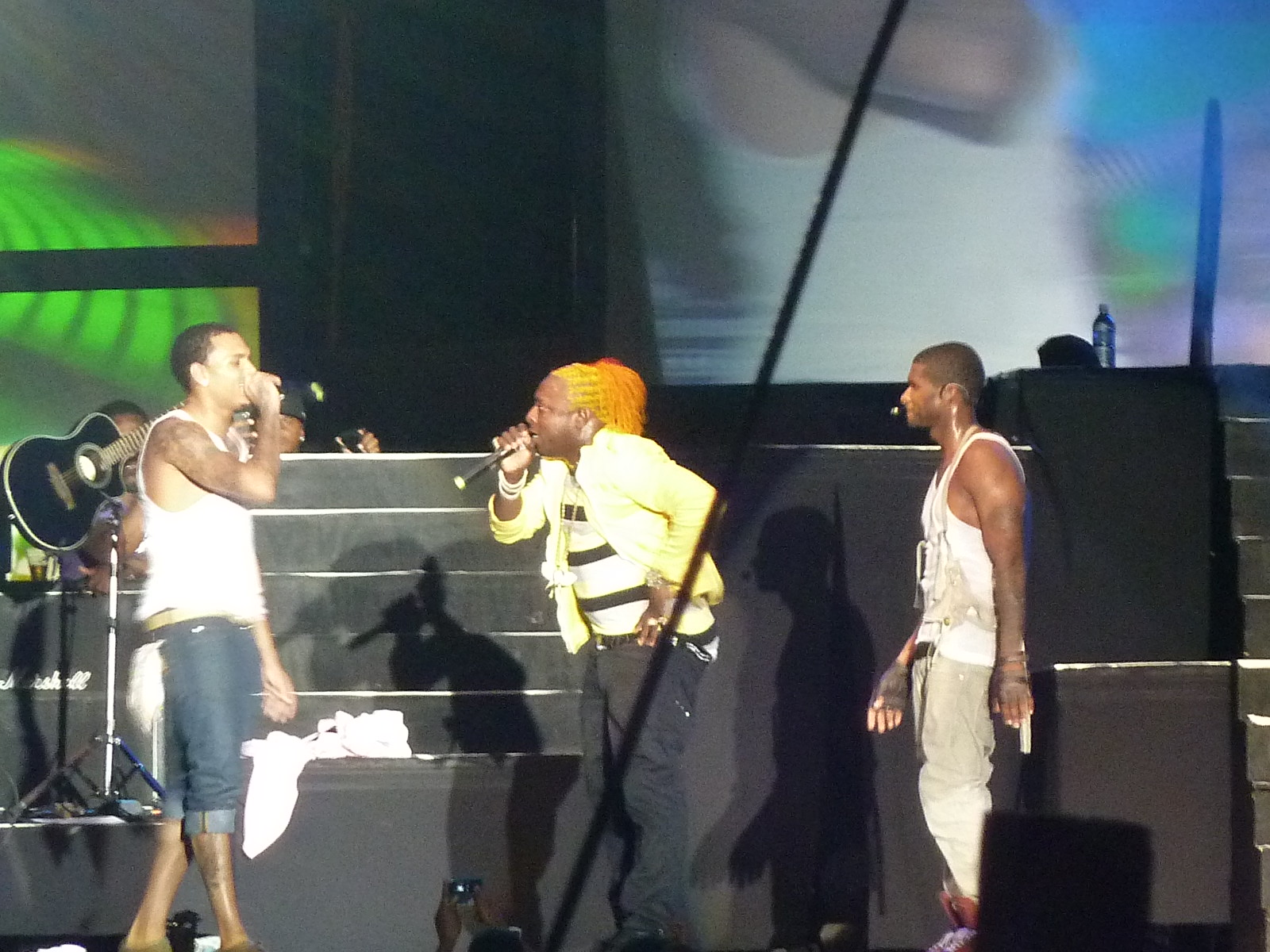
Usher with Chris Brown and Elephant Man at the Reggae Sumfest in 2010

In 2010, Usher competed in a dance battle against fellow R&B artist Chris Brown at the Reggae Sumfest. The battle sparked an Internet rumor of the two possibly going on tour. This was further pushed by producer Jermaine Dupri alluding that the two artist may be unaware of this upcoming tour. The singers later took to Twitter to ask who the fans would like to see them perform with. On September 8, 2010, the singer announced his touring trek (and revealed it was solo) for North America. Due to demand, many additional stops in Europe and Australasia were added. It was Usher's first arena tour in six years; his last being his 2004 effort, The Truth Tour. The then announced OMG Tour commenced on November 10, 2010, and concluded on June 1, 2011, with Usher performing in a total of 92 shows. In its conclusion, the tour placed seventh on Billboard's annual "Top 25 Tours", earning nearly $75 million.

== Critical reception ==
Professional ratings
Aggregate scores
Source	Rating
Metacritic	57/100
Review scores
Source	Rating
AllMusic	2.5/5 stars
Chicago Tribune	2.5/4 stars
Entertainment Weekly	B−
The Guardian	2/5 stars
Los Angeles Times	3/4 stars
NME	6/10
PopMatters	4/10
Rolling Stone	3/5 stars
Slant Magazine	1.5/5 stars
Sputnikmusic	2.5/5

Raymond v. Raymond received generally mixed reviews from music critics. At Metacritic, which assigns a normalized rating out of 100 to reviews from mainstream critics, the album has received an average score of 57, based on 16 reviews, which indicates "generally mixed or average reviews". AllMusic editor Andy Kellman was ambivalent towards its lyrical content and stated, "Many of the songs on the album have to be taken on their own, stripped of context; otherwise, determining what applies to Usher's real and fantasy lives can be problematic". Tyler Fisher of Sputnikmusic found the album thematically inconsistent and called it "a predictably unfocused album". Matthew Cole of Slant Magazine called it "consistently uninspired, with each song showcasing an incredibly gifted performer grown wearyingly complacent".

Camilla Pia of NME observed "quite a bit of forgettable bravado babble". Chicago Tribune writer Greg Kot viewed that its "songs about 'So Many Girls' and the burden of being a 'Pro Lover' on the prowl" inversely affect the mature-themed songs, writing "It's the kind of lacerating perspective that adulthood brings, but Usher's too busy chasing his past to fully embrace it". Tyler Lewis of PopMatters called Raymond v. Raymond a "cynically commercial and desperate album" and viewed it as a "pale imitation" of Usher's Confessions. The Village Voice's Rich Juzwiak called its confessional nature "wan" and compared its songs negatively to "pick-up lines: Their immediate success varies, but none are particularly memorable".

In a positive review, Mikael Wood of the Los Angeles Times felt that the album emphasizes "the wily lothario of yore" in response to "Usher fans disappointed by the change in direction his wedding inspired". Andrew Rennie of Now wrote, "his sixth album proves that his ability to make grown-up hits is stronger than ever." Billboard's Gail Mitchell called it "a more cohesive collection" than Here I Stand, "centered on the different sides that comprise the artist".

=== Accolades ===
The album earned Usher three American Music Award nominations. He won two of the awards for Favorite R&B Album and Favorite Soul/R&B Male Artist. The album also earned him four Soul Train Music Award nominations; including, Best R&B/Soul Artist Male, Song of the Year, Album of the Year, and Best Dance Performance. Usher tied Alicia Keys for the most Soul Train Music Award nominations that year. He won two of the nominations for Best Male R&B/Soul Artist and Album of the Year award. At the 53rd Grammy Awards in 2011, Raymond v. Raymond won both its nominations for Best Contemporary R&B Album and Best Male R&B Vocal Performance. Usher won a NRJ Music Award for International Male Artist of the Year.

Usher appeared on several Billboard year-end charts in 2010; he was ranked as the third top US Billboard Hot 100 artist. He was placed as the top R&B/Hip Hop Artist, the sixth top overall artist, and the ninth top Pop artist. The following year, Usher won three Billboard Music Awards, receiving honors as Top R&B Artist, Top R&B Album for Raymond v. Raymond, and Top R&B Song for "OMG".

== Commercial performance ==
The album debuted at number one on the US Billboard 200 chart with first-week sales of 329,107 copies, becoming Usher's third consecutive US number-one album. Its first week sales, at the time of its release, served as the third-largest one-week sales of 2010 in the US. According to Billboard, the album's first-week sales had been supported by his appearances on the television shows American Idol and The Ellen DeGeneres Show, both of which featured him performing the single "OMG". The album sold over 92,000 copies in the US in its second week of release. It sold over 64,000 copies in its third week of release. It then sold 52,000 copies in its fourth week of release. In its fifth week of release it sold 48,000 copies. In its sixth week of release sales increased with 51,000 copies sold. By March 2012, it has sold over 1.3 million copies in the US. On June 17, 2010, Raymond v. Raymond was certified platinum by the Recording Industry Association of America (RIAA). The album topped the US Top R&B/Hip-Hop Albums chart for seven consecutive weeks. It was placed as one of the ten best selling albums of 2010, ranking at number nine, selling 1.18 million copies that year.

The album debuted at number four in Canada, and has been certified platinum by the Canadian Recording Industry Association (CRIA), for shipments of 80,000 copies. Raymond v. Raymond debuted at number two in the United Kingdom, with English rapper Plan B's The Defamation of Strickland Banks debuting at number one. The latter album opened with 41,001 copies sold with Raymond v. Raymond opening with 40,788 units. Its first week figures are lower than Usher's three preceding albums. Raymond v. Raymond reached number-two in Australia and the album has been certified platinum by the Australian Record Industry Association (ARIA). The album is also certified platinum in the United Kingdom by the British Phonographic Industry (BPI). It also entered within the top-ten of charts in several other countries. The album's tracks and ring tones have sold more than seven million combined units, and by December 1, 2010, the album itself had sold over 2 million copies worldwide.

== Legacy ==
Web publication Rated R&B celebrated Raymond v. Raymond's tenth anniversary by ranking the six singles from the album. The editor, Danielle Brissett, wrote about the state of Usher's career at the time and how Raymond v. Raymond was seen as a major comeback, after his previous studio album, Here I Stand, was seen as an "unexpected fall from grace" after the blockbuster success of Confessions. With Raymond v. Raymond Usher returned to form, as he "gave fans what they wanted and returned to his ladies’ man persona but with a seasoned approach". The album was the ninth best-selling album of 2010 in the US with 1.18 million copies sold, and the Hot 100 number 1 smash "OMG" featuring will.i.am. became the fifth best-selling digital single of the year and ranked 60th on Billboard's Hot 100 Songs of the Decade list. The editor goes on, saying that while Usher had been in the industry with a career spanning three decades, "[he] made it clear that he hadn't lost his sly, yet irresistible euphonic charm" as "he led Billboard's year-end tally in 2010 as the top R&B male performer".

Not only was Raymond v. Raymond a commercial comeback for the singer in 2010 - with each single peaking within the top 40 on the Billboard Hot 100 and the OMG Tour becoming his highest-grossing concert tour to date - but it extended his reign as "the biggest male pop star in the world".

Raymond v. Raymond was ranked 113th on the Decade-End Billboard 200 chart. "OMG" became the only song by a male R&B artist to reach the top spot on the Billboard Hot 100, and "DJ Got Us Fallin' In Love" made Raymond v. Raymond the only R&B album with multiple singles to reach the top 5 of the Billboard Hot 100 that decade. The album also had one of the highest first week sales for any male R&B album of the 2010s decade at 329,000 in the US, and is one of the best-selling albums of the decade by any black artist at 5 million sold worldwide. Raymond v. Raymond was not only Usher's most successful album in the 2010s, but one of the most successful R&B albums that decade.

== Track listing ==
No.	Title	Writer(s)	Producer(s)	Length
1.	"Monstar"	Usher Raymond IV; James Harris III; Terry Lewis; Bobby Ross Avila; Issiah J. Avila; Miguel Pimentel; Juan Najera	Jimmy Jam & Terry Lewis	5:01
2.	"Hey Daddy (Daddy's Home)"	Raymond; Richard Butler, Jr.; Andrew Harr; Jermaine Jackson; Algernod Washington	The Runners; Rico Love	3:44
3.	"There Goes My Baby"	Butler; James Scheffer; Frank Romano; Danny Morris	Jim Jonsin; Rico Love	4:41
4.	"Lil Freak" (featuring Nicki Minaj)	Raymond; Elvis Williams; Jamal Jones; Esther Dean; Onika Maraj; Stevie Wonder	Polow da Don	3:54
5.	"She Don't Know" (featuring Ludacris)	Raymond; Sean Garrett; Shondrae Crawford; Christopher Bridges; Ebo Taylor	Bangladesh; Garrett	4:03
6.	"OMG" (featuring will.i.am)	William Adams	will.i.am	4:29
7.	"Mars vs. Venus"	Raymond; Harris; Lewis; B. Avila; I. Avila	Jimmy Jam & Terry Lewis	4:22
8.	"Pro Lover"	Raymond; Harris; Lewis; B. Avila; I. Avila; Pimentel	Jimmy Jam & Terry Lewis	5:02
9.	"Foolin' Around"	Raymond; Jermaine Dupri; Bryan-Michael Cox; Johntá Austin	Cox; Dupri	4:11
10.	"Papers"	Raymond; Garrett; Xavier Dotson; Alonzo Mathis	Zaytoven; Garrett	4:21
11.	"So Many Girls"	Raymond; Butler; Nathaniel Hills; Marcella Araica	Danja	4:36
12.	"Guilty" (featuring T.I.)	Raymond; Alexander Parhm Jr.; Dean; Keith Thomas; Clifford Harris, Jr.	Prettyboifresh	3:44
13.	"Okay"	James "JLack" Lackey; Ryon Lovett	Lackey	3:15
14.	"Making Love (Into the Night)"	Butler; Scheffer; Daniel Morris; Benny Mardones; Robert Tepper	Jonsin; Rico Love	3:36
Total length:				58:59

iTunes Store and Japan bonus track
No.	Title	Writer(s)	Producer(s)	Length
15.	"More"	Bilal Hajji; Khayat; Charles Hinshaw Jr.; Raymond	RedOne	3:49
Total length:				62:49

Target, Best Buy, and United Kingdom bonus track
No.	Title	Writer(s)	Producer(s)	Length
15.	"Hey Daddy (Daddy's Home) (Remix)" (featuring Plies)	Raymond; Harr; Jackson; Butler; Algernod Washington	The Runners; Rico Love	4:16

Australia bonus track
No.	Title	Writer(s)	Producer(s)	Length
15.	"DJ Got Us Fallin' in Love" (featuring Pitbull)	Martin Sandberg; Karl Schuster; Savan Kotecha; Armando Perez	Max Martin	3:40
Total length:				62:40

Deluxe edition (bonus tracks)
No.	Title	Writer(s)	Producer(s)	Length
15.	"Love 'Em All"	Dean; Raymond; Thomas; Parhm; Aubry Delaine; Jeremy Stevenson	Prettyboifresh	3:48
16.	"DJ Got Us Fallin' in Love" (featuring Pitbull)	Martin Sandberg; Karl Schuster; Savan Kotecha; Armando Perez	Max Martin	3:40
17.	"Hot Tottie" (featuring Jay-Z)	Raymond; Dean; Shawn Carter; Jones; Paul Dawson	Polow da Don	4:59
18.	"Lay You Down"	Butler, Jr.; Raymond; Dwayne Nesmith	Rico Love Dwayne Nesmith	4:03
19.	"Lingerie"	Raymond; Harris; Lewis; B. Avila; I. Avila	Jimmy Jam & Terry Lewis	4:13
20.	"Get in My Car" (featuring Bun B)	Raymond; Jones; Bernard Freeman; Dean	Polow da Don	4:09
21.	"Somebody to Love (Remix)" (Justin Bieber featuring Usher)	Jonathan Yip; Jeremy Reeves; Ray Romulus; Heather Bright	The Stereotypes	3:28
22.	"Stranger"	Lovett; Raymond; Christopher Gholson	Drumma Boy	4:47
Total length:				96:10

United Kingdom Deluxe edition bonus tracks
No.	Title	Writer(s)	Producer(s)	Length
23.	"Dirty Dancer" (with Enrique Iglesias featuring Lil Wayne)	Enrique Miguel Iglesias Preysler; Khayat; Evan Bogart; Erika Nuri; David Quiñones	RedOne	3:35
24.	"More"	Hajji; Khayat; Hinshaw, Jr.; Raymond	RedOne	3:49

Japan Deluxe edition bonus track
No.	Title	Writer(s)	Producer(s)	Length
23.	"Dirty Dancer" (with Enrique Iglesias featuring Lil Wayne)	Iglesias Preysler; Khayat; Bogart; Nuri; Quiñones	RedOne	3:35
24.	"OMG" (Disco Fries Radio Mix)	William Adams	will.i.am	4:44
Total length:				104:15

Notes

- "So Many Girls" features additional vocals by Diddy.

Sample credits

- "Get in My Car" samples Leon Russell and Marc Benno's song "Mr. Henri the Clown".
- "Lil Freak" samples Stevie Wonder's 1973 "Living for the City".
- "Making Love (Into the Night)" contains a portion of composition from Benny Mardones' 1980 "Into The Night".
- "She Don't Know" samples Ebo Taylor's 1977 "Heaven".

== Personnel ==
Credits for Raymond v. Raymond adapted from AllMusic.

- Kory Aaron – assistant
- Marcella Araica – engineer
- Alex Barajas – assistant
- Tom Coyne – mastering
- Ian Cross – engineer, mixing, vocal engineer
- Aubry "Big Juice" Delaine – engineer
- Dylan "3-D" Dresdow – mixing
- Jermaine Dupri – mixing
- Joe Gallagher – assistant
- Conor Gilligan – assistant
- Melvin "Melomuzic" Parker – piano
- Matty Green – assistant
- Blake Harden – assistant
- Kemal Harris – stylist
- Patrick Hewlett – assistant
- Gordon Hogan – assistant
- Sam Holland – assistant
- John Horesco IV – engineer
- Bob Horn – mixing
- Jaycen Joshua – mixing
- Damien Lewis – assistant
- Giancarlo Lino – assistant
- Erik Madrid – assistant
- Michael Makowski – assistant
- Anthony Mandler – photography
- Rob Marks – engineer
- Frank Romano – guitar
- Matt Marrin – engineer, mixing
- Manny Marroquin – mixing
- Thurston McCrea – assistant
- Andrew Mezzi – assistant
- Brandon Middleton – assistant
- Vernon Mungo – engineer
- Brandon Parks – assistant
- Nicole Patterson – make-up
- Jonetta Patton – artist development
- Karl Peterson – assistant
- Mark Pitts – executive producer, A&R
- Shawn Porter – groomer
- Usher Raymond – executive producer
- Rob Skipworth – engineer
- Tim Sonnefeld – mixing
- Brian Stanley – mixing
- Mark "Spike" Stent – mixing
- Jay Stevenson – engineer
- Phil Tan – mixing
- Matt Taylor – art direction, design
- Miles Walker – engineer
- Jason Wilkie – assistant
- will.i.am – engineer
- Tre Williams – engineer
- James Wisner – engineer
- Lauren Evans – background vocals

== Charts ==
=== Weekly charts ===
Chart (2010)	Peak position
Australian Albums (ARIA)	2
Australian Urban Albums (ARIA)	1
Austrian Albums (Ö3 Austria)	68
Belgian Albums (Ultratop Flanders)	43
Belgian Albums (Ultratop Wallonia)	67
Canadian Albums (Billboard)	4
Dutch Albums (Album Top 100)	34
French Albums (SNEP)	32
German Albums (Offizielle Top 100)	47
Greek Albums (IFPI)	4
Irish Albums (IRMA)	17
Japanese Albums (Oricon)	12
New Zealand Albums Chart	8
Scottish Albums (Official Charts)	8
Swiss Albums (Schweizer Hitparade)	20
Taiwanese Albums (RIT)	8
UK Albums (Official Charts)	2
UK R&B Albums (Official Charts)	2
US Billboard 200	1
US Top R&B/Hip-Hop Albums (Billboard)	1

=== Year-end charts ===
Chart (2010)	Position
Australian Albums (ARIA)	22
Australian Urban Albums (ARIA)	3
UK Albums (OCC)	62
US Billboard 200	18
US Top R&B/Hip Hop Albums (Billboard)	1
Chart (2011)	Position
Australian Albums (ARIA)	97
Australian Urban Albums (ARIA)	22
US Top R&B/Hip Hop Albums (Billboard)	58

=== Decade-end charts ===
Chart (2010–2019)	Position
US Billboard 200	113

== Certifications ==
Region	Certification	Certified units/sales
Australia (ARIA)	Platinum	70,000^{^}
Canada (Music Canada)	Platinum	80,000^{^}
Denmark (IFPI Danmark)	Gold	10,000^{‡}
New Zealand (RMNZ)	3× Platinum	45,000^{‡}
United Kingdom (BPI)	Platinum	300,000^{‡}
United States (RIAA)	3× Platinum	3,000,000^{‡}
^{^} Shipments figures based on certification alone.^{‡} Sales+streaming figures based on certification alone.

== Release history ==
Region	Date	Label	Edition
Germany	March 26, 2010	Arista Records	Standard
United States	March 30, 2010	LaFace Records	Standard
United States	August 24, 2010	LaFace Records	Deluxe
Canada	March 30, 2010	LaFace Records	Standard
Canada	August 24, 2010	Sony Music Entertainment	Deluxe
Brazil	April 15, 2010	Sony Music Entertainment	Standard
Japan	April 21, 2010	Sony Music Entertainment	Standard
United Kingdom	April 26, 2010	RCA Records	Standard
United Kingdom	September 20, 2010	RCA Records	Deluxe
Japan	September 22, 2010	Sony Music Entertainment	Deluxe

== See also ==
- List of number-one albums of 2010 (U.S.)
- List of number-one R&B albums of 2010 (U.S.)
