= DJ Got Us Fallin' in Love =

Single by Usher featuring Pitbull

from the EP Versus
- B-side: "Lil Freak" (Mig & Rizzo Extended Mix)
- Released: July 12, 2010
- Recorded: 2009
- Studio: Maratone (Stockholm); Conway Recording (Los Angeles); Al Burna's Crib (Miami)
- Genre: EDM; Europop; dance-pop; electropop
- Length: 3:41
- Label: LaFace; Jive
- Songwriters: Max Martin; Shellback; Savan Kotecha; Armando Pérez
- Producers: Max Martin; Shellback

Usher singles chronology
"Somebody to Love" (remix) (2010)	"DJ Got Us Fallin' in Love" (2010)	"Hot Tottie" (2010)

Pitbull singles chronology
"I Like It" (2010)	"DJ Got Us Fallin' in Love" (2010)	"Bon, Bon" (2010)

Music video
- "DJ Got Us Fallin' In Love" on YouTube

"DJ Got Us Fallin' in Love" is a song by American singer Usher featuring American rapper Pitbull, who wrote the song with Savan Kotecha and producers Shellback and Max Martin. It was originally intended for Rihanna's 2010 album Loud, but her team turned it down. It was released to digital download on July 12, 2010, and sent to radio the next day, as the first single from Usher's EP, Versus, which is an extension of his sixth studio album, Raymond v. Raymond. An electronic dance track with a Europop style (though the track was recorded in the United States), the song puts emphasis on its chorus and follows the chord progression of Gm-F-E♭. It received mixed to positive reviews from critics, who favored its production and Usher's vocals, but were divided on Pitbull's rap verse and criticized the song's lack of originality.

"DJ Got Us Fallin' in Love" peaked in the top ten in over fifteen countries, becoming one of Usher's most successful singles. It reached the top-three on the Japan Hot 100, Canadian Hot 100, Hungary Singles Chart, French Singles Chart, and ARIA Singles Chart. It peaked at number four on the Billboard Hot 100, marking Usher's sixteenth top-ten hit on the chart. It received a 6× Platinum certification from the ARIA and a 2× Platinum certification from Canadian Recording Industry Association (CRIA). An accompanying music video, directed by Hiro Murai, shows Usher krumping and crip walking in a club.

== Background and composition ==
"DJ Got Us Fallin' in Love" was leaked on the internet on July 1, 2010, with its follow-up single "Hot Tottie" leaked later that month. The song was released from Versus as the EP's mainstream single, whereas the latter track was released as the urban single. "DJ Got Us Fallin' in Love" features guest vocals by American rapper Pitbull, who co-wrote it with Savan Kotecha, Max Martin and Shellback, with production handled by the latter two. It was recorded at Maratone Studios, Stockholm, Sweden and at Conway Studios, Los Angeles, California, handled by Sam Holland and Emily Wright. Mixing was done by Serban Ghenea at MixStar Studios. "DJ Got Us Fallin' in Love" runs for a duration of three minutes and forty seconds. This is the first of two songs that Kotecha, Martin, and Shellback have co-written for Usher, who would later join the three in co-writing his 2012 single "Scream".

"DJ Got Us Fallin' in Love"
The chorus of the song, leading to the opening of Pitbull's verse.

According to the sheet music published at Musicnotes.com by Sony/ATV Music Publishing, "DJ Got Us Fallin' in Love" is written in the key of G Minor and has a tempo of 120 beats per minute. It follows the chord progression of Gm-F-E♭, and Usher's vocal range spans from the low note of G_{4} to the high note of B♭_{5}. The song is described as a club track, that contains Europop and electronic dance influences. Bill Lamb of About.com noted that the song emphasizes its chorus, to which Usher sings "with appropriate passion".

== Critical reception ==
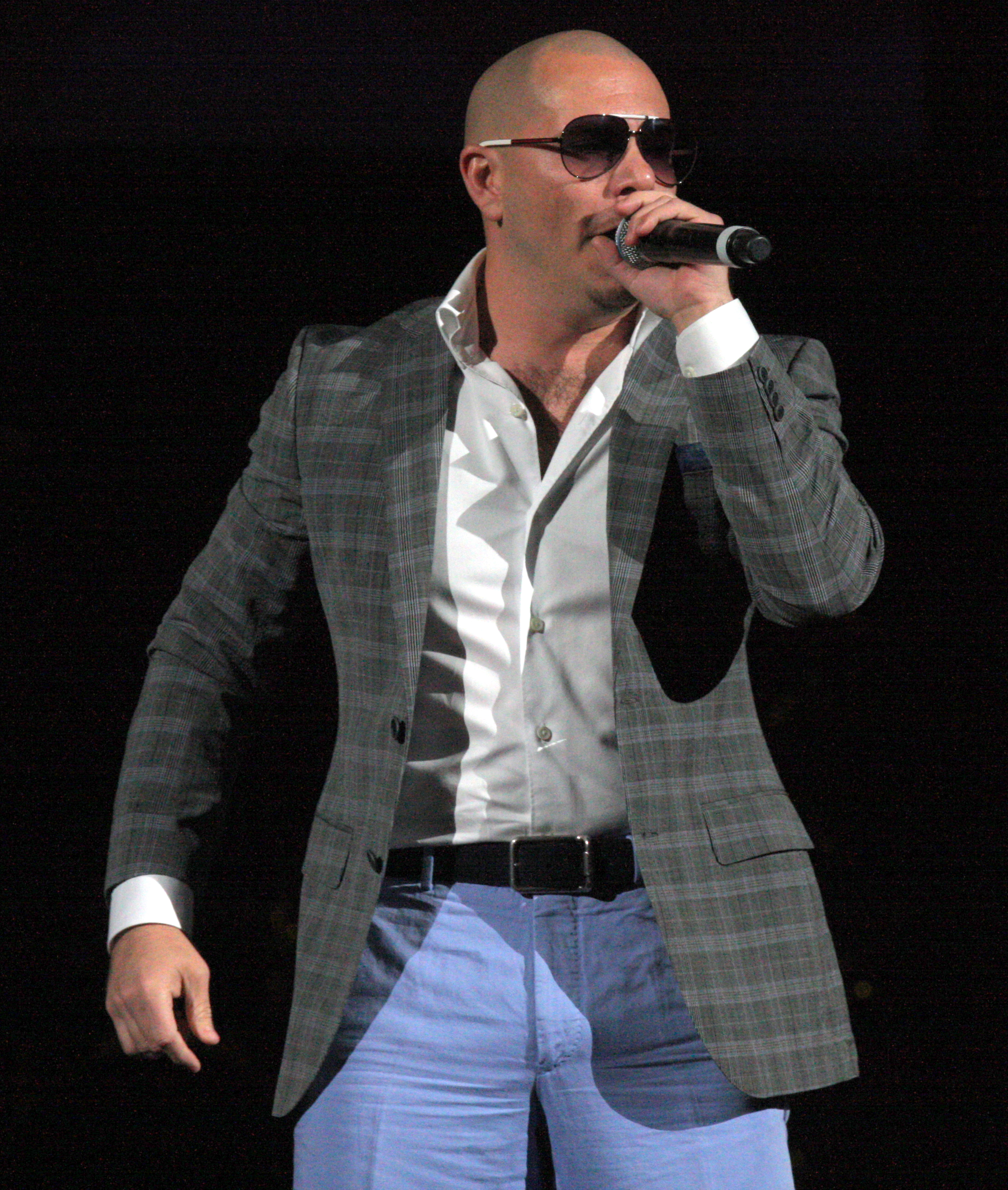
American rapper Pitbull's verse received mixed reception from critics.

The song received mixed to positive reviews from critics, with criticism directed mainly towards its lack of originality and were divided Pitbull's rap verse, though some did praise its production and Usher's vocal performance. AllMusic's Andy Kellman noted the song as a stand-out from Versus, along with "Hot Tottie" and "There Goes My Baby". Bill Lamb of About.com gave the song three-and-a-half stars out of five, praising Usher's vocal delivery and the song's "memorable chorus". Lamb criticized Pitbull's appearance, writing that his verse is "tossed on as a commercial gimmick", while also writing that the song doesn't compare well to Usher's "OMG" (2010). Billboard's Michael Menachem described Pitbull's verse as "energizing" and wrote that Usher's "high register fits seamlessly with dance beats". Despite citing the lyrics as repetitive, he thought that the song "should keep clubgoers moving for months to come".

Sarah Rodman of Boston Globe depicted the song as a "dance thumper" and invites listeners to "lose themselves in the music". Los Angeles Times' Jeff Weiss viewed the song as "generic" with Usher "singing generic paeans to a paramour's eyes over a Eurovision-like Max Martin production". Eric Henderson of Slant Magazine disapproved of the track as a whole, writing "'DJ Got Us Fallin' In Love' is, while indistinguishable from any other overdriving club banger, one of the only songs in which Usher Raymond acknowledges an aphrodisiac more powerful than his own ab musk".

== Commercial performance ==
In the United States, the song debuted at number nineteen on the Billboard Hot 100 on the week ending December 21, 2010. It became Usher's second top-20 debut of 2010, after "OMG" opened at number fourteen in April. On the week ending December 24, 2010, "DJ Got Us Fallin' in Love" was positioned at number five. It was the first time that Usher—as a lead artist—had four singles on the top-40 of the Hot 100 simultaneously, with "OMG" at number twenty, "There Goes My Baby" at thirty-three, and "Hot Tottie" at twenty-five. "DJ Got Us Fallin' in Love" remained on the Hot 100 for thirty weeks before dropping out, and peaked at number four, becoming Usher's sixteenth top-ten hit. The song peaked at number two on the Pop Songs Chart, and twelve on the Adult Pop Songs Chart. On the Hot 100 year-end charts for 2010 and 2011, it reached number twenty-two and sixty-five, respectively.

"DJ Got Us Fallin' in Love" peaked at number two on the Canadian Hot 100 chart, and was certified two-times Platinum by the Canadian Recording Industry Association (CRIA), for shipments of over 160,000 copies. It peaked at number three on the Australian Singles Charts, and received a six-times Platinum certification by the Australian Recording Industry Association (ARIA). The song reached number four on the New Zealand Singles Chart, and was certified four-times Platinum by the Recorded Music New Zealand (RMNZ). "DJ Got Us Fallin' in Love" was certified Platinum in the regions of México and Switzerland by the AMPROFON and IFPI, respectively. The song achieved success in Europe, peaking at number three on the European Hot 100. Internationally, "DJ Got Us Fallin' in Love" reached the top-ten in over fifteen countries, becoming one of Usher's most successful singles. It peaked in the top five in Japan, Hungary, France, Switzerland, Germany and Austria.

By February 2011, the song had reached 3 million in digital sales, according to Nielsen SoundScan, making it the second single of 2010 for both Usher and Pitbull to achieve the figure (Usher's "OMG" sold 3,957,000 copies, while "I Like It" performed by lead artist Enrique Iglesias sold 3,197,000). It reached its 4 million sales mark in the US in April 2013. As of June 2014, the song has sold 4,198,000 copies in the US.

== Music video ==
Usher and two female dancers performing choreography to the song's second verse, with a large window as a backdrop

The music video for the song premiered on August 25, 2010, on Vevo, and was directed by Hiro Murai. The video begins in a club environment, with misplaced furniture and a shattered glass bottle. The scene goes in reverse motion, people instantly appear, frozen in a raving action. As the scene is still reversing, a DJ is spinning his booth, and the shattered glass bottle forms into its original state. The clubbers and the scene then start to move forward, but in slow motion, and the song begins with Usher approaching from a set of stairs. Usher sings and dances, while moving past clubbers who are still moving in slow motion, while he is moving normally. Once the chorus comes in, the clubbers begin dancing and raving in normal motion, periodically slowing down; Usher is krumping past them, moving on to the next scene. Usher slides into a room with a large lit-up window as a backdrop. He performs choreography backed up by female dancers for the second verse, and then returns to the original room with the second chorus coming in. A similar scene is involved in the first chorus, but this time Usher is dancing with the clubbers, who are still alternating in motion speed. Pitbull then begins his verse, and is sitting in a V.I.P. area with three females, with the camera alternating between him, the clubbers, and Usher. The video ends with its final scene, in a dance off, with Usher dancing adjacent to some of the clubbers. Once the climax of the chorus comes in, Usher jumps in the air and starts freely dancing along with the clubbers, with everyone in the same motion speed; Usher is primarily crip-walking. Usher and the clubbers then perform a final organized choreography, mainly krumping, and the video ends.

The music video on YouTube has received over 450 million views as of Sep 2026.

== Live performances ==
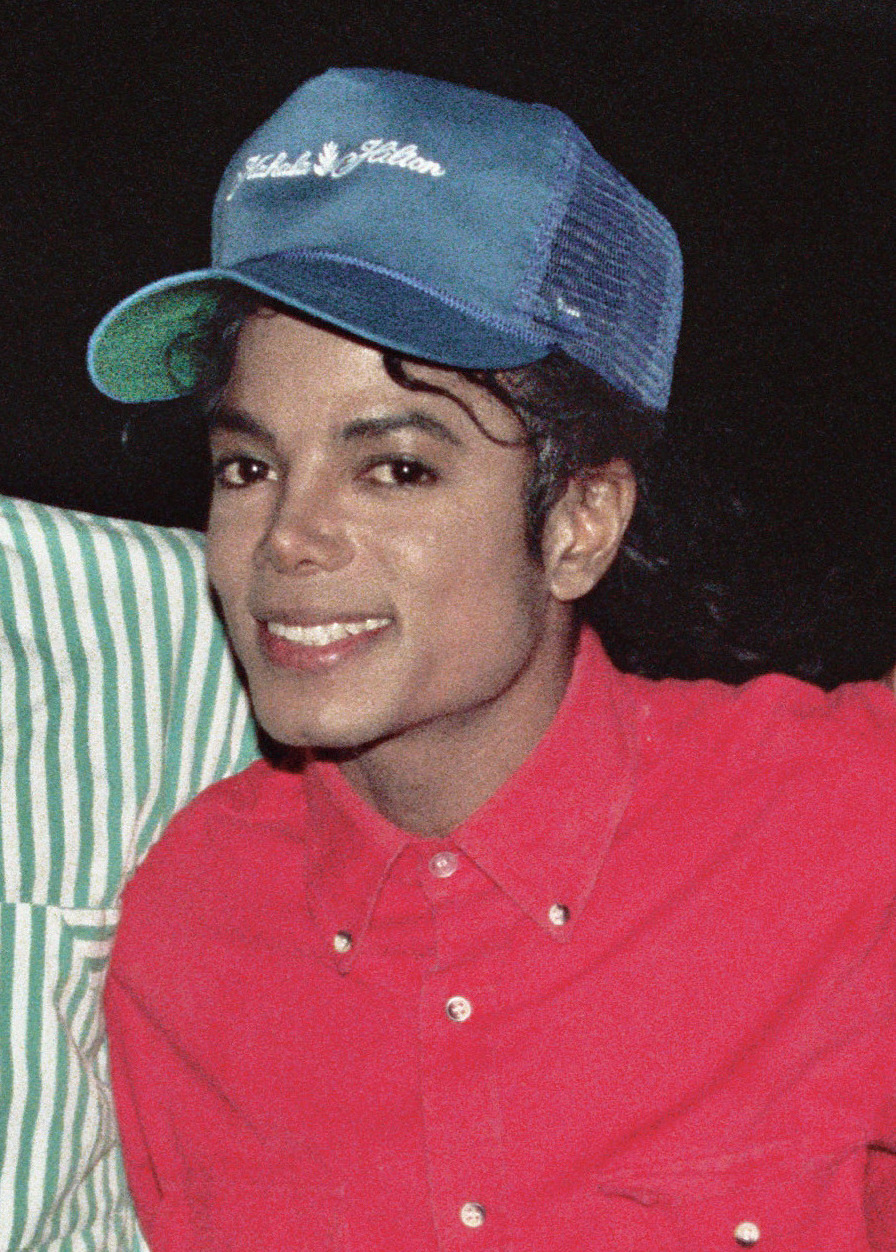
Critics compared Usher's dancing during his performance in the 2010 MTV Video Music Awards to Michael Jackson's.

Usher first performed "DJ Got Us Fallin' in Love" on Good Morning America, alongside "OMG". A few days later, Usher performed the song on The Ellen DeGeneres Show. On December 17, 2010, he performed the song alongside "There Goes My Baby" on Jimmy Kimmel Live!. Usher performed "DJ Got Us Fallin' in Love" in the season five finale of America's Got Talent, and in the seventh season of The X Factor. He performed the song during his OMG Tour, alongside several other tracks. The song was performed with "OMG" during the 2010 MTV Video Music Awards. VMA executive producer Dave Sirulnick told MTV News, "We said to him, 'We want to do the best televised dance routine that you've done in years. Let's show why you're the king.'" MTV Buzzworthy writer, Tamar Antai was present at the rehearsal for the show, and commented that the VMA crew was about to "pull off visual feats not just previously unseen and unparalleled at the VMAs, but unseen and unparalleled on TV."

The performance was received with critical acclaim. On Usher specifically, Antai said the performance was like "liquid magic", saying, "He took it to the level that comes after the next level. The penthouse level." He was aided by about a dozen background dancers, the males in skeleton-like costumes, and the females donning a one-piece, gloves, and boots. The "OMG" performance was accompanied by red laser lights, making an illusion as if the stage disappeared. The lights spelled out "O.M.G" as well as "Usher", as dancers lowered from the ceiling. Jayson Rodriguez of MTV News commented, "The singer moved and grooved, proving that he's the R&B star that everyone pays attention to for the big moments." Rochell D. Thomas, also of the site, said, "Call it what you will: talent, swag, skills...When he steps on the dance floor, some mysterious thing comes out of him and puts the G in groove." Thomas went on to say that Usher's dance moves would make "the late great Michael Jackson jealous" in the stage production "that included more special-effects bells and whistles than a summer blockbuster." Chris Ryan of MTV Buzzworthy also compared the performance to Jackson, calling it overall, "One part "Tron," one part laser show, one part Michael Jackson choreo tribute, and all spectacle."

== Legacy ==
In 2011, YouTuber CaptainSparklez released a parody of the song with Minecraft-themed lyrics titled "Revenge", which became the most-viewed Minecraft video of all time on YouTube, accumulating 175 million views as of 2019.

In 2014, Canadian rock musician Devin Townsend interpolated the chorus of "DJ Got Us Fallin' in Love" in his song "Sky Blue" from the Z² album.

In 2026, the Australian indie rock band Radio Free Alice called the song the "ugliest duckling of bad songs" before covering it for Triple J's Like a Version series. The band later apologized for the offense that their comments "could have caused to Black artists and other communities."

== Track listings ==
Digital download

1. "DJ Got Us Fallin' in Love" – 3:42

German CD Single

1. "DJ Got Us Fallin' in Love" – 3:42
2. "More" – 3:49

Australian CD and digital Single

1. "DJ Got Us Fallin' in Love" – 3:42
2. "Lil Freak" (Mig & Rizzo Extended Mix) – 5:36

Australian digital remixes No longer available to purchase in iTunes Australian store

1. "DJ Got Us Fallin' in Love" – 3:42
2. "DJ Got Us Fallin' in Love" (Almighty 12 Inch Mix) – 7:41
3. "DJ Got Us Fallin' in Love" (Almighty Radio Mix) – 3:38
4. "DJ Got Us Fallin' in Love" (Ad Brown Remix) – 7:36
5. "DJ Got Us Fallin' in Love" (2 Darc Drum 'n' Bass) – 2:37
6. "DJ Got Us Fallin' in Love" (2 Darc Funky House Remix) – 3:31
7. "DJ Got Us Fallin' in Love" (MK Ultras Mix) – 3:34

US CD single

1. "DJ Got Us Fallin' in Love" – 3:42
2. "OMG" (Cory Enemy Club Mix) – 5:55

US iTunes Remixes

1. "DJ Got Us Fallin' in Love" (HyperCrush Remix) – 4:05
2. "DJ Got Us Fallin' in Love" (Precize Club Mix) – 4:23
3. "DJ Got Us Fallin' in Love" (Precize Dub) – 4:23
4. "DJ Got Us Fallin' in Love" (Versatile Club Mix) – 5:54
5. "DJ Got Us Fallin' in Love" (Versatile Radio Mix) – 4:02
6. "DJ Got Us Fallin' in Love" (Versatile Dub) – 5:54
7. "DJ Got Us Fallin' in Love" (DJ Spider & Mr. Best Remix) – 6:07
8. "DJ Got Us Fallin' in Love" (Jump Smokers Radio Mix) – 4:05
9. "DJ Got Us Fallin' in Love" (Jump Smokers Club Mix) – 5:13
10. "DJ Got Us Fallin' in Love" (Dino Roc Radio Mix) – 3:53

== Personnel ==
Credits are adapted from the liner notes of Versus.

Recording locations

- Vocal recording – Maratone Studios, Stockholm, Sweden; Conway Recording Studios, Los Angeles, California; Al Burna's Crib, Miami, Florida
- Mixing – MixStar Studios, Los Angeles, California

Personnel

- Songwriting – Max Martin, Shellback, Savan Kotecha, Armando C. Pérez
- Production and instruments – Max Martin, Shellback
- Recording – Sam Holland, Emily Wright
- Pitbull vocal recording – Al Burna
- Mixing – Serban Ghenea
- Mix engineer – John Hanes
- Photography – Walid Azami
- Assistant mix engineer – Tim Roberts

== Charts ==
=== Weekly charts ===
Chart (2010–2011)	Peak position
Australia (ARIA)	3
Austria (Ö3 Austria Top 40)	5
Belgium (Ultratop 50 Flanders)	7
Belgium (Ultratop 50 Wallonia)	7
Canada Hot 100 (Billboard)	2
Canada CHR/Top 40 (Billboard)	2
CIS Airplay (TopHit)	97
Czech Republic Airplay (ČNS IFPI)	9
Denmark (Tracklisten)	18
Europe (Eurochart Hot 100)	3
Finland (Suomen virallinen lista)	8
France (SNEP)	3
Germany (GfK)	5
Germany Airplay (Nielsen)	13
Global Dance (Billboard)	5
Hungary (Rádiós Top 40)	3
Ireland (IRMA)	6
Japan Hot 100 (Billboard)	2
Mexico (Billboard Mexican Airplay)	3
Mexico Anglo (Monitor Latino)	4
Netherlands (Dutch Top 40)	5
Netherlands (Single Top 100)	9
New Zealand (Recorded Music NZ)	4
Norway (VG-lista)	9
Poland (Dance Top 50)	19
Russia Airplay (TopHit)	91
Scottish Singles Sales (Official Charts)	7
Spain (Promusicae)	11
Spain Airplay (Promusicae)	8
Sweden (Sverigetopplistan)	15
Switzerland (Schweizer Hitparade)	4
Ukraine Airplay (TopHit)	94
UK Hip Hop/R&B (Official Charts)	3
UK Singles (Official Charts)	7
US Billboard Hot 100	4
US Adult Contemporary (Billboard)	19
US Adult Pop Airplay (Billboard)	12
US Dance Club Songs (Billboard)	17
US Hot R&B/Hip-Hop Songs (Billboard)	51
US Hot Latin Songs (Billboard)	16
US Pop Airplay (Billboard)	2
US Rhythmic Airplay (Billboard)	1

Chart (2024–2026)	Peak position
Global 200 (Billboard)	185
Lithuania (AGATA)	65

=== Year-end charts ===
Chart (2010)	Position
Australia (ARIA)	10
Austria (Ö3 Austria Top 40)	52
Belgium (Ultratop 50 Flanders)	36
Belgium (Ultratop 50 Wallonia)	72
Brazil (Crowley)	98
Canada (Canadian Hot 100)	20
Europe (European Hot 100 Singles)	62
France (SNEP)	57
Germany (Official German Charts)	41
Hungary (Rádiós Top 40)	53
Netherlands (Dutch Top 40)	8
Netherlands (Single Top 100)	37
New Zealand (Recorded Music NZ)	22
Sweden (Sverigetopplistan)	48
Switzerland (Schweizer Hitparade)	35
UK Singles (OCC)	56
US Billboard Hot 100	22
US Mainstream Top 40 (Billboard)	17
US Rhythmic (Billboard)	12

Chart (2011)	Position
Canada (Canadian Hot 100)	46
France (SNEP)	78
Germany (Official German Charts)	98
Hungary (Rádiós Top 40)	83
Switzerland (Schweizer Hitparade)	72
US Billboard Hot 100	65
US Adult Contemporary (Billboard)	45

=== All-time charts ===
Chart	Position
US Mainstream Top 40 (Billboard)	62

== Certifications and sales ==
Region	Certification	Certified units/sales
Australia (ARIA)	6× Platinum	420,000^{‡}
Austria (IFPI Austria)	Gold	15,000^{*}
Belgium (BRMA)	Gold	15,000^{*}
Canada (Music Canada)	2× Platinum	160,000^{*}
Denmark (IFPI Danmark)	2× Platinum	180,000^{‡}
Germany (BVMI)	2× Platinum	600,000^{‡}
Italy (FIMI)	Gold	15,000^{‡}
Japan (RIAJ)	Gold	100,000^{*}
Mexico (AMPROFON)	Platinum	60,000^{*}
New Zealand (RMNZ)	4× Platinum	120,000^{‡}
South Korea	—	801,627
Spain (Promusicae)	Platinum	60,000^{‡}
Sweden (GLF)	Gold	20,000^{‡}
Switzerland (IFPI Switzerland)	Platinum	30,000^{^}
United Kingdom (BPI)	2× Platinum	1,200,000^{‡}
United States (RIAA)	8× Platinum	8,000,000^{‡}
^{*} Sales figures based on certification alone.^{^} Shipments figures based on certification alone.^{‡} Sales+streaming figures based on certification alone.

== Release history ==
Region	Date	Format	Label
Australia	July 12, 2010	Digital download	Jive Records
France	July 12, 2010	Digital download	Jive Records
Ireland	July 12, 2010	Digital download	Jive Records
Italy	July 12, 2010	Digital download	Jive Records
Netherlands	July 12, 2010	Digital download	Jive Records
New Zealand	July 12, 2010	Digital download	Jive Records
Spain	July 12, 2010	Digital download	Jive Records
Switzerland	July 12, 2010	Digital download	Jive Records
United Kingdom	July 12, 2010	Digital download	Jive Records
Denmark	July 12, 2010	Digital download	LaFace Records
Germany	July 12, 2010	CD single, digital download	LaFace Records
United States	July 12, 2010	CD single, digital download	LaFace Records
Sweden	July 12, 2010	Digital download	LaFace Records
United States	July 13, 2010	Contemporary hit radio	LaFace Records
Japan	August 18, 2010	Digital Download	LaFace Records

== See also ==
- Revenge (cover)
