= More (Usher song) =

2010 single by Usher

- Remixes cover

Single by Usher

from the album Raymond v. Raymond
- Released: November 22, 2010
- Recorded: 2009
- Studio: Henson Studios (Los Angeles, California); Metropolis Studios (London, England)
- Genre: Hi-NRG (RedOne Jimmy Joker mix)
- Length: 3:49 (album version); 3:40 (RedOne Jimmy Joker mix)
- Label: LaFace; Jive
- Songwriters: Bilal Hajji; Nadir Khayat; Charles Hinshaw Jr.; Usher Raymond
- Producers: RedOne; Jimmy Joker

Usher singles chronology
"Lay You Down" (2010)	"More" (2010)	"Dirty Dancer" (2011)

"More" is a song by American singer Usher, taken from the deluxe edition of his sixth studio album Raymond v. Raymond (2010). It was written by Charles Hinshaw, Usher, and RedOne, with the latter also producing the song.

The song was first released on March 16, 2010, through the US iTunes Store as the third promotional single in countdown to the album's release. Additionally it was featured as the iTunes-only bonus track on Raymond v. Raymond before later being included on the deluxe edition of the album, and his EP Versus. "More" was subsequently released as the album's fifth and final single. The single version was remixed by RedOne and Jimmy Joker, for a US release on November 22, 2010, and in the UK on December 13, 2010.

== Background and release ==
Along with several other tracks, "More" was leaked onto the internet in October 2009. The song was first released as a promotional single from Usher's sixth studio album, Raymond v. Raymond, through the United States on iTunes Store on March 16, 2010. In December 2009, the song was used to promote the Body By Milk Got Noise? program, where two all-teen film crews created two videos for the song. Fans were then given the chance to watch both videos and vote for their favourite. The song was later used to promote the 2010 NBA All-Star Game, with an exclusive music video Usher filmed with TNT. The video was run on 600 Regal Cinemas on January 29, 2010.

Following the album's release, "More" was included as an iTunes bonus track, later being added to the second disk of the deluxe edition of Raymond v. Raymond. On November 10, 2010, the official remix of the song leaked online, and was released as the fifth and final single from Raymond v. Raymond on November 22, 2010, in the US, under the title "More" (RedOne Jimmy Joker Remix). It was released in the United Kingdom on December 13, 2010, and in Germany on March 4, 2011.

== Chart performance ==
On the week ending April 13, 2010, "More" debuted at number seventy-six on the Billboard Hot 100; it stayed on the chart for one week. It re-entered the Hot 100 at number eighty-eight, and has since peaked at number fifteen. By March 20, 2011, "More" had sold over one million digital copies in the US. The song debuted on the UK Singles Chart at number eighty-nine, on the week ending May 8, 2010, and got knocked off the following week. Six months after its initial release it re-entered the chart at number ninety-five. It rose to number fifty-two the next week, and in its third week entered the Top 40 at number thirty-three. "More" topped the Canadian Hot 100 on the week ending January 27, 2011, selling 24,000 units. In Australia, "More" debuted at number twenty-three on the ARIA Singles Chart on the week dated January 24, 2011. It has since peaked at number seven.

== Music video and live performances ==
Usher performed the song before the tipping of the 2010 NBA All-Star Game in the Cowboys Stadium in Arlington, Texas, on February 14, 2010. A video of the Jimmy Joker Remix version of the song was released onto Usher's VEVO YouTube channel on March 4, 2011. The video was directed by Damien Wasylki and features clips of the OMG Tour during a concert in Paris's Palais omnisports de Paris-Bercy.

== Track listing ==
Digital download

1. "More" (RedOne Jimmy Joker Remix) – 3:40

Digital single

1. "More" (RedOne Jimmy Joker Remix) – 3:40
2. "More" (RedOne Jimmy Joker Extended Remix) – 5:12
3. "More" (RedOne Jimmy Joker Instrumental) – 3:39

CD single

1. "More" (RedOne Jimmy Joker Remix) – 3:39
2. "More" – 3:49

Digital remixes EP

1. "More" (RedOne Jimmy Joker Remix) – 3:40
2. "More" (Billionaire Remix) – 5:25
3. "More" (Gareth Wyn Remix) – 6:31
4. "More" (Olli Collins and Fred Portelli Remix) – 7:59

== Credits and personnel ==
- Songwriting – Bilal Hajji (remix-only), RedOne, Charles Hinshaw Jr., Usher Raymond
- Production – RedOne, Jimmy Joker (remix-only)
- Instruments and programming – RedOne, Jonny Severin (remix-only)
- Recording – RedOne
- Mixing – Robert Orton (album version), Trevor Muzzy (remix-only)

== Charts ==
=== Weekly charts ===
Weekly chart performance for "More"
Chart (2010–11)	Peak position
Australia (ARIA)	7
Austria (Ö3 Austria Top 40)	10
Belgium (Ultratop 50 Flanders)	7
Belgium (Ultratop 50 Wallonia)	6
Canada Hot 100 (Billboard)	1
Canada CHR/Top 40 (Billboard)	5
Czech Republic Airplay (ČNS IFPI)	28
Denmark (Tracklisten)	20
Finland (Suomen virallinen lista)	2
France (SNEP)	14
Germany (GfK)	7
German Airplay Chart	14
Hungary (Rádiós Top 40)	6
Ireland (IRMA)	25
Netherlands (Dutch Top 40)	4
Netherlands (Single Top 100)	8
New Zealand (Recorded Music NZ)	13
Norway (VG-lista)	9
Russia (Airplay)	141
Scottish Singles Sales (Official Charts)	32
Slovakia Airplay (ČNS IFPI)	17
Spain (Promusicae)	17
Sweden (Sverigetopplistan)	19
Switzerland (Schweizer Hitparade)	2
UK Singles (Official Charts)	23
UK Hip Hop/R&B (Official Charts)	7
US Billboard Hot 100	15
US Adult Pop Airplay (Billboard)	20
US Dance Club Songs (Billboard)	42
US Dance Airplay (Billboard)	1
US Pop Airplay (Billboard)	7
US Rhythmic Airplay (Billboard)	19

=== Year-end charts ===
2011 year-end chart performance for "More"
Chart (2011)	Position
Australia (ARIA)	57
Austria (IFPI)	73
Belgium (Ultratop Flanders)	41
Belgium (Ultratop Wallonia)	71
Canada (Canadian Hot 100)	23
Germany (Official German Charts)	38
Hungary (Rádiós Top 40)	18
Netherlands (Dutch Top 40)	23
Netherlands (Single Top 100)	46
Sweden (Sverigetopplistan)	79
Switzerland (Schweizer Hitparade)	29
UK Singles (Official Charts Company)	192
US Billboard Hot 100	61
US Dance/Mix Show Airplay (Billboard)	14
US Mainstream Top 40 (Billboard)	35

== Certifications ==
Certifications and sales for "More"
Region	Certification	Certified units/sales
Australia (ARIA)	3× Platinum	210,000^{‡}
Austria (IFPI Austria)	Gold	15,000^{*}
Belgium (BRMA)	Gold	15,000^{*}
Denmark (IFPI Danmark)	Gold	45,000^{‡}
Germany (BVMI)	Gold	150,000^{^}
New Zealand (RMNZ)	Gold	7,500^{*}
Sweden (GLF)	Gold	20,000^{‡}
Switzerland (IFPI Switzerland)	Platinum	30,000^{^}
United Kingdom (BPI)	Silver	200,000^{‡}
^{*} Sales figures based on certification alone.^{^} Shipments figures based on certification alone.^{‡} Sales+streaming figures based on certification alone.

== Release history ==
Release dates for "More"
Country	Date	Format (version)	Label
United States	March 16, 2010	Digital download (album version)	LaFace; Jive Records
United States	November 22, 2010	Digital download (single version)	LaFace; Jive Records
United Kingdom	December 13, 2010	Digital download (single version); (Club remixes EP)	RCA Records; Sony Music
Germany	March 4, 2011	CD single	Sony Music Entertainment
