= Lay You Down =

Single by Usher

from the EP Versus
- Released: September 28, 2010
- Recorded: 2010; Midnight Blue Studios (Miami, Florida); Circle House Studios (Miami, Florida)
- Genre: R&B
- Length: 4:03
- Label: LaFace; Jive
- Songwriters: Rico Love; Usher Raymond; Dwayne Nesmith
- Producers: Rico Love; Dwayne Nesmith

Usher singles chronology
"Hot Tottie" (2010)	"Lay You Down" (2010)	"More" (2010)

"Lay You Down" is a song by American R&B recording artist Usher. It was written by himself, Rico Love and Dwayne Nesmith, and produced by the latter two. It was released to urban radio on September 28, 2010, in the United States, as the third and final single from Usher's EP, Versus, which is an extension of his sixth studio album, Raymond v. Raymond. "Lay You Down" is an R&B song, that takes influence from pop musician Prince. The song entered the US Hot R&B/Hip-Hop Songs chart, and peaked at number fifty-six.

== Background and composition ==
"Lay You Down"
The chorus of the song, leading to the second verse. Usher described the song as a "classic R&B baby maker"; critics noted that it takes influence from pop musician Prince.

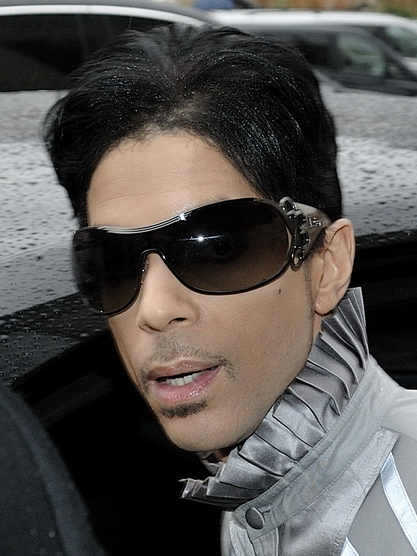
The song was noted to contain influence from pop musician Prince (pictured).

"Lay You Down" was written by Usher, Rico Love and Dwayne Nesmith, and produced by the latter two. Additional vocals were contributed by Love, and keyboard and programming was done by Nesmith. The song was recorded by Ian Cross at Midnight Blue Studios in Miami, Florida, and mixed by Rob Marks at Circle House Studios. "Lay You Down" is an R&B song with a length of four minutes and three seconds. In an interview with music video website Vevo, Usher explained that the song is a "classic R&B baby maker". Sara Anderson of AOL wrote that it opens "with improvisational, high-pitched 'ooohs' and base-driven synth beats." The song was released as the third and final single from Versus, an extended play released as an extension of his sixth studio album, Raymond v. Raymond (2010).

== Reception ==
Describing "Lay You Down" as one of the more sensual songs on Versus, Mark Nero of About.com wrote "the best of which might be the piano-laced 'Lay You Down,' on which Usher sings: 'This ain't bump 'n grind, I'll show you what love is if you let me lay you down.'" Sarah Rodman of The Boston Globe commended Usher's use of falsetto, whilst writing that the song "is an urgent boudoir jam that draws a neat line"– she also commented on how it takes inspiration from both Prince and Marvin Gaye. Los Angeles Times's Jeff Weiss also pointed out the influence from pop musician Prince, and how Usher is "unctuously cooing about wanting to be the: one who keeps your body warm." "Lay You Down" entered the R&B/Hip-Hop Songs chart on the week ending November 13, 2010, and peaked at number fifty-six, due to strong radio play.

== Credits and personnel ==
Recording locations

- Vocal recording – Midnight Blue Studios, Miami, FL.
- Mixing – Circle House Studios, Miami, FL.

Personnel

- Songwriting – Rico Love, Usher Raymond, Dwayne Nesmith
- Production – Rico Love, Dwayne Nesmith
- Vocal recording – Ian Cross
- Mixing – Rob Marks
- Additional vocals – Rico Love
- Keyboard and programming – Dwayne Nesmith

Credits adapted from the liner notes of Versus.

== Charts ==
Chart (2010)	Peak position
US Hot R&B/Hip-Hop Songs (Billboard)	56
