= Papers (song) =

Single by Usher

from the album Raymond v. Raymond
- A-side: "OMG"
- Released: October 16, 2009
- Recorded: 2009; Tree Sound Studios; Soapbox Studios (Atlanta, Georgia)
- Genre: R&B
- Length: 4:21
- Label: LaFace
- Songwriters: Usher Raymond; Sean Garrett; Xavier Dotson; Alonzo Mathis
- Producers: Sean Garrett; Zaytoven

Usher singles chronology
"Better on the Other Side" (2009)	"Papers" (2009)	"Spotlight" (2009)

"Papers" is a song by American singer Usher. The track was a buzz single for his sixth studio album Raymond v. Raymond. He and Alonzo "Gorilla Zoe" Mathis co-wrote the song with its producers Sean Garrett and Zaytoven. Although this was never identified as a track from the album, or as the lead single, it was released to U.S. urban and rhythmic radio stations on October 12, 2009, and subsequently available for digital download on October 16, 2009. The song peaked at number thirty-one on the Billboard Hot 100 and topped the Hot R&B/Hip-Hop Songs, giving Usher his tenth number one song on the chart.

== Background and composition ==
In June 2009, co-writer and producer of the song, Xavier "Zaytoven" Dotson revealed to MTV News that he worked with Usher on a song. Zaytoven divulged a few details, saying, "I can't wait for something like that to come out, so people can see I do more than just hip-hop. I can do R&B, pop, gospel ... whatever genre of music that's out. If you listen to [this new Usher song], you can't say, 'Zaytoven did that.'" According to Zaytoven in another interview with MTV News, the track was originally called "Filing Papers". Zaytoven said, "This is before there were any reports about Usher's marriage in the news. So I was thinking to myself, 'Is he trying to say something?' I don't know what Usher is going through, but Sean Garrett made a song about filling out papers, divorce papers. The beat, it's got a bounce to it. It's outta here." Sean Garrett later clarified, stating that the song was not necessarily called "Filing Papers", Garret commented,

"Let's say I wrote a record for Usher three or four months ago where I really didn't have any idea of what he was going through personally. I work really hard at creating records I feel that's gonna fit like a glove to an artist. Me and Usher have a close relationship; I tend to sort of assist certain artists in giving them a direction, where I think they need to go in their next move. I felt that was the direction we needed to go. I felt that was the question everyone wanted to know: Was [his relationship] good or was it bad? Was it right? Are you happy or you're not?"

Garrett continued to maintain that he had no idea of Usher's state of marriage during the time of the song's development, stating that the record could have meant anything, saying, "I'm a heavy believer in God. I'm a Pisces. My intuition is crazy. I think that's healthy in the process for me writing and producing for people. Maybe it was a sign of what my man was going through and he needed to get out. Maybe it was something she needed to hear as a wake-up call to her." In October 2009, the track was released as the album's buzz single, not intended to be the first release of Raymond v. Raymond, but to generate reception and feedback. In March 2010, Usher continued to support Garrett's original claims, stating the song was recorded before his marriage ended. Usher said in an interview for MTV News for promoting Raymond v. Raymond:

"I think people would have immediately alluded to the fact I was talking about my wife when I made that record — and now my ex-wife," he said. "When the song was recorded, I wasn't divorced. It was some reality in the contrast of trying to make it all work, having to balance a career and having a normal life. Coming in at 6 in the morning and arguing was a reality when you have those type of relationships. I felt that in a way, the story did touch on certain things at the time. I didn't know how realistic it would become. I didn't know I would become divorced. I did know it spoke on the contrast between trying to balance this world of being married and having this responsibility that's like a marriage at the same time. The song spoke to that place. Unfortunately, it did become a reality."

Garrett said the song appeals to everyone, saying "Whether you're a female in love, male in love, it's a real record. Your mama has to feel this record, your daddy has to feel this record, everybody has to feel this record. That's what good writers do." Of its appeal Garrett said that it would have the effect of "Yeah!", and called the song an "explosive record". Garrett went on to say, "I definitely feel it's what Usher's been wanting to say. But at the same time, it's what a lot of people wanted to say, they just didn't know what to say." Jayson Rodriguez of MTV News said that "Usher pulls back the curtain, revealing that a rumored rift between him and his mother was very real", and the song could be heard as a "postmortem" on his marriage, through the lines, "For you I gave my heart and turned my back against the world/ 'Cause you were my girl, girl, girl, I done damn near lost my mama, I done been through so much drama/ I done turned into the man I never thought I'd be/ I'm ready to sign them papers."

== Critical reception ==
Sarah MacRory of Billboard, compared the song to 2004's "Burn" and the latter's "layered harmonies, mellow production and lyrics of heartache". MacRory also said, "It's the first time in a while that the singer sounds energized, as he unleashes deeply personal lyrics about the real-life sacrifices he made for love." Jayson Rodriguez of MTV News predicted that if "Papers" were any indication of his upcoming album, then "Raymond vs. Raymond may break some sales records", as Confessions was the last time when "art was inspired by his life". Andy Kellman of AllMusic said that Usher "pours himself" into the "Papers" and that the song "bears the closest relation to the turbulence he experienced." Greg Kot of the Chicago Tribune said that "It's the kind of lacerating perspective that adulthood brings, but Usher’s too busy chasing his past to fully embrace it." Leah Greenblatt of Entertainment Weekly said that the song was the album's "last-straw slow jam" and the only song other than "Foolin' Around" that offers real revelation.

== Chart performance ==
On the week ending October 31, 2009 "Papers" debuted on the Billboard Hot 100 at ninety-two. In its second week, it moved sixty-one spots to thirty-one, where it peaked. The song spent a total of sixteen weeks on the chart. "Papers" also reached number one on the Billboard Hot R&B/Hip-Hop Songs becoming Usher's tenth number-one song on that chart.

== Track listing ==
- Digital download
1. "Papers" – 4:21

== Credits and personnel ==
Credits adapted from Raymond v. Raymond's liner notes.

- Songwriting – Usher Raymond, Sean Garrett, Zaytoven, Alonzo Mathis
- Production – Sean Garrett, Zaytoven
- Background vocals – Shelea Frazier, Romika Faniel, Tommy Parker, Solomon Dykes, Timothy Bloom
- Vocal production – Rico Love
- Recording – Miles Walker
- Vocal recording – Ian Cross, assisted by Blake Harden and Brandon Parks
- Mixing – Ian Cross and Matt Marrin, assisted by Alex Barajas

== Charts ==
=== Weekly charts ===
Weekly chart performance for "Papers"
Chart (2009–2010)	Peak position
US Billboard Hot 100	31
US Hot R&B/Hip-Hop Songs (Billboard)	1
US Rhythmic Airplay (Billboard)	21

=== Year-end charts ===
2009 year-end chart performance for "Papers"
Chart (2009)	Peak position
US Hot R&B/Hip-Hop Songs (Billboard)	89

2010 year-end chart performance for "Papers"
Chart (2010)	Peak position
US Adult R&B Songs (Billboard)	18
US Hot R&B/Hip-Hop Songs (Billboard)	36

== Certifications ==
Certifications and sales for "Papers"
Region	Certification	Certified units/sales
United States (RIAA)	Gold	500,000^{‡}
^{‡} Sales+streaming figures based on certification alone.

== Release history ==
Release history and formats for "Papers"
Region	Date	Format(s)
United States	October 8, 2009	Rhythmic and urban airplay
Australia	October 16, 2009	Digital download
Austria	October 16, 2009	Digital download
Belgium	October 16, 2009	Digital download
Canada	October 16, 2009	Digital download
Finland	October 16, 2009	Digital download
France	October 16, 2009	Digital download
Germany	October 16, 2009	Digital download
Ireland	October 16, 2009	Digital download
Italy	October 16, 2009	Digital download
Mexico	October 16, 2009	Digital download
Netherlands	October 16, 2009	Digital download
New Zealand	October 16, 2009	Digital download
Norway	October 16, 2009	Digital download
Portugal	October 16, 2009	Digital download
Spain	October 16, 2009	Digital download
Sweden	October 16, 2009	Digital download
United Kingdom	October 16, 2009	Digital download
United States	October 16, 2009	Digital download
Japan	December 16, 2009	Digital download

== See also ==
- List of R&B number-one singles of 2009 (U.S.)
