= Hot Tottie =

Single by Usher featuring Jay-Z

from the EP Versus
- Released: August 9, 2010
- Recorded: 2010
- Studio: No Excuses Studio (Santa Monica, California); Studio at the Palms (Paradise, Nevada)
- Genre: R&B; hip-hop
- Length: 4:59 (album version); 4:39 (radio edit)
- Label: LaFace; Jive
- Songwriters: Usher Raymond IV; Shawn Corey Carter; Ester Dean; Jamal Jones
- Producer: Polow da Don

Usher singles chronology
"DJ Got Us Fallin' in Love" (2010)	"Hot Tottie" (2010)	"Lay You Down" (2010)

Jay-Z singles chronology
"A Star Is Born" (2010)	"Hot Tottie" (2010)	"Monster" (2010)

"Hot Tottie" is a song by American singer Usher from his debut extended play (EP), Versus (2010), featuring guest vocals from American rapper Jay-Z and background vocals by American singer-songwriter Ester Dean. It was sent to rhythmic and urban airplay as the second single from the EP on August 9, 2010, by LaFace and Jive Records. It was written by Usher, Ester Dean, Jay-Z, and Polow da Don, with the latter producing it.

An R&B song with hip-hop tones, accompanied by strobing, electronic beats, "Hot Tottie" samples Big Tymers's "Big Ballin'" off their 1998 album, How You Luv That Vol. 2. It received mainly positive reviews from music critics and peaked at number twenty-one on the US Billboard Hot 100, and was a top ten hit on the US Hot R&B/Hip-Hop Songs chart. Usher performed the song on The Early Show and on his OMG Tour.

== Background and composition ==
"Hot Tottie"
A sample of "Hot Tottie", featuring vocals by Usher and Ester Dean, accompanied by a "strobing beat."

"Hot Tottie" was first leaked onto the internet during late July 2010 along with the track "DJ Got Us Fallin' in Love." It was originally reported to feature R&B singer Ciara. However, when the official mix of the song appeared online, Ester Dean, who sung vocals on the demo of the track, was singing the female vocal interludes. The song was released from Versus as the EP's urban single, whereas the latter track was released as the mainstream single. "Hot Tottie" is an R&B song that includes hip-hop, which is over "strobing, electronic beats" with Usher's vocals Auto-Tuned in parts. In an interview with MTV News at his World Leadership Awards in Atlanta, Usher called the song, which was already receiving rotation on radio due to a leak, "incredible," and confirmed that the song would be on his upcoming release of Versus. On August 31, 2010, a remix of the song, which features Lil' Kim, was released online. Usher performed the song on an untelevised portion of his appearance on The Early Show on September 3, 2010, and is performing it on his OMG Tour. The original version of "Hot Tottie" with Ciara was leaked on July 15, 2011, with Jay-Z's verse omitted.

== Reception ==
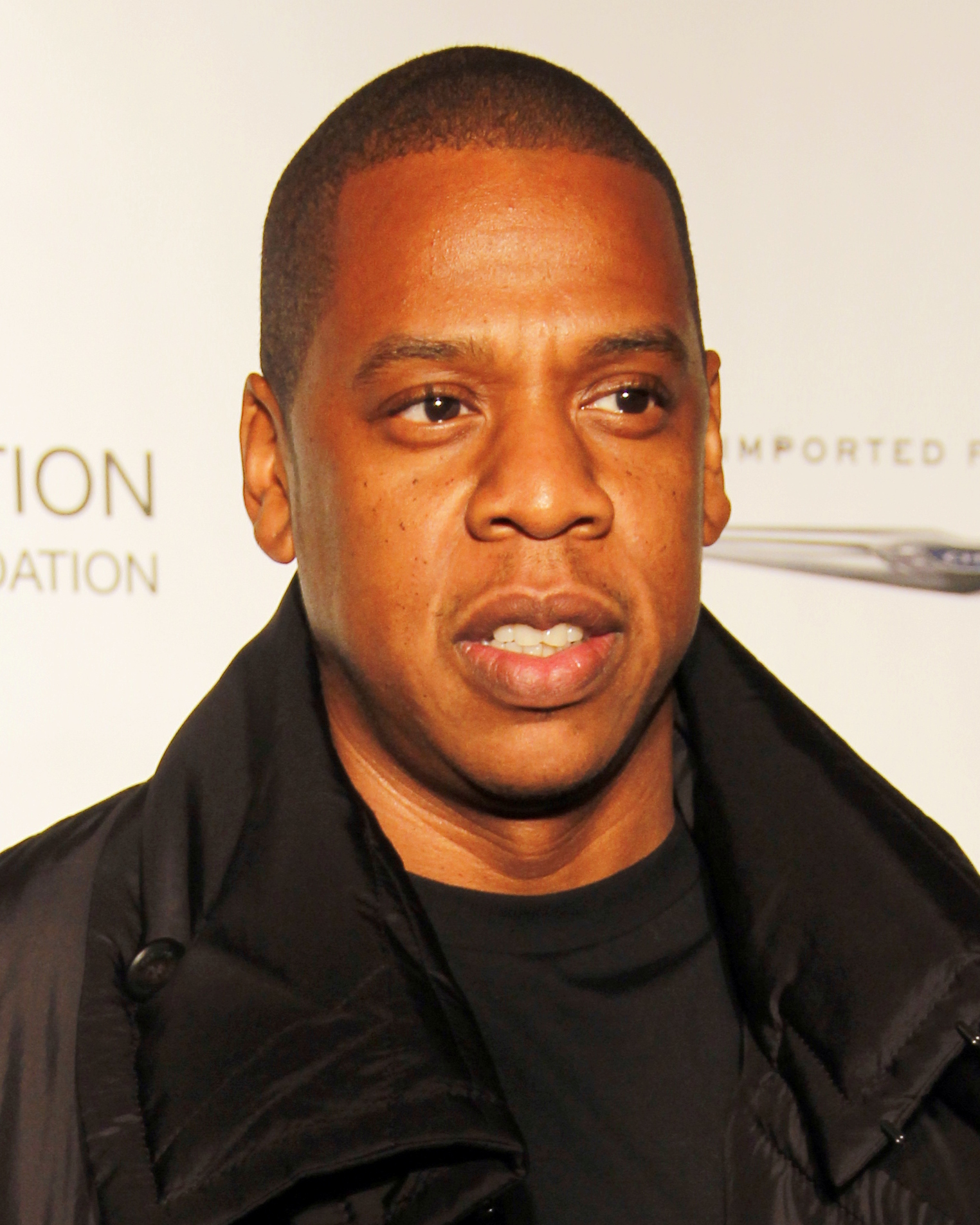
Jay-Z contributed vocals to the song.

Coining the track as "sleazed-up", Andy Kellman of AllMusic noted the track as a standout from Versus. Sarah Rodman of the Boston Globe called "Hot Tottie" the essential track on the EP, and said that Jay-Z "bumps up the fun factor" on the "burbling" track. Mark Edward Nero of About.com gave the song a positive review, saying that it was "a rock-solid tour de force featuring Usher vocalizing how smooth he is." Nero also commended Jay-Z's verse but said the only negative to the song was Ester Dean's vocals which were similar to those of Rihanna. Mikael Wood of Entertainment Weekly stated that the song is "nasty in all the right ways." Jeff Weiss of the Los Angeles Times says that Usher remains on the "R&B's A-list" with tracks like the song, calling it "as intoxicating as its namesake."

Based on airplay only, the song debuted on the Billboard Hot 100 at number 100. In its second week it rose to number eighty-eight. In its third week, due to the release of Versus, the song's sales elevated to number twenty-five after selling 52,000 digital downloads, and collected greatest gainer recognitions. It later peaked at number twenty-one on the chart, while reaching number seventeen on the Hot 100 Airplay and twenty-one on the Hot Digital Songs chart. The song reached number nine on the US R&B/Hip-Hop Songs chart, and number twenty-seven on the US Pop Songs chart. Internationally, "Hot Tottie" peaked at number sixty-two on the Canadian Hot 100. Although it was not officially released as a single in the UK, the song reached number 104 on the UK Singles Chart and number twenty-seven on the UK R&B Chart due to sales after the release of Versus only.

== Credits and personnel ==
Credits are adapted from the liner notes of Versus.

Locations

- Vocal recording – Studio at the Palms, Paradise, Nevada
- Mixing – No Excuses Studio, Santa Monica, California

Personnel

- Songwriting – Usher Raymond IV, Ester Dean, Shawn Corey Carter, Polow da Don
- Production – Polow da Don
- Recording – Jeremy "Jay" Stevenson
- Mixing – Jeremy "Jay" Stevenson

== Charts ==
=== Weekly charts ===
Chart (2010)	Peak position
Canada Hot 100 (Billboard)	62
UK Singles (The Official Charts Company)	104
UK Hip Hop/R&B (Official Charts)	27
US Billboard Hot 100	21
US Hot R&B/Hip-Hop Songs (Billboard)	9
US Pop Airplay (Billboard)	27
US Rhythmic Airplay (Billboard)	11

=== Year-end charts ===
Chart (2010)	Position
US Hot R&B/Hip-Hop Songs (Billboard)	58

== Certifications ==
Certifications and sales for "Hot Tottie"
Region	Certification	Certified units/sales
United States (RIAA)	Gold	500,000^{‡}
^{‡} Sales+streaming figures based on certification alone.

== Release history ==
Release dates
Country	Date	Format	Label	Ref.
United States	August 9, 2010	Rhythmic and Urban airplay	LaFace Records	
Australia	November 1, 2010	Contemporary hit radio	Jive Records	
