= There Goes My Baby (Usher song) =

Single by Usher

from the album Raymond v. Raymond and Versus
- Released: June 15, 2010
- Studio: Midnight Blue Studios (Miami, Florida)
- Genre: R&B
- Length: 4:41
- Label: LaFace
- Songwriters: Rico Love; James Scheffer; Frank Romano; Danny Morris
- Producers: Jim Jonsin; Rico Love

Usher singles chronology
"OMG" (2010)	"There Goes My Baby" (2010)	"Somebody to Love" (remix) (2010)

Music video
- "There Goes My Baby" on YouTube

"There Goes My Baby" is a song by American singer Usher. It was written by James Scheffer, Frank Romano, Danny Morris and Rico Love, with the latter producing the song with Jim Jonsin. The song was first released as the second promo single for his sixth studio album, Raymond v. Raymond (2010) on February 9, 2010, and later released to rhythmic and urban airplay as the album's fourth U.S. single from the album on June 15, 2010. It was later included the EP's follow-up set, Versus. "There Goes My Baby" is a down-tempo R&B piece, which makes use of Usher's falsetto range.

While reaching a peak of twenty-five on the Billboard Hot 100, it topped the Hot R&B/Hip-Hop Songs chart. The charting gave Usher his eleventh number-one on the chart, tying Ray Charles and R. Kelly for the fifth-most number-one's since the chart's inception. The song's accompanying music video features Usher pursuing his love interest in risque scenes. Usher performed the song a number of times, including at the 2010 BET Awards. The song earned Usher a Grammy Award for Best Male R&B Vocal Performance, at the 53rd Annual Grammy Awards on February 13, 2011.

== Composition and critical reception ==
"There Goes My Baby"
A sample of "There Goes My Baby", in which Usher makes heavy usage of his falsetto range.

"There Goes My Baby" is a, "slinky" down-tempo R&B ballad, with infused hints of neo soul. It is composed in a "moderate groove" of eighty beats per minute, and is set in common time. It is written the key of A major and Usher's vocals span from the low note of E_{3} to high note of C_{5}. It follows the chord progression A–F_{maj7}–G. The song makes use of Usher's falsetto range, which was warmly received by critics. Edna Gunderson of USA Today called Usher's falsetto "charming." Jaime Gill of Yahoo! Music UK said that the song was a delight and that its falsetto tenderness was absent in the rest of the work. Tyler Lewis of PopMatters said the song featured "nice falsetto work" from the singer, while Leah Greenblatt of Entertainment Weekly coined the song a "falsetto-laced plea."

Andy Kellman of AllMusic noted the track as a standout from Raymond v. Raymond. Greg Kot of the Chicago Tribune said that the sweetness of Usher's falsetto balanced out the album's "boilerplate swagger." Fraser McAlpine of BBC Music thought that the song recalled Usher's past slow jams, coining it, "a sumptuous deep-pile carpet of seductive song." Ashante Infantry of the Toronto Star said the song was one of the best on the album, and said that it was a "steamy slow jam." Calling the song "decent," James Reed of the Boston Globe thought the lyrical content was hollow. Calling it a low-point of the album, Matthew Cole of Slant Magazine said that the song was "sappy."

== Chart performance ==
As a promo single, the song debuted on the Billboard Hot 100 chart at number seventy-one solely from digital downloads. It fell off the next week, but upon its release as a single it re-entered at number 100, and eventually reached number twenty-five. It topped the US R&B/Hip-Hop chart for four consecutive weeks, giving Usher his eleventh number-one hit on that chart, and to date spent there the huge amount of 71 weeks. With eleven top singles on the chart, Usher tied with R. Kelly and Ray Charles on the Stevie Wonder-led list of most number ones since the inception of the chart. As the fourth single from Raymond v. Raymond, the single was also Usher's fourth consecutive top ten song on the R&B chart, a feat not matched by him since his Confessions era. "There Goes My Baby" was also Usher's fourth consecutive top forty song on the Hot 100, another feat not matched since Confessions.

== Music video ==
=== Background and synopsis ===
The accompanying music video for the song was filmed on June 16, 2010, in Malibu, California, and directed by Anthony Mandler. It took fifteen hours for the shoot. Preparing his physique for the filming, the singer told People, "At 31, when you take your shirt off, you must have it together!" A preview of the video was released on July 12, 2010, and the full video premiered on 106 & Park and Vevo on July 13, 2010.

Containing a vague plot, the opening scene of the clip features Usher donning a black tank top and dark jeans, while he stands in a field with the sun rising in the background. While performing tai chi-inspired dance moves, he begins to pursue his love interest, and appears shirtless in front of a black backdrop.

Usher and his love interest depicted in a risque scene in the video

Appearing alongside his interest in the backdrop scenes, Usher then sings propped on a concrete wall in a dark alley, while he and the woman tease each other, before moving outside on the balcony of a house on top of mountains. The singer performs acrobatic moves, including one in particular in which he does a pull-up onto the roof to kiss his partner. All previous scenes are intercut before culminating with Usher seducing his partner in bed, in racy moments with Usher in nothing but briefs as he pulls off her stockings. The final scene sees the singer driving off in a convertible.

=== Reception ===
Jayson Rodriguez of MTV News positively reviewed the clip, stating, "with a new video for his single "There Goes My Baby," the singer continues to push back at detractors who dare to suggest he's slipped." Megan Vick of Billboard said the clip was classic Usher, "from the stunning women to the architectural scenery and most importantly, the rippling abs." Lining up points on why the video should be watched, AOL Boombox said that the singer "sexes it up" in the video as he "proudly proclaims" the song's title. Brad Wete of Entertainment Weekly gave the video a mixed review, complimenting Usher's trademark sexual videos, but at the same time said it was not "new territory" for the singer, preferring he would take a video route as he did in 2008's "Trading Places."

The music video on YouTube has received over 84 million views as of Sept 2024.

== Live performances ==
While promoting Raymond v. Raymond, Usher performed the song along with others from the then-upcoming set on Good Morning America. In promotion of the single, he sang the song on Lopez Tonight on June 2, 2010, and on The View on June 9, 2010. Furthermore, Usher performed the song on the 2010 BET Awards in June 2010. In August 2010, he sang the song at his 2010 World Leadership Awards for his New Look Foundation, alongside other performers, friend Ciara and protege Justin Bieber. The same month, the singer later appeared on The Early Show as a part of their summer concert series. On September 17, 2010, he performed the song alongside "DJ Got Us Fallin' in Love" on Jimmy Kimmel Live!.

== Track listing ==
- Digital download
1. "There Goes My Baby" - 4:41

== Credits and personnel ==
Credits adapted from Raymond v. Raymond's liner notes.

- Songwriting – Rico Love, James Scheffer, Frank Romano, Danny Morris
- Production – Jim Jonsin, Rico Love
- Keyboards and programming – Jim Jonsin, Danny Morris
- Guitars – Frank Romano
- Additional vocals – Rico Love
- Recording – Ian Cross and assisted by Thomas McCrea and Jason Wilkie
- Mixing – Mark “Spike" Stent, assisted by Matty Green

== Charts ==
=== Weekly charts ===
Weekly chart performance for "There Goes My Baby"
Chart (2010)	Peak position
US Billboard Hot 100	25
US Hot R&B/Hip-Hop Songs (Billboard)	1
US Rhythmic Airplay (Billboard)	21

=== Year-end charts ===
2010 year-end chart performance for "There Goes My Baby"
Chart (2010)	Peak position
US Billboard Hot 100	83
US Hot R&B/Hip-Hop Songs (Billboard)	2
US Adult R&B Songs (Billboard)	1

2011 year-end chart performance for "There Goes My Baby"
Chart (2011)	Peak position
US Hot R&B/Hip-Hop Songs (Billboard)	68

=== Decade-end charts ===
Decade-end chart performance for "There Goes My Baby"
Chart (2010–2019)	Position
US Hot R&B/Hip-Hop Songs (Billboard)	17

== Certifications ==
Certifications and sales for "There Goes My Baby"
Region	Certification	Certified units/sales
United States (RIAA)	2× Platinum	2,000,000^{‡}
^{‡} Sales+streaming figures based on certification alone.

== Release history ==
Release history and formats for "There Goes My Baby"
Region	Date	Format(s)	Ref.
United States	June 15, 2010	Rhythmic and urban airplay	

== See also ==
- List of R&B number-one singles of 2010 (U.S.)
