= OMG (Usher song) =

2010 single by Usher

Single by Usher featuring will.i.am

from the album Raymond v. Raymond
- B-side: "Papers"
- Released: March 22, 2010
- Recorded: 2009
- Studio: Chung King (New York City)
- Genre: Dance-pop; electropop; R&B
- Length: 4:45 (album version w/o will.i.am); 4:28 (radio edit)
- Label: LaFace
- Songwriter: William Adams
- Producer: will.i.am

Usher singles chronology
"Lil Freak" (2010)	"OMG" (2010)	"There Goes My Baby" (2010)

will.i.am singles chronology
"3 Words" (2009)	"OMG" (2010)	"Wavin' Flag" (Celebration Mix) (2010)

Music video
- "OMG" on YouTube

"OMG" is a song by American singer Usher featuring American rapper will.i.am, who also wrote and produced the song. It uses the auto-tune effect in several lines, as well as Jock Jams-esque sports arena chanting. It was released as the fourth single off Usher's sixth studio album, Raymond v. Raymond on March 22, 2010, four days before the album was released. The song was met with a mixed reception from music critics, who criticized the use of Auto-Tune, as well as will.i.am's production and appearance, but commended the song's dance and club vibe. The song marks the second time that Usher has collaborated with will.i.am, following the single "What's Your Name" from Usher's previous album, Here I Stand (2008).

"OMG" peaked at the top of the Billboard Hot 100, becoming Usher's ninth number-one hit on the chart, making him the first 2010s artist to collect number-one singles in three consecutive decades. He became only the fourth artist of all-time to achieve that feat. Usher also became the third artist to have at least one number-one song from five consecutive studio albums. Outside of the United States, "OMG" topped the charts in Australia, Ireland, New Zealand, and the United Kingdom, and peaked within the top ten of the charts in Belgium (Flanders) and Canada. The song's choreography and dance-heavy accompanying music video has been compared by critics to that of "Yeah!". Usher performed the song live several times including on the ninth season of American Idol with will.i.am. He also performed the song as a part of a medley during his critically acclaimed performance at the 2010 MTV Video Music Awards. "OMG", was named the fifth best selling song of 2010 in the US, selling 3.8 million units. The song sold 7 million copies worldwide during that year.

== Production and composition ==
"OMG"
A 28-second sample of "OMG", featuring the chorus by Usher, supported by the "oh-oh, oh-oh" hook.

"OMG" was written and produced by The Black Eyed Peas frontman, will.i.am. The tune was recorded at Chung King Studios, New York City. Dylan "3-D" Dresdow mixed the record at Paper V.U. Studios, North Hollywood. The vocal sample of a crowd shouting "oh oh" was taken from a crowd hype chant that will.i.am first noticed from the audience during a Black Eyed Peas' concert in France. The song was recorded by will.i.am while performing with The Black Eyed Peas on the French TV show Taratata.

"OMG" is a midtempo pop song, drawing from the subgenres of dance-pop and synthpop, and is also influenced by R&B. The song also infuses hints of Eurodance. Several lines feature the Auto-Tune vocal effect, and makes use of "hypnotic" hand claps, and Jock Jams-esque arena chanting. The song is set in common time, and has a tempo of 130 beats per minute. It is written in the key of E minor, and Usher's vocals span from the low note of G_{3} to high note of E_{5}. It follows the chord progression Em–D–Bm_{7}–C_{6}. According to James Reed of The Boston Globe, Usher is featured in a staccato delivery over the song's minimalist dance beat." will.i.am begins the song with the line, "Oh my gosh" then Usher starts singing the chorus. He performs his verse and the second chorus, before will.i.am gives his verse. "OMG" concludes with an extended final chorus. Mikael Wood of The Los Angeles Times said that the lyrics of the song detail Usher's encounter with a woman in a club.

== Reception ==
=== Critical ===
The song has garnered a mixed reception, with most critics disapproving of the auto-tuned vocals, and the production and appearance by will.i.am, but commended the song's dance and club vibe. Edna Gundersen of USA Today said that Usher seemed "disengaged" on the song, and allowed will.i.am. to "bludgeon" the song with auto-tune. Greg Kot of the Chicago Tribune said the song was one of the tracks where production fell short on Raymond v. Raymond, calling the song another auto-tuned "formulaic chant" by will.i.am. The New York Daily News said that the song is "as annoying as the tech-speak it mimics." Andrew Winistorfer of Prefix Magazine preferred "Lil Freak" to be the album's big single, stating that the song "doesn't come close to matching the filthy heights of "Little Freak," [sic] but the sports arena chanting thing hasn't been done this well since the '90s when Jock Jams were enormous." Winistorfer also said that Usher brought back his "bad taste" in collaborators since Lil Jon on "Yeah!", saying that having the latter on this song would be an improvement.

James Reed of the Boston Globe said that Usher "fares better" on the collaboration. Mikael Wood of The Los Angeles Times commended the song's "thumping" groove. Gail Mitchell of Billboard said that Usher "pumps up the beat on the infectious club anthem." Caroline Sullivan of The Guardian, called the track "irresistible". Monica Herrera of Billboard magazine said the song, like "Yeah!", appealed to a broader audience and attuned to clubs. Herrera also said that "the lyrics are hypnotic hand claps and soccer-game chants that fade in and out to keep the party going".

=== Controversy ===
In 2010, WYOY disc jockeys compared part of Usher's verse to a song sung by Homer Simpson in "Dude, Where's My Ranch?", a 2003 episode of television comedy The Simpsons. The cadences of the line, "Honey got a booty like pow, pow, pow. Honey got some boobies like wow, oh wow" were compared to those of Homer's tune, "Christmas in December, wow wow wow. Give me tons of presents, now now now." Simon Vozick-Levinson of Entertainment Weekly disagreed, calling the likenesses "a random coincidence".

=== Accolades ===
Publication	Accolade	Rank
MTV	Top 25 Songs of 2010	1
BET Awards	Top 25 Songs of 2010	2
Rolling Stone	20 Biggest Songs of the Summer: The 2010s	8
Time	Top 10 Songs of Summer 2010	1
New York Post	The top 210 Songs of 2010	100

== Chart performance ==
The song debuted at number 14 on the Billboard Hot 100 selling 130,000 units in its first week. The song became the third-highest debut on the Billboard Hot 100 of Usher's career, behind 1997's "Nice & Slow" at number nine, and 1998's "My Way" at thirteen. For the week ending May 15, 2010, the song lifted to number one on the chart, becoming Usher's ninth number-one single and Will.i.am's first number one single as a solo artist (or without his group, The Black Eyed Peas). The song collected airplay and digital gainer honors, moving from 14 to seven on the Hot 100 Airplay chart, and two to one on the Hot Digital Songs chart. The song later topped both charts. By March 2011, the song has reached 4 million in sales, and as of May 2013, the song has sold 4,719,000 copies.

With the song, Usher tied with the Bee Gees, Elton John, and Paul McCartney for ninth among artists all time with the most Hot 100 hits. Usher also became the third male solo artist, behind McCartney and Michael Jackson to collect at least one number-one single from five consecutive albums. The song made Usher the first artist in the 2010s to have a number-one single in three consecutive decades, Usher's being the 1990s, 2000s and 2010s. He became only the fifth artist of all time to accomplish this, the others being Stevie Wonder in the 1960s, 1970s and 1980s; Michael Jackson in the 1970s, 1980s, and 1990s; and Madonna and Janet Jackson in the 1980s, 1990s and 2000s. "OMG" was the second shortest title to lead the chart, tying Jackson's "Ben", "Bad", and "ABC" with the Jackson 5, with Britney Spears' "3" being the chart-topper with the shortest title.

The song charted at number three on the R&B/Hip-Hop Songs chart, two on the Pop Songs chart, and three on the Hot Dance Club Play chart. It also topped the Rhythmic Top 40, making Usher the first artist to collect 10 number ones on the chart, above 50 Cent, Beyoncé, Nelly, T-Pain, and Mariah Carey, each of which with seven. Usher led first on the chart with "You Make Me Wanna" for thirteen weeks from 1997 to 1998 and "Love in This Club" featuring Young Jeezy in 2008.

"OMG" reached number two in Canada, and was certified Platinum by the Canadian Recording Industry Association. It was later upgraded to 2× Platinum for shipments over 160,000 copies. It sold 223,000 copies during 2010 in Canada. Internationally, "OMG" charted across Europe, peaking at the top of the charts in Ireland and the United Kingdom. In the latter country, "OMG" became Britain's fourth biggest-selling song of 2010. It also charted moderately in other countries, allowing it to reach a peak of six on the European Hot 100. Besides this, the song reached the top ten in Slovakia and Belgium (Flanders), top twenty in Belgium (Wallonia), Japan, Czech Republic, Netherlands, Brazil and France, top thirty in Germany, Denmark and Sweden and top forty in Hungary, Mexico, Brazil (Airplay) and Switzerland. In Australia and New Zealand the song placed at the top of the charts. It was certified 2× Platinum by the Australian Recording Industry Association, and Platinum in New Zealand by the Recording Industry Association of New Zealand for shipments of 15,000 units. It was later upgraded to 6× Platinum in Australia for shipments over 420,000 copies.

== Music video ==
=== Background ===
Usher and will.i.am shot the video the weekend of March 6, 2010. The video was directed by Anthony Mandler. In an interview with Rap-Up, Mandler said about the concept of the video: "...The video is a spectacle. It really emphasizes what we love about Usher and the character and the icon that he is, and most importantly, it's really a video that showcases his superstardom". The video was released on March 30, 2010, on VEVO and AMTV. According to Mandler, the original idea for the video was citing Max Headroom, a fictional artificial intelligence character from 1980s British television and film. The reference is made when Usher is seen on a flickering television at the beginning of the video. Mandler specified, commenting, "Max Headroom was always in his room," he continued, "this unidentifiable room, '80s shapes. I used that for inspiration." Usher stated that he wanted to do something theatrical and fun, and that while will.i.am. brought the international sound, he wanted to bring the producer into his world, "working off of each other and playing off of each other as artists, but the cinematography would be artistic and incredible." Mandler described the visuals in the clip as "Hitchcock-ian", as well as simply capturing Usher in his element, as he said he wanted the R&B singer's talent to take over. He further explained, stating,

"The concept was to create a world where we put Usher in a space where he does what I think he does better than anyone else in the world, which is perform at a level and magnitude of a superstar and take us, the viewer, whether audible or visually, on a journey, not a ride. And, in that, I wanted to create an unpredictability, so one set leads to another and another, and you never know what's gonna happen. Along the way, Usher becomes our guide. We're so focused on him, we don't notice the change. The thing is unfolding little by little, and you can't quite see far enough ahead to know what's gonna come next."

=== Synopsis and reception ===
A still from the video, showing the first scene with Usher on a flickering television, paying homage to Max Headroom

The video begins with Usher flickering on a television in a room, before we see him in a scene dancing with blue flashing lights, and will.i.am. is shown in a similar room with red flashing lights. Usher is then shown with female background dancers in a white room. In the scene he dons a pair of glasses which show the dancers performing through the lens. Usher then dances outside in front of a concrete wall, with male background dancers appearing as shadows. As will.i.am. performs his verse, he and Usher are seen in their corresponding rooms with flashing lights. After this, Usher puffs a cigar and dances with male background dancers in an arena-like area, whilst he is also joined by female dancers with flashing lights on the floor, with the video ending with Usher shown on the flashing television.

In a review of the video, Brad Wete of Entertainment Weekly said, "For a song with such a title, it sure does take a minute for its video to build up to wow-worthy moments. After some clean dance sequences, the magic begins. Usher grooves with shadows, puffs out O's with cigar smoke, and then links back up with his ladies on a primary colored dance floor to show off his steps." Chris Ryan of MTV News compared the video's flashing lights to the music video for "Yeah!", and called the song an answer track to Trey Songz's "LOL". At the 2010 MTV Video Music Awards, the clip was nominated for Best Dance Video, Best Choreography, and Best Male Video.

The music video on YouTube has received over 215 million views as of March 2024.

== Live performances ==
Usher performed the song with will.i.am. on the ninth season of American Idol, appearing in a black bowler and matching black suit with silver lapels, accompanied by flames and other pyrotechnics. They then performed the song together on The Oprah Winfrey Show on May 10, 2010. The song has also been performed live in Australia on Hey Hey it's Saturday on May 19, 2010, as well as on Sunrise on May 21, 2010. Usher later performed the song on The Ellen DeGeneres Show, So You Think You Can Dance, Good Morning America and live in the United Kingdom on Britain's Got Talent and at Capital FM's Summertime Ball concert at Wembley Stadium. On August 6, 2010, he performed the song alongside other hits at his New Look Foundation's inaugural World Leadership Awards in Atlanta, where his protege Justin Bieber and R&B singer Ciara also performed. Another event the song was performed at was the Activision E3 Event.

The song was performed alongside "DJ Got Us Fallin' in Love" during the 2010 MTV Video Music Awards. VMA executive producer Dave Sirulnick told MTV News, "We said to him, 'We want to do the best televised dance routine that you've done in years. Let's show why you're the king.'" MTV Buzzworthy writer, Tamar Antai was present at the rehearsal for the show, and commented that the VMA crew was about to "pull off visual feats not just previously unseen and unparalleled at the VMAs, but unseen and unparalleled on TV." The performance was received with critical acclaim. On Usher specifically Antai said the performance was like "liquid magic", saying, "He took it to the level that comes after the next level. The penthouse level." He was aided by about a dozen background dancers, the males in skeleton-like costumes, and the females donning a one-piece, gloves and boots. The "OMG" performance was accompanied by red laser lights, making an illusion as if the stage disappeared. The lights spelled out "O.M.G" as well as "Usher", as dancers lowered from the ceiling. Jayson Rodriguez of MTV News commented, "The singer moved and grooved, proving that he's the R&B star that everyone pays attention to for the big moments." Rochell D. Thomas, also of the site said "Call it what you will: talent, swag, skills...When he steps on the dance floor, some mysterious thing comes out of him and puts the G in groove." Thomas went on to say that Usher's dance moves would make "the late great Michael Jackson jealous" in the stage production "that included more special-effects bells and whistles than a summer blockbuster." Chris Ryan of MTV Buzzworthy also compared the performance to Jackson, calling it overall, "One part "Tron," one part laser show, one part Michael Jackson choreo tribute, and all spectacle." Usher appeared with The Black Eyed Peas to perform the song during the Super Bowl XLV halftime show. Usher also performed the song at the Super Bowl LVIII halftime show alongside will.i.am.

== Track listing ==
- Germany CD Single
1. "OMG" (featuring will.i.am) – 4:28
2. "Papers" – 4:20
- OMG – The Remixes
1. "OMG" (Almighty Mix) – 6:35
2. "OMG" (Riva Starr Remix) – 6:49
3. "OMG" (Ripper Dirty Club Mix) – 7:48
4. "OMG" (Ripper Commercial Mix) – 4:25
5. "OMG" (Gucci Mane Remix) – 4:18
- OMG – The Remix EP
1. "OMG" (Cory Enemy Club Mix) – 5:51
2. "OMG" (Cory Enemy Dub Mix) – 5:51
3. "OMG" (Kovas Ghetto Beat Mix) – 5:34
4. "OMG" (Don Vito 2 The Left Mix) – 4:11
5. "OMG" (Disco Fries Extended Mix) – 6:38
6. "OMG" (Instrumental Version) – 4:29

== Personnel ==
- Vocals – Usher
- Lyrics, music, production, instruments, recording, engineering, vocals – will.i.am
- Mixing – Dylan "3-D" Dresdow

== Charts ==
=== Weekly charts ===
Chart (2010–2011)	Peak position
Australia (ARIA)	1
Austria (Ö3 Austria Top 40)	41
Belgium (Ultratop 50 Flanders)	10
Belgium (Ultratop 50 Wallonia)	16
Brazil (Billboard) Hot 100 Airplay	37
Brazil (Billboard) Hot Pop Songs	14
Canada Hot 100 (Billboard)	2
Czech Republic Airplay (ČNS IFPI)	17
Denmark (Tracklisten)	21
Europe (European Hot 100 Singles)	6
France (SNEP)	16
Germany (GfK)	27
Hungary (Rádiós Top 40)	40
Ireland (IRMA)	1
Japan Hot 100 (Billboard)	11
Mexico Airplay (Billboard)	36
Netherlands (Dutch Top 40 Tipparade)	12
Netherlands (Single Top 100)	39
New Zealand (Recorded Music NZ)	1
Scottish Singles Sales (Official Charts)	2
Sweden (Sverigetopplistan)	28
Slovakia Airplay (ČNS IFPI)	9
Switzerland (Schweizer Hitparade)	38
UK Singles (Official Charts)	1
UK Hip Hop/R&B (Official Charts)	1
US Billboard Hot 100	1
US Dance Club Songs (Billboard)	3
US Dance Singles Sales (Billboard)	1
US Hot Latin Songs (Billboard)	21
US Hot R&B/Hip-Hop Songs (Billboard)	3
US Pop Airplay (Billboard)	2
US Rhythmic Airplay (Billboard)	1

=== Year-end charts ===
Chart (2010)	Position
Australia (ARIA)	2
Australia Urban (ARIA)	2
Belgium (Ultratop 50 Flanders)	54
Belgium (Ultratop 50 Wallonia)	75
Brazil (Crowley)	87
Canada (Canadian Hot 100)	13
Europe (European Hot 100)	49
Ireland (IRMA)	14
Japan Adult Contemporary (Billboard)	40
New Zealand (Recorded Music NZ)	7
Sweden (Sverigetopplistan)	88
Taiwan (Hito Radio)	41
UK Singles (OCC)	4
US Billboard Hot 100	5
US Hot Dance Club Songs (Billboard)	11
US Hot R&B/Hip-Hop Songs (Billboard)	29
US Hot Latin Songs (Billboard)	55
US Pop Songs (Billboard)	14
US Rhythmic (Billboard)	3

=== Decade-end charts ===
Chart (2010–2019)	Position
US Billboard Hot 100	60

== Certifications ==
Region	Certification	Certified units/sales
Australia (ARIA)	6× Platinum	420,000^{‡}
Canada (Music Canada)	2× Platinum	223,000
Germany (BVMI)	Gold	150,000^{‡}
Mexico (AMPROFON)	Gold	30,000^{*}
New Zealand (RMNZ)	3× Platinum	90,000^{‡}
Sweden (GLF)	Gold	20,000^{‡}
United Kingdom (BPI)	2× Platinum	1,200,000^{‡}
United States (RIAA)	8× Platinum	8,000,000^{‡}
^{*} Sales figures based on certification alone.^{‡} Sales+streaming figures based on certification alone.

== Release history ==
Region	Date	Format
Germany	March 12, 2010	CD single; digital download
United States	March 22, 2010	Digital download
Australia	April 16, 2010	CD single; digital download

== See also ==
- List of number-one singles in Australia in 2010
- List of best-selling singles in Australia
- List of number-one singles of 2010 (Ireland)
- List of number-one singles in 2010 (New Zealand)
- List of number-one singles from the 2010s (UK)
- List of number-one R&B hits of 2010 (UK)
- List of Billboard Hot 100 number-one singles of 2010
