= Away from Home Tour =

2010 concert tour by Drake

- Debut tour by Drake
- Location: North America
- Associated album: So Far Gone; Thank Me Later
- Start date: April 5, 2010
- End date: November 6, 2010
- Legs: 4
- No. of shows: 79
- Box office: $8 million ($11.81 million in 2025 dollars)

Drake concert chronology
- Away from Home Tour (2010); Club Paradise Tour (2012)

The Away from Home Tour, also marketed as the Light Dreams and Nightmares Tour, was the first headlining concert tour by Canadian recording artist, Drake.

The tour began on April 5, 2010 in Slippery Rock, Pennsylvania and continued until November 6, 2010 with its final show scheduled in Las Vegas. Scheduled for 78 performances across the United States and Canada, the tour was also utilized as a part of an environmentally friendly campaign alongside non-profit organization Reverb.

The tour marks Drake's first concert tour after signing with Young Money Entertainment, as well as his first tour where he serves as the headline act. The concert tour, which featured k-os and Francis & The Lights as initial opening acts, is in support of Drake's debut studio album and extended play, Thank Me Later and So Far Gone, respectively. Most of the track-list from these projects were performed, such as singles "Best I Ever Had", "I'm Goin' In", "Successful" and concert closer "Over". Additional singles where Drake acts as a featured artist were also performed, including "I Invented Sex", "BedRock", and "Forever". Despite bookings for a European leg of the tour, it was ultimately scrapped in favor of domestic support of the projects.

The tour had a total gross of over $8 million off of 78 shows, making it one of the highest-grossing hip-hop tours of 2010.

== Background ==
Drake and Reverb would announce that the Away from Home Tour would be expanded to various colleges throughout the United States.

Dubbed the "Campus Consciousness" leg of the tour, the organization would work with Drake in order to minimize the output of fossil fuels during the tour. By incorporating the use of biodiesel as well as introducing biodegradable and recyclable products throughout the tour, tents that featured green technology sought to teach students about carbon emissions and promote eco-consumer sampling.

== Musical additions ==
=== Opening acts ===
- k-os (United States — Leg 1)
- Francis & The Lights (United States — Leg 1)
- P. Reign (Canada)
- Clipse (United States — Leg 4)
- Tyga (Bloomington)

=== Setlist ===
1. "Forever"
2. "Unstoppable"
3. "Uptown"
4. "Lust for Life"
5. "Houstatlantavegas"
6. "November 18th"
7. "Fireworks"
8. "Killers"
9. "Money to Blow" / "Big Tymers" / "I'm Still Fly"
10. "I'm Goin' In"
11. "Every Girl / "Bedrock" / "Throw It In the Bag"
12. "Un-Thinkable (I'm Ready)"
13. "A Night Off"
14. "Successful"
15. "Fear"
16. "Say Something"
17. "I Invented Sex"
18. "Best I Ever Had"
19. "Over"

== Tour dates ==
Date	City	Country	Venue
North America
April 5, 2010	Slippery Rock	United States	Aebersold Student Recreation Center
April 6, 2010	Charleston	United States	Lantz Arena
April 7, 2010	Columbus	United States	Value City Arena
April 9, 2010^{[A]}	University Park	United States	Bryce Jordan Center
April 10, 2010^{[A]}	Boston	United States	Matthews Arena
April 11, 2010^{[A]}	Lock Haven	United States	Thomas Fieldhouse
April 14, 2010^{[A]}	East Lansing	United States	MSU Auditorium
April 15, 2010^{[A]}	Rochester Hills	United States	Meadow Brook Music Festival
April 16, 2010^{[A]}	Morgantown	United States	WVU Coliseum
April 21, 2010^{[A]}	Orlando	United States	UCF Arena
April 22, 2010^{[A]}	Greenville	United States	Timmons Arena
April 24, 2010^{[A]}	New Orleans	United States	Fair Grounds Race Course
April 26, 2010^{[A]}	Kansas City	United States	Swinney Recreation Center
April 27, 2010^{[A]}	Lexington	United States	Memorial Coliseum
April 30, 2010^{[A]}	Syracuse	United States	Syracuse University
May 1, 2010^{[C]}^{[D]}	East Rutherford	United States	New Meadowlands Stadium Grounds
May 1, 2010^{[C]}^{[D]}	Medford	United States	President's Lawn
May 4, 2010^{[A]}	Worcester	United States	Hart Center
May 5, 2010^{[A]}	Baltimore	United States	Pier Six Concert Pavilion
May 6, 2010^{[A]}	Thornbury Township	United States	Cheyney University of Pennsylvania
May 7, 2010^{[A]}	Ithaca	United States	Ho Plaza
May 8, 2010^{[A]}	Plymouth	United States	PSU Campus Grounds
May 12, 2010	San Francisco	United States	Warfield Theatre
May 13, 2010	Los Angeles	United States	Nokia Theatre L.A. Live
May 14, 2010	San Diego	United States	North Campus Recreation Area
May 15, 2010	Santa Barbara	United States	Harder Stadium
May 17, 2010	Denver	United States	Ogden Theatre
May 19, 2010	Dallas	United States	Palladium Ballroom
May 20, 2010	Grand Prairie	United States	Verizon Theatre at Grand Prairie
May 21, 2010	Austin	United States	Waller Creek Amphitheatre
May 23, 2010	Memphis	United States	Cannon Center for the Performing Arts
May 25, 2010	Charlotte	United States	The Fillmore Charlotte
May 27, 2010	Cleveland	United States	House of Blues
May 28, 2010	Cincinnati	United States	Bogart's
June 3, 2010^{[E]}	Providence	United States	Dunkin' Donuts Center
June 4, 2010^{[F]}	Hartford	United States	XL Center
June 5, 2010^{[G]}	Mansfield	United States	Comcast Center
June 6, 2010^{[H]}	East Rutherford	United States	New Meadowlands Stadium
June 12, 2010^{[I]}	Maryland Heights	United States	Verizon Wireless Amphitheater
June 13, 2010	Washington, D.C.	United States	9:30 Club
June 15, 2010^{[J]}	New York City	United States	South Street Seaport
June 16, 2010	Philadelphia	United States	Theater of the Living Arts
June 19, 2010^{[K]}	Auburn	United States	White River Amphitheatre
July 16, 2010^{[L]}	Ottawa	Canada	Claridge Homes Stage
July 17, 2010	Saint John	Canada	Harbour Station
July 18, 2010	Montreal	Canada	Métropolis
July 21, 2010	Winnipeg	Canada	Centennial Concert Hall
July 23, 2010	Saskatoon	Canada	Credit Union Centre
July 24, 2010	Edmonton	Canada	Edmonton Events Centre
July 25, 2010	Calgary	Canada	Big Four Building
July 27, 2010	Vancouver	Canada	Chan Centre for the Performing Arts
August 13, 2010^{[M]}	Indianapolis	United States	Hoosier Lottery Grandstand
September 6, 2010^{[N]}	Seattle	United States	Seattle Center
September 20, 2010	Miami	United States	James L. Knight Center
September 21, 2010	Miami	United States	James L. Knight Center
September 23, 2010	Jacksonville, Florida	United States	Jacksonville Center For The Performing Arts
September 24, 2010	Tampa	United States	USF Sun Dome
September 28, 2010	New York City	United States	Radio City Music Hall
September 29, 2010	New York City	United States	Radio City Music Hall
October 1, 2010	Vestal	United States	Binghamton University Events Center
October 2, 2010	Washington, D.C.	United States	DAR Constitution Hall
October 3, 2010	Washington, D.C.	United States	DAR Constitution Hall
October 6, 2010	Atlanta	United States	Fox Theatre
October 9, 2010^{[O]}	Greensboro	United States	Greensboro Coliseum
October 12, 2010	St. Louis	United States	Fox Theatre
October 13, 2010	Chicago	United States	Chicago Theatre
October 14, 2010	Chicago	United States	Chicago Theatre
October 16, 2010	Bloomington	United States	U.S. Cellular Coliseum
October 17, 2010	DeKalb	United States	Convocation Center
October 19, 2010	Detroit	United States	Fox Theatre
October 21, 2010	Wallingford	United States	Oakdale Theatre
October 22, 2010^{[P]}	Philadelphia	United States	Wells Fargo Center
October 25, 2010^{[Q]}	Boston	United States	TD Garden
October 26, 2010	Lowell	United States	Tsongas Center
October 29, 2010	Houston	United States	Reliant Arena
October 30, 2010^{[R]}	New Orleans	United States	City Park
October 31, 2010	Grand Prairie	United States	Verizon Theatre at Grand Prairie
November 2, 2010	Denver	United States	Wells Fargo Theatre
November 4, 2010	Los Angeles	United States	Gibson Amphitheatre
November 6, 2010	Las Vegas	The Joint	

Festivals and other miscellaneous performances

^{A} Campus Consciousness Tour
^{B} New Orleans Jazz & Heritage Festival
^{C} Bamboozle Festival
^{D} Spring Fling
^{E} WWKX Hot Night
^{F} Hot Jam 9
^{G} JAM'N 94.5 Summer Jam
^{H} Summer Jam
^{I} Super Jam 3
^{J} Sounds like Paper
^{K} KUBE 93 Summer Jam
^{L} Ottawa Bluesfest
^{M} Indiana State Fair
^{N} Bumbershoot
^{O} Aggie Homecoming Concert
^{P} Powerhouse 2010
^{Q} Monster Jam
^{R} Voodoo Music + Arts Experience

Cancellations and rescheduled shows

April 29, 2010	Lowell, Massachusetts	Tsongas Center	Cancelled.
July 2, 2010	Arendal, Norway	Tromøy	Cancelled. Appearance a part of Hove Festival.
July 3, 2010	Roskilde, Denmark	Roskilde Festivalpladsen	Cancelled. Appearance a part of Roskilde Festival.
July 4, 2010	London, England	Hyde Park	Cancelled. Appearance a part of Wireless Festival.
July 5, 2010	Paris, France	La Cigale	Cancelled.
July 7, 2010	Amsterdam, Netherlands	Paradiso	Cancelled.
July 8, 2010	Liège, Belgium	Parc Reine Astrid	Cancelled. Appearance a part of Les Ardentes.
July 9, 2010	County Kildare, Ireland	Punchestown Racecourse	Cancelled. Appearance a part of Oxegen.
July 10, 2010	Perth and Kinross, Scotland	Balado	Cancelled. Appearance a part of T in the Park.
July 12, 2010	London, England	O_{2} Shepherd's Bush Empire	Cancelled.
July 13, 2010	London, England	O_{2} Shepherd's Bush Empire	Cancelled.
July 14, 2010	Manchester, England	Manchester Academy	Cancelled.
