= Say Aah =

2010 single by Trey Songz featuring Fabolous

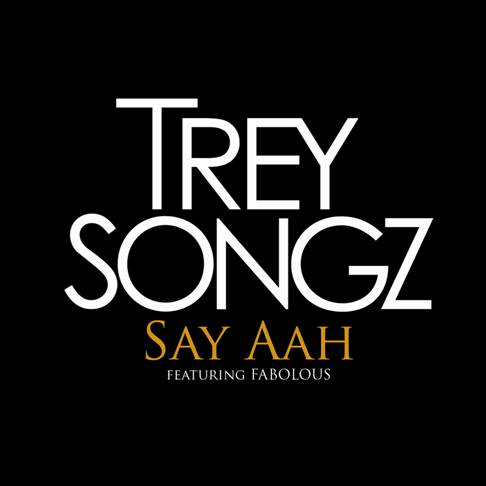

Single by Trey Songz featuring Fabolous

from the album Ready
- Released: January 12, 2010; (see radio adds)
- Recorded: 2009
- Studio: D2 Music Studios, (Atlanta, Georgia)
- Genre: Hip hop; R&B; crunk&B
- Length: 3:27
- Label: Atlantic; Songbook
- Songwriters: Tremaine Neverson; John Jackson; Nathan Walker; Ronald Ferebee; Don Corell; Tony "Chef Tone" Scales
- Producers: Young Yonny; Troy Taylor

Trey Songz singles chronology
"I Invented Sex" (2009)	"Say Aah" (2010)	"Neighbors Know My Name" (2010)

Fabolous singles chronology
"Everything, Everyday, Everywhere" (2009)	"Say Aah" (2009)	"Money Goes, Honey Stay (When the Money Goes Remix)" (2009)

"Say Aah" is a song by American singer Trey Songz featuring American rapper Fabolous. The track was written by the two along with Nate Walka, Ronald M. Ferebee Jr., Tony Scales, and Don Correll, with the latter producing it with Troy Taylor and Young Yonny. It was released on January 12, 2010, as the fourth single from Songz's third studio effort, Ready (2009). The song has lyrical content referring to a night of drinking during a birthday celebration, with the title referencing the eponymous phrase said by doctors or dentists to denote a patient's oral treatment.

The song received mostly positive reviews, and it became Songz's biggest hit at the time, reaching number nine on the US Billboard Hot 100, his first top ten hit. Additionally, it reached number three on the Hot R&B/Hip-Hop Songs chart and peaked at sixteen on the Pop Songs chart. The song was later certified Double Platinum in the United States by the RIAA. "Say Aah" became Songz's first song to chart internationally, reaching number forty-three in Canada. The music video features Songz and Fabolous at a club, and it serves as a predecessor to the video for "I Invented Sex", also by Songz. The song was nominated for "Viewers' Choice" and "Best Collaboration" at the 2010 BET Awards.

== Background ==
Recorded at Atlanta's D2 Music Studios in 2009, "Say Aah" was written by Trey Songz, Fabolous, Nate Walka, Ronald M. Ferebee Jr., and Tony "Chef Tone" Scales. Produced by Young Yonny and Troy Taylor. Taylor himself recorded the song while Jean Marie Horvat mixed the track. According to Songz in an interview with GoWhereHipHop, Fabolous decided to record a verse for track the day Ready was set to be mastered, which was during the week of the release of his fifth studio album Loso's Way. In an August 2009 interview, when asked about Fabolous's appearance on the track Songz insinuated that "Say Aah" would be released as one of the last singles from Ready, calling it "one of the hottest club records to be out next year." The first remix of the song to be released also features American rapper Young Jeezy, while another features fellow American rappers Juelz Santana and Ace Hood. Female rappers Shonie, Trina and Brianna released a "Ladies Remix" to the song in December 2009. R&B singer Teairra Mari released her remix of the song in January 2010.

The title refers to the imperative phrase Say Aah, often said by medical doctors when they want to inspect the mouth cavity of a patient.

== Composition and critical reception ==
"Say Aah"
A sample of "Say Aah", featuring the line "we don't buy no drinks at the bar" one of many hooks in the song.

The song has been referred to as an "indecent behavior anthem" due to its lyrical content. Ken Capobianco of the Boston Globe said that "Say Aah" was one of the "popping tracks" which parent album Ready was built around. Commenting on the song's lyrics, Chris Ryan of MTV Buzzworthy stated that, "Its over-abundance of hooks ('we don't buyyyy no drinks at the bar' being a personal favorite) makes it pretty hard to dislike. And the verse from Brooklyn's Fabolous will bring in even the most hardened of fun-haters." Vibe called the song "the official birthday song of the year", claiming that it was better than Jeremih's "Birthday Sex". The song was nominated for "Viewers' Choice" and "Best Collaboration" at the 2010 BET Awards.

== Chart performance ==
On the week ending November 28, 2009, the song entered the Billboard Hot 100 at sixty-eight. Its position on the charts fluctuated for several weeks before it peaked at number nine on the week of March 13, 2010, the highest chart placing Songz had achieved in his career. The song track spent a total of twenty-three weeks on the chart. Additionally the song peaked at three on the Hot R&B/Hip-Hop Songs chart, Songz's third top ten R&B single from Ready. As Songz's first song to impact pop radio, it reached sixteen on the Pop Songs chart. On February 22, 2010, the single became Songz's first song to be recognized by the Recording Industry Association of America, with certified sales of 500,000 units. The song has gone on to reach Double Platinum status in 2015. The track became Songz's first international chart hit, appearing at number forty-three on the Canadian Hot 100.

== Music video ==
The music video was directed by Yolande Geralds, who also directed the clip for Songz's previous single. "I Invented Sex." The video was filmed on October 7, 2009. Wynter Gordon, DJ Clue as well as Jessica White performing the owner of the Party make appearances in the video. Stills from the clip were released on the following day, October 8, 2009. A combination video was released for the dual clips of "Say Aah" and "I Invented Sex" and the videos were also released separately. Songz confirmed to MTV News in November 2009 that the latter would be a continuation of the previous. On the video, Songz said that he wanted the video to be "sexy" and "adult" in which everyone had fun. He further explained,

"The song speaks on more so a club atmosphere, but the video is more lofty — sexy women all over the place, adults having fun. This one lady in particular, she's representing the independent women without taking it over the top. She's got her own. She takes me back to her crib — so we invent sex together."

In a review of the video, calling the song itself "ballerific", Chris Ryan of MTV Buzzworthy said, "the video keeps it pretty grown in sexy", commenting the choice of button down shirts as attire and commending Fabolous's part, which he said, "has a very plain-spoken feel to it, and because his blue-framed shades are matching his shirt.".

The video starts with Trey arriving at the club he gets out of the car and walks towards the guard, telling him "Aye, when I give you these keys homeboy, don't move my car man, I ride in the front ya dig, Don't move my shit man..." before he walks toward a girl who is alongside her boyfriend and tells her (ho baby, what's your name) and then he gets into the club and then the song starts.

== Live performances ==
Songz performed the song on 106 & Park's New Year's Eve celebration on December 31, 2009. The song was then performed again with "I Invented Sex" on It's On with Alexa Chung. On January 15, 2010, he performed the song on The Wendy Williams Show. He also performed the song on Lopez Tonight as well as The Blueprint 3 Tour, and performed it with Fabolous at West Hollywood's House of Blues. He performed the song once again on 106 & Park on February 11, 2010, for "Love Week" as a medley with "Neighbors Know My Name" and "I Invented Sex". "Say Aah" was performed by Songz at MTV's Spring Break 2010 in Acapulco, Mexico.

== Credits and personnel ==
- Songwriting – Trey Songz, Fabolous, Nate Walka, Ronald M. Ferebee Jr., Tony "Chef Tone" Scales
- Production – Troy Taylor, Young Yonny
- Recording – Troy Taylor
- Mixing – Jean Marie Horvat

== Charts ==
=== Weekly charts ===
Chart (2010)	Peak position
Belgium (Ultratip Bubbling Under Flanders)	25
Canada Hot 100 (Billboard)	43
US Billboard Hot 100	9
US Dance Airplay (Billboard)	24
US Hot R&B/Hip-Hop Songs (Billboard)	3
US Pop Airplay (Billboard)	16

=== Year-end charts ===
Chart (2010)	Position
US Billboard Hot 100	31
US Hot R&B/Hip-Hop Songs (Billboard)	5
US Rhythmic (Billboard)	2

== Certifications ==
Region	Certification	Certified units/sales
Canada (Music Canada)	Gold	40,000^{‡}
New Zealand (RMNZ)	Gold	15,000^{‡}
United States (RIAA)	2× Platinum	2,000,000^{‡}
^{‡} Sales+streaming figures based on certification alone.

== Radio adds ==
Region	Date	Format
United States	January 12, 2010	Rhythmic and urban airplay
