= So Far Gone (mixtape) =

Mixtape by Drake
- Released: February 13, 2009
- Recorded: 2008
- Genres: Hip hop; pop rap; alternative R&B; downtempo
- Length: 70:35
- Label: OVO
- Producers: Noah "40" Shebib (also exec.): Oliver El-Khatib (exec.); Björn Yttling; Boi-1da; D10; DJ Screw; Diplo; J. Hill; Just Blaze; Kanye West; Megaman; Northen Profit; Peter Bjorn & John

Drake chronology
Comeback Season (2007)	So Far Gone (2009)	So Far Gone (2009)

Singles from So Far Gone
- 1. "Best I Ever Had" Released: February 13, 2009; 2. "Successful" Released: February 13, 2009

So Far Gone is the third mixtape by Canadian rapper Drake. It was released on February 13, 2009 self-released under his October's Very Own label. The mixtape was met with critical and commercial success, serving as a catalyst for Drake's career as a mainstream musical artist. So Far Gone peaked at number seven on the Canadian Albums Chart and number five on the Billboard 200. It remains Drake's final independent project.

Its lead singles, "Best I Ever Had" and "Successful" reached numbers two and 17 respectively on the US Billboard Hot 100. The mixtape was promoted with a release party in Toronto with Drake and LeBron James. Guest appearances include Omarion, Lloyd, Lykke Li, Lil Wayne and Bun B, while production was handled by 40 and Boi-1da—whose contributions to the musical direction of the mixtape were particularly praised.

On February 15, 2019, the mixtape was released on commercial streaming services for the first time, commemorating its tenth anniversary. The commercial release contains a bonus track, "Congratulations", which also appears on the physical release of the album.

== Background ==
In an interview with Complex, Drake explains: "The whole tape extends from one of my closest friends Oliver. One night we were having a discussion about women and the way we were talking about them, it was so brazen and so disrespectful. He texted me right after we got off the phone and he was like, 'Are we becoming the men that our mothers divorced?' That's really where the cover comes from, too. It's just this kid in pursuit of love and money. We're good guys, I'm friends with some real good people and for him to even text me after we got off the phone it just showed we have a conscience. But sometimes you just get so far gone, you get wrapped up in this shit. The title has a lot of meanings—as the way we carry ourselves, the way we dress, the way people view us, not to sound cocky, it's just that feeling that we're just distanced in a good way. You're just elevating past the bullshit and past all the shit that you used to be a part of and you're not that proud of, you're just so far gone."

== Composition ==
=== Music ===
"Let's Call It Off"
"Let's Call It Off" is an ethereal breakup song that contains samples taken from Swedish indie-rock band Peter Bjorn and John. Drake reflects on the unraveling of an intimate relationship with melancholic Auto-Tune singing.

"Say What's Real"
An atmospheric track that balances witty levity with traditional braggadocios rapping. Drake recites brazen lyrics that primarily engage in self-promotion over minimalist beats, heavy organ sustain and electronic bleeps sampled from the opening track of 808s & Heartbreak.

"Little Bit"
"Little Bit" is an adolescent love song built on crooning and a Lykke Li sample. The track is arranged to act as a duet, with Drake and Lykke Li's meek voices slowly encircling one anothers and confessing their romantic feelings atop spare heartbeat drum and percussion.

The mixtape's music was characterized by atmospheric keyboards, minor keys, snare drum, synth lead, smooth piano, live instruments, down tempo and mid tempo tracks, sparse and minimalist beats, and atmospheric chords. In a Complex interview, Drake's primary producer, Noah "40" Shebib, said that 808s & Heartbreak was an influence on the mixtape's atmospheric sounds.

=== Lyrics ===
Typically, lyrics in So Far Gone address his relationships with women, gaining fame, past struggles, and creates metaphors for the struggles of others ("Houstatlantavegas", a stripper, "November 18th", the city of Houston etc.) Many of the more upbeat songs also include themes of braggadociosness, ego, wealth, the music industry, confidence around women and sexual experiences.

== Singles and promotion ==
"Best I Ever Had" was released as the first single on the 13th of February, 2009, 7 months prior to the release of the EP as a digital download from the So Far Gone mixtape. The song was eventually released as an official single on June 16, 2009. The single charted for 24 weeks while eventually peaking at number 2 on the US Billboard Hot 100. The single also managed to peak at number one on both the Billboard R&B/Hip-Hop Songs Chart and the Billboard Rap Songs Chart, thus becoming Drake's first number one hit on both of these charts. The song was certified 2× platinum by the Recording Industry Association of America (RIAA) indicating sales of over 2,000,000 copies in the United States. The song would later be released in the United Kingdom on the 29th of November, 2010, and the track would also appear as a bonus track on the Japanese edition of Drake's debut studio album, Thank Me Later.

"Successful" was released as the second single from So Far Gone. The single managed to peak at number 17 on the US Billboard Hot 100 and spent a total of 18 weeks on the chart. The song also reached the Top 5 on both the R&B/Hip-Hop and Rap charts peaking at number 3 and number 2 respectively. It was certified gold by the Recording Industry Association of America (RIAA) indicating sales of over 500,000 copies in the United States. The song would also appear as a bonus track on the Japanese edition of Thank Me Later, alongside appearing on Trey Songz' third studio album, Ready, released on the 31st of August.

On the 15th of September, the So Far Gone EP was released. This EP features five songs from the mixtape ("Houstatlantavegas", "Successful", "Best I Ever Had", "Uptown", and "The Calm"), alongside two EP-exclusive tracks, "I'm Goin' In" and "Fear". "I'm Goin In" was released as a single on the 27th of October. Later, "Best I Ever Had", "Successful", and "Uptown" would be included as the bonus tracks on the Japanese edition of Drake's studio album debut, Thank Me Later.

== Critical reception ==
Professional ratings
Aggregate scores
Source	Rating
Metacritic	81/100
Review scores
Source	Rating
The Boston Globe	4/5 stars
Exclaim!	4/5 stars
Pitchfork	7.4/10
Slant Magazine	3/5
Sputnikmusic	4/5 stars

The mixtape was well received. It currently holds a score of 81 out of 100 on Metacritic, indicating "universal acclaim". RapReviews.com gave a positive review of the mixtape and commented on it by saying "So Far Gone is unquestionably one of the most cohesive, atmospheric hip hop records in recent memory--which is almost the antithesis of what one expects from a mixtape." The Boston Globe gave the mixtape a positive score and commented by saying "His materialism threads throughout So Far Gone (champagne flutes, girls, BlackBerrys, more girls), but he chases that with soft touches of humor and honesty." Pitchfork reviewed the mixtape positively and said "So Far Gone still scans as one of the most compulsively listenable mixtapes of a great year for mixtapes." Slant Magazine gave the mixtape a mixed review, but commended Drake's effort, "For a beginner, even one whose big-time endorsements seem to have cemented a promising start, So Far Gone is a pretty brave effort, and Drake's ability to juggle standard bling-and-bluster narratives with intelligent narratives bodes well for his future".

=== Accolades ===
- MTV's Hottest Mixtape of The Year
- Complex's No. 3 Best Albums of 2009
- Complex's No. 5 Best Mixtape Album of The Decade

== Commercial performance ==
So Far Gone debuted at number five on the Billboard 200, with 45,000 equivalent album units earned in the week ending February 21, 2019, ten years after its release.

== Track listing ==
Standard edition
No.	Title	Writer(s)	Length
1.	"Lust for Life"	Aubrey Graham; Noah Shebib; Roland Orzabal	2:56
2.	"Houstatlantavegas"	Graham; Shebib	4:51
3.	"Successful" (featuring Trey Songz and Lil Wayne)	Graham; Shebib; Tremaine Neverson; Dwayne Carter	6:14
4.	"Let's Call It Off" (featuring Peter Bjorn and John)	Björn Yttling; Peter Morén; John Eriksson	3:54
5.	"November 18th"	Graham; Christopher Wallace; Osten Harvey; Burt Bacharach; Hal David; Robert Davis; Jermaine Dupri^{[a]}; Marcus Edwards^{[a]}; George Canler^{[a]}; Wally Palamarchuk^{[a]}; Mike Skill^{[a]}; Jimmy Marinos^{[a]}; Peter Solley^{[a]}; Bernard Freeman^{[a]}; Chad Butler^{[a]}; Donald Hepburn^{[a]}; Bruce Smith^{[a]}	3:07
6.	"Ignant Shit" (featuring Lil Wayne)	Graham; D. Carter; Justin Smith; Shawn Carter; Dwight Grant; Ernie Isley; Marvin Isley; O'Kelly Isley; Ronald Isley; Rudolph Isley; Chris Jasper	5:04
7.	"A Night Off" (featuring Lloyd)	Graham; Lloyd Polite; Shebib; S. Carter; Grant; Isley; Isley; Isley; Isley; Isley; Jasper	3:14
8.	"Say What's Real"	Graham; Kanye West; Jeff Bhasker; Dexter Mills^{[a]}; Jay Jenkins^{[a]}; Malik Jones^{[a]}; Benjamin McIldowie^{[a]}	3:51
9.	"Little Bit" (featuring Lykke Li)	Lykke Zachrisson; Yttling	3:50
10.	"Best I Ever Had"	Graham; Matthew Samuels; D. Carter^{[a]}; Nakia Coleman^{[a]}; Dan Hamilton^{[a]}; Ann Hamilton^{[a]}	4:18
11.	"Unstoppable" (featuring Santigold and Lil Wayne)	Santi White; John Hill; Thomas Pentz	3:30
12.	"Uptown" (featuring Bun B and Lil Wayne)	Graham; Freeman; D. Carter; Samuels; Jeremy McArthur; William Joel	6:22
13.	"Sooner Than Later"	Graham; Shebib; Dalton Tennant	4:22
14.	"Bria's Interlude" (featuring Omarion)	Graham; Shebib; Omari Grandberry; Melissa Elliott; Timothy Mosley; Maurice White; Verdine White	2:19
15.	"The Calm"	Graham; Shebib	4:04
16.	"Outro" (performed by Chilly Gonzales)	Jason Beck	2:55
17.	"Brand New"	Graham; Shebib; Tennant	3:37
Total length:			68:17

Physical and 2019 digital version bonus track
No.	Title	Writer(s)	Length
18.	"Congratulations"	Graham; Shebib; Orville McWhinney; Chris Martin; Guy Berryman; Jonny Buckland; Will Champion	5:33
Total length:			73:49

=== Notes ===
- ^{^[a]} signifies a songwriter that is not listed on music streaming services.

Sample credits

- "Lust for Life" contains a sample of "Ideas as Opiates", written by Roland Orzabal, as performed by Tears for Fears.
- "Let's Call It Off" contains a sample of "Let's Call It Off", written by Peter Morén, Björn Yttling and John Eriksson, as performed by Peter Bjorn and John.
- "November 18th" contains a sample of a chopped-and-screwed version of "Da Streets Ain't Right", written by Jermaine Dupri, as performed by Kris Kross, and remixed by Robert Davis; and "Pimp tha Pen", written by Marcus Edwards, as performed by Lil' Keke.
  - "Pimp tha Pen" contains a sample of "Pocket Full of Stones", written by Bernard Freeman and Chad Butler, as performed by UGK.
  - "Da Streets Ain't Right" contains a portion of "Warning", written by Christopher Wallace and Osten Harvey, as performed by the Notorious B.I.G.; and embodies a portion of "Talking in Your Sleep", written by George Canler, Wally Palamarchuk, Mike Skill, Jimmy Marinos and Peter Solley, as performed by the Romantics.
    - "Warning" contains a sample from "Walk On By", written by Burt Bacharach and Hal David, as performed by Isaac Hayes.
- "Ignant Shit" and "A Night Off" contain samples of "Ignorant Shit", written by Shawn Carter, Justin Smith and Dwight Grant, as performed by Jay-Z and Beanie Sigel.
- "Say What's Real" contains a sample of "Say You Will", written by Kanye West, Jeff Bhasker, Dexter Mills, Jay Jenkins, Malik Jones and Benjamin McIldowie, as performed by Kanye West.
- "Little Bit" contains a sample of "Little Bit", written by Lykke Zachrisson and Björn Yttling, as performed by Lykke Li.
- "Best I Ever Had" contains a sample from "Fallin' in Love (again)", written by Dan Hamilton, as performed by Hamilton, Joe Frank & Reynolds; and portions of "Do It for the Boy", written in part by Nakia Coleman.
- "Unstoppable" contains a sample of "Unstoppable", written by John Hill, Thomas Pentz and Santi White, as performed by Santigold.
- "Uptown" contains elements and excerpts of "Uptown Girl", written by Billy Joel.
- "Bria's Interlude" contains a sample of "Friendly Skies", written by Missy Elliott and Timothy Mosley, as performed by Missy Elliott.
  - "Friendly Skies" contains a sample of "New World Symphony" written by Maurice White and Verdine White, as performed by Earth, Wind & Fire.
- "Outro" contains a sample of "The Tourist", written by Jason Beck, and performed by Chilly Gonzales.
- "Congratulations" contains a sample of "Viva la Vida", written by Chris Martin, Guy Berryman, Jonny Buckland and Will Champion, as performed by Coldplay.

== Personnel ==
Credits adapted from Tidal.

- 40 – mixing, recording engineering (1–15, 17); production (1–3, 7, 14, 15), remixing (4, 9, 11), vocal engineering (13, 17); additional production (18)
- Boi-1da – production (10, 12)
- D10 – production (13, 17)
- Björn Yttling – production (4)
- DJ Screw – production (5)
- Just Blaze – production (6)
- Kanye West – production (8)
- Björn Yttling – production (9)
- Diplo – production (11)
- John Hill – production (11)
- Arthur McArthur – production (12)
- Sebastian Nadal – production (16)
- Megaman – production (18)
- The Peresian Gangster – remixing (11)
- Finis "KY" White – additional vocal engineering (3, 6, 12)
- Cory Mo – additional vocal engineering (12)

== Charts ==
Weekly chart performance for "So Far Gone"
Chart (2019)	Peak position
Australian Albums (ARIA)	34
Belgian Albums (Ultratop Flanders)	37
Canadian Albums (Billboard)	7
Dutch Albums (Album Top 100)	21
Irish Albums (IRMA)	57
Swiss Albums (Schweizer Hitparade)	61
UK Albums (Official Charts)	21
US Billboard 200	5
US Top R&B/Hip-Hop Albums (Billboard)	1

== Certifications ==
Certifications for So Far Gone
Region	Certification	Certified units/sales
New Zealand (RMNZ)	Platinum	15,000^{‡}
United Kingdom (BPI)	Silver	60,000^{‡}
^{‡} Sales+streaming figures based on certification alone.

== Release history ==
Region	Date	Format(s)	Label	Ref.
Various	February 13, 2009	Digital download	October's Very Own	
Various	February 15, 2019	Streaming	Young Money; Cash Money	
