= I Need a Girl (Trey Songz song) =

Single by Trey Songz

from the album Ready
- B-side: "Brand New"
- Released: April 14, 2009
- Recorded: Roc the Mic Studios (New York City, New York); D2 Music Studios (Atlanta, Georgia)
- Genre: R&B
- Length: 3:37
- Label: Atlantic; Songbook
- Songwriters: Johntá Austin; Joshua J. Jackson; Tor Erik Hermansen, Mikkel Eriksen; Espen Lind; Amund Bjorklund
- Producer: Stargate

Trey Songz singles chronology
"Missin' You" (2007)	"I Need a Girl" (2009)	"Successful" (2009)

"I Need a Girl" is a song by American recording artist Trey Songz. The track was written by Johntá Austin and Joshua J. Jackson, along with the song's production team, Stargate, who also produced his breakthrough hit, "Can't Help But Wait." The song served as the lead single for Songz's third studio album Ready. "I Need a Girl" received positive to mixed reviews from critics, some of which noted it as generic, and other naming it as a top track from the album. It reached fifty-nine on the Billboard Hot 100 and six on the Hot R&B/Hip-Hop Songs chart. The accompanying music video shot in Malibu features Songz and love interests on the beach, as they turn out to be mirages.

== Background ==
In an interview with New York's Power 105.1, he said that the death of Michael Jackson inspired his latest comeback, stating, "Mike passed away and it just lit the fire in me—it made me go in the studio and do something. I’m excited."

"I Need A Girl" was also featured in a 2009 episode of Lincoln Heights in which Trey Songz appears as a guest star.

== Composition ==
"I Need a Girl"
A sample of "I Need a Girl," a mid-tempo R&B piece.

"I Need A Girl" is a mid-tempo R&B ballad, featuring guitar riffs. According to Mark Edward Nero of About.com, the song contains familiar qualities of Songz's breakout hit "Can't Help But Wait", also produced by Stargate. The song is lyrically about finding and pleasing the right woman, through lines such as, "I don't even know your name, but I know that I'm your man and you are my girl, if I ever meet you I'm gonna give you the world, Baby please believe me when I tell you that I need a girl." The song has been described to be a mix of Usher and Justin Timberlake, and has been compared to Chris Brown's "With You."

== Critical reception ==
Mark Edward Nero of About.com said that the song was "sappy" and "cliche", trying to replicate the success of "Can't Help But Wait", but "doesn't come close". Nero also commented that the song sounded insincere compared with the rawly sexual songs on the album. Ajitpaul Mangat of Tiny Mix Tapes noted the song as some of the album's generic work, stating, "with its run-of-the-mill lyrics about longing hearts, it sounds like the work of any middling R&B singer." Tyler Lewis of PopMatters said "I Need A Girl" was among the album's best songs, that it and "Neighbors Know My Name", "thump as they should." David Jeffries of Allmusic noted the song as a standout track from Ready. Glenn Gamboa of Newsday said that on the track, Songz "displays a more flexible delivery than usual." DJBooth said, "Traditional R&B depends on three things: vocals, writing, and production. In a nutshell, I Need A Girl has the whole trifecta, and should be just what Trey needs to get Ready a solid release date."

== Chart performance ==
On the week labeled May 30, 2009, "I Need a Girl" debuted at 100 on the Billboard Hot 100. Several weeks later on the week of September 19, 2009, it peaked at fifty-nine on the chart, where it stayed for one week, spending a total of sixteen weeks on the chart. After a total of eight weeks on the Hot R&B/Hip-Hop Songs chart, on the week labeled July 4, 2009, "I Need A Girl" peaked at six on it.

== Remix ==
The official remix features rapper Fabolous and R&B singer Teyana Taylor, and was released by Songz via Twitter during his "Music Monday" series preceding the album. A second remix features Mase who jumped on dual remixes for the song and Drake's "Best I Ever Had." Reviewing the remix of the song featuring Fabolous and Teyana Taylor, DJBooth said, "Expect the combo of Taylor’s cooed vocals and Trey and Loso’s time-tested musical chemistry to leave listeners more amped than ever before for the release of Songz’ [sic] latest LP—after waiting this long, I think it’s safe to say they’re more than Ready."

== Music video ==
The music video was directed by Benny Boom, and filmed in Malibu, California during the weekend of April 4, 2009. Stills from the video shoot were released on April 8, 2009. The music video was released on May 1, 2009. In the video, Songz sees several women along the beach, and plays volleyball with them, walks along the coastline, relaxes on a parked motorcycle, and other things, however in each instance they disappear and turn out to be illusions. In a review AOL Boombox recommended the video as one to watch, commenting, "The crooner admits that it gets 'lonely in this business,' which is why he needs a companion aka a 'homey' and he won't rest 'til he finds the one for him."

== Live performances ==
Songz performed the song on September 2, 2009 and on 106 & Park as a part of a medley with "Successful" and "LOL Smiley Face", and on September 9, 2009 on The Wendy Williams Show.

== Credits and personnel ==
- Songwriting - Johntá Austin, Tor Erik Hermansen, Mikkel Eriksen, Espen Lind, Amund Bjorklund
- Production - Tor Erik Hermansen, Mikkel Eriksen, Espen Lind, Amund Bjorklund
- Recording - Mikkel Eriksen
- Vocal recording - Troy Taylor
- Guitar - Espen Lind
- All other instruments - Tor Erik Hermansen, Mikkel Eriksen
- Mixing - Phil Tan, assisted by Josh Houghkirk

== Charts ==
=== Weekly charts ===
Chart (2009)	Peak position
US Billboard Hot 100	59
US Hot R&B/Hip-Hop Songs (Billboard)	6
US Rhythmic Airplay (Billboard)	22

=== Year-end charts ===
Chart (2009)	Position
US Hot R&B/Hip-Hop Songs (Billboard)	27

== Certifications ==
Region	Certification	Certified units/sales
United States (RIAA)	Gold	500,000^{‡}
^{‡} Sales+streaming figures based on certification alone.

== Release history ==
Country	Date	Format
United States	April 14, 2009	Digital download
United States	April 14, 2009	Rhythmic and urban airplay
