= Jessica White =

American actress and model (born 1984)

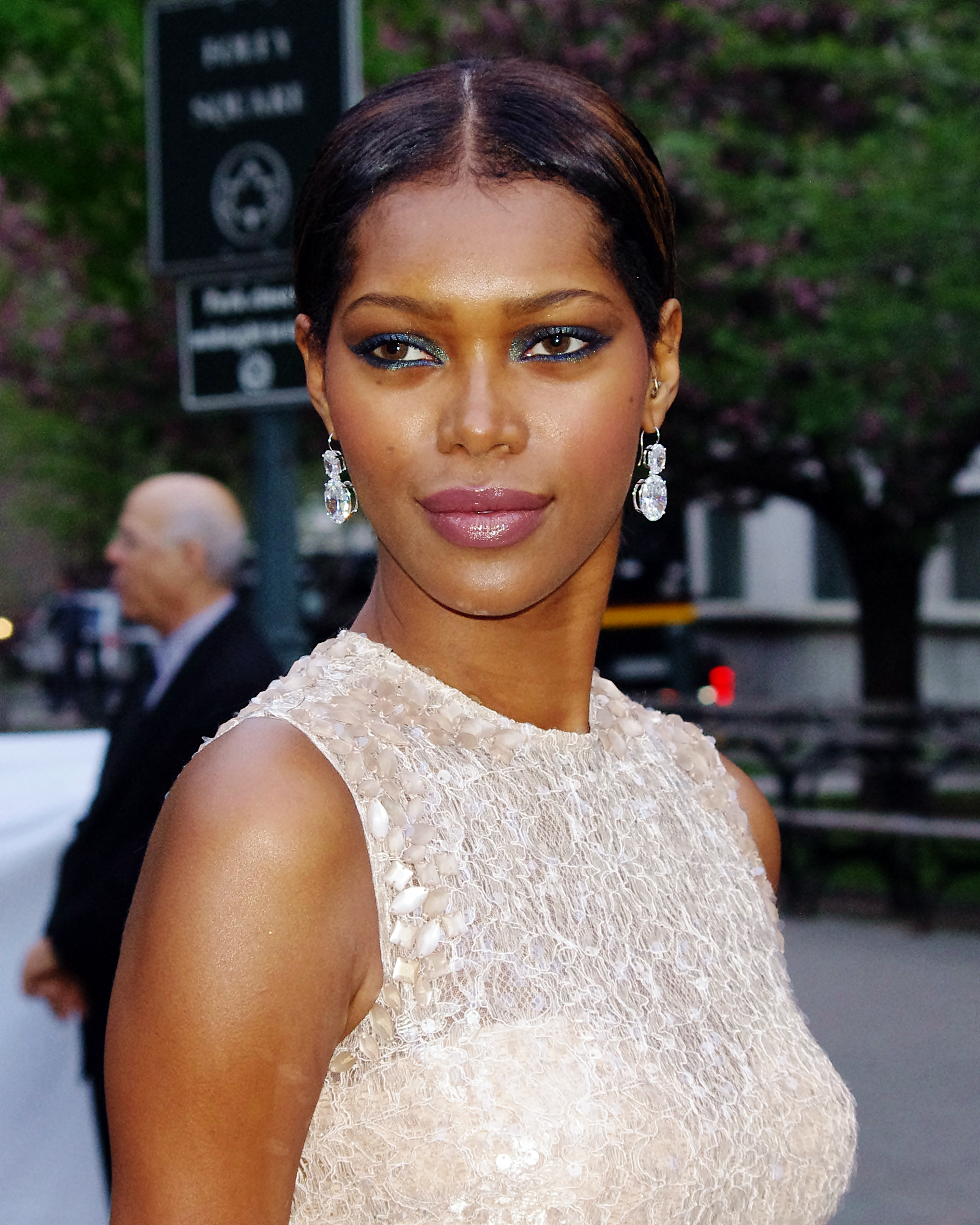
- White at Jacob's Cure 'Dream Big!' Annual Gala 2012
- Born: June 21, 1984 (age 42); Buffalo, New York, U.S.
- Education: Kensington High School
- Modeling information
- Height: 1.78 m (5 ft 10 in)
- Hair color: Black
- Eye color: Dark Brown
- Agency: Modelwerk (Hamburg); VISION Los Angeles (Los Angeles)

Jessica Angel White (born June 21, 1984) is an American fashion model, actress and television personality. She is best known for being a Victoria's Secret runway model, Maybelline spokesperson and working for CoverGirl, as well as her appearances in the Sports Illustrated Swimsuit Issues. Outside of modeling, she has appeared on several television series, such as The Young and the Restless, America's Next Top Model, Famously Single, Zoe Ever After, Hip Hop Squares and Love & Hip Hop: Atlanta.

In 2025, she married Nathan Wong and talked on her fertility struggles after having a miscarriage.

== Early life ==
White was born on June 21, 1984, in Buffalo, New York. Her father was a pastor and she sang in a church-driven girl group as a child. She attended Kensington High School.

== Career ==
At the age of 12, White was scouted in her hometown of Buffalo, New York, and had gone to Personal Best modeling school at age sixteen. After modeling for one week, her first job was an editorial for Vogue after meeting Anna Wintour. In Paris, she signed a contract with international modeling agency IMG Models. She has modeled for several magazines, including Sports Illustrated, W, Harper's Bazaar, Teen Vogue, King and Maxim. She has walked the runway for Philipp Plein, Victoria's Secret, Alice Roi, Baby Phat, Oscar de la Renta, Tracy Reese, Zang Toi, Sonia Rykiel, Alberta Ferretti, Ralph Lauren, Marc Jacobs and DKNY. She has appeared in advertisements for Chloé, CoverGirl, Gap, Maybelline, RocaWear and Tommy Jeans. She has also modeled for Joanne Gair's body painting works in these editions.

She has appeared in music videos for Big & Rich ("Comin' To Your City"), John Legend, Jay-Z ("Change Clothes"), Robin Thicke ("The Sweetest Love"), and Trey Songz ("Neighbors Know My Name"). White had a small role as Bra Model in the crime comedy film Big Momma's House 2 (2006). In 2008, she appeared as herself in two episodes of CBS's soap opera The Young and the Restless. On October 14, 2009, White appeared as a guest judge on America's Next Top Model. She appeared on E!'s reality television series Famously Single, which premiered on June 14, 2016. The series follows eight single celebrities who all move in together and try to solve their romantic relationships. She landed the role of Tammi in the romantic comedy film The Perfect Match (2016). The film grossed over $10 million worldwide.

White wrote and produced her debut single, "Bipolar Love", released under her stage name "Jypsy" on June 21, 2016.

In June 2023, White joined the main cast of the reality television series, Love & Hip Hop: Atlanta for the show's eleventh season.

== Philanthropy ==
White has created a women's philanthropic organization, Angel Wings Foundation.

== Personal life ==
White has given interviews about her cocaine addiction and her mental illness. She used cocaine to cope with the problems her mother had. She overdosed on cocaine at 20 after her battle with depression.

She is now off cocaine and considers her mother to be her best friend.

As a child, she witnessed violence and was molested by a family member. She looks to modeling as her savior saying "[it allowed me] to leave and travel to Paris and New York when I could finally relax and be out of the abusive environment."

In October 2010, White was arrested for assaulting a woman in New York City.

In 2025, she announced her marriage to Nathan Wong, but had a miscarriage, and expressed how she went through a time of depression. Calling her son as a "peaceful warrior" and wrote "I though relentssly to keep you safe, but my womb couldn't hold you."

== Filmography ==
Film roles
Year	Title	Role	Notes
2000	First, Last and Deposit	Tessa	
2003	Little Erin Merryweather	Patty Cake Girl #2	
2006	Big Momma's House 2	Bra Model	
2016	The Perfect Match	Tammi	
2018	Easter Egg	Jypsy	

Television roles
Year	Title	Role	Notes
1996	The Making of a Hollywood Madam	Young Shana Fleiss	Television film
2007	Victoria's Secret Fashion Show	Herself	TV special
2008	The Young and the Restless	Herself / model	2 episodes
2009	America's Next Top Model	Guest Judge / Supermodel	Episode: "Petite Ninja Warriors"
2015	Real Husbands of Hollywood	Herself	Episode: "Model Behavior"
2016	Famously Single	Herself	8 episodes
2016	Zoe Ever After	Herself	3 episodes
2017	Hip Hop Squares	Herself / Contestant	Episode: "Jessica White vs Joe Budden"
2017	The Climb	Copper	Amazon original series
2023–2026	Love & Hip Hop: Atlanta	Herself	Seasons 11–13
2024	Law & Order	Hailey Vonn	Episode: "Bad Apple"
2025	The Real Housewives of Atlanta	Herself	Episode: "Chicken and Waffles"

Music videos
Year	Title	Artist
2003	"Change Clothes"	Jay-Z
2005	"Comin' To Your City"	Big & Rich
2005	"So High"	John Legend
2008	"The Sweetest Love"	Robin Thicke
2009	"I Invented Sex"	Trey Songz
2009	"I Invented Sex/Say Aah"	Trey Songz
2010	"Say Aah"	Trey Songz
2010	"Neighbors Know My Name"	Trey Songz
2010	"Power"	Kanye West
2013	"XO"	Beyoncé
2025	"Chozen"	Jon B.
