= Chef Tone =

American musician

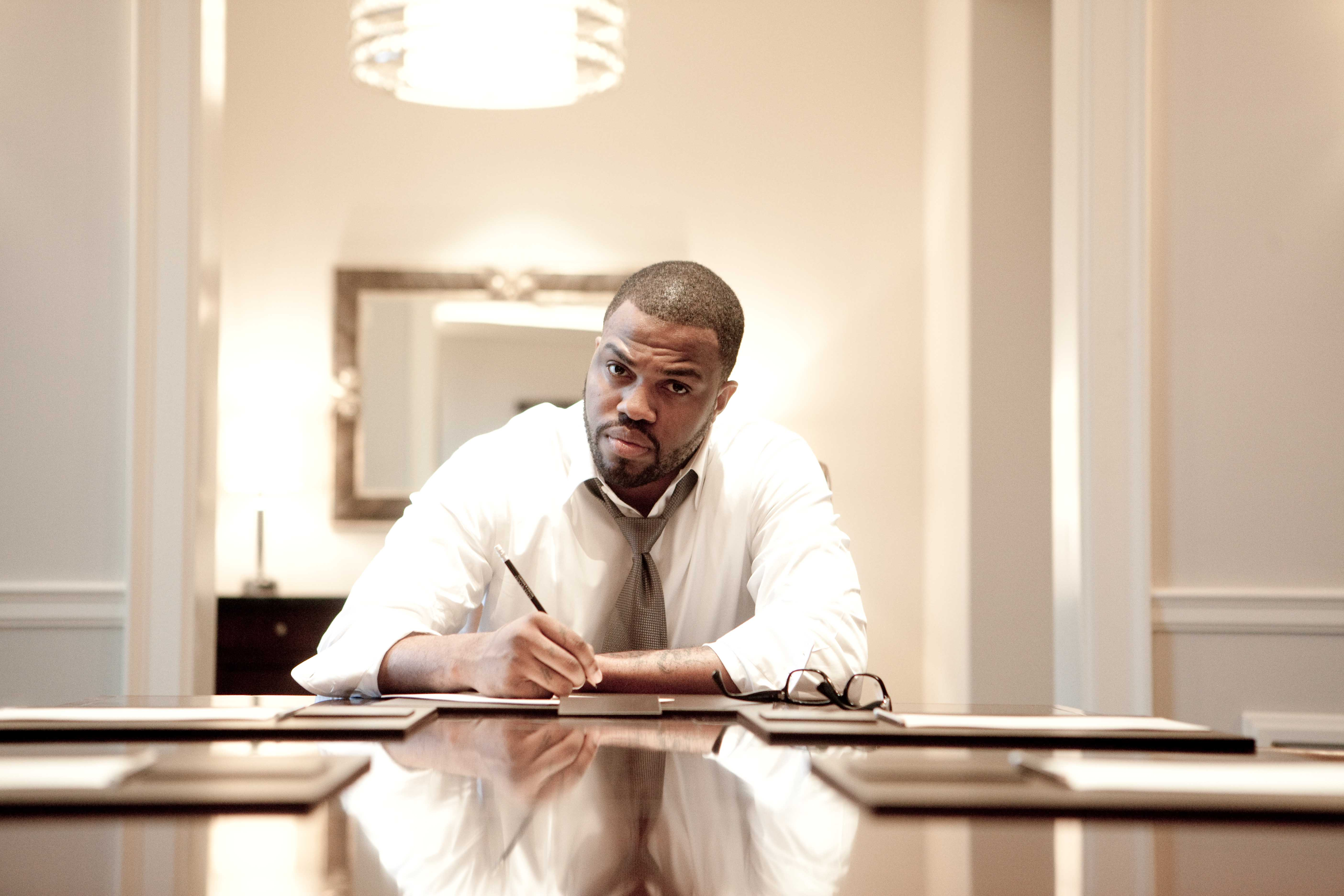
- Scales in 2011

Background information
- Born: Tony Scales; June 13, 1983 (age 43); Chicago, Illinois, U.S.
- Genres: R&B; hip hop; trap; reggae
- Occupations: Record producer; songwriter
- Instruments: Vocals; guitar; vocals; drum machine; keyboards; turntable; sampler; Ableton
- Years active: 2007–present

Tony Scales (born June 13, 1983), known professionally as Chef Tone, is an American record producer and songwriter from Chicago, Illinois. He is best known for his co-writing or producing releases from American R&B singer Trey Songz, including his 2009 single "Bottoms Up", which peaked at number six on the Billboard Hot 100. Following its success, Scales has since been credited on albums by Justin Bieber, Jamie Foxx, Dr. Dre, Plies, Jacquees, Maejor, Queen Naija, and Sean Paul, among others.

Scales received his first Grammy Award nomination (Best Contemporary R&B Album) for his contributions to the album Ready (2009) by Trey Songz, and his second (Best Reggae Album) for Full Frequency (2014) by Sean Paul. Scales is also a music executive; he founded the record label Ayy Girl Records and has signed R&B singer Wash.

== Career ==
In 2007, Scales, from Chicago, Illinois, connected with an entertainment manager and moved to Atlanta, Georgia. Within six months of relocating, Chef was offered an exclusive producer songwriter deal with Atlantic Records, the first by this label. As a songwriter, Scales's first placement was with Florida rapper Plies, on his single "Please Excuse My Hands," featuring The-Dream and Jamie Foxx. The song peaked at number 66 on the Billboard Hot 100, which led to Scales' long-term deal to write, produce, and develop talent with Atlantic Records funding. Record executive Lyor Cohen, North American chairman and CEO of Warner Music Group, specifically constructed the deal to mimic the success of the Motown-era with Scales at the helm. Scales manager at the time submitted several songs to Craig Kallman, Chairman and CEO of Atlantic Records, who then passed them on to Mike Caren, Executive Vice President of A&R for Atlantic Records. Caren immediately sent Scales to LA for a meeting, offered him a deal, and matched him with R&B recording artist Trey Songz. Their collaborations yielded the hit song "I Invented Sex", featuring Drake, on the multi-platinum certified (RIAA) Ready album, which peaked at number three on the Billboard 200 and number two on the Top R&B/Hip Hop Albums chart. Scales also penned Songz' singles "Bottoms Up," "Love Faces," "Say Aah," "Yo Side of the Bed," and "LOL :-)," which he wrote and produced, along with several other album tracks.

Scales' success with the aforementioned artists earned him a mentorship with Dr. Dre. Scales' was then credited as a songwriter on 50 Cent's 2014 single "Smoke", featuring Trey Songz, from the former's Animal Ambition album. Scales' credits expanded to include Ludacris' "Sex Room," Jamie Foxx's "Best Night of My Life" and "Gorgeous," Flo Rida's "Respirator," Sean Paul's "Entertainment" featuring Juicy J, Nicki Minaj and 2 Chainz, Maejor's "Lolly" featuring Justin Bieber and Juicy J, among others. Bieber's "Heartbreaker" topped the iTunes charts at number one in 63 countries, and peaking at number 13 on the Billboard Hot 100, becoming Scales' fastest rising release. Bieber's album Journals was released on December 23, 2013, by Island Records. It was available as a digital exclusive on online platforms.

Scales first earned his nickname on the basketball court, where he served good passes, also known as "dishes," to his teammates, his name carries through to his career in the music industry. Scales' Aye Girl Records, first launched in 2007, entered a joint venture with Interscope Records for the signing and release of American singer Wash's 2015 single, "Can't Trust Thots", featuring French Montana.

== Discography ==
Songwriting and production credits

Year	Single	Chart positions					Album
Year	Single	US Hot 100	US R&B	US Rap	US Pop	UK	Album
2008	"Please Excuse My Hands" (Plies featuring The-Dream and Jamie Foxx)	66	8	9	–	–	Definition of Real
2009	"I Invented Sex" (Trey Songz)	42	1	–	–	–	Ready
2009	"Say Aah" (Trey Songz featuring Fabolous)	9	3	–	16	–	Ready
2009	"Yo Side of the Bed" (Trey Songz)	–	–	–	–	–	Ready
2009	"LOL :-)" (Trey Songz featuring Gucci Mane and Soulja Boy)	51	12	–	–	–	Ready
2010	"Kitty Kitty" (Plies featuring Trey Songz)	–	–	–	–	–	Goon Affiliated
2010	"Best Night of My Life" (Jamie Foxx)	–	12	–	–	–	Best Night of My Life
2010	"Gorgeous" (Jamie Foxx)	–	–	–	–	–	Best Night of My Life
2010	"Strip" (T.I. featuring Young Dro and Trey Songz)	–	–	–	–	–	No Mercy
2010	"Respirator" (Flo Rida)	–	–	–	–	–	Only One Flo (Part 1)
2010	"Love Faces" (Trey Songz)	63	3	–	–	–	Passion, Pain & Pleasure
2010	"Massage" (Trey Songz)	–	–	–	–	–	Passion, Pain & Pleasure
2010	"Doorbell" (Trey Songz)	–	–	–	–	–	Passion, Pain & Pleasure
2010	"Unfortunate" (Trey Songz)	–	–	–	–	–	Passion, Pain & Pleasure
2010	"Alone" (Trey Songz)	–	–	–	–	–	Passion, Pain & Pleasure
2010	"Bottoms Up" (Trey Songz featuring Nicki Minaj)	6	2	–	11	71	Passion, Pain & Pleasure
2010	"Made to be Together" (Trey Songz)	–	–	–	–	–	Passion, Pain & Pleasure
2010	"Red Lipstick" (Trey Songz)	–	–	–	–	–	Passion, Pain & Pleasure
2010	"Blind" (Trey Songz)	–	–	–	–	–	Passion, Pain & Pleasure
2010	"I Want Her" (Majic Massey featuring Twista)	–	–	–	–	–	Love D.N.A.
2010	"Sex Room" (Ludacris featuring Trey Songz)	–	–	–	–	–	Battle of the Sexes
2010	"Dang a Lang" (Trina)	–	–	–	–	–	Amazin'
2011	"Good Good Night" (Roscoe Dash)	–	81	–	–	–	J.U.I.C.E.
2011	"Hummin" (Bobby V featuring Lloyd Banks)	–	–	–	–	–	Fly on the Wall
2011	"Be the One" (Lloyd featuring Trey Songz)	–	–	–	–	–	King of Hearts
2012	"My Bed" (Mario (entertainer))	–	–	–	–	–	Restoration
2013	"Entertainment" (Sean Paul featuring Juicy J and 2 Chainz)	–	–	–	–	–	Full Frequency
2013	"Twerk" (Justin Bieber featuring Miley Cyrus)	–	–	–	–	–	TBA
2013	"Lolly" (Maejor Ali featuring Justin Bieber and Juicy J)	19	4	–	–	56	Def Jam Single
2013	"Heartbreaker" (Justin Bieber)	13	–	–	–	14	Journals
2013	"Physical" (R. Kelly)	–	–	–	–	–	Black Panties
2013	"One Life" (Justin Bieber)	–	–	–	–	–	Journals
2014	"Smoke" (50 Cent featuring Trey Songz)	–	–	–	–	–	Animal Ambition
2014	"Remission" (Lupe Fiasco) featuring Common and Jennifer Hudson	–	–	–	–	–	Tetsuo & Youth
2014	"Me And My Team" (Maejor Ali featuring Trey Songz and Kid Ink)	–	–	–	–	–	Def Jam Single
2014	"Can't Trust Thots" (Wash featuring French Montana)	–	–	–	–	–	Where You Been
2016	"Nobody" (Pieter Oliver)	–	–	–	–	–	Intimate Friends
2016	"Where You Been" (Wash featuring Kevin Gates)	–	–	–	–	–	Where You Been
2021	"Put In Work" (Jacquees featuring Chris Brown)	–	–	–	–	–	PTOF Vol.1
2021	"Freaky As Me" (Jacquees featuring Mulatto)	–	–	–	–	–	PTOF Vol.1
2021	"Bed Friend" (Jacquees featuring Queen Naija)	–	25	–	–	–	PTOF Vol.1
