= November 18th (song) =

2009 song by Drake

Song by Drake

from the album So Far Gone
- Released: February 13, 2009
- Recorded: 2008
- Genre: Hip hop
- Length: 3:07
- Label: OVO
- Songwriter(s): Aubrey Graham; Christopher Wallace; Osten Harvey; Burt Bacharach; Hal David; Robert Davis; Jermaine Dupri; Marcus Edwards; George Canler; Wally Palamarchuk; Mike Skill; Jimmy Marinos; Peter Solley; Bernard Freeman; Chad Butler; Donald Hepburn; Bruce Smith
- Producer(s): DJ Screw

Audio video
- "November 18th" on YouTube

"November 18th" is a song by Canadian rapper and singer Drake from his third mixtape So Far Gone (2009). The song contains posthumous production credits from DJ Screw, and was released on the 13th of February, as the fifth track to the breakout mixtape.

The song only appeared on the Hot R&B/Hip-Hop Songs chart upon release, peaking at number fifty-eight in 2009. It eventually topped the Trending 140 chart in 2014, as a result of Twitter users sharing their enthusiasm for the track on the same day as the song's title.

== Background ==
The name of the song refers to the day that Drake first met Lil Wayne in Houston, Texas. He explained in an interview with Complex, "And then coincidentally, when I broke up with that girl, a week later I went to Houston and met Lil Wayne and that's where 'November 18th' comes from".

== Composition ==
The beat samples DJ Screw's chopped-and-screwed version of Kris Kross' "Da Streets Ain't Right", which in turn samples The Notorious B.I.G.'s "Warning". The song also contains an interpolation of "Pimp Tha Pen" by DJ Screw and Lil' Keke. Lil' Keke later stated that Drake paid him for the use of the lyric interpolation in an interview with Geto Boys Reloaded.

== Critical reception ==
In a review of So Far Gone, Billboard's Scott Glaysher ranked "November 18th" as the third-best song off the mixtape, behind Best I Ever Had. He calls the song a "perfect example of Drake being able to seamlessly rap and sing on the turn of a dime; one moment he’s hitting a dark croon and another he rhymes with perfect wordplay". Rose Lilah of HotNewHipHop ranked "November 18th" as the ninth-best Drake song and found the production to be "sleek and cold, appropriately matching the weather on the date in question, and Drake mirrors this style in his approach to the vocals". Complex praised the song, calling it "one of the greatest lean sing-a-long songs of the last 10 years".

== Live performances ==
Drake performed the song multiple times at Houston's Warehouse Live in 2009, later performing the song again on November 13, 2013, as a part of his third headlining tour Would You Like a Tour? In March 12, 2024, he was brought out to perform six different songs at Rodeo Houston, ending his guest appearance with "November 18th".

== Charts ==
Weekly chart performance for "November 18th"
Chart (2009)	Peak position
US Hot R&B/Hip-Hop Songs (Billboard)	58
