= I Invented Sex =

Single by Trey Songz featuring Drake

from the album Ready
- Released: October 13, 2009
- Recorded: 2009
- Studio: 11th Street Studios (Atlanta, Georgia)
- Genre: R&B; hip hop
- Length: 4:08
- Label: Atlantic; Songbook
- Songwriters: Tremaine Neverson; Aubrey Graham; Carlos McKinney; Tony "Chef Tone" Scales
- Producer: Los Da Mystro

Trey Songz singles chronology
"LOL :-)" (2009)	"I Invented Sex" (2009)	"Say Aah" (2009)

Drake singles chronology
"Money to Blow" (2009)	"I Invented Sex" (2009)	"Say Something" (2009)

"I Invented Sex" is a song by American R&B singer Trey Songz, and features Canadian recording artist Drake. Together, they wrote the song along with Tony "Chef Tone" Scales and its producer, Los Da Mystro. It was released to urban airplay as the third single from Songz's third studio album Ready on October 13, 2009. The song features a sensual message, accompanied by heavy percussion. "I Invented Sex" received positive reviews, and reached number forty-two on the Billboard Hot 100, and became Songz's first song to top the Hot R&B/Hip-Hop Songs chart. Its official remix features fellow R&B singers Keri Hilson and Usher. The accompanying music video, carrying a parental advisory warning, is the lead-up to the "Say Aah" video.

== Background ==
Speaking about the record with MTV News, Songz said, "It's a groove record. It's got that knock at the same time. It's sexy at the same time. Conceptually, it's mind-blowing to tell a woman, 'You gonna think we invented sex when we're done.' That's where I am." The song was recorded at 11th Street Studios in Atlanta, Georgia. The official remix of the song features fellow American R&B singers Usher and Keri Hilson. Another remix features Willie Taylor of R&B group Day26. R&B singer Chris Brown re-made the song on his first mixtape, In My Zone, with the title "I Invented Head."

== Composition and critical reception ==
"I Invented Sex"
A sample of "I Invented Sex" featuring vocals by Songz.

Ajitpaul Mangat of Tiny Mix Tapes said the song, along with the intro, "Panty Droppa", were "swagga-oozing" and "expertly build the mood with chopped and screwed vocals and exploding percussion, respectively." Drake's closing rap has been described as "Best I Ever Had"-esque. David Jeffries of Allmusic noted the song as a standout track from Ready. Complimenting the wide appeal of song's title, DJBooth said that, "With a high-caliber guest feature and a radio-ready sound, this single should be just the thing to boost the already-substantial sales of Songz' third album."

In the song's remix, Songz makes references to Tiger Woods, as he also refers to "going in like a Lil Wayne-Drake song." DJBooth said that Songz sings alongside "Usher, who basically invented the modern sexual r&b blueprint that Songz is following, and Hilson, who more than holds her own alongside the boys with some scintillating vocals and hilarious 'soldier at attention' sexual entendres." The review goes on to state, "These three may not have invented sex, but they sure make listening to music while having sex more enjoyable."

== Chart performance ==
On the week ending November 7, 2009, "I Invented Sex" debuted at number ninety on the Billboard Hot 100. The following week, it moved up to eighty, and eventually peaked at forty-two. It spent twenty weeks on the chart over 2009–10, eventually falling off the chart in the week ending March 10, 2010. The song also topped the Hot R&B/Hip-Hop Songs, making it Songz's first number one on the chart.

== Music video ==
The music video was directed by Yolande Geralds, who also directed the video for "Say Aah". Jessica White appears in the video once again while Drake does not appear in it. The video carries a parental advisory warning. A combination video was released for the clips of "I Invented Sex" and "Say Aah", as they were later released separately. Songz confirmed to MTV News that the previous would be a continuation of the latter. On the "I Invented Sex" clip, Songz said, "It's very sensual. The idea I had, it came from a banned Calvin Klein ad. It was a dude and two girls and they was touching and kissing. I was like, 'Man, I wanna do that.' We didn't go all the way there. I didn't have two girls — we simulated best we could, and it's more sensual than raunchy.". It ranked at number twenty-two on BET: Notarized Top 100 Videos of 2009 countdown.

== Live performances ==
Songz performed "I Invented Sex" on Jimmy Kimmel Live! on December 1, 2009 and on 106 & Park on December 11, 2009. The song was then performed again with "Say Aah" on It's On with Alexa Chung, and then on The Mo'Nique Show In January, both Songz and Drake appeared at West Hollywood's House of Blues to perform the song. As a part of a medley with one of his musical influences, Stevie Wonder, "I Invented Sex" was sung at the 2010 BET Honors on February 1, 2010. He performed the song once again on 106 & Park on February 11, 2010 for "Love Week" with a medley of "Neighbors Know My Name", and "Say Aah". He again performed it in March 2010 at MTV's Spring Break 2010, in Acapulco, Mexico. Keri Hilson and Usher joined Songz to perform the official remix at WHTA's Jingle Ball in December 2009.

== Credits and personnel ==
- Trey Songz – songwriting
- Drake – songwriting
- Los Da Mystro – songwriting, production, all instruments
- Tony Scales – songwriting
- Scott Naughton – engineering, Recording
- Jaycen-Joshua Fowler – mixing
- Dave Pensado – mixing
- Giancarlo Lino – mixing assistant

== Charts ==
=== Weekly charts ===
Chart (2009–2010)	Peak position
US Billboard Hot 100	42
US Hot R&B/Hip-Hop Songs (Billboard)	1

=== Year-end charts ===
Chart (2009)	Position
US Hot R&B/Hip-Hop Songs (Billboard)	77
Chart (2010)	Position
US Hot R&B/Hip-Hop Songs (Billboard)	12

== Certifications ==
Certifications for "I Invented Sex"
Region	Certification	Certified units/sales
New Zealand (RMNZ)	Gold	15,000^{‡}
^{‡} Sales+streaming figures based on certification alone.

== Release history ==
Region	Date	Format
United States	October 13, 2009	Urban airplay

== See also ==
- List of R&B number-one singles of 2009 (U.S.)
