= Wash (singer) =

- Born: Ronald Washington Jr. Port Arthur, Texas, U.S.
- Origin: Atlanta, Georgia, U.S.
- Genres: R&B
- Occupation: Rapper
- Instrument: Vocals
- Years active: 2013–present
- Label: Interscope

Ronald Washington Jr., better known by his stage name Wash, is an American singer.

== Life and career ==
Ronald Washington Jr. grew up in Port Arthur, Texas. His parents were both pastors, who encouraged him to learn to play drums. He later learned to play saxophone and piano. His stage name, Wash, originated as abbreviation of his surname. In between working as a welder and scaffold builder, Wash uploaded covers of songs onto the internet, which came to the attention of Don "Frame" Howard of L7 Entertainment and Frame introduced a Washington to Chef Tone. Wash was brought to Tone's Ayy Girl Music Group in 2013, and was signed to Interscope Records in 2014.

On September 30, 2014 Wash's first single, titled "Can't Trust Thots" and featuring American rapper French Montana, was released. In 2015, it reached numbers 35 and 44 on the US Billboard Rhythmic and Hot R&B/Hip-Hop Airplay charts, respectively.

In a January 2015 interview with Billboard, Wash said he would be releasing a mixtape titled Five Miles to Port Arthur by the end of March 2015. On June 17, 2016, Wash released the single "Where You Been", featuring American rapper Kevin Gates.

== Musical style and influences ==
David Jeffries of AllMusic describes Wash's style as predominantly R&B with nuances of hip hop music. Wash has mentioned Marvin Gaye, R. Kelly and Usher as influences.
