= List of number-one R&B/hip-hop songs of 2009 (U.S.) =

The Billboard Hot R&B/Hip-Hop Songs chart ranks the best-performing singles in that category in the United States. The first number one song of the year was claimed by Beyoncé with "Single Ladies (Put a Ring on It)". The song remained at the peak position in 2009 for a further six consecutive weeks, and it ranked as the number six song on Billboard's Hot R&B/Hip-Hop Songs year-end list. "Single Ladies (Put a Ring on It)" was replaced by Jamie Foxx's song "Blame It", featuring T-Pain, after it had spent twelve consecutive weeks atop the chart throughout late 2008 and early 2009. "Blame It" topped the chart for fourteen consecutive weeks, and it ranked as the number one song on Billboard's Hot R&B/Hip-Hop Songs year-end list.

Jeremih's "Birthday Sex" topped the chart for two consecutive weeks. "Birthday Sex" ranked as the number twenty song on the Hot R&B/Hip-Hop Songs year end list. This was followed by Keri Hilson's song "Knock You Down", featuring Kanye West and Ne-Yo, which also peaked at number one for two consecutive weeks. "Knock You Down" ranked as the number eleven song on the Hot R&B/Hip-Hop Songs year end list. Drake's song "Best I Ever Had" spent seven weeks atop the chart. "Best I Ever Had" ranked at number four on the Hot R&B/Hip-Hop Songs year end list. He was succeeded by Maxwell's song "Pretty Wings", which spent fourteen consecutive weeks atop the chart. "Pretty Wings" ranked at number two on the Hot R&B/Hip-Hop Songs year end list. Jay-Z's collaboration featuring Alicia Keys, "Empire State of Mind", spent three weeks at number one. "Papers" by Usher peaked at number one for two weeks. The last song to peak at number one in 2009 was Trey Songz's song "I Invented Sex" featuring Drake.

== List ==
Key
†	Indicates best charting R&B single of 2009; Note: Year-end most popular R&B and hip-hop songs, ranked by radio airplay audience impressions as measured by Nielsen BDS and sales data as compiled Nielsen SoundScan

Issue date	Song	Artist(s)	Ref.
January 3	"Single Ladies (Put a Ring on It)"	Beyoncé	
January 10	"Single Ladies (Put a Ring on It)"	Beyoncé	
January 17	"Single Ladies (Put a Ring on It)"	Beyoncé	
January 24	"Single Ladies (Put a Ring on It)"	Beyoncé	
January 31	"Single Ladies (Put a Ring on It)"	Beyoncé	
February 7	"Single Ladies (Put a Ring on It)"	Beyoncé	
February 14	"Single Ladies (Put a Ring on It)"	Beyoncé	
February 21	"Blame It" †	Jamie Foxx featuring T-Pain	
February 28	"Blame It" †	Jamie Foxx featuring T-Pain	
March 7	"Blame It" †	Jamie Foxx featuring T-Pain	
March 14	"Blame It" †	Jamie Foxx featuring T-Pain	
March 21	"Blame It" †	Jamie Foxx featuring T-Pain	
March 28	"Blame It" †	Jamie Foxx featuring T-Pain	
April 4	"Blame It" †	Jamie Foxx featuring T-Pain	
April 11	"Blame It" †	Jamie Foxx featuring T-Pain	
April 18	"Blame It" †	Jamie Foxx featuring T-Pain	
April 25	"Blame It" †	Jamie Foxx featuring T-Pain	
May 2	"Blame It" †	Jamie Foxx featuring T-Pain	
May 9	"Blame It" †	Jamie Foxx featuring T-Pain	
May 16	"Blame It" †	Jamie Foxx featuring T-Pain	
May 23	"Blame It" †	Jamie Foxx featuring T-Pain	
May 30	"Birthday Sex"	Jeremih	
June 6	"Birthday Sex"	Jeremih	
June 13	"Knock You Down"	Keri Hilson featuring Kanye West and Ne-Yo	
June 20	"Knock You Down"	Keri Hilson featuring Kanye West and Ne-Yo	
June 27	"Best I Ever Had"	Drake	
July 4	"Best I Ever Had"	Drake	
July 11	"Best I Ever Had"	Drake	
July 18	"Best I Ever Had"	Drake	
July 25	"Best I Ever Had"	Drake	
August 1	"Best I Ever Had"	Drake	
August 8	"Best I Ever Had"	Drake	
August 15	"Pretty Wings"	Maxwell	
August 22	"Pretty Wings"	Maxwell	
August 29	"Pretty Wings"	Maxwell	
September 5	"Pretty Wings"	Maxwell	
September 12	"Pretty Wings"	Maxwell	
September 19	"Pretty Wings"	Maxwell	
September 26	"Pretty Wings"	Maxwell	
October 3	"Pretty Wings"	Maxwell	
October 10	"Pretty Wings"	Maxwell	
October 17	"Pretty Wings"	Maxwell	
October 24	"Pretty Wings"	Maxwell	
October 31	"Pretty Wings"	Maxwell	
November 7	"Pretty Wings"	Maxwell	
November 14	"Pretty Wings"	Maxwell	
November 21	"Empire State of Mind"	Jay-Z featuring Alicia Keys	
November 28	"Empire State of Mind"	Jay-Z featuring Alicia Keys	
December 5	"Empire State of Mind"	Jay-Z featuring Alicia Keys	
December 12	"Papers"	Usher	
December 19	"Papers"	Usher	
December 26	"I Invented Sex"	Trey Songz featuring Drake	

== See also ==
- 2009 in music
- Billboard Year-End Hot R&B/Hip-Hop Songs of 2009
- List of number-one rhythm and blues hits (United States)
