= Can't Trust Thots =

Single by Wash featuring French Montana
- Released: September 30, 2014
- Length: 3:34
- Label: Aye Girl; Interscope; Polydor
- Songwriter(s): Kevin Briggs, Kandi Burruss, Tameka Cottle, Brandon Green, Karim Kharbouch, Tony E. Scales
- Producer(s): Maejor

"Can't Trust Thots" is a song by American singer Wash featuring American rapper French Montana. It was released on September 30, 2014, by Aye Girl Group, Interscope Records and Polydor Records. A remix featuring Waka Flocka Flame instead of Montana was released in March 2015.

== Release and reception ==
"Can't Trust Thots" was released by Aye Girl Group, Interscope Records and Polydor Records as a music download on September 30, 2014, Aye Girl and Interscope sent it to US rhythmic contemporary radio on November 18, 2014. In 2015, "Can't Trust Thots" reached number 35 on the US Billboard Rhythmic chart and number 44 on the Hot R&B/Hip-Hop Airplay chart.

== Charts ==
Weekly chart performance for "Can't Trust Thots"
Chart (2015)	Peak position
US Bubbling Under R&B/Hip-Hop Singles (Billboard)	3

== Certifications ==
certifications for "Can't Trust Thots"
Region	Certification	Certified units/sales
New Zealand (RMNZ)	Gold	15,000^{‡}
^{‡} Sales+streaming figures based on certification alone.
