= Neighbors Know My Name =

Single by Trey Songz

from the album Ready
- Released: February 16, 2010
- Recorded: 2009
- Studio: D2 Music Studios (Atlanta, Georgia)
- Genre: R&B
- Length: 3:06
- Label: Atlantic; Songbook
- Songwriters: Tremaine Neverson; Troy Taylor; Patrick Hayes; 7illin’; John McGee
- Producers: Troy Taylor; Patrick Hayes; $K; 7illin’

Trey Songz singles chronology
"Say Aah" (2010)	"Neighbors Know My Name" (2010)	"We Got Hood Love" (2010)

"Neighbors Know My Name" is a song by American R&B singer Trey Songz. It was written by Songz with Patrick Hayes and Troy Taylor, who produced the song with John "$K" McGee. It was released to rhythmic and urban airplay on February 16, 2010, as the fifth and final single from his third studio album, Ready (2009). The song, described as being hook-heavy and having a powerful bassline, received generally positive reviews from critics. The song reached forty-three on the Billboard Hot 100 and four on the Hot R&B/Hip-Hop Songs chart, becoming Songz's third consecutive top five R&B/Hip-Hop hit.

== Composition and critical reception ==
"Neighbors Know My Name"
A sample of "Neighbors Know My Name", featuring a "knocking bassline."

Melanie Bertoldi of Billboard gave the song a positive review, stating, "he utilizes his vocal range here, including the teasing falsetto with which he gently instructs his partner to 'take this pillow right here/If you bite it, they won't hear.' Bertoldi also complimented the song's production, commenting, "'Neighbors' employs a knocking bassline and drip-drop effect to provide the ideal erotic backdrop for Songz's dirty talk." She also pointed out that the song was inspired by Songz's "stylistic antecedent", R. Kelly. Mark Edward Nero of About.com also said the song was R. Kelly influenced, calling the song among the album's best material. Nero said, "Trey brags about how the people next door probably know who he is because his woman screams it during sex. 'While I be bangin' on your body, they be bangin' on our wall,' he sings. 'While they be dreamin', you be screamin', now they bangin' on our door.'" Ready album reviews from Allmusic and PopMatters, noted the track as a standout, with Tyler Lewis of the latter stating the "good" songs like "Neighbors" and "I Need A Girl" "thump as they should". Ken Capobianco of the Boston Globe complimented the song's braggadocio along with "I Invented Sex", however commented that the song was "unintentionally humorous". Andrew Rennie of Now Magazine said the album's hook-heavy and playful style was evident on the track and on "LOL".

== Chart performance ==
On the week ending March 13, 2010, "Neighbors Know My Name" debuted at eighty-eight on the Billboard Hot 100. A little over a month later, on the week ending May 15, 2010, it peaked at forty-three on the chart. In its twenty-seventh week on the chart, "Neighbors Know My Name" peaked at the top spot on the Hot R&B/Hip-Hop Songs chart, becoming his fourth top ten single from Ready and his third consecutive top five hit.

== Music video ==
The video was directed by Yolande Geralds, also director for the "I Invented Sex and Say Aah videos. Teairra Mari, D. Woods, and Shanell were reported to have cameos, but the scenes were evidently cut. The video premiered on March 1, 2010. On March 3, 2010, the video was "The New Joint of the Day" on BET's 106 & Park. The music video starts off with an intimate milk bath scene with Trey Songz and model-actress, Jessica White along with the song "Panty Droppa", the intro track on Ready, played in the background. It then branches off into "Neighbors Know My Name" playing in the background with the rest of the music video taking place in a bedroom with love scenes of both Songz and White. Some scenes also include Trey Songz in front of a red background.

== Live performances ==
He performed the song on 106 & Park on February 11, 2010 for "Love Week" with a medley of "Say Aah", and "I Invented Sex".

== Credits and personnel ==
- Songwriting - Trey Songz, Troy Taylor, 7illin, Patrick Hayes
- Production - 7illin, Troy Taylor, Patrick Hayes
- Recording - John McGee
- Mixing - Jean Marie Horvat

== Charts ==
=== Weekly charts ===
Weekly chart performance
Chart (2010)	Peak position
US Billboard Hot 100	43
US Hot R&B/Hip-Hop Songs (Billboard)	4
US Rhythmic Airplay (Billboard)	22

=== Year-end charts ===
Annual chart rankings
Chart (2010)	Position
US Hot R&B/Hip-Hop Songs (Billboard)	6
US Radio Songs (Billboard)	74

== Certifications ==
Region	Certification	Certified units/sales
United States (RIAA)	Gold	500,000^{‡}
^{‡} Sales+streaming figures based on certification alone.

== Release history ==
Region	Date	Format
United States	February 16, 2010	Rhythmic and urban airplay
