= Alice Roi =

American fashion designer

Alice Roi (born Alice Roy Blumenthal in 1975 or 1976) is an American fashion designer. Her work has appeared in magazines such as Bazaar, Elle, Nylon, and in stores including Henri Bendel (New York), Beauty Buy (Paris), and Joyce (Hong Kong). She was nominated for the CFDA Perry Ellis Award for Womenswear in 2001.

== Education ==
Her father, Jerry Blumenthal, died when she was 12. Her mother Naomi runs The Inn at Irving Place. She developed her love for fashion as a young child, putting on fashion shows for family and friends and putting together outfits.

After graduating from Friends Seminary, she earned a bachelor's degree in Fine Arts from New York University, and continued her studies at Parsons School of Design.

== Career ==
Following a stint at Elle magazine, she worked as a fashion consultant. Wanting to be more creative, she set up her own design house and launched her collection in New York 1999. Roi's collection was quickly picked up by Kirna Zabete in New York.

Her "punky yet girlish" look developed a following.

Cathy Horyn of The New York Times praised her for the "unique world" created by her "a delicious sartorial joke sense that has grown more and more sophisticated".

In 2007, she worked with Uniqlo.

In 2008, Roi, Laura Poretzky and Shoshanna Lonstein Gruss collaborated on a Supergirl line for Warner Brothers. She has dressed celebrities such as Liv Tyler and Mary Lynn Rajskub of 24.
