= LOL Smiley Face =

"LOL :-)"
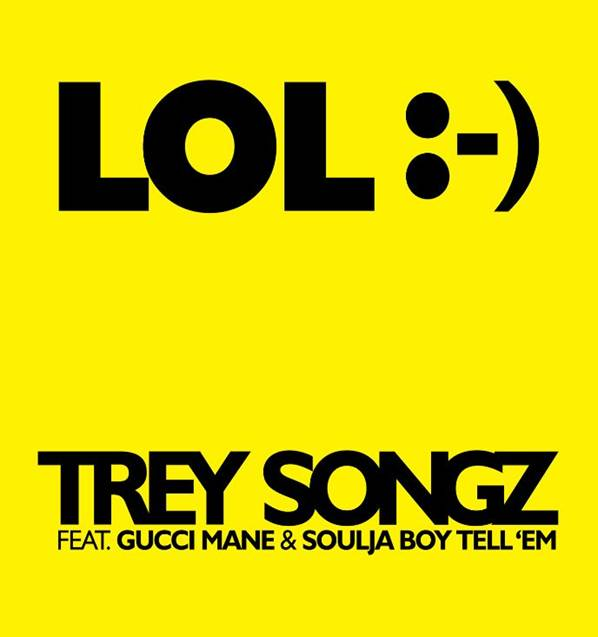

Single by Trey Songz featuring Gucci Mane and Soulja Boy Tellem

from the album Ready
- Released: August 24, 2009
- Studio: D2 Music Studios; Doppler Studios; Patchwerk Studios (Atlanta, Georgia)
- Genre: R&B; electropop; pop-rap
- Length: 4:08
- Label: Atlantic; Troy Taylor
- Songwriters: Tremaine Neverson; Troy Taylor; Tony Scales; DeAndre Way; Radric Davis
- Producers: Troy Taylor; Tony Scales

Trey Songz singles chronology
"Successful" (2009)	"LOL :-)" (2009)	"I Invented Sex" (2009)

Soulja Boy Tellem singles chronology
"Turn My Swag On" (2009)	"LOL Smiley Face" (2009)	"Pronto" (2009)

Gucci Mane singles chronology
"Wasted" (2009)	"LOL Smiley Face" (2009)	"I Get It In" (2009)

"LOL Smiley Face" (styled as "LOL :-)") is a song by American recording artist Trey Songz. It features rappers Gucci Mane and Soulja Boy and serves as the second single from Songz' third studio album, Ready. The artists co-wrote the song with its producers Troy Taylor and Tony Scales. "LOL Smiley Face" is an R&B song featuring bouncy, poppy synths, and lyrically refers to sexting and other electronic multimedia messaging. The song was released as the second single from Songz's third album Ready on August 24, 2009.

The song received generally positive reviews from critics, who noted its catchy melody. The song peaked at number fifty-one on the Billboard Hot 100 and number twelve on the Hot R&B/Hip-Hop Songs chart. Rather than releasing a traditional music video, a montage of fans singing and dancing to the track was released.

== Background ==
The song was recorded in Atlanta, Georgia, at three different studios, Doppler Studios, Patchwerk Studios and D2 Music Studios. "LOL" was written by its performers, Trey Songz, Gucci Mane and Soulja Boy, and its producers, Troy Taylor and Tony Scales also contributed to the writing process. Taylor recorded the track while Jean Marie Horvat mixed the song.

When speaking on the conceptual basis of Ready, Songz said, "You think about a record like 'LOL Smiley Face,' it's something real simple, but when you look at the title or listen to the record, you're like, 'Wow.' That's something great from a songwriter's perspective. I'm just trying to make hits and classic records that people can vibe to and live their life." In an interview with BallerStatus, Songz commented on his thoughts of making a remix of the song, stating, "I think there's going to be a remix for that song, because a lot of people dig it. A lot of people have hit me up actually about it. That song is blowing up real fast man." He also stated the possibility of American rapper Nicki Minaj appearing on a remix, saying, "She wanted to do more of a commercial record, a cuter sex record. 'LOL' was actually already done, but when she heard it, she hit me up, and said 'I love that song. You're a punk for not putting me on it.' She'll definitely be on the remix." However no remix was seen to be in the works nor did it come to fruition.

== Composition ==
"LOL Smiley Face"
A sample of "LOL Smiley Face" described to be built around "music-box" synths.

The song is derived from R&B, pop and hip hop music. It is backed with heavy percussion and smooth vocals. According to Andrew Rennie of NOW, the song, along with "Neighbors Know My Name", continues Songz's usage of his hook-heavy and playful style. Ajitpaul Mangat of Tiny Mix Tapes called the chorus "ringtone ready." The song is lyrically about sexting, as verses talk about tales of "wired romance." Its lyrics contain references to Twitter, TwitPic, MySpace, and BlackBerry, and Soulja Boy's line contains a reference to his song "Kiss Me Thru the Phone." According to Mark Edward Nero of About.com, the song is aimed at teenage girls. Ken Capobianco of The Boston Globe said that Ready was built about the "popping tracks" of "LOL Smiley Face" and "Say Aah".

== Critical reception ==
Although Mark Edward Nero of About.com called the song "gimmicky", he said it was "catchy" and "addictive", commenting that the song "actually deserves creativity points: it's a silly, lighthearted song that's not meant to be taken seriously." Tyler Lewis of PopMatters called the song silly, and in an album review, commented, "The less said about “LOL :)”, the better", calling the listening experience "frustrating." Ajitpaul Mangat of Tiny Mix Tapes said that in the song, "we have a genuinely novel pop music moment: a booty call (an R&B staple) that only this generation can relate to." Mangat also commended the song's beat, chorus, and Soulja Boy's cameo, commenting, "In the end, it is all somehow apropos." Chris Ryan of MTV Buzzworthy said the song had an "irrefutably catchy melody", and complimented the song because of the appearance of Gucci Mane and Soulja Boy, stating, "it's incredibly playful, as any song about texting should be." Melanie Fried of Billboard called "LOL Smiley Face" "the most absurdly appealing, tech-savvy song of the year to date", commenting "Anyone younger than 15 is already texting their friends about their new favorite song."

== Chart performance ==
On the week ending September 19, 2009, "LOL" debuted on the Billboard Hot 100 at number fifty-one, the second highest debut of the week behind Breaking Benjamin's "I Will Not Bow". The song peaked at its entry position, remaining on the chart for eight weeks. At the time "LOL" was Songz's second biggest hit overall, only behind his breakthrough single "Can't Help but Wait." On the week labeled October 10, 2009, the song peaked at number twelve on the Hot R&B/Hip-Hop Songs chart, as Songz's seventh overall and fifth top twenty entry on the chart.

== Performance and music video ==
Songz and Drake performed the song on music video show 106 & Park on September 2, 2009 as a part of a medley with "I Need a Girl" and "Successful." Instead of releasing a typical video for the song, the accompanying clip features fans singing and dancing along to the clip, as well as tweeting and texting the title. The video was released online on November 25, 2009.

== Credits and personnel ==
- Songwriting – Trey Songz, Gucci Mane, Soulja Boy, Tony Scales, Troy Taylor
- Production – Troy Taylor, Tony Scales
- Recording – Troy Taylor
- Mixing – Jean Marie

Horvat Source

== Charts ==
=== Weekly charts ===
Chart (2009)	Peak position
US Billboard Hot 100	51
US Hot R&B/Hip-Hop Songs (Billboard)	12

=== Year-end charts ===
Chart (2009)	Position
US Hot R&B/Hip-Hop Songs (Billboard)	81

== Release history ==
Region	Date	Format
United States	August 24, 2009	Urban airplay
