= So Far Gone (EP) =

EP by Drake
- Released: September 15, 2009
- Genre: Hip hop
- Length: 33:50
- Labels: Cash Money; Universal Motown; Young Money
- Producers: 40; Boi-1da; Needlz; DJ Khalil

Drake chronology
So Far Gone (2009)	So Far Gone (2009)	Thank Me Later (2010)

Singles from So Far Gone
- 1. "Best I Ever Had" Released: February 13, 2009; 2. "Successful" Released: February 13, 2009; 3. "I'm Goin' In" Released: October 27, 2009

So Far Gone is the debut extended play by Canadian rapper Drake. It was released on September 15, 2009 by Cash Money Records, Universal Motown Records and Young Money Entertainment. This is his reissued project from his third mixtape that was released earlier on February 13, 2009. This EP features five tracks from the mixtape, with the inclusions of two new songs. The EP features guest appearances from Trey Songz, Lil Wayne, Bun B and Young Jeezy. The EP was supported by three singles: "Best I Ever Had", "Successful" featuring Trey Songz and Lil Wayne, and "I'm Goin' In" featuring Lil Wayne and Young Jeezy. In April 2010, the EP won the Rap Recording of the Year at the 2010 Juno Awards.

== Background ==
So Far Gone was the reissued project from Drake's third mixtape that was released earlier, on February 13, 2009, and as a result of the mixtape's success, he created an EP that was re-released later, on September 15, 2009. The final track listing, however, cuts the seventeen-track mixtape to contain seven tracks for this reissued EP. The tracks from the EP titled "Fear" and "I'm Goin' In" were the only new songs to be included to this project. "Fear" serves as the transition song between So Far Gone and his debut studio album Thank Me Later (2010). Drake described the song in an interview with MTV as "eerie", and mentioned that "the last line of the third verse is gonna be the first line on my album [Thank Me Later]".

== Singles ==
"Best I Ever Had" was released as the first single, which released seven months prior to the release of the EP as a digital download from his mixtape to the same name. The song was released as an official single on June 16, 2009. The single became one of Drake's most successful songs to date, and charted for 24 weeks, while peaking at number 2 on the US Billboard Hot 100. The single also managed to peak at number one on both the US Top R&B/Hip-Hop Songs and the Top Rap Songs charts, thus becoming Drake's first number one hit on both of these charts. The song was certified platinum by the Recording Industry Association of America (RIAA), indicating the sales of 1,000,000 copies in the United States.

"Successful" was released as the second single from So Far Gone. The single managed to peak at number 17 on the US Billboard Hot 100 and spent a total of 18 weeks on the chart. The song also reached the top five on both the Top R&B/Hip-Hop and Top Rap Songs charts, peaking at number 3 and number 2 respectively. This single was certified gold by the Recording Industry Association of America (RIAA), indicating the sales of 500,000 copies in the United States.

"I'm Goin' In" charted and peaked at number 40 the week after the EP was released, and was later sent to urban radio as the album's third single on October 27, 2009. It managed to remain on the US Billboard Hot 100 for seventeen weeks. The single was later certified platinum by the Recording Industry Association of America (RIAA), indicating the sales of 1,000,000 copies in the United States.

== Critical response ==
Professional ratings
Aggregate scores
Source	Rating
Metacritic	81/100
Review scores
Source	Rating
Allmusic	4/5 stars
Entertainment Weekly	B
PopMatters	6/10
RapReviews	9/10
Village Voice	favorable

Overall the EP has received generally positive reviews from music critics. On Metacritic, the album has received an average score of 81 which indicates "universal acclaim". RapReviews.com reviewed the album positively and commented on the EP by saying "The songs that were already previously available on "So Far Gone" are a winner and the new songs don't bring Drake down off the high cloud he's already on". All Music Guide also reviewed the EP positively and said "So Far Gone shows that Drake is for real, and works as a tantalizing teaser for his first full-length record." Entertainment Weekly gave So Far Gone a positive review, and commented on the EP by saying "For those unfamiliar with Drake's ambidextrous style - crooning Auto-Tune love songs one moment, spitting clever bars the next - it's a handy primer. Everyone else can put the neurosis-exploring new cut Fear on repeat and continue anticipating". However, PopMatters gave the album a mixed review and pointed out that musically, "I'm Goin' In" was the "weak link" in the EP.

== Commercial performance ==
The EP debuted at number six on the Billboard 200, with first-week sales of 73,000 copies in the United States. It dropped in the second week to number nine, with the sales of 36,000, totalling 109,000 copies sold. As of 2022, it is Drake's lowest-selling project. On June 30, 2010, the EP was certified gold by the Recording Industry Association of America (RIAA) for shipments of 500,000 copies in the United States. As of August 2016, the album has sold 785,000 copies in the United States.

== Track listing ==
No.	Title	Writer(s)	Producer(s)	Length
1.	"Houstatlantavegas"	Aubrey Graham; Noah Shebib	40	4:50
2.	"Successful" (featuring Trey Songz and Lil Wayne)	Graham; Shebib; Tremaine Neverson; Dwayne Carter Jr.	40	5:51
3.	"Best I Ever Had"	Graham; Matthew Samuels; Danny Hamilton; Carter Jr.	Boi-1da	4:17
4.	"Uptown" (featuring Bun B and Lil Wayne)	Graham; Carter Jr.; Bernard Freeman; Samuels; Jeremy McArthur; William Joel	Boi-1da	6:21
5.	"I'm Goin' In" (featuring Lil Wayne and Young Jeezy)	Graham; Carter Jr.; Jay Jenkins	Needlz	3:45
6.	"The Calm"	Graham; Shebib	40	4:06
7.	"Fear"	Graham; Khalil Rahman	DJ Khalil	4:40
Total length:				33:50

Sample credits

- "Best I Ever Had" samples "Fallin' in Love" by Hamilton, Joe Frank & Reynolds.
- "Uptown" samples "Uptown Girl" by Billy Joel.

== Charts ==
=== Weekly charts ===
Chart (2009)	Peak position
Canadian Albums (Billboard)	15
US Billboard 200	6
US Top R&B/Hip-Hop Albums (Billboard)	3
US Top Rap Albums (Billboard)	2

=== Year-end charts ===
Chart (2009)	Position
US Billboard 200	137
US Top R&B/Hip-Hop Albums (Billboard)	41

Chart (2010)	Position
US Billboard 200	122
US Top R&B/Hip-Hop Albums (Billboard)	31

== Certifications ==
Region	Certification	Certified units/sales
Canada (Music Canada)	Gold	40,000^{‡}
New Zealand (RMNZ)	Gold	7,500^{‡}
United States (RIAA)	3× Platinum	3,000,000^{‡}
^{‡} Sales+streaming figures based on certification alone.
