= Ready (Trey Songz album) =

Studio album by Trey Songz
- Released: August 31, 2009
- Recorded: 2008–09
- Genre: R&B
- Length: 58:10
- Labels: Songbook; Atlantic
- Producers: Bei Maejor; Johntá Austin; Bryan-Michael Cox; Sean Garrett; Eric Hudson; Soundz; StarGate; Troy Taylor; Los da Mystro; John "$K" McGee

Trey Songz chronology
Anticipation (2009)	Ready (2009)	Passion, Pain & Pleasure (2010)

Singles from Ready
- 1. "Successful" Released: February 13, 2009; 2. "I Need a Girl" Released: April 14, 2009; 3. "LOL :-)" Released: August 24, 2009; 4. "I Invented Sex" Released: October 13, 2009; 5. "Say Aah" Released: January 12, 2010; 6. "Neighbors Know My Name" Released: February 16, 2010

Ready is the third album by the American R&B recording artist Trey Songz. It was released on August 31, 2009, by Troy Taylor's record label Songbook, distributed by Atlantic Records. The album serves as the sequel to Trey Day (2007). Taylor produced the album during 2008–2009 along with Bryan-Michael Cox, StarGate and Los da Mystro, among others.

The album received generally positive reviews from critics, which positively compared Ready to the work of R. Kelly, but also was criticized for this album's inconsistency. The album debuted at number 3 on the US Billboard 200, selling 131,000 copies in its first week. The album was a certified gold by the Recording Industry Association of America (RIAA), becoming Songz's first certified album. 4 years later, Ready was certified platinum by the Recording Industry Association of America (RIAA).

The album was supported by five singles, including the top ten Billboard Hot 100 hit "Say Aah", and the top five Hot R&B/Hip-Hop Songs hits "Neighbors Know My Name" and "I Invented Sex", the latter of which topped the chart. Songz promoted Ready in a number of live appearances, including co-heading the 106 & Live tour, sponsored by 106 & Park, and serving as a support act on Jay-Z's The Blueprint 3 Tour. Ready earned Songz a Grammy Award nomination for Best Contemporary R&B Album at the 52nd Grammy Awards; but lost to Beyoncé Knowles' I Am... Sasha Fierce.

== Background and production ==
When Songz began recording for Ready; the purpose of the album was to crossover and increase his exposure on radio. The album's lead single, "I Need a Girl" was released to connect to mainstream radio. Songz said that "[it] was a very radio-geared record which would do great and play on radio heavily during whatever time. It wasn't a record I expected to last forever, or one I was even excited about singing, but it was a record I knew would do well." Speaking of the following singles, Songz thought that "I Invented Sex" would be a "career-defining record, and I knew 'Say Aah' would be a monster club record."

Speaking on his collaborations with the producers, Songz said that on Ready, "we're breaking down every song, every hook, every chorus, every bridge, and we're making sure every song is the best song it could be. This album isn't just going to be a compilation of songs, but a classic body of work." The album only contained three guest features with Drake, Gucci Mane and Soulja Boy Tell 'Em. Songz wanted to keep the number of features very limited, and stated that "anybody else I add is going to be very special". American rapper Fabolous was added as a guest feature on the track, titled "Say Aah".

Songz said that compared to his previous albums, "this album is very adult, very easygoing and very sexy [...] My first album was very adult-like, but in a different, more soulful, sample-driven kind of way, and my second one was more contemporary and trendy." To reflect his transition into adulthood and the changes in his music, Songz changed his appearance by cutting off his trademark braids. Songz also began dressing in more sophisticated attire, trading in sneakers and T-shirts for vests, tailored pants, and "tasteful" shoes. On the appearance change, Songz's mentor, producer, and the head of Songbook Entertainment, Troy Taylor said, "Trey's from the streets, he's a hood kid. He wasn't glamorous and (didn't have) the finer things in life growing up, [...] He didn't want to lose his street-ism, [...] As he grew into it I think he began to realize, 'Wait a minute, this ain't that bad after all,' and then he got the ladies' opinions."

After Ready's success, Songz explained that the album was a result of his growth and new-found maturity. Commenting about the success of his singles, Songz stated that "they're very strong records and they're not just radio records. They're records that embody the person I am as well as the artist I am. I think they're more definitive of who I am than any other album I've had. I've grown as an artist. I've been doing this for awhile [sic] now. As I've matured, I've learned how to exude that of which I want to be felt. I've learned what my fans want from me and things of that nature."

== Composition ==
"Say Aah"
Songz's first top ten hit is electronica-driven hip-hop.

"Neighbors Know My Name"
The album's fifth single, which contains a "knocking bassline."

Ready is an R&B album that contains influences of hip-hop and pop, with a bit of soul, as much of the work has been compared to vintage R. Kelly. Concerning the album's lyrical content, Ken Capobianco of the Boston Globe said, "While many male modern R&B vocalists are moving to a more mature vibe, Trey Songz keeps the horndog-with-a-heart tradition alive with his third album." Sean Fennessey of The Village Voice said, that Ready, featured Songz's "re-imagining the notion of flow—if not melody—just as his hero Kelly did 15 years ago." Andrew Rennie of Now Magazine said the production had a 1980s soundtrack vibe. According to Mark Edward Nero of About.com, "I Need A Girl" contains familiar qualities of Songz's breakout hit "Can't Help but Wait", also produced by Stargate. The song is lyrically about finding and pleasing the right woman. The song has also been described to be a mix of Usher and Justin Timberlake

Melanie Bertoli of Billboard said that "Neighbors Know My Name" "employs a knocking bassline and drip-drop effect to provide the ideal erotic backdrop for Songz's dirty talk." "Black Roses" is "set to quasi-electronica production, buoyed by a soulful vocal arrangement." Tyler Lewis of PopMatters said "Be Where You Are" was reminiscent of Jordan Knight's "Give It to You", and called it Songz's purest pop song to date. "Yo Side of the Bed", containing soul influences, has been called R&B-pop rock similar to some of Beyoncé's work on I Am... Sasha Fierce and Brandy on Human. "LOL :-)" is lyrically about sexting, while featuring a "ringtone-ready" chorus, and heavy percussion.

== Promotion ==
Promoting the album, a major online campaign was launched, his blog site, SeeFurtherThanIAm.com, on which Songz streams live chats and behind-the-scenes videos. He also released a track on his Twitter every Monday, some of which was from his mixtape Anticipation, which preceded the album's release. Songz embarked on a promo tour on July 25, 2009, with stops in Chicago, Miami, Atlanta, Dallas and the Carolinas, where he attended radio events and listening sessions. He also toured the House of Blues in September, as well as a college tour that fall. In addition to co-headlining the 106 & Live! tour with Mario, also featuring Day26 and Sean Garrett, which toured from September 29, 2009 to October 31, 2009, Songz served as a supporting act in 2010 for Jay-Z's The Blueprint 3 Tour, along with Young Jeezy.

In addition to the online and touring promotion, Songz made an appearance with his mother and younger-half brother, Forrest, to perform at AMBER Ready Back-to-School Safety Weekend at ABC Studios in Times Square on August 16, 2009. He appeared on BET's 106 & Park on August 31, 2009, September 1, 2009 and September 2, 2009, performing a medley of "Successful", "I Need a Girl" and "LOL :-)" on the latter date. He performed "I Need a Girl" on September 9, 2009, on The Wendy Williams Show.

== Singles ==
The album's lead single, "I Need a Girl" was released via digital download on April 13, 2009, with "Brand New" as its B-side. "I Need a Girl" received positive to mixed reviews, with some critics comparing it to "Can't Help But Wait" and others noting it as generic. The song peaked at 59 on the US Billboard Hot 100 and number 6 on the Hot R&B/Hip-Hop Songs.

Songz appeared as a featured artist on Drake's single, "Successful"; the song peaked at number 17 on the Billboard Hot 100, and was a success on other charts, while reaching at numbers 3 and 2 on the US Top R&B/Hip-Hop and Top Rap Songs charts, respectively. Although it was not released as a dual single for Songz and Drake, Songz included this track for Ready, and then sans with the other featured guest by Lil Wayne, and the addition of another by himself.

"LOL :-)" featuring Gucci Mane and Soulja Boy Tell 'Em, was released to airplay as the album's second single on August 24, 2009. The song received generally positive reviews, while peaking at number 51 on the US Billboard Hot 100.

"I Invented Sex" featuring Drake, was released to airplay as the album's third single on October 13, 2009. The song reached at number 42 on the US Billboard Hot 100, and it became Songz's first number one hit on the Hot R&B/Hip-Hop Songs chart. The remix to "I Invented Sex" featuring fellow R&B singers Keri Hilson and Usher, was released.

The album's fourth single, "Say Aah" featuring Fabolous, was released on January 12, 2010. The song became the most successful song of Songz's career, by reaching at number 9 on the US Billboard Hot 100. Additionally it was his first song to impact pop radio, appearing on the Pop Songs chart, and his first to chart internationally, charting on the Canadian Hot 100.

"Neighbors Know My Name"; the album's fifth and final single was released on February 16, 2010, and it received generally positive reviews, while reaching at number 43 on the US Billboard Hot 100, and number 4 on the Hot R&B/Hip-Hop Songs, giving Songz his third consecutive top five single and fifth top ten single from Ready.

=== Other songs ===
Although it was not released as a single, the music video for "Yo Side of the Bed", in which Keri Hilson portrayed Songz's love interest, was filmed and released.

== Critical reception ==
Professional ratings
Review scores
Source	Rating
Allmusic	3.5/5 stars
MSN Music (Consumer Guide)	(dud)
The New York Times	favorable
Newsday	B−
Now	4/5 stars
PopMatters	5/10
Rolling Stone	3.5/5 stars
Tiny Mix Tapes	3/5 stars
USA Today	3/4 stars
The Village Voice	favorable

Ready received mostly positive reviews from professional critics, which received an aggregate score of 67 out of 100. The score, indicating "generally favorable reviews" was based on six reviews from website Metacritic. It received many comparisons to the work of R&B artist R. Kelly, while several critics noted it as inconsistent. David Jeffries of Allmusic said that "Even at a whopping 17 like-minded tracks, all-night lovers wouldn't be caught dead complaining about how overly long it all is", commenting that Ready "is as entertaining and frivolous as a one-night stand should be." Ken Capobianco of The Boston Globe said that Songz had developed as a vocalist stating his voice was more "elastic" and he used his falsetto "judiciously." Capobianco commended tracks like "Be Where You Are," and "Love Lost", commenting that "tracks like that show that he is indeed ready for the next step." Andrew Rennie of Now said, "slight deviations from R&B's classic formula allow Trey Songz wiggle room to play with his multi-octave voice. This offering sets him apart from other acts and may secure his spot in the canon of bedroom crooners." Glenn Gamboa of Newsday said that after making his name for singing hooks on rap songs, that he "shows his smooth R&B vocals can hold the spotlight all on their own." Rolling Stone gave the album 3½ out of 5 stars and wrote that Songz "takes cues from R. Kelly, slyly mocking the self-parodying excesses of boudoir R&B while supplying the utilitarian goods: the sumptuous vocal harmonies and sultry beats upon which long nights beneath ceiling mirrors depend". A writer for USA Today said the album reflects his broad appeal, and that Songz's proves "he's comfortable as a rogue or romantic. Even though the review pointed out that "he occasionally falls back on booty-call clichés," it did point out that "his song craft shines on the edgy "Black Roses" and regretful "Love Lost." Jon Caramanica of The New York Times said, " 'Ready' is one of the year's most promising R&B albums, and a curious one at that", commenting, "the results are bawdy but never lecherous; sometimes all his enthusiastic bedroom talk has an air of childlike goofiness to it, as if he were thrilled to get away with boasting so freely." Sean Fennesssy of The Village Voice called the album "one of the year's best..."

Despite viewing it imperfect and noting Songz had not mastered the balancing act "between being a horny boy and ladies' man", Mark Edward Nero of About.com said it was the best album of Songz's career, commenting, "Trey takes a big step toward establishing himself as an A-list singer." Nero also commended consistent vocals as a plus, and complimented the eclecticity of the songs, saying no tracks are unlistenable. Tyler Lewis of PopMatters said that Songz continued his tradition of inconsistent albums, commenting that the album is best is when it departs from the R. Kelly template. Lewis recommended that the album needed to be trimmed down and included with some from his mixtape Anticipation for what could have been, "the black pop record of the year." In his consumer guide for MSN Music, critic Robert Christgau gave to the album a dud rating, indicating "a bad record whose details rarely merit further thought. At the upper level it may merely be overrated, disappointing, or dull. Down below it may be contemptible". Ajitpaul Mangat of Tiny Mix Tapes called the album often "generic" and "monotonous" noting how Songz's work on freestyles and work ethic proves how the album could be better. Mangat did overall compliment the album, "While Ready is far from a perfect album, it seems Trey is learning how to inspirit his original works with the charm and inventiveness found in his freestyles and covers." The album earned Songz a Grammy Award nomination for Best Contemporary R&B Album in 2010.

== Commercial performance ==
Ready debuted at number three on the US Billboard 200 chart, with first-week sales of 131,000 copies in the United States. Ready was the second-highest debut of the week, only behind Whitney Houston's comeback album, I Look To You (2009). The album charted at number two on the Top R&B/Hip-Hop Albums charts. On February 16, 2010, the album was certified gold in sales, by the Recording Industry Association of America (RIAA), following shipments in excess of 500,000 copies in the United States. It is Songz's first RIAA-certified album. On June 11, 2014, the album was certified platinum.

== Track listing ==
No.	Title	Writer(s)	Producer(s)	Length
1.	"Panty Droppa (Intro)"	Tremaine Neverson; Troy Taylor; Patrick Hayes	Taylor; Hayes	1:27
2.	"Neighbors Know My Name"	Neverson; Taylor	Taylor; Hayes; McGee*	3:06
3.	"I Invented Sex" (featuring Drake)	Neverson; Carlos McKinney; Aubrey Graham	Los da Mystro	4:08
4.	"I Need a Girl"	Neverson; Mikkel Storleer Eriksen; Tor Erik Hermansen; Johntá Austin	StarGate; Austin	3:34
5.	"One Love"	Neverson; Bryan-Michael Cox; Austin	Cox; Austin	4:17
6.	"Does He Do It"	Neverson; Sean Garrett; Eric Hudson	Garrett; Hudson	3:01
7.	"Say Aah" (featuring Fabolous)	Neverson; Don Corell; Ronald "Young Yonny" Ferebee, Jr.; Taylor; John Jackson	Corell; Young Yonny; Taylor	3:27
8.	"LOL :-)" (featuring Gucci Mane and Soulja Boy Tell 'Em)	Neverson; Taylor; Radric Davis; DeAndre Way	Fisha & Pryce	4:08
9.	"Ready to Make Luv"	Neverson; Taylor	Taylor	1:21
10.	"Jupiter Love"	Neverson; Taylor	Taylor; McGee	4:34
11.	"Be Where You Are"	Neverson; Christopher "Deep" Henderson	Deep	4:00
12.	"Successful" (with Drake)	Neverson; Noah "40" Shebib; Graham	40	4:26
13.	"Black Roses"	Neverson; Brandon Green	Bei Maejor	3:34
14.	"Love Lost"	Neverson; Taylor	Neverson; Taylor	3:44
15.	"Hollalude"	Neverson; Taylor	Taylor	1:16
16.	"Holla If Ya Need Me"	Neverson; Taylor; Chris Hines	Taylor; Hines	4:05
17.	"Yo Side of the Bed"	Neverson; Taylor; Hayes	Taylor; Hayes	4:10

Deluxe edition (bonus tracks)
No.	Title	Writer(s)	Producer(s)	Length
18.	"Brand New"	Neverson; Kenneth Coby	Soundz	3:42
19.	"Scratchin' Me Up"	Neverson; Taylor	Taylor	4:09
20.	"You Belong to Me"	Neverson; Murphy D.; Taylor	McGee; Taylor	3:54

- (*) designates a co-producer.

== Personnel ==
Credits for Ready adapted from Allmusic.

- Rebeca Alexis – stylist
- Johnta Austin – executive producer
- Greg Gigendad Burke – art direction, design
- Mike Caren – A&R
- Mark B. Christensen – mastering
- Don Corell – producer
- Dwayne Cotton – guitar
- Bryan-Michael Cox – producer, instrumentation
- Mikkel S. Eriksen – engineer, instrumentation
- Jaycen Joshua Fowler – mixing
- Wayne Washington – A&R
- Sean Garrett – producer
- Rob Gold – photo production
- Paul Gregory – liner notes
- Dionnee Harper – marketing
- Patrick Hayes – producer
- Christopher "Deep" Henderson – keyboards, background vocals, producer, drum programming
- T.E. Hermansen – engineer
- Chris Hines – producer
- Jean-Marie Horvat – mixing
- Josh Houghkirk – mixing assistant
- Eric Hudson – producer
- Patrick Collier – engineer
- Espen Lind – guitar
- Giancarlo Lino – mixing assistant
- Craig Love – guitar
- Bei Maejor – producer
- Jack Manning – background vocals
- John McGee – producer
- Carlos "Los Da Mystro" McKinney– arranger, conductor, producer
- Delant "Butta" Murphy – executive producer, management
- Scott Naughton – engineer
- Tremaine Neverson – lead vocals, producer, executive producer
- Dave Pensado – mixing
- Tony "Chef Tone" Scales – producer
- Paul Gregory Senior – liner notes
- Noah "40 Shebib – producer, engineer, mixing
- Phil Tan – mixing
- Troy Taylor – producer, engineer, executive producer
- Sam Thomas – engineer
- Carolyn Tracey – package production
- Miles Walker – engineer
- Ben Watts – photography
- DeAndre Way – featured vocals
- Isaac West – bass
- Amir Windom – A&R

== Charts ==
=== Weekly charts ===
Chart (2009)	Peak position
US Billboard 200	3
US Top R&B/Hip-Hop Albums (Billboard)	2

=== Year-end charts ===
Chart (2009)	Position
US Billboard 200	100
US Top R&B/Hip-Hop Albums (Billboard)	25

Chart (2010)	Position
US Billboard 200	51
US Top R&B/Hip-Hop Albums (Billboard)	16

== Certifications ==
Region	Certification	Certified units/sales
United States (RIAA)	Platinum	1,000,000^{^}
^{^} Shipments figures based on certification alone.
