= Successful (song) =

Single by Drake featuring Trey Songz and Lil Wayne

from the album So Far Gone and Ready
- Released: February 13, 2009
- Recorded: 2008; PMCK Studios (Toronto, Ontario)
- Genre: Hip-hop; alternative R&B
- Length: 6:16 (mixtape version); 5:51 (EP version); 4:27 (album version without Lil Wayne); 3:25 (radio edit)
- Label: Young Money; Cash Money; Motown
- Songwriters: Aubrey Graham; Tremaine Neverson; Noah "40" Shebib; Dwayne Carter^{[A]}
- Producer: Noah "40" Shebib

Drake singles chronology
"Best I Ever Had" (2009)	"Successful" (2009)	"Every Girl" (2009)

Trey Songz singles chronology
"I Need a Girl" (2009)	"Successful" (2009)	"LOL :-)" (2009)

Lil Wayne singles chronology
"So Good" (2009)	"Successful" (2009)	"Always Strapped" (2009)

"Successful" is a song by Canadian rapper Drake and American singer Trey Songz featuring a guest appearance from Drake's mentor/labelmate American rapper Lil Wayne. The song was written by the trio and producer Noah "40" Shebib. The song served as the second single from Drake's mixtape, So Far Gone, and was included on Trey Songz's third studio album, Ready, sans Wayne and the addition of a new verse by Songz. Accompanied by a dark tone, the song's lyrics contain quips of self-determination.

"Successful" received critical acclaim from critics, some of which referred to the song as a standout track on Ready. While reaching seventeen on the Billboard Hot 100, the song peaked at two and three, respectively, on the Rap Songs and Hot R&B/Hip-Hop Songs charts. The accompanying music video features Drake and Songz venturing off into Toronto nightlife, interspersed with contemplative scenes. The song received several accolades, including being ranked seventeen on Rolling Stone's "25 Best Songs of 2009" list, and ranking ten on Spin's "The 20 Best Songs of 2009" roll. Complex named it the 82nd best song of the decade. Two years after its initial release, the track was certified gold by the Recording Industry Association of America (RIAA) for sales exceeding 500,000 copies in the United States alone and would later be certified platinum in June 2018.

== Background ==
The song was first released as Drake's follow-up track to "Best I Ever Had" for his So Far Gone mixtape, with Trey Songz and Lil Wayne received featuring credits. After the success of the two singles, Drake decided to release a retail version of the mixtape in the form of an extended play, including the song. On Songz's third album, Ready, he included the track, however Drake's verse was moved to the middle and Lil Wayne's rap was taken out in order to include a new verse by Songz.

The song was originally set to be on Drake's debut album, Thank Me Later, but after Drake forwent the song, he insisted that Songz include it on Ready. Songz stated in an interview what fan reception to the track mostly had been that he should put a verse in on "Successful", but Songz told BallerStatus,

"I was like, 'That's my homie's song.' Then initially, Drake came up to me with the idea like 'Nah dog. That's your song. I'm not putting it on my album. So it's going to be a waste. So it's going to be a big record with no one to go retrieve it.' So we put the verse on there just to give me a little more presence on the record for it to be on my album."

In an interview with MTV News, Drake explained how the song came about, stating, "It has this pocket, and there was no melody yet. I remember [producer Noah '40' Shebib] kind of making the joint, and then he hit this sound, which is the chords that are in there. It was so eerie. Like it was haunting, almost. I was like, 'Yo, that's it. You need to use that.' He started playing this patch, and just every note that he played fell into place. I had this beat sitting here that I love so much, and I didn't know what to do with it..."

== Writing ==
On writing the song, Drake contacted Songz, who had been working with Drake since 2007 on mixtapes. Songz said that Drake originally called him on advice of segueing his singing into rapping on interludes, then the terms of what records he would be featured on the mixtape, as he sent him the "Successful" track. After Drake still could not settle on the direction for the track, Songz came up with his hook. He explained to MTV News, "The first thing that came to mind was 'I want the money, money and the cars/ Cars and the clothes/ The ho's/ I suppose I just wanna be, I just wanna be successful.' When I'm saying all that, conceptually for me, the deepest part of the record was when I say, 'I suppose.' I supposed that's what success is about. That's what [we're] led to believe." After hearing the hook, Drake called it "powerful", commenting,

"And it's like, it's almost like it made me feel like it may not be right what I want, you know? All these things, it's like it made me feel young. It kind of made me feel ignorant to the game. But it was an exciting record even though the tempo is slow. That's what I want ... The 'I suppose' moment in there is like, it's almost like you're doubting yourself for a second. But at the end of the day, I just want to be successful. So that's what the record meant to me."

== Composition ==
"Successful"
A sample of "Successful" described as including a "reverb-driven harmony."

Drake has described the song as "eerie" and "dark", and as "simplistic" having a "reverb-driven harmony." Shaheem Reid of MTV News said this about the song: "Trey Songz's hook expresses the dreams of a young black male coming from nothing to something, and Drake's raps put the hip-hop nation on notice, while conveying his own desperation and hope and revealing family struggles. Let's not forget Lil Wayne's magnificent at bat as cleanup hitter..." An "endearing and revealing" moment happens in the record when Drake refers to an incident when his mother contemplated leaving home during family troubles.

== Music video ==
Songz and Drake standing on a balcony in the video, with usage of the Toronto skyline as a backdrop.

The music video for the Ready version of the song, filmed in Drake's hometown of Toronto, Ontario, was directed by Jake White. An on set video and stills were released on August 12, 2009, followed by a preview of the clip on August 27, 2009. The full video was released on August 31, 2009. The video was nominated for MuchVIBE Hiphop Video of the Year and Cinematographer of the Year the 2010 MuchMusic Video Awards, winning both awards. It ranked at number eight on BET: Notarized Top 100 Videos of 2009 countdown.

While accompanying Songz on 106 & Park when promoting, Ready, Drake explained the video, stating:

"The concept of the video is the fact that 'successful,' it applies to so many people that me and Trey just want to get the point across that we see ourselves and we see success in other individuals so really, it's a video about potential. It's a video about understanding that no matter what you do, there's a way to be successful doing it. It's one of those motivational videos. It actually ends with a quote from Barack Obama which is one of my favorite quotes I've ever read, so we decided to put it in the video. It's vivid."

The video begins with Drake going up an elevator while Songz sings shirtless on the edge of a bed with a woman laying naked on the other side looking on. Drake then ends up on a balcony singing in front of the Toronto skyline. Both are shown in scenes contemplating intermixed with Songz joining Drake on the balcony. Subsequently, scenes are shown of Drake and Songz riding through Toronto nightlife, along with the contemplative scenes, such as a young boy playing basketball in which Songz has an illusion that it is him, and little girl blowing a dandelion. The video ends with the skyline and a quote stating,

"Making your mark on the world is hard. If it were easy, everybody would do it. But it's not. It takes patience, it takes commitment, and it comes with plenty of failure along the way. The real test is not whether you avoid this failure, because you won't. It's whether you let it harden or shame you into inaction, or whether you learn from it; whether you choose to persevere."
- Barack Obama

== Live performances ==
Songz and Drake performed the song on 106 & Park on September 2, 2009, as a part of a medley of "I Need a Girl" and "LOL Smiley Face."

== Remixes ==
The song was remixed and renamed "Stressful" by Joell Ortiz & Novel for their critically acclaimed mixtape Defying the Predictable.

T-Pain made a remix called "More Careful" as an apology to Jay-Z.

In January 2010, nearly a year after the release of the song, an alternate version of Drake's 3rd verse leaked online. This version featured completely different lyrics from the final version.

== Critical reception ==
David Jeffries of Allmusic noted the song as a standout track from Ready. Andrew Rennie of Now Magazine called a "cautionary anthem" and the song the top track on the album. Rennie also said that "Successful" and "Black Roses", showcase Songz's developed, more mature side. Sean Fennessey of The Village Voice said, "The calm, yearning song is a bona fide hit, and also the best example of where r&b lives today." DJBooth said that there was "no reason to doubt that this track will become a mainstream smash." Shaheem Reid of MTV News said, "It's not a record that will kill the clubs, but when you just want to listen to superb lyricism and enthralling harmony, it's a must have." Rolling Stone ranked the song seventeen on their list of "Best 25 Songs of 2009" list, and Spin ranked it the tenth best song of 2009 on their "The 20 Best Songs of 2009" list.

== Chart performance ==
On the week labeled August 1, 2009, the song debuted on the Billboard Hot 100 at number eighty-eight. Weeks later, the song peaked at number seventeen, where it spent one week. The song spent eighteen weeks on the chart dropping off on the week ending November 28, 2009. Additionally the song reached three on the Hot R&B/Hip-Hop Songs chart and two on the Rap Songs chart.

== Track listing ==
- 7:27 (alternate mixtape version)
- 6:15 (mixtape version)
- 5:51 (EP version)
- 4:26 (Ready/video version)
- 3:25 (Radio edit)
- 2:02 (good version)

== Credits and personnel ==
- Songwriting – Noah "40" Shebib, Tremaine Neverson, Aubrey Graham, Dwayne Carter^{[A]}
- Production, recording and mixing – Noah "40" Shebib

* A Exclusively for the original single and So Far Gone mixtape and extended play versions.

== Charts ==
=== Weekly charts ===
Chart (2009)	Peak position
US Billboard Hot 100	17
US Hot R&B/Hip-Hop Songs (Billboard)	3
US Hot Rap Songs (Billboard)	2
US Rhythmic Airplay (Billboard)	10

=== Year-end charts ===
Chart (2009)	Position
US Hot R&B/Hip-Hop Songs (Billboard)	18

== Certifications ==
Region	Certification	Certified units/sales
United States (RIAA)	Platinum	1,000,000^{‡}
^{‡} Sales+streaming figures based on certification alone.
