= Jay-Z Fall Tour =

2009–10 concert tour by Jay-Z

- Continental tour by Jay-Z
- Location: North America
- Associated album: The Blueprint 3
- Start date: September 9, 2009
- End date: March 26, 2010
- Legs: 2
- No. of shows: 44

Jay-Z concert chronology
- Jay-Z & Ciara Live (2009); Jay-Z Fall Tour (2009–10); The Home & Home Tour (2010)

The Jay-Z Fall Tour, also known as The Blueprint 3 Tour, was a concert tour by American rapper Jay-Z in support of his eleventh studio album The Blueprint 3. The routing took the rap mogul to 18 cities in the U.S. and 7 in Canada, kicking off with a 9/11 benefit concert on September 9 in New York City and ending in Austin, Texas on November 22. It was announced in November 2009 that dates would be added for 2010, with Trey Songz and Young Jeezy joining Jay-Z as opening acts.

== Opening acts ==
- J. Cole
- Wale
- N.E.R.D.
- Trey Songz (2010 leg)
- Young Jeezy (2010 leg)

== Personnel ==
The Roc Boys

- Omar Edwards – musical director, keyboards
- Monty – keyboards
- Tony Russell – bass
- Shaun Carrington – guitar
- Natural – guitar (select dates only)
- Tony Royster Jr. – drums (solo on "Show Me What You Got")
- Brett Baker – percussion
- DJ Guru – DJ
- DJ Neil Armstrong – DJ (select dates only)
- Lamont Caldwell – saxophone
- Lee Hogans – trumpet
- Aaron Goode – trombone

== Set list ==
1. "Run This Town"
2. "D.O.A. (Death of Autotune)"
3. "U Don't Know"
4. "Show Me What You Got"
5. "I Just Wanna Love U (Give It 2 Me)"
6. "Jigga What, Jigga Who"
7. "Izzo (H.O.V.A.)"
8. "P.S.A. (Public Service Announcement)"
9. "Heart of The City (Ain't No Love)"
10. "Already Home" (with Trey Songz)
11. "Empire State of Mind" (with Bridget Kelly)
12. "So Ambitious" (with Pharrell)
13. "Dirt off Your Shoulder"
14. "A Star Is Born" (with J. Cole)
15. "Thank You"
16. "On to the Next One"
17. "Venus vs. Mars"
18. "Swagga Like Us"
19. "Can I Get A..."
20. "Big Pimpin'"
21. "Hard Knock Life (Ghetto Anthem)"
22. "Encore"
23. "Young Forever"

== Tour dates ==
Date	City	Country	Venue
North America
September 9, 2009	New York City	United States	Madison Square Garden
October 1, 2009	University Park	United States	Bryce Jordan Center
October 10, 2009	Highland Heights	United States	The Bank of Kentucky Center
October 13, 2009	Edmonton	Canada	Rexall Place
October 14, 2009	Calgary	Canada	Pengrowth Saddledome
October 15, 2009	Kelowna	Canada	Prospera Place
October 16, 2009	Vancouver	Canada	General Motors Place
October 17, 2009	Seattle	United States	KeyArena
October 21, 2009	Ypsilanti	United States	Eastern Michigan University
October 22, 2009	Cleveland	United States	Wolstein Center
October 23, 2009	Philadelphia	United States	Wachovia Center
October 24, 2009	Providence	United States	Dunkin' Donuts Center
October 25, 2009	Amherst	United States	Mullins Center
October 27, 2009	Baltimore	United States	1st Mariner Arena
October 28, 2009	Columbus	United States	Schottenstein Center
October 29, 2009	London	Canada	John Labatt Centre
October 30, 2009	Montreal	Canada	Bell Centre
October 31, 2009	Toronto	Canada	Air Canada Centre
November 1, 2009	Ottawa	Canada	Scotiabank Place
November 7, 2009	Fresno	United States	Save Mart Center
November 8, 2009	Los Angeles	United States	Pauley Pavilion
November 10, 2009	Austin	United States	Frank Erwin Center
November 12, 2009	Champaign	United States	Assembly Hall
February 20, 2010	Sunrise	United States	BankAtlantic Center
February 22, 2010	Houston	United States	Toyota Center
February 23, 2010	Dallas	United States	American Airlines Center
February 25, 2010	New Orleans	United States	New Orleans Arena
February 27, 2010	Atlanta	United States	Philips Arena
February 28, 2010	Greensboro	United States	Greensboro Coliseum Complex
March 2, 2010	New York City	United States	Madison Square Garden
March 3, 2010	Washington, D.C.	United States	Verizon Center
March 5, 2010	Uncasville	United States	Mohegan Sun
March 6, 2010	East Rutherford	United States	Izod Center
March 7, 2010	Norfolk	United States	Norfolk Scope
March 11, 2010	Boston	United States	TD Garden
March 12, 2010	Uniondale	United States	Nassau Veterans Memorial Coliseum
March 14, 2010	Auburn Hills	United States	The Palace of Auburn Hills
March 16, 2010	Pittsburgh	United States	Mellon Arena
March 18, 2010	Chicago	United States	United Center
March 19, 2010	St. Louis	United States	Scottrade Center
March 20, 2010	Indianapolis	United States	Conseco Fieldhouse
March 22, 2010	Denver	United States	Pepsi Center
March 24, 2010	San Jose	United States	HP Pavilion
March 26, 2010	Los Angeles	United States	Staples Center

Cancelled dates

The following dates have been canceled by tour promoter Live Nation, due to "an unforeseen scheduling conflict."

- November 17, Lubbock
- November 19, Albuquerque
- November 20, El Paso
