= Best I Ever Had =

2009 single by Drake

Single by Drake

from the EP So Far Gone and the album Thank Me Later
- A-side: "Fancy (double A-Side)"
- Released: February 13, 2009 (download); June 16, 2009 (single); November 29, 2010 (UK)
- Recorded: 2008
- Genre: Hip-hop
- Length: 4:19
- Label: Aspire; Young Money; Cash Money; Universal Motown
- Songwriters: Aubrey Graham; Dan Hamilton; Dwayne Carter; Matthew Samuels; Nakia Coleman
- Producer: Boi-1da

Drake singles chronology
"Replacement Girl" (2007)	"Best I Ever Had" (2009)	"Successful" (2009)

"Best I Ever Had" is a song by the Canadian rapper Drake from his third mixtape So Far Gone. The song was later re-released on his debut EP of the same name. The song's popularity helped Drake decide to release So Far Gone as an EP, available for purchase. "Best I Ever Had" is also included as a bonus track on Drake's debut studio album Thank Me Later in certain countries. The song samples "Fallin' in Love" by Hamilton, Joe Frank & Reynolds and "Do It for the Boy" by Lil Wayne, and was produced by Boi-1da.

It was released as the first single from the tape as a digital download on February 11, 2009, and later as the third single from the EP in the United Kingdom on October 11, 2010, as a double-A-side single with "Fancy", which would later appear in Thank Me Later. The single peaked at number two on the US Billboard Hot 100, becoming Drake's first top-ten single. It remained his highest-charting single as a lead artist (as both Rihanna collaborations "What's My Name?" and "Work" reached number one) in the United States until "One Dance" (2016) peaked at number one.

The song was nominated twice at the 52nd Annual Grammy Awards: Best Rap Solo Performance and Best Rap Song, although it lost both awards. In early 2010, the song was nominated for Single of the Year at the 2010 Juno Awards, but it lost to Michael Bublé's "Haven't Met You Yet".

== Background and composition ==
Drake began work on "Best I Ever Had" along with the rest of his mixtape So Far Gone on the directive of the management team of his mentor Lil Wayne, who he was touring with at the time. In a 2013 interview with FLOW 93.5, Drake said the song was written about Zineb "Nebby" Samir, an ex-girlfriend of his who "represented everything about the city that I loved."

Producer Boi-1da said he made the beat for the song between December 2008 and January 2009 while living with his parents. Drake had asked him for two more tracks to complete his then-upcoming mixtape. A friend sent him a folder of "old school samples and what not" in which he found "Fallin' in Love", a song released in 1975 by American rock band Hamilton, Joe Frank & Reynolds. He liked the intro to the song, a bass riff which he described as "very smooth" and "a quicker tempo than a lot of the stuff I do", and sampled it to create the entire beat for "Best I Ever Had" within 20 minutes. Despite thinking it was "simple" and "kinda just a skeleton", he sent it to Drake the next day, who recorded the vocals and finished it within hours.

"Best I Ever Had" is 4 minutes and 16 seconds long and has a tempo of 107 beats per minute. Writing credits are attributed to Drake and Boi-1da, while the latter is credited with producing the song and 40 (Noah Shebib) is credited with mixing and recording. It is a slow jam with rap-sung vocals and a "brassy syncopated beat". Boi-1da called the production "emotional" and recalled envisioning it during its creation as "a song about a girl". It has been described as a "Nerf-heavy declaration of lust" in which Drake both sings and raps to an unnamed lover in a second-person perspective, serenading them with "raunchy bons mots". Drake delivers lines of braggadocio ("Buzz so big I could probably sell a blank disc") as well as tenderness complimenting his lover ("Sweat pants, hair tied, chilling with no makeup on/That's when you the prettiest, I hope you don't take it wrong") including the chorus.

== Release and artwork ==
"Best I Ever Had" was released on February 13, 2009, as the tenth track on So Far Gone and its lead single. Drake said in a 2019 interview that he originally planned for the track "Uptown" featuring Bun B and Lil Wayne to be So Far Gone's first single, but was convinced by LeBron James' agent Rich Paul to release "Best I Ever Had" instead. The artwork for "Best I Ever Had" originally showed the single as a file on a computer with a plain white background, designed by artwork designer Darkie; this was deemed as too generic by iTunes; a new cover was created by Darkie.

== Controversy ==
After the 2009 BMI Awards on September 10, 2009, reports surfaced that Memphis rapper and producer Kia Shine had won three awards based off a writing credit for "Best I Ever Had" which had sampled various elements of "Do It For The Boy", a song he did for Lil Wayne which was on the October 2008 mixtape The Leak. Kia Shine said he produced the beat and wrote the hook for the song and shared it with Lil Wayne in March 2008, which eventually found its way to Drake. He was shopping the beat to another artist when DJ Absolut called him to ask why he sold it to Drake, whereupon he denied doing so. As the original record was already registered, Kia Shine's legal team contacted Universal Music Group and settled on a 25% royalty credit for "Best I Ever Had".

Drake responded in blog post on September 17: "I have never met Kia Shine or worked with him. I wrote the entire composition in Toronto and I borrowed one line from a Lil Wayne song that he produced the BEAT for. The claims of 25% ownership are false and for a artist to brag about splits on a song is distasteful to begin with." Kia Shine later posted an image on Twitter showcasing the three plaques awarded to him at the BMI Awards. He told Angela Yee that he rejected the claims of bragging, stating he was "just giving the information about what happened". He recalled in a 2024 interview that he spoke to Drake in person afterwards and settled the dispute.

In a lawsuit filed on June 24, 2010, Drake was sued for copyright infringement by Playboy Enterprises for the sampling of "Fallin' in Love", a song to which Playboy owns the copyright to, in "Best I Ever Had". The suit named Drake, as well as Cash Money Records and Universal Music Group, and asserted that Playboy "has suffered, and will continue to suffer irreparable injury" from the alleged infringement. The lawsuit demanded that "all infringing works be recalled and destroyed". As part of its claim, Playboy also alleged that "each defendant either knew, or should have reasonably known, that the sound recording was protected by copyright". By 2012, the lawsuit had been settled for an undisclosed amount.

== Music video ==
Drake told MTV News before his show at Manhattan's SOB's that he was in the process of putting together a music video for the song. He explained: "I been working with people on some ideas," he explained. "I don't wanna say who yet, because everything isn't confirmed yet. It should be pretty solid in the next few days. The biggest thing about that song is that a lot of women come up to me and say, 'That's my song, because it really makes me feel special.' So I told the directors that were interested that I just want the visuals to coincide with that feeling. I want women to feel special when they watch the visual and say, 'I wish that was me,' or 'I know that feeling.' That's the goal with the video — to be genuine and not sappy. Be sexy and keep it together, but still make women smile."

The video, directed by Kanye West, was shot in Brooklyn, New York at Bishop Ford Central Catholic High School. Trey Songz, Fabolous, Consequence, and the song's producer Boi-1da made cameos in the video, as well as artists signed to Young Money Entertainment, such as Lil Twist, Shanell, and Lil Chuckee.

A clip of the video was shown June 30, 2009, on It's On with Alexa Chung, and the full version of the video premiered on the internet on July 1, 2009. The full version of the video made its television debut on AMTV on July 2, 2009. There was criticism of the video in the media, including an article in the British newspaper The Guardian, highlighting the gratuitous focus on the unsupported implanted breasts and prominent posteriors of the female basketball players that Drake coaches in the video.

=== Synopsis ===
A women's basketball team prepares for a game, primarily by stretching. Their coach, Drake, references a clipboard of basketball diagrams in the stairwell. Coach Drake hands out jerseys in his office. In a locker room, he gives an encouraging speech to the team before a championship game. He assures the members of the team that they are all the best. Their opponents, in green jerseys, come out onto the court and are revealed to be much taller and fitter than Drake's team. They are much more successful at scoring points than Drake's team. Drake complains to the referee, who rolls his eyes. Drake calls a timeout and delivers a rousing pep talk, replete with sexual innuendo, to his team. They protest that all he taught them how to do was stretch.

The game resumes and the opposing team continues to prevail, winning with a score of 91 to 14. Drake's team is increasingly distraught. In the closing shots, Drake sits in his office alone, dejected.

== Remix ==
"Best I Ever Had Remix"

Song by Nicki Minaj featuring Drake

from the album Beam Me Up Scotty
- Released: April 18, 2009; May 14, 2021; (reissue)
- Genre: Hip-hop
- Length: 5:26
- Label: Young Money; Aphilliates; Republic Records
- Songwriters: Onika Maraj; Aubrey Graham; Danny Hamilton; Dwayne Carter; Matthew Samuels; Nakia Coleman
- Producers: Boi-1da; DJ Holiday; The Trap-a-Holics

The official remix of the song features American rapper and singer Nicki Minaj, who was labelmates with Drake on Lil Wayne's Young Money Entertainment at the time, appearing on two of the label's compilation albums together (We Are Young Money in 2009 and Young Money: Rise of an Empire in 2014), although their contracts for the label would be fully expired by 2018.

The remix is included on Minaj's third mixtape, Beam Me Up Scotty, which was released on 18 April 2009. The song appears as the 11th track on the album, and, when the mixtape was reissued on 14 May 2021, the song appeared as the fifteenth track, called "Best I Ever Had Remix". The remix is credited as featuring Drake, as it retains some of his vocals from the original version.

Other artists to add an additional verse after Drake's first hook on the track include fellow singers and rappers Tank, Mase, Busta Rhymes, Swizz Beatz, R. Kelly and Wiz Khalifa, Rick Ross, Ace Hood, and Trey Songz, the latter of whom appeared in the official music video for the track and officially collaborated on a composition with Drake, specifically on the second and final single for So Far Gone, "Successful", which also appears on Trey's third studio album, Ready and features Lil Wayne.

== Chart performance ==
The song debuted at number 92 on the Billboard Hot 100 in the US and went on to peak at number two for four weeks behind The Black Eyed Peas' "I Gotta Feeling" before falling to number three, making Drake the third Canadian rapper to have a song chart on the Hot 100 (the first being Kardinal Offishall with "Dangerous" at number five, followed by K'naan with "Wavin' Flag" at number 99). The single rose to number one on the Hot R&B/Hip-Hop Songs due to high airplay and downloads. It debuted on Hot Rap Tracks on May 9 at number 24 and peaked at number one. Drake became the first Canadian rapper to achieve a number-one song on the Hot R&B/Hip-Hop Songs and Hot Rap Tracks charts, simultaneously. He is the second Canadian artist to reach the summit of the Hot R&B/Hip-Hop Songs after Deborah Cox's "Nobody's Supposed to Be Here". Within the first two weeks of its availability for sale on iTunes, "Best I Ever Had" garnered over 300,000 units sold. According to the June 29 edition of The New York Times, these sales earned Drake the number four best selling single, behind only songs from The Black Eyed Peas and Sean Kingston. The single peaked at number 49 on the Pop 100 chart before the chart was discontinued. By December 2010, "Best I Ever Had" had been downloaded over 2,000,000 times since its release.

On May 28, 2009, an unauthorized album The Girls Love Drake, released by a label named Canadian Money Entertainment was released to iTunes, which featured the song as well as the Young Money Entertainment song "Every Girl". Both songs jumped on the Billboard Hot 100 due to heavy downloads of the album, at the positions of number 18 and number 35 respectively. After a couple of days it was removed at the request of Drake's management, with Drake filing a lawsuit against the label.

== Charts ==
=== Weekly charts ===
Weekly chart performance for "Best I Ever Had"
Chart (2009)	Peak position
Canada Hot 100 (Billboard)	24
Global 200 (Billboard)	180
Netherlands (Dutch Tipparade 40)	5
Netherlands (TMF Superchart)	13
UK Independent (Official Charts)	34
US Billboard Hot 100	2
US Hot R&B/Hip-Hop Songs (Billboard)	1
US Hot Rap Songs (Billboard)	1
US Pop Airplay (Billboard)	10
US Rhythmic Airplay (Billboard)	1

Chart (2013)	Peak position
UK Hip Hop/R&B (Official Charts)	28

=== Year-end charts ===
Year-end chart performance for "Best I Ever Had"
Chart (2009)	Position
Canada (Canadian Hot 100)	79
US Billboard Hot 100	22
US Hot R&B/Hip-Hop Songs (Billboard)	4
US Hot Rap Songs (Billboard)	1
US Rhythmic (Billboard)	1

== Certifications ==
Certifications and sales for "Best I Ever Had"
Region	Certification	Certified units/sales
Australia (ARIA)	2× Platinum	140,000^{‡}
United Kingdom (BPI)	Platinum	600,000^{‡}
United States (RIAA)	Diamond	10,000,000^{‡}
United States (RIAA) Mastertone	Platinum	1,000,000^{*}
^{*} Sales figures based on certification alone.^{‡} Sales+streaming figures based on certification alone.

== See also ==
- List of R&B number-one singles of 2009 (U.S.)
