= I'm Goin' In =

Single by Drake featuring Lil Wayne and Young Jeezy

from the EP So Far Gone
- Released: October 27, 2009
- Recorded: 2008
- Genre: Hip hop
- Length: 3:45
- Label: Young Money; Cash Money; Motown
- Songwriters: Aubrey Graham; Dwayne Carter; Jay Jenkins; Khari Cain
- Producer: Needlz

Drake singles chronology
"Forever" (2009)	"I'm Goin' In" (2009)	"Fed Up" (2009)

Lil Wayne singles chronology
"Give It Up to Me" (2009)	"I'm Goin' In" (2009)	"On Fire" (2009)

Young Jeezy singles chronology
"Better Believe It" (2009)	"I'm Goin' In" (2009)	"Fed Up" (2009)

"I'm Goin' In" is a song by Canadian rapper Drake. The song features the American rappers Lil Wayne and Young Jeezy, and appears on Drake's EP So Far Gone (2009). The song was written by these three along with Khari "Needlz" Cain, who produced the song. "I'm Goin' In" was sent to urban contemporary radio as the EP's third and final single on October 27, 2009.

== Release ==
Prior to the official release, a version without Young Jeezy was leaked online. A solo version with just Lil Wayne was also leaked online. "I'm Goin' In" was sent to urban contemporary radio in the United States on October 27, 2009.

== Chart performance ==
The song peaked at number 40 on the US Billboard Hot 100. It also peaked at numbers 28 and 11 respectively on the Billboard Hot R&B/Hip-Hop Songs and Rap Songs charts. The song was later certified platinum by the Recording Industry Association of America (RIAA) for sales of over a million copies.

== Charts ==
Chart (2009)	Peak position
US Billboard Hot 100	40
US Hot R&B/Hip-Hop Songs (Billboard)	28
US Rap Songs (Billboard)	11

== Certifications ==
Region	Certification	Certified units/sales
United States (RIAA)	Platinum	1,000,000^{^}
^{^} Shipments figures based on certification alone.
