= It's On with Alexa Chung =

- Genre: Interactive web/music/talk/variety
- Presented by: Alexa Chung
- Country of origin: United States
- Original language: English
- No. of seasons: 2

Production
- Executive producer: Corin Nelson
- Production locations: New York, New York, USA
- Camera setup: Multi-camera live
- Running time: 60 minutes (season 1); 30 minutes (season 2)

Original release
- Network: MTV
- Release: June 15 – December 17, 2009

It's On with Alexa Chung is an American live interactive talk and variety program that aired weekdays on MTV from June 15 to December 17, 2009. The show was hosted by British model-turned-television personality Alexa Chung and focused on celebrity interviews, musical performances, and online content. Critical reception was largely negative.

== Synopsis ==
Intended as a "successor" to MTV's Total Request Live, the series was a mash-up of television and web content, featuring live music performances, celebrity interviews, videos, and content from social networking sites such as Facebook and Twitter. Wall Street Journal reporter Jamin Brophy-Warren wrote that the show targeted teenagers who had been "fleeing television for the Web."

The show used Twitter and Facebook in order to encourage audience interaction, executive producer Corin Nelson told The Wall Street Journal. Nelson's examples included using viewers' Facebook profiles as song lyrics and allowing viewers to ask questions to celebrities via Twitter.

== History ==
The debut episode premiered on MTV in the U.S., at 12 p.m. EST on June 15, 2009. The interview guests were actors Jack Black and Michael Cera to promote their movie Year One, and the musical guest was rapper Soulja Boy, performing his hit "Turn My Swag On". One segment of the episode featured user-generated content found on social media, such as a beatboxing video on YouTube and relationship statuses on Facebook. Heidi Montag and Spencer Pratt, stars of MTV's The Hills, also made an unannounced appearance.

MTV UK planned to start showing It's On on September 7, 2009 with a three-week delay; however, the show was removed from the schedule hours before its time slot due to what MTV UK called "unforeseen clearance issues" and the distributor not licensing the show outside the U.S.

With episodes reduced from one hour to 30 minutes, season two of It's On debuted October 19 in a later, 3:30 p.m. time slot. Guests on the season two debut week included actor Gerard Butler and rock band Paramore.

MTV canceled It's On in December 2009. In an April 2010 interview with Radio Times, Chung attributed the cancelation in part due to cultural differences between the US and UK regarding female TV presenters. In October 2010, Elizabeth Day wrote for The Observer that the end of It's On was "partly because the slick American television executives did not quite understand Chung's quirky British predilection for saying exactly what she thought and partly because her irreverent humour was lost in translation."

== Critical reception ==
In a preview of the show, New York Daily News reporter Cristina Kinon anticipated that Chung's "dry sense of humor and laid-back attitude can be expected to win American fans soon enough."

However, reviews after the first episode were unfavorable. For Vulture, Mark Graham called the first episode "bumpy", describing Chung's hosting style as "low-key, almost bordering on reserved" and questioning if the show's 12 p.m. time slot was a good fit for the high school and college aged target audience. Jean Bentley found the show's focus on social media as "trying desperately to be hip and now" and had a mixed review of Chung: "She seemed witty enough, throwing in one-liners between scripted banter, but her hosting style was too abrupt..."

Troy Patterson of Slate was more complimentary of Chung, contrasting her "goofy manner" and "posh accent" and suggesting she might become "the David Letterman of daytime talk-show hosts."
