= Trey Songz discography =

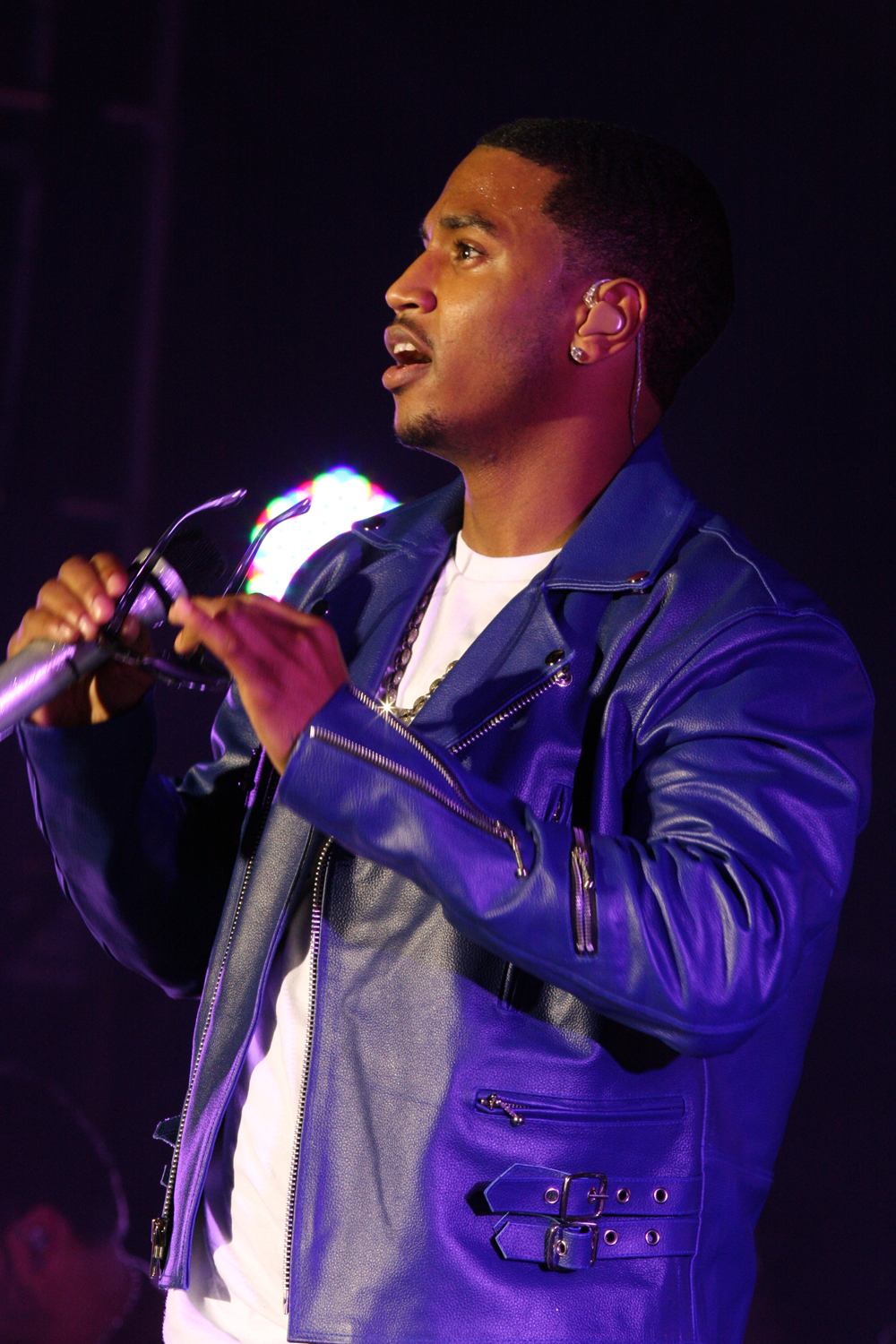
- Songz performing in 2012
- Studio albums: 8
- Extended plays: 2
- Singles: 59
- Music videos: 29
- Reissues: 1
- Mixtapes: 12
- Promotional singles: 7

American R&B singer Trey Songz has released eight studio albums, two extended plays (EPs), seven mixtapes and fifty-nine singles (including thirty as a featured artist). His music has sold an overall 32 million records worldwide in singles and albums.

== Albums ==
=== Studio albums ===
List of albums, with selected chart positions, sales figures and certifications
Title	Album details	Peak chart positions										Sales	Certifications
Title	Album details	US	US R&B/HH	AUS	BEL (FLA)	BEL (WAL)	CAN	FRA	NLD	NZ	UK	Sales	Certifications
I Gotta Make It	Released: July 26, 2005; Label: Atlantic; Formats: CD, digital download	20	6	—	—	—	—	—	—	—	—	US: 400,000	
Trey Day	Released: October 2, 2007; Label: Atlantic; Formats: CD, digital download	11	2	—	—	—	—	—	—	—	—	US: 500,000	RIAA: Gold
Ready	Released: August 31, 2009(8/25/09); Label: Songbook, Atlantic; Formats: CD, digital download	3	2	—	—	—	—	—	—	—	—	US: 1,000,000	RIAA: Platinum
Passion, Pain & Pleasure	Released: September 14, 2010; Label: Songbook, Atlantic; Formats: CD, digital download	2	1	—	—	—	—	138	58	—	167	US: 1,000,000	RIAA: Platinum
Chapter V	Released: August 21, 2012; Label: Songbook, Atlantic; Formats: CD, digital download	1	1	18	156	100	13	64	6	36	10	US: 500,000	RIAA: Gold
Trigga	Released: July 1, 2014; Label: Songbook, Atlantic; Formats: CD, digital download	1	1	21	93	106	20	46	23	—	17	US: 1,000,000	RIAA: Platinum; BPI: Silver; RMNZ: Platinum
Tremaine the Album	Released: March 24, 2017; Label: Songbook, Atlantic; Formats: CD, digital download	3	2	24	87	110	38	104	25	39	40	US: 500,000	RIAA: Gold
Back Home	Released: October 9, 2020; Label: Songbook, Atlantic; Formats: CD, digital download	15	9	—	—	—	—	—	—	—	—		
"—" denotes a title that did not chart, or was not released in that territory.													

=== Reissued albums ===
List of reissued albums
Title	Album details
Trigga Reloaded	Released: June 23, 2015 (US); Label: Songbook, Atlantic; Format: CD, digital download

=== EPs ===
List of extended plays, with selected chart positions
Title	Album details	Peak chart positions	
Title	Album details	US	US R&B
Inevitable	Released: November 28, 2011; Label: Songbook, Atlantic; Formats: CD, digital download	23	4
Intermission I & II	Released: May 18, 2015 (US); Label: Songbook, Atlantic; Formats: Digital download	52	6

=== Mixtapes ===
List of mixtapes with selected details
Title	Details	Peak chart positions
Title	Details	US
Da King and Da Prince (with Mumeet Daddy)	Released: 2004	—
In My Mind	Released: January 5, 2007	—
Genesis	Released: June 16, 2009 (Recorded 2003 pre-I Gotta Make It)	—
Anticipation	Released: June 30, 2009	—
#LemmeHolDatBeat	Released: November 28, 2010	—
Anticipation II	Released: November 1, 2011	—
#LemmeHolDatBeat2	Released: November 1, 2011	—
To Whom It May Concern (hosted by DJ Drama)	Released: November 28, 2015	—
Trappy New Years (with Fabolous)	Released: December 31, 2016	—
Anticipation III	Released: January 11, 2017	—
11	Released: November 28, 2018	82
28	Released: November 28, 2018	147

== Singles ==
=== As lead artist ===
List of singles as lead artist, with selected chart positions and certifications, showing year released and album name
Title	Year	Peak chart positions								Certifications	Album
Title	Year	US	US R&B	AUS	BEL (FL)	CAN	GER	IRE	UK	Certifications	Album
"Gotta Make It" (featuring Twista)	2005	87	21	—	—	—	—	—	—		I Gotta Make It
"Gotta Go"	2005	67	11	—	—	—	—	—	—		I Gotta Make It
"Wonder Woman"	2007	—	54	—	—	—	—	—	—		Trey Day
"Can't Help but Wait"	2007	14	2	—	—	—	—	—	115	RIAA: Gold; BPI: Silver; RMNZ: Gold	Trey Day
"Last Time"	2008	69	9	—	—	—	—	—	—		Trey Day
"I Need a Girl"	2009	59	6	—	—	—	—	—	—	RIAA: Gold; RMNZ: Gold	Ready
"LOL :-)" (featuring Gucci Mane and Soulja Boy)	2009	51	12	—	—	—	—	—	—		Ready
"I Invented Sex" (featuring Drake)	2009	42	1	—	—	—	—	—	—	RMNZ: Gold	Ready
"Say Aah" (featuring Fabolous)	2010	9	3	—	25	43	—	—	—	RIAA: 2× Platinum; MC: Gold; RMNZ: Gold	Ready
"Neighbors Know My Name"	2010	43	4	—	—	—	—	—	—	RIAA: Gold; RMNZ: Gold	Ready
"Already Taken"	2010	— (Note: "Already Taken" did not enter the US Billboard Hot 100, but peaked at number nine on the Bubbling Under Hot 100 Singles chart.)	39	—	—	—	—	—	79		Step Up 3D soundtrack
"Bottoms Up" (featuring Nicki Minaj)	2010	6	2	74	13	34	—	—	71	RIAA: 4× Platinum; BPI: Silver; RMNZ: Platinum	Passion, Pain & Pleasure
"Can't Be Friends"	2010	43	1	—	—	—	—	—	—	RIAA: Platinum	Passion, Pain & Pleasure
"Love Faces"	2011	63	3	—	—	—	—	—	—	RIAA: Platinum	Passion, Pain & Pleasure
"Unusual" (featuring Drake)	2011	68	7	—	—	—	—	—	—		Passion, Pain & Pleasure
"Sex Ain't Better Than Love"	2011	80	6	—	—	—	—	—	—		Inevitable
"Heart Attack"	2012	35	3	70	—	—	—	—	28	RIAA: Platinum	Chapter V
"2 Reasons" (featuring T.I.)	2012	43	7	—	—	—	—	—	—	RIAA: Platinum	Chapter V
"Simply Amazing"	2012	— (Note: "Simply Amazing" did not enter the US Billboard Hot 100, but peaked at number three on the Bubbling Under Hot 100 Singles chart.)	34	—	—	—	—	60	8	BPI: Silver	Chapter V
"Never Again"	2012	—	—	—	—	—	—	—	—		Chapter V
"Na Na"	2014	21	5	83	68	94	—	—	20	RIAA: 2× Platinum; BPI: Gold; RMNZ: Platinum	Trigga
"SmartPhones"	2014	— (Note: "SmartPhones" did not enter the US Billboard Hot 100, but peaked at number 15 on the Bubbling Under Hot 100 Singles chart.)	35	—	—	—	—	—	—		Trigga
"Foreign"	2014	84	25	—	69	—	—	—	—		Trigga
"Change Your Mind"	2014	—	—	—	—	—	-	—	—		Trigga
"What's Best For You"	2014	—	— (Note: "What's Best For You" did not enter the US Billboard Hot R&B/Hip-Hop Songs chart, but peaked at #21 on the Billboard R&B/Hip-Hop Airplay chart, #20 on the Billboard Hot R&B Songs chart, & #1 on the Billboard Adult R&B Songs chart.)	—	—	—	—	—	—		Trigga
"Touchin, Lovin" (featuring Nicki Minaj)	2014	43	12	88	—	—	—	—	79	RIAA: Platinum; BPI: Silver; RMNZ: Platinum	Trigga
"Slow Motion"	2015	26	9	—	—	—	—	100	—	RIAA: 3× Platinum; BPI: Gold; RMNZ: 2× Platinum	Trigga Reloaded
"About You"	2015	83	32	—	—	—	—	—	—	RMNZ: Gold	Trigga Reloaded
"Everybody Say" (featuring Dave East, MikexAngel, & DJ Drama)	2016	—	49	—	—	—	—	—	—		To Whom It May Concern
"Comin Home"	2016	—	—	—	—	—	—	—	—		Non-album single
"Nobody Else But You"	2017	92	35	—	—	—	—	—	—	RIAA: Platinum; RMNZ: Platinum	Tremaine the Album
"Playboy"	2017	— (Note: "Playboy" did not enter the US Billboard Hot 100, but peaked at number 16 on the Bubbling Under Hot 100 Singles chart.)	31	—	—	—	—	—	—		Tremaine the Album
"Animal"	2017	— (Note: "Animal" did not enter the US Billboard Hot 100, but peaked at number 1 on the Bubbling Under Hot 100 Singles chart.)	29	—	—	—	—	—	—		Tremaine the Album
"Song Goes Off"	2017	—	— (Note: "Song Goes Off" did not enter the US Billboard Hot R&B/Hip-Hop Songs chart, but peaked at #17 on the Billboard Hot R&B chart, #22 on the Billboard Hot R&B Songs chart.)	—	—	—	—	—	—		Tremaine the Album
"The Sheets... Still"	2017	—	—	—	—	—	—	—	—		Tremaine the Album
"How Dat Sound" (featuring 2 Chainz and Yo Gotti)	2018	—	—	—	—	—	—	—	—		28
"Shootin Shots" (featuring Ty Dolla Sign and Tory Lanez)	2018	—	—	—	—	—	—	—	—		11
"Chi Chi" (featuring Chris Brown)	2019	—	— (Note: "Chi Chi" did not enter the US Billboard Hot R&B/Hip-Hop Songs chart, but peaked at #17 on the Billboard Hot R&B chart.)	—	—	—	—	—	—	RMNZ: Gold	Non-album single
"Back Home" (featuring Summer Walker)	2020	—	— (Note: "Back Home" did not enter the US Billboard Hot R&B/Hip-Hop Songs chart, but peaked at #8 on the Billboard Hot R&B chart, #20 on the Billboard Hot R&B Songs chart.)	—	—	—	—	—	—		Back Home
"2020 Riots: How Many Times"	2020	—	—	—	—	—	—	—	—		Back Home
"Circles"	2020	—	— (Note: "Circles" did not enter the US Billboard Hot R&B/Hip-Hop Songs chart, but peaked at #17 on the Billboard Hot R&B chart, #20 on the Billboard Hot R&B Songs chart.)	—	—	—	—	—	—		Back Home
"Two Ways"	2020	—	—	—	—	—	—	—	—		Back Home
"On Call" (featuring Ty Dolla Sign)	2020	—	—	—	—	—	—	—	—		Back Home
"Brain"	2021	—	—	—	—	—	—	—	—		Non-album single
"Circles (Remix) (feat. B Money)"	2022	—	—	—	—	—	—	—	—		Non-album single
"Lonely"	2025	—	—	—	—	—	—	—	—		TBA
"Lost In Time"	2025	—	—	—	—	—	—	—	—		TBA
"Gimme a Chance"	2025	—	—	—	—	—	—	—	—		TBA
"Can't Stay Mad"	2025	—	—	—	—	—	—	—	—		TBA
"Say the Word"	2025	—	—	—	—	—	—	—	—		TBA
"History"	2025	—	—	—	—	—	—	—	—		TBA
"Lit Again" (with Feather featuring NIA and Ray J)	2025	—	—	—	—	—	—	—	—		TBA
"—" denotes releases that did not chart or receive certification.

=== As featured artist ===
List of singles as featured artist, with selected chart positions and certifications, showing year released and album name
Title	Year	Peak chart positions		Certifications	Album
Title	Year	US	US R&B	Certifications	Album
"Girl Tonite" (Twista featuring Trey Songz)	2005	14	3	RIAA: Gold	The Day After
"Summer wit Miami" (Jim Jones featuring Trey Songz)	2005	—	78		Harlem: Diary of a Summer
"1st Time" (Yung Joc featuring Marques Houston and Trey Songz)	2006	82	15	RIAA: Gold	New Joc City
"Missin' Ur Kisses" (Raptile featuring Trey Songz)	2006	—	—		Hero Muzik
"Replacement Girl" (Drake featuring Trey Songz)	2007	—	—		Comeback Season
"Girl You Know" (Remix) (Scarface featuring Trey Songz)	2008	—	58		Made
"Ride" (Ace Hood featuring Trey Songz)	2008	90	27		Gutta
"Da Baddest" (Big Kuntry King featuring Trey Songz)	2008	—	101^{[a]}		My Turn to Eat
"Without You" (Rebstar featuring Trey Songz)	2009	—	—		Arrival
"Successful" (Drake featuring Trey Songz)	2009	17	3	RIAA: Platinum	So Far Gone
"Yesterday" (Toni Braxton featuring Trey Songz)	2009	— (Note: "Yesterday" did not enter the US Billboard Hot 100, but peaked at number 16 on the Bubbling Under Hot 100 Singles chart.)	12		Pulse
"Pretty Brown" (Amerie featuring Trey Songz)	2009	—	78		In Love & War
"We Got Hood Love" (Mary J. Blige featuring Trey Songz)	2010	—	25		Stronger with Each Tear
"Sex Room" (Ludacris featuring Trey Songz)	2010	69	5		Battle of the Sexes
"If It Ain't About Money" (Fat Joe featuring Trey Songz)	2010	—	57		The Darkside Vol. 1
"Your Love" (Diddy – Dirty Money featuring Trey Songz)	2011	—	23		Last Train to Paris
"Out of My Head" (Lupe Fiasco featuring Trey Songz)	2011	40	11		Lasers
"Take Off" (Chipmunk featuring Trey Songz)	2011	—	—		Transition
"Can't Get Enough" (J. Cole featuring Trey Songz)	2011	52	7	RIAA: Platinum; BPI: Silver; RMNZ: 2× Platinum	Cole World: The Sideline Story
"I Don't Really Care" (Waka Flocka Flame featuring Trey Songz)	2012	64	25		Triple F Life: Friends, Fans and Family
"Put It on My Tab" (Sammie featuring Trey Songz)	2012	—	—		Non-album single
"Bounce It" (Juicy J featuring Wale and Trey Songz)	2013	74	25	RIAA: Gold	Stay Trippy
"Twilight Zone" (Sean Garrett featuring Trey Songz and Future)	2013	—	—		Non-album single
"Paranoid" (Remix) (Ty Dolla Sign featuring Trey Songz, French Montana and DJ Mustard)	2014	—	—		Beach House EP
"Smoke" (50 Cent featuring Trey Songz)	2014	—	42		Animal Ambition
"I'm Missing You" (Crunk-n-Buck featuring Trey Songz)	2014	—	—		Red Writing
"Me and My Team" (Maejor Ali featuring Trey Songz and Kid Ink)	2014	— (Note: "Me and My Team" did not enter the US Billboard Hot 100, but peaked at number 15 on the Bubbling Under Hot 100 Singles chart.)	—		Non-album singles
"Not for Long" (B.o.B featuring Trey Songz)	2014	80	26		Non-album singles
"Lonely" (Wash featuring Trey Songz)	2014	—	—		Non-album singles
"Bum Bum" (Kat DeLuna featuring Trey Songz)	2015	—	—		Loading
"Guantanamera" (Sage the Gemini featuring Trey Songz)	2015	—	—		Non-album single
"Hide & Freak" (SoMo featuring Trey Songz)	2015	—	—		My Life II
"Best Friend" (J.R. featuring Trey Songz)	2015	—	—		Non-album single
"You Mine" (DJ Khaled featuring Trey Songz, Jeremih and Future)	2015	—	55		I Changed a Lot
"Push It on Me" (Kevin "Chocolate Droppa" Hart featuring Trey Songz)	2016	— (Note: "Push It on Me" did not enter the US Billboard Hot 100, but peaked at number 14 on the Bubbling Under Hot 100 Singles chart.)	50		Kevin Hart: What Now? (The Mixtape Presents Chocolate Droppa)
"It's a Vibe" (2 Chainz featuring Ty Dolla $ign, Trey Songz and Jhené Aiko)	2017	44	20	RIAA: 4× Platinum; BPI: Silver; RMNZ: 3× Platinum	Pretty Girls Like Trap Music
"Inside" (Jacquees featuring Trey Songz)	2018	—	—	RIAA: Gold	4275
"Big Rich Town" (Power Remix) (50 Cent featuring Trey Songz and A Boogie Wit Da Hoodie)	2019	—	—		Non-album single
"Xley" (Dalex featuring Trey Songz)	2021	—	—		Unisex
"Mountain Valley" (Peter Jackson featuring Trey Songz)	2022	—	—		In God's Hands
"—" denotes releases that did not chart or receive certification.

=== Billboard Year-End performances ===
Year	Song	Year-End Position
2008	"Can't Help But Wait"	86
2010	"Say Aah"	31
2010	"Bottoms Up"	52
2011	"Bottoms Up"	64
2012	"Heart Attack"	77
2014	"Na Na"	53
2015	"Slow Motion"	64

=== Promotional singles ===
List of promotional singles, with selected chart positions, showing year released and album name
Title	Year	Peak chart		Album
Title	Year	US	US R&B	Album
"Top of the World"	2011	—	—	Inevitable and Anticipation II
"What I Be On" (featuring Fabolous)	2011	—	79	Inevitable
"Hail Mary" (featuring Young Jeezy and Lil Wayne)	2012	— (Note: "Hail Mary" did not enter the US Billboard Hot 100, but peaked at number six on the Bubbling Under Hot 100 Singles chart.)	77	Chapter V
"Pride N Joy" (Remix) (Fat Joe featuring Trey Songz, Pusha T, Ashanti and Miguel)	2012	—	—	Non-album singles
"They Don't Know" (Remix) (Rico Love featuring Ludacris, Trey Songz, Tiara Thomas, T.I., and Emjay)	2014	—	—	Non-album singles
"You're Mine (Eternal)" (Remix) (Mariah Carey featuring Trey Songz)	2014	—	—	Non-album singles
"Ordinary" (featuring Jeezy)	2014	—	—	Non-album singles
"Disrespectful" (featuring Mila J)	2014	—	—	Trigga Reloaded
"All I Want for Christmas"	2014	—	—	Non-album single
"She Lovin' It"	2017	—	—	Tremaine the Album
"When We" (Remix) (Tank featuring Trey Songz and Ty Dolla Sign)	2018	—	—	Non-album single

== Other charted and certified songs ==
List of songs, with selected chart positions, showing year released and album name
Title	Year	Peak chart positions		Certifications	Album
Title	Year	US	US R&B	Certifications	Album
"Hold U Down" (Bun B featuring Trey Songz, Mike Jones and Birdman)	2006	—	106		Trill
"Pain In My Life" (Saigon featuring Trey Songz)	2007	—	91		Moral of the Story
"Keep Me Warm (On Christmas)"	2008	—	122		Non-album singles
"The Christmas Songz"	2008	—	124		Non-album singles
"Like Me" (Just Bleezy featuring Trey Songz)	2008	—	124		Non-album singles
"Supplier" (Shawty Lo featuring Trey Songz)	2009	—	108		Bankhead Born & Raised: Carlos
"In Your Phone"	2009	—	101		Non-album single
"Beat It Up" (Gucci Mane featuring Trey Songz)	2010	—	36		The Appeal: Georgia's Most Wanted
"You Belong to Me"	2010	—	77		Ready
"Yo Side of the Bed"	2010	—	32		Ready
"The Way You Move" (Ne-Yo featuring Trey Songz and T-Pain)	2011	— (Note: "The Way You Move" did not enter the US Billboard Hot 100, but peaked at number 10 on the Bubbling Under Hot 100 Singles chart.)	—		Non-album single
"Be the One" (Lloyd featuring Trey Songz and Young Jeezy)	2011	—	122		King of Hearts
"Check Me Out" (featuring Meek Mill and Diddy)	2012	—	103		Chapter V
"Dive In"	2012	77	5	RIAA: Gold	Chapter V
"Fumble"	2013	—	56		Chapter V
"Cake"	2014	—	—	RIAA: Gold	Trigga
"All We Do"	2014	—	—	RIAA: Gold	Trigga
"Songs on 12 Play" (Chris Brown featuring Trey Songz)	2014	— (Note: "Songs on 12 Play" did not enter the US Billboard Hot 100, but peaked at number 25 on the Bubbling Under Hot 100 Singles chart.)	48		X
"Serve It Up"	2015	—	57		Trigga Reloaded
"Jam" (Kevin Gates featuring Trey Songz, Ty Dolla Sign and Jamie Foxx)	2016	97	29		Islah
"Still Waiting" (Tory Lanez featuring Trey Songz)	2019	— (Note: "Still Waiting" did not enter the US Billboard Hot 100, but peaked at number 22 on the Bubbling Under Hot 100 Singles chart.)	—		Chixtape 5
"—" denotes releases that did not chart or receive certification.

== Guest appearances ==
List of non-single songs with guest appearances by Trey Songz
Title	Year	Artist(s)	Album
"Dance with Me"	2004	Kevin Lyttle	Kevin Lyttle
"Ain't a Thug"	2004	Trick Daddy	Thug Matrimony: Married to the Streets
"Dreams" (Remix)	2005	The Game	None
"In da Game"	2005	Lil' Nikki	The Preliminaries
"Hold U Down"	2005	Bun B, Mike Jones, Baby	Trill
"Ridin' Dirty"	2005	Paul Wall	The Peoples Champ
"Heart of a Soldier"	2005	Ebony Eyez	7 Day Cycle
"50/50 Love"	2005	Trina	Glamorest Life
"Freaky As She Wanna Be"	2006	Dem Franchize Boyz	On Top of Our Game
"I Know You Know"	2006	Juvenile	Reality Check
"Ghetto"	2006	Obie Trice	Second Round's on Me
"Mama"	2006	Obie Trice	Second Round's on Me
"So High"	2006	Trick Daddy, 8Ball	Back by Thug Demand
"Gamez We Play"	2006	2Pac, Dr. Dre	Tupac Duets From NY 2 Cali
"Beautiful" (Note: "Beautiful" originally was included on Ai's 2006 single, "Believe". A remix of the song was featured on Ai's 2006 studio album What's Goin' On Ai.)	2006	Ai	What's Goin' On Ai
"¿Quién Eres Tú?"	2007	María José	María José
"Blackout (Alternate)"	2007	Lupe Fiasco	None
"Shawty" (R&B Remix)	2007	Plies, Pleasure P	The Real Testament
"She Said"	2007	Foxx	Street Gossip
"Drink It Straight"	2007	Gucci Mane	Back to the Trap House
"Spend Some $"	2007	Chingy	Hate It or Love It
"This Is the Life"	2008	Rick Ross	Trilla
"Freaky Deaky"	2008	Flo Rida	Mail on Sunday
"I'm Da Man"	2008	Plies	Definition of Real
"Bust It Baby" (Remix)	2008	Plies	Definition of Real
"That's My Word"	2008	2 Pistols	Death Before Dishonor
"One Night"	2008	Yung Berg	Look What You Made Me
"Takin' It There"	2008	Young Jeezy	The Recession
"We Global"	2008	DJ Khaled, Fat Joe, Ray J	We Global
"Love for Money"	2008	Willie the Kid, Gucci Mane, La the Darkman, Bun B, Flo Rida, Yung Joc	Absolute Greatness
"Takes Time to Love"	2009	None	Confessions of a Shopaholic
"I Ain't Playing"	2009	Bow Wow	New Jack City II
"I Know"	2009	Mike Jones	The Voice
"Love for Money"	2009	DJ Drama, Willie the Kid, Gucci Mane, La the Darkman, Bun B, Flo Rida, Yung Joc	Gangsta Grillz: The Album (Vol. 2)
"Hood Love"	2009	Maino	If Tomorrow Comes...
"Last Time"	2009	Fabolous	Loso's Way
"Pretty Brown"	2009	Amerie	In Love & War
"Ya Heard Me"	2009	B.G., Juvenile, Lil Wayne	Too Hood 2 Be Hollywood
"Wait"	2009	Chris Brown, The Game	Graffiti
"Showing Out"	2010	Trina	Amazin'
"All I Need"	2010	Rick Ross	The Albert Anastasia EP
"Kitty Kitty"	2010	Plies	Goon Affiliated
"No. 1"	2010	Rick Ross, Diddy	Teflon Don
"Right Now"	2010	Bun B, 2Pac, Pimp C	Trill OG
"Yesterday"	2010	Toni Braxton	Pulse
"Beat It Up"	2010	Gucci Mane	The Appeal: Georgia's Most Wanted
"Hey Cutie"	2010	Soulja Boy	The DeAndre Way
"Strip"	2010	T.I., Young Dro	No Mercy
"Oh My" (Remix)	2011	DJ Drama, 2 Chainz, Big Sean	Third Power
"Shawty What Your Name Is"	2011	Cuban Link	Chain Gang Bully 2
"Oh Yeah"	2012	T.I.	Fuck da City Up
"Fly Together" (Remix)	2012	Red Café, Wale, J. Cole	Hell's Kitchen
"She Got the Title"	2012	Red Café	Hell's Kitchen
"Castles"	2012	B.o.B	Strange Clouds
"She Want to Have My Baby"	2012	Game	California Republic
"The One"	2012	Celeb Forever	Make Believers
"Face Down"	2012	Meek Mill, Sam Sneaker, Wale	Dreamchasers 2
"Thug It to the Bone"	2012	Lil' Scrappy	Full Metal Jacket 2
"Til We Die"	2012	Busta Rhymes, Rick Ross	Year of the Dragon
"Lay Up"	2012	Meek Mill, Wale, Rick Ross	Dreams & Nightmares
"Good"	2012	Brianna Perry	Symphony No. 9
"Diced Pineapples"	2012	Fabolous, Cassie	The S.O.U.L. Tape 2
"Fully Loaded"	2012	Red Café, Fabolous	American Psycho
"Tonight"	2012	Young Jeezy	It's Tha World
"Church"	2012	Game, King Chip	Jesus Piece
"Same Bitch"	2013	ASAP Rocky	None
"Bad Bitches Link Up"	2013	T-Pain, Juicy J	None
"Shake It"	2013	Funkmaster Flex, Busta Rhymes, Future	Who You Mad at? Me or Yourself?
"40"	2013	French Montana, Fabolous	Excuse My French
"Twilight Zone"	2013	Sean Garrett, Future	None
"Lay You Down"	2013	Ronald Isley	This Song Is for You
"1st Night 4 A Young" (Remix)	2013	Ty Dolla Sign, Kirko Bangz	Beach House 2
"All Around the World"	2013	Nelly	M.O.
"I Luv This Shit" (Remix)	2013	August Alsina, Chris Brown	Testimony
"Show Me" (Remix)	2014	Kid Ink, Chris Brown, Juicy J, 2 Chainz	None
"Champagne Room"	2014	B.o.B, T.I., Big Kuntry King, Spodee	G.D.O.D. II
"You're Mine (Eternal) (Urban remix)"	2014	Mariah Carey	None
"Dangerous Part 2"	2014	David Guetta, Chris Brown, Sam Martin	None
"About Mine"	2015	Kid Ink	Full Speed
"Post to Be" (Remix)	2015	Omarion, DeJ Loaf, Rick Ross, Ty Dolla Sign	None
"Bum Bum"	2015	Kat DeLuna	Viva Out Loud
"What You Mean to Me"	2015	Jennifer Lopez	Finding Neverland: The Album
"See You Again" (Remix)	2015	Wiz Khalifa	None
"Go Hard or Go Home Part 2"	2015	Wiz Khalifa, French Montana, Ty Dolla Sign	Furious 7 (Deluxe)
"Know Ya"	2015	Ty Dolla Sign	Free TC
"Doin It Well"	2015	Fabolous, Nicki Minaj	Summertime Shootout
"Do It To You"	2016	The Game	The Documentary 2 (Collector's Edition)
"Back to Sleep (Remix)"	2016	Chris Brown, August Alsina, Miguel	None
"Life On Mars?"	2016	None	Vinyl Music from the HBO® Original Series - Vol. 1.6
"Jam"	2016	Kevin Gates, Jamie Foxx, Ty Dolla Sign	Islah
"Onyx"	2016	DJ Drama, Ty Dolla Sign, August Alsina	Quality Street Music 2
"Pu$$y"	2016	Ty Dolla Sign, Wiz Khalifa	Campaign
"Shabba"	2016	Wizkid, Chris Brown, French Montana	None
"Sex With Me"	2016	Fabolous, Rihanna	Summertime Shootout 2
"Stand"	2016	None	The Birth of a Nation: The Inspired By Album
"Wishing" (Remix)	2016	DJ Drama, Chris Brown, Tory Lanez, Jhene Aiko, Fabolous	None
"Dat Night"	2016	Chris Brown, Young Thug	None
"Bad and Boujee" (Remix)	2017	Fabolous	None
"The Life"	2017	Jeezy, Wizkid	Pressure
"Gbese"	2017	Wizkid	Sounds from the Other Side
"Bad Girl"	2017	A Boogie wit da Hoodie, Robin Thicke	The Bigger Artist
"S.W.I.N.G"	2018	Tory Lanez, PnB Rock	Love Me Now?
"Booty" (Remix)	2018	Blac Youngsta, Chris Brown, Jeezy	None
"Sexy"	2019	Chris Brown	Indigo
"Rise to the Top"	2019	Snoop Dogg	I Wanna Thank Me
"Blood Thicker Than Water"	2019	The Game	Born 2 Rap
"The City"	2020	Dave East	Karma 3
"30 for 40"	2021	Hitmaka, Yo Gotti, YoungBoy Never Broke Again	None
"Tight Rope"	2022	Gucci Mane	So Icy Boyz: The Finale

== Notes ==
- a. "Da Baddest" charted at number one on the Bubbling Under R&B/Hip-Hop Singles chart.
