= Between the Sheets Tour =

2015 concert tour by Chris Brown and Trey Songz

- Tour by Chris Brown and Trey Songz
- Promotional poster for the tour
- Associated album: X; Trigga
- Start date: January 27, 2015
- End date: March 8, 2015
- Legs: 1
- No. of shows: 22 in North America
- Box office: $29 million (U.S) dollars
Chris Brown tour chronology
- Carpe Diem Tour
- (2012)
- Between the Sheets Tour
- (2015)
- One Hell of a Nite Tour
- (2015–16)
Trey Songz tour chronology
- Chapter V World Tour
- (2012)
- Between the Sheets Tour
- (2015)
- Tremaine the Tour
- (2017)

The Between the Sheets Tour was a co-headlining concert tour by American recording artists Chris Brown and Trey Songz, along with rapper Tyga supporting, in support of their sixth studio albums X and Trigga, respectively. The tour began on January 27, 2015 in Hampton, Virginia and ended on March 18, 2015 in Greensboro, North Carolina.

== Set list ==
This set list is representative of the performance at the Barclays Center in Brooklyn on February 16, 2015. It does not represent all concerts on the duration of the tour.

1. "Foreign"
2. "Cake"
3. "Late Night"
4. "All We Do"
5. "Can't Be Friends"
6. "Paranoid"
7. "Can't Help but Wait"
8. "Slow Motion"
9. "I Invented Sex"
10. "X"
11. "Came to Do"
12. "Love More"
13. "Wall To Wall"
14. "Run It!"
15. "Deuces"
16. "Strip"
17. "Poppin'"
18. "Look At Me Now"
19. "She Ain't You"
20. "Lady In A Glass Dress"
21. "Take You Down"
22. "Neighbors Know My Name"
23. "No Bullshit"
24. "Panty Droppa"
25. "2012"
26. "Love Faces"
27. "Don't Judge Me"
28. "Dive In"
29. "Songs on 12 Play"
30. "Say Aah"
31. "She Knows"
32. "Trap Queen"
33. "Bottoms Up"
34. "Na Na"
35. "Touchin, Lovin"
36. "New Flame"
37. "What Up Gangsta"
38. "Many Men"
39. "Ayo"
40. "Loyal"

== Shows ==
List of concerts, showing date, city, country, venue, opening act, tickets sold, number of available tickets and amount of gross revenue
Date	City	Country	Venue	Opening act	Attendance	Revenue
North America
January 27, 2015	Hampton	United States	Hampton Coliseum	Tyga	—N/a	—N/a
February 5, 2015	New Orleans	United States	Smoothie King Center	Tyga	—N/a	—N/a
February 6, 2015	Dallas	United States	American Airlines Center	Tyga	—N/a	—N/a
February 7, 2015	Houston	United States	Toyota Center	Tyga	—N/a	—N/a
February 12, 2015	Sunrise	United States	BB&T Center	Tyga	—N/a	—N/a
February 14, 2015	Columbus	United States	Nationwide Arena	Tyga	—N/a	—N/a
February 15, 2015	Detroit	United States	Joe Louis Arena	Tyga	—N/a	—N/a
February 16, 2015	Brooklyn	United States	Barclays Center	Tyga	12,271 / 13,837 (89%)	$1,581,841
February 18, 2015	Philadelphia	United States	Wells Fargo Center	Tyga	—N/a	—N/a
February 19, 2015	Worcester	United States	DCU Center	Tyga	—N/a	—N/a
February 20, 2015	Bridgeport	United States	Webster Bank Arena	Tyga	—N/a	—N/a
February 21, 2015	East Rutherford	United States	Izod Center	Tyga	—N/a	—N/a
February 22, 2015	Washington, D.C.	United States	Verizon Center	Tyga	—N/a	—N/a
February 27, 2015	Rosemont	United States	Allstate Arena	Tyga	—N/a	—N/a
February 28, 2015	Cincinnati	United States	U.S. Bank Arena	Tyga	8,087 / 10,514 (77%)	$851,296
March 1, 2015	Nashville	United States	Bridgestone Arena	Tyga	12,118 / 13,796 (88%)	$826,739
March 2, 2015	Atlanta	United States	Philips Arena	Tyga	11,868 / 12,191 (97%)	$1,081,049
March 6, 2015	San Jose	United States	SAP Center	Tyga	—N/a	—N/a
March 7, 2015	Las Vegas	United States	Mandalay Bay Events Center	Tyga	—N/a	—N/a
March 8, 2015	Inglewood	United States	The Forum	Tyga	13,093 / 13,093 (100%)	$1,501,732
March 14, 2015	Charlotte	United States	Time Warner Cable Arena	Tyga	—N/a	—N/a
March 18, 2015	Greensboro	United States	Greensboro Coliseum	Tyga	—N/a	—N/a
Total					57,437 / 63,431 (91%)	$5,842,657

== Cancelled shows ==
List of cancelled concerts, showing date, city, country, venue and reason for cancellation
Date	City	Country	Venue	Reason
January 31, 2015	Baltimore	United States	Royal Farms Arena	Hazardous weather conditions
February 24, 2015	Montreal	Canada	Bell Centre	Immigration issues
February 25, 2015	Toronto	Canada	Air Canada Centre	Immigration issues
March 3, 2015	Minneapolis	United States	Target Center	Scheduling conflicts/Low ticket sells
