= Smartphone (disambiguation) =

A smartphone is a mobile phone with computer-like capabilities.

Smartphone, smartphones, etc. may also refer to:

- "Smartphone", a song by Cory Marks from the album This Man
- "SmartPhones" (song), a song by Trey Songz from the album Trigga
