= Tanaya Henry =

American jewelry designer and model

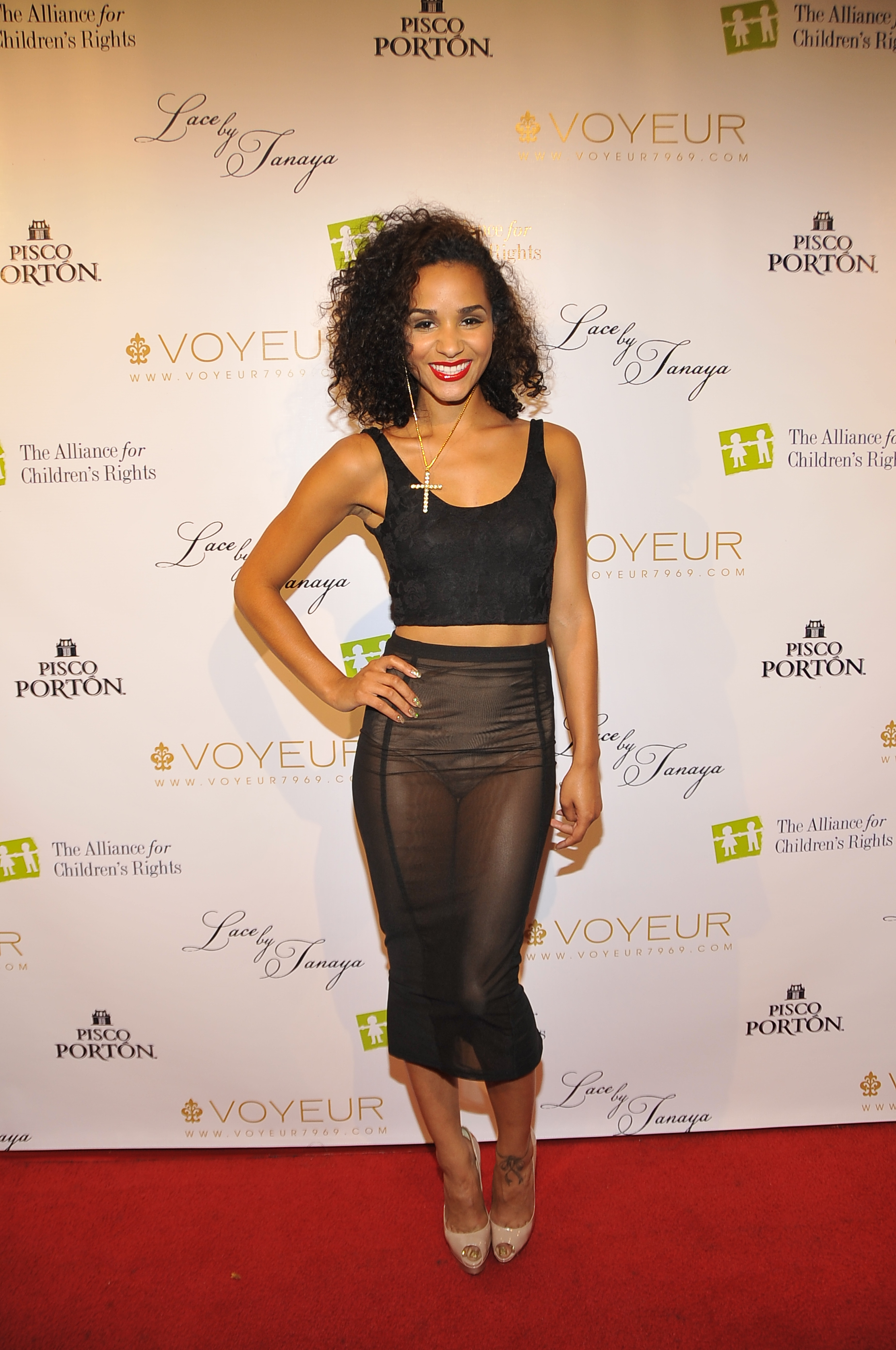
Henry in 2011

Tanaya Henry is an American jewelry designer and model from Minnesota.

== Career ==
She graduated from Prior Lake Senior High in 2006.

Shortly after moving to Texas, Henry signed with Wilhelmina Models.

Henry gained attention when she became a human billboard for her year-long She Wears Your Tee campaign in 2010. Henry, Kareem Rahma, and Michael Schwengel came up with the idea to sell the days on her calendar to companies in exchange for promotion. This marketing technique attracted media coverage. The site featured a calendar where reservations could be made by the day for Henry's marketing services, with the price increasing by $1 per day. Companies participating included Adidas, Vimeo, Groupon, and hip-hop group Atmosphere. She later moved into a warehouse in Hoboken, New Jersey called the Pudding Factory, owned by photographer River Clark, with whom she collaborated.

Henry worked as a go-go dancer at multiple New York City nightclubs to fund her budding jewelry business. One evening, her earlace caught the attention of Alicia Keys' stylist. Weeks later, the earrings were on the cover of the last issue of Giant Magazine worn by Keys. She then created different variations of the earlace, catching the eye of stylists like Mariel Haenn (Rihanna) and Niki Schwan (Nicki Minaj) through one of Henry's best friends, stylist Maeve Reilly. One of the variations of Henry's earlace appeared in Nicki Minaj's "Your Love" music video.

Lace by Tanaya has been featured in The Huffington Post.

In 2015, Henry appeared as the love interest in Trey Songz music video for "Slow Motion".

== Filmography (including music videos) ==
Year	Title	Role
2015	"Slow Motion"	Featured
2010	Gun	Featured
2009	Hunting Shadows	Valeska
2012	"I Want You"	Featured
2011	"It Ain't Over 'til It's Over"	Featured
2011	"Body 2 Body"	Featured
2011	"Birthday Dress"	Lead
2011	"Work Out"	Featured
2011	"Try"	Lead
2010	"Fall for Your Type"	Featured
2010	"All I Want Is You"	Lead
2010	"Pretty Girls"	Featured
2009	"Press It Up"	Featured
