= Nobody Else but You =

Nobody Else but You may refer to:

- Nobody Else but You (film), a 2011 French comedy crime mystery by Gérald Hustache-Mathieu
- "Nobody Else but You" (Trey Songz song), a 2017 single from Tremaine the Album
- "Nobody Else but Me", a 1946 song by Jerome Kern and Oscar Hammerstein II
- "Nobody Else but You", a song by Bette Midler on the 2000 album Bette

== See also ==
- Nobody Else but Me (album), a 1994 studio album by Stan Getz
