= Not for Long =

Single by B.o.B featuring Trey Songz
- Released: October 14, 2014
- Length: 3:35
- Label: Rebel Rock; Grand Hustle; Atlantic
- Songwriters: Alexander Izquierdo; Paris Jones; Tremaine Neverson; Mark Nilan, Jr.; Paulo Rodriguez; Bobby Simmons, Jr.
- Producers: P-Lo; Mark Nilan

B.o.B singles chronology
"Red Cup" (2014)	"Not for Long" (2014)	"Hood Go Crazy" (2015)

Trey Songz singles chronology
"Touchin, Lovin" (2014)	"Not for Long" (2014)	"Lonely" (2014)

Music video
- "Not for Long" on YouTube

"Not for Long" is a song by American hip hop recording artist B.o.B. It was released on October 14, 2014, as a standalone single. The song, which was produced by P-Lo and Mark Nilan, and written by Paris Jones. It features guest vocals from American R&B singer Trey Songz.

== Music video ==
An official lyrics video for the song was released on October 13, 2014, through B.o.B's YouTube channel. On November 17, 2014, a behind-the-scenes clip was also posted on the channel, and the following day the music video of "Not for Long" directed by Jerome D., was released.

== Track listing ==
Digital single

No.	Title	Producer(s)	Length
1.	"Not for Long" (featuring Trey Songz)	P-Lo, Mark Nilan	3:35

== Charts ==
Chart (2014–15)	Peak position
US Billboard Hot 100	80
US Hot R&B/Hip-Hop Songs (Billboard)	26
