= Playboy (Trey Songz song) =

Single by Trey Songz

from the album Tremaine the Album
- Released: February 14, 2017
- Recorded: 2016
- Genre: R&B
- Length: 4:16
- Label: Songbook; Atlantic
- Songwriter: Tremaine Neverson
- Producers: Rico Love; Earl & E; D-Town

Trey Songz singles chronology
"Nobody Else but You" (2017)	"Playboy" (2017)	"It's a Vibe" (2017)

"Playboy" is a song by American singer Trey Songz, released as the second single from Tremaine the Album, on February 14, 2017.

== Critical reception ==
Revolt's Maurita Salkey said that it has a "smooth R&B style and vocals, powered with his usual theme of love, sex, and passion. [...] Trey expresses his feelings on finding true love and slowly wanting to change his playboy ways [...] deliver[ing] a much more mature sound in which fans will be appreciative of". John Kennedy of Vibe called the song "conflicted", praising its "'90s slow jam vibes and exquisite falsetto". Maeve McDermott of USA Today commended the song, stating that on the song while "hint[ing] at his lothario status, Songz promises he's a better man than his behavior makes him seem".
