= Anticipation II =

Mixtape by Trey Songz
- Released: November 1, 2011
- Recorded: 2011
- Studios: Songbook Studio House, (Miami, Florida)
- Genre: Alternative R&B
- Label: Atlantic
- Producer: Troy Taylor

Trey Songz chronology
Passion, Pain & Pleasure (2010)	Anticipation II (2011)	Inevitable (2011)

Anticipation II is a mixtape by American singer Trey Songz, released on November 1, 2011.

On April 24, 2020, Trey Songz re-released the mixtape on streaming platforms, with the original mixtape in the series Anticipation.

== Background and composition ==
Songz described the material worked for the mixtape as the most "pure" of his, at the time, recent discography. He stated: "Historically, my mixtapes have served as a creative outlet for me to serve my fans without the pressure of creating records solely for sales, this time around the music came out particularly real and good".

Anticipation II is filled with R&B and alternative R&B slow-jams. The lyrical content is for the vast majority about sex, with a songwriting that has been described as "very sultry" and "explicit".

During a 2020 interview with Uproxx, when asked about what his best project to date was, the singer said it was Anticipation II, stating:

It is one of my truest bodies of work because it was what I wanted to do. In every album, at the end, it was a process where we met with the label, and I would say it was a joint decision that these are the best songs, but those albums wouldn’t be those albums had it been up to me. They would have been different. I feel like the truest albums you’ve gotten from me are albums where there wasn’t any input from anybody else but me and Troy Taylor. That’s what happened with this album.

== Release and promotion ==
The mixtape was released on November 1, 2011, along with the hip-hop mixtape #LemmeHolDatBeat2 on the same day.

In 2012, Songz performed the mixtape on stage, supporting it with The Anticipation 2our with 19 shows in North America.

In 2020 the project was finally released on all streaming platforms.

== Critical reception ==
Professional ratings
Review scores
Source	Rating
AllMusic	4.5/5 stars

AllMusic's writer Andy Kellman gave it four and half out of five stars saying "The R&B singer whispers the most nasty things possible, with impeccable sensual melodies over slow, dark and electronic beats. He overcomes himself on the mesmerizing "Inside Pt 2", using the sound of a woman's orgasm with the same functioning of a guitar solo".

== Track listing ==
No.	Title	Length
1.	"Find a Place"	3:56
2.	"Still Scratchin Me Up"	4:40
3.	"When We Make Love"	4:45
4.	"Me 4 U / Infidelity Pt 2"	4:30
5.	"Don't Judge"	3:26
6.	"Inside Pt 2"	4:10
7.	"Good Feelings"	3:06
8.	"Bomb (A.P.)"	3:52
9.	"Flights & Skype"	3:56
10.	"Girl at Home"	3:31
11.	"French Kiss"	4:11
12.	"Girl on Girl"	3:49
13.	"U Should Roll..."	4:12
14.	"Top of the World"	4:51
15.	"She Needs Me"	3:20
