= Intermission I & II =

EP by Trey Songz
- Released: May 18, 2015
- Recorded: 2015
- Genre: R&B; hip hop
- Length: 45:30
- Label: Songbook; Atlantic
- Producer: Trey Songz; Da Internz; saaj; Cardiak; Dun Deal; Sean Momberger; Young N Fly; Amadeus; DJ A-Wall; The Breed; DrewsThatDude; DJ Spinz; Hitmaka

Trey Songz chronology
Trigga (2014)	Intermission I & II (2015)	Trigga Reloaded (2015)

Intermission I & II is a double extended play (EP) by American singer Trey Songz, released on May 18, 2015 in the United States.

== Background ==
While Songz was serving as a supporting guest on the European leg of The Pinkprint Tour with Nicki Minaj, in support of his last album Trigga (2014), along with Chris Brown and Tyga was doing sold-out shows on the Between The Sheets Tour. He released the EP as a surprise to keep his fans from waiting for new material until Trigga: Reloaded and Tremaine are released later in 2015. The second part was released in May, which added six more tracks to the EP, the whole thing was dropped on iTunes.

== Track listing ==
Intermission 1
No.	Title	Producer(s)	Length
1.	"Intermission (Intro)"	Trey Songz	1:50
2.	"Don't Play"	Da Internz	3:53
3.	"Boss" (featuring Chisanity)	Sean Momberger	3:26
4.	"Do It Now"	Cardiak; Hitmaka; Young N Fly	4:16
5.	"Talk About It"	Amadeus; The Breed	3:40
6.	"Change"	saaj; DJ A-Wall	2:54

Intermission 2
No.	Title	Producer(s)	Length
7.	"How Could You Forget" (featuring Pusha T)	Triple B.	4:46
8.	"#FWYB"		3:44
9.	"Company"		3:59
10.	"Flick"		3:15
11.	"Chill"	saaj; DrewsThatDude	4:33
12.	"Hard Times"	Dun Deal; DJ Spinz	5:14

Notes

- Originally, on Intermission 1, track 4 was the song "Good Girls vs. Bad Girls", which contained a sample of "Come Thru" by Jacquees.

== Charts ==
Chart (2015)	Peak position
US Billboard 200	52
US Top R&B/Hip-Hop Albums (Billboard)	6
