= Animal (Trey Songz song) =

Single by Trey Songz

from the album Tremaine the Album
- Released: March 17, 2017
- Recorded: 2017
- Length: 4:16
- Label: Songbook; Atlantic
- Songwriter: Tremaine Neverson
- Producers: Made in China; Osta; Cirkut; Jmike

Trey Songz singles chronology
"It's a Vibe" (2017)	"Animal" (2017)	"Song Goes Off" (2017)

Music video
- "Animal" on YouTube

"Animal" is a song by American singer Trey Songz, released as the third single from Tremaine the Album, on March 17, 2017.

== Charts ==
Chart performance for "Animal"
Chart (2017)	Peak position
US Bubbling Under Hot 100 (Billboard)	1
US Hot R&B/Hip-Hop Songs (Billboard)	29
