= Anticipation (mixtape) =

Mixtape by Trey Songz
- Released: June 30, 2009
- Recorded: 2008–09
- Genre: R&B
- Label: Songbook; Atlantic

Trey Songz chronology
Trey Day (2007)	Anticipation (2009)	Ready (2009)

Anticipation is a mixtape American singer Trey Songz, released on June 30, 2009.

On April 24, 2020, Trey Songz re-released the mixtape on streaming platforms, with the sequel mixtape Anticipation II.

== Background ==
Trey Songz talked about Anticipation's working during an interview with Billboard magazine, saying that: "The creation of Anticipation is for my fans, I want to give them something to listen to before Ready comes out. My fans are eagerly anticipating Ready so I am giving them something to help get ready for the direction of the new album. I just started recording on my days off and the music felt great. This is music without creative boundaries."

The track "It Would Be You" would later be covered by Johnny Gill on his 2011 album, Still Winning.

== Track listing ==
No.	Title	Length
1.	"Famous"	3:40
2.	"Showerlude"	1:20
3.	"Scratchin' Me Up"	4:09
4.	"Does She Know"	4:08
5.	"Infidelity"	3:44
6.	"You Belong to Me"	3:55
7.	"More Than That"	4:07
8.	"On Top"	4:16
9.	"It Would Be You"	3:41
10.	"Make It Rain"	4:00
11.	"Yo Side of the Bed"	4:10
12.	"She Ain't My Gurl" (featuring Sammie)	4:07
13.	"Successful (Live)"	3:34
