= Last Time (Trey Songz song) =

Single by Trey Songz

from the album Trey Day
- Released: January 25, 2008
- Recorded: 2007
- Genre: R&B
- Length: 4:22
- Label: Atlantic
- Songwriter(s): Tamir "Nokio" Ruffin; Tremaine Neverson; Kendrick A.J. Dean; Quinton Amey; Bryan-Michael Cox
- Producer(s): Bryan-Michael Cox; Kendrick "WyldCard" Dean

Trey Songz singles chronology
"Can't Help but Wait" (2007)	"Last Time" (2008)	"Missin' You" (2008)

"Last Time" is the third single from R&B recording artist Trey Songz's album Trey Day. The single debuted at number 118 on the US R&B chart on its second week of release.

== Chart performance ==
Last Time has become Trey Songz second consecutive top-ten R&B hit, with "Can't Help But Wait" peaking at number two and "Last Time" peaking at number nine.

== Charts ==
=== Weekly charts ===
Chart (2008)	Peak position
US Billboard Hot 100	69
US Hot R&B/Hip-Hop Songs (Billboard)	9

=== Year-end charts ===
Chart (2008)	Position
US Hot R&B/Hip-Hop Songs (Billboard)	32
