= Nobody Else but You (Trey Songz song) =

Single by Trey Songz

from the album Tremaine the Album
- Released: February 12, 2017
- Recorded: 2016
- Length: 3:48
- Label: Songbook; Atlantic
- Songwriter: Tremaine Neverson
- Producer: Isaak

Trey Songz singles chronology
| "Push It on Me" (2016) | "Nobody Else but You" (2017) | "Playboy" (2017) |

"Nobody Else but You" is a song by American singer Trey Songz, released as the lead single from Tremaine the Album, on February 12, 2017.

== Critical reception ==
Revolt's Maurita Salkey complimented its lyrics, saying that "the singer rarely sounded this romantic". John Kennedy of Vibe said that in the song "[h]e redeems himself [...] staring in the mirror wondering why he takes his relationship for granted". Maeve Mcdermott of USA Today said that the song was a right choice as the lead single of the album, defining it as a "bubbly lead single".

== Charts ==
Chart performance for "Nobody Else but You"
| Chart (2017) | Peak position |
|---|---|
| US Billboard Hot 100 | 92 |
| US Hot R&B/Hip-Hop Songs (Billboard) | 35 |

== Certifications ==
Certifications for "Nobody Else but You"
| Region | Certification | Certified units/sales |
|---|---|---|
| United States (RIAA) | Platinum | 1,000,000^{‡} |
^{‡} Sales+streaming figures based on certification alone.
