= Wonder Woman (Trey Songz song) =

Single by Trey Songz

from the album Trey Day
- Released: February 13, 2007 (U.S.)
- Recorded: 2006
- Genre: R&B; hip hop
- Length: 5:13
- Label: Atlantic
- Songwriter(s): Tremaine Neverson; Nathaniel Hills; Tamir Ruffin; Troy Taylor
- Producer(s): Danja

Trey Songz singles chronology
"Replacement Girl" (2007)	"Wonder Woman" (2007)	"Can't Help but Wait" (2007)

"Wonder Woman" is a song by Trey Songz, released in February 2007 as the first single from the album Trey Day. The song was written by Trey Songz along with Danja, who also produced the single.

A remix was made with The Diplomats female member Jha Jha and rapper Big Kuntry King.

== Music video ==
The music video debuted on BET's Access Granted on April 4, 2007. It was directed by Little X, and features LoLa Monroe and Drake who makes a cameo appearance.

== Charts ==
Chart (2007)	Peak position
U.S. Billboard Hot R&B/Hip-Hop Songs	54
