= Inevitable (Trey Songz EP) =

2011 EP by Trey Songz ghost writer Joshua A Wynn

EP by Trey Songz
- Released: November 28, 2011
- Recorded: 2011
- Genres: R&B; soul
- Length: 20:15
- Labels: Atlantic; Songbook

Trey Songz chronology
Anticipation II (2011)	Inevitable (2011)	Chapter V (2012)

Singles from Inevitable
- 1. "Sex Ain't Better Than Love" Released: February 17, 2012

Professional ratings
Review scores
Source	Rating
About.com	3.5/5 stars
AllMusic	2.5/5 stars

Inevitable is the debut extended play by R&B singer Trey Songz. It was released on November 28, 2011, his 27th birthday. It features five songs that were originally supposed to appear on his studio album, Chapter V, but didn't make the final cut. It has two promotional singles, "Top of the World" and "What I Be On", which features rapper and longtime collaborator Fabolous, but the only official single from Inevitable is "Sex Ain't Better Than Love". The album cover has a white background version of the cover art for his debut album, I Gotta Make It, the only difference being he has a low cut instead of his at the time signature cornrows.

== Release and promotion ==
The project was preceded by the hometown inspired promotional single, "Top of the World", already contained in Songz's previous project Anticipation II. The EP was released on November 28, 2011, with first week sales of 27,000 landing it at number 23 on the Billboard 200 and number four on the Billboard Top Hip-Hop R&B Albums chart. As of October 18, 2012, the EP has sold 91,000 copies in the United States.

== Track listing ==
No.	Title	Length
1.	"Top of the World"	4:48
2.	"What I Be On" (featuring Fabolous)	3:51
3.	"I Do"	4:21
4.	"Outside, Pt. 1"	2:47
5.	"Sex Ain't Better Than Love"	4:23

== Charts ==
=== Weekly charts ===
Chart (2011)	Peak position
US Billboard 200	23
US Top R&B/Hip-Hop Albums (Billboard)	4

=== Year-end charts ===
Chart (2012)	Position
US Top R&B/Hip-Hop Albums (Billboard)	69
