= Touchin, Lovin =

Single by Trey Songz featuring Nicki Minaj

from the album Trigga
- Released: September 9, 2014
- Recorded: 2013
- Genre: Electro-R&B
- Length: 3:42
- Label: Songbook; Atlantic
- Songwriters: Tremaine Neverson; Onika Maraj; Christopher Featherstone; Justin Featherstone; Matthew Featherstone; William Featherstone; Frank Brim; Kevin Ross; Christopher Wallace; Robert Kelly; Sean Combs; Daron Jones
- Producer: The Featherstones

Trey Songz singles chronology
"What's Best For You" (2014)	"Touchin, Lovin" (2014)	"Not for Long" (2014)

Nicki Minaj singles chronology
"Flawless (Remix)" (2014)	"Touchin, Lovin" (2014)	"Only" (2014)

"Touchin, Lovin" is a song by American singer Trey Songz, taken from his sixth studio album, Trigga (2014). The song features production from The Featherstones and a guest verse from Nicki Minaj. This is their second collaboration, the first being "Bottoms Up". The song interpolates The Notorious B.I.G.'s song "Fuck You Tonight". It was released on September 9, 2014 as the sixth official single from Trigga.

== Music video ==
The music video directed by Jason Zada was released on December 1, 2014. The video shows Trey Songz in a front of black background. Fans are allowed to click several symbols with different interaction effects of Trey and the girls.

The video began with Trey waking up from his bed and being offered two pills by a woman. If the red pill was chosen, a red-clad woman would come out of a red rose. If the blue pill was chosen, a woman with a white furry cloak would come out of a frozen tree. The next option is between a burning ice and a mirror. If the burning ice was chosen, two girls, one with red body paint and flames around her body, and the other one with blue body paint, would approach Trey. If the mirror was chosen. A woman in a black bikini will come out, the woman will slowly disappear in shadow. The third option is between a blue scarf and a diamond. If the scarf was chosen, a blond girl would come out and lip-sync the lyrics. If the diamond was chosen, a woman in a shiny diamond dress will come out. Nicki Minaj's part began with her sitting on a throne with a cane, and a few scene with Trey. The last option is between a withered tree with two snakes on top of it and a flock of butterfly. If the tree was chosen, a snake-dancer with a helmet will appear and seduce Trey with dances and snakes. If the butterfly flock was chosen, a girl will come out and summon a flock of butterfly towards Trey. The video ends with Trey waking up from a dream.

== Track listing ==
Digital download
No.	Title	Length
1.	"Touchin, Lovin (featuring Nicki Minaj)"	3:42

== Charts and certifications ==
=== Weekly charts ===
Chart (2014)	Peak position
Australia (ARIA)	88
Germany (Deutsche Black Charts)	4
UK Singles (OCC)	70
UK Hip Hop/R&B (OCC)	10
US Billboard Hot 100	43
US Hot R&B/Hip-Hop Songs (Billboard)	12
US R&B/Hip-Hop Airplay (Billboard)	5
US Pop Airplay (Billboard)	37
US Rhythmic Airplay (Billboard)	1

=== Year-end charts ===
Chart (2014)	Position
US Hot R&B/Hip-Hop Songs (Billboard)	51
US Rhythmic (Billboard)	36

=== Certifications ===
Region	Certification	Certified units/sales
New Zealand (RMNZ)	Platinum	30,000^{‡}
United Kingdom (BPI)	Silver	200,000^{‡}
United States (RIAA)	Platinum	1,000,000^{‡}
^{‡} Sales+streaming figures based on certification alone.

== Release history ==
Region	Date	Format	Label
United States	September 9, 2014	Urban contemporary radio	Songbook; Atlantic
United Kingdom	January 3, 2015	Radio airplay	Atlantic
