= SmartPhones (song) =

Single by Trey Songz

from the album Trigga
- Released: April 1, 2014
- Length: 3:52
- Label: Songbook; Atlantic
- Songwriters: Tremaine Neverson; Samuel Jean; Bryan Nelson; Alvin Isaacs; Sam Cook
- Producers: Composer; Alvin Isaacs

Trey Songz singles chronology
"Na Na" (2014)	"SmartPhones" (2014)	"Foreign" (2014)

"SmartPhones" is a song by American singer Trey Songz, released on April 1, 2014, as the second single from his sixth studio album, Trigga.

== Critical reception ==
Marcus Dowling of HipHopDX said the song was about "dealing with the moment when a man in the midst of sneaking around drunk dials his current mate and he's caught in his error". Erin Lowers of XXL complimented Songz' vocal performance on the song, and said that it offers "a glimpse at the more introspective and vulnerable side of Trey’s discography".

== Charts ==
Weekly chart performance for "SmartPhones"
Chart (2014)	Peak position
US Bubbling Under Hot 100 (Billboard)	15
US Hot R&B/Hip-Hop Songs (Billboard)	35
