= Trey Day =

Studio album by Trey Songz
- Released: October 2, 2007
- Genre: R&B
- Length: 51:12
- Label: Atlantic
- Producers: Johnta Austin; Bryan Michael Cox; Danja; Dre & Vidal; Eric Hudson; Jimmy Jam & Terry Lewis; R. Kelly; Bei Maejor; Dave "Hard Drive" Pensado; The Runners; Miykal Snoddy; Stargate; Troy Taylor

Trey Songz chronology
I Gotta Make It (2005)	Trey Day (2007)	Anticipation (2009)

Singles from Trey Day
- 1. "Wonder Woman" Released: February 13, 2007; 2. "Can't Help but Wait" Released: August 6, 2007; 3. "Last Time" Released: January 25, 2008; 4. "Missin' You" Released: June 20, 2008

Trey Day is the second album by the American R&B recording artist Trey Songz. It was released on October 2, 2007, by Atlantic Records. Recording for the album began in mid-2006, with Songz teaming with longtime collaborator Troy Taylor. With the singer aiming for the album to be more mainstream-oriented than his debut album I Gotta Make It (2005), he also consulted a wider range of producers to work with him, including Bryan-Michael Cox, Danja, Stargate and R. Kelly.

The album was met with generally lukewarm critical reception, who deemed it inferior to his debut album, I Gotta Make It (2005). Trey Day debuted at number 11 on the US Billboard 200, with 73,000 copies sold in the first week of release. It also reached number 2 on Billboard's Top R&B/Hip-Hop Albums chart. The album was supported by four singles, including "Can't Help but Wait," Songz' first Top 20 entry on the US Billboard Hot 100 as well as the Hot R&B/Hip-Hop Songs hit single, "Last Time."

== Promotion ==
"Wonder Woman," produced by Danja, was released as the album's lead single on February 13, 2007. It peaked at number 54 on the US Hot R&B/Hip-Hop Songs chart. "Can't Help but Wait," the second single from Trey Day, was officially released on August 6, 2007. Produced by Tor E. Hermansen and Mikkel S. Eriksen from Norwegian duo Stargate, it became Songz' his highest-charting single on the US Billboard Hot 100 yet, peaking at number 14. It also reached number two on the Hot R&B/Hip-Hop Songs chart and was nominated in the Best Male R&B Vocal Performance category at the 2009 Grammy Awards.

"Last Time", produced by Bryan-Michael Cox along with Kendrick "WyldCard" Dean, was officially issued on January 25, 2008, as the album's third single. While not as commercially successful as "Can't Help but Wait," it became Songz' second top ten hit on the Hot R&B/Hip-Hop Songs chart, peaking at number nine. "Missin' You", which again was also produced by Stargate, was officially released on June 20, 2008, as the album's fourth and final single. It failed to chart.

== Critical reception ==
Professional ratings
Review scores
Source	Rating
About.com	2.5/5 stars
AllMusic	3/5 stars
DJBooth.net	3/5 stars

Nathan Slavik from DJBooth.net noted that with Trey Day, Songz "is making a not-so-subtle move towards hip-hop." While he called the project "a perfectly enjoyable R&B/hip-hop album," Slavik was critical with Songz decision to abandon the "60's R&B-laced" sound of his debut album in favor of "mainstream R&B with mixed results." AllMusic noted that with Trey Day Songz "fluctuates between heartfelt sensitivity ("Can't Help But Wait," "Missin You," "We Should Be"), anguished new jack swing ("Long Gone Missin," "Last Time"), and overtly sexual ballads ("No Clothes On," "Sex For Yo Stereo," "Role Play")."

== Commercial performance ==
Trey Day debuted at number 11 on the US Billboard 200 chart, selling 73,000 copies in the first week. This marked an improvement on his previous album I Gotta Make It which had debuted at number 20 on the US Billboard 200 first week sales of 40,000 copies in 2005. In September 2010, Billboard reported that the album had sold 346,000 units in the United States by then. On July 20, 2016, the album was certified gold by the Recording Industry Association of America (RIAA) for shipments figures over 500,000 units in the United States.

== Track listing ==
Trey Day track listing
No.	Title	Writer(s)	Producer(s)	Length
1.	"Can't Help but Wait"	Johntá Austin; Mikkel Storleer Eriksen; Tor Erik Hermansen	Stargate	3:24
2.	"Long Gone Missin'"	Tremaine Neverson; Brandon Green; Troy Taylor	Maejor; Taylor	3:35
3.	"Wonder Woman"	Neverson; Floyd Nathaniel Hills; Tamir "Nokio" Ruffin; Taylor	Danja	5:16
4.	"No Clothes On"	Neverson; Andrew Harr; Bernard Freeman; Kevin Cossom; Jermaine Jackson; Taylor	The Runners	3:34
5.	"Sex for Yo Stereo"	Neverson; Miykal "Mike" Snoddy; Ruffin; Taylor	Mike Snoddy; Taylor	3:39
6.	"Last Time"	Neverson; Bryan-Michael Cox; Kendrick A.J. Dean; Quinton Amey; Taylor	Cox; Kendrick "WyldCard" Dean^{[a]}	4:21
7.	"Intro: Trey Day" (featuring Bun B)		Bei Maejor	1:08
8.	"Grub On"	Robert Kelly; Neverson; Taylor	R. Kelly	3:42
9.	"Fly Together" (featuring Jim Jones)	Neverson; Eric Hudson; Jimmy Jones	Hudson	4:26
10.	"Store Run"	Neverson; Andre Harris; Balewa Muhammad; Candice Nelson; Ezekiel "Leke" Lewis; Patrick "J. Que" Smith; Vidal Davis	Dre & Vidal	4:38
11.	"Missin' You"	Eriksen; Taj Jackson; Hermansen	Stargate	3:34
12.	"Role Play"	Neverson; Ruffin; Taylor	Taylor	3:59
13.	"We Should Be"	Neverson; James Q. Wright; James Harris II; Terry Lewis	Jam & Lewis	5:56

iTunes Store (bonus track version)
No.	Title	Writer(s)	Producer(s)	Length
14.	"Are U a Performa" (featuring Yung Joc)	Green; Scotty Massenburg; Neverson; Ai Uemura	Maejor	3:49
15.	"Can't Help but Wait" (Music video)	Austin; Eriksen; Hermansen	Stargate	3:40

Japan version
No.	Title	Writer(s)	Producer(s)	Length
14.	"Fades Away"	Taylor	Dave "Hard Drive" Pensado	3:07
15.	"Are U a Performa" (featuring Ai)	Green; Massenburg; Neverson; Uemura	Maejor	3:51

Notes

- ^{^[a]} signifies co-producer(s)

== Personnel ==
- Tremaine Aldon Neverson (Trey Songz) – background vocals, executive producer, vocal producer
- Troy Taylor – background vocals, engineer, executive producer, vocal engineer, vocal producer
- Phillip Lamont "Taj" Jackson, Candice Nelson – background vocals
- Mikkel Storleer Eriksen – background vocals, engineer, instrumentation
- Bryan-Michael Cox – bass, drums, horn, keyboards, programming
- Vidal Davis, Andre Harris – instrumentation
- Kevin Hanson – guitars
- Kevin Liles – executive producer
- Herb Powers – mastering
- Marcella Araica, Vincent Dilorenzo, Matt Marrin, Sam Thomas – engineers
- Dylan "3-D" Dresdow, Vincent Dilorenzo, Jimmy Douglass, Fabian Marasciullo, Marco Reyes, Matt Marrin, Dave Pensado, Phil Tan – mixing

== Charts ==
=== Weekly charts ===
Weekly chart performance for Trey Day
Chart (2007)	Peak position
US Billboard 200	11
US Top R&B/Hip-Hop Albums (Billboard)	2

=== Year-end charts ===
2007 year-end chart performance for Trey Day
Chart (2007)	Position
US Top R&B/Hip-Hop Albums (Billboard)	77

2008 year-end chart performance for Trey Day
Chart (2008)	Position
US Top R&B/Hip-Hop Albums (Billboard)	56

== Certifications ==
Certifications for Trey Day
Region	Certification	Certified units/sales
United States (RIAA)	Gold	346,000

== Release history ==
Release dates and formats for Trey Day
Region	Date	Format(s)	Label(s)	Ref.
United States	October 2, 2007	CD; digital download	Atlantic	
