= Tremaine the Album =

Studio album by Trey Songz
- Released: March 24, 2017
- Recorded: 2016–2017
- Genre: R&B
- Length: 58:20
- Label: Songbook; Atlantic
- Producer: A-Wall; Alexander Isaak; C4; Cardiak; Cirkut; Composer; Cook Classics; D-Town; Earl & E; Gitty; Guitar Boy; JMIKE; Jeremy Snyder; MADE IN CHINA; Pip Kembo; Posta; Poo Bear; Rico Love; Ryan Ogren; $K; Sermstyle; Sons of Sonix; Troy Taylor; Xeryus G.

Trey Songz chronology
Trigga Reloaded (2015)	Tremaine the Album (2017)	Back Home (2020)

Singles from Tremaine the Album
- 1. "Nobody Else but You" Released: February 12, 2017; 2. "Playboy" Released: February 14, 2017; 3. "Animal" Released: March 17, 2017; 4. "Song Goes Off" Released: September 25, 2017; 5. "The Sheets... Still" Released: December 29, 2017

Tremaine the Album (or simplified as Tremaine) is the seventh studio album by American singer and songwriter Trey Songz. It was released on March 24, 2017, by Troy Taylor's Songbook label, with distribution from Atlantic Records. The album follows suit to Songz' sixth studio album, Trigga (2014).

Musically it's an R&B album about the toughness of changing a playboy lifestyle to a romantic one. The album was supported by five singles: "Nobody Else but You", "Playboy", "Animal", "Song Goes Off", and "The Sheets... Still". The album peaked at number three on the Billboard 200, and was certified gold by the Recording Industry Association of America (RIAA) for combined sales and album-equivalent units of over 500,000 units in the United States. Tremaine was met with generally positive reviews from contemporary music critics.

== Background ==
Trey Songz said, during an interview with iHeartRadio, that with the album he wanted to be more vulnerable to his audience, also giving a sound that "is more genuinely what R&B means to [him] and what it has meant to [his] career", compared to the club-R&B sound of its "brash [and] bravado" predecessor Trigga. When asked about Tremaine's lyrical theme he said:

I wouldn't say the overall theme of the album is me trying to understand why I'm still a ladies' man and not yet settled down. I would say that's a question that's asked throughout. I would say it's an answer that's explained throughout, too. Not for the world, but for myself and for men and women in the situations I've been in. Like I've said, I like to make my music the soundtrack of my life, as well as the possibility to be the soundtrack for other people's lives. So, I just want people to get an understanding of where I am mentally and what I think about sometimes.

== Music and lyrics ==
"Playboy"
A sample of "Playboy", featuring Songz's lyrics about his internal conflict.

Tremaine is an R&B album, with a consistent mid-tempo groove, about the toughness of changing a playboy lifestyle to a romantic one, showing vulnerable moments where he desires to prove himself to his loved one, as well as introspections about how he personally feels unsatisfied not expressing his genuine love for another because of his Casanova image, also having "hyper-libidinous" tracks where he celebrates the beautiness of sexual temptation.

The album opens up with the lines "I been stressed out / I ain't feeling my best / All they want is my sex", setting the theme for the album. On the "90's inspired" slow-jam "Playboy", he laments his inability to change, singing "Don't know why I'm still kissing girls that I don't love / still stumbling out of these clubs / still I'm just so hard to trust / don't know why I'm still a playboy". On tracks like "Nobody Else but You", "Come Over" and "Priceless" he approaches his loved one as a changed man, stating that all he wants and needs is her love. On "Animal" and "She Lovin It" he finds himself really enjoying himself during wild one-night stands. The album also contains painful breakup songs, suggesting the in and out situation with his former girlfriend caused by his way of living his sexuality, including the alternative R&B record "Song Goes Off", and the album's final track "Break from Love", a piano ballad where he yearns "I don't want to break from us / After all we've been through so much / I don't want to break from love".

== Critical reception ==
Professional ratings
Review scores
Source	Rating
AllMusic	3/5 stars
Revolt	4.5/5 stars
Vibe	4/5 stars
USA Today	3/5 stars
Exclaim!	4/10

Upon its release, the album received generally positive reviews from contemporary music critics. Andy Kellman of AllMusic praised its vocal performance stating "as vocalist of such considerable caliber [...] [t]here's no disproving that Songz is still in his element" but found its production to be "too flat and usual at times". Revolt's Maurita Salkey was complimentary of the album, saying "Trey's three-year hiatus seems to have paid off. This album leaves you with an array of emotions, but most importantly leaves you yearning for more." John Kennedy of Vibe praised its lyrical content, stating that it shows "a softer side of the guy who invented sex", ending up his review by saying that "Trigga and Tremaine [are] pop culture's great dualities [that distinct] the two sides of Trey Songz". Maeve McDermott of USA Today commended the "better man" promise songs like "Nobody Else but You", "Playboy" and "Priceless", but was dismissive of the lyrical production on songs like "1x1" and "#1 Fan", affirming "he's trying too hard to prove his changing to still betray hints of his toxic masculinity along the way". Kyle Mullin of Exclaim! said that "If only Songz had filled out Tremaine the Album with such stronger fare, it would be an LP worthy of bearing his name."

== Commercial performance ==
Tremaine debuted at number three on the US Billboard 200 behind Drake's More Life and Ed Sheeran's ÷ with 67,000 album-equivalent units, which included 45,000 pure album sales in its first week. It serves as Trey Songz's fifth consecutive top three album in the United States. On September 17, 2019, The album was certified gold by the Recording Industry Association of America for combined sales and album-equivalent units of over 500,000 units in the United States.

== Track listing ==
Credits adapted from Tidal.

No.	Title	Writer(s)	Producer(s)	Length
1.	"The Prelude"	Tremaine Neverson; Troy Taylor; John McGee; Sean Momberger; Paul Momberger	$K; Xeryus G	1:47
2.	"Come Over"	T. Neverson; Taylor	Composer; Taylor; Cail	4:02
3.	"#1 Fan"	T. Neverson; Dwayne Nesmith	Rico Love; Earl & E; D-Town	3:57
4.	"Nobody Else but You"	T. Neverson	Isaak	3:48
5.	"Playboy"	T. Neverson	Rico Love; Earl & E	4:16
6.	"The Sheets... Still"	T. Neverson	$K; Xeryus G.	6:04
7.	"Song Goes Off"	T. Neverson; Prince Charlez; Frank Brim; David Brown	C4	4:04
8.	"She Lovin It"	T. Neverson; Ester Dean; Jeff Gitelman	Cook Classics; Gitty; Osta	3:09
9.	"Animal"	T. Neverson	Dr. Luke; MADE IN CHINA; Osta; Cirkut; JMIKE	4:21
10.	"1x1"	T. Neverson; Neal Conway; Nate Cyphert; John Mitchell; Crystal Waters	Sermstyle; Pip Kembo	3:23
11.	"Priceless"	T. Neverson; Theron Thomas; Lukasz Gottwald	Dr. Luke; MADE IN CHINA; Cirkut; JMIKE; Ogren	3:55
12.	"What Are We Here For"	T. Neverson; Jason Boyd	Sons of Sonix; Poo Bear	3:16
13.	"Games We Play" (featuring MIKExANGEL)	T. Neverson; Patrick Hayes; Tenisha Younger	Guitar Boy	4:23
14.	"Picture Perfect"	T. Neverson; Alex Neverson; Micah Powell	Cardiak; A-Wall	4:07
15.	"Break from Love"	T. Neverson	Snyder; Poo Bear	3:48
Total length:				58:20

Notes

- ^{^{^[a]}} signifies a co-producer
- ^{^{^[b]}} signifies an additional producer

== Charts ==
=== Weekly charts ===
Chart (2017)	Peak position
Australian Albums (ARIA)	24
Belgian Albums (Ultratop Flanders)	87
Belgian Albums (Ultratop Wallonia)	110
Canadian Albums (Billboard)	38
Dutch Albums (Album Top 100)	25
French Albums (SNEP)	104
New Zealand Albums (RMNZ)	39
Swiss Albums (Schweizer Hitparade)	83
UK Albums (Official Charts)	40
US Billboard 200	3
US Top R&B/Hip-Hop Albums (Billboard)	2

=== Year-end charts ===
Chart (2017)	Position
US Billboard 200	167
US Top R&B/Hip-Hop Albums (Billboard)	61

== Certifications ==
Region	Certification	Certified units/sales
United States (RIAA)	Gold	500,000^{‡}
^{‡} Sales+streaming figures based on certification alone.
