= Foreign (song) =

Single by Trey Songz (original) featuring Justin Bieber (remix)

from the album Trigga
- Released: May 13, 2014 (original); July 1, 2014 (remix)
- Recorded: 2013 (original); May 14, 2014 (remix)
- Genre: Pop-rap
- Length: 4:08 (original); 4:34 (remix)
- Label: Songbook; Atlantic
- Songwriters: Tremaine Neverson; Keneth Coby; The Insomniakz
- Producers: Soundz; The Insomniaks

Trey Songz singles chronology
"SmartPhones" (2014)	"Foreign" (2014)	"Change Your Mind" (2014)

Justin Bieber singles chronology
"Looking for You" (2014)	"Foreign" (Remix) (2014)	"Home to Mama" (2014)

Visualizer video
- "Foreign" on YouTube

"Foreign" is a song by American singer Trey Songz, released on May 13, 2014. The song serves as the third single from his sixth studio album, Trigga which was released on July 1, 2014. American record producers Soundz and "The Insomniaks" co-produced the track.

== Remix ==
The official remix is part of the standard track list and features Canadian artist Justin Bieber.

== Charts ==
=== Weekly charts ===
Weekly chart performance for "Foreign"
Chart (2014)	Peak position
Belgium (Ultratip Bubbling Under Flanders)	69
Belgium Urban (Ultratop Flanders)	35
France (SNEP)	155
US Billboard Hot 100	84
US Hot R&B/Hip-Hop Songs (Billboard)	25
US Rhythmic Airplay (Billboard)	25

Weekly chart performance for "Foreign (Justin Bieber remix)"
Chart (2014)	Peak position
UK Hip Hop/R&B (Official Charts)	37

=== Year-end charts ===
Chart (2014)	Position
US Hot R&B/Hip-Hop Songs (Billboard)	68
