= Slow Motion (Trey Songz song) =

Single by Trey Songz

from the album Trigga Reloaded
- Released: January 20, 2015
- Recorded: 2014
- Genre: R&B
- Length: 3:17
- Label: Songbook; Atlantic
- Songwriters: Tremaine Neverson; Charlie Puth; Geoffrey Earley; Jacob Kasher Hindlin
- Producers: Charlie Puth; Geoffro Cause

Trey Songz singles chronology
| "Lonely" (2014) | "Slow Motion" (2015) | "About You" (2015) |

"Slow Motion" is a song by American singer Trey Songz. It was released through Songbook Entertainment and Atlantic Records on January 20, 2015, as the lead single from the reissue of Songz's sixth studio album, Trigga (2014), titled Trigga Reloaded (2015). It reached number 26 on the US Billboard Hot 100.

== Music video ==
A music video for the popular song directed by Dre Films was released on February 14, 2015. It features his longtime girlfriend and model Tanaya Henry and compares to Usher's "Dive". In the beginning of the music video, Trey picks Tanaya up, his love interest, and heads to the club, but changes his mind and decides to take her back to his house instead. In no time, he removes her article of clothing, pours her a drink and make out by the fireplace and on the balcony. Toward the end of the video, Trey takes off his shirt, while his model co-star and love interest Tanaya Henry is chilling and smoking a joint and start make love.

== Charts ==
=== Weekly charts ===
| Chart (2015) | Peak position |
|---|---|
| US Billboard Hot 100 | 26 |
| US Hot R&B/Hip-Hop Songs (Billboard) | 9 |
| US R&B/Hip-Hop Airplay (Billboard) | 2 |
| US Adult R&B Songs (Billboard) | 22 |
| US Rhythmic Airplay (Billboard) | 8 |

=== Year-end charts ===
| Chart (2015) | Position |
|---|---|
| US Billboard Hot 100 | 64 |
| US Rhythmic (Billboard) | 38 |

== Certifications ==
| Region | Certification | Certified units/sales |
|---|---|---|
| Denmark (IFPI Danmark) | Gold | 45,000^{‡} |
| United Kingdom (BPI) | Gold | 400,000^{‡} |
| United States (RIAA) | 3× Platinum | 3,000,000^{‡} |
^{‡} Sales+streaming figures based on certification alone.
