= Trigga (album) =

Album by Trey Songz

Studio album by Trey Songz
- Released: July 1, 2014
- Recorded: 2012–2014
- Genres: R&B; hip hop
- Length: 54:38
- Labels: Songbook; Atlantic
- Producers: Alvin Isaacs; A-Wall; Brandon "B.A.M." Alexander; Bryan "Composer" Nelson; Christopher "C4" Umana; D'Mile; Da Internz; Some Randoms; DJ Mustard; Dun Deal; Soundz; John "SK" McGee; Mike Will Made It; Troy Taylor; The Breed; The Featherstones; The Insomniakz; BongoByTheWay

Trey Songz chronology
Chapter V (2012)	Trigga (2014)	Intermission I & II (2015)

Singles from Trigga
- 1. "Na Na" Released: January 21, 2014; 2. "SmartPhones" Released: April 1, 2014; 3. "Foreign" Released: May 13, 2014; 4. "Change Your Mind" Released: May 13, 2014; 5. "What's Best for You" Released: June 2, 2014; 6. "Touchin, Lovin" Released: September 9, 2014

Trigga is the sixth studio album by American singer Trey Songz. It was released on July 1, 2014, by Songbook and Atlantic Records. The album serves as the follow-up to the singer's fifth studio album Chapter V (2012). Trey Songz enlisted a variety of record producers such as DJ Mustard, Mike Will Made It, Da Internz, Soundz, Dun Deal, The Featherstones, D'Mile and The Insomniakz, among others.

Musically, Trigga is a hip hop-influenced R&B album that focuses on themes of promiscuity and infidelity. The album was met with positive reviews from critics, who praised Trigga's musicality and brazenness. The album fared well commercially, debuting at number one on the US Billboard 200. The album was supported by six official singles: "Na Na", "SmartPhones", "Foreign", "Change Your Mind", "What's Best for You", and "Touchin, Lovin" featuring Nicki Minaj. Trigga has been available in a repackaged version, titled Trigga Reloaded, as of June 2015.

== Background ==
On February 15, 2014, Trey Songz announced that the title to his sixth studio album would be called Trigga and announced it would be released on June 30, 2014. Talking about the album the singer said: "My album is very unapologetic, but at the same time, it's real. And when I do speak about love, you feel the emotion there, whether I'm joyous about it or not, it's still emotion. And I think that's what music is, is emotion". When asked about Trigga's lyrical content being different from the average R&B album in regards to love, he stated:

The thing about being an R&B singer is, people want you to be in love, people want you to sing about love, and of course we need more songs about love. But that ain't my truth right now. I'm not in love. I don't have a girlfriend; I ain't even really looking for one right now, you know? That's definitely showcased in the music.

== Music and lyrics ==
Trigga is a hip hop-influenced R&B album. According to Iyana Robertson of Vibe, the album finds the singer "in the most brash musical space of his career". Andy Kellman of AllMusic said that the persona portrayed by Songz on Trigga "relishes his playboy status more than ever, boasting about a multitude of behavioral stunts". Spin's reviewer Anupa Mistry said that the album succeeded into representing sonically and lyrically the merge of R&B and hip hop that was happening during that period, that was carried by other artists such as Chris Brown and Drake.

== Singles ==
On January 21, 2014, Songz released a song, titled "Na Na" as the album's first official single. The music video for "Na Na" was released on March 12. The song peaked at number 21 on the US Billboard's Hot 100.

On April 1, 2014, Songz released a song, called "SmartPhones" as the album's second official single. The music video for "SmartPhones" was released on May 10.

"Foreign" and "Change Your Mind" were released as the album's third and fourth singles respectively on May 13, 2014. The music video for "Foreign" was released on June 16. The music video for "Change Your Mind" was released on June 24.

"What's Best for You" was released as the album's fifth single on June 2, 2014. On August 19, 2014, the music video was released for "What's Best For You". The song peaked at number one on the Billboard's Adult R&B Songs, number 21 on the Billboard's R&B/Hip-Hop Airplay, and number 20 on the Billboard's Hot R&B Songs charts.

"Touchin, Lovin", featuring Nicki Minaj, was sent to US urban radio as the album's sixth single on September 9, 2014. On January 5, 2015, the music video was released for "Touchin Lovin" featuring Nicki Minaj.

"Ordinary", featuring Jeezy, was previously released as a promo-only single on April 22, 2014, but did not appear on the album.

== Critical reception ==
Professional ratings
Aggregate scores
Source	Rating
Metacritic	68/100
Review scores
Source	Rating
AllMusic	4.5/5 stars
The Guardian	3/5 stars
HipHopDX	4/5
Now	3/5
Slant Magazine	2/5 stars
Spin	8/10
USA Today	3/4 stars
XXL	3/5 (L)

Trigga was met with positive reviews from music critics. At Metacritic, which assigns a normalized rating out of 100 to reviews from critics, the album received an average score of 68, which indicates "generally positive reviews", based on 9 reviews. Andy Kellman of AllMusic said, "This is, no doubt, one of the most flagrantly lecherous commercial R&B albums of its time. It also has sharp hooks and slick productions to spare." Anupa Mistry of Spin stated, "Trigga ... [is] a sublime, soulful convergence of the sonic minimalism and oil-slicked synths of today's hip-hop and R&B (courtesy, mostly, of Young Thug and Migos-famous producer Dun Deal), and its sound provides a charismatic contrast to its almost anhedonic pursuit of pleasure." Paul MacInnes of The Guardian said, "It might all feel a little mechanical, but Trigga does hang together, and has a seductive power that (one presumes) is befitting of the man himself." Matt Fruchtman of Slant Magazine stated, "At times, Songz's lyrics venture into personal territory: "Y.A.S. (You Ain't Shit)" displays both genuine self-loathing and anger that's a stark contrast to the arrogant persona featured throughout the bulk of the album. This kind of vulnerability is refreshing, but Trigga is otherwise designed like a Hollywood blockbuster: squandered talent, obvious themes, and fleeting moments of creative excellence that stick among the clichés."

Martín Caballero of USA Today said, "Trey Songz's engaging sixth album, Trigga, is a statement of intent — not of a bold new direction, but rather of the singer's determination to solidify the hitmaker's pedigree he's worked hard to earn." Julia LeConte of Now stated, "Trigga is smooth and singable, with its share of gems. "Change Your Mind" is the most initially catchy (in that vanilla, Jason Derülo way) and "Foreign (Remix)" begs for repeat spins." Erin Lowers of XXL said, "Filled with lust, desire and sexual journeys, Trey Songz reaches an expected level of mainstream success with Trigga, and while safe is always encouraged during sexual acts, perhaps Trey could've taken a few more risks with this album." Marcus Dowling of HipHopDX found his vocal performance on the record "irrepressibly pleasing", stating that "his delivery makes the simplistic and direct tone of his songwriting stand out".

== Commercial performance ==
The album debuted at number one on the Billboard 200, with first-week sales of 105,000 copies in the United States. The album spent an additional two weeks in the chart's top ten. As of October 2014, the album had sold 264,000 copies. The release of Trigga Reloaded prompted the album's return to the album chart at number 23 for the week of July 11, 2015 with 17,000 equivalent album units; it sold 8,000 copies that week, with the remainder of its unit total reflecting the album's streaming activity and track sales. The album made its chart debut in the United Kingdom where it debuted at number seventeen on the UK Albums Chart and number one on the UK R&B Albums Chart. In July 2016, the album was certified platinum for combined sales and streaming equivalent units of over a million units in the United States.

In 2014, Trigga was ranked as the 58th most popular album of the year on the Billboard 200.

== Track listing ==
Trigga – Standard version
No.	Title	Writer(s)	Producer(s)	Length
1.	"Cake"	Tremaine Neverson; David Cunningham; Samuel Jean	Dun Deal	4:45
2.	"Foreign"	Neverson; Kenneth Coby; Josh Gilmore; David Wojciechowski; Michael Sinocchi; Robert Wojciechowski	Soundz; The Insomniakz	4:08
3.	"Na Na"	Neverson; Jean; Dijon McFarlane; Mikely Adam; Mary Brocket; Allen McGrier	DJ Mustard; Mike Free	3:51
4.	"Touchin, Lovin" (featuring Nicki Minaj)	Neverson; Onika Maraj; Frank Brim; Kevin Ross; William Feathersone; Justine Feathersone; Christopher Feathersone; Matthew Feathersone; Sean Combs; Daron Jones; Robert Kelly; Christopher Wallace	The Featherstones	3:42
5.	"Disrespectful" (featuring Mila J)	Neverson; Jamila Chilombo; Eric Bellinger; Dernst Emile II	D'Mile	3:56
6.	"Dead Wrong" (featuring Ty Dolla Sign)	Neverson; Tyrone Griffin, Jr.; Ross; Brim; W. Feathersone; J. Feathersone; C. Feathersone; M. Feathersone; Nick Seeley	The Featherstones	3:47
7.	"All We Do"	Neverson; Teyonie Harts; Davion Farris; John McGee; Floyd Bentley; Elese Russell	$K	4:27
8.	"Foreign (Remix)" (featuring Justin Bieber)	Neverson; Justin Bieber; Coby; D. Wojciechowski; Sinocchi; R. Wojciechowski; Gilmore	Soundz; The Insomniakz	4:33
9.	"Late Night" (featuring Juicy J)	Neverson; Jordan Houston; Michael Williams II; Asheton Hogan; Jean	Mike Will Made It; A+	5:08
10.	"SmartPhones"	Neverson; Jean; Bryan Nelson; Alvin Isaacs; Sam Cook	Composer; Isaacs	3:52
11.	"Yes, No, Maybe"	Neverson; Alex Neverson; Forest Tucker; Jean	Some Randoms	5:18
12.	"Y.A.S. (You Ain't Shit)"	Neverson; Jean; Christopher "C4" Umana; Uforo Ebong	L&F	6:05
13.	"Change Your Mind"	Neverson; James Abrahart; Marcos Palacios; Ernest Clark; Alexander Izquierdo; Mark Goodchild	Da Internz	3:42

Trigga – Deluxe version (Trigga bonus tracks)
No.	Title	Writer(s)	Producer(s)	Length
14.	"What's Best for You"	Neverson; Brandon Hodge; Edrick Miles; Ezekiel Lewis; Troy Taylor	Taylor; B. A. M.	3:31
15.	"Love Around the World"	Neverson; Palacios; Clark	Da Internz	3:33
16.	"I Know (Can't Get Back)"	Neverson; McGee	$K, Bertell, Kevin Ross	4:15
17.	"Mr. Steal Your Girl"	Neverson	SquatBeats; Virtuoso	4:35

Trigga – Target bonus tracks (disc two)
No.	Title	Writer(s)	Producer(s)	Length
18.	"Hard to Walk Away"	Carrot	Some Randoms	4:09
19.	"Serial"	Neverson; Palacios; Clark	Da Internz	5:54
20.	"Sneaky"	Neverson	The Breed	4:15

== Trigga Reloaded ==
Trigga Reloaded

Studio album (reissue) by Trey Songz
- Released: June 23, 2015
- Recorded: 2014–15
- Genres: R&B; hip hop
- Length: 75:11
- Labels: Songbook; Atlantic

Trey Songz chronology
Intermission I & II (2015)	Trigga Reloaded (2015)	Tremaine (2017)

Singles from Trigga Reloaded
- 1. "Slow Motion" Released: January 20, 2015; 2. "About You" Released: May 18, 2015

Trigga Reloaded is the reissue of American singer and songwriter Trey Songz' sixth studio album, Trigga. It was released on June 23, 2015, by Songbook and Atlantic Records. Released eleven months after the original, Trigga Reloaded features four newly recorded songs.

Preceding the reissue's release was the lead single, "Slow Motion"; which reached number 26 on the US Billboard Hot 100. To push the album further, Songz performed and appeared at several high-profile events across the United States. The second single, "About You"; was then released on May 18, 2015. During the following week of the re-release, Trigga rose to number 23 on the US Billboard 200, selling 17,000 copies.

== Background ==
Shortly after releasing Trigga, the singer continued to create music that he felt maintained the "vibe" of his previous work. Rather than developing a completely new project, he aimed to "incorporate it into the experience" of the Trigga album. This led to the release of an updated version titled Trigga Reloaded.

Songz announced the reissue's release in February 2015 with an Instagram post.

== Singles ==
The lead single from the reissued album, "Slow Motion" was released on January 20, 2015. The production on the song was handled by Charlie Puth and Geoffro Cause. The song has reached at number 26 on the US Billboard Hot 100.

The second single from the reissued album, "About You" was released on May 18, 2015. It was written and produced by Mark Nilan Jr., alongside the productions to this song by 21 Music.

== Track listing ==
Standard edition
No.	Title	Writer(s)	Producer(s)	Length
1.	"About You"	Tremaine Neverson; Ester Dean; Brandon Green; Jeff Vaughn; Mark Nilan, Jr.; Liam Fudge; Carly Simon	Maejor; Nilan, Jr.; 21 Music; Trionomics	3:16
2.	"Slow Motion"	Neverson; Charlie Puth; Geoff Earley; Jacob Kasher	Puth; Geoffro Cause	3:17
3.	"Cake"	Neverson; David Cunningham; Samuel Jean	Dun Deal	4:45
4.	"Serve It Up"	Neverson; Alex Schwarz; Joseph Khajadourian; Puth	The Futuristics; Puth	3:47
5.	"Foreign"	Neverson; Kenneth Coby; Josh Gilmore; David Wojciechowski; Michael Sinocchi; Robert Wojciechowski	Soundz; The Insomniakz	4:09
6.	"Na Na"	Neverson; Dijon McFarlane; Mikely Adam; Jean; Teena Marie; Allen McGrier	DJ Mustard	3:51
7.	"Loving You" (featuring Ty Dolla $ign)	Neverson; Jean; Tyrone Griffin Jr.; Jonathan Larson; Al Sherrod Lambert; Nelson	Bryan "Composer" Nelson	4:06
8.	"Touchin, Lovin" (featuring Nicki Minaj)	Neverson; Kevin Ross; Frank Brim; William Feathersone; Justine Feathersone; Christopher Feathersone; Matthew Feathersone; Onika Maraj; Sean Combs; Daron Jones; Robert Kelly; Christopher Wallace	The Featherstones	3:41
9.	"Disrespectful" (featuring Mila J)	Neverson; Dernst Emile II; Eric Bellinger	D'Mile	3:56
10.	"Dead Wrong" (featuring Ty Dolla $ign)	Neverson; Ross; Brim; W. Feathersone; J. Feathersone; C. Feathersone; M. Feathersone; Nick Seeley; Griffin, Jr.	The Featherstones	3:47
11.	"All We Do"	Neverson; John McGee; Davin Farris; Elese Russell	McGee	4:27
12.	"Foreign (Remix)" (featuring Justin Bieber)	Neverson; Coby; Gilmore; Justin Bieber; D. Wojciechowski; Sinocchi; R. Wojciechowski	Soundz; The Insomniakz	4:33
13.	"Late Night" (featuring Juicy J)	Neverson; Michael Williams; Jordan Houston; Asheton Hogan; Jean	Mike WiLL Made It; A+	5:08
14.	"SmartPhones"	Neverson; Nelson; Alvin Isaacs; Sam Cook	Nelson; Isaacs	3:52
15.	"Yes, No, Maybe"	Neverson; Alex Neverson; Forest Tucker; Jean	Some Randoms	5:18
16.	"Y.A.S. (You Ain't Shit)"	Neverson; Christopher Umana; Uforo Ebong	C4; Bongo The Drum Gahd	6:05
17.	"Change Your Mind"	Neverson; Marcos Palacios; Ernest Clark; James Abrahart; Alexander Iquierdo; Mark Goodchild	Da Internz	3:42
18.	"What's Best for You"	Neverson; Troy Taylor; Ross; Brandon Hodge; Edrick Miles; Ezekiel Lewis	Taylor; B.A.M.	3:31
Total length:				75:11

== Charts ==
=== Weekly charts ===
Chart (2014)	Peak position
Australian Albums (ARIA)	21
Belgian Albums (Ultratop Flanders)	93
Belgian Albums (Ultratop Wallonia)	101
Canadian Albums (Billboard)	20
Danish Albums (Hitlisten)	32
Dutch Albums (Album Top 100)	23
French Albums (SNEP)	46
German Albums (Offizielle Top 100)	43
Scottish Albums (Official Charts)	75
Swiss Albums (Schweizer Hitparade)	25
UK Albums (Official Charts)	17
UK R&B Albums (Official Charts)	1
US Billboard 200	1
US Top R&B/Hip-Hop Albums (Billboard)	1

=== Year-end charts ===
Chart (2014)	Position
US Billboard 200	58
US Top R&B/Hip-Hop Albums (Billboard)	13

Chart (2015)	Position
US Billboard 200	90
US Top R&B/Hip-Hop Albums (Billboard)	36

== Certifications ==
Region	Certification	Certified units/sales
Denmark (IFPI Danmark)	Gold	10,000^{‡}
New Zealand (RMNZ)	Platinum	15,000^{‡}
United Kingdom (BPI)	Silver	60,000^{‡}
United States (RIAA)	Platinum	1,000,000^{^}
^{^} Shipments figures based on certification alone.^{‡} Sales+streaming figures based on certification alone.

== See also ==
- List of Billboard 200 number-one albums of 2014
