= Can't Help but Wait =

"Can't Help But Wait"

Single by Trey Songz

from the album Trey Day
- Released: August 6, 2007
- Recorded: 2007
- Genre: R&B
- Length: 3:27
- Label: Atlantic
- Songwriters: Johntá Austin; Mikkel S. Eriksen; Tor Erik Hermansen
- Producer: Stargate

Trey Songz singles chronology
"Wonder Woman" (2007)	"Can't Help But Wait" (2007)	"Last Time" (2008)

"Can't Help but Wait" is the second single from the Trey Songz album Trey Day. The song is written by Johntá Austin, Mikkel S. Eriksen, and Tor Erik Hermansen. On the issue date of October 6, 2007, the single debuted on the US Billboard Hot 100 at number 99. Canadian actress Rosemary De Los Santos appears in the video as the girlfriend and American actor Jackie Long (ATL) appears in the video as the abusive boyfriend. "Can't Help but Wait" peaked within the top 20 of the US Billboard Hot 100, at number 14 the week ending December 22, 2007. The video was filmed in Toronto, Ontario. The song was nominated for Best Male R&B Vocal Performance at the 2009 Grammy Awards.

== Background and composition ==
"Can't Help But Wait"
A mid-tempo number, the song speaks of an abusive relationship.

The duo of producers Stargate originally created the song's instrumental for a song titled "If", made for Beyoncé's 2006 album B'Day, with lyrics written by Ne-Yo. Uploads of Ne-Yo's "If" demo can be found on YouTube.

"Can't Help But Wait" was fully written by Johntá Austin. The song was sent for United States rhythmic contemporary airplay on August 7, 2007 by Songbook and Atlantic Records. Elsewhere, "Can't Help But Wait" was released as a one-track digital download by WEA International on August 28, 2007. Additionally, Atlantic Records released a CD single on March 17, 2008 in the United Kingdom.

According to the sheet music published by Sony/ATV Music Publishing, "Can't Help But Wait" is an R&B song set in common time with a moderate R&B tempo of 95 beats per minute. It is written in the key of G minor, and follows the chord progression of E♭maj_{7}–Cm_{9}–Gm_{9}–Gm, and Songz' voice in the song spans from F_{4} to G_{5}. "Can't Help But Wait" is about Songz wanting a woman who is mistreated by her boyfriend; he attempts to persuade the woman to leave her partner and gives examples of how women can be treated courteously. Lil Wayne and Plies have each remixed "Can't Help But Wait", with the latter's remix being featured on the soundtrack album for the 2008 film Step Up 2: The Streets.

== Critical reception ==
"Can't Help But Wait" was selected as one of Trey Day's best tracks in Allmusic's review of the album. A reviewer for Billboard lauded the songwriting and production of the number, and praised the maturity that Songz showed on the tune. Writing for About.com Mark Edward Nero commended Songz' vocal effort on "Can't Help But Wait", and the song's "nice balance of sensitivity and swagger". It was ranked at number twenty-three on MTV News' list of the 27 Essential R&B Songs of 2007. "Can't Help But Wait" was nominated in the Best Male R&B Vocal Performance category at the 2009 Grammy Awards, but lost to Ne-Yo's "Miss Independent".

== Chart performance ==
"Can't Help But Wait" entered the US Hot R&B/Hip-Hop Songs at number seventy-two on the chart of August 25, 2007. On December 15, 2007 it reached its peak position of number two, where it remained the following week. During both weeks "Can't Help But Wait" was at number two, Alicia Keys' "No One" topped the chart. "Can't Help But Wait" remained on the R&B/Hip-Hop Songs for thirty-two weeks. The song debuted at number ninety-nine on the Billboard Hot 100 on the issue dated October 6, 2007. "Can't Help But Wait" rose to number fourteen on the Hot 100 on December 22, 2007. achieved during its second week at number two on the R&B/Hip-Hop Songs. The song fell off the Hot 100 in March 2008, having spent twenty-four weeks on the chart. "Can't Help But Wait" appeared on the Pop 100 and Rhythmic Top 40, and reached numbers seventy-four and six, respectively. "Can't Help But Wait" made its debut on the UK Singles Chart at number 163 on March 29, 2008; it peaked at number 115.

== Track listing ==
CD single

1. "Can't Help But Wait"
2. "Can't Help But Wait" (instrumental)

== Charts ==
=== Weekly charts ===
Chart (2007–2008)	Peak position
UK Singles (OCC)	115
US Billboard Hot 100	14
US Hot R&B/Hip-Hop Songs (Billboard)	2
US Pop 100 (Billboard)	74
US Rhythmic Airplay (Billboard)	6

=== Year-end charts ===
Chart (2007)	Position
US Hot R&B/Hip-Hop Songs	76

Chart (2008)	Position
US Billboard Hot 100	86
US Hot R&B/Hip-Hop Songs	10
US Rhythmic Top 40	31

== Certifications ==
Region	Certification	Certified units/sales
New Zealand (RMNZ)	Platinum	30,000^{‡}
United States (RIAA)	Gold	500,000^{‡}
^{‡} Sales+streaming figures based on certification alone.

== Radio and release history ==
Country	Date	Format	Label
United States	August 7, 2007	Rhythmic contemporary airplay	Songbook; Atlantic
Australia	August 28, 2007	Digital download	WEA International
Austria	August 28, 2007	Digital download	WEA International
Belgium	August 28, 2007	Digital download	WEA International
Canada	August 28, 2007	Digital download	WEA International
Denmark	August 28, 2007	Digital download	WEA International
Finland	August 28, 2007	Digital download	WEA International
France	August 28, 2007	Digital download	WEA International
Germany	August 28, 2007	Digital download	WEA International
Ireland	August 28, 2007	Digital download	WEA International
Italy	August 28, 2007	Digital download	WEA International
Japan	August 28, 2007	Digital download	WEA International
Netherlands	August 28, 2007	Digital download	WEA International
New Zealand	August 28, 2007	Digital download	WEA International
Norway	August 28, 2007	Digital download	WEA International
Mexico	August 28, 2007	Digital download	WEA International
Portugal	August 28, 2007	Digital download	WEA International
Spain	August 28, 2007	Digital download	WEA International
Sweden	August 28, 2007	Digital download	WEA International
Switzerland	August 28, 2007	Digital download	WEA International
United Kingdom	August 28, 2007	Digital download	WEA International
United Kingdom	March 17, 2008	CD single	Atlantic
