= Na Na (song) =

Single by Trey Songz

from the album Trigga
- Released: January 21, 2014
- Recorded: 2013
- Genre: Hip-hop soul; R&B
- Length: 3:51
- Label: Songbook; Atlantic
- Songwriters: Tremaine Neverson; Allen McGrier; Dijon McFarlane; Lauryn Hill; Mary Brockert; Mikely Adam; Salaam Gibbs; Samuel Jean; Prakazrel Michel; Nel Ust Wyclef Jean
- Producers: Mustard; Mike Free

Trey Songz singles chronology
"Bounce It" (2013)	"Na Na" (2014)	"You're Mine (Eternal)" (2014)

"Na Na" is a song by American singer Trey Songz, released as an audio on December 26, 2013, then released on January 21, 2014 as the lead single from his sixth studio album, Trigga (2014) which was released on July 1, 2014. The song features production from Mustard, and the chorus interpolates Fugees' hit "Fu-Gee-La" (1996).

== Music video ==
On March 13, 2014, Trey Songz released the official music video of "Na Na", which was directed by Gil Green and features WWE Superstars The Bella Twins and model Rosa Acosta.

== Chart performance ==
"Na Na" debuted at number 91 on the US Billboard Hot 100 on the week of February 8, 2014. On the week of July 19, 2014, the single reached its peak position at number 21 on the chart. On May 2, 2019, the single was certified double platinum by the Recording Industry Association of America (RIAA) for combined sales and streaming data of over two million units in the United States.

== Track listing ==
Digital download
No.	Title	Length
1.	"Na Na"	3:51

== Charts ==
=== Weekly charts ===
Weekly chart performance for "Na Na"
Chart (2014)	Peak position
Australia (ARIA)	83
Australia Hitseekers (ARIA)	6
Australia Urban (ARIA)	12
Belgium (Ultratip Bubbling Under Flanders)	18
Belgium Urban (Ultratop Flanders)	18
Belgium (Ultratip Bubbling Under Wallonia)	2
Canada Hot 100 (Billboard)	94
France (SNEP)	21
Germany (Deutsche Black Charts)	15
Romania (Airplay 100)	1
Romania TV Airplay (Media Forest)	1
Scotland Singles (OCC)	36
UK Singles (OCC)	20
UK Hip Hop/R&B (OCC)	3
US Billboard Hot 100	21
US Hot R&B/Hip-Hop Songs (Billboard)	5
US R&B/Hip-Hop Airplay (Billboard)	9
US Latin Airplay (Billboard)	45
US Pop Airplay (Billboard)	28
US Rhythmic Airplay (Billboard)	1

=== Year-end charts ===
Year-end chart performance for "Na Na"
Chart (2014)	Position
France (SNEP)	125
Germany (Deutsche Black Charts)	200
US Billboard Hot 100	53
US Hot R&B/Hip-Hop Songs (Billboard)	16
US Rhythmic (Billboard)	7

== Certifications ==
Certifications and sales for "Na Na"
Region	Certification	Certified units/sales
Denmark (IFPI Danmark)	Gold	45,000^{‡}
New Zealand (RMNZ)	Platinum	30,000^{‡}
United Kingdom (BPI)	Gold	400,000^{‡}
United States (RIAA)	2× Platinum	2,000,000^{‡}
^{‡} Sales+streaming figures based on certification alone.

== Release history ==
Release dates for "Na Na"
Country	Date	Format	Record label
United States	January 21, 2014	CD; digital download	Songbook; Atlantic
United States	May 6, 2014	Contemporary hit radio	Songbook; Atlantic

== See also ==
- List of Airplay 100 number ones of the 2010s
