= Trey Songz =

American R&B singer (born 1984)

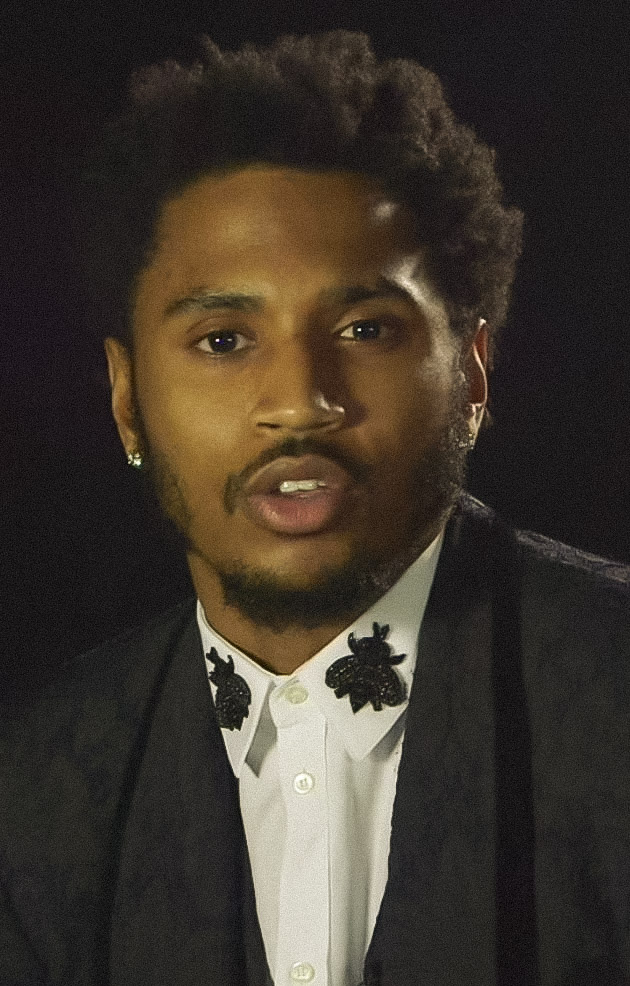
- Trey Songz in 2017

Background information
- Also known as: Trigga; Mr. Steal Yo Girl; Prince of Virginia
- Born: Tremaine Aldon Neverson; November 28, 1984 (age 41); Petersburg, Virginia, U.S.
- Genre: R&B
- Occupations: Singer; songwriter; actor
- Works: Trey Songz discography
- Years active: 2003–present
- Labels: Atlantic; Songbook
- Member of: Ocean's 7
- Children: 1
- Website: treysongz.com

Tremaine Aldon Neverson (born November 28, 1984), known professionally as Trey Songz, is an American R&B singer and songwriter. After being discovered by record producer Troy Taylor in 2003, Songz signed to his record label, Songbook Entertainment, in a joint venture with Atlantic Records during that same year. His debut album, I Gotta Make It (2005), entered at number 20 on the Billboard 200, while his second album, Trey Day (2007), peaked at number 11. The latter was supported by the single, "Can't Help but Wait", which peaked at number 14 on the Billboard Hot 100 and was nominated for Best Male R&B Vocal Performance at the 51st Annual Grammy Awards. His third album, Ready (2009), peaked at number three on the Billboard 200, spawned the Billboard Hot 100-top ten single "Say Aah" (featuring Fabolous), and was nominated for Best Contemporary R&B Album at the 52nd Annual Grammy Awards.

Neverson's fourth album, Passion, Pain & Pleasure (2010), peaked at number two on the Billboard 200 and spawned the single "Bottoms Up" (featuring Nicki Minaj), which peaked at number six on the Billboard Hot 100. Supported by the Grammy Award-nominated single "Heart Attack", his fifth album, Chapter V (2012), became his first to debut atop the Billboard 200. His sixth album, Trigga (2014), became his second to do so, and spawned a commercial re-issue following the success of his 2015 single, "Slow Motion". He has since released the albums Tremaine (2017) and Back Home (2020). Trey Songz has sold over 32 million records worldwide in singles and albums.

== Early life ==
Tremaine Aldon Neverson was born on November 28, 1984, in Petersburg, Virginia. He is the son of Claude Neverson Jr. and April (Gholson) Tucker, who was 17 when he was born. Raised as a military brat by his mother and stepfather, Neverson did not have aspirations for a musical career as a child due to his shyness, saying "Singing wasn't a reality for me, until other people started noticing I sounded good." He recognized his vocal abilities at the age of 14.

== Career ==
=== 2003–2006: Early career and I Gotta Make It ===
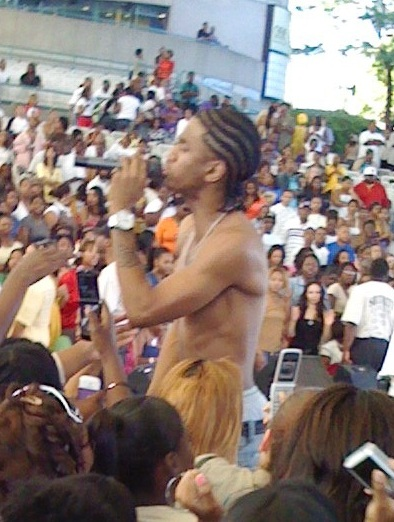
Songz performing in 2007

After graduating from Petersburg High School in 2002, Trey Songz moved to New Jersey to begin recording his debut studio album, though recording did not begin until 2003. Also in 2003, Troy Taylor signed Songz to his label, called Songbook Entertainment, which soon led to a joint venture with Atlantic Records. While recording his-then upcoming and untitled debut album in 2004, Songz released multiple mixtapes under the alias Prince of Virginia. One of his mixtapes that features an "answer track" to R. Kelly's "Trapped in the Closet", titled "Open the Closet", which granted Songz some regional attention. Songz's debut single, "Gotta Make It" (featuring Twista), released in March 2005, reached at number 87 on the Billboard Hot 100 and number 21 on the Hot R&B/Hip-Hop Songs. It garnered success in the R&B/urban community, but failed to make a mark in mainstream music. His debut studio album, I Gotta Make It was released on July 26, 2005. Upon its release, the album debuted at number 20 on the Billboard 200, selling 40,000 copies in its first week of sales. After the album had sold 300,000 records in the United States, the album's second and final single, "Gotta Go", has released in July 2005, reaching at number 67 on the Hot 100 and number 11 on the Hot R&B/Hip-Hop Songs chart, becoming even more successful than his debut single in the R&B/urban community and in the mainstream community. After promotion for his debut concluded, he was featured on the lead single from Twista's fifth album, The Day After. The single, "Girl Tonite", reached at number 14 on the Hot 100 and number 3 on the Hot R&B/Hip-Hop Songs chart, becoming a huge hit.

=== 2006–2008: Trey Day ===
In mid-2006, Songz began working on a follow-up album to his debut record with longtime collaborator Troy Taylor and also employed Bryan-Michael Cox, Danja, Stargate, and R. Kelly into helping him create the album. Trey aimed for the album to be more mainstream-oriented than his debut album. His-then upcoming and untitled second album would be preceded by the lead single, "Wonder Woman", which was released in February 2007. It reached at number 54 on the Hot R&B/Hip-Hop Songs chart, but failed to impact the Hot 100. The album was going to be released on May 8, 2007, but was continually delayed in order for a successful single to precede the album, as the lead single failed to impact charts. However, because of the single's failure, his second album was delayed from May 2007 to October 2007. The album's second single, "Can't Help but Wait", was released as a promotional single not only towards his second album, but to its soundtrack of the film, Step Up 2 the Streets, in August 2007.

His second studio album, titled Trey Day, was released on October 2, 2007. The album reached at number 11 on the Billboard 200, selling 73,000 copies in its first week. It has since sold 400,000 records in the United States, becoming his second album not to be certified by the Recording Industry Association of America (RIAA). After the album release, the single, "Can't Help but Wait", reached at number 14 on the Hot 100, and number 2 on the Hot R&B/Hip-Hop Songs chart. It became Songz's first Top 20 hit on the Hot 100, and helping the song boost his second album's first-week sales. The single was also nominated for Best Male R&B Vocal Performance at the 50th Grammy Awards. The third single from the album, "Last Time", was released in January 2008, and reached at number 69 on the Hot 100, and number 9 on the Hot R&B/Hip-Hop Songs chart. The fourth and final single from the album, "Missin' You", was released in May 2008, but failed to chart completely. In mid-2008, Songz was nominated for a BET Award for Best Male R&B Artist, but did not win the award.

=== 2008–2010: Ready ===
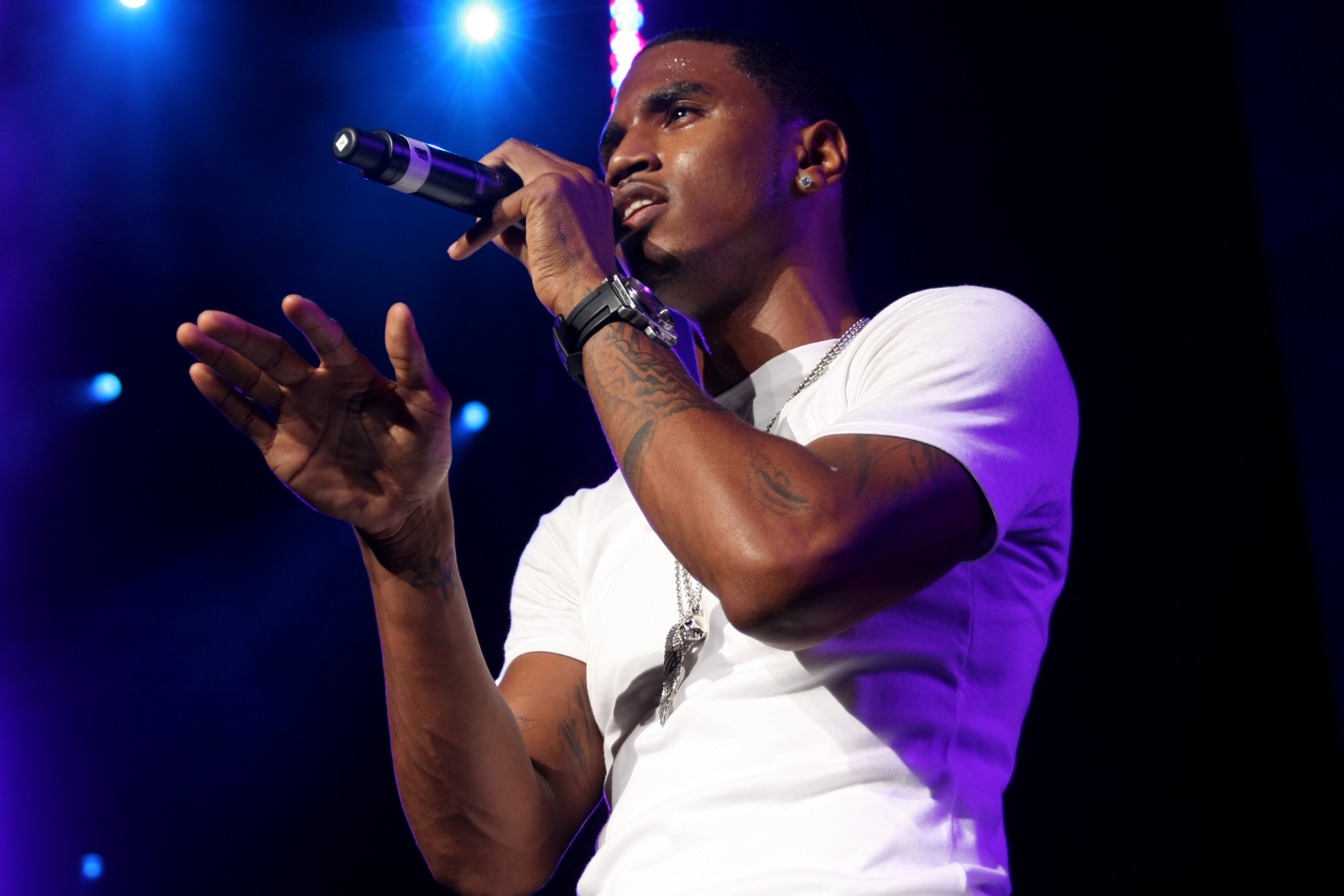
Songz performing at the Summer Jam in June 2010

In 2008, Trey began working on his-then upcoming and untitled third studio album with Bryan-Michael Cox, Sean Garrett, Stargate, and Taylor, while aiming for a more mature record than his first two full-length albums. The lead single from the album, "I Need a Girl", was released in April 2009 and reached #5 on the Hot R&B/Hip-Hop songs chart and #59 on the Hot 100, becoming an R&B/urban hit but not a mainstream hit. A promotional single, "Successful", featuring rapper Drake, was released in June 2009 and reached #17 on the Hot 100, becoming Songz's third Top 20 hit. The single also served as the second and final single from Drake's extended play (EP), So Far Gone. Before releasing his third album, Songz released a mixtape, titled Anticipation through his blog in June 2009, in which features some of these songs that would be included on his third album. Trey's other mixtape, called Genesis was released in the summer of 2009. Genesis was a collection of Trey Songz's first recordings to show his fans the dedication that he was making when he was fifteen years old. The second official single from his third album, "LOL Smiley Face" (featuring Soulja Boy and Gucci Mane), was released in August 2009, and reached at number 51 on the Hot 100, and number 12 on the Hot R&B/Hip-Hop Songs chart. On August 31, 2009, Trey released his third studio album, titled Ready. Upon its release, the album reached at number 3 on the Billboard 200, selling 131,000 copies in its first week. These are his best first-week sales to date, making the album his first record to ever reach atop of the Billboard 200. To date, the album has since sold over 1,000,000 records in the United States, earning a Platinum certification from the Recording Industry Association of America (RIAA) in June 2014, becoming his first Platinum album.

The third single from the album, "I Invented Sex" (featuring Drake), was released in October 2009, and reached at number 42 on the Hot 100, but reached at number one on the Hot R&B/Hip-Hop Songs chart, becoming his first single to top that chart. Like the first two singles from the album, it achieved success in the R&B/urban community, but only some mainstream success. Charted within the Billboard Hot 100, and topped the R&B chart. Songz was also the opening act for Jay-Z on his Jay-Z Fall Tour towards the end of 2009. The fourth single from the album, "Say Aah" (featuring Fabolous), was released in January 2010, and reached at number 9 on the Hot 100, and number 3 on the Hot R&B/Hip-Hop Songs chart. The single has become Trey's highest-charting single on the Hot 100 and one of his most successful singles on the Hot R&B/Hip-Hop Songs chart. He also collaborated with R&B singer Amerie on her song "Pretty Brown", the third single from her fourth album, In Love & War. The fifth and final single from the album, "Neighbors Know My Name", was released in February 2010, and reached at number 43 on the Hot 100 and number 4 on the Hot R&B/Hip-Hop Songs chart. The sixth single, "Yo Side of the Bed", was going to be released in June 2010, but its release was canceled for unknown reasons. The music video, featuring singer Keri Hilson, was filmed and released, however. The album was nominated for Best Contemporary R&B Album at the 52nd Grammy Awards in 2010, but lost to Beyoncé's I Am... Sasha Fierce. On April 1, 2010, he recorded an episode of MTV Unplugged, which aired on April 26, 2010. The documentary-series, Trey Songz: My Moment, which began in June 2010, received a positive reviews and high ratings. The 10-part series, which follows Trey during his time as opening act on the Jay-Z Fall Tour towards the end of 2009, ended in August 2010.

=== 2010–2012: Passion, Pain & Pleasure and Chapter V ===
In early 2010, Trey began working on the album with Sean Garrett, Troy Taylor, and Stargate, whom has stated that the album will be his most personal to date and was completed in July 2010. The album's lead single, "Bottoms Up" (featuring Nicki Minaj), was released on July 27, 2010, and reached number 6 on the Billboard Hot 100 chart, becoming his biggest hit to date. The single has since been certified 3× Platinum. "Can't Be Friends" was released as the album's second single in August 2010. Songz embarked on the Passion, Pain & Pleasure Tour on August 6, 2010, with singer Monica. The tour is his first headlining tour to date and consists of shows in venues that seat 3,000 to 5,000 people. Songz also contributed the song "Already Taken" to the Step Up 3D soundtrack, which was released on July 27, 2010. He filmed a video for the song, which was released in July 2010. The leading lady in the video is former girlfriend and professional dancer Helen Gedlu. Songz appeared at the 2010 MTV Video Music Awards on September 12, 2010. Songz's fourth studio album, Passion, Pain & Pleasure, was released on September 14, 2010. Songz also performed at the BET Awards 2011 which was broadcast on June 26, 2011.

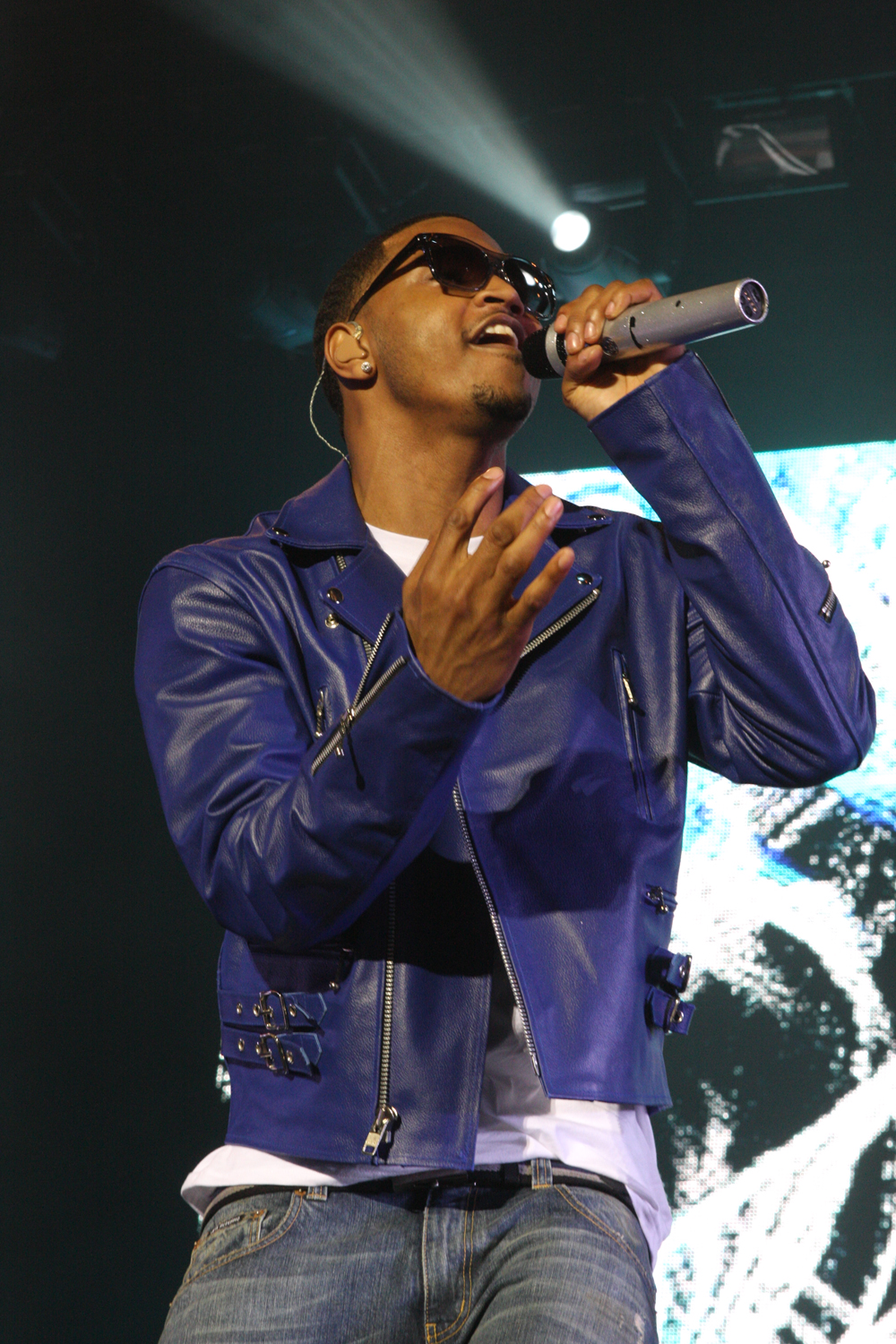
Songz performing at the Supafest in April 2012

On August 18, 2011, it was announced Songz will be working on his fifth studio album, titled Chapter V. In an interview Trey said the album, which would act as the follow-up to Passion, Pain & Pleasure, was nearing completion. He also said, "It's my sixth year in the game so I've been here for a while now. You can expect the best me you've ever heard. I don't have any release dates in mind right now but I'm just making music and enjoying myself in the studio and having fun. I have a few dream collaborations on that album that I want, but they say if you blow out your candle and make a wish you can't tell people what you ask for or it won't come true".

On November 28, 2011, his 27th birthday, Songz released his Inevitable EP to prepare for the release of his album. The EP opened with first week sales of 27,000 landing it at No. 23 on the Billboard 200 and No. 4 on Billboard's Top Hip-Hop R&B Albums chart. As of October 18, 2012, the EP has sold 91,000 copies in the United States. In February 2012, Songz will embark on his Anticipation 2our to promote his mixtape Anticipation 2 and to raise awareness of his new album. In July 2011, he was cast in Texas Chainsaw 3D as Ryan, the male lead role. The film was released on January 4, 2013.

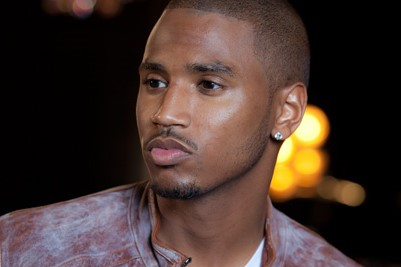
Trey Songz in 2012

Chapter V was released on August 21, 2012, by Atlantic Records, and on August 17 as a digital download. Trey Songz toured in promotion of the album on his Anticipation 2our, a tour spanning from February 9 to March 11, 2012, in North America. Rapper Big Sean was the tour's supporting act. The album debuted at number one on the US Billboard 200 chart, with first week sales of 135,000 copies. It was Songz' first album to top the chart. Chapter V was also Songz' first album to chart in the United Kingdom, where it peaked at number 10 on the UK Albums Chart. As of October 3, 2012, the album has sold 238,400 copies in the US, according to Nielsen SoundScan. The album's lead single, "Heart Attack", was released as a digital download on March 26, 2012. It charted at number 35 on the Billboard Hot 100, and number 28 on the UK Singles Chart. Its music video was released on May 4 and featured then girlfriend Kelly Rowland playing Songz' love interest. The second single "2 Reasons" was released on June 12. Its video was premiered on June 12 by BET's 106 & Park. "Simply Amazing" was released in the United Kingdom on August 12. It charted at number eight in the UK. Its music video, directed by Justin Francis, was released on July 23. "Never Again" was released as a single in the UK in November. Its music video was released on November 21.

=== 2013–2018: Trigga and Tremaine the Album ===
On June 20, 2013, in a radio interview with KS 107.5, Songz confirmed that he had already recorded about eight songs for his sixth studio album. On Christmas Day, Songz released the song titled "Na Na" on The Angel Network. In February 2014, Songz released another track featuring Young Jeezy called "Ordinary" and he was also featured on the remix to Mariah Carey's single, "You're Mine (Eternal)". In March 2014, Songz released the second single of his album called "SmartPhones". On April 1, 2014, 50 Cent released a single featuring Songz, titled "Smoke", from his fifth studio album Animal Ambition. On July 1, 2014, Trey Songz released his sixth album Trigga and it debuted at number one on the US Billboard 200 with first-week sales of 105,000 copies.

On May 18, 2015, Songz digitally released the full-length album Intermission I & II. Half of the tracks on the album were previously available on the Intermission EP, which was released on April 14, 2015. Tremaine The Album was released on March 24, 2017, three years after his last LP. This album is based on his given name, Tremaine Aldon Neverson. The LP is made up of 15 songs and the lone feature comes from fellow Virginia artist and frequent collaborator MIKExANGEL on "Games We Play."

=== 2020–present: Back Home and upcoming ninth studio album ===
On April 29, 2020, Songz released "Back Home" featuring Summer Walker. The song was produced by Hitmaka and samples Rose Royce's "I'm Going Down". On June 5, in response to the uprising following the murders of George Floyd and Breonna Taylor, Songz released "2020 Riots: How Many Times". He also released an accompanying video. On August 14, Songz released the second single "Circles", which was produced by his longtime collaborator Troy Taylor. The official video was directed by Mahaneela and is said to have been inspired by Black love. Songz' eighth album, Back Home, was released on October 9, 2020.

In 2025, Songz released seven singles, in advance of his upcoming ninth studio album, whose release date has yet to be announced.

== Personal life ==
In April 2019, Songz announced the birth of his first child, a son, with Caro Colon.

== Artistry ==
Songz possesses a tenor vocal range. His music is generally R&B and hip hop Songz's musical influences include Luther Vandross, Prince, R. Kelly, Michael Jackson, and Usher.

== Legal controversies ==
=== Assault of police officers accusations ===
In December 2016, following a performance at Joe Louis Arena in Detroit, Songz was arrested and charged with felony assault of a police officer and misdemeanor aggravated assault for injuring a photographer. It was alleged that the singer "began throwing objects after the venue cut his concert short due to an 11:30 pm curfew" and to have "struck an officer with his fist". Trey Songz pleaded guilty in August 2017 to two reduced counts of disturbing the peace, and was sentenced to 18 months of probation, substance screening and anger-management classes. In June 2018, Songz was sued in federal court for the incident that took place following the 2016 Detroit concert. A Detroit police officer alleges in the lawsuit that he suffered a "career-ending brain injury", and had to undergo a hip replacement when Songz allegedly punched him in the face. The officer alleged that after being hit, he and Songz fell to the floor, with the singer landing on top of the officer, causing him to hit his head on the concrete and also hurt his hip. A photographer working the show, also a party to the lawsuit, alleged that he sustained a head injury after Songz allegedly threw a microphone stand at him.

On January 24, 2021, Songz was arrested in Kansas City, Missouri, while attending the conference championship game between the Kansas City Chiefs and Buffalo Bills. Songz was being heckled by fans, and he asked them to "chill out". An officer came over, and from sources and a video released by TMZ, an altercation ensued. This altercation led to Songz being arrested, and charges of trespassing, resisting arrest, both misdemeanors, and for assaulting a police officer, a felony. He was released from custody the next day. Sources connected to Songz with direct knowledge told TMZ he believes the officer in question had been biased against him long before the altercation, and when the officer approached him he was immediately aggressive. Another source says the officer's issue before the incident was that Songz and his crew were not wearing masks and refused to put them on. The Kansas City Police Department released the security video from their section, which showed that the police warned Songz and his entourage several times during multiple encounters with security and police, eventually resulting in Songz being escorted out of the seating area, at which point he threw the first punch at the police officer. In November 2024, the singer has been ordered to pay the police officer more than $11 million in damages.

=== Sexual assault accusations ===
On January 22, 2017, actress/singer Keke Palmer accused Songz of secretly filming her and using the footage without her permission in the music video for his remix with Fabolous of the Travis Scott and Young Thug song “Pick Up the Phone”. She also accused him of using "sexual intimidation" while recording her, and that at one point during the alleged incident she hid from him in a closet so she would not be filmed and berated by him. Songz disputed these claims, asserting that Palmer knowingly entered a video shoot and was subsequently recorded by a cameraman. Songz denied the claims during an interview on The Breakfast Club, stating: "I did not put her in the video without her permission. I don't care that much to sneak Keke Palmer in the video for two seconds."

In 2020, a woman claimed that Songz sexually assaulted her at E11Even Miami nightclub on January 1, 2018. She later filed a lawsuit seeking damages of $10 million. The lawsuit was later dismissed.

On December 30, 2021, Dylan Gonzalez, a former member of the UNLV Lady Rebels basketball team, tweeted, "Trey Songz Is A Rapist". On January 11, 2022, she released a statement on social media accusing Songz of raping her "at a well known Las Vegas hotel". Songz later denied the accusation.

In February 2022, a third woman accused Trey Songz of rape, saying he anally raped her in March 2016. That civil suit was concluded and settled in 2024 following mediation.

In 2023, Tyrelle Dunn, a Maryland Capitol police officer, sued Songz for sexually assaulting Dunn's wife on November 28, 2021 at The Cosmopolitan in Las Vegas. Dunn's lawsuit charged battery, assault, and negligence, and negligent hiring, training, supervision and retention of Songz' security detail, who injured Dunn during a confrontation outside of Songz' residence. In October 2024, a Clark County judge awarded a $11.2 million default judgement against Songz. On January 16, 2025, the judge dismissed the judgement. In March 2025, it was reported that a jury trial for the 2021 sexual assault has been scheduled for March 16, 2026, but subsequent court records showed a confidential settlement filed in January 2026.

=== December 2025 night spot assault accusations ===
In December 2025, Trey Songz was arrested and charged with one count of felony criminal mischief and numerous misdemeanor charges involving two counts of third-degree assault, attempted assault and aggravated harassment following two different altercations which he took that month at night spots in Manhattan, with one of the incidents even resulting in $1,500 worth of damage.

== Discography ==
Studio albums

- I Gotta Make It (2005)
- Trey Day (2007)
- Ready (2009)
- Passion, Pain & Pleasure (2010)
- Chapter V (2012)
- Trigga (2014)
- Tremaine (2017)
- Back Home (2020)

== Tours ==
Headlining

- Cingular College Tour HBCUs (2005)
- Trey Day Tour (2007/08)
- Ready Tour (2009)
- Passion, Pain & Pleasure Tour (2010)
- Anticipation 2our (2012)
- Chapter V World Tour (2012)
- Between The Sheets Tour (with Chris Brown) (2015)
- Tremaine The Tour (2017)
- The Millennium Tour (2025)

Opening act

- The Blueprint 3 Tour – Jay-Z (2010)
- OMG Tour – Usher (2010)
- The Pinkprint Tour – Nicki Minaj (2015)
- The Love Hard Tour – Keyshia Cole (2024)

== Filmography ==
=== Film ===
Year	Title	Role
2008	Queen of Media	DJ I.V.
2010	Preacher's Kid	Monty
2013	Texas Chainsaw 3D	Ryan
2013	Baggage Claim	Damon Diesel
2018	Blood Brother	Sonny

=== Television ===
Year	Title	Role	Notes
2009	Lincoln Heights	Himself	Episode: "Relative Unknown"
2010	When I Was 17	Himself	Documentary
2010	Trey Songz: My Moment	Himself	Documentary
2013	Real Husbands of Hollywood	Himself	Episode: "Hollywood Scuffle"
2014	Total Divas	Himself	Episode: "The House Sitters"

== Awards and nominations ==
=== Grammy Awards ===
Year	Nominee / work	Award	Result	Ref.
2009	"Can't Help but Wait"	Best Male R&B Vocal Performance	Nominated	
2010	Ready	Best Contemporary R&B Album	Nominated	
2013	"Heart Attack"	Best R&B Song	Nominated	

=== Other awards ===
Year	Award	Category	Recipient	Result
2005	Dirty Award	Best R&B Male	Trey Songz	Nominated
2008	BET Award	Best Male R&B Artist	Trey Songz	Nominated
2008	Ozone Award	Best R&B Artist	Trey Songz	Nominated
2009	Soul Train Music Award	Best Collaboration	"Successful"	Nominated
2010	BET Award	Best Male R&B Artist	Trey Songz	Won
2010	BET Award	Best Collaboration	"Say Ahh" w/ Fabolous	Nominated
2010	BET Award	Best Collaboration	"Successful" w/ Drake	Nominated
2010	BET Award	Viewer's Choice	"Say Ahh" w/ Fabolous	Nominated
2010	MuchMusic Video Award	MuchVibe Hip-Hop Video of the Year	"Successful"	Won
2010	MOBO Award	Best International Act	Trey Songz	Nominated
2010	Teen Choice Award	Choice Music: R&B Artist	Trey Songz	Nominated
2010	American Music Award	Favorite Soul/R&B Male artist	Trey Songz	Nominated
2010	Soul Train Music Award	Best R&B/Soul Artist Male	Trey Songz	Won
2011	BET Award	Best Male R&B Artist	Trey Songz	Nominated
2011	BET Award	Coca-Cola's Viewer's Choice	"Bottom's Up"	Nominated
2011	Billboard Music Award	Top R&B Artist	Trey Songz	Nominated
2011	Billboard Music Award	Top R&B Song	"Bottoms Up"	Nominated
2011	Billboard Music Award	Top R&B Album	Passion, Pain & Pleasure	Nominated
2011	American Music Award	Favorite Soul/R&B Male artist	Trey Songz	Nominated
2011	Soul Train Music Award	Album of the Year	Passion Pain & Pleasure	Nominated
2011	Soul Train Music Award	Song of the Year	"Heart Attack"	Nominated
2012	BET Award	Best Male R&B Artist	Trey Songz	Nominated
2012	American Music Award	Favorite Soul/R&B Male artist	Trey Songz	Nominated
2012	Soul Train Music Award	Best R&B/Soul Male Artist	Trey Songz	Nominated
2012	Soul Train Music Award	Song of the Year	"Heart Attack"	Nominated
2013	Billboard Music Award	Top R&B Song	"Heart Attack"	Nominated
2013	Teen Choice Award	Choice Music R&B Artist	Trey Songz	Nominated
2013	NAACP Image Award	Outstanding Male Artist	Trey Songz	Nominated
2014	MOBO Awards	Best International Act	Trey Songz	Nominated
2014	Soul Train Music Award	Best R&B/Soul Artist Male	Trey Songz	Won
2015	Billboard Music Awards	Top R&B Artist	Trey Songz	Nominated
2015	BET Awards	Best Male R&B/Pop Artist	Trey Songz	Nominated
2017	BET Awards	Best Male R&B/Pop Artist	Trey Songz	Nominated
