= Bobby Brown discography =

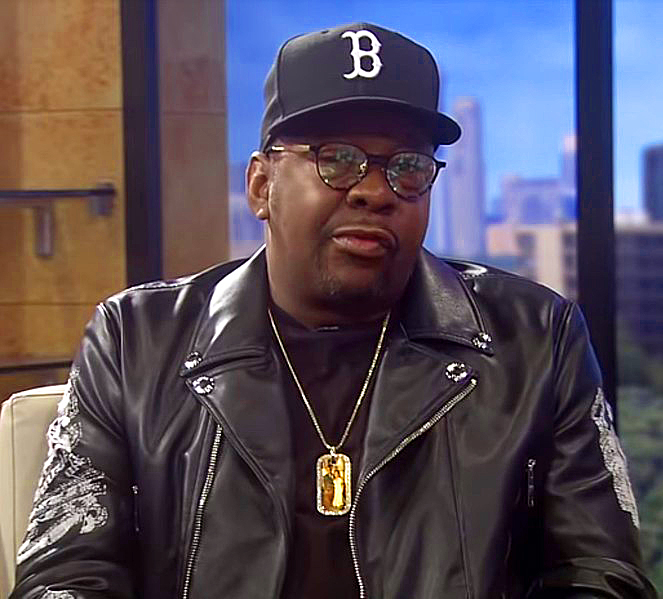
- Brown in 2018
- Studio albums: 5
- Compilation albums: 6
- Singles: 24
- Video albums: 3
- Music videos: 8

American singer Bobby Brown has released five studio albums, six compilation albums and 24 singles.

== Albums ==
=== Studio albums ===
Title	Album details	Peak chart positions										Certifications (sales thresholds)
Title	Album details	US	US R&B	AUS	AUT	CAN	GER	NED	NZ	SWE	UK	Certifications (sales thresholds)
King of Stage	Released: December 1986; Label: MCA	88	12	—	—	—	—	—	—	—	40	
Don't Be Cruel	Released: June 1988; Label: MCA	1	1	5	—	10	26	27	2	2	3	RIAA: 7× Platinum; ARIA: Platinum; BPI: 2× Platinum; MC: 3× Platinum
Bobby	Released: August 1992; Label: MCA	2	1	2	26	4	12	15	5	4	11	RIAA: 2× Platinum; ARIA: Gold; MC: Platinum
Forever	Released: November 1997; Label: MCA	61	15	105	—	—	97	—	—	—	134	
The Masterpiece	Released: June 2012; Label: Bronx Bridge	—	41	—	—	—	—	—	—	—	—	
"—" denotes releases that did not chart or were not released in that territory.

=== Compilation and remix albums ===
Title	Album details	Peak chart positions								Certifications (sales thresholds)
Title	Album details	US	US R&B	AUS	CAN	GER	NED	NZ	UK	Certifications (sales thresholds)
Dance!...Ya Know It!	Released: October 1989; Label: MCA	9	7	14	75	—	—	7	26	RIAA: Platinum; BPI: Gold; MC: Gold
Remixes in the Key of B	Released: December 1993; Label: MCA	—	72	—	—	—	—	—	—	
Hits Remixed	Released: December 1993; Label: MCA	—	—	129	—	95	—	—	—	
Two Can Play That Game	Released: August 1995; Label: MCA	—	—	161	—	—	32	—	24	
20th Century Masters: The Millennium Collection: The Best of Bobby Brown	Released: July 2005; Label: Geffen	—	—	—	—	—	—	—	—	
The Definitive Collection	Released: March 2006; Label: Geffen	—	60	—	—	—	—	—	—	
Gold	Released: March 2009; Label: Geffen	—	—	—	—	—	—	—	—	
Icon: Bobby Brown	Released: July 2013; Label: Geffen	—	72	—	—	—	—	—	—	
"—" denotes releases that did not chart or were not released in that territory.

== Singles ==
=== As lead artist ===
Year	Single	Peak chart positions										Certifications	Album
Year	Single	US	US R&B	AUS	BEL	CAN	GER	IRE	NED	NZ	UK	Certifications	Album
1986	"Girlfriend"	57	1	—	—	—	—	—	—	—	—		King of Stage
1987	"Girl Next Door"	—	31	—	—	—	—	—	—	—	179		King of Stage
1988	"Don't Be Cruel"	8	1	72	39	8	—	23	—	18	13	RIAA: Gold	Don't Be Cruel
1988	"My Prerogative"	1	1	40	10	5	15	9	7	3	6	RIAA: Gold	Don't Be Cruel
1989	"Roni"	3	2	—	—	13	—	—	—	21	21		Don't Be Cruel
1989	"Every Little Step"	3	1	8	32	12	—	10	30	5	6	RIAA: Gold; ARIA: Gold	Don't Be Cruel
1989	"On Our Own"	2	1	22	35	3	18	5	40	1	4	RIAA: Platinum; BPI: Silver	Ghostbusters II (soundtrack)
1989	"Rock Wit'cha"	7	3	57	—	14	—	13	—	17	33	RIAA: Gold	Don't Be Cruel
1990	"The Freestyle Mega-Mix"	—	—	—	—	—	—	21	—	—	14		non-album singles
1990	"Every Little Hit Mix"	—	—	21	—	—	—	—	—	3	—		non-album singles
1992	"Humpin' Around"	3	1	1	10	6	10	—	8	2	19	RIAA: Gold; ARIA: Gold	Bobby
1992	"Good Enough"	7	5	39	45	21	49	—	36	13	41	RIAA: Gold	Bobby
1993	"Get Away"	14	3	54	—	39	—	—	97	23	—		Bobby
1993	"That's the Way Love Is"	57	9	95	—	74	—	—	—	—	56		Bobby
1993	"Something in Common" (with Whitney Houston)	—	—	82	—	—	58	—	40	33	16		Bobby
1994	"Two Can Play That Game" (remix)	—	—	125	15	—	—	7	5	—	3	BPI: Platinum	Bobby/Two Can Play That Game
1995	"Humpin' Around" (remix)	—	—	—	—	—	79	26	34	—	8		Two Can Play That Game
1995	"My Prerogative" (remix)	—	—	—	—	—	—	—	—	—	17		Two Can Play That Game
1996	"Every Little Step" (remix)	—	—	—	—	—	—	—	—	—	25		Two Can Play That Game
1997	"Feelin' Inside"	—	42	109	—	—	—	—	92	—	40		Forever
2006	"Lying Eyes"	—	—	—	—	—	—	—	—	—	—		non-album single
2009	"Damaged"	—	—	—	—	—	—	—	—	—	—		The Masterpiece
2011	"Get Out the Way"	—	—	—	—	—	—	—	—	—	—		The Masterpiece
2018	"Like Bobby"	—	—	—	—	—	—	—	—	—	—		non-album single
"—" denotes releases that did not chart or were not released in that territory.

=== As featured artist ===
Year	Single	Peak chart positions										Certifications	Album
Year	Single	US	US R&B	AUS	BEL	CAN	GER	IRE	NED	NZ	UK	Certifications	Album
1990	"She Ain't Worth It" (Glenn Medeiros featuring Bobby Brown)	1	43	8	21	9	15	9	12	14	12	RIAA: Gold; ARIA: Gold	Glenn Medeiros
1991	"Stone Cold Gentleman" (Ralph Tresvant featuring Bobby Brown)	34	3	83	—	61	—	—	—	25	78		Ralph Tresvant (Ralph Tresvant album)
1991	"Voices That Care" (with Various Artists)	11	—	—	—	61	—	—	—	—	—	RIAA: Gold	Non-album single
2002	"Thug Lovin'" (with Ja Rule)	42	16	7	55	10	36	26	21	23	15	ARIA: Gold	The Last Temptation
2006	"Beautiful" (with Damian Marley)	—	—	—	—	—	—	—	86	—	39		Welcome to Jamrock
2010	"Real Love" (with Macy Gray)	—	—	—	—	—	—	—	—	—	—		The Sellout
"—" denotes releases that did not chart or were not released in that territory.

== Music videos ==
Year	Video	Director
1986	"Girlfriend"	
1987	"Girl Next Door"	
1988	"Don't Be Cruel"	
1988	"My Prerogative"	
1989	"Roni"	
1989	"Every Little Step"	
1989	"On Our Own"	
1990	"Every Little Hit-Mix" (medley)	
1990	"Rock Wit'cha"	
1990	"She Ain't Worth It"	
1991	"Voices That Care" (various artists)	David S. Jackson
1992	"Humpin' Around"	
1992	"Humpin' Around" (12" remix)	
1992	"Good Enough"	
1993	"Get Away"	
1993	"That's the Way Love Is"	
1993	"Something in Common" (duet with Whitney Houston)	
1994	"Two Can Play That Game" (K-Klass remix)	
1997	"Feelin' Inside"	
