= Mickey Garcia =

American record producer (born 1961)

- Born: October 21, 1961 (age 64); Manhattan, New York
- Occupations: Record Executive, Songwriter, Music Producer
- Years active: 1985–present
- Website: Official website

Mickey Garcia (born October 21, 1961) is an American record executive, songwriter, music producer, and DJ. He is known for founding the record label MicMac Records and for his work as a Mastermix DJ on 98.7 Kiss FM. He has written and produced over 100 songs since 1985 and is considered one of the founders of the freestyle dance genre, having produced, remixed, and written songs for artists such as Judy Torres, Cynthia, Johnny O, Tiana, Colonel Abrams and Menudo. He has been registered with the American Society of Composers, Authors and Publishers since 1987 and has over 300 works in his catalog.

== Early life ==
Garcia was born October 21, 1961, at St. Vincent's Hospital on 12th Street and 7th Avenue, lower Manhattan, to Josephina Montalvo and Michael Garcia. He grew up on Grand Street in Lower Manhattan, New York with 5 brothers and 1 sister. In 1975, Garcia and his older brother Tony began DJing together at block parties and house parties. Later, the brothers went on to DJ at various discotheques around the city.

== Career ==
In 1976, George Vascones of the Latin Symbolics dance company auditioned Garcia to DJ for a talent show. After Garcia gave Vascones a cassette tape of his mix, Vascones offered him the job to DJ for the talent show at the Stardust Ball Room in The Bronx. After the show, Vascones told Garcia about a disco in Manhattan that needed a permanent DJ because the resident DJ Jellybean Benitez was leaving to work at another disco. The Garcia DJ brothers auditioned for the owner of the discotheque "La Mariposa" in Washington Heights and got the job. In 1982, Mickey became a solo DJ and began working at The Clam Bar Lounge on Flatbush Avenue in Brooklyn. Not long after, Tony Humphries, a Mixmaster DJ for 98.7 Kiss FM, invited Garcia to mix for the station. He prepared a one-hour mix show on a reel-to-reel tape for Humphries, who liked the mix and aired the Mixshow in July 1983. Garcia went on to do several mix shows for the station.

In 1985, Garcia attended Kingsborough Community College in Brooklyn and began working at the college radio station WKRB B91 “The Rhythm Of The City” as a DJ on-air personality a few days a week. Along with reading commercials on the air and reading the news and weather, Garcia would play the format music on the program logs and would remix and multi-edit various songs that were on rotation. He would invite recording artists from the New York area who had just released new songs to be interviewed on the air. Soon after, Garcia began working with Elvin Molina, who was then known for creating music demos from his bedroom. Garcia and Molina would go on to create the hit freestyle song I won’t Stop Loving You with a local Bronx lyricist named Marilyn Rodriguez. Marilyn connected them with singer Diana Garcia, who performed under the name Diamond Eyes, who recorded vocals for the song. The demo became a huge hit with DJs in the Bronx and it caught the attention of VIP Record Pool Director Al Pizarro, who made it a hit at the club La Mirage where he was the weekend DJ. Pizarro took a cassette of I Won’t Stop Loving You to play it for a few executives at record labels. It caught the attention of Eddie O’Loughlin, president of Next Plateau Records. He was interested in signing Garcia and Molina as the next producers for the popular group C-Bank and wanted I Won’t Stop Loving You to be the next C-Bank song. The two signed the track to Next Plateau Records and it became the next C-Bank release performed by C-Bank and featuring Diamond Eyes. The song peaked at #45 on the Billboard Hot Dance Charts.

In 1986, Vascones introduced Garcia to Judy Torres. Torres auditioned for Garcia and blew him away with her powerful voice. Garcia offered her a production contract with himself and Molina, then his producing partner, and they began working on several tracks to present to Torres. Garcia reached out to Rodriguez again to write lyrics to various instrumentals on a cassette tape and the song No Reason To Cry was created. The song peaked at #30 on the Billboard Hot Dance Charts.

=== MicMac Records ===
In 1987, Garcia attended the New Music Seminar at the Marriot Marquis hotel in Times Square where he met with Prelude Records owner Marvin Schlachter. They had known each other for some time as Garcia had played many songs from Prelude Records when he was a DJ for 98.7 Kiss FM. Schlachter asked Garcia if he would be interested in producing songs for MarTru Records, a new record label he was starting. Garcia had wanted to start his own record company but didn't know how to run a label or have the capitol to invest. They decided to create a label together, with Garcia making the hits and Schlachter handling the business side of things. They got an attorney to draw up the shareholders agreement and formed the record label Micmac Records Garcia and MicMac Records have been featured in Billboard magazine, Spin magazine, DJ Times, The Face magazine, and The Village Voice.

== Personal life ==
In 1996, Garcia met Norah Alberto at the WPN 9 television station's The Richard Bey Show where she worked as a producer. In 2008, they had a daughter named Isabella Mikaella Alberto Garcia who is an American actress, artist, and musician. Garcia was baptized as one of Jehovah's Witnesses in 2017.

== Discography ==
=== Albums produced ===
Source: AllMusic

- Johnny O (MicMac Records, with Johnny O, 1989)
- Love Story (Profile Records, with Judy Torres, 1989)
- Cynthia (MicMac Records, with Cynthia, 1990)
- Tiana (MicMac Records, with Tiana, 1991)
- Like a Stranger (MicMac Records, with Johnny O, 1990)
- Cynthia II (MicMac Records, with Cynthia, 1991)
- Johnny O (The Remixes) (MicMac Records, with Johnny O, 1993) (Compilation album)
- Cynthia (The Remixes) (MicMac Records, with Cynthia, 1995) (Compilation album)

=== Charted singles produced ===
Year	Single	Artist(s)	Chart positions		
Year	Single	Artist(s)	USA	USA dance	Sales USA dance
1986	"I Won’t Stop Loving You"	C-Bank featuring Diamond Eyes	-	37	-
1987	"No Reason To Cry"	Judy Torres	-	16	46
1987	"Come Into My Arms"	Judy Torres	-	19	41
1987	"No Reason To Cry (Remix)"	Judy Torres	-	30	27
1988	"Change On Me"	Cynthia	-	37	43
1988	"Endless Nights"	Cynthia	-	-	28
1988	"Fantasy Girl"	Johnny O	-	48	-
1989	"Thief of Heart"	Cynthia	-	-	31
1989	"Memories"	Johnny O	-	37	-
1989	"Love Story"	Judy Torres	-	47	43
1990	"Dreamboy/Dreamgirl"	Cynthia & Johnny O	53	-	17

=== Selected productions and remixes ===
Year	Title	Artist(s)	Credit(s)	Label
1986	"I Won’t Stop Loving You"	C-Bank	Producer	Next Plateau Records
1987	"Take Back The Love"	Samaria	Remixer	Next Plateau Records
1987	"Perfect"	C-Bank	Producer	Next Plateau Records
1987	"Love’s Gonna Get You Tonight"	Vickie Ryan	Producer	MicMac Records
1987	"You"	Rios Sisters	Producer	MicMac Records
1987	"No Reason To Cry"	Judy Torres	Producer	Profile Records
1987	"Come Into My Arms"	Judy Torres	Producer	Profile Records
1988	"Change On Me"	Cynthia	Producer	MicMac Records
1988	"Loving You"	Solid	Producer	MicMac Records
1988	"Fantasy Girl"	Johnny O	Producer	MicMac Records
1988	"Wondering"	Tonasia	Producer, Remixer	MicMac Records
1988	"Hold Me"	Rios Sisters	Producer	MicMac Records
1988	"Listen To My Cries"	Body & Style	Producer	MicMac Records
1988	"You’ll Never Find Another Love"	& More	Engineer	MicMac Records
1988	"I’m So In Love With You"	C-Bank	Producer	Next Plateau Records
1989	"Highways Of Love"	Johnny O	Producer	MicMac Records
1989	"Are You Looking For Love"	Rios Sisters	Producer	MicMac Records
1989	"Thief Of Hearts"	Cynthia	Producer	MicMac Records
1989	"Why Did You Do It"	Exo	Producer	MicMac Records
1989	"Crying Over You"	Soave	Producer, Remixer	MicMac Records
1989	"Memories"	Johnny O	Producer	MicMac Records
1989	"In Time"	Johnny O	Producer	MicMac Records
1989	"Love You Will You Love Me"	Judy Torres	Producer	Profile Records
1989	"The Music’s Got Me"	Johnny O	Producer	MicMac Records
1989	"Love Story"	Judy Torres	Producer	Profile Records
1990	"Endless Nights"	Cynthia	Producer	MicMac Records
1990	"No More Tears"	Abby Lynn	Remixer	MicMac Records
1990	"Don’t Ever Want To Lose Your Love"	Johnny O	Producer	MicMac Records
1990	"First True Love"	Tiana	Producer	MicMac Records
1990	"Missing Part"	Judy Torres	Producer	MicMac Records
1990	"Come To Me"	Tiana	Producer	MicMac Records
1990	"I Can’t Stop Loving You"	Tiana	Producer	MicMac Records
1990	"I Will Be The One"	Tiana	Producer	MicMac Records
1990	"If I Didn’t Love You"	Tiana	Producer	MicMac Records
1990	"Let The Music Play"	Tiana	Producer	MicMac Records
1990	"Please Don’t Go"	Tiana	Producer	MicMac Records
1990	"Tell Me Why"	Tiana	Producer	MicMac Records
1990	"Without Dreams"	Tiana	Producer	MicMac Records
1990	"Bad Mamma Jamma"	Johnny O	Producer	MicMac Records
1990	"Don’t Give Up On Love"	Johnny O	Producer	MicMac Records
1990	"I Gave My Heart To You"	Johnny O	Producer	MicMac Records
1990	"I Just Wanna Get To Know You"	Johnny O	Producer	MicMac Records
1990	"Kiss & Say Goodbye"	Johnny O	Producer	MicMac Records
1990	"Like A Stranger"	Johnny O	Producer	MicMac Records
1990	"Dreamboy/Dreamgirl"	Cynthia & Johnny O	Producer	MicMac Records
1990	"Gonna Get Over You"	Cynthia	Producer	MicMac Records
1990	"Holding On"	Cynthia	Producer	MicMac Records
1990	"Best Lovers Are Best Friends"	Cynthia	Producer	MicMac Records
1991	"Break Up To Make Up"	Cynthia	Producer	MicMac Records
1991	"One Mistake"	Cynthia	Producer	MicMac Records
1991	"Pledging All My Love"	Cynthia	Producer	MicMac Records
1991	"What Will It Take"	Cynthia	Producer	MicMac Records
1991	"Don’t Go Away"	Johnny O	Producer	MicMac Records
1991	"No Regrets"	David	Producer	MicMac Records
1991	"We Can’t Go On This Way"	Johnny O	Producer	MicMac Records
1991	"I Just Wanna Get To Know You/Don’t Go Away"	Johnny O	Producer	MicMac Records
1992	"I Go Crazy"	Judy Torres	Producer	Profile Records
1992	"Dancin’ Movin’ Shakin’"	Menudo	Producer	MicMac Records
1992	"I’m The One"	Nyasia	Producer	MicMac Records
1992	"I Love You For All Seasons"	Judy Torres	Producer	Profile Records
1992	"Happy Days"	Face	Producer	MicMac Records
1992	"I Can’t Wait"	Judy Torres	Producer	Profile Records
1992	"If Your Dreams Look Like Mine"	Judy Torres	Producer	Profile Records
1992	"My Soul"	Judy Torres	Producer	Profile Records
1992	"Where Is Your Heart"	Judy Torres	Producer	Profile Records
1992	"I’m Not Gonna Cry Over You"	David	Producer	MicMac Records
1992	"Windows"	Judy Torres	Producer	Profile Records
1992	"Hold Me Kiss Me"	Judy Torres	Producer	Profile Records
1992	"You’re My Everything"	Judy Torres	Producer	Profile Records
1993	"You’re My Only Love"	Abby Lynn	Producer	MicMac Records
1993	"Everytime I Look At You"	Cynthia	Producer	MicMac Records
1993	"Cosmopolitan Girl"	Menudo	Producer	McGillis Records
1993	"Forever Missing You"	Cynthia	Producer	MicMac Records
1993	"I’m Caught Up"	Colonel Abrams	Producer	MicMac Records
1993	"Change On Me (The Remixes)"	Cynthia	Producer	MicMac Records
1993	"Love String"	Dominica	Producer	MicMac Records
1993	"Fantasy Girl (The Remixes)"	Johnny O	Producer	MicMac Records
1994	"Your Love"	David	Producer	MicMac Records
1994	"Take Me Away"	Nyasia & George Anthony	Producer	MicMac Records
1994	"Gotta Let You Go (Remix)"	Dominica	Producer	MicMac Records
1994	"Get With You"	Colonel Abrams	Producer	MicMac Records
1994	"Heal My Broken Heart"	Nyasia	Producer	MicMac Records
1994	"Do It Right"	NRG Defined	Producer	MicMac Records
1995	"Get Up"	Cipriano featuring Michell	Producer	MicMac Records
1995	"Waiting For You"	David	Producer	MicMac Records
1995	"Forever"	David	Producer	MicMac Records
1995	"This Feeling Of Love"	David	Producer	MicMac Records
1995	"Am I Gonna Be The One"	Groove Therapy	Producer	MicMac Records
1996	"Lover Boy"	Cipriano featuring Michelle	Producer	MicMac Records
1996	"Holding On"	Judy Torres	Producer	MicMac Records
1996	"Baila"	NRG Defined	Producer	MicMac Records
1996	"Can We Find A Way"	Laura Enea	Producer	MicMac Records
1996	"Reach For The Top"	Cipriano featuring Michelle	Producer	MicMac Records
1996	"I’ll Hold On"	Joel	Producer	McGillis Records
1996	"Just Begun"	Exo	Producer	MicMac Records
1997	"Lo Hacen Bien"	NRG Defined	Producer	MicMac Records
1997	"Si Lo Quieres Ven Y Cojelo"	NRG Defined	Producer	MicMac Records
1997	"Sube La Mano Si Estan Gozando"	NRG Defined	Producer	MicMac Records
1999	"Babe"	Scott Allan	Producer	Scott Allan Records
1999	"Deeper Feelings"	Scott Allan	Producer	Scott Allan Records
1999	"Gotta Love Yourself"	Scott Allan	Producer	Scott Allan Records
1999	"The Best Day Of My Life"	Scott Allan	Producer	Scott Allan Records
1999	"Something About You"	Shannon	Writer, producer	Contagious Records
2000	"Cannon"	Amadeus 2000	Producer	FullBlast Records
2000	"Now That I Found You"	Iris	Producer	Xtreme Records
2000	"Woman In Love"	Ariel	Remixer	Xtreme Records
2000	"Oompa"	Robbie Tronco	Remixer	Xtreme Records
2001	"Last Night A DJ Saved My Life"	Iris	Producer	Xtreme Records
2001	"I Need You"	LeAnn Rimes	Remixer	Curb Records
2001	"Sky High"	Marvel	Producer	Xtreme Records
2003	"Don’t Leave Me This Way"	Loleatta Holloway & Wanda Dee	Producer	Not On Label
2005	"I Wonder Why"	Stefano	Producer	MicMac Records
2005	"When Will You Love Me"	Danielle Simeone	Producer	MicMac Records
2005	"Let’s Run Away"	Iris	Producer	Xtreme Records
2005	"Something About You"	Jennifer C.	Producer	MicMac Records
2005	"Right State Of Mind"	Aby	Producer	MicMac Records
2005	"It’s Just Begun"	Exo	Producer	MicMac Records
2005	"Why Did You Deceive Me"	Ashley	Remixer	MicMac Records
2005	"Who’s Gonna Give You Love"	Nu Image	Producer	MicMac Records
2005	"Seven Days A Week"	David	Producer	MicMac Records
2005	"After All These Years"	Legit	Producer	MicMac Records
2009	"Drink It Up"	Mic & Pep	Producer	MicMac Records
2009	"Keep Our Love A Secret"	Nas-T Boyz	Producer	MicMac Records
2011	"Love Stays"	Rios Sisters	Remixer	MicMac Records
2011	"Already Yours"	Lil Eddie	Remixer	Manhattan Recordings
2012	"Radio (Everybody’s Dancin’)"	Danielle Simeone	Producer	MicMac Records
2012	"Silent Morning"	Parralox	Remixer	Conzoom Records
2013	"’Cause I Want You"	Ashley Wills	Producer	MicMac Records
2014	"Beautiful Life"	Judy Torres	Remixer	Contagious Records
2014	"Loving You (The Remixes)"	Solid	Producer	MicMac Records
2015	"Baby, I Don’t Care (Mickey Garcia Funk Melody)"	Corona	Remixer	Hothead Recordings
2017	"Change On Me (2017 Remixes)"	Cynthia	Producer	MicMac Records

=== Selected compilations ===
- C-Bank Orchestra - Christmas Is In The House (Next Plateau Records) (1987)
- The MicMac Concert - Hot 97 (MicMac Records) (1990)
- The MicMac Concert - Hot 97.7 (MicMac Records) (1990)
- The MicMac Concert – KTFM (MicMac Records) (1990)
- The MicMac Concert – Power 96 (MicMac Records) (1990)
- The MicMac Concert – Power 102 (MicMac Records) (1990)
- The MicMac Concert – Power 106 (MicMac Records) (1990)
- MicMac Dance Party Vol 1 (MicMac Records) (1991)
- Turnstyle Records Best Of Freestyle (Turnstyle Records) (1992)
- MicMac Dance Party Vol 2 (MicMac Records) (1992)
- Turnstyle Records Freestyle Greatest Hits (Turnstyle Records) (1992)
- MicMac House Dance Party Vol 1 (MicMac Records) (1993)
- MicMac Dance Party Vol 3 (MicMac Records) (1993)
- SPG Freestyle's Greatest Hits Vol 1 (SPG Records) (1993)
- MicMac Dance Party Vol 4 (MicMac Records) (1993)
- SPG Freestyle's Greatest Hits Vol 2 (SPG Records) (1994)
- MicMac Greatest Freestyle Hits Vol 1 (MicMac Records) (1994)
- MicMac Dance Party Vol 5 (MicMac Records) (1994)
- Tommy Boy Freestyle Greatest Beats Vol 1 (Tommy Boy Records) (1994)
- MicMac Greatest Freestyle Hits Vol 2 (MicMac Records) (1994)
- Tommy Boy Freestyle Greatest Beats Vol 2 (Tommy Boy Records) (1994)
- MicMac Dance Party Vol 6 (MicMac Records) (1994)
- Tommy Boy Freestyle Greatest Beats Vol 4 (Tommy Boy Records) (1994)
- MicMac Greatest Freestyle Hits Vol 3 (MicMac Records) (1994)
- Tommy Boy Freestyle Greatest Beats Vol 5 (Tommy Boy Records) (1994)
- MicMac Dance Party Vol 7 (MicMac Records) (1995)
- Freestyle Greatest Groups Vol 1 (MicMac Records) (1995)
- Freestyle Greatest Groups Vol 2 (MicMac Records) (1995)
- Freestyle Forever (MicMac Records) (1995)
- Cold Front - Freestyle Latin Dance Hits - Volume Two (Cold Front Records) (1995)
- MicMac House Dance Party 4 (MicMac Records) (1995)
- Freestyle's Greatest Divas Vol 1 (MicMac Records) (1995)
- ZYX Freestyle (ZYX Records) (1996)
- MicMac Greatest Freestyle Hits Vol 4 (MicMac Records) (1996)
- Thump'n Freestyle Quick Mixx (Thump Records) (1996)
- ZYX Freestyle Vol 2 (ZYX Records) (1996)
- MicMac House Dance Party Vol 3 (MicMac Records) (1996)
- Freestyle's Greatest Divas Vol 2 (MicMac Records) (1996)
- This Is Freestyle (Quality Music) (1996)
- Tim Spinnin' Schommer Freestyle Boom Vol 1 (Tim Schommer) (1997)
- Cold Front - Freestyle Latin Dance Hits - Volume Three (Cold Front Records) (1997)
- Freestyle's Greatest Divas Vol 3 (MicMac Records) (1997)
- ZYX Greatest Freestyle Hits (ZYX Records) (1997)
- Tommy Boy Freestyle Greatest Beats Vol 8 (Tommy Boy Records) (1997)
- SPG Music Freestyle Greatest Collection (SPG Records) (1997)
- ZYX Freestyle Vol 5 (ZYX Records) (1997)
- The Ballads Of Freestyle (MicMac Records) (1997)
- ZYX Freestyle Vol 4 (ZYX Records) (1997)
- Tommy Boy Freestyle Greatest Beats Vol 9 (Tommy Boy Records) (1997)
- Thump Freestyle Explosion Vol 5 (Thump Records) (1998)
- ZYX Freestyle HitMix (ZYX Records) (1998)
- MicMac House Dance Party Vol 2 (MicMac Records) (1998)
- ZYX Freestyle Vol 7 (ZYX Records) (1998)
- 21st Century Adrenaline Rush (21st Century Records) (1998)
- Popular Freestyle Frenzy Volume 4 ∙ Anthem After Anthem (Warlock Records) (1999)
- ZYX Freestyle Highlights Nonstop-Megamix (ZYX Records) (1999)
- Thump Freestyle Explosion Vol 3 (Thump Records) (2000)
- ZYX Freestyle Vol 12 (ZYX Records) (2000)
- Fever - Freestyle Fever's Divas (Fever Records) (2001)
- What If Productions The Best of Freestyle Megamix (What If Productions) (2001)
- Divas On The Dance Floor – House Music’s Greatest Divas (21st Century Records) (2002)
- PolySound Freestyle Classic Hits (Poly Sound Records) (2002)
- ZYX Freestyle Vol 18 (ZYX Records) (2002)
- Micmac 360 Tour (MicMac Records) (2003)
- Thump Freestyle Party (Thump Records) (2003)
- UBL Divas Of Freestyle (UBL Records) (2003)
- ZYX Freestyle Vol. 22 (ZYX Records) (2004)
- Bangin' Beats - Then & Now Vol 1 (MicMac Records) (2004)
- ZYX Freestyle Gold (ZYX Records) (2004)
- All The Hits and More! Cynthia (MicMac Records) (2005)
- All The Hits and More! Johnny O (MicMac Records) (2005)
- DJ Giuseppe D. – Evolution (MicMac Records) (2005)
- Bangin' Beats - Then & Now Vol 2 (MicMac Records) (2005)
- 12 Inches of MicMac Vol 1 (MicMac Records) (2005)
- Freestyle Hits Party Pack (MicMac Records) (2005)
- 12 Inches of MicMac Vol 2 (MicMac Records) (2005)
- Tim Spinnin' Schommer – Bringin' The Freestyle II (Tim Schommer) (2005)
- Bangin' Beats - Then & Now Vol 2 (MicMac Records) (2005)
- Benz Street Various – Freestyle (Benz Street Records) (2005)
- Dance Through The Holidays (MicMac Records) (2005)
- Coalition - A Common Cause (MicMac Records) (2006)
- Warlock Freestyle Mega Hits Vol 2 (Warlock Records) (2006)
- Bangin' Beats - Then & Now Vol 3 (MicMac Records) (2006)
- Razor & Tie Forever Freestyle 2 (Razor & Tie Records) (2006)
- 12 Inches of MicMac Vol 3 (MicMac Records) (2006)
- UBL Fierce Freestyle Classics (The Collection) (UBL Records) (2006)
- MicMac NOW! The Dance Remixes (MicMac Records) (2007)
- 12 Inches of MicMac Vol 4 (MicMac Records) (2007)
- Battle Of The Freestyle DJs (MicMac Records) (2007)
- Razor & Tie Forever Freestyle 1 (Razor & Tie Records) (2007)
- MicMac Latin House Party (MicMac Records) (2008)
- Freestyle Hits Party Pack Vol 2 (MicMac Records) (2008)
- Freestyle Hits Remixed – Giuseppe D. (MicMac Records) (2008)
- Bangin' Beats - Then & Now Vol 4 (MicMac Records) (2009)
- ZYX Freestyle Vol 37 (ZYX Records) (2009)
- Edits Gone Wild by Joey "Danger" Altura (MicMac Records) (2009)
- Ultimix 151 - Mic & Pep (Ultimix Records) (2009)
- Warlock Jersey Shore Anthems (Warlock Records) (2010)
- MicMac Original 12 Inch Club Versions Vol 1 (MicMac Records) (2011)
- MicMac Original 12 Inch Club Versions Vol 2 (MicMac Records) (2011)
- MicMac Original 12 Inch Club Versions Vol 3 (MicMac Records) (2011)
- MicMac Original 12 Inch Club Versions Vol 4 (MicMac Records) (2011)
- MicMac Original 12 Inch Club Versions Vol 5 (MicMac Records) (2011)
- MicMac Original 12 Inch Club Versions Vol 6 (MicMac Records) (2011)
- MicMac Original 12 Inch Club Versions Vol 7 (MicMac Records) (2011)
- MicMac Original 12 Inch Club Versions Vol 8 (MicMac Records) (2011)
- Ultimate Freestyle Dance Remixes by DJ/Producer Giuseppe D. (MicMac Records) (2011)
- Edits Gone Wild II by Freddy “The Edit” Rivera (MicMac Records) (2012)
- ZYX Various – Freestyle The Ultimate Collection (ZYX Records) (2013)
- Club Hits – Mixed by DJ Giuseppe D. (MicMac Records) (2015)
- Freestyle's Greatest Divas 2 Exciting CDs! (MicMac Records) (2016)
