= Remixes in the Key of B =

Remix album by Bobby Brown
- Released: 1993
- Recorded: 1992–1993
- Genre: R&B
- Length: 70:40
- Label: MCA
- Producer: Teddy Riley, Jermaine Dupri, Louil Silas Jr., Shock G, L.A. Reid

Bobby Brown chronology
B.Brown Posse (1993)	Remixes in the Key of B (1993)	Two Can Play That Game (1995)

Professional ratings
Review scores
Source	Rating
AllMusic	3.5/5 stars
Entertainment Weekly	not rated

Remixes in the Key of B is the second remix album by American singer Bobby Brown, released in 1993. It features remixes of songs from the album Bobby.

== Track listing ==
1. "Two Can Play That Game" – 7:10
2. "Shock G's Get Away" – 6:28
3. "T.R.'s Get Away" – 6:23
4. "Humpin' Around" – 8:08
5. "She's My Lady" – 5:45
6. "That's the Way Love Is" – 7:20
7. "Something in Common" (featuring Whitney Houston) – 7:00
8. "One More Night" – 6:21
9. "I Want You, I Need You" – 4:55
10. "Good Enough" – 4:48
11. "Storm Away" – 6:27
