= Two Can Play That Game (album) =

1995 remix album by Bobby Brown

Remix album / compilation album by Bobby Brown
- Released: 1995
- Label: MCA

Bobby Brown chronology
Remixes in the Key of B (1993)	Two Can Play That Game (1995)	Forever (1997)

Professional ratings
Review scores
Source	Rating
NME	3/10
Smash Hits	3/5 stars

Two Can Play That Game is a remix album by American singer Bobby Brown, released in 1995 on MCA Records. The album contains remixes of tracks from two of Brown's studio albums—Don't Be Cruel (1988) and Bobby (1992)—plus two tracks which appear in their original versions ("Don't Be Cruel" and "On Our Own"). The K-Klass remix of "Two Can Play That Game", which was released as a single, became a big hit throughout Europe in 1995, including reaching number three in the UK Singles Chart, becoming Brown's biggest hit single in that country. Three other singles were released from the album, all of them reaching the UK top 30: "Humpin' Around", also remixed by K-Klass (No. 8), "My Prerogative", remixed by Joe T. Vannelli (No. 17), and "Every Little Step", remixed by C.J. Mackintosh (No. 25).

== Track listing ==
No.	Title	Writer(s)	Length
1.	"Two Can Play That Game" (K-Klassik Radio Mix)	Teddy Riley; Bernard Belle; David "Redhead" Guppy; Bobby Brown	3:31
2.	"Humpin' Around" (K-Klassik Radio Mix)	Antonio Reid; Kenneth Edmonds; Daryl Simmons; Brown; Thomas Keyes; Jan C. "Stylz" Styles	3:48
3.	"That's the Way Love Is" (Vincent Herbert Remix)	Brown; Riley; Aqil Davidson; Demetrius Shipp; Thomas R. Taliaferro	7:21
4.	"Don't Be Cruel"	Edmonds; Reid; Simmons	7:22
5.	"Something in Common" (L.A. Reid Remix, featuring Whitney Houston)	Riley; Houston; Brown; Belle; Mark Middleton; Alfred Rosemond	6:46
6.	"Get Away" (M.K. Extended Mix)	Belle; Brown; Louil Silas Jr.; Riley; Tony Haynes	7:35
7.	"On Our Own"	Reid; Edmonds	4:28
8.	"My Prerogative" (Joe T. Vannelli Light Edit)	Brown; Aaron Hall; Riley	4:17
9.	"Every Little Step" (C.J. Mackintosh 7" Mix)	Edmonds; Reid	3:45
10.	"Good Enough" (Chris "Tricky" Stewart & Sean "Sep" Hall Remix)	Edmonds; Reid; Simmons	4:44
11.	"One More Night" (Chris "Tricky" Stewart & Sean "Sep" Hall Remix)	Riley; Herb Middleton; Belle	5:21
12.	"Rock Wit'cha" (L.A. & Babyface Remix)	Edmonds; Darnell Bristol	4:46

== Charts ==
Chart (1995)	Peak position
Australian Albums (ARIA)	161
Dutch Albums (Album Top 100)	32
UK Albums (OCC)	24
UK R&B Albums (OCC)	9
