= Cynthia (disambiguation) =

Cynthia is a feminine given name.

Cynthia may also refer to:

== Culture ==
- Cynthia (Gaba girl), American plaster mannequin of the 1930s
- "CynthIA", a nickname given by radio enthusiasts to a synthetic female voice used on numbers stations believed to be operated by the CIA
- Cynthia (telenovela), a Mexican telenovela
- "Cynthia", a song by Bruce Springsteen from the box set Tracks
- Cynthia (film) (1947), starring Elizabeth Taylor
- Cynthia (singer), American freestyle and dance-pop singer
  - Cynthia (album), 1989
- Cynthia (Pokémon), fictional character in the Pokémon franchise

== Nature ==
- Cynthia (butterfly), a group of butterfly species in the genus Vanessa.
- Krigia biflora, known as the two-flowered cynthia

== Places ==
- Cynthia, Queensland, a rural town and locality in the North Burnett Region, Australia
- Cynthia Peninsula, a peninsula in northeastern Ontario, Canada
- Cynthia, Alberta, a hamlet in central Alberta, Canada
- Cynthia, Mississippi, an unincorporated community in the United States

== Other ==
- Cynthia, codename of Amy Elizabeth Thorpe (1910-1963), Anglo-American spy
- HMS Cynthia, the name of five ships of the Royal Navy, and a sixth which was never completed
- A.S.D. Cynthia 1920, an Italian football club

== See also ==
- Synthia, nickname for a genetically modified bacterium (synthetic organism)
- Cyclone Xynthia, a violent European windstorm that killed more than 50 people in February 2010
- Cindy (given name)
