= DJ Tonka =

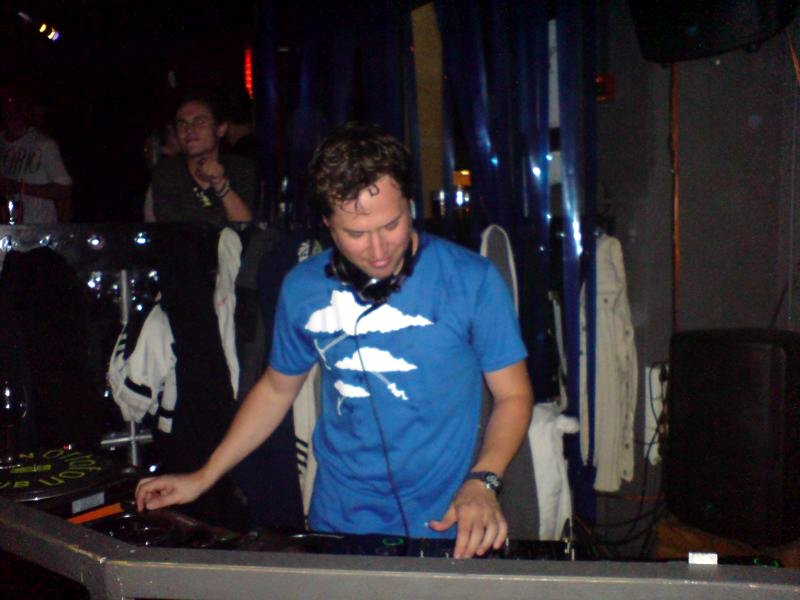
- DJ Tonka DJing at Sikamikanico in Oslo, Norway on 8 September 2007

Background information
- Also known as: DJ Tonka; Tonka; Thomastic; Chip Tunes
- Born: Thomas-René Gerlach; June 24, 1973 (age 53); Mainz, Rhineland-Pfalz, West Germany
- Genres: Electronic; house
- Occupations: DJ; record producer
- Years active: 1991–present
- Labels: Force Inc. Music Works; Uplifting Records; Vivienne Records
- Website: djtonka.com

Thomas-René Gerlach (born June 24, 1973), known professionally as DJ Tonka, is a German electronic dance musician. He is also known as Tonka, Chip Tunes, and Thomastic.

== Musical career ==
In his early career, Thomas-René Gerlach worked with fellow producer Ian Pooley in the groups Outrage, Space Cube, and T'N'I. Together they produced several records in techno, progressive house and breakbeat. In 1996, the partnership was dissolved (an EP with unreleased tracks was still released in 1997), and coincidentally, both started producing a more mainstream-friendly sound.

As a solo artist, Gerlach took on the name DJ Tonka and began producing house music, with influences from synthpop and the American garage house scene. He achieved some notoriety as a remixer, reworking tunes such as "Trapped" for disco artist Colonel Abrams, "Love Shack" for The B-52's and "Push It" for Salt-N-Pepa.

Tonka cites Grandmaster Flash and Depeche Mode among his influences. He has also founded two record labels: Uplifting Records in 1997 and Vivienne Records in 2000.

== Discography ==
=== Studio albums ===
- 1998: Peaktime (In One Go) (Warner/Germany)
- 2004: 84 (Uplifting Rec. Warner/Germany)

=== Singles & EPs ===
- 1995: "Flashback" (Force Inc. US)
- 1995: "Flashback, Remixes" (Outland Rec./NL)
- 1995: "Got to Get Up" (Force Inc. 100)
- 1995: "Feel" (Force Inc. US, Disco Magic/Italy, Airplay Rec./France)
- 1995: "Feel, Remixes" (Force Inc. US)
- 1995: "Phun-ky" (Force Inc. US, Skint/UK, Dance Net/Australia)
- 1996: Feel Phun-ky EP (Outland Rec./NL)
- 1996: "Old Skool" (F.Inc.US, Dance Net/Aus, Happy One/Danm, Pen Pot/Italy)
- 1996: "Feel the Street vs. Deskee" (Force Inc. US)
- 1996: "Feel the Street vs. Deskee" Remixes (Outland Rec./NL)
- 1996: "Radical Noise, Remixes" (Outland Rec./NL)
- 1996: "Happiness" (Force Inc. US)
- 1997: "Old Skool" (Joey Negro Rmx) (Club Masters/UK)
- 1997: "Old Skool" (Fletch Remix) (Happy One/Danm)
- 1997: "The Night", Security (Upl, Warn/Ger, Ginger Music/Spain, Hitland/Italy, Airplane/France)
- 1998: "She Knows You" (Uplifting Rec./Warner)
- 1998: "She Knows You" (Birthday Edition) (Uplifting Rec.)
- 2000: "Don't Be Afraid" (Vivienne Rec., Warner/Ger., BlancoYNegro/Spain)
- 2000: "Don't Be Afraid" (Nerio's Dubwork Remix) (Promo Only/Warner)
- 2002: "J.O.E, Never!" (Vivienne Rec.)
- 2002: "Keep Klimbing" (Vivienne Rec.)
- 2004: "84" (Vivienne Rec. Warner)
- 2004: "Get Back, PT1" (Vivienne Rec. Warner, BlancoYNegro/Spain)
- 2004: "Get Back, PT2" (Vivienne Rec. Warner, BlancoYNegro/Spain)
- 2008: "Orca", Freeze (Munich Disco Tech Vol.1, Great Stuff Germany)
- 2008: "Orca" (Ian Pooley Rmx) (Munich Disco Tech Vol.2, Great Stuff/Germany)
- 2008: Drop Box EP (Alphabet City/Germany)
- 2009: Ready for War EP (Southern Fried Records/UK)
- 2011: "Aliens & Earthlings" (WePLAY/Germany)
- 2012: "Atlantis" (WePLAY/Germany)
- 2012: "Atlantis Remixes" (WePLAY/Germany)
- 2015: "Calippo - 4U" (Enormous Tunes)
- 2016: "Security" (Cat 'N Dogz 2016 Edit) (12", S/Sided) (Petsedits, Pets Recordings)
- 2019: "Don't Stop" (Big & Dirty)

TONKA presents CHIP TUNES

- 2001: Heartjumpa, Reflect, Fallin', Passion (Chip Tunes, Warner/Germany)

=== Mix-CDs ===
- 1998: The House of Disco (Vision Sound Carriers/Germany)
- 2000: Essential Streetparades / Proved (Warner Music/Germany)

=== Remixes ===
- 1995: Ian Pooley - "Celtic Cross Remixes" (Force Inc.)
- 1996: Celvin Rotane - "You've Got to Be You" (Alphabet City/Edel)
- 1996: The Moodyman - "The Dancer" (After Midnight Rec., UCA Records/NL)
- 1996: Smokin Beats - "Disco Dancin'" (Music Man, Legato Rec., News/Belgium)
- 1996: Full Intention - "America" (Logic/Germany, Sugar Daddy, Stress Rec/UK)
- 1996: The Hipgrinders - "Good Times" (Positiva, Additive/UK)
- 1996: Gina G - "I Belong to You" (Eternal, Warner/UK)
- 1997: Colonel Abrahams - "Trapped" (Up Beat, Warner/Germany, Mantra/Italy, Ginger/Spain)
- 1997: Jimmy Somerville - "Safe" (Heaven Rec./Germany, Ginger/Spain)
- 1997: Bootsy Collins - "I'm Leavin' U" (Gotta Go, Gotta Go)" (feat. MC Lyte) (Warner/Germany, Mercury/US)
- 1997: Dave Angel - "Funk Music" (Island/UK)
- 1998: The Funkjunkeez a.k.a. Roger Sanchez - "Got Funk?" (Strictly/US, Motor/Germany)
- 1998: Louise - "All That Matters" (EMI/UK)
- 1998: Urban Soul - "Love Is So Nice" (VC, Virgin/UK)
- 1998: Black & White Brothers - "Put Your Hands Up" (Edel/Germany, Happy Music/France)
- 1998: DJ Tonka vs The B52's - "Love Shack" (Warner/Germany, Reprise/US)
- 1998: K-Klass - "Live It Up" (EMI/UK, Dance Factory/Italy)
- 1999: Salt-N-Pepa - "Push It" (Motor/Germany)
- 1999: Tony Esposito - "Kalimba De Luna" (Warner/Germany)
- 2000: Dominica - "Gotta Let You Go" (Fuel, East West, Warner/Germany, Outland Music/NL)
- 2000: Bump a.k.a. Steve Travell & MA - "I'm Rushing" (Fuel, East West, Warn/Germany)
- 2001: Cleptomaniacs a.k.a. Brian Tappert & John Julius Knight – "All I Do" (Edel/Germany)
- 2002: Robin S. - "Show Me Love" (Stereoph, BMG/Ger., Champion/UK)
- 2002: Robin S. - "Luv 4 Luv" (Stereophonic, BMG, Champion/UK)
- 2002: Alizée - "L'Alizé (Tonka's Sunny Season Mix)" (Universal/Germany & France)
- 2002: Sharam Jey pres the Punisher - "Straight Up!" (King Kong Rec, Warner/Germany)
- 2004: Ian Pooley ft Jade & Dantelle - "Heaven" (Pooled Music, MOS/Germany)
- 2004: Erick Morillo ft. Leslie Carter - "Waiting in the Darkness" (Subliminal/US)
- 2005: Tonka vs The Adjuster - "All Over Again" (Disco Inc., Force Inc./Germany)
- 2005: Room 5 a.k.a. Junior Jack - "Make Love 2005" (EMI/Germany)
- 2006: Ian Pooley & Tonka - "Celtic Cross 2006" (Pooled Music/Germany)
- 2006: Erick Morillo ft P.Diddy - "Dance I Said" (Subliminal/US)
- 2008: MDX & Namito - "Hot & Spicy" (Long Distance Rec./Australia)
- 2009: Gus Gus - "Lust" (Great Stuff/Germany)
- 2009: Ian Pooley vs Zoo Brazil - "Reader" (Pooled Music/Germany)
- 2009: Coburn - "We Re-Interrupt This Programme" (Tasted, Great Stuff/Germany)
- 2009: Aquasky - "You Know We Do It Big Girl" (Passenger/UK)
- 2009: AudioFun - "Dirty Gold" (Freek Records/UK)
- 2010: Ellie Goulding - "Guns and Horses" (Polydor/UK)
- 2010: Housse de Racket - "Oh Yeah!" (M20 Solution, Kuskus/France)
- 2010: Simon Rose - "Stachus" (Bobble Music/Germany)
- 2010: Mercedes - "Shock Absorber" (Eye Industries/UK)
- 2010: Aggro Santos - "Saint or Sinner" (Mercury Records, Future Rec./UK)
- 2010: The Wanted - "Heart Vacancy" (Geffen Records/UK)
- 2011: Natalia Kills - "Mirrors" (Interscope Rec./USA)
- 2011: Dabruck & Klein ft Ollie James - "I Found Love" (WePLAY/Germany)
- 2011: Arty - "Around the World" (WePLAY/Germany, Anjunabeats/UK)
- 2012: The Disco Boys - "Around the World" (WePLAY/Germany)
- 2012: Medina - "Forever" (EMI/ Germany)
- 2012: Laserkraft 3D - "Urlaub" (WePLAY/Germany)
- 2015: Robin Schulz - "Headlights (DJ Tonka's Sunlight Radio Mix)" (TONSPIEL/Warner Music Group)

=== Other projects ===
THOMASTIC (Productions & Remixes)

- 1993 Eurostyle Tunes Vol.1 (Intense Rec./Germany)
- 1993 I Want to Be Free - Rmx (Intense Rec. BMG Ariola/Germany)
- 1993 Dream Team EP, Whirlpool Prod. - Dreaming, Remixes (Intense Rec./Germany)

T´N´I (DJ Tonka & Ian Pooley)

- 1991 Low Mass E.P. (Force Inc./Germany)
- 1991 Trip Men w. Alec Empire (Force Inc./Germany)
- 1991 Paris, No More Ugly Germans, Compilation & Single (Sony Music, Germany)
- 1992 Disco Beam E.P. (Intense Rec. Germany)
- 1992 Do You Still Care? ft Marie Pullins (Polydor/Germany)
- 1993 Depart EP (Intense Rec/Germany)
- 1993 I Want to Be Free (Intense Rec., BMG Ariola/Germany)
- 1994 Mad Situation, Be Straight (Force Inc./Germany)
- 1995 Nothing Can Stop Us (Force Inc.100 Compilation/Germany)

T´N´I Remixes (DJ Tonka & Ian Pooley)

- 1992 Paris Red - Do Ya (Feel It) (Dance Pool, Sony Music/Germany)
- 1992 The Bionaut - Everybody is Kissing Everyone (Intense Rec/Germany)
- 1992 Paradise Project - Deep Green (Sony, Germany)
- 1993 Dream Team EP w. Whirlpool Prod. - Dreaming (Intense Rec./Germany)
- 1993 Formosa - Dr. Strangelove (Sony/Germany)
- 1993 Rainforest - The Birds (Now! Rec./Germany)
- 1993 House Pimps - Get The Hook (Now! Rec./Germany)

SPACE CUBE (DJ Tonka & Ian Pooley)

- 1991 Space Cube EP (Force Inc./Germany)
- 1992 Machine & Motion (Force Inc./Germany)
- 1992 Pure Tendency - Ritchie Hawtin Rmx (R&S Rec./Belgium)
- 1992 Kool Killer EP 1 (Force Inc/Germany)
- 1993 Kool Killer EP 2 (Force Inc./Germany)
- 1993 Kool Killer EP 3 (Force Inc./Germany)
- 1993 Kool Killer EP, UK Mixes (Edge Rec/UK)
- 1993 The Latest Adventures Of Kool Killer (Dragnet/Sony, Germany)
- 1993 Sassion ft Gordon Matthewman & Force Mass Motion (Edge Rec/UK)
- 1993 The Unrel. Project EP (Solid Preassure Continental/CH)
- 1994 Inbound, Outbound (Riot Beats/Germany)
- 1994 Kommerz Killer (Riot Beats/Germany)
- 1995 Dschungelfieber, Remixes (Riot Beats/Germany)
- 1996 DJ Tonka & Ian Pooley's Unrel. Space Cube Tracks (Upflifting Rec./Germany)

SPACE CUBE Remixes (DJ Tonka & Ian Pooley)

- 1993 Ilsa Gold - Silke (Force Inc./Germany)
- 1993 N.R.G. - I Need Your Lovin' (Force Inc./Germany, Chill Rec./UK, Pyro Tech/US)
- 1993 D.A.C. Robinson - Lucky Strike (Rabbit City Records/UK)
- 1995 Legend B - Lost In Love (Lanka/Germany)

OUTRAGE (DJ Tonka & Ian Pooley)

- 1991 Emperor, Daylight (Force Inc./Germany)
