= Call It Watcha Like =

Studio album by Johnny O
- Released: September 5, 1995
- Genre: Freestyle
- Label: ex-It Records

Johnny O chronology
The Remixes (1993)	Call It Watcha Like (1995)	Best of Johnny O (1997)

Call It Watcha Like is the third studio album by freestyle singer Johnny O, released on September 5, 1995, by record label ex-It Records.

From that album came out four singles, the first single, "Runaway Love", the song that made it big on the charts, and the second song released by Johnny O to enter the Billboard Hot 100 (the other was "Dreamboy/Dreamgirl "partnered with Cynthia), at position 87. None of the subsequent singles achieved success.

The album failed to get into any music chart.

== Tracks ==
No.	Title	Length
1.	"I Know That You Love Me"	4:19
2.	"I'm Gonna Make You Mine"	5:10
3.	"I'm So Into You"	5:32
4.	"Runaway Love"	3:55
5.	"Love Letters"	4:04
6.	"Sexy Girl"	4:38
7.	"Freestyle"	5:02
8.	"I Promise"	4:16
9.	"I Know That You Love Me" (Reprise)	4:01

Bonus Track - Edition of Germany

No.	Title	Length
10.	"Fantasy Girl" (Original Version)	3:58

== Charts ==
Singles

Year	Single	Chart	Peak position
1993/1994	"Runaway Love"	Hot Dance Music/Maxi-Singles Sales	4
1993/1994	"Runaway Love"	The Billboard Hot 100	87
