= Two Can Play That Game =

Two Can Play That Game may refer to:

- Two Can Play That Game (film), a 2001 American romantic comedy film
- "Two Can Play That Game" (song), a 1992 song by Bobby Brown, remixed and released as a single in 1994/1995
- Two Can Play That Game (album), a 1995 remix album by Bobby Brown
