= She's All I Need =

She's All I Need or variants may refer to:

- "She's All I Need", a song by Bobby Brown from the 1997 album Forever
- "She's All I Need", a song by Michael Fall from the 2013 album Turn On Your Radio
