= Sound of the Underground =

Sound of the Underground may refer to:

- Sound of the Underground (album), the 2003 debut studio album by Girls Aloud
  - "Sound of the Underground" (song), the title track and lead single from the aforementioned album
- Sound of the Underground, 1994 Toronto house compilation by SPG Records
- "Sound of the Underground", a track by Dave Koz from the album Saxophonic

== See also ==
- True Sound of the Underground, an album by Sister Sin
- The Solid Sound of the Underground, a compilation album by So Solid Crew
- The Toronto Sound of the Underground, a 1994 compilation album by SPG Records
- "Jack to the Sound of the Underground", a 1988 single by Hithouse
