= SPG =

SPG can refer to:

== Places ==
- Albert Whitted Airport (IATA: SPG), in St. Petersburg, Florida
- Springfield Union Station, Massachusetts, Amtrak station code SPG
- Springvale railway station, Melbourne, station code SPG

== Arts, entertainment, and media ==
=== Music ===
- Slumber Party Girls, an all-girl American pop band
- SPG Records, a Canadian independent dance record label
- Steam Powered Giraffe, a steampunk musical project

=== Other arts, entertainment, and media ===
- Shortest proof game, a type of chess problem
- Special Patrol Group, a hamster in the British TV series The Young Ones
- Strong Parental Guidance, a television rating used by the Philippine Movie and Television Review and Classification Board
- The Super Parental Guardians, a Philippine action comedy film

== Organizations and enterprises ==
- Simon Property Group, US, NYSE symbol
- Society for the Propagation of the Gospel in Foreign Parts, Church of England, 1701-1964
- Special Patrol Group (RUC) of the Royal Ulster Constabulary
- Special Patrol Group of the Metropolitan Police
- Special Protection Group for the Prime Minister of India
- Starwood Preferred Guest, a defunct loyalty program
- State Protection Group of the New South Wales police

== Technology ==
- Self-propelled gun, a gun mounted on a self-propelled chassis, usually referring to Self-propelled artillery or Self-propelled anti-tank gun
- Submersible pressure gauge in scuba diving
- Sync pulse generator, a type of video-signal generator

== Other uses ==
- Saab 900 SPG, a variation model of the Saab 900
- Sarong party girl, a Singaporean insult
- Spastic gait gene, causing hereditary spastic paraplegia
- Steals per game, a basketball statistic
