= The Masterpiece (album) =

Studio album by Bobby Brown
- Released: June 5, 2012
- Recorded: 2009–2012
- Genre: R&B
- Length: 39:12
- Labels: Bronx Bridge; UMG
- Producers: Blaze the Champ; Jared Lee Gosselin; Matt Hennessey

Bobby Brown chronology
Gold (2009)	The Masterpiece (2012)

The Masterpiece is the fifth studio album by American singer Bobby Brown, released on June 5, 2012, by Bronx Bridge Entertainment. It is his first studio album in 15 years since Forever. It is also his first album to be issued the Parental Advisory label.

Professional ratings
Review scores
Source	Rating
AllMusic	link

== Track listing ==
No.	Title	Writer(s)	Producer(s)	Length
1.	"Don't Let Me Die"	Bobby Brown; Christopher L. Brown; Fred Crawford; Destiny Andrews	Blaze the Champ	3:47
2.	"Doesn't Anybody Know" (featuring Ralph Tresvant)	B. Brown; Tresvant	Blaze the Champ^{[b]}	4:34
3.	"Get Out the Way"	B. Brown; Jared Gosselin; Phillip White; Alicia Etheredge	Gosselin	3:31
4.	"Damaged"	B. Brown; Ben Franklin	Franklin	3:35
5.	"Can't Give Up"	B. Brown; Gosselin; Mika Lett; Lamar Mitchell	Gosselin; Matthew Hennessey^{[a]}	3:31
6.	"Set Me Free"	B. Brown; Gosselin; Craig Erquhart; Brandon Erquhart	Gosselin; Hennessey^{[a]}	3:43
7.	"Starmaker" (featuring Jayre)	B. Brown; Christopher L. Brown; Crawford; James Artissen; Bobby Brown Jr.	Blaze the Champ	4:04
8.	"Exit Wounds"	B. Brown; Gosselin; Orbel Babayan; Mika Lett; Celeste Felicia Scalone	Gosselin	4:32
9.	"All Is Fair" (featuring Johnny Gill)	Stevie Wonder	Gosselin; Blaze the Champ^{[b]}	3:42
10.	"The Man I Want to Be"	B. Brown; Jeffrey Steele; Vicky McGehee	Gosselin	4:13
Total length:				39:12

Notes

- ^{^[a]} signifies a co-producer
- ^{^[b]} signifies a vocal producer

== Personnel ==
Credits for The Masterpiece adapted from AllMusic.

- Kenny Aronoff – drums (8, 10)
- Ron Avant – keyboards (8, 9)
- Orbel Babayan – guitar (6, 8, 10)
- Blaze – backing vocals (9)
- Ian Branch – additional mixing (1, 2, 5–10)
- Bobby Brown – executive producer
- Christopher L. Brown – executive producer
- Paul Cabbin – music (2)
- Mabvuto Carpenter – vocals (background)
- Rod Castro – additional guitars
- April Dawson – cover design
- Keith Eaddy – bass (9)
- Craig "Seejai" Erquhart – backing vocals (6)
- Alicia Etheredge – executive producer
- Marshall Goodman – drums (9)
- Jared Lee Gosselin – programming (5, 6)
- Bernie Grundman – mastering
- Matt Hennessey – mixing (4–6, 8–10)
- Sean Horton – drums (6)
- Jean Marie Hovat – mixing (3)
- Mika Lett – backing vocals (5, 8, 10)
- James Lomenzo – bass (8, 10)
- Lamar Mitchell – keyboards (5), synthesizer (6)
- Terrill Paul – backing vocals (1, 7)
- Skip Saylor – mixing (1, 2, 6, 7, 9), additional mixing (1, 2, 5–10), additional production
- Mandy Strong – CD layout
- Ralph Tresvant – backing vocals (1, 7)
- Zoux – keyboards (5, 9)

== Charts ==
Chart (2012)	Peak position
US Top R&B Albums	41
