= B. Brown Posse =

Compilation album by Various artists
- Released: April 27, 1993
- Recorded: 1992–1993
- Genres: R&B, hip hop
- Label: MCA
- Producers: Bobby Brown, Nate Smith, Tommy Brown

Bobby Brown chronology
Bobby (1992)	B. Brown Posse (1993)	Remixes in the Key of B (1993)

Professional ratings
Review scores
Source	Rating
Allmusic	3/5 stars

B. Brown Posse is a compilation album released in 1993 by Bobby Brown. The album features Brown on two of the eleven tracks, with the rest of the songs being sung (and sometimes rapped) by some of Bobby's friends.

The album features five artists, each of whom have a solo song. The only single "Drop It on the One" featured all five artists, with the addition of Brown, but failed to make an impact on the charts.

== Artists ==
The following artists appear alongside Brown on the album: Harold Travis, Smoothe Sylk, Dede O'Neal, Coop B and Stylez.

== Track listing ==
- Track listing
1. "Drop It on the One" - B. Brown Posse
2. "It's My Life" - Smoothe Sylk
3. "Your Love" - Dede O'Neal featuring Bobby Brown
4. "La La La" - Harold Travis
5. "Let Me Touch You" - Smoothe Sylk
6. "Where Did Love Go" - Harold Travis
7. "Why'd U Hurt Me" - Dede O'Neal
8. "Bounce" - Stylz
9. "Rollin' wit the Roughness" - Coop B
10. "1 Thru 12" - Stylz
11. "Nothing Comes for Free" - Coop B

== Charts ==
Weekly chart performance for B. Brown Posse
Chart (1993)	Peak position
Australian Albums (ARIA)	165
