= HMS Cynthia =

Five ships of the Royal Navy have borne the name HMS Cynthia. A sixth was planned but never completed:

- HMS Cynthia (1796) was an 18-gun sloop launched in 1796 and broken up in 1809.
- HMS Cynthia (1810) was a 16-gun sloop listed between 1810 and 1815.
- HMS Cynthia (1826) was the Falmouth, Cornwall Post Office Packet Service packet brig Prince Regent, launched in 1821, that the Navy purchased in 1826, and renamed when it took over the packet service. She was wrecked off Barbados on 6 June 1827.
- HMS Cynthia was to have been a Rosario-class wooden screw sloop. She was laid down in 1861 but cancelled in 1863.
- HMS Cynthia (1898) was a destroyer launched in 1898, classified as a D-class destroyer in 1913 and sold in 1920.
- HMS Cynthia (J345) was a Catherine-class minesweeper launched in 1943 and transferred to the Royal Navy under lend-lease. She was returned to the US Navy in 1947.
