= Like a Stranger (album) =

Studio album by Johnny O
- Released: 1990
- Genre: Freestyle
- Label: Micmac Records

Johnny O chronology
Johnny O (1989)	Like a Stranger (1990)	The Remixes (1993)

Like a Stranger is the second studio album by freestyle music singer Johnny O, released in 1990 by Micmac Records label.

Three singles were released from the album, the first of which, "Dreamboy / Dreamgirl", a duet with singer Cynthia, peaked at number 53 on the Billboard Hot 100. The singles, "We Can Not Go On This Way" and "I Just Wanna Get to Know You (If It's Alright With You)", were not as successful.

The song "Bad Mamma Jamma" is a cover of the song originally released by Carl Carlton and "Kiss & Say Goodbye" is a cover of the song originally released by The Manhattans.

== Track listing ==
No.	Title	Length
1.	"Don't Ever Want to Lose Your Love"	5:11
2.	"Like a Stranger"	4:38
3.	"I Gave My Heart to You"	3:42
4.	"Dreamboy/Dreamgirl" (feat. Cynthia)	4:23
5.	"We Can't Go On This Way"	4:52
6.	"Don't Give Up on Love"	4:00
7.	"I Just Wanna Get to Know You (If It's Alright With You)"	4:20
8.	"Bad Mamma Jamma"	4:52
9.	"Kiss & Say Goodbye"	3:59

== Charts ==
Singles - Billboard

Year	Single	Chart	Position
1990	"Dreamboy / Dreamgirl"	Hot Dance Music/Maxi-Singles Sales	17
1990	"Dreamboy / Dreamgirl"	Billboard Hot 100	53
