= Cynthia II =

Studio album by Cynthia
- Released: July 1, 1991
- Genre: Freestyle
- Label: Micmac Records

Cynthia chronology
Cynthia (1990)	Cynthia II (1991)	Cynthia the Remixes (1995)

Cynthia II is the second studio album by freestyle musician Cynthia, released 1 July 1991 by the label Micmac Records. The singles from this album were "Dreamboy / Dreamgirl," a collaboration with singer Johnny O, which reached position # 53 on the Billboard Hot 100, and "Break Up to Make Up", which reached position # 70 on July 20, 1991 in the Billboard Hot 100.

== Tracks ==
No.	Title	Length
1.	"What Will It Take"	4:03
2.	"Never Thought I Let You Go"	4:19
3.	"One Mistake"	3:06
4.	"Dreamboy/Dreamgirl" (duet with Johnny O)	4:21
5.	"Pledging All My Love"	3:46
6.	"Best Lovers/Best Friends"	4:07
7.	"Break Up to Make Up"	3:57
8.	"Forever Missing You"	4:10

== Performance on the charts ==
Singles - Billboard

Year	Single	Record chart	Position
1990	"Dreamboy / Dreamgirl"	Billboard Hot 100	53
1990	"Dreamboy / Dreamgirl"	Hot Dance Music/Maxi-Singles Sales	17
1991	"Break Up to Make Up"	Billboard Hot 100	70
