= Dreamboy/Dreamgirl =

Single by Cynthia and Johnny O

from the album Cynthia II (Cynthia) and Like a Stranger (Johnny O)
- Released: 1990
- Genre: Freestyle
- Producer(s): Mickey Garcia

Cynthia single singles chronology
"Thief of Heart" (1989)	"Dreamboy/Dreamgirl" (1990)	"What Will It Take" (1991)

Johnny O single singles chronology
"Megamix" (1990)	"Dreamboy/Dreamgirl" (1990)	"We Can't Go On This Way" (1991)

"Dreamboy/Dreamgirl" is a single released by Cynthia and Johnny O. This duet was the most successful song on the Billboard Hot 100 released by either artist, peaking at No. 53 in 1990.

== Charts ==
Chart (1990)	Peak position
US Billboard Hot 100	53
US Hot Dance Music/Maxi-Singles Sales (Billboard)	17
