= Judy Torres =

- Born: June 13, 1968 (age 57)
- Origin: Bronx, New York
- Genres: Freestyle, Dance
- Occupation: Singer
- Labels: Profile, Mic-Mac Records

Judith "Judy" Torres (born June 13, 1968 in The Bronx, New York City) is an American freestyle music artist and dance-pop singer.

== Early life and career ==
Growing up in the Bronx, Torres was the oldest of five siblings. She attended St. Thomas Aquinas, and the all girls Aquinas High School. Torres scored club hits with songs such as "Please Stay Tonight," "Come into My Arms," "Love Story," "I Love You, Will You Love Me," and her first single "No Reason to Cry." A love-themed freestyle written by Mickey Garcia, "No Reason to Cry" peaked at #30 on the Billboard Hot Dance Charts. Her debut album, Love Story, which was released in 1989 on Profile Records, is a freestyle collection, which included Ken Cedar-penned "Weakness of the Body", which was originally recorded by a teenage Mariah Carey. Her second album, My Soul, was released in 1992. The album features such hits as attitudinal song "Every Little Lie," which tells a tale of an unfaithful man who, instead of ending the relationship amicably, decides to lead her on and she confronts him about it.

Torres previously had a regular Sunday night Freestyle show on New York's popular radio station WKTU 103.5 named "Freestyle Free for All." She is currently on-air at KTU from 3 pm to 8 pm on Sundays; she has been a performer and on-air personality at KTU for over 17 years.

In 2001, Torres scored a club hit with the sentimental love song "Back in Your Arms Again." It peaked at #7 on the Hot Dance Music/Club Play chart, her highest charting single yet. It was also featured in a remix version on the popular compilation series White Party. In 2004, she released her debut single on the label Robbins Entertainment that was titled "The Air I Breathe," which featured freestyle artist Collage. It is a Hi-NRG song produced by A-List producer Tony Moran. The single performed modestly on the charts, making the Top 40 of the Hot Dance Music/Club Play, peaking about No. 30. It was around this time at a live performance at the Manhattan venue The Star Lounge in Chelsea when New York City freestyle promoter and host Steve Sylvester introduced and officially dubbed Judy the "Queen Of Freestyle".

In late 2005, Judy released the single "Faithfully." The song received airplay at dance stations. It is a cover of a 1983 hit by the band Journey. The single soon peaked at No. 1 as one of the requested songs on WKTU. Other Rhythmic/Dance format radio stations in the U.S. added the single from New York to their playlists. In August 2007, Torres returned to her Freestyle music roots with the single "I Don't." The song is a cover of Danielle Peck's Top 30 country hit written by Clay Mills/Peck/Burton Collins. In November 2008, Judy released "Hell, No," an anthem for abused women.

Judy Torres appears in the 2012 film Elliot Loves, in which she plays the role of Aunt Nani.

On March 18, 2018, Torres announced her one-woman off Broadway debut, No Reason To Cry, with performances scheduled for June 22 and 23 in New York City. A third show was later scheduled for June 24, 2018. Four additional show dates were later announced for July 4–7 in New York City.

== Discography ==
- Love Story – 1989, Profile/Arista/BMG Records
- My Soul – 1992, Profile/Arista/BMG Records
- Greatest Hits – 2002, Empire Musicwerks/Universal Records

== Singles ==
- "No Reason To Cry" (1996 remix #16) (#30 on the Billboard Hot Dance Club Songs)
- "Come into My Arms" (#19 on the Billboard Hot Dance Club Songs)
- "Love Story" (#47 on the Billboard Hot Dance Club Songs)
- "Love You, Will You Love Me" (1989)
- "Please Stay Tonight" (1989)
- "Missing Part" (1990)
- "I Love You For All Seasons"(1992)
- "Every Little Lie" (1993)
- "Holding On" (1996)
- "Back in Your Arms Again" (1999)
- "The Air I Breathe" (2004)
- "Faithfully" (2005) (#6 Billboard Dance/Mix Show Airplay)
- "I Don't" (2007)
- "Hell No" (2008) (#43 Billboard Hot Dance Club Songs)
- "Stay" (2010)
- "Beautiful Life" (2012)

== See also ==
- Nuyorican
- Puerto Ricans in New York City
