= Rhythm Is a Mystery =

- Cover of a 1991 UK CD single release.

Single by K-Klass

from the album Universal
- Released: 1991
- Studio: Studio House Stockport
- Genre: Dance-pop; house
- Label: Deconstruction
- Songwriters: K-Klass; Mark Stagg
- Producer: K-Klass

K-Klass singles chronology
"The Wildlife EP" (1990)	"Rhythm Is a Mystery" (1991)	"So Right" (1992)

Music video
- "Rhythm Is a Mystery" on YouTube

"Rhythm Is a Mystery" is the debut single by British electronic music group K-Klass, released in 1991 by Deconstruction Records, and later included on the group's debut album, Universal (1993). The song is written by the group and Mark Stagg, and features lead vocals performed by Bobbi Depasois. It peaked at number three on the UK Singles Chart, number two on the Music Week UK Dance Singles chart and number one on the UK Club Chart.

== Background and release ==
Andy Williams, Carl Thomas, Russ Morgan and Paul Roberts met in a nightclub in Manchester in 1988. They formed production collective K-Klass and debuted with The Wildlife EP in 1990. "Rhythm Is a Mystery" was their follow-up in 1991. The distinctive drum roll which features at various junctures in the track was sampled from the 1987 song "Devotion" by Ten City. First released via Creed Records, it secured K-Klass a contract with Deconstruction. Upon the first release of "Rhythm Is a Mystery", the song only reached No. 61 in the UK. However, after a new remix was re-released that same year, it peaked at No. 3 on the UK Singles Chart. It is their biggest hit to date.

== Critical reception ==
While reviewing the group's 1993 debut album Universal, Dave Simpson from Melody Maker wrote, "Sure, the Walsall groovers were there at the beginning (or thereabouts), bombarding audiences at early 808 State gigs and managed to fuse club credibility and mainstream success with the lusciously gyrating 'Rhythm Is a Mystery', creating a classic of the genre to boot." Roger Morton from NME praised it as "a brazen piano house anthem", remarking that "In the lexicon of British dance pop acts with single consonant prefixes, K Klass are the reliable workhorses next to the thoroughbred M People and the steeplechasing D:Ream." James Hamilton from Record Mirror said, "On a four tracker from the Wrexham/Chester ravers are this plaintive Bobbie Depasois wailed 122.4bpm bubbly cantering bounder, the piano pounded frantiv fluttery 0-126.3-0bpm 'Pianone', brightly bleeping atmospheric 0-126bpm 'I.V.B.M.', and jerkily throbbing and surging 122.7bpm 'Dream' (with a tempoless Nationwide Anglia commercial break!), an instant seller around Manchester."

== Impact and legacy ==
British clubbing magazine Mixmag ranked "Rhythm Is a Mystery" number 34 in its "100 Greatest Dance Singles of All Time" list in 1996. The same year, English DJ Tall Paul named it one of his top 10 tracks, adding, "I think this came out in 1990/91. It's a great song — listen to that piano drop. I remember seeing the place go completely mad to it: you can still easily drop it now and people go mad. An all-time classic." MTV Dance ranked it number 79 in their list of "The 100 Biggest 90's Dance Anthems of All Time" in November 2011. The song was featured in the 1992 comedy film Encino Man.

== Track listings ==
- 7-inch vinyl, UK (1991)

A. "Rhythm Is a Mystery" (Remix Edit) — 3:22
B. "Rhythm Is a Mystery" (Percussion Mix) — 5:28

- 12-inch vinyl, UK (1991)

A1. "Rhythm Is a Mystery" — 4:16
A2. "Pianone" — 5:12
B1. "I.V.B.M." — 5:10
B2. "Dream" — 4:39

- CD single, UK (1991)
1. "Rhythm Is a Mystery" (Remix Edit) — 3:26
2. "Rhythm Is a Mystery" (Remix) — 5:53
3. "Rhythm Is a Mystery" (Percussion Mix) — 5:35
4. "Rhythm Is a Mystery" — 4:16

== Charts ==
=== Weekly charts ===
Chart (1991)	Peak position
Australia (ARIA)	138
Europe (Eurochart Hot 100)	8
Ireland (IRMA)	7
Israel (Israeli Singles Chart)	15
Luxembourg (Radio Luxembourg)	13
UK Singles (Official Charts)	61
UK Singles (Official Charts)	3 (re-release)
UK Airplay (Music Week)	29
UK Dance (Music Week)	2
UK Club Chart (Record Mirror)	1

Chart (1994)	Peak position
Australia (ARIA)	130
UK Club Chart (Music Week)	100

=== Year-end charts ===
Chart (1991)	Position
UK Singles (OCC)	86
UK Club Chart (Record Mirror)	43
