= Humpin' Around =

1992 single by Bobby Brown

Single by Bobby Brown

from the album Bobby
- Released: July 28, 1992
- Studio: Studio LaCoCo, Bosstown Recording (Atlanta, Georgia); Larrabee Sound (West Hollywood, California)
- Genre: New jack swing
- Length: 6:18 (album version); 4:20 (7-inch edit)
- Label: MCA
- Songwriters: Antonio Reid; Kenneth Edmonds; Daryl Simmons; Bobby Brown; Thomas Keyes; Jan C. "Stylz" Styles
- Producers: L.A. Reid; Babyface; Daryl Simmons

Bobby Brown singles chronology
"Word to the Mutha!" (1991)	"Humpin' Around" (1992)	"Good Enough" (1992)
"Two Can Play That Game" (remix) (1995)	"Humpin' Around" (remix) (1995)	"My Prerogative" (remix) (1995)

Music video
- "Humpin' Around" on YouTube

"Humpin' Around" is a song by American singer Bobby Brown. It is produced by L.A. Reid and Babyface. Released in July 1992 by MCA Records, "Humpin' Around" spent two weeks at number one on the US Billboard Hot R&B Singles chart and reached number three on both the Billboard Hot 100 and Cash Box Top 100. Worldwide, the single reached number one in Australia and Canada, number two in New Zealand, and the top 10 in at least nine other countries.

In 1995, British electronic music group K-Klass remixed the song and released it following the success of their remix of Brown's "Two Can Play That Game". This new version saw the song reach the UK top 10 for the first time, peaking at number eight on the UK Singles Chart, and it was also included on Brown's 1995 remix album, Two Can Play That Game.

== Critical reception ==
In 1995, James Hamilton from British magazine Music Week's RM Dance Update described the K-Klass remix as a "three years old hit totally revamped as a superb melodically whined Michael Jackson-ish strider". Gina Morris from Smash Hits gave it three out of five, writing, "No worries, you can't go wrong with luminous feel-good pop and thumping breakbeats. Plus there's loads of funky remixes on the CD too, wheeling the whole thing in at over 30 minutes long. Bargain!"

== Music videos ==
The music video for "Humpin' Around" features Brown dancing outside with women in cages, with cut scenes of a girl trying to break in to his phone and personal belongings to find his mistress in NYC. A second video was shot primarily outside for the dance remix, along with random shots and outtakes from the original video.

== Track listing ==
"Humpin' Around"
No.	Title	Length
1.	"Humpin Around"	6:18
2.	"Humpin' Around" (Dance mix)	6:50
3.	"Humpin Around" (video edit)	4:25
Total length:		17:33

== Personnel ==
- Bobby Brown: lead vocals, songwriter, rap
- Jan C. "Stylz" Styles: songwriter, rap
- Thomas Keyes: songwriter
- Babyface: songwriter, producer, arranger, keyboards, synthesized bass, drum programming, background vocals
- L.A. Reid: songwriter, producer, arranger, drum programming
- Daryl Simmons: songwriter, producer, arranger, background vocals
- Donald Parks: drum programming, MIDI and Synclavier programming
- Emanuel Officer: background vocals

== Charts ==
=== Weekly charts ===
Original version

Chart (1992–1993)	Peak position
Australia (ARIA)	1
Austria (Ö3 Austria Top 40)	7
Belgium (Ultratop 50 Flanders)	10
Belgium (Ultratop 50 Wallonia)	38
Canada Retail Singles (The Record)	1
Canada Top Singles (RPM)	6
Canada Dance/Urban (RPM)	2
Ecuador (UPI)	9
Europe (Eurochart Hot 100)	13
Europe (European Dance Radio)	1
Finland (Suomen virallinen lista)	11
Germany (GfK)	10
Ireland (IRMA)	26
Netherlands (Dutch Top 40)	8
Netherlands (Single Top 100)	8
New Zealand (Recorded Music NZ)	2
Norway (VG-lista)	7
Portugal (AFP)	8
Spain (AFYVE)	5
Sweden (Sverigetopplistan)	5
Switzerland (Schweizer Hitparade)	21
UK Singles (Official Charts)	19
UK Airplay (Music Week)	12
UK Dance (Music Week)	7
UK Club Chart (Music Week)	58
US Billboard Hot 100	3
US Dance Club Songs (Billboard)	15
US Hot R&B/Hip-Hop Songs (Billboard)	1
US Pop Airplay (Billboard)	6
US Rhythmic Airplay (Billboard)	6
US Cash Box Top 100	3

1995 K-Klass remix

Chart (1995)	Peak position
Europe (Eurochart Hot 100)	32
Europe (European Dance Radio)	14
Europe (European Hit Radio)	23
Germany (GfK)	34
Netherlands (Dutch Top 40)	26
Netherlands (Single Top 100)	34
Scottish Singles Sales (Official Charts)	17
UK Singles (Official Charts)	8
UK Dance (Official Charts)	2
UK Airplay (Music Week)	8
UK Pop Tip Club Chart (Music Week)	31

=== Year-end charts ===
Original version

Chart (1992)	Position
Australia (ARIA)	25
Belgium (Ultratop)	73
Canada Top Singles (RPM)	70
Canada Dance/Urban (RPM)	18
Europe (Eurochart Hot 100)	82
Europe (European Dance Radio)	3
Europe (European Hit Radio)	23
Germany (Media Control)	72
Netherlands (Dutch Top 40)	74
Netherlands (Single Top 100)	73
New Zealand (RIANZ)	22
Sweden (Topplistan)	36
US Billboard Hot 100	33
US Hot R&B Singles (Billboard)	38
US Maxi-Singles Sales (Billboard)	24
US Cash Box Top 100	19

=== Decade-end charts ===
Chart (1990–1999)	Position
Canada (Nielsen SoundScan)	85

== Certifications ==
Region	Certification	Certified units/sales
Australia (ARIA)	Gold	35,000^{^}
New Zealand (RMNZ)	Gold	5,000^{*}
United States (RIAA)	Gold	500,000^{^}
^{*} Sales figures based on certification alone.^{^} Shipments figures based on certification alone.

== Release history ==
Region	Version	Date	Format(s)	Label(s)	Ref.
United States	Original	July 22, 1992	Pop radio	MCA	
United States	Original	July 28, 1992	Cassette	MCA	
Australia	Original	August 10, 1992	CD; cassette	MCA	
United Kingdom	Original	August 10, 1992	7-inch vinyl; 12-inch vinyl; CD; cassette	MCA	
United States	Original	August 11, 1992	CD	MCA	
Australia	Original	August 17, 1992	12-inch vinyl	MCA	
Japan	Original	August 26, 1992	Mini-CD	MCA	
United States	Original	September 28, 1992	VHS	MCA	
United Kingdom	K-Klass remix	June 26, 1995	12-inch vinyl; CD; cassette	MCA	
Australia	K-Klass remix	July 31, 1995	CD	MCA	

== See also ==
- List of number-one singles in Australia during the 1990s
- List of number-one R&B singles of 1992 (U.S.)
