= Gotta Let You Go =

Single by Dominica
- Released: 1994
- Genre: Eurodance; house; garage
- Length: 5:29
- Label: Outland Music
- Songwriter: Mohamed Moretta
- Producers: Mohamed Moretta; Mickey Garcia

Dominica singles chronology
"Love String" (1993)	"Gotta Let You Go" (1994)

Music video
- "Gotta Let You Go" on YouTube

"Gotta Let You Go" is a song by American freestyle and house music singer Dominica. Written by Mohamed Moretta and produced by him with Mickey Garcia, it was released in 1994 by Ouland Music. The song received positive reviews from music critics and became a hit in club. On the charts, it became a top-40 hit in the Netherlands and a top-90 hit in Germany, peaking at numbers 34 and 81, in 1995 and 2000. Several music videos has been produced for "Gotta Let You Go". In 2015, Northern Irish electronic music duo Bicep released a remix of the track.

== Critical reception ==
Upon the release, Larry Flick from Billboard magazine wrote, "It was bound to happen. The success of 'Show Me Love' by Robin S. has triggered a flurry of similar-sounding tracks. This is the best of the bunch, thanks mostly to Dominica's easygoing performance and producer/songwriter Mohammed Moretta's chantable hooks. Go for the dance/club version for a lighter, more NRGetic vibe." Maria Jimenez from Music & Media noted that the song is "burning up dancefloors on both sides of the ocean. This is delicious house with a catchy hookline". A reviewer from Music Week gave it a score of four out of five, adding, "It's got punch, panache and the potential to become a big UK favourite, too." Wendi Cermak from The Network Forty praised it as "an excellent dance number".

James Hyman from the Record Mirror Dance Update wrote, "The garage-flavoured track in radio edit form is very commercial, like a cross between Deee-Lite and N-Joi's 'Anthem'. Having already dented the Dutch national charts, with the right push this could do the same in the UK." Another editor, Brad Beatnik, gave it five out of five, commenting, "That infectious 'I gotta let you go, no more sleepless nights' vocal hook (someone please put me out of my frustration and tell me where it's from!) is put to devastating effect on this soon-to-be classic house cut licensed from Holland's Outland label. The piano stabs and thumping beats are currently pounding floors up and down the UK and the corking mixes by DJ Theor & Jaimy, Hyper Go-Go, Electroset and Lolly will only widen its appeal. It's got anthem written all over it." James Hamilton named it a "nasally plaintive Florida girl's maddeningly infectious jiggler with a naggingly familiar lilt" in his weekly RM dance column.

== Impact and legacy ==
British electronic dance and clubbing magazine Mixmag included the song in their list of 'The 30 best vocal house anthems ever' in 2018, writing, "Way before Bicep turned Dominica's 'Gotta Let You Go' into 2015's most rinsed track of the year, 20 years earlier the original cut was a certified club smash. Its appeal is easy to see as well. It manages to blend slightly cheesy pop sensibility with a weighty kick and a dancefloor attitude. All this fire packed into one track is one thing but that's before we've even go to the reason for the song's inclusion in this list, the vocal. Dominica croons about having to break things off with her man. She doesn't want anymore sleepless nights and she needs someone to treat her right. She just wants someone to show her love and to be there for her, she's not going to have heart broken anymore. This is the ultimate empowerment anthem and it's an absolute blinder. Dominica, we hope you found your man because this track has found its way into the hearts of millions."

== Track listing ==
- 12", Europe
1. "Gotta Let You Go" (Club Mix) — 6:23
2. "Gotta Let You Go" (Rub-A-Dub) — 7:50
- 12", US
1. "Gotta Let You Go" (Freestyle Radio Mix) — 3:41
2. "Gotta Let You Go" (Dance Version) — 5:42
3. "Gotta Let You Go" (Instant "Add" Radio Mix) — 4:20
4. "Gotta Let You Go" (Backstage Underground Mix) — 8:44
5. "Gotta Let You Go" (Mixmaster & Jazzvoice Mix) — 4:54
- CD single, UK
1. "Gotta Let You Go" (Original Radio Edit) — 3:36
2. "Gotta Let You Go" (Hyper Go-Go Remix) — 7:29
3. "Gotta Let You Go" (Lolly Remix) — 8:38
4. "Gotta Let You Go" (Electroset Remix) — 7:37
5. "Gotta Let You Go" (Original Club Mix) — 6:22
- CD maxi, Netherlands
1. "Gotta Let You Go" (Radio Edit) — 5:29
2. "Gotta Let You Go" (Club Mix) — 6:22
3. "Gotta Let You Go" (Rub-A-Dub) — 7:49
4. "Gotta Let You Go" (After Midnight Dub) — 7:29

== Charts ==
=== Weekly charts ===
Chart (1994–2000)	Peak position
Germany (GfK)	81
Netherlands (Dutch Top 40)	34
Netherlands (Single Top 100)	40
US Dance Singles Sales (Billboard)	40

=== Year-end charts ===
Chart (1995)	Position
Netherlands (Dutch Top 40)	285
