= Nyasia =

American singer

Blanca Santiago, known as Nyasia (born in West Palm Beach, Florida, United States) is an American singer of Freestyle music and Dance-pop. Nyasia is best remembered for her singles "Now and Forever", "Mimosa" and "Who's Got Your Love", which reached No. 95 on the Billboard Hot 100 chart.

== Discography ==
| Year | Album details |
|---|---|
| 1994 | Nyasia: Released: 1994; Label: Micmac Records |
| 2010 | This Is Me: Released: 2010; Label: Tazmania Records |

== Singles ==
- 1990- NOW & FOREVER
- 1991- WHO'S GOT YOUR LOVE
- 1992- I'M THE ONE
- 1993- MIDNIGHT PASSION
- 1993- DON'T WASTE MY TIME
- 1994- TAKE ME AWAY w/ George Anthony
- 1994- STRONGER TOGETHER w/ David
- 1994- CAN I COUNT ON YOUR LOVE
- 1994- HEAL MY BROKEN HEART
- 1995- TWO TIME LOVER
- 1996- I FEEL THE WAY THAT YOU DO
- 1996- I DON'T WANT YOUR LOVE
- 1996- EL TREN w/ Mentally Disturbed
- 1998- LOVE WAS MEANT TO BE w/ Afro Rican & 2BMF
- 1998- SHAKE IT TO THE RHYTHM
- 2000- MIMOSA 2000
- 2001- TRUE LOVE
- 2003- IF I COULD SEE YOU NOW
- 2005- LOVE & HARMONY
- 2006- FROSTY THE SNOWMAN
- 2008- PHYSICAL ATTRACTION
- 2009- BETRAY
- 2010- NOW & FOREVER (Taz REMIX)
- 2010- 99 1/2 (w/ Wendy)
- 2010- BROKEN HEART w/ Pure Pleazure
- 2010- TELL ME AGAIN
- 2010- I DON'T WANT YOUR LOVE
- 2010- BETRAY
- 2010- WHO'S GOT YOUR LOVE (Taz REMIX)
- 2010- TAKING BACK
- 2010- RECTIFY
- 2010- PHYSICAL ATTRACTION (E.R. REMIX)
- 2010- PLEASE DON'T WAKE ME
- 2010- BROKEN HEART (BrEakAtoN Mix)
- 2010- 99 1/2 (Carlos Mojica EDM Mix)
- 2013- I NEED YOU
- 2014- HEARTBREAKS w/ George Anthony
- 2016- REMEMBER w/ T.S.T.
- 2019- THIS LOVE WILL NEVER BE
- 2021- TIME
- 2022- WALK AWAY w/ T.S.T., Safire & Kenny Diaz
- 2024- WHEN WILL OUR HEARTS BE TOGETHER
- 2024- RUN AWAY w/ Jenni Renee
- 2024- NOW & FOREVER (WITH ONE TOUCH)
- 2025- MIMOSA (NOW & FOREVER) w/ Alok & Dennis
- 2025- MIMOSA (WITH JUST ONE TOUCH) (Artistik Mix)
- 2026- FRAGILE HEART
- 2026- I NEVER LEFT w/ Sharyn Maceren
- 2026- FEVER
