= Prince Regent (1821 packet) =

UK mail packet brig (1821-1827)

History

United Kingdom
- Name: Prince Regent
- Namesake: The Prince Regent
- Launched: 1821, Falmouth, Cornwall
- Fate: Sold 1826

United Kingdom
- Name: HMS Cynthia
- Acquired: 1826 by purchase
- Fate: Wrecked 6 June 1827

General characteristics
- Tons burthen: 226, or 232, or 233 (bm)
- Length: 87 ft 2 in (26.6 m)
- Beam: 25 ft 0 in (7.6 m)
- Armament: 1821: 2 × 9-pounder guns; 1826: 2 × 9-pounder guns + 4 × 9-pounder carronades

Prince Regent was launched at Falmouth, Cornwall in 1821 as a Post Office Packet Service packet. The Royal Navy purchased her in 1826 and renamed her HMS Cynthia. She was wrecked off Barbados on 6 June 1827.

== Career ==
Prince Regent first appeared in Lloyd's Register (LR), in 1822. Her master and owner was J[oseph] White. He was appointed to the Packet Service on 24 September 1821.

On 4 January 1822 Prince Regent was sailing from Penzance to Scilly when a sea struck her. It washed two men (or a woman), off the deck and carried away bulwarks, stanchions, her boat, and more. Prince Regent arrived at Scilly on 8 January.

On 23 October 1821 Prince Regent, Joseph White, master, sailed from Falmouth for the Leeward Islands. She had to put back two days later, and finally sailed on 28 October. She returned on 22 February 1822.

On 14 March 1822 Prince Regent again sailed for the Leeward Islands. She returned on 26 May.

On 8 July 1822 Prince Regent sailed from Falmouth for the Mediterranean. On 18 July she arrived at Gibraltar from Falmouth and Lisbon. She arrived back at Falmouth on 21 September, having left Corfu on 12 August, Malta on 19 August, and Gibraltar on 7 September.

On 10 November Prince Regent again sailed for the Mediterranean. She arrived on 23 December at Corfu and sailed on 29 December for Falmouth. A report from Gibraltar dated 15 February 1823 reported that Prince Regent was one of the vessels that had been stranded there in some gales but that had been got off. She had apparently been sold for 1950 dollars.

On 9 April 1823 Prince Regent, Anderson, master, sailed from Falmouth to Madeira and Brazil. She returned on 13 August.

On 9 September 1823, Prince Regent, Joseph White, master, sailed from Falmouth to Brazil. On 21 January 1824 Prince Regent arrived back from Brazil. On 21 November 1823 she had sailed from Rio de Janeiro.

On 23 June 1824, Prince Regent, under the command of Lieutenant William Lugg (RN; acting), sailed for Brazil, via Madeira. She returned on 11 November 1824.

On 22 April 1825, Prince Regent, under the command of Lieutenant William Lugg (RN; acting), sailed for Jamaica and Cartagena, Colombia.

On 22 August 1825 Prince Regent, White, master, sailed from Falmouth to Buenos Aires and Montevideo. She returned on 26 January 1826.

On 10 February 1826 Prince Regent, Donellan (acting), master, sailed for New York, via Halifax on both the outward and inward bound legs. She arrived back at Falmouth on 5 June 1826.

In 1826 the Royal Navy took over the Post Office Packet Service. The Navy purchased several packet ships, Prince Regent among them. The Admiralty as a matter of policy did not want two different vessels on active duty to share a name so it renamed her because in 1823 the Royal Navy had commissioned the 100-gun First rate HMS Prince Regent.

Lieutenant John White commissioned HMS Cynthia on 10 July 1826 for the Packet Service.

== Fate ==
On 7 May 1827, Cynthia sailed from Falmouth with mails for Barbados, St Vincent, and Jamaica. She was under the command of Lieutenant White, RN.

On 6 June, Cynthia was wrecked on Kendal Point, Barbados. She had sighted Barbados late in the afternoon of 5 June and Lieutenant White decided to lie-to for the night. Still, at one in the morning breakers were sighted close ahead and she ran aground. It proved impossible to get her off during the night and by daybreak it was clear that she was on a reef about two miles off the southern point of the island. She landed her mails but despite attempts by local boats to lighten her, she could not be got off and by mid-afternoon she was flooded, ending all hope of rescuing her. The loss was blamed on an unusually strong current and hazy weather.

All 32 people on board were rescued. HMS Ferret carried the mails from Barbados to Jamaica. Then the survey brig HMS Kangaroo carried them from Jamaica to Falmouth.
