= Tubbs =

Tubbs is a surname. Notable people with the surname include:

- Alfred L. Tubbs, American businessman
- Anthony Tubbs, American lo-fi hip hop rapper known as Rxseboy
- Billy Tubbs, American college basketball coach.
- F. Eugene Tubbs, American politician.
- Greg Tubbs, American Major League Baseball player.
- Hubert Tubbs, American singer with Tower of Power and as solo act
- Irl Tubbs, American college football coach.
- James Tubbs, British instrument bow-maker.
- Jerry Tubbs, American football linebacker.
- Marcus Tubbs, American football defensive tackle.
- Matt Tubbs, English footballer.
- Pierre Tubbs, British songwriter and music producer.
- Ralph Tubbs, British architect.
- Steffan Tubbs, American radio host.
- Stephanie Tubbs Jones, Member of the US House of Representatives from Ohio
- Stewart Tubbs, American communication researcher
- Tony Tubbs, American Boxing Heavyweight champion.
- Winfred Tubbs, American football player.
- Zac Tubbs, American football offensive tackle.

Fictional characters:

- A character in The League of Gentlemen
- Ricardo Tubbs, a character detective in Miami Vice
- Calhoun Tubbs a character on the show In Living Color
- Tubbs Pacer, a criminal family leader from Cars 2

== See also ==
- Tubbs (album), 1961 album by Tubby Hayes
- Tubbs Fire, large wildfire in Northern California, October 2017
- Wash Tubbs the name of a comic strip
