= K-Klass =

British electronica band

- Also known as: Pharmacy Allstars
- Origin: Wrexham, Wales and Chester, England
- Genres: Electronic, house, garage house
- Years active: 1988–present
- Labels: Deconstruction/BMG Records; Parlophone/EMI Records
- Members: Russ Morgan; Paul Roberts; Bobbi Depasois
- Past members: Andy Williams; Carl Thomas

K-Klass are a Welsh/English electronic music group from Wrexham, Wales and Chester, England, who are based in Manchester, England. Its original members were Andy Williams, Carl Thomas, Russ Morgan and Paul Roberts.

In 1991, K-Klass signed with the label Deconstruction Records, scoring five top-40 hits on the UK Singles Chart, and later signed to Parlophone. In the mid-1990s, K-Klass were one of the busiest and most successful remix acts around, remixing the likes of Bobby Brown, Janet Jackson and Luther Vandross, New Order, Rihanna, The Corrs, and Whitney Houston. They were awarded the IDA remixers of the year in 1996 for their mix of Carleen Anderson's "True Spirit", then received a Grammy nomination in 2002 for their remix of Samantha Mumba's "Baby Come on Over". Since leaving Parlophone, Williams and Thomas have both left K-Klass, leaving just Roberts and Morgan alongside original vocalist Bobbi Depasois as K-Klass. Roberts and Morgan run their own record label, Klass Action.

== Career ==
Williams and Thomas teamed up with Morgan and Roberts, from Chester, after meeting at The Haçienda in Manchester during the 1980s. According to Paul Roberts:

We all met at the Hacienda in 1988. We had met before, though. Andy and Carl had done some gigs. Myself and Russ went to see Andy and Carl's band, Interstate play in Chester supporting 808 State. Andy and Carl were already pretty established, but we had no gear at the time - it was basically an SH-101 and a little Tandy mixer. We took about five tracks to Eastern Bloc in Manchester, just to see what they thought. We didn't have a name for the band or anything, and the tracks were just numbers, but they were really keen, and we put it out on a white label. We were playing a lot of live shows at the time, and used to take along boxloads of stuff to sell, and it went down really well.

After recording the Wildlife EP, K-Klass's first hit was "Rhythm Is a Mystery", sung by Bobbi Depasois, and released in 1991. The track reached number 3 on the UK Singles Chart after a re-release the same year and featured prominently in the 1992 film Encino Man.

"Let Me Show You" reached number 13 in 1993. Subsequently, the band purchased a retired Royal Observer Corps underground bunker in Borras for use as a recording studio. They released two albums, Universal, featuring Depasois' vocals, and K2. In 1995, K-Klass won the I.D.A Best International Remixer award, the first UK artist to do so.

K-Klass have played many live events, including stints at nightclubs in Liverpool, Sheffield, Hong Kong and Ibiza as well as the Hollinwoodstock Music Festival in Oldham in 2014.

They have also been involved with producing and remixing tracks by other artists. K-Klass was one of the producers on the Pet Shop Boys album, Bilingual, and have also produced for Candi Staton, Rebekah Ryan, Rosie Gaines and The Corrs. They have remixed tracks by Carleen Anderson, Bobby Brown, Sunscreem, Kylie Minogue, Geri Halliwell, S Club 7 ("Bring It All Back") and M People. Their remix of "Baby Come On Over" by Samantha Mumba was nominated for a Grammy Award in 2002 in the Best Remix category.

Roberts and Morgan appeared on 97.3 Forth One's Friday Night Floorfillers on 22 February 2008, whilst covering for the regular presenter, Krystal.

In 2013, a collaboration with Lempo and Japwow on Applique Music, titled "Brass Attack" was featured on the album Done & Dusted. Also in 2013, the band resurrected their live band performances, adding Pav Chana on live percussion and Dave Clough (aka Davos) on keyboards for live shows.

== Selected discography ==
=== Albums ===
Year	Title	UK	AUS
1993	Universal: Released: December 1993; Labels: Deconstruction, Parlophone	73	140
1998	K2: Released: October 1998; Labels: Parlophone	—	—
2017	K-Klass Presents: House Classics: Released: February 2017; Labels: Static Music	—	—

=== Singles ===
Title	Year	Label	Peak chart positions			
Title	Year	Label	UK	IRL	AUS	US Dance
The Wildlife EP	1990	F.R.O. Records	86	—	—	—
"Rhythm Is a Mystery"	1991	Deconstruction	61	—	—	—
"Rhythm Is a Mystery" (re-release)	1991	Deconstruction	3	7	130	—
"So Right"	1992	Deconstruction	20	19	184	—
"Don't Stop"	1992	Deconstruction	32	—	175	—
"Why"	1992	Deconstruction	—	—	—	—
"Let Me Show You"	1993	Deconstruction / Parlophone	13	22	18	—
"One, Two, Three"	1993	Deconstruction	—	—	—	—
"What You're Missing"	1994	Deconstruction	24	—	107	—
"Burnin'"	1998	Parlophone	45	—	—	—
"Live It Up" (vocals by Tubbs)	1998	Parlophone	—	—	—	—
"Let Me Show You '99"	1999	Klass	172	—	—	—
"Baby Wants to Ride"	2002	Junior London	84	—	—	—
"Footsteps" (with Frances Nero)	2002	suSU	—	—	—	—
"Talk 2 Me" (featuring Kinane)	2002	suSU	85	—	—	9
"Now You're Gone"	2003	suSU	—	—	—	—
"Dance with Me" (featuring Rosie Gaines)	2005	suSU	236	—	—	—

=== Remixes ===
Artist	Title	Album / single
Aqua	"Bumble Bees" (K-Klass Radio Edit)	Bumble Bees
Aqua	"Bumble Bees" (K-Klass Klassic Klub Mix)	Bumble Bees
Atomic Kitten	"Right Now" (K-Klass Phazerphunk Radio Edit)	Right Now
Blondie	"Rapture" (K-Klass Radio Edit)	Beautiful - The Remix Album
Blondie	"Rapture" (K-Klass Klub Mix)	Beautiful - The Remix Album
Bobby Brown	"Two Can Play That Game" (K-Klassic Radio Mix)	Two Can Play That Game
Bobby Brown	"Two Can Play That Game" (K-Klassic Mix)	Two Can Play That Game
Bobby Brown	"Feelin' Inside" (K Klass Klub Mix)	Two Can Play That Game
Carleen Anderson	"Apparently Nothin'" (K-Klassic Mix)	—
Carleen Anderson	"Apparently Nothin'" (Pharmacy Dub)	—
Cher	"All or Nothing" (K-Klass Klub Mix)	Believe
The Corrs	"So Young" (K-Klass Remix)	—
The Corrs	"Lifting Me"(K-Klass mix)	—
Frou Frou	"Must Be Dreaming (K-Klass Ultra Vocal Mix)"	Must Be Dreaming
Geri Halliwell	"Lift Me Up" (K-Klass Phazerphunk Mix)	"Lift Me Up"
Geri Halliwell	"Lift Me Up" (K-Klass Phazerphunk Edit)	"Desire"
Holly Valance	"Naughty Girl" (K-Klass Radio Edit)	—
Janet Jackson / Luther Vandross	"The Best Things in Life Are Free" (K-Klass 7")	—
Janet Jackson / Luther Vandross	"The Best Things in Life Are Free" (K-Klass 12") (CD Version)	—
Janet Jackson / Luther Vandross	"The Best Things in Life Are Free" (K-Klass 12") (Vinyl Version)	—
Kylie Minogue	"Where Is the Feeling?" (K-Klass Klub Mix)	Where Is the Feeling?
Lisa Stansfield	"The Real Thing" (K-Klassic Mix)	Lisa Stansfield
M People	"Love Rendezvous" (K-Klass Klub Mix)	—
New Order	"Ruined in a Day" (K Klass Remix)	—
New Order	"World (Price of Love)" (World in Action Mix)	—
New Order	"World (Price of Love)" (Pharmacy Dub)	—
The Other Two	"Tasty Fish" (K-Klass Klub Mix)	Innocence
The Other Two	"Tasty Fish" (K-Klass Pharmacy Dub)	Innocence
Paul Morrell feat. Mutya Buena	"Give Me Love" (K-Klass Remix)	—
S Club 7	"Bring It All Back" (K-Klass Club mix)	—
Samantha Mumba	"Baby Come On Over" (K-Klass Mix) (nominated for a Grammy Award for Best Remix)	—
