= Cynthia (album) =

Studio album by Cynthia
- Released: October 17, 1990
- Studio: M.G.E.M. Studios ("Change on Me"); Reel Platinum Studios (all others)
- Genre: Freestyle
- Length: 37:00
- Label: Micmac Records
- Producer: Mickey Garcia, Elvin Molina

Cynthia chronology
Cynthia (1990)	Cynthia II (1990)

Cynthia is the debut album of freestyle music singer Cynthia, released 17 October 1990 by Micmac Records. The album includes the singles "Thief of Hearts", "Endless Night" and "Change on Me", the latter reaching No. 37 on the Billboard Hot Dance Music/Club Play chart.

== Track listing ==
- Tracks 1 and 4 written by Cynthia Torres, Elvin Molina, Jean Lauture and Mickey Garcia. Tracks 2 & 5 written by Molina/Lauture/Garcia. Track 3 written by Torres/Lauture/Julian Hernandez. Track 6 written by William Anderson.

No.	Title	Length
1.	"Change on Me"	6:35
2.	"Endless Night"	8:10
3.	"Holding On"	3:59
4.	"Thief of Hearts"	5:55
5.	"Everytime I Look at You"	5:57
6.	"Gonna Get Over You"	6:15

== Personnel ==
- Cynthia: Vocals
- Dave Bellochio: Keyboards
- Julian Hernandez: Guitars
- Bob Allecca: Saxophone

== Production ==
- Arranged, Produced and Mixed by Elvin Molina and Mickey Garcia
- Track 1 recorded by Elvin Molina and Mickey Garcia; all others recorded by Bob Allecca
- Track 1 published by Molina Music, Garcia Music and Scott Allan Music.
- Tracks 2, 4 and 5 published by Molina Music and MicMac Music.
- Track 3 published by MicMac Music.
- Track 6 published by Blue Image.
- All songs ASCAP except track 6 (PRO).

== Charts ==
Singles – Billboard

Year	Single	Record chart	Position
1988	"Change on Me"	Hot Dance Music/Club Play	37
1988	"Change on Me"	Hot Dance Music/Maxi-Singles Sales	43
1989	"Endless Night"	Hot Dance Music/Maxi-Singles Sales	28
1989	"Thief of Hearts"	Hot Dance Music/Maxi-Singles Sales	31
