= That's the Way Love Is (Bobby Brown song) =

1993 single by Bobby Brown

Single by Bobby Brown

from the album Bobby
- Released: April 13, 1993
- Recorded: NJS Future Records
- Length: 4:50
- Label: MCA
- Songwriters: Bobby Brown; Teddy Riley; Aqil Davidson; Demetrius Shipp; Thomas R. Taliaferro
- Producer: Teddy Riley

Bobby Brown singles chronology
"Get Away" (1993)	"That's the Way Love Is" (1993)	"Something in Common" (1993)

"That's the Way Love Is" is a song by American R&B singer Bobby Brown from his third album, Bobby (1992). It was released in April 1993 on the MCA Records label. The official music video for the song was directed by Andy Morahan.

== Track listing ==
1. "That's the Way Love Is" (12-inch extended club version) – 6:47
2. "That's the Way Love Is" (Ragamuffin Dub) – 7:18
3. "That's the Way Love Is" (Guitarappella) – 6:29

== Charts ==
=== Weekly charts ===
Chart (1993)	Peak position
Europe (European Dance Radio)	11
UK Singles (OCC)	56
US Billboard Hot 100	57
US Dance Club Songs (Billboard)	31
US Hot R&B/Hip-Hop Songs (Billboard)	9
US Maxi-Singles Sales (Billboard)	15
US Rhythmic Airplay (Billboard)	32
US Cash Box Top 100	54

=== Year-end charts ===
Chart (1993)	Position
US Hot R&B/Hip-Hop Songs (Billboard)	90
