= Forever (Bobby Brown album) =

Studio album by Bobby Brown
- Released: November 4, 1997
- Recorded: 1997
- Genre: R&B
- Length: 47:29
- Label: MCA
- Producer: Tim & Bob, Fred Rosser, Derek "D.O.A." Allen, Derrick Garrett, Gerald Baillergeau & Victor "Big Yam" Merritt

Bobby Brown chronology
Two Can Play That Game (1995)	Forever (1997)	The Definitive Collection (2006)

Singles from Forever
- 1. "Feelin' Inside" Released: 1997; 2. "My Place" Released: 1998

Forever is the fourth studio album by American singer Bobby Brown. The album's only single, "Feelin' Inside" (music video directed by Scott Kalvert), failed to impact the charts.

== Background ==
The album was recorded after Brown left New Edition's Home Again tour in 1997. Prior to the New Edition reunion, it was rumored Brown was the original choice to play Powerline in Walt Disney Pictures's animated movie, A Goofy Movie, but was cut due to drug problems and was replaced by R&B singer Tevin Campbell, and that some of the songs Bobby did for the movie's soundtrack were revamped and included on Forever. However, Brown was never considered for the role of Powerline. The album was originally titled Bobby II, and was supposed to be produced by veterans of the genre Teddy Riley, Sean Combs, R. Kelly and Jimmy Jam & Terry Lewis.

Professional ratings
Review scores
Source	Rating
Allmusic	2.5/5 stars

== Track listing ==
Credits adapted from liner notes and Allmusic

No.	Title	Writer(s)	Producer(s)	Length
1.	"Nobody Does It Better" (featuring Whitney Houston)	Carole Bayer Sager; Marvin Hamlisch	Kenny Finnel; Bobby Brown	0:52
2.	"It's Still My Thang"	Bobby Brown; Derek Allen; Kenny Finnel	Bobby Brown; Derek "DOA" Allen	5:40
3.	"Feelin' Inside"	Felicia "F-Sharpe" Jefferson; Brown; Fred Rosser; Derrick Garrett	Derrick Garrett; Jeff Redd	4:09
4.	"She's All I Need"	Brown; Allen	Bobby Brown; Derek "DOA" Allen	4:28
5.	"My Place"	Tim Kelley; Bob Robinson; Brown	Tim and Bob; Bobby Brown (co.)	4:57
6.	"Been Around the World"	Kelley; Robinson	Tim and Bob	4:50
7.	"Give It Up"	Brown; Gerald Baillergeau; Victor Merritt; Jerome Woods	Bobby Brown; Gerald Baillergeau	4:31
8.	"Happy Days"	Allen; Brown	Derek "DOA" Allen; Bobby Brown	4:30
9.	"Forever"	Kelley; Robinson	Tim and Bob	4:43
10.	"Sunday Afternoon"	Brown; Allen; Finnel	Bobby Brown; Derek "DOA" Allen	5:04
11.	"Heart and Soul"	Brown; Baillergeau; Merritt; Woods	Bobby Brown; Gerald Baillergeau	3:45

== Charts ==
Chart (1997–98)	Peak position
Australian Albums (ARIA)	105
Japanese Albums (Oricon)	27
U.S. Billboard 200	61
U.S. Billboard Top R&B Albums	15
