= Bobby (Bobby Brown album) =

Studio album by Bobby Brown
- Released: August 25, 1992
- Recorded: 1991–1992
- Genres: R&B; hip hop; new jack swing
- Length: 71:27
- Label: MCA
- Producers: Antonio "L.A." Reid; Kenneth "Babyface" Edmonds; Daryl Simmons; Teddy Riley; Demetrius Shipp; Thomas R. Taliaferro Jr.; Derek "DOA" Allen; Dennis Austin; BeBe Winans

Bobby Brown chronology
| Don't Be Cruel (1988) | Bobby (1992) | B.Brown Posse (1993) |

Singles from Bobby
- 1. "Humpin' Around" Released: July 28, 1992; 2. "Good Enough" Released: October 1992; 3. "Get Away" Released: January 5, 1993; 4. "That's the Way Love Is" Released: April 13, 1993; 5. "Something in Common" Released: December 7, 1993; 6. "Two Can Play That Game" Released: 25 June 1994 / 1 April 1995

Professional ratings
Review scores
| Source | Rating |
|---|---|
| AllMusic | 3/5 stars |
| Calgary Herald | C |
| Christgau's Consumer Guide | (choice cut) |
| Orlando Sentinel | 1/3 stars |
| Rolling Stone | 2/5 stars |

Bobby is the third studio album by American singer Bobby Brown, released in 1992 by MCA Records. The album continued the R&B/new jack swing sound of its predecessor, Don't Be Cruel. Babyface, L.A. Reid, and Daryl Simmons returned as producers and songwriters, however, Brown also worked with other producers, most notably Teddy Riley, who was considered a pioneer of the new jack swing genre. Riley also co-wrote and produced the majority of the album. Brown had more creative input and control of the album, becoming an executive producer and co-writing seven of the album's thirteen songs. The album received mixed reviews from music critics.

Bobby peaked at number two on the US Billboard 200 Album Chart and spawned three major US Billboard Hot 100 singles; "Humpin' Around" (US #3), "Good Enough" (US #7), and " Get Away" (US #14). The album also reached number one on the Billboard R&B Albums chart, and reached the top 10 in Australia, New Zealand, and Sweden. The album also included a duet, "Something in Common", with Brown's wife, singer Whitney Houston, that became a hit in several international markets.

Brown received his second Grammy Award nomination for Best Male R&B Vocal Performance at the 35th Grammy Awards for the single "Humpin' Around", however, he did not win. The album was certified double platinum by the Recording Industry Association of America (RIAA) on February 19, 1993.

== Track listing ==
| No. | Title | Writer(s) | Producer(s) | Length |
|---|---|---|---|---|
| 1. | "Humpin' Around" (Prelude) | | | 0:10 |
| 2. | "Humpin' Around" | L.A. Reid; Babyface; Daryl Simmons; Bobby Brown; Thomas Keyes; Jan C. "Stylz" Styles | Reid; Babyface; Simmons | 6:18 |
| 3. | "Two Can Play That Game" | Teddy Riley; Bernard Belle; David "Redhead" Guppy; Brown | Riley | 4:59 |
| 4. | "Get Away" | Riley; Belle; Tony Haynes; Brown; Louil Silas Jr. | Riley | 5:10 |
| 5. | "Til the End of Time" | Riley; Demetrius Shipp Jr.; William "Rakim" Griffin | Riley; Shipp (co.) | 5:20 |
| 6. | "Good Enough" | Reid; Babyface; Simmons | Reid; Babyface; Simmons | 5:01 |
| 7. | "Pretty Little Girl" | Reid; Babyface; Simmons | Reid; Babyface; Simmons | 5:09 |
| 8. | "Lovin' You Down" | Riley; Thomas R. Taliaferro Jr. | Riley; Taliaferro (co.) | 5:50 |
| 9. | "One More Night" | Riley; Herb Middleton; Belle | Riley | 6:28 |
| 10. | "Something in Common" (duet with Whitney Houston) | Riley; Brown; Belle; Houston | Riley | 4:59 |
| 11. | "That's the Way Love Is" | Riley; Shipp; Aqil Davidson; Brown | Riley; Shipp (co.) | 4:50 |
| 12. | "College Girl" | Brown; Derek "DOA" Allen | Brown; Allen | 6:05 |
| 13. | "Storm Away" | Brown; Dennis Austin; Kelvin Bowers | Brown; Austin | 6:05 |
| 14. | "I'm Your Friend" (duet with Debra Winans) | BeBe Winans | Winans | 5:03 |
| Total length: | | | | 71:27 |

Sample credits

- "Humpin' Around" contains a chorus sample of "Dancing Days", written by Jimmy Page and Robert Plant, and performed by Led Zeppelin; a sample riff of "Rock Steady", written and performed by Aretha Franklin; a sample riff of "Bang Zoom (Let's Go-Go)", written by Full Force, Howard Thompson, Adelaida Martinez and U.T.F.O., and performed by The Real Roxanne featuring Howie Tee; and a bass sample of "The Grunt"; written and performed by The J.B.'s.
- "Two Can Play That Game" contains a sample riff of "Sing a Simple Song", written by Sylvester Stewart, and performed by Sly & the Family Stone.
- "Get Away" contains a chorus sample of "(Not Just) Knee Deep", written by George Clinton, and performed by Funkadelic; a sample riff of "Kool is Back", written by Gene Redd, Jimmy Crosby, Ronald Bell, Claydes C. Smith, George Brown, Donald Boyce, Robert Mickens, Dennis Thomas, Robert "Kool" Bell and Richard Westfield, and performed by Funk, Inc.; and a sample riff of "Spend the Night", written by Teddy Riley, Gene Griffin and Aaron Hall, and performed by Guy.
- "One More Night" contains a sample riff of "School Boy Crush", written by Roger Ball, Malcolm Duncan, Steven Ferrone, Alan Gorrie, Owen McIntyre and Hamish Stuart, and performed by Average White Band.
- "Something in Common" contains a sample riff of "Want to Be With You", written by Gene Griffin and William Aquart, and performed by Zan.
- "That's the Way Love Is" contains a sample riff of "I Get Lifted", written by Harry Wayne Casey and Richard Finch, and performed by KC & the Sunshine Band.

== Personnel ==
Musicians

- Bobby Brown – lead vocals, rap (2), background vocals (12, 13)
- Derek "DOA" Allen – guitar, drums, and background vocals (12)
- Dennis Austin – keyboards, drums, and background vocals (13)
- Ricky Bell – background vocals (7)
- Bernard Belle – background vocals (3–5, 8–11)
- Sophia Bender – background vocals (13)
- Trina Broussard – background vocals (12, 13)
- Mary Brown – background vocals (3–5, 8–11)
- Robbie Buchanan – additional keyboards (14)
- Cedric Caldwell – arrangements, keyboards, and synthesizers (14)
- Omar Chandler – background vocals (3–5, 8–11)
- Aqil Davidson – rap (11)
- Nathan East – bass (14)
- Kenneth "Babyface" Edmonds – instruments and background vocals (2, 6, 7)
- Robert Gonzales – background vocals (12)
- Chauncey Hannibal – background vocals (3–5, 8–11)
- Whitney Houston – lead vocals (10), background vocals (6)
- Nate Hughes – percussion and low BDB (13)
- Paul Jackson Jr. – guitar (14)
- Debra Killings – background vocals (7)
- Ricky Lawson – Remo Drums, Akai MPCBD, and shaker (14)
- Levi Little – background vocals (3–5, 8–11)
- Danny Lemelle – saxophone (12, 13)
- Marsha McClurkin – background vocals (3–5, 8–11)
- Terry McMillan – percussion (14)
- Chanté Moore – background vocals (6)
- Emanuel Officer – background vocals (2, 6, 7)
- Donald Parks – programming (2, 6, 7)
- Antonio "L.A." Reid – instruments (2, 6, 7)
- "Big" Dave Repace – keyboards and background vocals (12)
- Teddy Riley – instruments and background vocals (3–5, 8–11)
- Daryl "DeRock" Simmons – background vocals (2, 7)
- Huston Singletary – keyboard and drum programming (12)
- Joseph Stonestreet – background vocals (3–5, 8–11)
- Stylz – rap (2)
- Angie Winans – background vocals (14)
- BeBe Winans – background vocals (14)
- CeCe Winans – background vocals (14)
- Debra Winans – lead and background vocals (14)

Technical and artistic personnel

- Dale Abbott – assistant engineer (13)
- Derek DOA" Allen – mixing (12)
- Dave Aron – mixing (6)
- Jeff Balding – engineer and mixing (14)
- Ronnie Brookshire – engineer (14)
- Bobby Brown – executive producer, mixing (12)
- Tommy Brown – executive producer
- Milton Chan – mixing (6)
- Keith "KC" Cohen – mixing (7)
- John Coulter – design
- Franklyn Grant – assistant engineer (3–5, 8–11)
- Todd Gray – photography
- Bernie Grundman – mastering
- Jean-Marie Horvat – engineer and mixing (3–5, 8–11)
- Kimm James – mixing (7)
- Tony "TK" Kidd – mixing (12)
- Patrick Kelly – assistant engineer (14)
- Ted Malia – assistant engineer (13)
- Mike McCarthy – engineer (14)
- George Pappas – engineer (13)
- Kenny Parkere – mixing assistant (12)
- Barney Perkins – engineer (2, 6, 7), mixing (6)
- Bret Perry – assistant engineer (14)
- Neal H Pogue – engineer (12, 13), mixing (13)
- Mike Poole – engineer (14)
- Teddy Riley – mixing (3–5, 8–11)
- John Rogers – engineer (2, 6, 7)
- Thom Russo – mixing (2)
- Louil Silas Jr. – executive producer
- Matt Still – assistant engineer (13)
- Carry Summers – assistant engineer (14)
- Phil Tan – assistant engineer (12, 13)
- Earl Thomas – assistant engineer (3–5, 8–11)
- Louis Upkins, Jr. – production assistant (14)
- Vartan – art direction
- Albert Watson – photography
- Dave Way – mixing (2)
- Billy Whittington – engineer (14)
- Rick Will – engineer (14)
- Keston Wright – assistant engineer (3–5, 8–11)
- Jim "Z" Zumpano – engineer (2, 6, 7)

== Charts ==
=== Weekly charts ===
| Chart (1992–1993) | Peak position |
|---|---|
| Australian Albums (ARIA) | 2 |
| Austrian Albums (Ö3 Austria) | 26 |
| Canada Top Albums/CDs (RPM) | 4 |
| Dutch Albums (Album Top 100) | 15 |
| European Albums (Music & Media) | 16 |
| German Albums (Offizielle Top 100) | 12 |
| Greek Albums (Pop & Rock) | 10 |
| Hungarian Albums (MAHASZ) | 24 |
| Japanese Albums (Oricon) | 4 |
| New Zealand Albums (RMNZ) | 5 |
| Swedish Albums (Sverigetopplistan) | 4 |
| Swiss Albums (Schweizer Hitparade) | 18 |
| UK Albums (Official Charts) | 11 |
| US Billboard 200 | 2 |
| US Top R&B/Hip-Hop Albums (Billboard) | 1 |

=== Year-end charts ===
| Chart (1992) | Position |
|---|---|
| Australian Albums (ARIA) | 76 |
| Canada Top Albums/CDs (RPM) | 41 |
| European Albums (Music & Media) | 86 |
| Japanese Albums (Oricon) | 74 |
| Swedish Albums (Sverigetopplistan) | 53 |
| US Billboard 200 | 82 |
| US Top R&B/Hip-Hop Albums (Billboard) | 42 |

| Chart (1993) | Position |
|---|---|
| US Billboard 200 | 52 |
| US Top R&B/Hip-Hop Albums (Billboard) | 23 |

== Certifications ==
| Region | Certification | Certified units/sales |
|---|---|---|
| Australia (ARIA) | Gold | 35,000^{^} |
| Canada (Music Canada) | Platinum | 100,000^{^} |
| Japan (RIAJ) | Platinum | 200,000^{^} |
| United States (RIAA) | 2× Platinum | 2,000,000^{^} |
^{^} Shipments figures based on certification alone.

== See also ==
- List of number-one R&B albums of 1992 (U.S.)
