= Johnny Ortiz =

American musician

Johnny O
- Born: Juan Ortiz; Brooklyn, New York, U.S.
- Origin: Hebrew, Puerto Rican and Cuban
- Genres: Dance, Latin freestyle, R&B, pop, electronic
- Occupations: Singer, songwriter, record producer
- Years active: 1988–present
- Labels: MicMac, Ex-It, ZYX

Johnny O (born Juan Ortiz in Brooklyn, New York) is an American freestyle and dance-pop singer. He reached the Billboard charts in the late 1980s with the singles "Fantasy girl", "Memories" and "Runaway Love".

== Discography ==
=== Studio albums ===
- 1989: Johnny O
- 1990: Like a Stranger
- 1995: Call It Watcha Like
- 2002: The Sounds of My Heart
- 2007: Peace on Earth 2012
- 2011: Remedy (Grace of God)

=== Compilation albums ===
- 1993: The Remixes
- 1997: Best of Johnny O
- 2001: Johnny O's Greatest Hits
- 2003: Famous Very Words: The Very Best of Johnny O
- 2005: All the Hits and More!

== Singles ==
Title	Year	Peak chart positions	
Title	Year	US	US Dance Singles
"Fantasy Girl"	1988	—	48
"Highways of Love"	1989	—	—
"Memories"	1989	—	37
"Megamix"	1990	—	—
"Dreamboy/Dreamgirl"	1990	53	17
"We Can't Go On This Way"	1991	—	—
"I Just Wanna Get to Know You (If It's Alright with You)"	1991	—	—
"I Wanna Make Love 2 U"	1992	—	—
"I Love You"	1992	—	—
"The Music's Got Me"	1993	—	—
"Runaway Love"	1993	87	4
"Freestyle"	1994	—	—
"I Know That You Love Me"	1995	—	—
"Love Letters"	1996	—	—
"Diana"	2002	—	—
"Take Me Through the Night"	2003	—	—
"King of Kings / Scream"	2007	—	—
"My World"	2010	—	"—" denotes release that has not charted.
