= Something in Common =

1993 single by Bobby Brown and Whitney Houston

Single by Bobby Brown and Whitney Houston

from the album Bobby
- Released: December 7, 1993
- Studio: NJS Future Records (Virginia Beach, Virginia); Studio LaCoCo (Atlanta, Georgia)
- Genre: Swingbeat; soul
- Length: 4:59 (album version); 4:23 (radio edit)
- Label: MCA
- Songwriters: Whitney Houston; Bobby Brown; Teddy Riley; Bernard Belle; Mark Middleton; Alfred Rosemond
- Producers: Teddy Riley; L.A. Reid (remix)

Bobby Brown singles chronology
"That's the Way Love Is" (1993)	"Something in Common" (1993)	"Two Can Play That Game" (1994)

Whitney Houston singles chronology
"Queen of the Night" (1993)	"Something in Common" (1993)	"Exhale (Shoop Shoop)" (1995)

Music video
- "Something in Common" on YouTube

"Something in Common" is a song by American singers Bobby Brown and then-wife Whitney Houston, that was featured on Brown's third album, Bobby (1992). The single version was re-recorded and released in December 1993, by MCA Records, and was also available on Brown's 1993 compilation album Remixes in the Key of B.

It was written by Brown and Houston with Teddy Riley, Bernard Belle, Mark Middleton and Alfred Rosemond, while Riley and L.A. Reid produced it. The song stands as the couple's first musical collaboration and the only song released as a single. It examines two unlikely people coming together as they find "something in common." The accompanying music video was directed by Andy Morahan, featuring Brown and Houston performing in and by a swimming pool.

== Background and recording ==
Houston and Brown both attended the 3rd Annual Soul Train Music Awards on March 3, 1989. At the time, the two artists were among the most popular recording artists in both pop and R&B.

Following their first meeting, Houston invited Brown to attend her 26th birthday party at her mansion in Mendham Township, New Jersey that August. Though Houston was dating comedic actor Eddie Murphy at the time, she and then 20-year-old Brown formed a close friendship.

Months later, according to Houston, while attending another birthday party for her friend, gospel artist CeCe Winans, in October 1989, Brown reportedly asked Houston out on a date to which the singer accepted. By the spring of 1991, Houston and Brown's relationship had turned serious and on July 18, 1992, after a nine-month engagement, the couple married and held an extravagant wedding at Houston's mansion.

At the time, the couple's pairing, which was confirmed after first being spotted together after attending an awards banquet for Ebony's American Black Achievement Awards, was viewed as an odd pairing due to the artists' different reputations. Some media outlets argued that the stars' marriage was possibly put together due to how both singers were perceived at the time, claims the two stars denied.

Brown began recording material for his third studio album with producer Teddy Riley. During one session, Houston came by to visit and the couple often would leave the studio to smoke cigarettes, much to Riley's chagrin. Annoyed, the producer argued for the couple to come back to the studio, complaining, "man, y'all two got something in common."

Immediately afterward, however, Riley and his frequent collaborator Bernard Belle came up with the rough draft of the song "Something in Common" and asked Houston and Brown to record the song as a duet. The couple agreed if only they could contribute to the song, to which Riley and Belle agreed. As a result, both Brown and Houston composed their own lyrics for the song.

== Release ==
"Something in Common" was featured on Brown's third studio album, Bobby, which was released on August 25, 1992, over a month after Brown married Houston. It became the fifth official single released from the album on December 7, 1993.

=== Critical reception ===
Larry Flick from Billboard magazine felt the song is "actually quite sweet, and good fun ... not to mention a viable radio contender." Troy J. Augusto from Cashbox named it Pick of the Week, declaring it as "quite a catchy number thanks to the always reliable production skills of Teddy Riley as well as LA. Reid's remix and the duo's pleasant delivery." He also complimented it as a "happy, positive cut". David Browne from Entertainment Weekly noted that here, Brown "coos to his new bride, Whitney Houston, in a bouncy duet". Pan-European magazine Music & Media wrote, "'My Maaaaaan', Whitney sings proudly on a thundering swingbeat. 'Giiiiiiiirl', Bobby replies passionately, and together they sing about their much-publicised happy marriage. Baby "Bobbi" joins in on the video only."

Alan Jones from Music Week gave it a score of three out of five, saying, "This shuffling jackswing/soul number draws fine vocal performances from the husband and wife team and is the commercial highlight of Brown's album." The Network Forty named it "a wonderful uptempo track", noting that "the electric vocals of Houston and Brown gives an urban edge to their strong dance and pop base." People Magazine felt it's "destined to be a much scrutinized cut", describing it as an "up-from-the-streets echo" of Steve Lawrence and Eydie Gorme. James Hamilton from the Record Mirror Dance Update called it "pleasant" in his weekly dance column. Mark Frith from Smash Hits was less enthustiastic, giving the song two out of five and calling it "a very average slice of swing beat. It's one of those records where the video will be more interesting than the song."

=== Chart performance ===
The song was released as a single track in the United Kingdom, where it debuted and peaked at number 16 for the week of January 16, 1994. Although the song and its music video received moderate rotation in the United States, "Something in Common" was not released as a commercial single and was ineligible to chart on the Billboard Hot 100 and Hot R&B Singles charts; however, it peaked at numbers 32 and 30 on the Hot 100 Airplay and Hot R&B Airplay lists, respectively. It reached its highest Billboard chart peak on its Pop Airplay chart at number 12.

== Music video ==
The official music video for "Something in Common" was directed by British commercial, film and music video director Andy Morahan.

It was filmed at Brown's mansion in Alpharetta, Georgia and features Brown and Houston performing in or by a swimming pool. Other scenes shows Houston in the backseat of a limousine, Brown on a boat, and the couple together at a barbeque with guests and also atop the roof of a building.

The video also features their infant daughter, Bobbi Kristina Brown.

== Live performances ==
During some stops on both Brown's Humpin' Around the World Tour (1992-1993) and Houston's The Bodyguard World Tour (1993-1994), the couple would perform the song together.

At the 1994 Soul Train Music Awards on March 15, 1994, the couple performed the song together five years after they had first met at the same awards show in the same venue.

Nine years later, in May 2003, the couple performed the song during VH1 Divas Duets along with their modest R&B hit "My Love" from Houston's platinum-selling Just Whitney album.

== Accolades ==
In 2014, Billboard magazine ranked the song the 13th best love song recorded by a real-life musical couple. In 2023, Yardbarker ranked the duet as one of the 25 best R&B duets of all time.

== Track listing ==
1. "Something in Common" (Radio edit) - 4:25
2. "Something in Common" (Original album version) – 4:59
3. "Something in Common" (Extended vocal version) – 6:55
4. "Something in Common" (Quiet Storm version) – 4:38
5. "Something in Common" (Dub version) – 6:28
6. "Something in Common" (LA Reid Remix) – 6:46
7. "Something in Common" (Second LA Reid Remix) – 7:00

== Credits ==
- Executive Producer – Bobby Brown, Louil Silas Jr., Tommy Brown
- Piano – Bo Watson
- Producer – Teddy Riley
- Remix – L.A. Reid

== Charts ==
=== Weekly charts ===
Chart (1993–1994)	Peak position
Australia (ARIA)	82
Canada Top Singles (RPM)	26
Canada Contemporary Hit Radio (The Record)	19
Europe (Eurochart Hot 100)	51
Europe (European AC Radio)	11
Europe (European Dance Radio)	2
Europe (European Hit Radio)	16
Germany (GfK)	58
Netherlands (Dutch Top 40)	36
Netherlands (Single Top 100)	40
New Zealand (RIANZ)	33
Quebec (ADISQ)	36
Switzerland (Schweizer Hitparade)	41
UK Singles (Official Charts)	16
UK Airplay (Music Week)	3
UK Dance (Music Week)	16
UK Club Chart (Music Week)	63
US Radio Songs (Billboard)	32
US R&B/Hip-Hop Airplay (Billboard)	30
US Pop Airplay (Billboard)	12
US Rhythmic Airplay (Billboard)	30

=== Year-end charts ===
Chart (1994)	Position
UK Singles (OCC)	191

== Release history ==
Region	Date	Format(s)	Label(s)	Ref.
United States	December 7, 1993	—N/a	MCA	
United Kingdom	January 10, 1994	7-inch vinyl; 12-inch vinyl; CD; cassette	MCA	
Australia	March 14, 1994	CD; cassette	MCA	
Japan	April 21, 1994	CD	MCA	
