= Good Enough (Bobby Brown song) =

1992 single by Bobby Brown

Single by Bobby Brown

from the album Bobby
- Released: September 29, 1992
- Genre: R&B
- Length: 5:01
- Label: MCA
- Songwriters: Kenneth Edmonds; Antonio Reid; Daryl Simmons
- Producers: Kenneth Edmonds; Antonio Reid; Daryl Simmons

Bobby Brown singles chronology
"Humpin' Around" (1992)	"Good Enough" (1992)	"Get Away" (1993)

Music video
- "Good Enough" on YouTube

"Good Enough" is a song performed by American contemporary R&B singer Bobby Brown; issued by MCA Records as the second single from his third studio album, Bobby (1992). The song is both written and produced by Kenneth Edmonds, Antonio Reid and Daryl Simmons. It peaked at number seven on the US Billboard Hot 100 in 1992, his final top-10 hit in the United States. The accompanying music video was directed by Scott Kalvert.

== Charts ==
=== Weekly charts ===
Weekly chart performance for "Good Enough"
Chart (1992)	Peak position
Australia (ARIA)	39
Belgium (Ultratop 50 Flanders)	45
Germany (GfK)	49
Netherlands (Single Top 100)	36
New Zealand (Recorded Music NZ)	13
Sweden (Sverigetopplistan)	38
UK Singles (Official Charts)	41
UK Airplay (Music Week)	20
UK Dance (Music Week)	25
US Billboard Hot 100	7
US Hot Dance Music/Maxi-Singles Sales (Billboard)	10
US Hot R&B/Hip-Hop Singles & Tracks (Billboard)	5
US Rhythmic Top 40 (Billboard)	6
US Top 40 Mainstream (Billboard)	5
US Cash Box Top 100	7

=== Year-end charts ===
Year-end chart performance for "Good Enough"
Chart (1993)	Position
US Cash Box Top 100	25

== Certifications ==
Certifications for "Good Enough"
Region	Certification	Certified units/sales
United States (RIAA)	Gold	500,000^{^}
^{^} Shipments figures based on certification alone.
