= Get Away (Bobby Brown song) =

1993 single by Bobby Brown

Single by Bobby Brown

from the album Bobby
- Released: January 5, 1993
- Recorded: February 1992
- Genre: R&B, new jack swing
- Length: 5:10 (album version); 4:36 (radio edit)
- Label: MCA
- Songwriters: Bernard Belle, Bobby Brown, Louis Silas Jr., Teddy Riley, Tony Haynes
- Producer: Teddy Riley

Bobby Brown singles chronology
"Good Enough" (1992)	"Get Away" (1993)	"That's the Way Love Is" (1993)

"Get Away" is a song performed and co-written by American singer Bobby Brown, issued as the third single from his third album, Bobby (1992). In 1993, the song peaked at number 14 on the US Billboard Hot 100, as well as reaching number one on the Billboard dance chart. It was also Brown's last song to chart on the Top 40 in the United States. The official music video for the song was directed by Fatima Robinson.

== Charts ==
=== Weekly charts ===
Chart (1993)	Peak position
Europe (European Dance Radio)	14
Netherlands (Dutch Top 40 Tipparade)	10
Netherlands (Single Top 100)	97
New Zealand (Recorded Music NZ)	23
US Billboard Hot 100	14
US Dance Club Songs (Billboard)	3
US Dance Singles Sales (Billboard)	1
US Hot R&B/Hip-Hop Songs (Billboard)	3
US Pop Airplay (Billboard)	17
US Rhythmic Airplay (Billboard)	8
US Cash Box Top 100	13

=== Year-end charts ===
Chart (1993)	Position
US Hot R&B/Hip-Hop Singles & Tracks (Billboard)	33
