= Two Can Play That Game (song) =

1994 single by Bobby Brown

Single by Bobby Brown

from the album Bobby
- Released: June 13, 1994
- Studio: NJS Future Records (Virginia Beach, Virginia)
- Genre: New jack swing (original version); house (K Klassic mix)
- Length: 4:59 (album version); 3:31 (K Klassic radio mix)
- Label: MCA
- Songwriters: Teddy Riley; Bernard Belle; David "Redhead" Guppy; Bobby Brown
- Producer: Teddy Riley

Bobby Brown singles chronology
"Something in Common" (1993)	"Two Can Play That Game" (1994)	"Humpin' Around" (K-Klass remix) (1995)

"Two Can Play That Game" is a song by American R&B singer-songwriter Bobby Brown from his third album, Bobby (1992). The single release was remixed by K-Klass and originally reached No. 38 on the UK Singles Chart in June 1994. In April 1995, it re-entered the chart, peaking at No. 3. It received positive reviews from music critics and also reached No. 3 in the Netherlands. Additionally, it became a top-20 hit in Belgium (Flanders and Wallonia), Denmark, Finland, Ireland, and Italy. On the Eurochart Hot 100, "Two Can Play That Game" peaked at No. 10. This version of the song appeared on Brown's remix album of the same name, released later in 1995.

== Critical reception ==
Larry Flick from Billboard magazine remarked that "Two Can Play That Game" had been "revamped brilliantly" by the "unstoppable" British electronic music group K-Klass. In his weekly UK chart commentary, James Masterton noted that the track had been "drastically remixed", becoming a record "that towers head and shoulders over the original mix." He added, "Whereas the original album track was a fairly average piece of swingbeat, K-Klass' reworking transforms it into one of the more brilliant pop hits of recent months." Andy Beevers from Music Week gave the remix a score of four out of five, stating that "their catchy and commercial piano-powered treatment has helped take the tune to the upper reaches of the Club Chart." Johnny Dee from NME complimented the remixers, that "do a sterling job". He added, "It's pretty smart until he starts rapping about how he's back and how brilliant he is but yer can't help feeling he's lost his moment."

People Magazine stated that it had the same potential to become a No. 1 R&B hit as "Humpin' Around". Ralph Tee from the RM Dance Update wrote, "With K-Klass on the mix, the track now boasts sparkling pianos, bright snares, thudding house bassline and crispy handclaps as an accompaniment to parts of the original vocal that at times seems removed from its surroundings. After breaking down for a rap section atop some contrasting funky drummer style rhythms, the track is then left to build once again to a storming climax." He also added that it "looks like [becoming] Bobby's first house hit." Another RM editor, James Hamilton, described it as "piano plonked [and] jiggly striding" in his weekly dance column.

== Impact and legacy ==
In October 2018, Time Out ranked "Two Can Play That Game" at No. 30 in their "The 100 Best Party Songs" list, adding:

"We don’t know who the harlot was that broke Bobby’s heart, but we’re glad she did. In cooking up a dish of sweet revenge, Boston’s Robert Brown unwittingly created one of the biggest party tunes of all time. The track may have started out as a smooth R&B gem, but less than a year after its release it was transformed by Welsh producers K-Klass into the piano house banger we’ve all been doing the running man to ever since."

== Track listing ==
1. "Two Can Play That Game" (K Klassic radio mix) – 3:31
2. "Two Can Play That Game" (K Klassic mix) – 7:17
3. "Two Can Play That Game" (The Games Over mix) – 5:18
4. "Two Can Play That Game" (Pharmaceutical dub) – 6:22
5. "Two Can Play That Game" (DJ Gem Cunnington ReMix) – 3:29
6. "Two Can Play That Game" (2B3 Can Play That Game mix) – 4:45

== Charts ==
=== Weekly charts ===
Chart (1994)	Peak position
Scotland Singles (OCC)	68
UK Singles (OCC)	38
UK Airplay (Music Week)	40
UK Dance (Music Week)	3
UK Club Chart (Music Week)	4

Chart (1995)	Peak position
Australia (ARIA)	125
Belgium (Ultratop 50 Flanders)	15
Belgium (Ultratop 50 Wallonia)	12
Denmark (IFPI)	18
Europe (Eurochart Hot 100)	10
Europe (European Dance Radio)	4
Europe (European Hit Radio)	9
Finland (IFPI)	19
Ireland (IRMA)	7
Italy (Musica e dischi)	4
Italy Airplay (Music & Media)	1
Netherlands (Dutch Top 40)	3
Netherlands (Single Top 100)	5
Scotland Singles (OCC)	4
Sweden (Sverigetopplistan)	25
UK Singles (OCC)	3
UK Dance (OCC)	4
UK Hip Hop/R&B (OCC)	1
UK Airplay (Music Week)	1
UK Pop Tip Club Chart (Music Week)	6

=== Year-end charts ===
Chart (1994)	Position
UK Club Chart (Music Week)	97

Chart (1995)	Position
Belgium (Ultratop 50 Wallonia)	62
Europe (Eurochart Hot 100)	76
Latvia (Latvijas Top 50)	144
Netherlands (Dutch Top 40)	33
Netherlands (Single Top 100)	64
UK Singles (OCC)	23
UK Airplay (Music Week)	2
UK Pop Tip Club Chart (Music Week)	11

== Certifications ==
Region	Certification	Certified units/sales
United Kingdom (BPI)	Platinum	600,000^{‡}
^{‡} Sales+streaming figures based on certification alone.

== Release history ==
Region	Date	Format(s)	Label(s)	Ref.
United Kingdom	June 13, 1994	12-inch vinyl; CD; cassette	MCA	
United Kingdom (re-release)	March 20, 1995	12-inch vinyl; CD; cassette	MCA	
Australia	May 22, 1995	CD	MCA	
Australia	May 29, 1995	Cassette	MCA	
