= SPG Records =

SPG Records was an independent Toronto dance record label of the 1990s up to 2010. The label mainly produced Canadian house and dance compilations.

Two of SPG's best selling compilation series were the alternative rock collections: Hardest Hits (Vols. 1-5), and Classic Alternatives (Vols. 1-3).

== Records ==
Sound of the Underground

Compilation album
- Released: 1994
- Genre: House music
- Label: SPG Records

Sound of the Underground compilation 1994

1. Work It To The Bone - LNR
2. City Streets - Basil Hardhouse
3. Twilight for Some - Mark Rogers
4. It's Alright - Sterling Void
5. Promise Land - Joe Smooth
6. Party Time (Feel Ya) - Pal Joey
7. No Way Back - Adonis
8. Can You Party? - Royal House
9. Mind Games [Underground Mix] - Quest Carl Bias
10. Your Love - Frankie Knuckles G. Cooke
11. Bring Down The Walls - DJ Soul Slinger, Robert Owens
12. The Weekend - Todd Terry
13. Can You Feel It - Larry Heard Fingers Inc. Chuck Roberts
14 House Nation - Nat Jones, Housemaster Boyz
