= Cynthia (singer) =

Record label MicMac Records, Inc.

- Born: Cynthia Torres; May 6, 1968 (age 58)
- Genres: Freestyle
- Occupation: Singer
- Years active: 1987–present
- Labels: Micmac; Robbins Entertainment

Cynthia Torres (born May 6, 1968), known simply as Cynthia, is a Puerto Rican-American freestyle and dance-pop singer. Cynthia is best known for her hits "Dreamboy/Dreamgirl" (with Johnny O), "Break Up to Make Up" and "If I Had the Chance", which peaked at numbers 53, 70 and 83 on the Billboard Hot 100, respectively. In 2005, she recorded a duet piece with Lisette Melendez entitled "I Can't Change Your Mind".

== Discography ==
=== Studio albums ===
Source: AllMusic

Year	Album details
1990	Cynthia: Released: 17 October 1990; Label: Micmac Records
1991	Cynthia II: Released: 1 July 1991; Label: Micmac Records
1995	Cynthia the Remixes: Released: 16 April 1995; Label: Micmac Records
1999	Thinking About You: Released: 15 June 1999; Label: Robbins Entertainment
2001	Cynthia's Greatest Hits: Released: 2001; Label: Thump Records
2009	Megamix: Released: 3 February 2009; Label: Micmac Records

=== Singles ===
Year	Single	Chart positions			Album
Year	Single	USA	USA dance	Sales USA dance	Album
1988	"Change on Me"	-	37	43	Cynthia
1988	"Endless Night"	-	-	28	Cynthia
1989	"Thief of Hearts"	-	-	31	Cynthia
1990	"Dreamboy / Dreamgirl"	53	-	17	Cynthia II
1991	"What Will It Take"	-	-	-	Cynthia II
1991	"Break Up to Make Up"	70	-	-	Cynthia II
1992	"Love Me Tonight"	-	-	-	The Remixes
1993	"Everytime I Look at You"	-	-	-	The Remixes
1993	"Forever Missing You"	-	-	-	The Remixes
1994	"Medley"	-	-	-	Non-album release
1994	"How I Love Him"	107	15	28	Thinking About You
1997	"Like a Star"	-	28	18	Thinking About You
1998	"If I Had the Chance"	83	-	11	Thinking About You
1999	"Thinking About You"	-	-	49	Thinking About You
2000	"I Never Said"	-	-	33	Thinking About You
2016	"Starlight"	-	-	-	Released single (iTunes)

== See also ==
- Nuyorican
- Puerto Ricans in New York City
