= List of songs recorded by Usher =

This is a list of songs recorded by Usher. Usher Raymond IV is an American singer and songwriter. He has released 7 studio albums, 9 compilation albums and 52 singles. He has also appeared on 22 albums released by other artists. His songs have been released on other compilation albums, including Disneymania, a compilation of Disney songs covered by popular artists. Usher has recorded songs with other popular artists including Mariah Carey, Justin Bieber, Pitbull, Pheelz, Latto, Burna Boy, Afrojack and Wiz Khalifa among others. As of 2016, he has recorded more than 150 songs.

== List ==
List of songs recorded by Usher
Song	Artist(s)	Writer(s)	Album(s)	Year	Ref.
"2nd Round"	Usher	Usher Raymond; Thomas Pentz; Ariel Rechtshaid; Juan Najera	Looking 4 Myself	2012	
"A-Town Girl"	Usher with Latto	Usher Raymond; Etdrick Bohannon; Paul Dawson; Rafael Ishman; Billy Joel; Jaylyn McDonald; Alyssa Stephens; Theron Thomas; Keith Thomas	Coming Home	2024	
"Appetite"	Usher	Usher Raymond; Floyd Nathaniel Hills; Ezekiel Lewis; Balewa Muhammad; Jermaine Dupri; Manuel Seal; Brian Casey; Marcella Araica	Here I Stand	2008	
"ATA"	Usher and Zaytoven	Usher Raymond; Xavier Dotson; Deion Gill; Dimitri Anthony McDowell; Major Myjah; Elliott Trent	A	2018	
"Bad Girl"	Usher	Usher Raymond; Bobby Ross Avila; Issiah J. Avila; Danté Barton; Wil Guice; James Harris III; Terry Lewis	Confessions	2004	
"Bad Habits"	Usher	Usher Raymond; Pierre Medor; Theron Thomas; Keith Thomas	—	2020	
"Bedtime"	Usher	Kenneth Edmonds	My Way	1997	
"Before I Met You"	Usher	Usher Raymond; Bryan-Michael Cox; Johntá Austin; Kasseem Dean; Craig Love	Here I Stand	2008	
"Best Thing"	Usher featuring Jay-Z	Usher Raymond; Jermaine Dupri; Manuel Seal; LRoc; Johntá Austin; Shawn Carter	Here I Stand	2008	
"Better on the Other Side"	Usher with Various Artists	Jayceon Taylor	non-album release	2009	
"Big"	Usher	Usher Raymond; Javiere Boswell; Keith Thomas	Coming Home	2024	
"Birthday"	Usher and Zaytoven	Usher Raymond; Brian Bates; Tugun Canno; Carlos Coleman; Jocelyn A. Donald; Xavier Dotson; Deion Gill; Dimitri Anthony McDowell; Major Myjah; Keith Thomas; Theron Thomas; Timothy Thomas; Elliott Trent	A	2018	
"Bop"	Usher	Terius Gesteelde-Diamant; Chauncey Hollis	Coming Home	2024	
"Boyfriend"	Usher	Usher Raymond; Richard Butler, Jr. Darhyl Camper	—	2023	
"Bump"	Usher	Usher Raymond; Luther Campbell; Terius Nash; Jonathan Smith; Christopher Stewart	Hard II Love	2014	
"Burn"	Usher	Usher Raymond; Jermaine Dupri; Bryan-Michael Cox	Confessions	2004	
"California"	Usher featuring Tyga	Usher Raymond; Kaj Nelson Blokhuis; Ryan Cambetes; Ester Dean; Melvin Hough II; Shane McAnally; Michael Stevenson; Ryan Tedder; Michael Wise; Rivelino Wouter	—	2020	
"Call Me a Mack"	Usher	Usher Raymond; Tim Thomas; Teddy Bishop	Poetic Justice soundtrack	1993	
"Can You Help Me"	Usher	Usher Raymond; James Harris III; Terry Lewis	8701	2001	
"Can U Get wit It"	Usher	DeVante Swing	Usher	1994	
"Can U Handle It?"	Usher	Usher Raymond; James Gass; Robin Thicke	Confessions	2004	
"Can't Stop Won't Stop"	Usher	Will Adams; Keith Harris; William M. Joel	Looking 4 Myself	2012	
"Caught Up"	Usher	Andre Harris; Vidal Davis; Jason Boyd; Ryan Toby	Confessions	2004	
"Chains"	Usher featuring Nas and Bibi Bourelly	Usher Raymond; Issiah J. Avila; Badriia Bourelly; Albert Andre Bowman; Paul Epworth; Miguel Gandelman; Sally Herbert; Nasir Jones; Juan Najera; Arthur Strong	—	2015	
"Champions"	Usher with Rubén Blades	Usher Raymond; Rubén Blades; Raphael Saadiq; Taura Stinson	Hard II Love	2014	
"Climax"	Usher	Usher Raymond; Thomas Pentz; Ariel Rechtshaid; Sean Fenton	Looking 4 Myself	2012	
"Clueless"	Usher	Usher Raymond; Ernest Clark; Eric Jackson; Marcos Palacios; Kevin Randolph; Tony Russell; Leon Youngblood	—	2014	
"Cold Blooded"	Usher with The-Dream	Usher Raymond; Terius Gesteelde-Diamant; Pharrell Williams	Coming Home	2024	
"Come Back"	Usher	Usher Raymond; Jermaine Dupri; Manuel Seal; Joe Cocker; Chris Stainton	My Way	1997	
"Come Thru"	Summer Walker with Usher	Usher Raymond; Kendall Roark Bailey; Nija Charles; Jermaine Dupri; London Holmes; Aubrey Robinson; Manuel Seal, Jr. Summer Walker	Over It	2019	
"Comin' for X-Mas?"	Usher	Daryl Simmons	—	1995	
"Coming Home"	Usher with Burna Boy	Usher Raymond; Marc Byers; Phillip Moses; Damini Ogulu	Coming Home	2024	
"Confessions (Interlude)"	Usher	Usher Raymond; Valdez Brantley; Juan Najera; Aaron Spears; Arthur Strong	Confessions	2004	
"Confessions Part I"	Usher	Usher Raymond; Jermaine Dupri; Bryan-Michael Cox	Confessions	2004	
"Confessions Part II"	Usher	Usher Raymond; Jermaine Dupri; Bryan-Michael Cox	Confessions	2004	
"Confessions Part II Remix"	Usher featuring Shyne, Kanye West & Twista)	Usher Raymond; Jermaine Dupri; Bryan-Michael Cox	Confessions	2004	
"Crash"	Usher	Usher Raymond; Carlos St. John; Lee Stashenko; Corey Williams	Hard II Love	2014	
"Crazy"	Usher	Brian Alexander Morgan	Usher	1994	
"Dientes"	Usher J Balvin and DJ Khaled	—	—	2023	
"Dive"	Usher	Rico Love; James Scheffer; Daniel Morris; Frank Romano	Raymond v. Raymond	2010	
"DJ Got Us Fallin' in Love"	Usher featuring Pitbull	Martin Sandberg; Karl Johan Schuster; Savan Kotecha; Armando C. Perez	Raymond v. Raymond	2010	
"Do It to Me"	Usher	Usher Raymond; Jermaine Dupri; Bryan-Michael Cox	Confessions	2004	
"Doin' the Most"	Usher	Usher Raymond; Bobby Ross Avila; Issiah J. Avila; James Harris III; Terry Lewis	Rhythm City Volume One: Caught Up	2005	
"Don't Be Cruel"	Usher	Kenneth Edmonds; L.A. Reid; Daryl Simmons	Live	1999	
"Don't Waste My Time"	Usher featuring Ella Mai	Usher Raymond; Bryan-Michael Cox; Jermaine Dupri; Christopher Allen Jones Ella Mai; Wilbard McCoy III	—	2019	
"Dot Com"	Usher	Usher Raymond; Robert Daniels; James Gass; Robin Thicke; Guy Sebastian	Rhythm City Volume One: Caught Up	2005	
"Down Time"	Usher	Usher Raymond; Darius Ginn, Jr. Mario Jefferson	Hard II Love	2014	
"Euphoria"	Usher	Usher Raymond; Klas Åhlund; Steve Angello; Sebastian Ingrosso; Axel Hedfors; Ryon Lovett; Terry Lewis; Juan Najera	Looking 4 Myself	2012	
"Every Little Step"	Usher	Kenneth Edmonds; L.A. Reid	Live	1999	
"Fed Up"	DJ Khaled featuring Usher, Drake, Young Jeezy & Rick Ross	Usher Raymond; Khaled Khaled; Jay Jenkins; William Roberts; Aubrey Graham	Victory	2009	
"Final Goodbye"	Usher	Gordon Chambers; Dave Hall; Ward Corbett; Floyd Norris	Usher	1994	
"First Dance"	Justin Bieber featuring Usher	Usher Raymond; Justin Bieber; Jesse Wilson; Rico Love; Dwight Reynolds; Alexander Parhm, Jr.	My World	2009	
"Follow Me"	Usher	Usher Raymond; Andre Harris; Vidal Davis; Jason Boyd; Ryan Toby	Confessions	2004	
"Foolin' Around"	Usher	Usher Raymond; Bryan-Michael Cox; Jermaine Dupri; Johntá Austin	Raymond v. Raymond	2010	
"FWM"	Usher	Usher Raymond; Paris Jones; Dernst Emile II	Hard II Love	2014	
"Get in My Car"	Usher featuring Bun B	Usher Raymond; Esther Dean; Polow Da Don; Bernard James Freeman	Raymond v. Raymond	2010	
"Gift Shop"	Usher and Zaytoven featuring Gunna	Usher Raymond; Jocelyn A. Donald; Xavier Dotson; Sergio Kitchens; Tony Wilson	A	2018	
"Glu"	Usher	Usher Raymond; Bobby Ross Avila; Issiah J. Avila; Sean Garrett; Jonathan Smith	—	2023	
"Go Missin'"	Usher and Diplo	Usher Raymond; Thomas Pentz	—	2013	
"Good Good"	Usher with Summer Walker and 21 Savage	Usher Raymond; Shéyaa Abraham-Joseph; Nija Charles; Paul Dawson; Melvin Hough I Caleb Ishman; Rafael Ishman; Jaylyn McDonald; Tauren Stovall; Keith Thomas; Summer Walker; Rivelino Wouter	Coming Home	2024	
"Good Love"	City Girls featuring Usher	Usher Raymond; Caresha Brownlee; Tony Butler; Luther Campbell; Nija Charles; Kinta Cox; Corey Dennard; Rick Finch; Lathun Grady; Jatavia Johnson; Paul Lewis; Jonathan Smith	RAW	2023	
"Good Kisser"	Usher	Usher Raymond; Andrew Wansel; Ronald Colson; Jameel Roberts; Terry Sneed; Warren Felder	Hard II Love	2014	
"Good Ol' Ghetto"	Usher	Usher Raymond; Jermaine Dupri; Bryan-Michael Cox	8701	2001	
"Guilty"	Usher featuring T.I.	Usher Raymond; Esther Dean; Clifford Harris; Keith Thomas; Alexander Parhm, Jr.	Raymond v. Raymond	2010	
"Hard II Love"	Usher	Usher Raymond; Yonatan Ayal; Bibi Bourelly	Hard II Love	2014	
"Here I Stand"	Usher	Usher Raymond; Polow da Don; Andre Harris; Vidal Davis; Adam Blackstone; Gerrell Gaddis	Here I Stand	2008	
"Hey Daddy (Daddy's Home)"	Usher	Usher Raymond; Andrew Harr; Jermaine Jackson; Rico Love	Raymond v. Raymond	2010	
"His Mistakes"	Usher	Usher Raymond; Shaffer Smith; Mikkel Storleer Eriksen; Tor Erik Hermansen	Here I Stand	2008	
"Hot Thing"	Usher featuring A$AP Rocky	Usher Raymond; Pharrell Williams; Rakim Myers	Looking 4 Myself	2012	
"Hot Tottie"	Usher featuring Jay-Z	Martin Sandberg; Esther Dean; Shawn Carter; Polow da Don; Paul Dawson	Raymond v. Raymond	2010	
"Hottest Thing"	Usher	Mike City	8701	2001	
"How Do I Say"	Usher	Usher Raymond; James Harris III; Terry Lewis	8701	2001	
"I Am the Party"	Usher	Bryan-Michael Cox; Jermaine Dupri	Coming Home	2024	
"I Care for U"	Usher	Usher Raymond; Nathaniel Hills; Eric Bellinger; Juan Najera; Kevin Cossom; Marcella Araica	Looking 4 Myself	2012	
"I Cry"	Usher	Usher Raymond; Nasri Atweh; Jeff Gitelman	—	2020	
"I Can't Let U Go"	Usher	Usher Raymond; Jermaine Dupri; Bryan-Michael Cox	8701	2001	
"I Don't Know"	Usher featuring P. Diddy	Pharrell Williams; Drayton Goss	8701	2001	
"I Don't Mind"	Usher featuring Juicy J	Usher Raymond; Lukasz Gottwald; Jordan Houston; Jacob Kasher; Theron Thomas; Timothy Thomas; Henry Walter	—	2014	
"I Love U"	Usher	Dernst Emile II; Terius Gesteelde-Diamant; Christopher Stewart	Coming Home	2024	
"I Need a Girl (Part One)"	P. Diddy featuring Usher & Loon	Sean Combs; Nasir Jones; Chauncey Hawkins; Mario Winans; Michael Carlos Jones; Adonis Shropshire	We Invented the Remix	2002	
"I Need Love"	Usher	Robert Ervin; Bobby Erving; Steve Ettinger; Darryl Pierce; David Pierce; Dwayne Simon; James Todd Smith	Live	1999	
"I Will"	Usher	Teddy Ridley; Chauncey Hannibal; Sherri Blair; Eric Williams	My Way	1997	
"I.F.U."	Usher	Rico Love; Andrew Wansel; Autoro Whitfield; Ronald "Flippa" Colson	Looking 4 Myself	2012	
"I'll Make It Right"	Usher	Alexander Richbourg; Darren Benbow; Faith Evans; Isaiah Lee; Kiyamma Griffin; Laquentis Saxon	Usher	1994	
"I'll Show You Love"	Usher	Alexander Richbourg; Charles Bobbit; Faith Evans; Fred Wesley; J. Brown; Joe Howell; Mark South	Usher	1994	
"If I Want To"	Usher	Usher Raymond; Jermaine Dupri; Bryan-Michael Cox; Kenneth Edmonds; Christopher Wallace; Osten Harvey; Roger Troutman	8701	2001	
"Interlude 1"	Usher	Usher Raymond; Faith Evans; Chucky Thompson	Usher	1994	
"Interlude 2 (Can't Stop)"	Usher	Usher Raymond; Faith Evans; Chucky Thompson	Usher	1994	
"Intro"	Usher	James Lackley	Confessions	2004	
"Intro"	Usher	Usher Raymond; Ryon Lovett; James Lackey	Here I Stand	2008	
"Intro-Lude 8701"	Usher	Usher Raymond	8701	2001	
"It Is What It Is"	Usher	Usher Raymond; Bobby Ross Avila; Issiah J. Avila; James Wright; James Harris III; Terry Lewis	Rhythm City Volume One: Caught Up	2005	
"Just Like Me"	Usher featuring Lil' Kim	Kimberly Jones; Jermaine Dupri; Manuel Seal	My Way	1997	
"Lay You Down"	Usher Lil	Usher Raymond; Rico Love; Dwayne Nesmith	Raymond v. Raymond	2010	
"Keep on Dancin'"	Usher	Camara Alford; Jens Isaksen; Rafael Ishman; Christopher Stewart; Keith Thomas	Coming Home	2024	
"Kissing Strangers"	Usher	Usher Raymond; James Abrahart Jr. Michael Busbee; Ryan Daly; Jonny Price	Coming Home	2024	
"LaLaLa"	Usher with Black Coffee	Usher Raymond; Lucky Daye; Mikkel S. Eriksen; Tor E. Hermansen; Nkosinathi Maphumulo; India Shawn	Subconsciously	2019	
"Lemme See"	Usher featuring Rick Ross	Usher Raymond; James Scheffer; Daniel Morris; Nickolas Marzouca; Eric Bellinger; Lundon Knighten; William Roberts	Looking 4 Myself	2012	
"Lessons for the Lover"	Usher	Rico Love; Pierre Medor; Earl Hood; Eric Goudy II	Looking 4 Myself	2012	
"Let Me"	Usher	Usher Raymond; Jahron Brathwaite; David Hughes; Melvin Riley	Hard II Love	2014	
"Lifetime"	Usher	Usher Raymond; Ryon Lovett; James Lackey	Here I Stand	2008	
"Lil Freak"	Usher featuring Nicki Minaj	Usher Raymond; Elvis Williams; Polow da Don; Esther Dean; Onika Maraj	Raymond v. Raymond	2010	
"Lingerie"	Usher	Usher Raymond; James Harris III; Terry Lewis; Bobby Ross Avila; Issiah J. Avila	Raymond v. Raymond	2010	
"Looking 4 Myself"	Usher featuring Luke Steele	Rico Love; Pierre Medor; Earl Hood; Eric Goudy II	Looking 4 Myself	2012	
"Looking for Love"	Diddy – Dirty Money featuring Usher	Michael Jones; James Lackey; William Roberts	Last Train to Paris	2010	
"Love 'Em All"	Usher	Usher Raymond; Usher Raymond; James Harris III; Terry Lewis; Bobby Ross Avila; Issiah J. Avila; Miguel Pimentel	Raymond v. Raymond	2010	
"Love in This Club"	Usher featuring Young Jeezy	Usher Raymond; Darnell Dalton; Jay Wayne Jenkins; Polow Da Don; Ryon Lovett; Lamar Taylor; Keith Thomas	Here I Stand	2008	
"Love in This Club Part II"	Usher featuring Beyoncé and Lil Wayne	Usher Raymond; Darnell Dalton; Jay Wayne Jenkins; Polow Da Don; Ryon Lovett; Lamar Taylor; Keith Thomas; Thom Bell; Linda Creed; Dwayne Carter	Here I Stand	2008	
"Love Was Here"	Usher	Albert Joseph Brown III; Kiyamma Griffin	Usher	1994	
"Love You Gently"	Usher	Usher Raymond; Andre Harris; Vidal Davis; Raheem DeVaughn	Here I Stand	2008	
"Lovers and Friends"	Lil Jon & The East Side Boyz featuring Usher & Ludacris	Usher Raymond; Michael Sterling; Jonathan Smith; Christohger Bridges	Crunk Juice	2005	
"Luckiest Man"	Usher	Usher Raymond; Brandon Hodge; Akil King; Maurice Simmonds; Keith Thomas	Coming Home	2024	
"Make U a Believer"	Usher	Usher Raymond; Tommy Paxton-Beesley; Adam Feeney; Leland Wayne	Hard II Love	2014	
"Making Love (Into the Night)"	Usher	Rico Love; James Scheffer; Danny Morris; Benny Mardones	Raymond v. Raymond	2010	
"Margiela"	Usher	Usher Raymond; Terius Gesteelde-Diamant; James Lackey	Coming Home	2024	
"Mars vs. Venus"	Usher	Usher Raymond; James Harris III; Terry Lewis; Bobby Ross Avila; Issiah J. Avila; Miguel Pimentel	Raymond v. Raymond	2010	
"Milk Carton"	Usher	Ernest Clark Jr; Hasben Jones; Harold Lilly; Marcos Palacios; Aaron Sledge	—	2015	
"Mind of a Man"	Usher	Usher Raymond; Dernst Emile II	Hard II Love	2014	
"Missin U"	Usher	Usher Raymond; Walter Becker; Robert Calloway; Donald Fagen; Warren "Oak" Felder; Faheem Mardre; Andrew "Pop" Wansel; Autoro Whitfield	Hard II Love	2014	
"Monstar"	Usher	Usher Raymond; James Harris III; Terry Lewis; Bobby Ross Avila; Issiah J. Avila; Miguel Pimentel; Juan Najera	Raymond v. Raymond	2010	
"More"	Usher	Usher Raymond; Bilal Hajji; Nadir Khayat; Charles Hinshaw Jr.	Raymond v. Raymond	2010	
"Moving Mountains"	Usher	Usher Raymond; Tricky Stewart; Kuk Harrell; The-Dream	Here I Stand	2008	
"My Boo"	Usher with Alicia Keys	Usher Raymond; Alicia Keys; Jermaine Dupri; Adonis Shropshire; Manuel Seal	Confessions	2004	
"My Life Your Entertainment"	T.I. featuring Usher	Clifford Harris; Christopher Gholson; Kassim-Vonricco Washington	Paper Trail	2008	
"My Way"	Usher	Usher Raymond; Jermaine Dupri; Manuel Seal	My Way	1997	
"Naked"	Usher	—	Coming Home	2024	
"Need U"	Usher	Albert Bowman; Robert Calloway; Paul Epworth; Paris Jones; Faheem Mardre; Juan Najera	Hard II Love	2014	
"New Flame"	Chris Brown featuring Usher & Rick Ross	Usher Raymond; Christopher Brown; William Roberts; Verse Simmonds	X	2014	
"Nice & Slow"	Usher	Usher Raymond; Jermaine Dupri; Manuel Seal; Brian Casey	My Way	1997	
"No Limit"	Usher featuring Young Thug	Usher Raymond; Brandon Hodge; Christopher Perry; Keith Thomas; Theron Thomas; Timothy Thomas; Jeffrey Williams	Hard II Love	2014	
"Numb"	Usher	Usher Raymond; Klas Åhlund; Steve Angello; Sebastian Ingrosso; Axel Hedfors; Alessandro Lindblad; Ryon Lovett; Terry Lewis	Looking 4 Myself	2012	
"Okay"	Usher	James Lackey; Ryon Lovett	Raymond v. Raymond	2010	
"OMG"	Usher featuring will.i.am	William Adams	Raymond v. Raymond	2010	
"On the Side"	Usher	Usher Raymond; Johntá Austin; Bryan-Michael Cox; Jermaine Dupri; Rafael Ishman; Patrick Smith; Theron Thomas; Keith Thomas	Coming Home	2024	
"One Day You'll Be Mine"	Usher	Usher Raymond; Jermaine Dupri; Manuel Seal; Ronald Isley; Marvin Isley; Ernie Isley; Rudolph Isley; O'Kelly Isley; Chris Jasper	My Way	1997	
"One of Them Ones"	Usher	Usher Raymond; Michael Coleman; Dernst Emile II; Rafael Ishman; Jaylyn McDonald; Julian Morgan; Tauren Stovall; Damon Thomas; Keith Thomas	Coming Home	2024	
"Papers"	Usher	Usher Raymond; Sean Garrett; Xavier Dotson; Alonzo Mathis	Raymond v. Raymond	2010	
"Party"	Chris Brown featuring Usher and Gucci Mane	Usher Raymond; Lyrica Anderson; Floyd Bentley; Christopher Brown; Radric Davis; Ishmael Montague; Melvin Moore; Bobby Joseph Turner, Jr.	Heartbreak on a Full Moon	2016	
"Peace Sign"	Usher and Zaytoven	Usher Raymond; Jocelyn A. Donald; Xavier Dotson; Deitrick Haddon; Dimitri Anthony McDowell; Elliott Trent	A	2018	
"Peaches (Remix)"	Justin Bieber featuring Ludacris, Usher and Snoop Dogg	Usher Raymond; Louis Bell; Christopher Bridges; Calvin Broadus, Jr. Giveon Evans; Bernard Harvey; Felisha King-Harvey; Matthew Sean Leon; Luis Martinez, Jr. Aaron Simmonds; Ashton Simmonds; Andrew Wotman; Keavan Yazdani	—	2021	
"Pianolude"	Usher	—	Live	1999	
"Pleaase U"	Usher	Isaac Bolivar; David Brown; Leon Carr; Jackson Morgan; Vaughn Oliver; Earl Shuman; Anthony Watts	Coming Home	2024	
"Pop Ya Collar"	Usher	Usher Raymond; Kevin "Shekspere" Briggs; Kandi Burruss	8701	2001	
"Prayer for You (Interlude)"	Usher	—	Here I Stand	2008	
"Pro Lover"	Usher	Usher Raymond; James Harris III; Terry Lewis; Bobby Ross Avila; Issiah J. Avila; Miguel Pimentel	Raymond v. Raymond	2010	
"Promise"	Romeo Santos featuring Usher	Romeo Santos; Pierre Medor; Rico Love	Formula, Vol. 1	2011	
"Red Light"	Usher	Keri Hilson; Jonathan Smith; Lamarquis Jefferson; Patrick J. Que Smith; Sean Garrett	Confessions	2004	
"Rest of My Life"	Ludacris featuring Usher & David Guetta	—	Ludaversal	2012	
"Revolver"	Usher	Usher Raymond; Alexander Parhm; M. Glover; Miguel Pimentel; S. Robinson; Ryan Toby	Here I Stand	2008	
"Risk It All"	Usher with H.E.R	James Napier; Gabriella Wilson	Coming Home	2024	
"Rivals"	Usher featuring Future	Usher Raymond; Kendricke "K-Major" Brown; Paris Jones; Cameron "Murphy Kid" Murphy; Carlos St. John; Nayvadius Wilburn	Hard II Love	2014	
"Rock Wit'cha"	Usher	Kenneth Edmonds; L.A. Reid	Live	1999	
"Roni"	Usher	Kenneth Edmonds	Live	1999	
"Room in a Room"	Usher	Usher Raymond; Johntá Austin; Dernst Emile II	Coming Home	2024	
"Ruin"	Usher with Pheelz	Usher Raymond; Ndumiso Manana; Phillip Moses	Coming Home	2024	
"Same Girl"	Usher (with R. Kelly)	Robert Kelly; Ronnie Jackson	Double Up	2007	
"Say the Words"	Usher	Usher Raymond; Luke Steele; Surahn Sidhu	Looking 4 Myself	2012	
"Say What U Want"	Usher and Zaytoven	Usher Raymond; Carlos Coleman; Xavier Dotson; Darius Ginn, Jr. Deion Gill; Deitrick Haddon; Dimitri Anthony McDowell; Major Myjah; Elliott Trent	A	2018	
"Scream"	Usher	Usher Raymond; Max Martin; Shellback; Savan Kotecha	Looking 4 Myself	2012	
"Seduction"	Usher	Usher Raymond; Bobby Ross Avila; Issiah J. Avila; James Q. Wright; James Harris III; Terry Lewis; Rico Love	Confessions	2004	
"Separated"	Usher	Usher Raymond; Daron Jones; Cedric Moore	8701	2001	
"SexBeat"	Usher featuring Lil Jon and Ludacris	Usher Raymond; Christopher Bridges; Jermaine Dupri; Antoine Harris; Jonathan Smith	—	2020	
"She Ain't Tell Ya"	Usher and Zaytoven	Usher Raymond; Xavier Dotson; Darius Ginn, Jr. Mario Jefferson; Nayvadius Wilburn	A	2018	
"She Came to Give It to You"	Usher featuring Nicki Minaj	Usher Raymond; Onika Maraj; Pharrell Williams	Hard II Love	2014	
"She Don't Know"	Usher Lil featuring Ludacris	Usher Raymond; Sean Garrett; Shondrae Crawford; Christopher Bridges; Ebo Taylor	Raymond v. Raymond	2010	
"Show Me"	Usher	Usher Raymond; Nathaniel Hills; Kevin Cossom; Marcella Araica	Looking 4 Myself	2012	
"Simple Things"	Usher	Usher Raymond; Bobby Ross Avila; Issiah J. Avila; James Harris III; Terry Lewis	Confessions	2004	
"Sins of My Father"	Usher	Usher Raymond; Salaam Remi; Rico Love; Terry Lewis	Looking 4 Myself	2012	
"Slow Jam"	Usher featuring Monica	Kenneth Edmonds; Boaz Watson; Belinda Lipscomb; Sidney Johnson	My Way	1997	
"Slow Love"	Usher	Isaiah Lee; Albert Joseph Brown III	Usher	1994	
"Smile Again"	Usher	Dave Hollister; Faith Evans; Herb Middleton	Usher	1994	
"Somebody to Love (Remix)"	Usher featuring Justin Bieber	Jonathan Yip; Jeremy Reeves; Ray Romulus; Heather Bright	Raymond v. Raymond	2010	
"Something Special"	Usher	Usher Raymond; Jermaine Dupri; Manuel Seal; LRoc; Johntá Austin	Here I Stand	2008	
"Spotlight"	Gucci Mane featuring Usher	Usher Raymond; Polow Da Don; Radric Davis	The State vs. Radric Davis	2009	
"One of Them Ones"	Usher	Usher Raymond; Michael Coleman; Dernst Emile II; Rafael Ishman; Jaylyn McDonald; Julian Morgan; Tauren Stovall; Damon Thomas; Keith Thomas	Coming Home	2024	
"Standing Next to You (Remix)"	Usher with Jungkook	Usher Raymond; Johntá Austin; Jonathan Bellion; Alexandra Tamposi; Henry Walter; Andrew Wotman	Coming Home	2024	
"Stay at Home"	Usher and Zaytoven featuring Future	Usher Raymond; Xavier Dotson; Nayvadius Wilburn	A	2018	
"Stone Kold Freak"	Usher	Usher Raymond; Etdrick Bohannon; Richard Butler Jr. Paul Dawson; Keith Thomas; Jakub Liszko	Coming Home	2024	
"Stranger"	Usher	Usher Raymond; Ryon Lovett; Christopher Gholson	Raymond v. Raymond	2010	
"Stronger"	Usher	Usher Raymond; Taji Ausar; Yonatan Ayal; Elley Duhé; Andrew Fridge; Joseph Hill, Jr. Titus "Marko Penn" Stubblefield; Zachary Williams	Hard II Love	2014	
"Superstar"	Usher	Usher Raymond; Andre Harris; Vidal Davis; Jason Boyd; Ryan Toby; Nyticka Hemingway; Willie Hutch	Confessions	2004	
"Superstar (Interlude)"	Usher	Usher Raymond; Valdez Brantley; Juan Najera; Aaron Spears; Arthur Strong	Confessions	2004	
"Sweet Lies"	Usher	Chad Hugo; Pharrell Williams	"Yeah!"	2004	
"T.T.P."	Usher	Usher Raymond; Jermaine Dupri; Bryan-Michael Cox	8701	2001	
"Take Your Hand"	Usher	Leon Huff; Gene McFadden; John Whitehead; Rich Harrison	Confessions	2004	
"Tell Me"	Usher	Usher Raymond; Nazir Assad; Trevian Chandler; George Johnson; Ryan Toby	Hard II Love	2014	
"Tender Love"	Usher	James Harris III; Terry Lewis	Live	1999	
"That's What It's Made For"	Usher	Usher Raymond; Bobby Ross Avila; Issiah J. Avila; James Q. Wright; James Harris III; Terry Lewis	Confessions	2004	
"The Christmas Song"	Justin Bieber featuring Usher	Mel Tormé; Robert Wells	Under the Mistletoe	2011	
"The Many Ways"	Usher	Dave "Jam" Hall; Albert Joseph Brown III	Usher	1994	
"The Party Continues"	Jermaine Dupri featuring Usher & Da Brat	—	Life in 1472	1998	
"There Goes My Baby"	Usher	Rico Love; James Scheffer; Frank Romano; Danny Morris	Raymond v. Raymond	2010	
"Think of You"	Usher	Usher Raymond; Donell Jones; Faith Evans; Chucky Thompson	Usher	1994	
"This Ain't Sex"	Usher	Usher Raymond; Tricky Stewart; Jazze Pha; The-Dream	Here I Stand	2008	
"This Day"	Usher featuring Kiana Ledé	Davy Nathan; Philip Lawrence	Jingle Jangle: A Christmas Journey	2020	
"Throwback"	Usher	Lamont Dozier; Brian Holland; Edward Holland; Justin Smith; Patrick J. Que Smith; Richard Wylie; Rico Love	Confessions	2004	
"Too Much"	Marshmello and Imanbek featuring Usher	Khamari Barnes; Christopher Comstock; Nate Cyphert; Diederik van Elsas; Parrish Warrington; Imanbek Zeikenov	—	2020	
"Touch'N You"	Rick Ross featuring Usher	Usher Raymond; Rico Love; Pierre Medor; William Roberts	God Forgives, I Don't	2012	
"Trading Places"	Usher	Usher Raymond; Los da Mystro; The-Dream	Here I Stand	2008	
"Transparency"	2 Chainz and Lil Wayne featuring Usher	Lerron Carson; Dwayne Carter; Altariq Crapps; Michael Dean; Tauheed Epps; Francis Leblanc; Melvin Moore; Christian Ward	Welcome 2 Collegrove	2023	
"Truth Hurts"	Usher	Usher Raymond; Bobby Ross Avila; Issiah J. Avila; James Harris III; Terry Lewis	Confessions	2004	
"Twisted"	Usher featuring Pharrell	Usher Raymond; Pharrell Williams	Looking 4 Myself	2012	
"Twork It Out"	Usher	Usher Raymond; James Harris III; Terry Lewis	8701	2001	
"U Don't Have to Call"	Usher	Pharrell Williams	8701	2001	
"U Got It Bad"	Usher	Usher Raymond; Jermaine Dupri; Bryan-Michael Cox	8701	2001	
"U R the One"	Usher	Usher Raymond; R.L. Huggar	8701	2001	
"U Remind Me"	Usher	Anita McCloud; Edmund Clement	8701	2001	
"U-Turn"	Usher	Usher Raymond; Jermaine Dupri; Bryan-Michael Cox	8701	2001	
"Wait for It"	Usher	Lin-Manuel Miranda	The Hamilton Mixtape	2016	
"What Happened to U"	Usher	Rico Love; Eric Bellinger; Noah Shebib; Sidney Brown; Sean Combs; Reginald Ellis; Norman Glover; Carl Thompson; Christopher Wallace	Looking 4 Myself	2012	
"What More Can I Give"	Various Artists	Michael Jackson	charity record	2003	
"What You Need"	Usher	Adonis Shropshire; Jermaine Dupri; Manuel Seal	Rhythm City Volume One: Caught Up	2005	
"What's a Man to Do"	Usher	Usher Raymond; Johntá Austin; Mikkel Storleer Eriksen; Tor Erik Hermansen	Here I Stand	2008	
"What's Your Name"	Usher featuring will.i.am	Usher Raymond; William Adams; Ryan Toby	Here I Stand	2008	
"Whatever I Want"	Usher	Usher Raymond; Rich Harrison; Johnny Otis; Shuggie Otis; Maxwell Davis	Confessions	2004	
"Will Work for Love"	Usher	Usher Raymond; J. R. Rotem; James Fauntleroy II	Here I Stand	2008	
"Whispers"	Usher	Darryl Pearson; DeVante Swing	Usher	1994	
"Without U (Interlude)"	Usher	Usher Raymond	8701	2001	
"Without You"	David Guetta featuring Usher	Usher Raymond; Taio Cruz; Rico Love; Giorgio Tuinfort; Frédéric Riesterer	Nothing but the Beat	2011	
"Yeah!"	Usher featuring Lil Jon & Ludacris	Chris Bridges; Sean Garrett; Patrick J. Que Smith; LaMarquis Jefferson; James Phillips Jonathan Smith; Robert McDowell	Confessions	2004	
"You Make Me Wanna..."	Usher	Usher Raymond; Jermaine Dupri; Manuel Seal	My Way	1997	
"You Decide"	Usher and Zaytoven	Usher Raymond; Xavier Dotson; Deitrick Haddon; Dimitri Anthony McDowell; Elliott Trent; Tony Wilson	A	2018	
"You Took My Heart"	Usher	Usher Raymond; Donell Jones; Edward Ferrell; Kenneth Tonge; Ward Corbett	Usher	1994	
