= Live (Usher album) =

Live album by Usher
- Released: March 23, 1999
- Recorded: October 15–16, 1998, Chattanooga, Tennessee
- Genre: R&B
- Length: 54:27
- Labels: LaFace; Arista
- Producers: Usher; Jermaine Dupri; Babyface

Usher chronology
My Way (1997)	Live (1999)	8701 (2001)

Singles from Live
- 1. "Bedtime" Released: February 18, 1999

Live is a live album by American singer Usher. It was recorded on October 15 and 16, 1998 in the singer's hometown of Chattanooga, Tennessee, and released by LaFace Records on March 23, 1999. Both audio-only and video longform versions were released; it was distributed to break up the gap between Usher's second and third studio albums, My Way (1997) and 8701 (2001).

Live received generally negative reviews from critics; many criticized the poor live sound of Usher's voice on the album. Live reached number 73 on the Billboard 200, number 30 on the Top R&B Albums and number 3 on the Top Music Videos. The album has sold over 200,000 copies in the United States, and both the audio and video versions have been certified gold by the Recording Industry Association of America (RIAA).

== Background ==
Live was released to keep Usher's fans satisfied during the four-year break between My Way (1997) and 8701, his second and third studio albums, respectively. During that time, Usher was busy pursuing an acting career in films The Faculty (1998), Light It Up (1999) and Texas Rangers (2001). The album was recorded at two free concerts Usher performed in his hometown of Chattanooga, Tennessee on October 15 and 16, 1998. Usher stated his reasons for releasing a live album in an interview with MTV, "I really like the sound of a band, that's one, just for myself, but there were so many people who didn't get a chance to see the concert, so I came out with a live version of most of the songs on my album, and I came out with a home video for all the people who didn't get a chance to see the performance, and a little bio of me as well." Seven of the songs included on Live are from Usher's self-titled debut album (1994) and My Way. A medley of songs originally performed by Bobby Brown—"Don't Be Cruel", "Every Little Step", "Rock Wit'cha" and "Roni"—is also featured on the album, along with covers of Force MDs' "Tender Love" and LL Cool J's "I Need Love".

Live was released in the United States by LaFace Records on March 23, 1999 by means of compact disc, cassette and VHS formats; along with the concert footage, the VHS features interviews with Usher. The audio version Live was later serviced to digital retailers for music download.

== Reception ==
Professional ratings
Review scores
Source	Rating
Allmusic	2/5 stars
Robert Christgau	(dud)
Entertainment Weekly	C
Rolling Stone	2/5 stars
USA Today	2.5/4 stars

Live received generally negative reviews from music critics. Stephen Thomas Erlewine from Allmusic criticized Usher's "tired and weary" live sound, although he praised the remixed songs at the end of the album. Entertainment Weekly's J. D. Considine gave Live a C grade and wrote that, despite Usher's performing ability, the audio album is boring without video footage of the concerts. Neva Chonin of Rolling Stone was unimpressed with Usher's "tinny"-sounding voice on Live.

Live debuted at number 76 on the US Billboard 200 on the chart dated April 10, 2011, with first-week sales of 21,000 copies. The album peaked at number 73, and lasted nine weeks on the chart. On April 27, 1999 Live was certified gold by the Recording Industry Association of America (RIAA), denoting the shipment of 500,000 units, and by the end of 2001 Live had sold over 200,000 copies in the US. It debuted and peaked at number 30 on the Top R&B Albums, and remained on that chart for nine weeks. The video longform version of Live entered the US Top Music Videos chart at number four on the chart of April 10, 1999. It remained at number four for three weeks, before ascending to number three on May 1, 1999, where it peaked for one week. The RIAA certified the Live video gold, after it shipped 50,000 copies, on December 22, 1999. The video of the performance of "Bedtime" was made available at MTV.com, and the live version of "Bedtime" reached number 66 on the Hot R&B/Hip-Hop Singles & Tracks chart.

== Track listing ==
No.	Title	Writer(s)	Length
1.	"My Way"	Jermaine Dupri; Manuel Seal; Usher	3:36
2.	"Think of You"	Donell Jones; Faith Evans; Usher	2:15
3.	"Come Back"	Joe Cocker; Dupri; Seal; Chris Stainton; Usher	2:14
4.	"Just Like Me" (featuring Lil' Kim)	Dupri; Lil' Kim; Seal	3:24
5.	"Don't Be Cruel" (Intro)	Babyface; L.A. Reid; Daryl Simmons	1:04
6.	"Every Little Step"	Babyface; Reid	1:53
7.	"Rock Wit'cha"	Babyface; Reid	1:41
8.	"Roni"	Babyface	1:55
9.	"Pianolude"		3:32
10.	"I Need Love"	Robert Ervin; Bobby Erving; Steve Ettinger; LL Cool J; Darryl Pierce; David Pierce; Dwayne Simon; James Todd Smith	0:32
11.	"Tender Love"	Jimmy Jam & Terry Lewis	1:13
12.	"Bedtime"	Babyface	7:06
13.	"Nice & Slow"	Brian Casey; Dupri; Seal; Usher	6:30
14.	"You Make Me Wanna..."	Dupri; Seal; Usher	5:48
15.	"My Way" (JD's Remix)	Dupri; Seal; Usher	3:38
16.	"Nice & Slow" (B-Rock's Basement Mix)	Dupri; Seal; Usher	4:03
17.	"You Make Me Wanna..." (Tuff & Jam Dance Mix)	Dupri; Seal; Usher	6:45

== Personnel ==
Credits for Live adapted from Allmusic:

- Baron "B-Rock" Agee – production, remixing
- Leevirt Agee – vocals
- Babyface – writer, background vocals, executive production
- Valdez Brantley – arrangement, programming, production
- Josh Butler – engineering, remixing
- Regina Davenport – artists and repertoire (A&R)
- Jermaine Dupri – background vocals, production, remixing
- Bobby Erving – writing
- Alex Evans – bass
- Brian Frasier Moore – drums
- Brian Frye – engineering, mixing assistance
- John Frye – mixing assistance
- Jon Gass – mixing
- Phil Gitomer – engineering assistance
- David Hewitt – engineering
- Jagged Edge – background vocals
- LaMarquis Mark Jefferson – bass
- Stanley Jones – keyboards
- Matt "Jam" Lamont – production, remixing
- Lil' Kim – vocals
- Kevin Lively – coordination, mixing assistance
- LL Cool J – writer
- Trey Lorenz – background vocals
- Diane Makowski – production coordination
- Sean McClintock – engineering assistance
- Gavin "DJ Face" Mills – mixing
- Cherie O'Brien – creative coordinator
- Darryl Pierce – writer
- Herb Powers – mastering
- Kawan "KP" Prather – production, A&R
- Usher – percussion, arrangement, vocals, production, executive production
- L.A. Reid – executive production
- Toby Rivers – arrangement
- Todd Sams – arrangement
- Manuel Seal – background vocals, production
- Shanice – background vocals
- LaKimbra Sneed – design
- Phil Tan – engineering, mixing
- Courtney Taylor – creative coordinator
- Brian "Keys" Tharme – keyboards
- Candy Tookes – A&R
- Tuff Jam – mixing
- Twista – vocals
- D.L. Warfield – artwork, art direction

== Charts ==
Weekly chart performance for Live
Chart (1999)	Peak position
US Billboard 200	73
US Top Music Videos (Billboard)	3
US Top R&B/Hip-Hop Albums (Billboard)	30

== Certifications ==
Sales and certifications for Live
Region	Certification	Certified units/sales
United States (RIAA) Video	Gold	50,000^{^}
^{^} Shipments figures based on certification alone.
