= Dance!...Ya Know It! =

Remix album by Bobby Brown
- Released: October 26, 1989
- Recorded: 1986–1989
- Genres: R&B; hip hop; soul; pop
- Length: 48:14
- Label: MCA
- Producer: Louis Silas Jr.

Bobby Brown chronology
Don't Be Cruel (1988)	Dance!...Ya Know It! (1989)	Bobby (1992)

Professional ratings
Review scores
Source	Rating
AllMusic	2/5 stars
The Rolling Stone Album Guide	3/5 stars

Dance!...Ya Know it! is a remix album by American R&B singer Bobby Brown, released in 1989. The album features previously unreleased, re-edited versions and remixes of various songs from his King of Stage and Don't Be Cruel albums as well as "On Our Own", Brown's hit single from the Ghostbusters II soundtrack. "Every Little Hit Mega Mix", a medley of "Every Little Step", "On Our Own", "Don't Be Cruel", and "My Prerogative", was released as a single to promote the album but was not included on the album itself. The UK and European version of the megamix was titled "The Free Style Mega-mix" and was produced by Rita Liebrand; the Australian version, "The 'Every Little Hit' Mix", was released as a B-side on the European version of the "Roni" single.

== Overview ==
Released mostly to capitalize on the commercial success of Don't Be Cruel, Dance!...Ya Know It! was released by MCA Records. Production was mostly handled by producers Antonio "L.A." Reid and Babyface, with additional production handled by Larry Blackmon, Gene Griffin, and Robert Brookins.

== Track listing ==
Side one
No.	Title	Writer(s)	Length
1.	"Roni"	Babyface; Darnell Bristol	6:19
2.	"Rock Wit'cha"	Babyface; L.A. Reid	5:04
3.	"Girl Next Door"	Melvin Wells	6:14
4.	"Don't Be Cruel"	Babyface; Reid; Daryl Simmons	6:25

Side two
No.	Title	Writer(s)	Length
5.	"Every Little Step"	Babyface; Reid	3:57
6.	"On Our Own"	Babyface; Reid; Simmons	4:33
7.	"Baby, I Wanna Tell You Something"	Nathan Leftenant; Tomi Jenkins; Larry Blackmon	4:50
8.	"My Prerogative"	Bobby Brown; Teddy Riley; Timmy Gatling; Aaron Hall	5:26
9.	"Seventeen"	Tony Haynes; Robert Brookins	4:$3
Total length:			48:14

== Personnel ==
- After 7 – vocals (background)
- Babyface – producer, remixing
- David Bianco – remixing
- Larry Blackmon – producer
- Robert Brookins – producer
- Bobby Brown – vocals, producer
- Jon Gass – remixing
- Boris Granich – editing
- Todd Gray – photography
- Gene Griffin – producer, remixing
- Matthew Kasha – engineer
- Kevin Kendricks – associate producer
- Thom "TK" Kidd – engineer
- Chris Modig – editing
- Taavi Mote – engineer
- Dave Ogrin – engineer, associate producer, remixing, mixing
- Donald Parks – programming
- L.A. Reid – producer, remixing
- Michel Sauvage – engineer
- Eddy Schreyer – mastering
- Louis Silas Jr. – producer, executive producer, mixing
- Dale Sizer – artwork
- Donnell Sullivan – assistant engineer
- Al Teller – art direction
- Ilene Weingard – design
- Melvin Wells – associate producer
- Jon Wolfson – engineer

== Charts ==
=== Weekly charts ===
Weekly chart performance for Dance!...Ya Know It!
Chart (1989–1990)	Peak position
Australian Albums (ARIA)	14
Japanese Albums (Oricon)	34
New Zealand Albums (RMNZ)	7
UK Albums (Official Charts)	26
US Billboard 200	9
US Top R&B/Hip-Hop Albums (Billboard)	7

=== Year-end charts ===
Year-end chart performance for Dance!...Ya Know It!
Chart (1990)	Position
Australian Albums (ARIA)	97
US Billboard 200	46
US Top R&B/Hip-Hop Albums (Billboard)	39

== Certifications ==
Certifications for Dance!...Ya Know It!
Region	Certification	Certified units/sales
Canada (Music Canada)	Gold	50,000^{^}
Japan (RIAJ)	Gold	100,000^{^}
New Zealand (RMNZ)	Gold	7,500^{^}
United Kingdom (BPI)	Gold	100,000^{^}
United States (RIAA)	Platinum	1,000,000^{^}
^{^} Shipments figures based on certification alone.
