= Don't Be Cruel (album) =

Studio album by Bobby Brown
- Released: June 20, 1988
- Recorded: October 1987 – April 1988
- Studios: Silverlake (Los Angeles); Axis (New York)
- Genres: R&B; new jack swing
- Length: 47:08
- Label: MCA
- Producers: Babyface; L.A. Reid; Gordon Jones; Bobby Brown; Larry White; Teddy Riley

Bobby Brown chronology
King of Stage (1986)	Don't Be Cruel (1988)	Dance!...Ya Know It! (1989)

Singles from Don't Be Cruel
- 1. "Don't Be Cruel" Released: May 16, 1988; 2. "My Prerogative" Released: October 11, 1988; 3. "Roni" Released: December 27, 1988; 4. "Every Little Step" Released: January 31, 1989; 5. "Rock Wit'cha" Released: August 15, 1989

Professional ratings
Review scores
Source	Rating
AllMusic	5/5 stars
The Village Voice	B+

Don't Be Cruel is the second studio album by American singer Bobby Brown. It was released in the United States on June 20, 1988, by MCA Records. MCA changed producers for this album and had Brown work with hit-making songwriting and production duo Babyface and L.A. Reid. Brown dedicated the album to his deceased best friend James "Jimbo" Flint who was stabbed to death when Brown was aged 11. Don't Be Cruel incorporates new jack swing, R&B, funk, dance and soul.

Don't Be Cruel peaked at number one on the US Billboard 200 and included five top 10 Billboard Hot 100 hits, with "My Prerogative" being a US number-one hit. Three of the singles also reached number one on Billboard's Hot R&B Songs chart. "My Prerogative" was also the second-biggest single of 1989, ranking at number two on the Billboard Year-End Hot 100 singles of 1989. The album also spent a total of 11 non-consecutive weeks at the top of the Billboard R&B Albums chart over the course of 1988 and 1989. Internationally, it reached number one in Ireland and the top five in Australia, New Zealand, and the United Kingdom.

At the 32nd Grammy Awards, Brown won Best Male R&B Vocal Performance for "Every Little Step". Don't Be Cruel received extremely positive reviews from music critics. It was far more successful than Brown's debut album, spending a total of six weeks on top of the Billboard 200 and being the best-selling album of 1989 in the United States. On April 28, 1995, it was certified 7× Platinum by the Recording Industry Association of America (RIAA). The album sold over 12 million copies worldwide in total. In 2015, Billboard ranked Don't Be Cruel at number 82 on its list of the Greatest of All Time Billboard 200 Albums.

The album received a 2-CD deluxe edition release commemorating its 35th anniversary on June 16, 2023, by Iconoclassic Records. This deluxe edition was subsequently removed from sale, for undisclosed reasons.

== Development ==
Brown changed producers for this album and worked extensively with hit-making songwriting and production duo Babyface and L.A. Reid. Alex Henderson of AllMusic writes:

Don't Be Cruel was to Bobby Brown what Control was to Janet Jackson – a tougher, more aggressive project that shed his "bubblegum" image altogether and brought him to a new artistic and commercial plateau. With "My Prerogative" and the title song, Brown became a leader of new jack swing – a forceful, high-tech blend of traditional soul singing and rap/hip-hop that's also associated with Guy and Brown's New Edition colleagues, Bell Biv DeVoe.

== Singles ==
All five singles released from the album reached the top 10 of the Billboard Hot 100. "Don't Be Cruel" was released as the lead single. The second single, "My Prerogative", earned Brown his first number one on the Billboard Hot 100. "My Prerogative" also reached number two on the Year-End Billboard Hot 100 Singles of 1989. Three of the singles also reached number one on Billboard's Hot R&B Songs chart.

All singles except "Roni" were certified Gold by the RIAA.

== Commercial performance ==
Don't Be Cruel debuted at number 74 on the Billboard 200 on July 23, 1988. It wasn't until six months later that the album reached number one, starting a six-week non-consecutive run at number one, from January 21, 1989 – February 4, 1989 and February 18, 1989 – March 4, 1989. Its reign at number one was interrupted for one week by Guns N' Roses' Appetite for Destruction.

The album also spent a total of 11 non-consecutive weeks atop the Billboard R&B/Hip-Hop Albums chart over the course of 1988 and 1989. It spent an eight-week non-consecutive run at number one from September–November 1988, and then returned to number one four months later in March 1989.

Don't Be Cruel was the best-selling album of 1989 in the United States, and finished number one on the Billboard Year-End album chart. Eventually the album sold 12 million copies worldwide in less than a decade.

== Track listing ==
All tracks are written by and produced by L.A. Reid and Babyface, except where noted.

Side one
No.	Title	Writer(s)	Producer(s)	Length
1.	"Cruel Prelude"			0:37
2.	"Don't Be Cruel"	Babyface; Reid; Daryl Simmons		6:48
3.	"My Prerogative"	Bobby Brown; Teddy Riley; Timmy Gatling; Aaron Hall	Riley; Brown (co.)	4:51
4.	"Roni"	Babyface; Darnell Bristol		5:58
5.	"Rock Wit'cha"			4:49

Side two
No.	Title	Writer(s)	Producer(s)	Length
6.	"Every Little Step"			3:57
7.	"I'll Be Good to You"	Brown; Riley; Gatling; Hall	Riley; Brown (co.)	4:25
8.	"Take It Slow"	Jay Logan; Lee Peters; Larry White	White	5:23
9.	"All Day All Night"	Dennis Wadington; DeWayne Sweet; White; Peters	White	4:40
10.	"I Really Love You Girl"	Brown; Gordon Jones	Jones; Brown (co.)	5:10
11.	"Cruel Reprise"			0:19
Total length:				47:08

== Personnel ==
Credits adapted from AllMusic.

- Richard Aguon – drum fills (8), drums (8,9), background vocals (8, 9)
- Babyface – mixing (1, 2, 4–6, 11), producer (1, 2, 4–6, 11), background vocals (2, 4–6)
- Bernard Belle – background vocals (2, 7)
- Ollie Bolds – background vocals (8, 9)
- Bobby Brown – primary artist, producer (3, 7, 10), background vocals (all tracks)
- Tommy Brown – finger snaps (8), production coordination
- Emilio Conesa – guitar (8)
- Kirk Crumpler – bass (8), synthesizer (8), synthesizer bass (8)
- Michael Denten – drum technician (8), engineer (8,9), mixing (8,9), background vocals (8, 9)
- Lee Drakeford – background vocals (2, 7)
- Don Emerson – assistant engineer (1, 2 4–6, 11)
- Jon Gass – engineer (6), mixing, special edits (1, 2, 4–6, 11)
- Mitch Gibson – engineer (10)
- Todd Gray – photography
- Toni Greene – assistant engineer (1, 2, 4–6, 11)
- Gene Griffin – producer (3, 7)
- Portia Griffin – background vocals (10)
- John Guggenheim – assistant engineer (1, 2, 4–6, 11)
- Aaron Hall – background vocals (3, 7)
- Timmy Gatling – composer (3, 7)
- Steve Hall – mastering
- Fred Howard – assistant engineer (1, 2, 4–6, 11)
- Ja – art direction
- Howard Johnston – engineer (8, 9)
- Gordon Jones – multi instruments (10), producer (10), background vocals (10)
- K2 – assistant engineer (8, 9)
- Kayo – guest artist, background vocals (2, 4, 6)
- Ruben Laxamana – engineer (8), special effects (8)
- Melecio Magdaluyo – soprano saxophone (8)
- Dennis Mitchell – engineer (2, 7), mixing (2, 7)
- Julie Moss – design
- Lee Peters – background vocals (8, 9)
- Ben Reyes – keyboards (8, 9)
- L.A. Reid – producer (1, 2, 4–6, 11)
- Markell Riley – drum programming (3, 7)
- Teddy Riley – keyboards (3, 7), mixing (3, 7), background vocals (3, 7)
- Percy Scott – keyboards (8, 9)
- Louil Silas Jr. – executive producer, remixing (9)
- Daryl Simmons – background vocals (2, 4–6)
- Mark Slagle – assistant engineer (8, 9)
- Dewayne Sweet – drums (8), keyboards (8, 9), synthesizer, synthesizer bass (8,9)
- Ralph Tresvant – background vocals
- Ronnie Watkins – background vocals (8)
- Karyn White – guest artist, background vocals (2, 4, 6)
- Larry White – Larry White – assistant engineer (8, 9), bass (8), drums (8), guitar (8), keyboards (8, 9), mixing (8, 9), producer (8, 9), background vocals (8)

== Charts ==
=== Weekly charts ===
Weekly chart performance for Don't Be Cruel
Chart (1988–1989)	Peak position
Australian Albums (ARIA)	5
Canada Top Albums/CDs (RPM)	10
Dutch Albums (Album Top 100)	27
European Albums (Music & Media)	13
German Albums (Offizielle Top 100)	26
New Zealand Albums (RMNZ)	2
Swedish Albums (Sverigetopplistan)	20
UK Albums (Official Charts)	3
US Billboard 200	1
US Top R&B/Hip-Hop Albums (Billboard)	1

=== Year-end charts ===
Year-end chart performance for Don't Be Cruel
Chart (1988)	Position
US Billboard 200	73
US Top R&B/Hip-Hop Albums (Billboard)	22

Chart (1989)	Position
Canada Top Albums/CDs (RPM)	10
European Albums (Music & Media)	44
New Zealand Albums (RMNZ)	5
UK Albums (Official Charts)	11
US Billboard 200	1
US Top R&B/Hip-Hop Albums (Billboard)	2

== Certifications ==
Certifications for Don't Be Cruel
Region	Certification	Certified units/sales
Australia (ARIA)	Platinum	70,000^{^}
Canada (Music Canada)	3× Platinum	300,000^{^}
New Zealand (RMNZ)	Gold	7,500^{‡}
Spain (Promusicae)	Gold	50,000^{^}
United Kingdom (BPI)	2× Platinum	600,000^{^}
United States (RIAA)	7× Platinum	7,000,000^{^}
^{^} Shipments figures based on certification alone.^{‡} Sales+streaming figures based on certification alone.

== See also ==
- List of number-one R&B albums of 1988 (U.S.)
- List of number-one R&B albums of 1989 (U.S.)
- List of number-one albums of 1989 (U.S.)
- Billboard Year-End
