= Final Goodbye =

Final Goodbye may refer to:

- "Final Goodbye", a 1994 song by Usher from Usher
- "Final Goodbye", a 2006 song by Rihanna from A Girl like Me
