= King of Stage =

Studio album by Bobby Brown
- Released: November 10, 1986
- Genres: R&B; soul; pop
- Length: 42:29
- Label: MCA
- Producers: Larry Blackmon; John Luongo

Bobby Brown chronology
King of Stage (1986)	Don't Be Cruel (1988)

Singles from King of Stage
- 1. "Girlfriend" Released: October 27, 1986; 2. "Girl Next Door" Released: February 9, 1987; 3. "Seventeen" Released: July 6, 1987

King of Stage is the debut solo album by American R&B singer Bobby Brown. Following his exit from New Edition, and at 16, Brown signed a solo deal with the group's label MCA Records, which had earlier promised Brown a solo deal if he decided to leave New Edition. His first solo album was released in 1986.

The album spawned the singles "Girlfriend", "Seventeen", and "Girl Next Door". None of the singles were major US Hot 100 hits, however, Brown had a number-one R&B hit with the first single, the ballad, "Girlfriend".

== Production ==
The album was produced by Larry Blackmon and John Luongo; Brown and Luongo produced the title track. Brown was unhappy with the production, and elected to go with proven producers for his next album.

== Reception ==
Professional ratings
Review scores
Source	Rating
AllMusic	3/5 stars
The Encyclopedia of Popular Music	2/5 stars
The Rolling Stone Album Guide	2.5/5 stars

AllMusic wrote that "as enjoyable as the Blackmon-produced tracks are, top honors must go to 'Seventeen' -- a riveting account of a teenage mother who turns to drugs and prostitution -- and the unapologetically sentimental, '70s-like soul ballad 'Girlfriend'." The Los Angeles Times called the album "an ill-conceived mess" marked by a "lack of focus, inconsistent production and mostly inferior material." The Boston Globe deemed it "a versatile blend of street funk, rap and ballads."

== Track listing ==
Side one
No.	Title	Writer(s)	Producer(s)	Length
1.	"Girlfriend"	Larry White; Lee Peters; Kirk Crumpler	White	6:16
2.	"Girl Next Door"	Melvin Wells	Larry Blackmon; Dave Ogrin^{[a]}; Keven Kendrick^{[a]}; Wells^{[a]}	4:08
3.	"Baby, I Wanna Tell You Something"	Nathan Leftenant; Tomi Jenkins; Blackmon	Blackmon; Ogrin^{[a]}; Kendrick^{[a]}; Wells^{[a]}	3:47
4.	"You Ain't Been Loved Right"	Michael Lovesmith	Lovesmith	5:07

Side two
No.	Title	Writer(s)	Producer(s)	Length
5.	"King of Stage"	Bobby Brown; Dr. Ice; Khris Kellow	John Luongo	5:07
6.	"Love Obsession"	Ian Legall; Steven Lindly; Richard Nuttal	Luongo	4:43
7.	"Spending Time"	Allen N. Jones	Blackmon; Ogrin^{[a]}; Mathew "Krash" Kasha^{[a]}; Michael Sauvage^{[a]}; Jon Wolfson^{[a]}	3:58
8.	"Seventeen"	Tony Haynes; Robert Brookins	Brookins; Louil Silas Jr.	4:17
9.	"Your Tender Romance"	Haynes; Paul M. Jackson Jr.	Jackson Jr.	5:10
Total length:				42:29

Notes

- ^{^[a]} signifies an associate producer.

== Personnel ==
- Bobby Brown – lead vocals, background vocals and vocal arrangements (9)
- Dina Andrews – production coordinator (9)
- Sue Ann – background vocals (8)
- Jerold Aquon – Simmons overdubs (1)
- Richard Aquon – background vocals (1)
- Maurice Bailey – scratching (5)
- Smooth Bee – background vocals (5)
- Olie Bowlds – background vocals (1)
- Robert Brookins – keyboards, drum programming, and background vocals (8)
- Patrick Buchanan – guitar (2)
- Kevin Choken – guitar (8)
- Emilio Conesa – guitar (1)
- Kirk Crumpler – bass synthesizer and keyboards (1)
- Michael Denten – engineer (1)
- Merv DePeyer – keyboards (3, 7)
- Angel Eve – background vocals (5)
- Gary Hellman – engineer (5, 6)
- Paul M. Jackson Jr. – vocal arrangements, rhythm arrangements, engineer, guitar, keyboards, bass guitar, drum programming, and background vocals (9)
- Tomi Jenkins – background vocals (2, 3, 7)
- Marlena Jeter – background vocals (4)
- Jilliann – background vocals (7)
- Mathew "Krash" Kasha – engineer (2, 3)
- Khris Kellow – arrangements, drum programming, and keyboards (5, 6), background vocals (6)
- Keven Kendrick – keyboards (3, 7), bass guitar (7)
- Marva King – background vocals (4)
- Debbe Kole – background vocals (6)
- Ruben Laxamana – assistant engineer (1)
- Victor Lee-Love – background vocals (5)
- Wayne Linsey – synthesizer programming (9)
- Jaee Logan – computer sequence programming and keyboards (1)
- Michael Lovesmith – arrangements, keyboards, drum machine, synthesizers, bass, horns, and background vocals (4)
- John Luongo – arrangements, mixing, and drum programming (5, 6)
- Melicio Magdaluyo – saxophone (1)
- Lance Romance Matthews – background vocals (5)
- Bill Miranda – assistant engineer (6)
- Willie Morris – background vocals (7)
- Taavi Moté – engineer (8), mixing (4)
- Dave Ogrin – engineer (2, 3), mixing (2, 3, 7)
- Lee Peters – background vocals (1)
- Jimmy Preziosi – assistant engineer (9)
- Roland Ramos – percussion (5, 6)
- Eric Rehl – keyboards (2, 3)
- David Rideau – engineer and mixing (9)
- Michael Sauvage – engineer (2, 3)
- Scopin Scott – background vocals (5)
- Lena Seinday – background vocals (8)
- Monty Seward – background vocals (9)
- Louil Silas Jr. – executive producer, mixing (8)
- Andrew Spiegelman – assistant engineer (5, 6)
- Melvin Wells – drum programming and keyboards (2), guitar (2, 7)
- Larry White – assistant engineer, mixing, bass guitar, guitar, percussion, keyboards, Simmons overdubs, and background vocals (1)
- Grady Wilkins – keyboards and background vocals (1)
- Alyson Williams – background vocals (2, 3, 7)
- Mark Wills – engineer (4)
- Jon Wolfson – engineer (2, 3)
- Bernard Wright – keyboards (3)

== Charts ==
Chart performance for King of Stage
Chart (1986)	Peak position
US Billboard Top Pop Albums	88
US Billboard Top R&B Albums	12

=== Singles ===
Chart performance for singles from King of Stage
Year	Single	Chart positions	
Year	Single	US Pop	US Soul
1986	"Girlfriend"	57	1
1987	"Girl Next Door"	—	31
1987	"Seventeen"	—	—
