= Poetic Justice (soundtrack) =

1993 soundtrack album by various artists

Poetic Justice: Music from the Motion Picture

Soundtrack album by Various artists
- Released: June 29, 1993
- Genres: Hip hop; R&B
- Length: 45:51
- Label: Epic Soundtrax
- Producers: Warren G; Babyface; Dallas Austin; Darryl Swann; Daryl Simmons; Derek "DOA" Allen; Dr. Dre; Henry Cosby; Kevin Deane; L.A. Reid; Naughty by Nature; Nice & Smooth; Pete Rock; Raphael Saadiq; Sly & Robbie; Stanley Clarke; Tim & Bob; Tim & Ted; Tupac Shakur

Singles from Poetic Justice: Music from the Motion Picture
- 1. "Get It Up" Released: June 6, 1993; 2. "Indo Smoke" Released: June 8, 1993; 3. "Call Me a Mack" Released: August 16, 1993

Professional ratings
Review scores
| Source | Rating |
|---|---|
| AllMusic | 2/5 stars |
| Los Angeles Times | 3/4 stars |
| Music Week | 2/5 stars |
| Philadelphia Inquirer | 3/4 stars |

Music from the Motion Picture Poetic Justice is the soundtrack to John Singleton's 1993 film Poetic Justice. It was released on June 29, 1993 through Epic Soundtrax and consisted of a blend of hip-hop and R&B music. The album peaked at number 23 on the Billboard 200 chart in the United States and was certified Gold by the Recording Industry Association of America on August 25, 1993.

Three charting singles were released from the album: "Indo Smoke" by Mista Grimm, "Get It Up" by TLC and "Call Me a Mack" by Usher, the latter of which was Usher's first official appearance on a song at the age of 14.

The soundtrack also has the Stevie Wonder song "Never Dreamed You'd Leave in Summer", a track that was originally on his 1971 Motown Records album Where I'm Coming From. The song "Definition of a Thug Nigga", recorded by Tupac Shakur for the film, later appeared on his 1997 posthumous album R U Still Down? (Remember Me).

== Track listing ==
| No. | Title | Writer(s) | Producer(s) | Length |
|---|---|---|---|---|
| 1. | "Get It Up" (performed by TLC) | Prince Nelson; Lisa "Left Eye" Lopes | Dallas Austin; Tim & Bob | 4:25 |
| 2. | "Indo Smoke" (performed by Mista Grimm, Warren G and Nate Dogg) | Rojai Trawick; Warren Griffin III | Warren G | 5:24 |
| 3. | "Well Alright" (performed by Babyface) | Kenneth Edmonds | Babyface; Daryl Simmons; L.A. Reid | 4:00 |
| 4. | "Call Me a Mack" (performed by Usher) | Usher Raymond IV; Teddy Bishop; Tim Thomas | Tim & Ted | 4:06 |
| 5. | "Waiting for You" (performed by Tony! Toni! Toné!) | Derek "DOA" Allen | Allen; Raphael Wiggins | 5:14 |
| 6. | "One in a Million" (performed by Pete Rock & CL Smooth) | Cory Penn; Peter O. Phillips; Eugene McDuff | Pete Rock | 4:05 |
| 7. | "Nite & Day" (performed by Cultural Revolution) | Darryl Swann; Cindy Walker; Pamela LeSean Williams | Swann | 5:04 |
| 8. | "Poor Man's Poetry" (performed by Naughty by Nature) | Anthony Criss; Keir Gist; Vincent Brown | Naughty by Nature | 2:59 |
| 9. | "I've Been Waiting" (performed by Terri & Monica) | Terri Robinson; Tara Geter; Kevin Deane | Deane | 4:20 |
| 10. | "Niggas Don't Give a Fuck" (performed by Tha Dogg Pound and The Lady of Rage) | Calvin Broadus; Delmar Arnaud; Ricardo Brown | Dr. Dre | 4:41 |
| 11. | "Definition of a Thug Nigga" (performed by 2Pac) | Tupac Shakur; Griffin III; Larry Mizell | Warren G; 2Pac | 4:10 |
| 12. | "I Wanna Be Your Man" (performed by Chaka Demus & Pliers) | Everton Bonner; John Taylor; Lloyd Willis; Robbie Shakespeare; Lowell Dunbar | Sly & Robbie | 3:54 |
| 13. | "Cash in My Hands" (performed by Nice & Smooth) | Darryl Barnes; Greg Mays | Nice & Smooth | 3:52 |
| 14. | "Never Dreamed You'd Leave in Summer" (performed by Stevie Wonder) | Stephen Morris; Syreeta Wright | Henry Cosby | 2:54 |
| 15. | "Justice's Groove" (performed by Stanley Clarke) | Stanley Clarke | Clarke | 4:34 |
| Total length: | | | | 45:51 |

Notes

- "One in a Million" contains samples from "Electric Surfboard" performed by Brother Jack McDuff
- "Definition of a Thug Nigga" contains samples from "Wind Parade" performed by Donald Byrd

=== Other songs ===
There are fourteen songs that appeared in the film but were not released on the soundtrack album:

- "Rhapsody in Blue", written by George Gershwin.
- "Bonita Applebum (Hootie Mix)", written by Jonathan William Davis, Ali Shaheed Jones-Muhammad, O'Kelly Isley, Ronald Isley, Rudolph Isley, Ernie Isley, Marvin Isley and Chris Jasper, and performed by A Tribe Called Quest
- "Between the Sheets", written by O'Kelly Isley, Ronald Isley, Rudolph Isley, Ernie Isley, Marvin Isley and Chris Jasper, and performed by The Isley Brothers
- "Smoking Sticks", "Can a Corn" and "Sticky Fingers", written by Artis Ivey Jr. and Bryan "Wino" Dobbs, and performed by Coolio
- "Felix the Wonderful Cat", written by Winston Sharples
- "Life Betta", written by Sean Reveron, Julian Harker and Osagyefu Kennedy, and performed by Ruffneck
- "Gangsta Bitch", written by Anthony Peaks and Jonathan William Davis
- "Stand by Your Man", written by Billy Sherrill and Tammy Wynette, and performed by Tammy Wynette
- "Family Reunion", written by Kenneth Gamble and Leon Huff, and performed by The O'Jays
- "Niggers Are Scared of Revolution", written by Omar Ben Hassan, and performed by The Last Poets
- "Back Stabbers", written by Leon Huff, Gene McFadden and John Whitehead, and performed by The O'Jays
- "Again", written by Janet Jackson, James Harris III and Terry Lewis, and performed by Janet Jackson

== Personnel ==
- Carlton Batts – mastering
- Paris Davis – associate producer
- Vivian Scott – associate producer
- John Singleton – executive producer, liner notes
- Glen Brunman – executive producer
- Paul Stewart – music supervisor
- David Coleman – art direction
- Eli Reed – photography

== Charts ==
| Chart (1993) | Peak position |
|---|---|
| US Billboard 200 | 23 |
| US Top R&B/Hip-Hop Albums | 19 |

== Certifications ==
| Region | Certification | Certified units/sales |
|---|---|---|
| United States (RIAA) | Gold | 500,000^{^} |
^{^} Shipments figures based on certification alone.
