= Rose Weaver =

American dramatist

- Occupations: Actor, playwright, director, songwriter, vocalist
- Years active: 1973–present
- Website: roseweaver.com

Rose Weaver is an American actress, singer, director and writer in Rhode Island. Weaver is described as a "major figure in Rhode Island entertainment," and she is known for her role in the film Poetic Justice.

== Early life ==
Weaver grew up in McDonough outside of Atlanta, Georgia. Her family were sharecroppers. She was one of the first black people to attend Joseph Emerson Brown High School, an all-white high school in Atlanta, Georgia and participated in the Emory University Upward Bound program in her youth.

== Career ==
Weaver began singing in Boston and Rhode Island clubs in the 1970s. She graduated from Wheaton College in 1973 and was awarded a three-year fellowship by Trinity Repertory in 1973. She spent 11 seasons acting at Trinity, including roles as Silvia in Two Gentleman of Verona, Dussie Mae in Ma Rainey's Black Bottom, and Billie Holiday in Lady Sings the Blues. In 1994, she returned to Trinity in 1994 for another 11 seasons, taking roles such as the Witch in Into the Woods and Billie Holiday in Lady Day at Emerson's Bar and Grill. In addition to her time at Trinity, Weaver was the producer and host of the television program "Sunday Sunday" on WJAR TV in the 1980s.

In 1993 she played Aunt Audrey in the film Poetic Justice alongside Janet Jackson and Tupac Shakur.

Weaver continues to act, sing, write and direct. She performed at the state inauguration in Rhode Island, 1999. In 2000, she earned a Master of Fine Arts degree in Creative Writing from Brown University. She was an artist in residence at Brown University's Rites and Reason Theatre in 2015 where she developed her play about Alzheimer's disease and memory, Skips The Record. Her play Menopause Mama, which she wrote, directed and starred in toured internationally and earned her a fellowship in play writing at the Rhode Island State Council for the Arts in 2017. In 2022, her play Silhouette of a Silhouette, a semi-autobiographical play, received its world premiere at the Wilbury Theatre Group in Providence.

== Awards and distinctions ==
2019, Rhode Island Heritage Hall of Fame

2018, Rhode Island Woman of the Year, GoLocalProv

2018, Wheeler School Community Spirit Award

2018, Honorary Doctorate of Fine Arts, Wheaton College

2016, Honorary Doctorate of Fine Arts, Providence College

2002, Honorary Doctorate of Fine Arts, Marymount Manhattan College

2001, Rhode Island Historical Society History Makers

2000, Pell Award for Excellence in the Arts

1991, "Who's Who in Rhode Island Jazz"

1973, Miss Massachusetts - Miss Congeniality

1973, Miss Foxboro

== Selected film and television roles ==
A Snow White Christmas, 2018, Mrs. Woods

Brotherhood, 2006, Mrs. Lynch

Poetic Justice, 1993, Aunt Audrey

Tales From The Crypt, "Mute Witness to Murder", 1990, Desk

The Accused, 1988, Nurse

Go Tell It On The Mountain, 1984

In the Heat of the Night, 1989

Brother to Dragons, Great Performances, 1975, Family Slave

== Published works ==
"Mama's Helper" and "Chips on My Shoulder", Monologues for Women by Women, Tori Haring-Smith ed., 1994

NuMuse: an anthology of plays from Brown University's New Plays Festival, 1994
