= Poetic Justice (film) =

1993 film directed by John Singleton

- Theatrical release poster
- Directed by: John Singleton
- Written by: John Singleton
- Produced by: John Singleton; Steve Nicolaides
- Starring: Janet Jackson; Tupac Shakur; Tyra Ferrell; Regina King; Joe Torry
- Cinematography: Peter Lyons Collister
- Edited by: Bruce Cannon
- Music by: Stanley Clarke
- Production companies: Columbia Pictures; New Deal Productions; Nickel
- Distributed by: Sony Pictures Releasing
- Release date: July 23, 1993
- Running time: 109 minutes
- Country: United States
- Language: English
- Budget: $14 million
- Box office: $27.5 million

Poetic Justice is a 1993 American romantic crime drama film written and directed by John Singleton. Its plot follows Justice, a poet (Janet Jackson) mourning the loss of her boyfriend Markell (Q-Tip) from gun violence, who goes on a road trip from South Los Angeles to Oakland in a mail truck, along with her friend Iesha (Regina King) and postal workers Lucky (Tupac Shakur) and Chicago (Joe Torry), in order to deal with depression.

Following the success of his debut film, Boyz n the Hood, Singleton decided to make a film that would focus on young African-American women. Jada Pinkett, Lisa Bonet, Monica Calhoun and many other popular actresses auditioned for the role of Justice, though Singleton knew from the script's draft that the role was solely intended for Jackson.

Filmed between April 11 and July 4, 1992, Poetic Justice was released in the United States on July 23, 1993 to mixed reviews from critics, who criticized the screenplay but praised Jackson's and Shakur's performances and chemistry. It topped the box office in its opening weekend, grossing $11,728,455, and eventually grossed a total of $27,515,786. Jackson received Academy Award and Golden Globe nominations for Best Original Song for "Again", which also reached number one on the Billboard Hot 100, as well as two MTV Movie Awards for her role in the film, including Most Desirable Female. The film has developed a cult following, especially for the chemistry between Jackson and Shakur.

== Plot ==
Justice is a young African American woman living in South Central, Los Angeles, named by her deceased mother who became pregnant with her while attending law school. After her boyfriend Markell is fatally shot while they are on an outing at a drive-in movie, Justice becomes deeply depressed and scared, spending most of her time with her cat named Whiteboy in the house that she inherited from her grandmother and only venturing outdoors to commute to her job at a local beauty salon. A talented poet, she reads many of her poems to others.

While Justice is working at the salon one day, a postal clerk named Lucky arrives and attempts to charm her. She and her female boss Jessie rebuff his advances, taunting him with their lesbian-esque "relationship". He has also suffered from tragic events, as he had to forcibly remove his young daughter Keisha, the main focus in his life, from the presence of her mother Angel, his former girlfriend who was addicted to crack cocaine and having sexual intercourse with her drug dealer while leaving Keisha unattended in the apartment. He dreams of a professional career in music and shows considerable promise but insists that his cousin Kalil is the true talent.

Justice's friend Iesha coaxes her into an excursion to Oakland with her own boyfriend Chicago, Lucky's co-worker. Justice warily acquiesces, mainly because she is obliged to attend a hair show in the area and her automobile had malfunctioned at the last minute. Unbeknownst to her, Lucky has provided a postal van for the group to travel in and she is displeased about having to share it with him and their two mutual friends. The pair soften their initial animosity towards each other as they gradually discover their similarities.

The quartet makes several detours during their trek; at a family reunion barbecue, they pose incognito as cousins. Iesha and Chicago's troubled relationship becomes apparent although there were ample hints earlier, as Iesha openly flirts with another man at the barbecue and Chicago broods watching her behavior. The couple argues in the mail truck until Justice reveals Iesha's issues with alcohol. Iesha vomits and tearfully apologizes to her, promising to obtain treatment.

At the next stop, an African marketplace and cultural fair, Lucky and Justice bond over a heartfelt discussion of their respective lives. Next, they stop at a beach, contemplating their separate situations in internal monologues. Afterward, the friction between Chicago and Iesha explodes when Iesha informs him that she has been seeing someone on the side, and he assaults her. Lucky initially decides to abstain until Justice defends Iesha by kicking Chicago in the groin, who retaliatorily attacks her. Lucky incapacitates Chicago and he, Justice and a bleeding and shaken Iesha abandon him.

Further up the coast at a scenic lookout, Justice discloses her past to a sympathetic Lucky, including her grandmother's passing two years earlier as well as her mother's suicide when she was 12. Upon the trio's arrival in Oakland, Lucky reveals Keisha's existence to Justice but before she can respond, he notices ambulances outside his aunt Audrey's residence, discovering that Kalil, with whom he had been working on recording music, has been shot and killed. Blaming himself for not being available sooner as he could have prevented the shooting, he drops Justice and Iesha off at a nearby motel and berates Justice for distracting him during their journey. Jessie visits Justice and Iesha at the motel before the hair show and advises them about men. Lucky's uncle Earl and Audrey give him Kalil's recording equipment, inspiring him to quit his job and focus on both his recording career and Keisha.

Months later, Lucky, having gained full custody of Keisha, re-encounters Justice at the beauty salon, introducing her to Keisha. Remorseful over his cruel conduct towards Justice in Oakland, he apologizes. She smiles at him coyly and they passionately kiss before she turns to focus on Keisha's hair. Justice's and Lucky's eyes meet over Keisha's head and they smile at each other, as strongly connected as ever.

== Cast ==
- Janet Jackson as Justice, a poet and hairdresser
- Tupac Shakur as Lawrence "Lucky", a letter carrier and aspiring rapper
- Regina King as Iesha, Justice's friend
- Joe Torry as "Chicago"
- Tyra Ferrell as Jessie
- Rose Weaver as Aunt Audrey
- Billy Zane as Brad (Opening Movie)
- Lori Petty as Penelope (Opening Movie)
- Khandi Alexander as Simone
- John Cothran Jr. as Uncle Earl
- Maya Angelou as Aunt June
- Norma Donaldson as Aunt May
- Jenifer Lewis as Anne, Lucky's Mother
- Maia Campbell as Shante
- René Elizondo Jr. as E.J.
- Clifton Collins Jr. as Kareem LaVine
- Tone Loc as James Paul A.K.A. Bone
- Ricky Harris as Gangsta
- Q-Tip as Markell, Justice's boyfriend
- Keith Washington as Dexter
- Roger Guenveur Smith as Heywood
- Michael Colyar as Panhandler
- Baha Jackson as Baha
- The Last Poets as themselves

== Production ==
On July 23, 2013, John Singleton spoke with writer Lathleen Ade-Brown for Essence magazine and discussed the 20th anniversary of the film. The interview mentioned that in 1993, black female leads were rare and he wanted to give a voice to young African American women. He also revealed whose idea it was for Janet Jackson to wear the now iconic box braids: "That was a collaboration between myself, Janet, [dance choreographer] Fatima Robinson and a dancer named Jossie Harris. Jossie had the braids in Michael Jackson’s "Remember the Time" video. I brought her and Fatima and a couple of other dancers over to hang out with Janet and they all became friends. I said, "Why don't we try and do Janet's hair like Jossie's hair?" We got the hairstyle from Harlem and just put it in a West Coast movie."

Jada Pinkett, Lisa Bonet, Monica Calhoun, and many other popular actresses auditioned for the role of Justice, though Singleton knew from the script's draft that the role was intended for Jackson. Rapper and actor Ice Cube was offered the lead role of Lucky, but declined to play the role, stating that he was not in a point in his career that he would play in romantic films. Filming began on April 14 and ended on July 4, 1992.

== Release ==
The film opened on July 23, 1993 in the United States. Cineplex Odeon did not release the film at the Universal CityWalk Hollywood theater, due to the fear of violence. Rita Walters called Cineplex Odeon's decision racist and they agreed to delay the release until July 28. Around the country, five violent incidents occurred around theaters during the film's opening weekend, including a killing outside a Las Vegas theater.

== Reception ==
=== Box office ===
Poetic Justice made $27,515,786 in the domestic box office, against a production budget of $14 million. For its opening weekend it opened at number one at the US box office with over $11,700,000 in ticket sales. It ranked 20th for the year of 1993 openings and 21st for highest R-rated films of 1993.

=== Critical reception ===
Upon its release, Poetic Justice received mostly mixed reviews with most critics comparing it unfavorably to Singleton's debut film Boyz n the Hood. Much of the acclaim was directed to the performances by both Jackson and Shakur, with criticism stemming from the writing. On Rotten Tomatoes the film has a 34% rating based on 32 reviews. The site's consensus states: "Poetic Justice is commendably ambitious and boasts a pair of appealing stars, but they're undermined by writer-director John Singleton's frustrating lack of discipline." On Metacritic, the film has a score of 51% based on reviews from 21 critics, indicating "mixed or average reviews". Audiences surveyed by CinemaScore gave the film a grade "B+" on scale of A to F.

Roger Ebert: "...Boyz n the Hood was one of the most powerful and influential films of its time, in 1991. Poetic Justice is not its equal, but does not aspire to be; it is a softer, gentler film, more of a romance than a commentary on social conditions." He also stated, "...Poetic Justice unwinds like a road picture from the early 1970s, in which the characters are introduced and then set off on a trip that becomes a journey of discovery. By the end of the film, Justice will have learned to trust and love again, and Shakur will have learned how to listen to a woman. And all of the characters - who in one way or another lack families - will begin to get a feeling for the larger African/American family to which they belong. The scene where that takes place is one of the best in the film." Leonard Klady of Variety stated: "Though aiming to create a feel for the locale, Singleton periodically loses sight of audiences unfamiliar with the colorful lingo. Poetic Justice has a lot to commend, but discipline is not high on the list. That flaw will be a major stumbling block toward wide appeal, and overseas prospects seem particularly remote." Kenneth Turan of the Los Angeles Times called the film "a disappointment", but praised Singleton for his skills, and suggested: "A filmmaker who is adept at saying what’s on his mind, he will do better when he finds something he truly wants to say." Peter Travers of Rolling Stone criticized the film for "wrong turns and right-minded preachiness", but praised the young director saying: "If Singleton, 25, stumbles, it is over ambition and not the complacency of a new Hollywood hotshot riding a trend." Vincent Canby of The New York Times wrote: "Although its aspirations are high, the film works only fitfully when Mr. Singleton exercises his gift for vernacular speech, for finding the comic undertow in otherwise tragic situations, and even for parody." Owen Gleiberman of Entertainment Weekly gave it a C− grade. Richard Schickel of Time panned the film, saying: "What must be said is that the new movie is simply awful: poorly structured, vulgarly written, insipidly directed, monotonously performed."

Despite the mixed reviews from contemporary film critics, the film has come to be considered one of Singleton's most enduring films. In retrospect, Singleton described Poetic Justice "as a more relaxed and fun experience" compared to Boyz n the Hood. He said that "while Boyz was filled with pressure, he just had a good time making Justice, hanging out with friends like Jackson and Shakur". He never tried to send a deep message with the film. He just wanted to enjoy the process and have fun with people he cared about.

Bilge Ebiri, in his article for Vulture, describes Poetic Justice as a daring and complex film, contrasting it with Boyz n the Hood's more traditional structure. He praises the performances of Jackson and Shakur, particularly highlighting a moment where Justice critiques Lucky's dirty nails, mixing anger, affection, and confusion. The film's tone shifts between comedy, romance, and tragedy, with moments of violence tempered by poetry, embodying the contradictions at its core. Ebiri also humorously notes that Jackson was nominated for a Golden Raspberry Award, despite her standout performance.

=== Accolades ===
Award	Category	Nominee(s)	Result	Ref.
Academy Awards	Best Original Song	"Again"; Music and Lyrics by Janet Jackson, Jimmy Jam and Terry Lewis	Nominated	
ASCAP Film and Television Music Awards	Most Performed Songs from Motion Pictures	"Again"; Music and Lyrics by Janet Jackson, Jimmy Jam and Terry Lewis	Won	
Golden Globe Awards	Best Original Song	"Again"; Music and Lyrics by Janet Jackson, Jimmy Jam and Terry Lewis	Nominated	
Golden Raspberry Awards	Worst Actress	Janet Jackson	Nominated	
Golden Raspberry Awards	Worst New Star	Janet Jackson	Won	
MTV Movie Awards	Best Female Performance	Janet Jackson	Won	
MTV Movie Awards	Most Desirable Female	Janet Jackson	Won	
NAACP Image Awards	Outstanding Actor in a Motion Picture	Tupac Shakur	Nominated	
NAACP Image Awards	Outstanding Actress in a Motion Picture	Janet Jackson	Nominated	

== Home media ==
Poetic Justice was released on VHS and LaserDisc in 1994, DVD in 1999 and Blu-ray in 2019. It was released on Blu-ray and Ultra HD Blu-ray by The Criterion Collection in April 2026 in the "John Singleton’s Hood Trilogy" set with Boyz n the Hood and Baby Boy.

== Soundtrack ==
The soundtrack album was released on June 29, 1993, through Epic Soundtrax, and consisted of a blend of hip-hop and R&B music. It peaked at number 23 on the Billboard 200 chart in the United States and was certified Gold by the Recording Industry Association of America on August 25, 1993. Three charting singles were released from the album: "Indo Smoke" by Mista Grimm, "Get It Up" by TLC, and "Call Me a Mack" by Usher. Recorded at Unique Recording Studios, New York City

The soundtrack also has the Stevie Wonder song "Never Dreamed You'd Leave in Summer", a track that was originally on his 1970 album Where I'm Coming From. The song "Definition of a Thug Nigga", recorded by Tupac Shakur for the film, later appeared on his 1997 posthumous album R U Still Down? (Remember Me).
