= Girlfriend (Bobby Brown song) =

Single by Bobby Brown

from the album King of Stage
- B-side: "King of Stage - Extended version"
- Released: October 14, 1986
- Recorded: 1986
- Genre: Soul
- Length: 6:16
- Label: MCA
- Songwriter(s): Kirk Crumpler, Lee Peters, Larry White
- Producer(s): Larry White

Bobby Brown singles chronology
"Girlfriend" (1986)	"Girl Next Door" (1987)

"Girlfriend" is the debut solo single by R&B singer Bobby Brown. After being kicked out of his former group New Edition, Brown released his first album, King of Stage, from which the single was taken. The single reached #1 on the R&B charts for two weeks and peaked at #57 on Billboard's Hot 100.

== Track listing ==
=== A-Side ===
1. "Girlfriend - Extended version" (6:16)

=== B-Side ===
1. "King of Stage - Extended version" (7:15)

== Charts ==
Chart (1986–87)	Peak position
U.S. Billboard Hot 100	57
U.S. Billboard Hot R&B/Hip-Hop Songs	1
