= My Way (Usher album) =

Studio album by Usher
- Released: September 16, 1997
- Genre: R&B
- Length: 40:21
- Labels: LaFace; Arista
- Producers: Babyface; Jermaine Dupri; Manuel Seal; Sprague "Doogie" Williams

Usher chronology
Usher (1994)	My Way (1997)	Live (1999)

Singles from My Way
- 1. "You Make Me Wanna..." Released: August 5, 1997; 2. "Nice & Slow" Released: January 6, 1998; 3. "My Way" Released: June 9, 1998

My Way is the second studio album by American singer Usher. It was released on September 16, 1997, by LaFace Records in North America. Serving as the follow-up to his self-titled debut album (1994), which had spawned the modest single "Think of You" but failed to gain much commercial success, My Way underwent several creative iterations before fellow Atlanta native Jermaine Dupri assumed the role of primary and executive producer. This shift allowed Usher to take a more active role in the album's conception, while also collaborating with Babyface, Sprague "Doogie" Williams, and guest artists Monica and Lil' Kim.

The album received generally positive reviews, with critics praising Usher's vocal performance and the overall production, though some highlighted inconsistency in quality, an overabundance of downtempo tracks, and uneven songwriting. Commercially, My Way marked Usher’s breakthrough into mainstream R&B: it debuted at number 15 on the US Billboard 200 with first-week sales of 66,000 copies and eventually peaked at number four. It also topped the Top R&B/Hip-Hop Albums chart for three consecutive weeks, achieved seven-times platinum certification, and has sold over seven million copies worldwide.

The album was supported by three singles, all of which became hits and were certified platinum, including "You Make Me Wanna...", "Nice & Slow", and the title track, with the first earning Usher a nomination for the Grammy Award for Best Male R&B Vocal Performance. My Way also received a Male Album of the Year nomination at the 1998 Billboard Music Awards. To further promote the album, Usher served as an opening act for Mary J. Blige on her Share My World Tour and for Janet Jackson on The Velvet Rope Tour. In 2022, to commemorate the album’s 25th anniversary, he released a digital deluxe edition of the album.

== Background ==
In August 1994, LaFace and Arista Records released Usher's self-titled debut album. The record peaked at number 167 on the US Billboard 200 and, although it ultimately sold more than 500,000 copies, its initial commercial performance was modest. Of its three singles, the second release, "Think of You," became the album's only top-ten hit on the R&B chart. Executive produced by Sean "Puffy" Combs, who largely shaped the album's overall sound, the project received mixed reviews from music critics, with some observers noting that its lyrics were unusually explicit for a 14-year-old performer. Although it partially achieved LaFace head L.A. Reid's aim of presenting Usher with a more mature, edgier image rather than immediately positioning him as a hit-driven artist, in later interviews, Usher expressed dissatisfaction with the album, stating that it did not accurately reflect his artistic identity and attributing its direction to prevailing industry trends rather than his personal vision.

== Conception ==
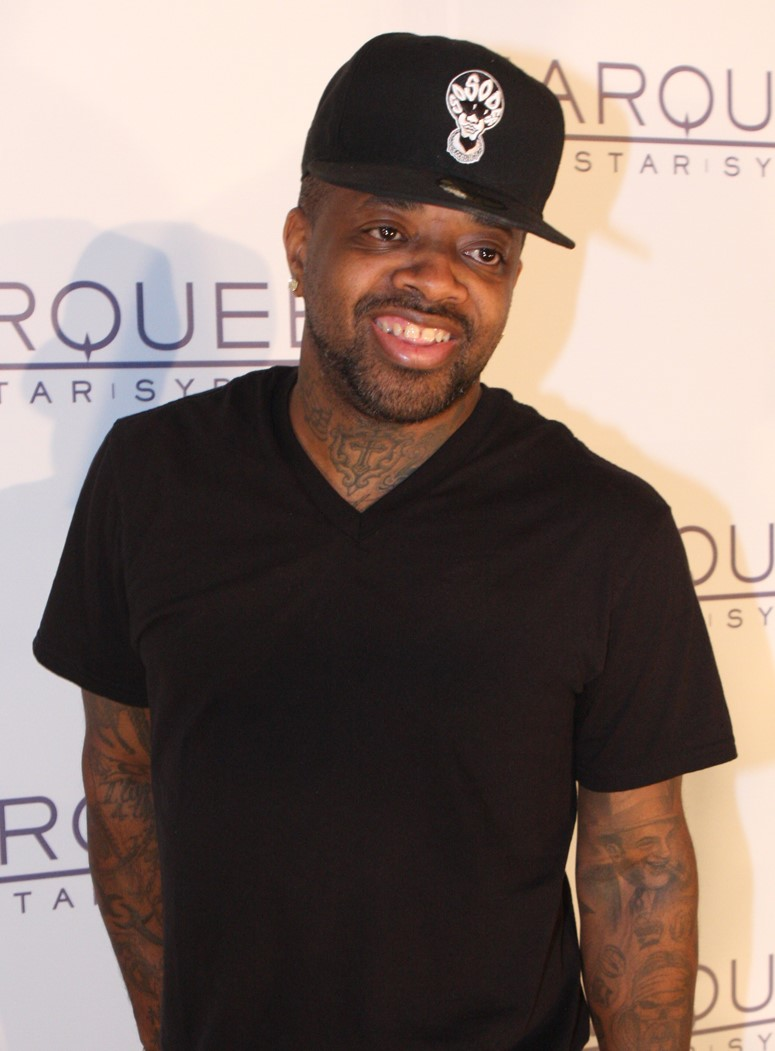
Jermaine Dupri (pictured) served as My Way's primary and executive producer.

For his follow-up project with the label, Usher pursued a new artistic direction, seeking a sound that was more “raw and authentic” than his debut album, while also feeling the urgency to build on what he considered a make-or-break moment in his career. As he was going through puberty and experiencing changes in his voice, he was determined to establish himself more fully as an entertainer on his second album, creating material that would highlight both his vocal growth and his abilities as a performer and dancer. At the same time, he sought a more active role in the storytelling of his music, moving away from recording impersonal songs written solely by others.

Reid initially brought in Dallas Austin, with whom Usher had previously collaborated on a remake of the Latimore song "Let's Straighten It Out" for the soundtrack of the 1995 film Panther, to work on Usher's second album. However, finding Austin’s material lacking the necessary "magic," Reid ultimately shelved the recordings. As the label explored several options for the project, Usher was nearly dropped before Reid introduced Jermaine Dupri to collaborate with him. Although the two had met several years earlier, My Way marked the first official collaboration between Usher and Dupri. They developed an immediate, brotherly rapport, and Usher temporarily moved in with Dupri to get to know each other better while focusing on recording new material.

During this period, Dupri emphasized an active listening approach, closely capturing Usher's intentions rather than dictating the direction of the music. Their time together in and out of the studio allowed them to craft songs that reflected Usher’s personal experiences, rather than relying on pre-existing material. While Usher had contributed to songwriting on his debut album, he played a significantly larger role on My Way, feeling "confident enough to do it." The pair initially completed four songs, but at the request of L.A. Reid, head of LaFace, they returned to the studio to produce additional tracks, resulting in further recordings, including "You Make Me Wanna...." Dupri, along with Manuel Seal, ended up co-writing and producing six songs on My Way. Apart from Dupri, who ultimately served as the album's primary and executive producer, Usher also collaborated with Babyface, Sprague "Doogie" Williams, and Tim & Bob on the project.

== Critical reception ==
Professional ratings
Review scores
Source	Rating
AllMusic	4/5 stars
Christgau's Consumer Guide	(1-star Honorable Mention)
Los Angeles Times	2.5/4 stars
Music Week	5/5 stars
Q	4/5 stars
The Rolling Stone Album Guide	3.5/5 stars
Sydney Morning Herald	5/5 stars

Upon its release, My Way received largely positive reviews, with praise directed at Usher's matured voice, and standout tracks such as "You Make Me Wanna...," although some criticism targeted its abundance of downtempo songs and uneven writing. Ann Powers of The New York Times wrote that My Way delivered "only the highest-quality rhythm-and-blues," adding that what set Usher apart from other contemporary soul singers was his nerve and the swagger behind his sexual bravado and the vulnerability he revealed when pleading for affection. Sydney Morning Herald critic Mary Tartaglione praised My Way, highlighting his matured voice, confidence, and youthful energy, and noting that, the album's standout tracks established him as a rising musical force. Music Week described the record as "effortlessly soulful R&B" and awarded it five out of five stars.

Robert Christgau, writing in The Village Voice, identified "Just Like Me" and "You Make We Wanna..." as highlights, quipping that Usher was "the sweetest nonvirgin a mama could ask". He gave My Way a one-star honorable mention, signifying "a worthy effort consumers attuned to its overriding aesthetic or individual vision may well like." The Source stated that with My Way, "Usher proves that he's aiming to become more than just R&B music's best kept secret". Asondra R. Hunter of Vibe wrote that Usher was "sensual through his mild and gentle tone and tasteful, refined lyrics." In a mixed review for Rolling Stone, David Fricke criticized the album for its abundance of downtempo material and took issue with aspects of the songwriting and production.

In a retrospective review for AllMusic, Stephen Thomas Erlewine gave My Way four out of five stars and praised Usher's vocal restraint, but noted inconsistency in quality. In a 2002 review, Q magazine also gave it four stars and wrote that it established Usher's reputation as a young and skillful performer of R&B slow jams. Keith Harris, writing in The Rolling Stone Album Guide (2004), gave it three-and-a-half stars and said that, although Dupri's combination of hi-hat hits, acoustic-guitar arpeggios, and occasional guest raps from him and Lil Kim can inhibit the album, My Way was the work of a significant, enterprising artist. Yahoo! Music's Billy Johnson Jr. credited the album for Usher's breakthrough into the music industry, and lauded the production of the three singles.

=== Accolades ===
Publication	Accolade	Rank	Ref.
Complex	The Best R&B Albums of '90s	36	

== Commercial performance ==
My Way solidified Usher's status as a major force in R&B, achieving significant commercial success in the United States and internationally. In the United States, the album debuted at number 15 on the Billboard 200 dated October 4, 1997, with first-week sales of 66,000 copies, eventually peaking at number four. It simultaneously entered the Top R&B/Hip-Hop Albums chart at number four and later climbed to number one on January 10, 1998, where it remained for three consecutive weeks and spent a total of seventy-five weeks on the chart. It was initially certified six-times platinum by the Recording Industry Association of America (RIAA) for sales of over six million copies in the United States. By 2002, it had sold six million copies domestically, and in September 2022, it was upgraded to seven-times platinum, marking seven million units sold in the US alone.

Elsewhere, My Way scored Usher his first chart entries on the album charts. It peaking at number 13 in Canada, number 16 in the United Kingdom, number 20 in Switzerland, number 21 in New Zealand, number 30 in the Netherlands, number 37 in Australia, number 38 in France, number 41 in Germany, and number 56 in Sweden, while also reaching number one on the Canada R&B Albums and number three on the UK R&B Albums chart. Its international sales earned certifications such as 2× Platinum in Canada (200,000 units), Gold in Australia (35,000 units), the Netherlands (50,000 units), and the UK (100,000 units).

== Track listing ==
My Way track listing
No.	Title	Writer(s)	Producer	Length
1.	"You Make Me Wanna..."	Jermaine Dupri; Manuel Seal; Usher Raymond	Dupri; Seal^{[a]}	3:39
2.	"Just Like Me" (featuring Lil' Kim)	Dupri; Seal; Kimberly Jones	Dupri; Seal^{[a]}	3:26
3.	"Nice & Slow"	Dupri; Seal; Raymond; Brian Casey	Dupri; Seal^{[a]}	3:48
4.	"Slow Jam" (featuring Monica)	Babyface; Boaz Watson; Belinda Lipscomb; Sidney Johnson	Babyface	4:43
5.	"My Way"	Dupri; Seal; Raymond	Dupri; Seal^{[a]}	3:35
6.	"Come Back" (featuring Jermaine Dupri)	Dupri; Seal; Raymond; Joe Cocker; Chris Stainton	Dupri; Seal^{[a]}	3:47
7.	"I Will"	Sprague "Doogie" Williams; Chauncey Hannibal; Sherri Blair; Eric Williams	Williams	3:55
8.	"Bedtime"	Babyface	Babyface	4:45
9.	"One Day You'll Be Mine"	Dupri; Seal; Raymond; Ronald Isley; Marvin Isley; Ernie Isley; Rudolph Isley; O'Kelly Isley; Chris Jasper	Dupri; Seal^{[a]}	3:23
10.	"You Make Me Wanna..." (Extended Version)	Dupri; Seal; Raymond	Dupri; Seal^{[a]}	5:19
Total length:				40:20

25th Anniversary Edition – bonus tracks
No.	Title	Writer(s)	Producer	Length
11.	"You Make Me Wanna..." (Ryan James Carr remake)	Dupri; Seal; Raymond	Dupri; Seal^{[a]}; Ryan James Carr^{[b]}; Justus West^{[b]}	3:02
12.	"Nice & Slow" (Ryan James Carr remake)	Dupri; Seal; Raymond; Casey	Dupri; Seal^{[a]}; Carr^{[b]}; West^{[b]}; Trevor Welch^{[b]}; Kevin Dailey^{[b]}	3:12
13.	"My Way" (Ryan James Carr remake)	Dupri; Seal; Raymond	Dupri; Seal^{[a]}; Carr^{[a]}; CARRTOONS^{[a]}	3:32
14.	"You Make Me Wanna..." (Ryan James Carr remake – instrumental)	Dupri; Seal; Raymond	Dupri; Seal^{[a]}; Carr^{[b]}; West^{[b]}	3:02
15.	"Nice & Slow" (Ryan James Carr remake – instrumental)	Dupri; Seal; Raymond; Casey	Dupri; Seal^{[a]}; Carr^{[b]}; West^{[b]}; Welch^{[b]}; Dailey^{[b]}	3:12
16.	"My Way" (Ryan James Carr remake - instrumental)	Dupri; Seal; Raymond	Dupri; Seal^{[a]}; Carr^{[a]}; CARRTOONS^{[a]}	3:32
Total length:				59:55

Notes

- A tour edition of My Way, issued in Australian and New Zealand, features Live (1999) as a bonus disc.
- ^{^[a]} denotes co-producer(s)

Sample credits

- "Come Back" contains a sample of "Woman to Woman" by Joe Cocker.
- "One Day You'll Be Mine" contains a sample of "Footsteps in the Dark" by The Isley Brothers.

== Personnel ==
Credits are adapted from Allmusic and album's liner notes.

- Babyface – executive producer; producer, background vocals, keyboards, and drum programming (tracks 4, 8); bass (track 4)
- Butch BelAir – photography
- Michael Benabib – photography
- Kyle Bess – mixing assistant (tracks 4, 8)
- Paul Boutin – engineer (tracks 4, 8)
- Trina Broussard – background vocals (track 9)
- Jermaine Dupri – executive producer, producer (tracks 1–3, 5, 6, 9, 10), mixing (tracks 2, 3, 5, 6, 9), instruments (tracks 1, 10), background vocals
- Nathan East – bass (track 8)
- Brian Frye – mixing assistant (tracks 1–3, 5, 6, 9, 10)
- John Frye – mixing assistant (tracks 1–3, 9, 10)
- Jon Gass – mixing (tracks 4, 8)
- Şerban Ghenea – engineer (track 7)
- John Hayes – engineer (track 7)
- Jagged Edge – background vocals (track 3)
- Lil' Kim – vocals (track 2)
- Trey Lorenz – background vocals (tracks 6, 9)
- Manny Marroquin – engineer (tracks 4, 8)
- George Meyers – engineer (track 7)
- Monica – lead and background vocals (track 4)
- Greg Phillinganes – piano (tracks 4, 8)
- Herb Powers – mastering
- L.A. Reid – executive producer
- Ivy Skoff – production coordination (track 8)
- Manuel Seal – co-producer (tracks 2, 3, 5, 6, 9), instruments (tracks 1, 10), background vocals (tracks 6, 9)
- Shanice – background vocals (track 8)
- LaKimbra Sneed – design
- Phil Tan – engineer and mixing (tracks 1–3, 5, 6, 9, 10)
- Usher – vocals (all tracks)
- Randy Walker – MIDI programming (tracks 4, 8)
- D.L. Warfield – art direction
- Rob Williams – engineer (track 2)
- Sprague "Doogie" Williams – producer (track 7)

== Charts ==
=== Weekly charts ===
Weekly chart performance for My Way
Chart (1997–1998)	Peak position
Australian Albums (ARIA)	37
Canadian Albums (Billboard)	13
Canada R&B Albums (SoundScan)	1
Dutch Albums (Album Top 100)	30
European Top 100 Albums (Music & Media)	40
French Albums (SNEP)	38
German Albums (Offizielle Top 100)	41
New Zealand Albums (RMNZ)	21
Scottish Albums (Official Charts)	91
Swedish Albums (Sverigetopplistan)	56
Swiss Albums (Schweizer Hitparade)	20
UK Albums (Official Charts)	16
UK R&B Albums (Official Charts)	3
US Billboard 200	4
US Top R&B/Hip-Hop Albums (Billboard)	1

=== Year-end charts ===
1997 year-end chart performance for My Way
Chart (1997)	Position
Canadian Albums (SoundScan)	60
Canadian R&B Albums (SoundScan)	10
US Billboard 200	164
US Top R&B/Hip-Hop Albums (Billboard)	63

1998 year-end chart performance for My Way
Chart (1998)	Position
Canadian Albums (SoundScan)	67
Canadian R&B Albums (SoundScan)	9
Dutch Albums (Album Top 100)	88
US Billboard 200	11
US Top R&B/Hip-Hop Albums (Billboard)	6

=== Decade-end charts ===
Decade-end chart performance for My Way
Chart (1990–1999)	Position
US Billboard 200	91

== Certifications ==
Sales and certifications for My Way
Region	Certification	Certified units/sales
Australia (ARIA)	Gold	35,000^{‡}
Canada (Music Canada)	2× Platinum	200,000^{^}
Netherlands (NVPI)	Gold	50,000^{^}
United Kingdom (BPI)	Gold	100,000^{^}
United States (RIAA)	7× Platinum	7,000,000^{‡}
^{^} Shipments figures based on certification alone.^{‡} Sales+streaming figures based on certification alone.

== Release history ==
Release history for My Way
Region	Date	Format(s)	Label(s)	Ref.
United States	September 16, 1997	CD; cassette; vinyl	LaFace; Arista	
Various	September 16, 2022	Streaming; digital download; vinyl	LaFace; Arista	

== See also ==
- List of number-one R&B albums in the United States

== Bibliography ==
- Harris, Keith; et al. (November 2, 2004). Brackett, Nathan; Hoard, Christian (eds.). The New Rolling Stone Album Guide (4th ed.). Simon & Schuster. ISBN 0-7432-0169-8.
