= Indo Smoke =

Single by Mista Grimm

from the album Music from the Motion Picture Poetic Justice
- Released: June 8, 1993
- Recorded: 1993
- Studio: Echo Sounds (Los Angeles, CA)
- Genre: Hip hop
- Length: 4:45
- Label: Epic
- Songwriters: Rojai Trawick; Warren Griffin III
- Producer: Warren G

Mista Grimm singles chronology
"Indo Smoke" (1993)	"Situation: Grimm" (1994)

Warren G singles chronology
"Indo Smoke" (1993)	"Regulate" (1994)

Nate Dogg singles chronology
"Indo Smoke" (1993)	"Regulate" (1994)

Music video
- "Indo Smoke" on YouTube

"Indo Smoke" is a song and a debut single by American rapper Mista Grimm. It was released on June 8, 1993 through Epic Soundtrax as the second single from the 1993 Music from the Motion Picture Poetic Justice soundtrack. Production was handled by Warren G, who also provided uncredited vocal appearances together with Nate Dogg. The song peaked at numbers 50 and 56 on the US Cash Box Top 100 and Billboard Hot 100 charts. It also made number 63 on the Billboard Hot R&B/Hip-Hop Songs chart, marking the only significant chart appearance during Mista Grimm's brief career. The accompanying music video features cameo appearances by Lil' C-Style, Big C-Style, Dr. Dre, Kurupt, Daz Dillinger, Snoop Doggy Dogg and 2Pac.

== Track listing ==
No.	Title	Length
1.	"Indo Smoke" (Radio Edit)
2.	"Indo Smoke" (LP Version)
3.	"Indo Smoke" (Instrumental)

== Charts ==
Chart (1993)	Peak position
US Billboard Hot 100	56
US Dance Singles Sales (Billboard)	7
US Hot R&B/Hip-Hop Songs (Billboard)	63
US Hot Rap Songs (Billboard)	12
US Rhythmic Airplay (Billboard)	40
US Cash Box Top 100	50
