= Can U Get wit It =

1994 single by Usher

Single by Usher

from the album Usher
- Released: July 1, 1994
- Genre: R&B
- Length: 4:56 (album version); 4:15 (radio edit)
- Label: LaFace, Arista
- Songwriter(s): DeVante Swing
- Producer(s): DeVante Swing

Usher singles chronology
"Call Me a Mack" (1993)	"Can U Get wit It" (1994)	"Think of You" (1994)

Music video
- "Can U Get wit It" on YouTube

"Can U Get wit It" is the first single from the American recording artist Usher's first album Usher (1994). Written and produced by DeVante Swing of Jodeci, the single peaked at number 59 on the US Billboard Hot 100 and number 87 on the UK Singles Chart.

== Track listings ==
US vinyl, 12-inch

1. "Can U Get wit It" (extended edit) – 6:58
2. "Can U Get wit It" (album version) – 4:56
3. "Can U Get wit It" (instrumental – album version) – 4:58
4. "Can U Get wit It" (TV track) – 5:00

== Charts ==
=== Weekly charts ===
Chart (1994)	Peak position
UK Singles (OCC)	87
UK Dance (OCC)	39
UK Hip Hop/R&B (OCC)	21
US Billboard Hot 100	59
US Hot R&B/Hip-Hop Songs (Billboard)	13

=== Year-end charts ===
Chart (1994)	Position
US Hot R&B/Hip-Hop Songs (Billboard)	72

== Release history ==
Region	Date	Format(s)	Label(s)	Ref.
United States	July 1, 1994	12-inch vinyl; CD; cassette	LaFace	
United Kingdom	October 24, 1994	12-inch vinyl; CD; cassette	LaFace; Arista	
