= The Many Ways =

Single by Usher

from the album Usher
- Released: January 26, 1995
- Length: 5:43 (album version); 4:34 (radio edit)
- Label: LaFace; Arista
- Songwriter(s): Dave Hall; Albert Brown
- Producer(s): Dave "Jam" Hall

Usher singles chronology
"Think of You" (1994)	"The Many Ways" (1995)	"You Make Me Wanna..." (1997)

"The Many Ways" is a song by American singer Usher. It was written and produced by Dave Hall and Al B. Sure! for his self-titled debut album (1994), while production was helmed by Hall. Released by LaFace Records as the album's third and final, it underperformed on the Billboard charts, peaking at number 42 on the US Hot R&B/Hip-Hop Singles & Tracks chart, while missing the Billboard Hot 100 altogether.

== Music video ==
A music video for "The Many Ways" was directed by Hype Williams.

== Track listing ==
All tracks written by Dave Hall and Al B. Sure!; produced by Hall, co-produced by Sure.

US CD single
No.	Title	Length
1.	"The Many Ways" (album version)	5:43
2.	"The Many Ways" (radio edit)	4:34
3.	"The Many Ways" (album instrumental)	5:43

== Credits and personnel ==
Credits lifted from the liner notes of Usher.

- Sean "Puffy" Combs – executive producer
- Dave Hall – producer, writer
- Usher Raymond – vocals
- L.A. Reid – executive producer
- Al B. Sure! – background vocals, co-producer, writer

== Charts ==
Weekly chart performance for "The Many Ways"
Chart (1995)	Peak position
US Bubbling Under Hot 100 Singles (Billboard)	9
US Hot R&B/Hip-Hop Songs (Billboard)	42
