= Usher (album) =

Studio album by Usher
- Released: August 30, 1994
- Recorded: 1993–1994
- Genre: R&B
- Length: 63:13
- Labels: LaFace; Arista
- Producers: Al B. Sure!; Sean "Puff Daddy" Combs; Eddie F; Kiyamma Griffin; Dave Hall; Brian Alexander Morgan; Darryl Pearson; Alexander Richbourg; DeVante Swing; Chucky Thompson

Usher chronology
Usher (1994)	My Way (1997)

Singles from Usher
- 1. "Can U Get wit It" Released: July 1, 1994; 2. "Think of You" Released: November 10, 1994; 3. "The Many Ways" Released: January 26, 1995

Usher is the debut studio album by American singer Usher. It was released on August 30, 1994, by LaFace Records and Arista Records. Executive producer Sean "Puffy" Combs largely set the tone for the album, handling most of the production alongside his Bad Boy affiliates, including Faith Evans, Herb Middleton, Alexander Richbourg, and Chucky Thompson, while additional production was provided by Darryl Pearson, DeVante Swing, Brian Alexander Morgan and Al B. Sure!, among others.

The album received mixed reviews, earning praise for its standout tracks and seamless blend of R&B and hip-hop, while drawing criticism for its explicit lyrics, heavy production, and youthful delivery. Usher debuted at number 187 on the US Billboard 200 and later peaked at 167, also reaching number four on the Heatseekers Albums chart, ultimately selling over 500,000 copies as his subsequent success renewed interest. Of its three singles, the second, "Think of You," became the album's only top-ten R&B hit.

== Background ==
At age 12, Usher's family moved from Chattanooga, Tennessee to Atlanta, Georgia where he joined the R&B boy group NuBeginning. The group recorded ten songs in 1991, which were later released on their self-titled album in 1993. Initially distributed regionally and through mail order, the project ultimately became the group's only release. Believing he was better suited as a solo artist, his mother, Jonetta Patton, removed him from the group at 13, later calling it "a bad experience." The same year, Usher met A.J. Alexander, then a bodyguard for Bobby Brown, who began promoting him at local shows.

After performing on Star Search, Bryant Reid secured Usher an audition with his brother L.A. of LaFace Records, who signed him on the spot following his rendition of "End of the Road" by Boyz II Men. His first solo song, "Call Me a Mack", was recorded for the soundtrack album to the 1993 drama-romance film Poetic Justice. While preparing his debut album, Usher temporarily lost his voice due to puberty, leading Reid to consider dropping him. After persuading the label to keep him, he was sent to New York City in 1994 to live with Sean "Puffy" Combs to "attend" what Reid called "Puffy Flavor Camp," although Patton largely disapproved of her son hanging around Combs and the rest of the Bad Boy roster of artists.

== Promotion ==
LaFace released three singles in support of the album. "Can U Get wit It," written and produced by DeVante Swing of Jodeci was issued as the album's lead single in July 1994. It peaked at number 13 on the US Hot R&B/Hip-Hop Songs chart and number 21 on the UK Hip Hop and R&B Singles Chart, but failed to crack the upper half of the US Billboard Hot 100. Second single "Think of You," co-written by singer Faith Evans and produced by Combs and Chucky Thompson, became Usher's first top ten hit in the United States, reaching number eight on the Hot R&B/Hip-Hop Songs chart. "The Many Ways", penned and produced by Dave Hall and Al B. Sure!, was released as the album's third and final single in January 1995, but reached number 42 on the US Hot R&B/Hip-Hop Songs chart only.

== Critical reception ==
Professional ratings
Review scores
Source	Rating
AllMusic	3/5 stars
Entertainment Weekly	C−

Usher received mixed reviews from music critics, some of whom expressed concern that its lyrics were unusually explicit for a 14-year-old performer. Billy Johnson Jr. of Yahoo! Music praised the album as "an enjoyable ride," noting that Usher "delivered several standout tracks" on his debut. Similarly, The New York Amsterdam News called the album a "masterful blend of soul-stirring R&B complemented by a hip hop sensibility." Less impressed, Anderson Jones of Entertainment Weekly described the songs on Usher as "sophomoric" and "remarkably dull," concluding that "what really bogs [Usher] down is an unspectacular delivery. Unlike Tevin, Aaliyah, or even the young Michael Jackson, [he] sounds exactly like the 15-year-old he is." Likewise, Ebony characterized the album as "heavily produced." AllMusic gave the album three out of five stars, reflecting the overall mixed critical reception.

== Commercial performance ==
Usher debuted at number 187 on the US Billboard 200 in the week of September 17, 1994. Spending twelve weeks on the chart, it peaked at number 167 in the week of October 29, 1994. The album also climbed to number 25 on Billboard's Top R&B/Hip-Hop Albums and number four on the Heatseekers Albums. Although its initial performance was modest, domestic sales eventually surpassed 500,000 copies, largely driven by renewed interest following his more commercially successful later releases. In retrospect, Usher expressed dissatisfaction with the album, suggesting it did not reflect his authentic artistic identity. He later stated: You have got to be true to who you are. You can't go out as a "fad" in the industry; you have to be true to who you are, and I figure that's the reason why, maybe, I didn't have as much success with the first album. That wasn't me. That’s something Puffy wanted me to do, and it was a fad."

== Track listing ==
Usher track listing
No.	Title	Lyrics	Music	Producer(s)	Length
1.	"I'll Make It Right"	Faith Evans; Darren Benbow; Kiyamma Griffin; Isaiah Lee; Laquentis Saxon	Alexander Richbourg	Sean "Puffy" Combs; Richbourg	4:50
2.	"Interlude 1"	Usher Raymond; Evans	Chucky Thompson	Thompson	0:40
3.	"Can U Get wit It"	DeVante Swing	Swing	Swing	4:56
4.	"Think of You"	Evans; Donell Jones; Raymond	Thompson	Combs; Thompson	3:48
5.	"Crazy"	Brian Alexander Morgan	Morgan	Morgan; Herb Middleton^{[a]}; Combs^{[a]}	5:14
6.	"Slow Love"	Al B. Sure!; Isaiah Lee	Sure; Lee	Sure; Thompson^{[a]}; Combs^{[a]}; Lee^{[b]}; Griffin^{[b]}	4:57
7.	"The Many Ways"	Sure; Dave Hall	Hall	Hall; Sure^{[b]}	5:43
8.	"I'll Show You Love"	Evans; Joe Howell; Mark South	Richbourg; Charles Bobbit; James Brown; Fred Wesley	Combs; Richbourg	4:43
9.	"Interlude 2 (Can't Stop)"	Evans; Raymond	Thompson	Combs; Thompson	2:42
10.	"Love Was Here"	Sure; Griffin	Sure; Griffin	Sure; Griffin	5:37
11.	"Whispers"	Darryl Pearson; Swing	Pearson; Swing	Pearson; Swing	5:15
12.	"You Took My Heart"	Ward Corbett; Jones; Raymond	Edward "Eddie F" Ferrell; Kenneth "Kenny Love" Tonge	Eddie F	5:10
13.	"Smile Again"	Evans; Dave Hollister; Middleton	Middleton	Combs; Middleton	4:38
14.	"Final Goodbye"	Gordon Chambers; Corbett; Hall	Hall	Hall	5:00
Total length:					63:13

Notes

- ^{^[a]} denotes additional producer(s)
- ^{^[b]} denotes co-producer(s)

Sample credits

- "I'll Make It Right" contains a sample from "Top Billin'" (1987) by Audio Two.
- "Slow Love" contains a sample from "The Show" (1985) by Doug E. Fresh.
- "I'll Show You Love" contains a sample from "Blind Man Can See It" (1973) by James Brown.
- "Final Goodbye" contains a sample from "Nobody Beats the Biz" (1988) by Biz Markie.

== Personnel ==
- Herb Middleton – keyboards
- Alexander Richbourg – drums, production
- Daniel Beroff – assistant engineering
- Al B, Sure! – engineering, production
- Charles "Prince Charles" Alexander – engineering, mixing
- Bob Brockman – engineering, mixing
- Larry Funk – engineering
- Gerhard Joost – engineering
- Tony Maserati – engineering
- Brian Alexander Morgan – engineering, multi-instruments, production
- Nasheim Myrick – engineering
- Rob Paustian – engineering, mixing
- Sean "Puffy" Combs – executive production, mixing, production
- L,A, Reid – executive production
- Darryl Pearson – guitar, multi-instruments, production, background vocals
- Herb Middleton – keyboards
- David Dachinger – mixing
- DeVante Swing – mixing, multi-instruments, production
- John Shrive – mixing
- Tim Mosley – multi-instruments
- Michael Benabib – photography
- Ward Corbett – production, songwriting
- Edward "Eddie F" Ferrell – production
- Kiyamma Griffin – production
- Dave Hall – production
- Isaiah Lee – production
- Usher – vocals, background vocals
- Darren Benbow – background vocals
- Mary Brown – background vocals
- Faith Evans – background vocals
- Dave Hollister – background vocals
- Crystal Johnson – background vocals
- Laquentis Saxon – background vocals
- Levar "Lil' Tone" Wilson – background vocals

== Charts ==
=== Weekly charts ===
Weekly chart performance for Usher
Chart (1994)	Peak position
US Billboard 200	167
US Heatseekers Albums (Billboard)	4
US Top R&B/Hip-Hop Albums (Billboard)	25

=== Year-end charts ===
Year-end chart performance for Usher
Chart (1995)	Position
US Top R&B/Hip-Hop Albums (Billboard)	89
