= Go Missin' =

- Single cover

Single by Usher
- Released: February 14, 2013; February 22, 2013 (Italy - Mainstream radio)
- Genre: Electronic, R&B
- Length: 3:02
- Label: RCA
- Songwriters: Derek Allen, Eric Bellinger, Nieman Johnson, Thomas Pentz, Usher Raymond, Ariel Rechtshaid
- Producer: Diplo

"Go Missin'" is a song recorded by American singer-songwriter Usher. It was produced by Diplo and was released on Valentine's Day 2013 through SoundCloud as a free download. The year before, Usher released "Climax" on Valentine's Day, the lead single from his seventh studio album, Looking 4 Myself (2012). Prior to its release, the singer tweeted that he had a "special delivery from the cloud" for his fans, who responded positively to the release of "Climax" on Valentine's Day the preceding year.

"Go Missin'" contains similar characteristics to "Climax"; it is a quiet storm-style mid-tempo R&B track, and incorporates heavy bass and synthesizers. Usher utilizes his falsetto range throughout, with Billboard writing that the song's lyrics follow Usher attempting to "convince a stranded woman at a club to come home with him". The song received positive reviews from music critics, who praised Diplo's production and Usher's vocals.

== Background and release ==
On February 14, 2013, Valentine's Day, Usher announced through his Twitter and Facebook the release of a new single. He wrote through Twitter "You loved what I gave you last Valentine's #Climax So here is 'Special delivery from the cloud'Happy [sic] Valentine's Day!". "Go Missin'" was released on the day of its announcement through SoundCloud as a free download. The song was produced by Diplo, who previously collaborated with Usher on the track "Climax", which was released as the lead single from the latter's seventh studio album, Looking 4 Myself (2012). "Go Missin'" was later released to Italian radio on February 22, 2013.

== Composition and lyrics ==
"Go Missin'"
The chorus of "Go Missin'", making heavy use of bass and synthesizers.

"Go Missin'" has a running duration of three minutes and two seconds. It contains similar characteristics to "Climax", in that it is a quiet storm-style R&B track, complemented by drum machine. It is built upon synthesizers, while incorporating bass. Usher utilizes his falsetto range throughout the song, shifting in arrangements. Billboard wrote that the song's lyrics follow Usher attempting to "convince a stranded woman at a club to come home with him". The Huffington Post's Kia Makarechi described "Go Missin'" as a "standard track", and wrote that its lyrics contain "serial killer-esque" undertones in the line: Conscience telling you you shouldn't go, don't listen / I'mma take care of you for sure / Follow me right out that back door / Go missin.

== Critical response ==
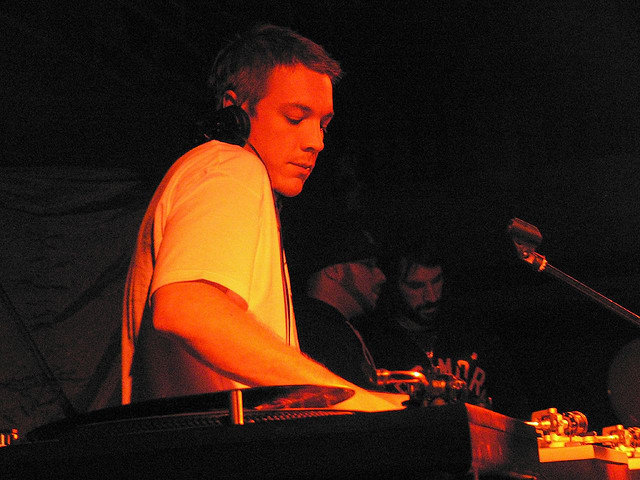
Diplo produced the song.

August Brown of Los Angeles Times commended the song's production and Usher's vocals. Brown described the track as to be "full of roiling snares and boomy bass kicks" while saying that Usher's vocals are "so pristine" that they walk a line between "digital witch-magic and the hair-raising choral work of Ligeti." About.com's Mark Edward Nero described the collaboration as "innovative", and thought that the track contained a "cinematic quality with delicate vocals laid over a moody, semi-futuristic electronic beat". Billboard's David Greenwald compared "Go Missin'" to the work of Canadian singer The Weeknd, while describing Usher's vocals as "seductive".

Marc Hogan of Spin wrote that despite the song not being as "immediately jaw-dropping" compared to "Climax", it still contains the same "Radiohead quiet storm style" as the latter song, with Usher utilizing his "hair-raising falsetto". Forrest Wickman of Slate magazine interpreted the song as different in terms of music and lyrics to the latter song. Wickman praised Usher's vocals, describing them as "calculated" to make you feel "uneasy, swirling around in minor harmonies". Rolling Stone's Jon Dolan gave the song three out of five stars, writing that "Go Missin'" is not as "subtle" as "Climax", though he praised its implementation of synthesizers, saying that it gives the song a "nervous, predatory throb".

== Chart performance ==
Chart (2015)	Peak position
Russia (Airplay)	377
