= Mista Grimm =

American rapper

- Born: Rojai Trawick
- Origin: West Covina, California
- Genre: Hip hop
- Occupation: Rapper
- Years active: 1993–2001
- Label: Epic/550

Rojai Trawick, better known as Mista Grimm, is a rapper formerly signed to Epic Records' sub-label, 550 Music. Grimm's first release was the 1993 single "Indo Smoke" featuring Warren G and Nate Dogg from the Poetic Justice soundtrack. The following year Grimm released a single entitled "Situation: Grimm" that appeared on the Higher Learning soundtrack. Mista Grimm completed his debut album Things are Looking Grimm that was originally set to be released during the summer of 1995; however, after the album's lead single "Steady Dippen" failed to make an impact, the album was shelved. Little has been heard of Mista Grimm subsequently aside from a song called "Grow Room" on DJ Pooh's 1997 album Bad Newz Travels Fast, appearances on T-Bone's albums Tha Hoodlum's Testimony (1995) andGospelAlphaMegaFunkyBoogieDiscoMusic (2002), and an appearance on Warren G's 2001 album The Return of the Regulator.

== Discography ==
=== Unreleased albums ===
- Things Are Looking Grimm (1995)

=== Singles ===
| Title | Release | Peak chart positions | | | Album |
| Title | Release | US | US R&B | US Rap | Album |
|---|---|---|---|---|---|
| "Indo Smoke" featuring Warren G & Nate Dogg | 1993 | 56 | 63 | 12 | Poetic Justice |
| "Situation: Grimm" featuring Val Young | 1994 | — | 97 | — | Higher Learning |
| "Steady Dippen" | 1995 | — | — | — | Things Are Looking Grimm |
