= Rock Wit'cha =

Single by Bobby Brown

from the album Don't Be Cruel
- Released: August 15, 1989
- Recorded: 1987 (album version); 1989 (remix version)
- Genre: R&B
- Length: 4:47 (album version); 5:04 (remix version)
- Label: MCA
- Songwriters: L.A. Reid; Babyface; Daryl Simmons
- Producers: L.A. Reid; Babyface

Bobby Brown singles chronology
"On Our Own" (1989)	"Rock Wit'cha" (1989)	"She Ain't Worth It" (1990)

"Rock Wit'cha" is the fifth and final single released by Bobby Brown from the album Don't Be Cruel. An R&B ballad, there are two versions of the song; the album version from Don't Be Cruel and the remix version from Dance!...Ya Know It!. It peaked at number seven on the Billboard Hot 100 in late 1989.

The music video was filmed in Boston.

== Personnel ==
- Bobby Brown: lead vocals
- L.A. Reid: drums, percussion
- Babyface: keyboards, Moog bass, background vocals
- Donald Parks: Fairlight synth programming
- After 7: background vocals

== Charts ==
Chart (1989–1990)	Peak position
Australia (ARIA)	57
Canada Dance/Urban (RPM)	16
Canada Top Singles (RPM)	14
Ireland (IRMA)	13
New Zealand (Recorded Music NZ)	17
UK Singles (Official Charts)	33
US Billboard Hot 100	7
US Adult Contemporary (Billboard)	28
US Dance Singles Sales (Billboard)	8
US Hot R&B/Hip-Hop Songs (Billboard)	3

=== Year-end charts ===
Chart (1989)	Position
United States (Billboard)	95

== Certifications ==
Region	Certification	Certified units/sales
United States (RIAA)	Gold	500,000^{^}
^{^} Shipments figures based on certification alone.
