= Call Me a Mack =

Single by Usher

from the album Poetic Justice: Music from the Motion Picture
- Released: August 16, 1993
- Recorded: January 22, 1993
- Genre: New jack swing
- Length: 4:03 (album version)
- Label: Epic; LaFace
- Songwriters: Usher Raymond; Tim Thomas; Teddy Bishop
- Producers: Tim Thomas; Teddy Bishop

Usher singles chronology
"Call Me a Mack" (1993)	"Can U Get wit It" (1994)

Music video
- "Call Me a Mack" on YouTube

"Call Me a Mack" is the debut single released by R&B singer Usher. It was written by Usher, Tim Thomas and Teddy Bishop and recorded for the soundtrack album of the 1993 romantic drama film Poetic Justice. Produced by Thomas and Bishop under their production moniker Tim & Ted, "Call Me a Mack" was released separately in 1993 for Epic Records. It peaked at number 56 on Billboard's US Hot R&B/Hip-Hop Songs chart.

== Music video ==
A music video for "Call Me a Mack" was directed by F. Gary Gray.

== Track listing ==
All tracks written by Usher Raymond, Tim Thomas, and Teddy Bishop.

CD single
No.	Title	Producer(s)	Length
1.	"Call Me a Mack" (album version)	Thomas; Bishop	4:03
2.	"Call Me a Mack" (Crazycool mix)	Thomas; Bishop; Dave Hall^{[a]}	5:32
3.	"U Got It Bad" (Mack mix)	Thomas; Bishop; Chad Elliott^{[a]}; Vincent Herbert^{[a]}; Ben Garrison^{[b]}	4:38
4.	"U Got It Bad" (extramental)	Thomas; Bishop	4:02

Notes

- ^{^[a]} denotes remix producer(s)
- ^{^[b]} denotes co-producer(s)

== Credits and personnel ==
Credits lifted from the liner notes of Poetic Justice.

- Teddy Bishop – producer, writer
- Blake Eiseman – engineer
- Jon Frye – engineer
- Chris Gehringer – mastering engineer
- Ron Horvath – engineer
- Usher Raymond – vocals, writer
- Tim Thomas – producer, writer
- Dave Way – mixing engineer
- Jim Zumpano – engineer

== Charts ==
Weekly chart performance for "Call Me a Mack"
Chart (1993)	Peak position
US Hot R&B/Hip-Hop Songs (Billboard)	56
