= Every Little Step =

1989 single by Bobby Brown

Single by Bobby Brown

from the album Don't Be Cruel
- Released: 1989
- Genre: R&B; new jack swing; pop
- Length: 3:57
- Label: MCA
- Songwriters: Kenneth Edmonds; Antonio Reid
- Producers: Babyface; L.A. Reid

Bobby Brown singles chronology
"Roni" (1988)	"Every Little Step" (1989)	"On Our Own" (1989)

Music video
- "Every Little Step" on YouTube

"Every Little Step" is a song by American singer Bobby Brown, written by L.A. Reid and Kenneth "Babyface" Edmonds and released by MCA Records. Released as the fourth single on his second album Don't Be Cruel it reached number three on the US Billboard Hot 100, number two on the Cash Box Top 100 chart, number one on the Billboard Hot Black Singles chart, and number six on the UK Singles Chart. The song also appears on Brown's remix album Dance!...Ya Know It!. The single garnered Brown's first career Grammy Award for Best Male R&B Vocal Performance at the 32nd Grammy Awards in 1990.

== Composition and production ==
Around the time Don't Be Cruel was in production, Reid was dating singer Pebbles, who later became his wife. Inspired by his relationship with his girlfriend at the time, he wrote and co-produced the song with Edmonds, intending to give it to the group Midnight Star. Bobby Brown, however, heard a demo of the song and liked it instantly, which led to its inclusion on Don't Be Cruel.

There were two versions of the song: There was the original album/single version, which was the version used in the video, and there was an alternate version with different vocal takes and a rap section. The latter version was later included on the deluxe edition of Don't Be Cruel.

Brown popularized the Roger Rabbit dance (aka the "backwards" running man), as performed in the music video for the song, along with the Gumby-style hi-top fade.

In 1995, "Every Little Step" was remixed by British DJ/producer C.J. Mackintosh and was included on Brown's remix album, Two Can Play That Game (1995). This version of the song was released as a single in 1996, reaching number 25 in the UK Singles Chart.

In 2013, former New Edition manager Steven Machat claimed additional vocals on the song were allegedly done by Brown's friend, and fellow New Edition member Ralph Tresvant. Machat alleges that Tresvant was brought in to sing some of Brown's vocals, as he claims Brown had been strung out on drugs. Machat's story contradicts what happened with Brown as far back as 1989, where he was interviewed by Rolling Stone during the filming of the video for "On Our Own". Brown said he left New Edition primarily because of Machat and his business partners, Bill Dern and Rick Smith, whom he named as the managers who ripped him off and started the rumor of him being heavily addicted to drugs at the time. Brown said,

People at MCA thought we was on drugs. That wasn't us. We were a bunch of brats, but we wasn't into drugs, we wasn't into liquor. We was into girls.

== Personnel ==
- Bobby Brown: lead and backing vocals
- L.A. Reid: remixing, drum programming, percussion
- Donald K. Parks: Fairlight programming
- Kayo: Pro-One synth bass, backing vocals
- Daryl Simmons, Karyn White, Kenneth "Babyface" Edmonds: backing vocals

== Charts ==
=== Weekly charts ===
Chart (1989)	Peak position
Australia (ARIA)	8
Belgium (Ultratop 50 Flanders)	32
Canada Top Singles (RPM)	12
Canada Dance/Urban (RPM)	1
Europe (Eurochart Hot 100)	19
Ireland (IRMA)	10
Netherlands (Dutch Top 40)	28
Netherlands (Single Top 100)	30
New Zealand (Recorded Music NZ)	5
UK Singles (Official Charts)	6
US Billboard Hot 100	3
US 12-inch Singles Sales (Billboard)	5
US Dance Club Play (Billboard)	17
US Hot Black Singles (Billboard)	1
US Cash Box Top 100	2

=== Year-end charts ===
Chart (1989)	Position
Australia (ARIA)	88
Canada Dance/Urban (RPM)	7
New Zealand (RIANZ)	21
US Billboard Hot 100	48
US 12-inch Singles Sales (Billboard)	46
US Hot Black Singles (Billboard)	30
US Cash Box Top 100	25

== Certifications ==
Region	Certification	Certified units/sales
Australia (ARIA)	Gold	35,000^{^}
New Zealand (RMNZ)	Platinum	30,000^{‡}
United Kingdom (BPI)	Silver	200,000^{‡}
United States (RIAA)	Gold	500,000^{^}
^{^} Shipments figures based on certification alone.^{‡} Sales+streaming figures based on certification alone.
