= Collage (American band) =

American band

- Origin: United States
- Genres: Boogie, dance, soul, funk, synthpop
- Years active: 1980–1986
- Labels: SOLAR; MCA Records
- Past members: Albert De Gracia; Dean Boysen; Emilio Conesa; Kirk Crumpler; Larry White; Lee Peters; Melicio Magdaluyo; Richard Aguon, Ross Wilson; Ruben Laxamana

Collage was an American R&B band, best known for their crossover song "Romeo Where's Juliet?".

== Career ==
Collage's debut album Do You Like Our Music?, released in 1981 by Solar Records, was produced by the Whispers. Their next album Get In Touch was typified by the change from disco/funk elements found in the first album to boogie-influenced urban music. Before Collage's departure from the music business they also released album entitled Shine The Light, which also features "Romeo Where's Juliet?".

The bands popularity came with the release of "Romeo Where's Juliet?", which was a moderate hit in the United Kingdom. The single reached number forty six on the British pop chart and number 49 on the US Billboard Hot Dance Club Songs chart.

Four members of the band (Larry White, Lee Peters, Richard Aguon, and Ruben Laxamana) later wrote the song "I Want You," which was featured as the lead-off track on the Whispers' 1987 hit album Just Gets Better with Time.

== Past members ==
- Albert De Gracia - Fender Rhodes, piano
- Dean Boysen - trumpet, flugelhorn
- Emilio Conesa - electric guitar, acoustic guitar
- David Agent - bass
- Kirk Crumpler - bass
- Larry White - electric guitar
- Lee Peters - background vocals, lead vocals
- Melicio Magdaluyo - saxophone, flute
- Richard Aguon - drums, percussion
- Ruben Laxamana - saxophone, vocals

== Discography ==
=== Studio albums ===
Year	Album	Record label
1981	Do You Like Our Music?	SOLAR
1983	Get in Touch	SOLAR
1985	Shine the Light	MCA

=== Singles ===
Year	Single	Chart positions		
Year	Single	US R&B	US Dance	UK
1982	"Money in Your Pocket"	—	—	—
1982	"Groovin'"	—	—	—
1983	"Get in Touch with Me"	56	—	—
1983	"Young Girls"	—	—	—
1985	"Romeo Where's Juliet?"	86	49	46
1985	"Winners and Losers"	—	—	—
"—" denotes releases that did not chart or were not released.
