= Roni (song) =

1988 single by Bobby Brown

Single by Bobby Brown

from the album Don't Be Cruel
- Released: December 27, 1988
- Studio: Silverlake (Los Angeles, California)
- Genre: R&B; pop• New Jack Swing
- Length: 5:58 (album version); 4:34 (7-inch version)
- Label: MCA
- Songwriters: Babyface; Darnell Bristol
- Producers: L.A. Reid; Babyface

Bobby Brown singles chronology
"My Prerogative" (1988)	"Roni" (1988)	"Every Little Step" (1989)

"Roni" is a song by American singer Bobby Brown, written by Kenneth "Babyface" Edmonds with additional lyrics written by the Deele member Darnell Bristol. Background vocals are provided by former New Edition bandmate, Ralph Tresvant. It was released on the MCA label as the third single from Brown's second album, Don't Be Cruel (1988). "Roni" reached number three on both the US Billboard Hot 100 and US Cash Box Top 100 charts, as well as number two on the Hot Black Singles chart.

== Charts ==
=== Weekly charts ===
Chart (1989)	Peak position
Canada Top Singles (RPM)	13
Europe (Eurochart Hot 100)	65
New Zealand (Recorded Music NZ)	21
UK Singles (Official Charts)	21
US Billboard Hot 100	3
US Dance Singles Sales (Billboard)	7
US Hot R&B/Hip-Hop Songs (Billboard)	2
US Cash Box Top 100	3

=== Year-end charts ===
Chart (1989)	Position
US Billboard Hot 100	80
US Hot Black Singles (Billboard)	26
