= Don't Be Cruel (Bobby Brown song) =

1988 single by Bobby Brown

Single by Bobby Brown

from the album Don't Be Cruel
- Released: May 16, 1988
- Studio: Silverlake (Los Angeles, California)
- Genre: R&B; new jack swing; hip hop
- Length: 6:48 (album version); 4:15 (single version)
- Label: MCA
- Songwriters: Kenneth Edmonds; Antonio Reid; Daryl Simmons
- Producers: L.A. Reid; Babyface

Bobby Brown singles chronology
"Girl Next Door" (1987)	"Don't Be Cruel" (1988)	"My Prerogative" (1988)

Music video
- "Don’t Be Cruel" on YouTube

"Don't Be Cruel" is a song by American singer Bobby Brown. Taken from his second studio album of the same name, the song was written and produced by the songwriting and production duo Kenneth "Babyface" Edmonds and Antonio "L.A." Reid, with additional writing by Daryl Simmons.

== Music Video ==
The music video was filmed in Boston on May 1988.

== Chart performance ==
"Don't Be Cruel" was Brown's second single to reach the top position of the R&B chart, where it remained for two weeks. It also reached number eight on the US Billboard Hot 100 and number seven on the US Cash Box Top 100.

== In popular culture ==
"Don’t Be Cruel" was featured in the popular video game Grand Theft Auto: San Andreas, playing on fictional new jack swing radio station CSR 103.9.

== Charts ==
=== Weekly charts ===
Chart (1988–1989)	Peak position
Australia (ARIA)	72
Belgium (Ultratop 50 Flanders)	39
Europe (Eurochart Hot 100)	40
Ireland (IRMA)	23
New Zealand (Recorded Music NZ)	18
UK Singles (OCC)	13
US Billboard Hot 100	8
US Dance Singles Sales (Billboard)	6
US Hot R&B/Hip-Hop Songs (Billboard)	1
US Cash Box Top 100	7

=== Year-end charts ===
Chart (1988)	Position
US Billboard Hot 100	79

== Certifications ==
Region	Certification	Certified units/sales
United States (RIAA)	Gold	500,000^{^}
^{^} Shipments figures based on certification alone.
