= Think of You (Usher song) =

Single by Usher

from the album Usher
- Released: November 10, 1994
- Length: 3:45 (album mix)
- Label: LaFace; Arista
- Songwriter(s): Donell Jones; Faith Evans; Usher Raymond
- Producer(s): Sean "Puffy" Combs; Chucky Thompson

Usher singles chronology
"Can U Get wit It" (1994)	"Think of You" (1994)	"The Many Ways" (1995)

Music video
- "Think Of You" on YouTube

"Think of You" is a song by American musician Usher. It was co-written by Usher alongside LaFace Records labelmate Donell Jones and Bad Boy singer Faith Evans for his self-titled debut album (1994). The song samples a groove from the instrumental track "Tidal Wave" (1975) by American jazz musician Ronnie Laws, also featuring vocals from rapper Biz Markie's "Just Rhymin' With Biz" (1987). Lyrically, "Think of You" finds the protagonist going through a breakup and dealing with conflicting feelings about his ex.

The song was released as the album's second single in November 1994 and emerged as Usher highest-charting song up to then: It became his first top ten hit on the US Billboard Hot R&B Singles chart, reaching number eight, while also peaking at number 58 on the Billboard Hot 100, and at number 70 on the UK Singles Chart. The song's accompanying music video, directed Hype Williams, features a young Taral Hicks and depicts Usher dancing and performing against an industrial backdrop.

== Background ==
"Think of You" was written by Usher along with labelmates Donell Jones and Faith Evans. Production was overseen by Chucky Thompson and Sean "Puffy" Combs. The song contains a sample from the 1975 instrumental "Tidal Wave" by American jazz musician Ronnie Laws. It further samples the vocals "yes, yes y'all [...] to the beat y'all" from rapper Biz Markie's 1987 Big Daddy Kane collaboration "Just Rhymin' With Biz." Markie is credited as a special guest on the track.

Thompson later commented on the creation of the song: "I did a record for Usher called "Think of You" and [Evans] came in and wrote, Donell Jones wrote. I actually made that record before I met Puff as well. When I sent it up there, I had no idea what was gonna happen to it. He just had writer sessions or whatever, next thing I know they pressed play and here comes "Think of You"." In 2023, Usher further remarked that "Can U Get Wit It" was "cool. But "Think of You" was "okay, I’ve got enough to hook. I got enough skin in the game to stay. They can’t get rid of me yet." You know what I’m saying?"

== Music video ==
A music video for "Think of You" was directed by Hype Williams. It features a young Taral Hicks that Usher is singing to.

== Track listing ==
All tracks written by Usher Raymond, Donell Jones, and Faith Evans.

US CD single
No.	Title	Producer(s)	Length
1.	"Think of You" (album version)	Sean "Puffy" Combs; Chucky Thompson	3:48
2.	"Think of You" (So So Def remix)	Combs; Thompson; Jermaine Dupri^{[a]}; Shannon Houchins^{[a]}	3:45
3.	"Think of You" (So So Def extended mix)	Combs; Thompson; Dupri^{[a]}; Houchins^{[a]}	5:10
4.	"Think of You" (album instrumental)	Combs; Thompson	3:48
5.	"Think of You" (Bad Boy remix)	Combs; Thompson	4:16

Notes

- ^{^[a]} denotes remix producer(s)
- ^{^[b]} denotes co-producer(s)

== Credits and personnel ==
Credits lifted from the liner notes of Usher.

- "Prince Charles" Alexander – mixing, recording
- Sean "Puffy" Combs – mixing, producer
- Faith Evans – background vocals, lyrics
- Donell Jones – lyrics
- Usher Raymond – lyrics, vocals
- Chucky Thompson – music, producer

== Charts ==
=== Weekly charts ===
Weekly chart performance for "Think of You"
Chart (1994–1995)	Peak position
UK Singles (OCC)	70
UK Dance (OCC)	33
UK Hip Hop/R&B (OCC)	10
US Billboard Hot 100	58
US Hot R&B/Hip-Hop Songs (Billboard)	8
US Dance Singles Sales (Billboard)	23

=== Year-end charts ===
Year-end chart performance for "Think of You"
Chart (1995)	Position
US Hot R&B/Hip-Hop Songs (Billboard)	36

== Release history ==
Release history for "Think of You"
Region	Date	Format(s)	Label(s)	Ref.
United States	November 10, 1994	12-inch vinyl; CD; cassette	LaFace	
United Kingdom	March 6, 1995	12-inch vinyl; CD	LaFace; Arista	
