= List of Usher live performances =

Usher live performances
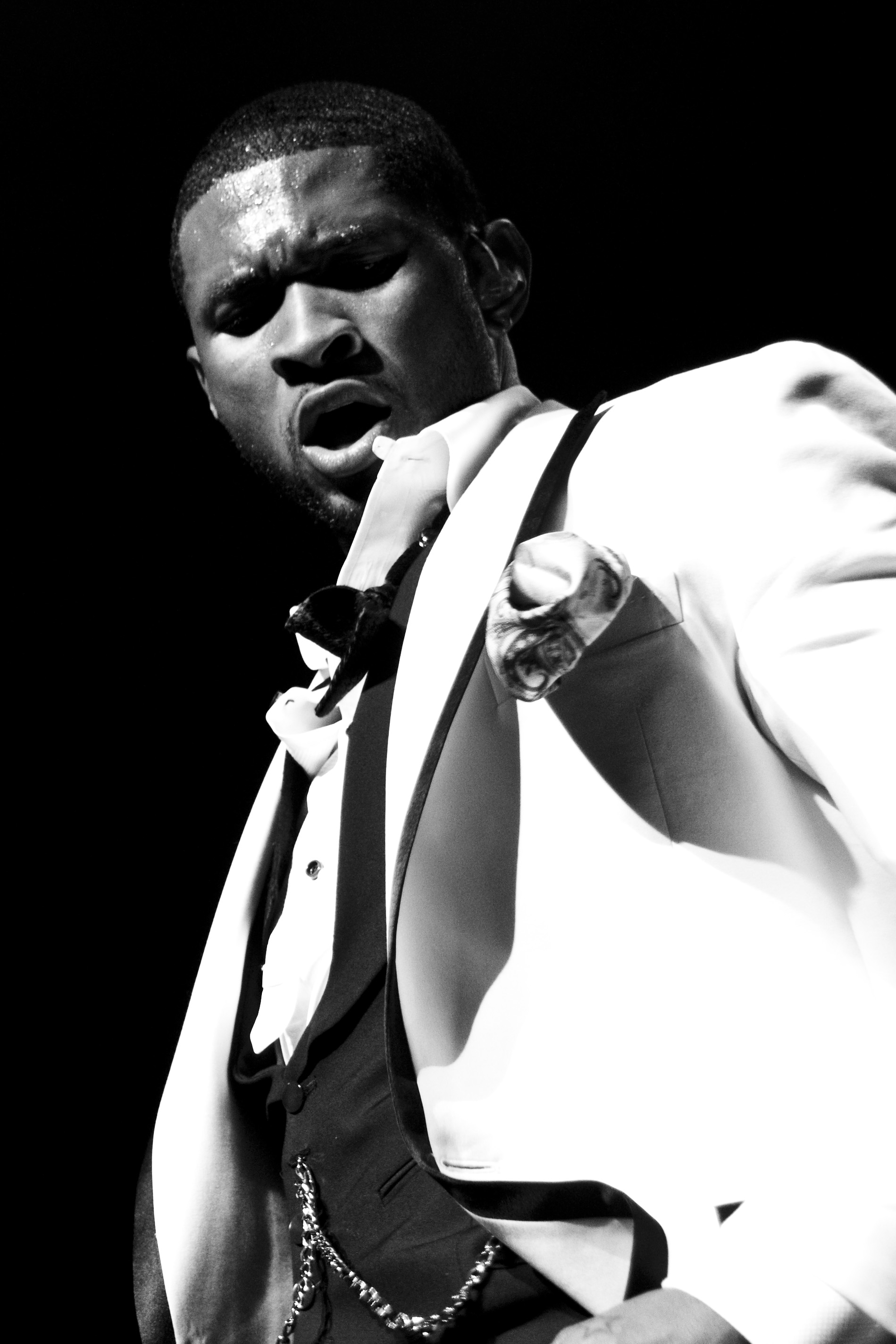
- Usher performing at the Warfield Theatre, 2008
- ↙Concert tours: 7
- ↙Concert specials and festivals: 59
- ↙Guest Act: 17
- ↙Tribute Performances: 16
- ↙Award shows performances: 44
- ↙Performances at television shows and specials: 59

American singer Usher has embarked on six concert tours, four of which have been worldwide. He first served as an opening act for Mary J. Blige, Janet Jackson, and Puff Daddy from 1997 to 1999. His headlining arena tour debut, 8701 Evolution Tour began in North America then expanded to Europe and visiting Africa, supporting his third studio album, 8701 (2001). Following the release of his fourth studio album, Confessions, Usher embarked on his next world tour The Truth Tour. For this tour Usher collaborated with MasterCard, the company gave him his own prepaid debit card with his picture on it that was sold at his concert. The card gave fans access to his website where they get discounts on concert tickets and Usher merchandise, T-shirts and key chains. In 2008, to promote his fifth studio album, Here I Stand, he began his 14 date One Night Stand Tour in the United States.

In 2012, Usher announced that he would embark on his fourth concert tour, the Euphoria Tour, to further promote Looking 4 Myself, he planned to perform in countries including France, Germany, Belgium, Norway, Finland, Sweden, Switzerland and the United Kingdom, however it was cancelled because of his commitment to the reality talent show The Voice, where he was a judge in the show's fourth season. In 2010 he took part in his third world tour; The OMG Tour, in which supported his sixth studio album, Raymond v. Raymond (2010), as well as his first extended play, Versus (2010). Grossing in the US$75 million, selling over 922,000 tickets. In 2014, Usher went on his fourth concert world tour, The UR Experience. This tour was composed of a wide array of Raymonds's discography, in addition to new songs "Good Kisser", "She Came to Give It to You", "I Don't Mind" and a medleys of previous hits.

Outside of world tours, Usher has performed an array of televised tribute performances for various artist some including Michael Jackson, Luther Vandross, Frank Sinatra, Quincy Jones, LA Reid, Janet Jackson, Whitney Houston, and Stevie Wonder. Raymond performed at the Super Bowl XLV and Super Bowl LVIII Halftime Show, Saturday Night Live, various times at awards shows such as the Grammy Awards, MTV Video Music Awards, BET Awards, American Music Awards and others as well. He has performed at events for both the first inauguration and second inauguration for President Barack Obama. Performing at the We Are One: The Obama Inaugural Celebration at the Lincoln Memorial on January 18, 2008, and "Kids' Inaugural: Our Children Our Future" event at the Washington Convention Center in Washington, D.C., on January 19, 2013.

== Tours ==
Year	Title	Duration	Number of performances
2002	8701 Evolution Tour	April 4, 2002 – July 7, 2002 (North America)	62
8701 Evolution Tour was Usher's first solo concert tour. Its set list mainly drew from his self-titled third solo album, 8701 (2001), but also included songs from his second album My Way. His North American leg featured several opening acts, including Faith Evans, Nas and Mr. Cheeks. On November 19, 2002, a live video album named Usher Live Evolution 8701 was released on November 19, 2002. ABC Family Channel premiered Usher: Evolution 8701 Live in concert on March 16, 2003.^{[2]} The tour consisted of 40 shows in North America, 20 in Europe and 2 in Africa.
2004-05	Truth Tour	August 5, 2004 –October 7, 2004 (North America)	27
The Truth Tour was the second concert tour by American recording artist Usher. Visiting North America and Europe, the tour accompanies his fourth studio album, Confessions. His North American leg featured opening acts JoJo, Christina Milian and Kanye West. "The Truth Tour" commenced on August 5, 2004, in Hampton, Virginia and concluded on October 7, 2004, in New York.^{[17]} It was ranked as one of the highest-grossing tours of 2004, grossing $29.1 million.^{[19]} Showtime broadcast the show during a special titled One Night, One Star: Usher Live: Live in Puerto Rico at José Miguel Agrelot Coliseum. During the concert special he brought out special guest Lil Jon, Ludacris, Daddy Yankee, Fat Joe, and Beyoncé to perform a dance routine to "Bad Girl" choreographed by Frank Gatson. As of September 16, 2005 DVD The Truth Tour: Behind The Tour, has been certified 7× Platinum by RIAA.
2008	One Night Stand: Ladies Only Tour	November 2, 2008 – November 25, 2008 (North America)	14
Usher toured fourteen cities in North America, coining the trip One Night Stand: Ladies Only Tour. Mainly targeting women, the tour commenced on November 2, 2008, and concluded on November 25, 2008. The tour's female-focused concept was inspired by other male recording artists who "did things special like this for their female fans", such as Teddy Pendergrass, Marvin Gaye and Prince. Enjoying the challenge of a female-only tour, Usher said, "There [are] only a few artists that can pull that off, I feel like I've had such a connection with my audience. This album, I felt like, was definitely the type of one that was more intimate. So what better way to get up close and personal than to make it all women?".
2010-11	OMG Tour	Nov 10, 2010 – June 1, 2011, (North America & Europe)	92
OMG Tour was the third concert tour by American recording artist Usher. Visiting North America, Asia, Europe and Australia, the tour accompanies his sixth studio album, Raymond v. Raymond (2010), as well as his first extended play, Versus (2010). It featured opening acts Miguel and Trey Songz. At the conclusion of 2011, the tour placed seventh on Billboard's annual, "Top 25 Tours", earning nearly $75 million with 73 shows. The OMG Tour: Live From London on was released on October 31, 2011. The show was filmed on February 21, 2011, at The O_{2} Arena in London, directed by Dick Carruthers.
2014–15	The UR Experience Tour	November 1, 2014 - March 26, 2015 (North America & Europe)	50
The UR Experience was the fifth concert tour by American recording artist Usher. Visiting North American and Europe. Its setlist was composed of a wide array of Raymonds's discography, in addition to new songs "Good Kisser", "She Came to Give It to You", "I Don't Mind" and a medleys of previous hits. August Alsina and DJ Cassidy supported his North American leg. For the European leg he would enlist the African-Norwegian group Nico & Vinz; introducing both to the public during their early careers.^{[2][3]} Yahoo broadcast the show on livestream his concert at Rexall Place in Edmonton, Alberta in Canada.
2018	RNB Fridays	November 9–17, 2018 (Australia)	5
Usher joined by Lil Jon, headlined RNB Fridays Live. The stadium tour started in Perth and stopped in Melbourne, Adelaide and Brisbane along the way before ending in Sydney in mid-November. Supporting acts included Salt-N-Pepa, Trey Songz, Eve, Estelle, Naughty by Nature, Ginuwine, Next, and Fatman Scoop.

== Concerts and festivals ==
Date	Event	Info
October 29, 1998	B96 Halloween Bash	Usher performed as the headliner for the concert held at Rosemont Horizon in Chicago, Illinois. Other performers included Monica, Tatyana Ali, Mya, Nicole, Sweetbox, Pras and INOJ.
July 8, 2001	Party in the Park	Usher performed at the festival held at Hyde Park in London, England. Other performers included Destiny’s Child, Bow Wow, Nelly Furtado, Craig David, Sisqo, Wyclef Jean, Shaggy and many others.
August 18, 2001	106.1 All Star Summer Jam	Usher performed at the concert held at Shoreline Amphitheatre in Mountain View, California. Other performers included Mary J Blige, Ginuwine, Musiq Soulchild, Sunshine Anderson and Erick Sermon.
September 7–10, 2001	Michael Jackson: 30th Anniversary Special	Usher performed at both concerts held at Madison Square Garden in New York City, New York. It was broadcast by ABC Other performers included Michael Jackson, The Jackson 5, Whitney Houston, Ray Charles, Luther Vandross, Britney Spears, Destiny’s Child, NSYNC, Mýa and many others.
October 21, 2001	United We Stand: What More Can I Give	Usher performed at the benefit concert held by Michael Jackson which took place at the RFK Stadium in Washington, D.C. The concert was the third major concert held in tribute to the victims of the September 11, 2001 attacks. The other two were held in New York City.
July 19, 2002	Kube 93 Summer Jam	Usher performed as co-headliner for the concert alongside Nelly and Jermaine Dupri at The Gorge Amphitheatre in George, Washington Other performers included LL Cool J, Busta Rhymes, Da Brat, Mario and others.
November 23, 2002	MTV Staying Alive Concert	Usher performed as co-headliner for the concert alongside P.Diddy at Green Point Stadium in Cape Town, South Africa. The event was held to support HIV and AIDS charities in South Africa. Other performers included local South African acts like Danny K, Mandoza, 101, Bianca Le Grange and Ready and D.
March 5, 2005	One Night, One Star: Usher Live	Showtime broadcast Usher’s concert live at the José Miguel Agrelot Coliseum in San Juan, Puerto Rico Other performers included Beyoncé, Lil Jon, Ludacris, Daddy Yankee and Fat Joe.
July 25, 2005	Hot 107.9 Birthday Bash	Usher performed at the concert as a surprise guest during Ludacris’s set at the Hi Fi Buys Amphitheater in Atlanta, Georgia . Other performers included Kanye West, T.I, Jermaine Dupri, Ying Yang Twins, Da Brat and many others
October 1, 2005	Andre Agassi’s Grandslam For Children	Usher performed at the benefit concert held at the MGM Grand Garden Arena in Las Vegas, Nevada. Other performers included Celine Dion, Mary J Blige, The Eagles, Duran Duran, Earth Wind & Fire, Glenn Frey and special appearances by Robin Williams and George Lopez.
October 9, 2005	Usher‘s Project Restart	Usher held a benefit concert as headliner to help aid survivors of Hurricane Katrina. The event was held at the Philips Arena in Atlanta, Georgia. Other performers included Alicia Keys, Chris Brown, T.I, Young Jeezy and an appearance by James Brown and others.
May 1, 2008	Radio 1's Big Weekend	Usher performed at the festival held at Mote Park in Maidstone, Kent. Other performers included Madonna, Nelly, OneRepublic, The Fratellis, The Kooks, The Hoosiers and many others.
June 14, 2008	Hot 107.9 Birthday Bash	Usher performed at the concert as a surprise guest during Young Jeezy’s set which took place at the Philips Arena in Atlanta, Georgia . Other performers included Kanye West, T.I, Ludacris, Shawty Lo, The Game, Plies and many others
September 4, 2008	NFL Kickoff Concert	Usher performed as co-headliner for the concert alongside Keith Urban and Natasha Bedingfield held at Columbus Circle in New York City, New York.
December 11, 2009	Z100’s Jingle Ball	Usher introduced and performed with Justin Bieber for the concert held at Madison Square Garden in New York City, New York. Other performers include Taylor Swift, Jordin Sparks, Adam Lambert, Jay Sean, Pitbull, John Mayer, Ke$ha and others.
May 13, 2010	Wild 94.9 Wild Jam	Usher performed as the headliner for the concert held at HP Pavilion in San Jose, California . Other performers included Ke$ha, Trey Songz, B.O.B, New Boyz, Jay Sean, Lil Jon and others.
May 15, 2010	KIIS-FM Wango Tango	Usher performed as the headliner for the concert held at Staples Center in Los Angeles, California . Other performers included Justin Bieber, Ke$ha, Ludacris, Bruno Mars, Kelly Rowland and others.
June 6, 2010	Capital FM Summertime Ball	Usher performed as co-headliner for the concert alongside Rihanna at Wembley Stadium in London, England. Other performers included Justin Bieber, Ke$ha, Jason Derulo, Cheryl Cole, JLS, Pixie Lott and many others.
June 6, 2010	Hot 97 Summer Jam	Usher performed as the headliner for the concert held at New Meadowlands Stadium in East Rutherford, New Jersey. Other performers included Drake, Nicki Minaj, Trey Songz, Ludacris, Juelz Santana, Gucci Mane, Fabolous and many others.
June 16, 2010	Activision E3	Usher performed at the concert held at the Staples Center in Los Angeles, California. He featured Will.I.Am as part of his set. Other performers included Eminem, Rihanna, David Guetta, Deadmau5, N.E.R.D and others.
July 11, 2011	Essence Music Festival	Usher performed as the headliner for the first night of the festival held at Louisiana Superdome in New Orleans, Louisiana. Other performers included Mary J. Blige, Kanye West, Fantasia, Jill Scott, Chaka Khan and many others.
September 23–24, 2011	iHeartRadio Music Festival	Usher performed with David Guetta on the second night of the two-day festival held at the MGM Grand Garden Arena in Las Vegas, Nevada. Other performers included Lady Gaga, Jennifer Lopez, Nicki Minaj, Black Eyed Peas, Jay Z, Bruno Mars, Rascal Flatts and many others.
October 15, 2011	Decade Of Difference: A Concert Celebrating 10 Years of the William J. Clinton Foundation	Usher performed at the concert held at Hollywood Bowl in Los Angeles, CA. Other performers included Lady Gaga, Stevie Wonder, Bono and The Edge, Kenny Chesney and Grace Potter with appearances being made by Ellen DeGeneres, Ashton Kutcher, Jay Z, Lindsay Lohan and others.
March 10, 2012	Hansa Festival Of Legends	Usher performed as the headliner for the festival held at Orlando Stadium in Johannesburg, South Africa The lineup included local South African and international acts.
June 4, 2012	E3 2012	Usher performed at the Microsoft press conference to promote Dance Central 3. It was held at the Los Angeles Convention Center in Los Angeles, California.
June 6, 2012	Hot 107.9 Birthday Bash	Usher performed at the concert as a surprise guest during T.I’s set at Philips Arena in Atlanta, Georgia. Other performers included Lil Wayne, Kelly Rowland, Future, Nelly, Lil Jon, Gucci Mane and others.
June 9, 2012	Capital FM Summertime Ball	Usher performed at the concert held at Wembley Stadium in London, England. Other performers included Justin Bieber, Katy Perry, Ed Sheeran, Coldplay, The Wanted, Jessie J, Pitbull, Kelly Clarkson and many others.
June 11, 2012	Unstaged	Raymond performed for American Express Unstaged or Unstaged: An Original Series from American Express, is a series of individual concert films sponsored by American Express.
September 1–30, 2012	iTunes Music Festival	Usher performed as the headliner for the first night of the festival held at The Roundhouse in London, England with Miguel serving as opening act. Other headliners included Pink, Alicia Keys, JLS, One Direction, Jessie J, Mumford and Sons and many others.
September 21–22, 2012	iHeartRadio Music Festival	Usher performed the first night of the two-day festival held at the MGM Grand Garden Arena in Las Vegas, Nevada. He featured Swedish House Mafia as special guest. Other performers included Rihanna, Green Day, Psy, Lil Wayne, Bon Jovi, Taylor Swift, Linkin Park, Mary J Blige, Pitbull and many more.
October 26, 2012	Power 99 Powerhouse	Usher performed as the headliner alongside Rick Ross for the concert held at Wells Fargo Center in Philadelphia, Pennsylvania. Other performers included Trey Songz, Big Sean, Meek Mill, Wale, 2 Chainz, French Montana, Keyshia Cole and others.
November 16, 2012	WGCI-FM Big Jam	Usher performed as the headliner alongside Rick Ross for the concert held at Allstate Arena in Chicago, Illinois. Other performers included Future, R.Kelly, Kelly Rowland, Fat Joe and Keyshia Cole .
December 8, 2012	World Parachuting Championship Closing Ceremony	Usher performed as co-headliner for the event alongside Katy Perry at the Meydan Racecourse in Dubai, United Arab Emirates
January 19, 2013	Kids' Inaugural Concert: Our Children, Our Future	Usher performed as co-headliner for the concert alongside Katy Perry in Washington, D.C., to celebrate of the second inauguration of President Barack Obama. The event was hosted by First Lady Michelle Obama and Second Lady Jill Biden, Nick Cannon served as emcee.
January 21, 2013	Inaugural Ball	Usher performed at the event celebrating the second inauguration of President Barack Obama. Other performers included Stevie Wonder, Alicia Keys, Brad Paisley, Far East Movement, The cast of Glee, John Legend, Fun and many others.
March 7, 2014	Houston Livestock Show and Rodeo	Usher performed as the headliner for the concert in celebration of Black Heritage night at Reliant Stadium in Houston, Texas.
June 25–29, July 1–6, 2014	Summerfest	Usher performed as the headliner for the last night of the festival at Marcus Amphitheater in Milwaukee, Wisconsin with Bebe Rexha as his supporting act. Other headliners include Bruno Mars, Lady Gaga, Zac Brown Band, Brad Paisley, Dave Mathews Band, Outkast and many others.
September 20–21, 2014	iHeartRadio Music Festival	Usher performed as the headliner on the first night of the two-day festival held at the MGM Grand Garden Arena in Las Vegas, Nevada. He featured Chris Brown as special guest. Other performers included Taylor Swift, Coldplay, Ariana Grande, Nicki Minaj, Alicia Keys, Meghan Trainor, Jason Derulo, Iggy Azalea, Calvin Harris, One Direction and many others.
February 6, 2015	United Way 90th Anniversary	Usher performed as co-headliner alongside Blake Shelton as part of the 90th Anniversary Celebration which took place at the AT&T Stadium in Dallas, Texas.
June 5, 2015	Mawazine	Usher performed as the headliner for the music festival that took place in Rabat, Morocco featuring many international and local music artists.
June 20, 2015	B96 Pepsi SummerBash	Usher performed as the headliner for the concert held at SeatGeek Stadium in Chicago, Illinois Other performers included Fifth Harmony, Nick Jonas, Flo Rida, Walk The Moon, Jake Miller and many others.
July 5, 2015	Essence Music Festival	Usher performed as the headliner for the festival held at Louisiana Superdome in New Orleans, Louisiana. This was his second time headlining the festival. Other performers included Missy Elliott, Erykah Badu, Common, Beenie Man, Tank and many others.
June 4, 2016	Roots Picnic	Usher performed as the headliner for the music festival backed by The Roots at Philadelphia's Penn's Landing.
June 24–26, 2016	BET Experience	Usher performed as co-headliner alongside Bryson Tiller for the first night of the concert held at Staples Center in Los Angeles, California as part of the 2016 BET Awards weekend. He featured surprise guest acts Snoop Dogg, Ice Cube and Young Thug. Others performers on the lineup included Lil Wayne, 2 Chainz, Kehlani and others.
September 17, 2016	Global Citizen Festival Canada	Usher performed as the headliner for the festival at Bell Centre in Montreal, Canada. He was backed by The Roots. Other performers included Half Moon Run, Metric, Grimes, and Charlotte Cardin.
September 24, 2016	Global Citizen Festival	Usher performed at the festival held at Central Park's Great Lawn in New York City, New York. Other performers included Demi Lovato, Rihanna, Kendrick Lamar, Major Lazer and Metallica.
September 24, 2016	iHeartRadio Music Festival	Usher performed as the headliner for the second night of the two day festival at T-Mobile Arena in Las Vegas, Nevada. This was his second time headlining the festival and his featured surprise guests were Lil Jon and Ludacris. Other performers on the lineup included U2, Drake, Britney Spears, Sam Hunt, Twenty One Pilots, Billy Idol, Florida Georgia Line, OneRepublic, Sia, Cage The Elephant, Zedd, Tears for Fears, Ariana Grande, Pitbull, and Sting.
October 2, 2016	Malaysian Grand Prix	Usher performed as the headliner for the F1 Petronas Malaysia Grand Prix After-Race Concert in Malaysia.
October 16, 2016	Kadena Air Base	Usher performed a free concert at Kadena Air Base, in Japan, for a military audience on Sunday, October 16, 2016.
October 3, 2016	F1 Grand Prix Show	Usher performed as co-headliner for the event alongside Taylor Swift in Austin, Texas. He was backed by The Roots.
October 27, 2016	Power 105.1 Powerhouse	Usher performed as the headliner for the concert held at Barclays Center in Brooklyn, New York. He featured special guest Bryson Tiller. Other performers included Chance the Rapper, Fat Joe, Remy Ma, Wiz Khalifa, Kehlani, Desiigner, Tory Lanez, and Young M.A.
November 5, 2016	92.3 The Real Show	Usher performed as the headliner for the concert held at The Forum in Inglewood, California, his special guests were Chris Brown and Master P. Other performers included Bryson Tiller, Ty Dolla $ign, Kid Ink, Desiigner and many others.
December 3, 2016	Hot 97 Hot for the Holidays!	Usher performed as the headliner for the concert held at Prudential Center in Newark, NJ, his special guest was Teyana Taylor. Other performers include T.I., Travis Scott, Young Thug, Joey Bada$$, Jidenna, Lil Yachty and Kehlani.
January 6–8, 2017	AT&T Playoff Playlist Live!	Three-day music festival at Curtis Hixon Waterfront Park. Eric Paslay, The Shadowboxes, Clare Dunn, and Flo Rida headlined the events.
March 2–5, 2017	Okeechobee Music & Arts Festival	Usher and The Roots performed as headliners for the festival in Florida. Other performers include the Kings of Leon, Bassnectar, The Lumineers, Flume, Wiz Khalifa, Solange, Rae Sremmurd, Young The Giant, Porter Robinson, Anderson .Paak and many more.
April 29, 2017	New Orleans Jazz & Heritage Festival	Usher and The Roots performed as the headliners for the event with over 500 acts across 12 stages during the festival's two weekends.
May 24–29, 2017	Soul Beach Festival	Usher and The Roots performed May 27 during the 17th Annual Soul Beach Music Festival in Aruba. Memorial Day Weekend, May 24–29, 2017.
July 5, 2017	Montreux Jazz Festival	Usher and The Roots performed at the Montreux Jazz Festival in Switzerland on July 5, 2017.
July 6–8, 2017	Openair Frauenfeld Festival	Usher and The Roots performed at the 2017 festival, Other acts included The Weeknd, Nas, G-Eazy, and German artist Cro.
July 15, 2017	Calgary Stampede	Usher and The Roots performed at the 2017 event at Scotiabank Saddledome on Saturday, July 15.
July 29, 2017	Cincinnati Music Festival	Usher performed as the headliner for the second night of the festival at Paul Brown Stadium in Cincinnati, Ohio Other performers included Mary J. Blige, Kem, Fantasia, Bell Biv Devoe, Anthony Hamilton and others.
July 21, 2018	Special Olympics	Usher performed at the anniversary concert of the Special Olympics. Other performers included Chance The Rapper, Jason Mraz, Francis and the Lights, Smokey Robinson, Daya and O.A.R also were on the line up.
December 2, 2018	Global Citizen Festival	Usher performed as the co-headliner for the festival in Johannesburg, South Africa to honor Nelson Mandela. Other co-headliners include Beyoncé, Jay-Z, Ed Sheeran, Pharrell Williams and Chris Martin.
May 3, 2019	The Trifecta Gala	Usher performed as the headliner for the event at KFC Yum Center in Louisville, Kentucky.
June 15, 2019	Smokin' Grooves Festival	Usher performed as co-headliner for the festival alongside Erykah Badu in Long Beach, California. Other performers included Ella Mai, T-Pain, Summer Walker, Ari Lennox, The-Dream and more guests.
September 8, 2019	ONE Music Fest	Usher performed during DJ KP The Great's set on the second day of the festival at Centennial Olympic Park in Atlanta, Georgia. Other performers included Pharrell, Lil Nas X, Wu-Tang Clan, Trey Songz, Monica, Busta Rhymes, Rick Ross, T Pain and many more.
October 23, 2019	Rakuten Optimism 2019	Usher performed as headliner for the annual event for digital innovation in e-commerce, marketing, and more in San Francisco, California.
December 6, 2019	Diriyah Festival	Usher performed as the co-headliner for the festival alongside Chris Brown and Akon in Saudi Arabia. The concert was held the night before the world heavyweight title boxing fight: The Clash On The Dunes.
December 28, 2019	Dream Weekend	Usher performed as co-headliner for the concert alongside Marshmello at Aloha Stadium in Halawa, Hawaii. Other performers included Ice Cube, Migos, and Saweetie.
September 19, 2020	iHeartRadio Music Festival	Usher performed the second night of the two-day virtual event at . Other performers included BTS, Coldplay, Miley Cyrus, Bon Jovi, Migos, Alicia Keys, Kane Brown, Swae Lee and others.
July 16, 2021 - January 1, 2022	Usher: The Las Vegas Residency	Usher performed as the headliner for his Residency at The Coliseum in Las Vegas, NV. Celebrities guest include Diddy, LeBron James, Kevin Hart, Halle Bailey, Summer Walker, Bobby Brown, Normani and many others.
May 6 — 8, 2022	Mary J. Blige x Pepsi Presents Strength Of A Woman Festival & Summit	Usher performed as a surprise guest during Mary J Blige’s set for the second night of the concert held at State Farm Arena in Atlanta, Georgia . Other performers included Ella Mai, Summer Walker, Chaka Khan, Xscape, City Girls, Queen Naija, Sevyn Streeter and many others.
May 14–15, 2022	Lovers & Friends Festival	Usher featuring Lil Jon and Ludacris performed as co-headliners alongside Lauryn Hill for both nights of the festival in Las Vegas, Nevada. The festival was named after their 2004 hit "Lovers & Friends". It featured other prominent Hip Hop and R&B acts from the 1990s and 2000s such as TLC, Jodeci, Ciara, Ne-Yo, Lil Kim, Trey Songz, Monica, Nelly, Ashanti, Ja Rule, Mýa, Ginuwine, T Pain, Akon, Fat Joe, Keith Sweat, SWV and many others.
June 17–19, 2022	Something In The Water Festival	Usher performed as the headliner for the first night of the three day festival held by Pharrell Williams in Washington, D.C., and featured guest acts Eric Bellinger and Vedo. Other performers included Pharrell Williams, Justin Timberlake, Lil Baby, Roddy Ricch, Chloe x Halle, T.I, Ashanti and Ja Rule, Davido, Lucky Daye, 6Lack, Clipse, Lil Uzi Vert and many others.
July 7, 2022	Beloved Benefit	Usher performed as co-headliner for the event alongside Maroon 5 honoring the late Senator John Lewis at Mercedes-Benz Stadium in Atlanta, GA.
July 15, 2022 - July 15, 2023	Usher: My Way - The Las Vegas Residency	Usher is performing as the headliner for his Residency at Dolby Live in Las Vegas, NV This is his second residency in Vegas and his first overall at MGM Grand Las Vegas.
September 24, 2022	Global Citizen Festival	Global Citizen Festival held two festivals on the same day to celebrate their 10-year anniversary with one being in NYC and the other in Accra, Ghana. Usher performed as the headliner for the festival held at Black Star Square in Accra, Ghana. Other performers on the lineup include Metallica, Mariah Carey, Charlie Puth, Jonas Brothers, H.E.R, SZA, Tems, Mickey Guyton and so many others.
October 8–9, 2022	ONE Music Fest	Usher performed as a surprise guest during the set of the City Girlss on the second day of the festival at Central Park in Atlanta, Georgia. Other performers included Lil Baby, Jazmine Sullivan, Tems, Rick Ross, Gucci Mane, Beenie Man, Jagged Edge, Ashanti, Ja Rule, Mýa, and many others.
November 17–20, 2022	Formula 1 Abu Dhabi After Race Concert	Usher performed as co-headliner for the first night alongside Dave at Etihad Park in Yas Island, Abu Dhabi. Other headliners included Kendrick Lamar, Swedish House Mafia and Def Leppard.
April 1–2, 2023	Dreamville Festival	Usher performed as co-headliner for the first night of the two day festival alongside Drake and the festival’s owner J.Cole at Dorothea Dix Park in Raleigh, North Carolina. Other performers included Lil Wayne, Burna Boy, City Girls, Lil Durk, Ari Lennox, Summer Walker, GloRilla, Sean Paul, Mario and many others.
May 6, 2023	Lovers & Friends Festival	Usher performed as co-headliner for the festival alongside Mariah Carey and Missy Elliott, his special guests were Summer Walker and Muni Long. The event which was name after his 2004 hit with Lil' Jon and Ludacris, "Lovers & Friends", was held by him at Las Vegas Festival Grounds in Las Vegas, Nevada. It featured other prominent Hip Hop and R&B acts of the 1990s and 2000s such as Christina Aguilera, Chris Brown, 50 Cent, Nelly, Busta Rhymes, Ginuwine, Lil' Kim, Boyz II Men, Sean Paul, Omarion, Flo Rida and many others.
June 2–4, 2023	Roots Picnic 2023	Usher performed as co-headliner alongside Lauryn Hill for the music festival held by The Roots at The Mann In Fairmount Park in Philadelphia, Pennsylvania, he closed out the last night of the festival. Other performers on the lineup included Lil Uzi Vert, Ari Lennox, City Girls, Maverick City Music, GloRilla, Lucky Daye, Busta Rhymes, Eve, Coco Jones, DVSN, Mary Mary and many others.
September 24 - October 5, 2023	Rendez-Vous Á Paris	Usher performed as the headliner for his residency at La Seine Musicale in Paris, France. Many celebrities have attended from Cher, Dwyane Wade and Gabrielle Union, Pharrell Williams, Tyga and many others.
December 5, 2023	Channel 95.5’s Jingle Ball	Usher performed as the headliner for the concert held at Little Caesars Arena in Detroit, Michigan. Other performers on the line up included Lil Durk, Jelly Roll, Big Time Rush, Flo Rida, Doechii, Kaliii and (G)I-DLE.
December 12, 2023	Q102’s Jingle Ball	Usher performed as the headliner for the concert held at Wells Fargo Center in Philadelphia, Pennsylvania. Other performers on the line up included OneRepublic, Jelly Roll, Big Time Rush, David Kushner, Doechii whr (G)I-DLE.
June 7, 2024	2024 Walmart Associate Celebration	Usher performed as the headliner for the event held at Bud Walton Arena in Fayetteville, Arkansas. Other performers included Lizzo, Backstreet Boys, Imagine Dragons, and Kacey Musgraves.
July 6–7, 2024	Essence Music Festival	Usher performed as headliner for the first night of the festival held at Caesars Superdome in New Orleans, Louisiana. Other performers included Janet Jackson, Victoria Monét, TGT, Charlie Wilson, Busta Rhymes, Cash Money Records and many others.

== Guest act ==
Date	Title	Notes
1997–98	Share My World Tour	Usher served as concert opener for the Share My World tour and the first major headlining tour by American recording R&B artist Mary J. Blige. The tour supports her multi-platinum album Share My World.
1998	The Velvet Rope Tour	Raymond opened for Janet Jackson was the third concert tour.
1998	No Way Out Tour	Raymond opened for the No Way Out Tour.
March 28, 2004	The Verizon Ladies First Tour	Beyoncé brought out Usher in Atlanta and the duo did a dancing performance "Naughty Girl" and "Yeah" at Philips Arena.
October 29, 2004	Best of Both Worlds Tour	Jay-Z finished Friday night's show with help from Ja Rule, Mary J. Blige, Foxy Brown and others was originally planned for R. Kelly.
October 1, 2011	Speak Now World Tour	Raymond and Taylor Swift performed "Yeah!" at Philips Arena.
February 23, 2013	So So Def 20th Anniversary Concert	Usher performed his number one hits accredited to Jermaine Dupri. He sang "Confessions", "U Got It Bad", and "Yeah!" with Ludacris and Lil Jon on stage for "Lovers and Friends".
April 19, 2014	Coachella Valley Music and Arts Festival	Usher was brought out as special guest by Pharrell to perform "U Don't Have to Call".
April 13, 2016	Purpose World Tour	Usher performed "U Got It Bad" with Justin Bieber on the Atlanta stop of his concert tour. He also performed "U Don't Have to Call" and "I Don't Mind".
April 25, 2014	Coachella Valley Music and Arts Festival	Usher was brought out as special guest by Major Lazer to perform.
March 28, 2015	Ultra Music Festival	Usher was brought out as special guest by Martin Garrix to perform their record "Don't Look Down".
May 20, 2016	Bad Boy Reunion Tour	Usher performed a dance routine to "U Don't Have to Call" then performing "I Need a Girl (Part One)" with Puff Daddy at Barclays.
May 3, 2017	Party Tour	Usher was brought out as special guest by Chris Brown to perform
August 3, 2017	Dave Chappelle & The Roots: Live From Radio City	Usher was brought out during Dave Chappelle's Radio City residency. Other special guest artists included The Roots, Chris Rock, Erykah Badu, Trevor Noah, Childish Gambino, Big Boy, T.I., Lil Wayne, Ice Cube, and more.
April 27, 2019	Something in the Water Festival	Usher was brought out during Pharrell for his inaugural Something in the Water Festival in Virginia Beach, VA. Other special guest artists included Jay-Z, Diddy, Missy Elliott, Timbaland, Gwen Stefani and Snoop Dogg.
June 25, 2019	Series Fest	Stevie Wonder brought out Usher during his performance at Red Rocks Amphitheater in Denver.
September 8, 2019	ONE Music Fest	Usher came out during DJ KP The Great's set on the second day of the ONE Music Festival in Atlanta, Georgia at Centennial Olympic Park. Other special guest artists included Pharrell, Wu-Tang Clan, Monica, Rick Ross, Waka Flocka Flame, and more.

== Tribute performances ==
Date	Event	Tribute Artist	Performed song(s)	Ref.
October 11, 2001	MTV Icon	Janet Jackson	"Miss You Much"; "Alright"; "If; "The Pleasure Principle"; "Rhythm Nation"; (dance medley with Mýa and Pink)	
September 20, 2002	The Oprah Winfrey Show	Luther Vandross	"Superstar"	
August 31, 2005	2005 World Music Awards	Destiny's Child	"Cater 2 U" (with Babyface); Nice & Slow	
July 7, 2009	Michael Jackson memorial service	Michael Jackson	"Gone Too Soon"	
January 31, 2010	52nd Annual Grammy Awards	Michael Jackson	"Earth Song" (with Celine Dion, Smokey Robinson, Carrie Underwood, and Jennifer Hudson)	
November 30, 2011	Grammy Nominations Concert Live	Nick Ashford	"You're All I Need to Get By"; Stand By Me"; (with Valarie Simpson)	
October 11, 2012	We Will Always Love You: A Grammy Salute to Whitney Houston	Whitney Houston	"I Believe in You and Me"	
April 18, 2013	Rock and Roll Hall of Fame	Quincy Jones	"Rock with You"	
May 1, 2014	iHeartRadio Music Awards	Michael Jackson	"Love Never Felt So Good"	
December 30, 2014	Kennedy Center Honors	Al Green	"Let's Stay Together"	
February 8, 2015	57th Annual Grammy Awards	Stevie Wonder	"If It's Magic"	
December 5, 2015	Sinatra 100: An All-Star Grammy Concert	Frank Sinatra	"That's Life"	
March 5, 2016	2016 BET Honors	LA Reid	"Rock Wit'cha"; "Roni"; "End of The Road"; "U Make Me Wanna"; "U Don't Have to Call"	
February 26, 2016	Ray Charles: Tribute In Performance at the White House	Ray Charles	"Georgia on My Mind"; "What'd I Say"	
June 16, 2017	Songwriters Hall of Fame	Jimmy Jam and Terry Lewis	"Sensitivity"; "Tender Love"; "Can You Stand The Rain"; "Gigolos Get Lonely Too"	
January 26, 2020	62nd Annual Grammy Awards	Prince	"Little Red Corvette"; "When Doves Cry"; "Kiss"	

== Award shows ==
Date	Event	City	Performed song(s)	Ref.
December 8, 1997	1997 Billboard Music Awards	Las Vegas	"You Make Me Wanna"	
February 27, 1998	1998 Soul Train Music Awards	Los Angeles	"You Make Me Wanna"; "Nice & Slow"	
September 10, 1998	1998 MTV Video Music Awards	Los Angeles	"My Way"	
December 8, 1998	1998 Billboard Music Awards	Las Vegas	"Nice & Slow"; "You Make Me Wanna"; "My Way"	
June 19, 2001	2001 BET Awards	Los Angeles	"U Remind Me	
August 12, 2001	2001 Teen Choice Awards	Los Angeles	"U Remind Me	
October 4, 2001	2001 MOBO Awards	London	"U Got it Bad"	
January 9, 2002	2002 American Music Awards	Los Angeles	"U Got it Bad"	
March 30, 2002	2002 Soul Train Music Awards	Los Angeles	"U Don't Have to Call"	
April 20, 2002	2002 Nickelodeon Kids' Choice Awards	Santa Monica	"U Don't Have to Call"	
June 25, 2002	2002 BET Awards	Los Angeles	"U Don't Have to Call"	
August 29, 2002	2002 MTV Video Music Awards	New York City	"Bad Boy for Life"/"I Need a Girl (Part One)/"I Need a Girl (Part Two)"/"Pass the Courvoisier, Part II" (with P. Diddy, Busta Rhymes, Ginuwine, and Pharrell)	
March 27, 2004	2004 Soul Train Music Awards	Los Angeles	"Yeah!" (with Lil Jon and Ludacris)	
June 29, 2004	2004 BET Awards	Los Angeles	"Yeah!"; (with Lil Jon and Ludacris) "Burn"	
August 29, 2004	2004 MTV Video Music Awards	Miami	"Confessions Part II"; "Yeah!"; (with Lil Jon and Ludacris)	
September 15, 2004	2004 World Music Awards	Las Vegas	"Yeah!"	
November 14, 2004	2004 American Music Awards	Los Angeles	"My Boo" (with Alicia Keys)	
November 18, 2004	2004 MTV Europe Music Awards	Rome	"My Boo" (with Alicia Keys)	
December 8, 2004	2004 Billboard Music Awards	Las Vegas	"Bad Girl"	
January 22, 2005	2005 NRJ Music Awards	Cannes	"Yeah!"	
February 13, 2005	47th Annual Grammy Awards	Los Angeles	"Caught Up"	
August 31, 2005	2005 World Music Awards	Los Angeles	"Cater 2 U" (with Babyface); Nice & Slow	
June 24, 2008	2008 BET Awards	Los Angeles	Love in This Club	
January 31, 2010	52nd Annual Grammy Awards	Los Angeles	"Earth Song" (with Celine Dion, Smokey Robinson, Carrie Underwood, and Jennifer Hudson)	
June 27, 2010	2010 BET Awards	Los Angeles	"There Goes My Baby"	
September 10, 2010	2010 BMI Urban Awards	Los Angeles	"OMG" (with will.i.am)	
September 12, 2010	2010 MTV Video Music Awards	Los Angeles	"DJ Got Us Falling in Love"; "OMG"	
November 21, 2010	2010 American Music Awards	Los Angeles	"DJ Got Us Fallin' in Love"	
January 22, 2011	2011 NRJ Music Awards	Cannes	"DJ Got Us Falling in Love"; "OMG"	
February 13, 2011	53rd Annual Grammy Awards	Los Angeles	"OMG" (with Justin Bieber)	
November 10, 2011	12th Annual Latin Grammy Awards	Las Vegas	"Promise" (with Romeo Santos)	
May 20, 2012	2012 Billboard Music Awards	Las Vegas	"Scream"	
July 1, 2012	2012 BET Awards	Los Angeles	"Climax"	
November 18, 2012	2012 American Music Awards	Los Angeles	"Numb"; "Climax"; "Can't Stop Won't Stop."	
May 1, 2014	2014 iHeartRadio Music Awards	Los Angeles	"Love Never Felt So Good"	
June 26, 2014	2014 ASCAP Rhythm & Soul Awards	Los Angeles"	"Confessions Part I "; "Confessions Part II"	
June 29, 2014	2014 BET Awards	Los Angeles	"Nice & Slow"; "Love in This Club"; Yeah!; "Confessions Part I"; "Confessions Part II"; "Follow Me"; "U Remind Me"; "U Don't Have to Call; "Caught Up"; "Good Kisser"	
August 24, 2014	2014 MTV Video Music Awards	Inglewood	"She Came to Give It to You"	
December 7, 2014	37th Kennedy Center Honors	Washington	"Let's Stay Together"	
February 8, 2015	57th Annual Grammy Awards	Los Angeles	"If It's Magic"	
June 27, 2016	2016 BET Awards	Los Angeles	"No Limit" (with Young Thug)	
January 26, 2020	62nd Annual Grammy Awards	Los Angeles	"Little Red Corvette"; "When Doves Cry"; "Kiss"	
June 28, 2020	2020 BET Awards	Virtual	"Come Thru" "You Make Me Wanna" (with Summer Walker)	
May 27, 2021	2021 iHeartRadio Music Awards	Los Angeles	"Confessions Part I"; "Love in This Club"; U Don't Have To Call; "DJ Got Us Falling In Love"; "Scream"; "OMG"; "Freak A Leek"; "Yeah!"; "Get Low" (with Lil Jon)	

== Performances at television shows and specials ==
Date	Event	Country	Performed song(s)	Ref.
1991	Star Search	United States	"End of The Road"	
February 25, 1995	Soul Train	United States	"Think Of You"	
March 18, 1995	All That	United States	"Think Of You"	
November 28, 1997	Chris Rock Show	United States	"You Make Me Wanna"	
December 31, 1997	Dick Clark's New Year's Rockin' Eve	United States	"You Make Me Wanna"	
January 17, 1998	All That	United States	"You Make Me Wanna"	
August 12, 1998	The Tonight Show with Jay Leno	United States	"My Way"	
February 2, 2001	Top of the Pops	United Kingdom	"Pop Ya Collar"	
December 16, 2001	Christmas in Washington	United States	"Santa Claus Is Comin' to Town" (with Mandy Moore)	
June 14, 2002	The Tonight Show with Jay Leno	United States	"U Got It Bad"	
June 14, 2002	Good Morning America	United States	"U Got It Bad"	
May 13, 2004	Jimmy Kimmel Live!	United States	"Yeah!"	
July 16, 2004	Top of the Pops	United Kingdom	"Burn"	
November 19, 2004	Top of the Pops	United Kingdom	"My Boo" (with Alicia Keys)	
September 6, 2007	Fashion Rocks	United States	"It's A Man's Man's Man's World"; Do I Do; (with Mary J. Blige)	
May 20, 2008	Dancing With The Stars	United States	"Love In This Club"; Yeah!	
June 3, 2008	The Tonight Show with Jay Leno	United States	"Love In This Club	
December 3, 2008	2008 Victoria's Secret Fashion Show	United States	"What's Your Name"; Yeah!; "This Ain't Sex"	
January 20, 2009	First inauguration of Barack Obama	United States	"Higher Ground" (with Stevie Wonder and Shakira)	
December 20, 2009	Christmas in Washington	United States	"I Heard the Bells on Christmas Day"; "Have Yourself A Merry Little Christmas"	
March 3, 2010	American Idol	United States	"OMG"	
March 29, 2010	Late Show with David Letterman	United States	"OMG"	
March 30, 2010	Good Morning America	United States	"There Goes My Baby"; "Hey Daddy"	
March 31, 2010	American Idol	United States	"OMG"	
April 1, 2010	The Ellen DeGeneres Show	United States	"OMG"	
April 1, 2010	Lopez Tonight	United States	"Hey Daddy"	
April 2, 2010	CBS Early Show	United States	"OMG"	
June 2, 2010	Lopez Tonight	United States	"There Goes My Baby"	
June 7, 2010	The Graham Norton Show	United Kingdom	"Lil Freak"	
June 10, 2010	The View	United States	"There Goes My Baby"	
August 20, 2010	Good Morning America	United States	"DJ Got Us Falling in Love"; "OMG"	
November 10, 2010	The X Factor UK	United Kingdom	"DJ Got Us Falling in Love"; "OMG"	
February 6, 2011	Super Bowl XLV halftime show	United States	"OMG" (with The Black Eyed Peas)	
May 12, 2012	Saturday Night Live	United States	"Scream"; "Climax"	
October 24, 2012	The Graham Norton Show	United Kingdom	"Scream"	
December 12, 2012	The Ellen DeGeneres Show	United States	"Numb"	
January 20, 2013	Second inauguration of Barack Obama	United States	"OMG"; "Scream"; "DJ Got Us Falling In Love"	
May 6, 2013	The Voice	United States	"Superstition" (with Adam Levine)	
May 21, 2013	The Voice	United States	"The Look of Love" (with Michelle Chamuel & Josiah Hawley)	
June 10, 2013	The Voice	United States	"Twisted"	
June 17, 2013	The Voice	United States	"With a Little Help from My Friends" (with Adam Levine, Shakira, and Blake Shelton)	
June 17, 2013	The Voice	United States	"One" (with Michelle Chamuel)	
April 29, 2014	The Voice	United States	"Always on the Run" (with Bria Kelly and Josh Kaufman)	
May 12, 2014	The Voice	United States	"Good Kisser"	
May 19, 2014	The Voice	United States	"Untitled (How Does It Feel)" (with Adam Levine)	
September 5, 2014	The Today Show	United States	"She Came to Give It to You"; "U Don't Have to Call"; "Caught Up"; "OMG"; "Good Kisser"	
September 9, 2014	Fashion Rocks	United States	"She Came to Give It to You"	
October 19, 2014	The Graham Norton Show	United Kingdom	"Good Kisser"	
December 15, 2015	The Voice	United States	"Without You" (with Jordan Smith)	
January 8, 2016	A Celebration of American Creativity: In Performance at the White House	United States	Save The Children; Mercy Mercy Me	
July 28, 2016	Late Night with Jimmy Fallon	United States	"Crash"	
September 13, 2016	The Ellen DeGeneres Show	United States	"Crash"	
September 21, 2016	Jimmy Kimmel Live!	United States	"No Limit"	
October 24, 2016	Love and Happiness: A Musical Experience at the White House	United States		
December 31, 2019	Dick Clark's New Year's Rockin' Eve	United States	"OMG"; "Yeah!"	
