= Must Be Love =

Must Be Love may refer to:

- "Must Be Love" (Cassie song), 2009
- "Must Be Love" (Christina Grimmie song), 2014
- "Must Be Love", a 2004 song by FYA and Smujji
- Must Be... Love, a 2013 Filipino film

== See also ==
- It Must Be Love (disambiguation)
