= 8701 Evolution Tour =

2002 concert tour by Usher

- Tour by Usher
- Promotional poster for the tour
- Associated album: 8701
- Start date: April 25, 2002
- End date: July 7, 2002
- Legs: 3
- No. of shows: 46

Usher concert chronology
- 8701 Evolution Tour (2002); Truth Tour (2004)

8701 Evolution Tour was the debut concert tour by American recording artist Usher. Visiting North America, Asia, Canada, and Africa the tour accompanies his third studio album, 8701 (2001). Following a milestone, 8701 sold 6 million copies worldwide and spawning two Billboard Hot 100 number one singles "U Remind Me", "U Got It Bad" and hit song "U Don't Have To Call".

== Background ==
Usher originally planned to embark on a supporting tour for the album with a starting date of November 29, 2001 in Baltimore to an end date of December 30 in Los Angeles. Titled by his fans the Evolution 8701 Tour, the original tour plan—to which Usher would perform in venues that held 5,000 to 12,000 seats—was postponed, due to Usher dislocating his shoulder during a rehearsal. Once recovered, Usher announced new tour dates, and commented: "I'm really looking forward to getting out and performing live onstage. Now that my arm is healed, I'm ready to get out there and interact with my fans. Nothing compares to that excitement and energy." Usher would perform in over forty North America Cities, with opening acts including singer Faith Evans, and rappers Nas and Mr. Cheeks. The tour commenced on April 25, 2002, in Denver and concluded on July 7, 2002, in New Orleans.

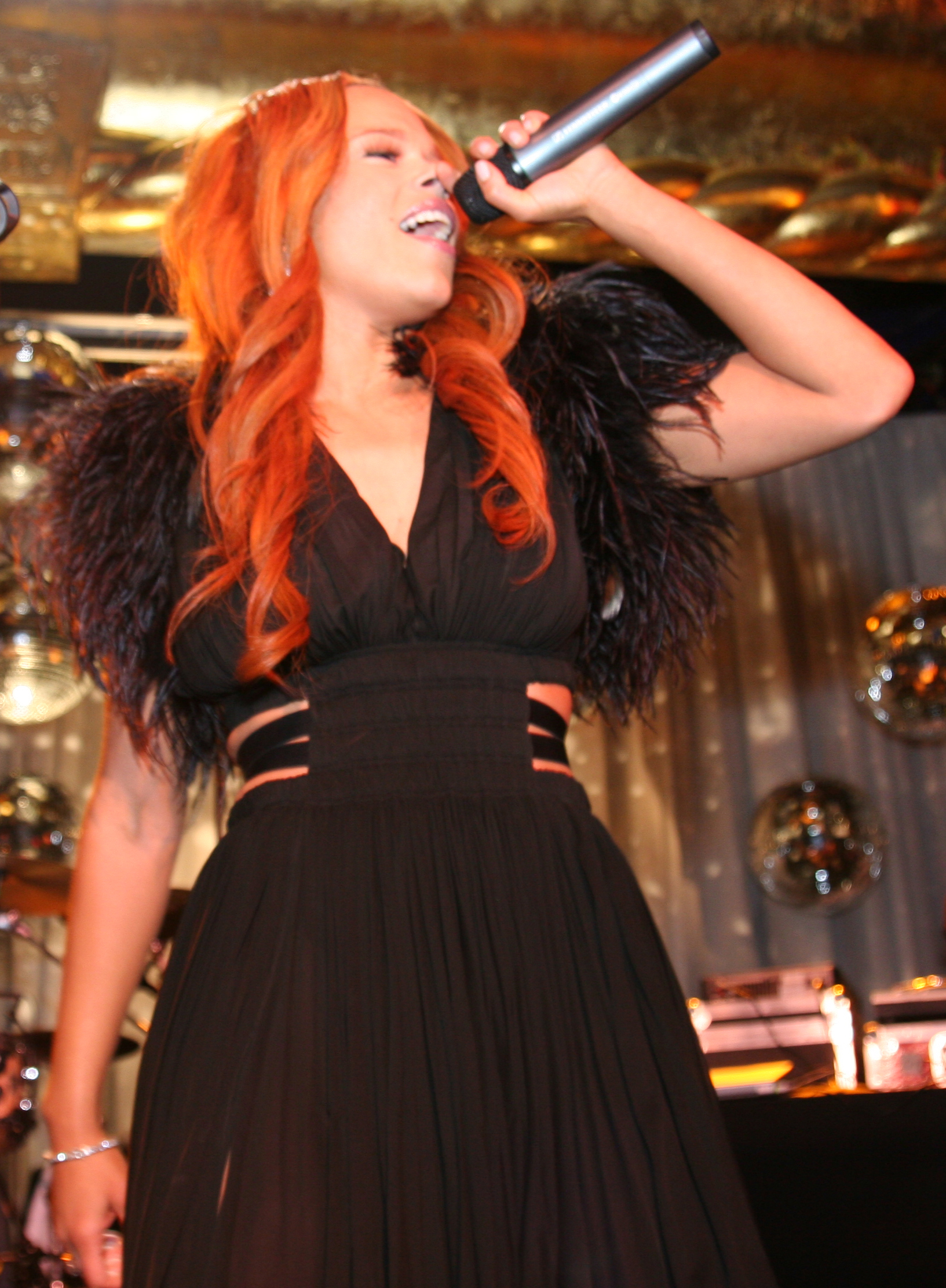
American singer Faith Evans (pictured) was one of the opening acts for the tour.

== Concert synopsis ==
The show began with his guitarist playing the National Anthem proceeding with an introduction in the background while his dancers hit the stage, Usher emerges jumping from the top of the spiral stage wearing a leather vest and shorts. Kicking off with "I Don’t Know" then going into "If I Want To" sparkles and pyrotechnics off his latest, 8701. During "Just Like Me" Leah Greenblatt said "Usher acted as the eye of a sexed-up storm, surrounded by dancers who gyrated and moved up and down a stripper's pole with skills not learned at Arthur Murray." Next he performed "I Can't Let U Go" white wearing a leather bandana and black shredded shirt he rips off. He exited again for another costume change as a video showed him and one of his dancers engaging in a dance seduction, fading to black just in PG-13 time. Next, donning a white fedora and coat, Usher emerged for "Bedtime" and "Nice and Slow." The intro to "U Got it Bad" presented flashes on lighting as he walked from top of the spiraling stage to the main stage where his mic stand. Leading the crowd in a "U Don’t Have to Call" sing. He ended his performance remembering loved ones they had lost, flashing the names of the Notorious B.I.G., Tupac Shakur, Aaliyah and Lisa "Left Eye" Lopes on an overhead screen as he segued into Marvin Gaye's "What's Going On." After introducing his band and dancers, he got the crowd to flash peace and love signs.

== Set list ==
1. "National Anthem into Bio Video"
2. "I Don't Know"
3. "If I Want To"
4. "Just Like Me"
5. "I Can't Let U Go"
6. "Romantic Transition Video"
7. "Bedtime"
8. "Nice & Slow"
9. "I Need a Girl"
10. "Twork It Out"
11. "8701 Interlude"/"U Got It Bad"
12. "My Way"
13. "You Make Me Wanna..."
14. "U Remind Me"
15. "U Don't Have to Call"
16. "What's Going On"

== Critical reception ==
The tour garnered generally positive reviews from critics. Randy Lewis from the Los Angeles Times stated "The choreography was sporadically dazzling, and in a brief solo number near the end of the show, he suddenly pulled together a routine hinting that he might give Prince or Michael Jackson of yore a run for their money." A reporter from the San Francisco Chronicle says "Usher is so smooth, he literally slides. Usher arrived with a burst of fireworks and an energetic performance and showed why he's made a successful transition. The audience loved it all and sang along lustily to a string of hits." Soren Baker from the Cincinnati Enquirer praised "the 23-year-old Atlantan proved you can sing and dance at the same time. Of course, that's how James Brown, Jackie Wilson and Usher's most obvious role model Michael Jackson did it, but in today's high-tech, gimmicky concerts, it's a lost art."

== Opening acts ==
- Faith Evans
- Nas
- Mr. Cheeks

== Tour dates ==
Date	City	Country	Venue
North America
April 25, 2002	Denver	United States	Pepsi Center
April 26, 2002	Albuquerque	United States	Journal Pavilion
April 27, 2002	Phoenix	United States	Cricket Wireless Pavilion
April 28, 2002	Las Vegas	United States	Mandalay Bay Events Center
May 2, 2002	San Diego	United States	Coors Amphitheatre
May 3, 2002	Irvine	United States	Verizon Wireless Amphitheatre
May 4, 2002	Sacramento	United States	Valley Amphitheatre
May 5, 2002	Concord	United States	Concord Pavilion
May 8, 2002	Calgary	Canada	Pengrowth Saddledome
May 10, 2002	Vancouver	Canada	General Motors Place
May 11, 2002	Seattle	United States	KeyArena
May 12, 2002	Portland	United States	Rose Garden Arena
May 16, 2002	Minneapolis	United States	Target Center
May 17, 2002	Tinley Park	United States	Tweeter Center
May 18, 2002	Maryland Heights	United States	Verizon Wireless Amphitheater
May 19, 2002	Bonner Springs	United States	Sandstone Amphitheater
May 23, 2002	Columbus	United States	Polaris Amphitheater
May 24, 2002	Cincinnati	United States	Riverbend Music Center
May 25, 2002	Clarkston	United States	Pine Knob Music Theatre
May 26, 2002	Cleveland	United States	Gund Arena
May 30, 2002	Nashville	United States	AmSouth Amphitheatre
May 31, 2002	Charlotte	United States	Verizon Wireless Amphitheatre
June 1, 2002	Raleigh	United States	Alltel Pavilion
June 2, 2002	Virginia Beach	United States	Verizon Wireless Amphitheatre
June 6, 2002	Miami	United States	American Airlines Arena
June 7, 2002	Atlanta	United States	Chastain Park
June 8, 2002	Tampa	United States	Ice Palace
June 11, 2002	Orlando	United States	TD Waterhouse Centre
June 13, 2002	Holmdel	United States	PNC Bank Arts Center
June 14, 2002	Wantagh	United States	Jones Beach Theater
June 15, 2002	Mansfield	United States	Tweeter Center
June 16, 2002	Camden	United States	Tweeter Center
June 20, 2002	Toronto	Canada	Air Canada Centre
June 21, 2002	Albany	United States	Pepsi Arena
June 22, 2002	Hartford	United States	ctnow.com Meadows Music Theatre
June 23, 2002	Buffalo	United States	HSBC Arena
June 27, 2002	Noblesville	United States	Verizon Wireless Amphitheatre
June 28, 2002	Hershey	United States	Hersheypark Stadium
June 29, 2002	Bristow	United States	Nissan Pavilion
June 30, 2002	Burgettstown	United States	Post-Gazette Pavilion
July 4, 2002	Selma	United States	Verizon Wireless Amphitheatre
July 5, 2002	Dallas	United States	Smirnoff Music Center
July 6, 2002	Houston	United States	Compaq Center
July 7, 2002	New Orleans	United States	Louisiana Superdome

== Personnel ==
- Keys: Rudolfo Valdez Brantley & Buddy Strong
- Drums: Mike 'Big Mike' Clemons
- Guitar & Keys: Natural
