= List of Billboard Rhythmic number-one songs of the 1990s =

The Billboard Rhythmic chart debuted in the issue dated October 3, 1992, as the Top 40/Rhythm-Crossover chart, alongside the Top 40/Mainstream chart (now called Mainstream Top 40). Weekly rankings are "compiled from a national sample of airplay" as measured by Nielsen BDS monitoring rhythmic radios stations continuously. The first number-one song on both charts was "End of the Road" by Boyz II Men.

On June 25, 1997, the chart was renamed to Rhythmic Top 40 as a way to distinguish stations that continued to play a broad based rhythmic mix from those whose mix leaned heavily toward R&B and hip-hop. Prior to the Billboard Hot 100 becoming an all-genre songs chart in December 1998, the Rhythmic Top 40's panel of radio stations monitored by BDS made up one portion of stations measured towards the airplay component of the Hot 100 (alongside Mainstream Top 40, Adult Top 40, Adult Contemporary, and Modern Rock stations).

Below are the songs that reached number one on the chart from its inception to the end of 1999 in chronological order.

== Number-one rhythmic hits of the 1990s ==
Reached number one	Song	Artist(s)
1992
October 3	"End of the Road"	Boyz II Men
October 10	"End of the Road"	Boyz II Men
October 17	"End of the Road"	Boyz II Men
October 24	"End of the Road"	Boyz II Men
October 31	"End of the Road"	Boyz II Men
November 7	"End of the Road"	Boyz II Men
November 14	"What About Your Friends"	TLC
November 21	"Real Love"	Mary J. Blige
November 28	"If I Ever Fall in Love"	Shai
December 5	"I Will Always Love You"	Whitney Houston
December 12	"I Will Always Love You"	Whitney Houston
December 19	"I Will Always Love You"	Whitney Houston
December 26	"I Will Always Love You"	Whitney Houston
1993
January 2	"I Will Always Love You"	Whitney Houston
January 9	"I Will Always Love You"	Whitney Houston
January 16	"I Will Always Love You"	Whitney Houston
January 23	"I Will Always Love You"	Whitney Houston
January 30	"I Will Always Love You"	Whitney Houston
February 6	"I Will Always Love You"	Whitney Houston
February 13	"Here We Go Again!"	Portrait
February 20	"Don't Walk Away"	Jade
February 27	"Freak Me"	Silk
March 6	"Freak Me"	Silk
March 13	"Freak Me"	Silk
March 20	"Freak Me"	Silk
March 27	"Freak Me"	Silk
April 3	"Freak Me"	Silk
April 10	"Freak Me"	Silk
April 17	"Freak Me"	Silk
April 24	"Freak Me"	Silk
May 1	"Freak Me"	Silk
May 8	"Freak Me"	Silk
May 15	"Freak Me"	Silk
May 22	"Freak Me"	Silk
May 29	"That's the Way Love Goes"	Janet Jackson
June 5	"That's the Way Love Goes"	Janet Jackson
June 12	"That's the Way Love Goes"	Janet Jackson
June 19	"Weak"	SWV
June 26	"Weak"	SWV
July 3	"Weak"	SWV
July 10	"Weak"	SWV
July 17	"Weak"	SWV
July 24	"Weak"	SWV
July 31	"Weak"	SWV
August 7	"Weak"	SWV
August 14	"Lately"	Jodeci
August 21	"Lately"	Jodeci
August 28	"Right Here/Human Nature"	SWV
September 4	"Right Here/Human Nature"	SWV
September 11	"Right Here/Human Nature"	SWV
September 18	"Dreamlover"	Mariah Carey
September 25	"Dreamlover"	Mariah Carey
October 2	"Dreamlover"	Mariah Carey
October 9	"Dreamlover"	Mariah Carey
October 16	"Dreamlover"	Mariah Carey
October 23	"Dreamlover"	Mariah Carey
October 30	"Just Kickin' It"	Xscape
November 6	"Just Kickin' It"	Xscape
November 13	"Just Kickin' It"	Xscape
November 20	"Just Kickin' It"	Xscape
November 27	"Just Kickin' It"	Xscape
December 4	"Shoop"	Salt-n-Pepa
December 11	"Shoop"	Salt-n-Pepa
December 18	"Shoop"	Salt-n-Pepa
December 25	"Shoop"	Salt-n-Pepa
1994
January 1	"Shoop"	Salt-n-Pepa
January 8	"Shoop"	Salt-n-Pepa
January 15	"Shoop"	Salt-n-Pepa
January 22	"Shoop"	Salt-n-Pepa
January 29	"Shoop"	Salt-n-Pepa
February 5	"Shoop"	Salt-n-Pepa
February 12	"Shoop"	Salt-n-Pepa
February 19	"Whatta Man"	Salt-n-Pepa featuring En Vogue
February 26	"Whatta Man"	Salt-n-Pepa featuring En Vogue
March 5	"So Much in Love"	All-4-One
March 12	"So Much in Love"	All-4-One
March 19	"Whatta Man"	Salt-n-Pepa featuring En Vogue
March 26	"Whatta Man"	Salt-n-Pepa featuring En Vogue
April 2	"Bump n' Grind"	R. Kelly
April 9	"Bump n' Grind"	R. Kelly
April 16	"Bump n' Grind"	R. Kelly
April 23	"Bump n' Grind"	R. Kelly
April 30	"Bump n' Grind"	R. Kelly
May 7	"Bump n' Grind"	R. Kelly
May 14	"Bump n' Grind"	R. Kelly
May 21	"I Swear"	All-4-One
May 28	"I Swear"	All-4-One
June 4	"I Swear"	All-4-One
June 11	"I Swear"	All-4-One
June 18	"I Swear"	All-4-One
June 25	"Any Time, Any Place" / "And On & On"	Janet Jackson
July 2	"Any Time, Any Place" / "And On & On"	Janet Jackson
July 9	"Back & Forth"	Aaliyah
July 16	"Back & Forth"	Aaliyah
July 23	"Back & Forth"	Aaliyah
July 30	"Back & Forth"	Aaliyah
August 6	"Back & Forth"	Aaliyah
August 13	"Any Time, Any Place" / "And On & On"	Janet Jackson
August 20	"Funkdafied"	Da Brat
August 27	"I'll Make Love to You"	Boyz II Men
September 3	"I'll Make Love to You"	Boyz II Men
September 10	"I'll Make Love to You"	Boyz II Men
September 17	"I'll Make Love to You"	Boyz II Men
September 24	"I'll Make Love to You"	Boyz II Men
October 1	"I'll Make Love to You"	Boyz II Men
October 8	"I'll Make Love to You"	Boyz II Men
October 15	"I'll Make Love to You"	Boyz II Men
October 22	"I'll Make Love to You"	Boyz II Men
October 29	"I'll Make Love to You"	Boyz II Men
November 5	"I'll Make Love to You"	Boyz II Men
November 12	"I'll Make Love to You"	Boyz II Men
November 19	"Here Comes the Hotstepper"	Ini Kamoze
November 26	"Here Comes the Hotstepper"	Ini Kamoze
December 3	"On Bended Knee"	Boyz II Men
December 10	"On Bended Knee"	Boyz II Men
December 17	"On Bended Knee"	Boyz II Men
December 24	"On Bended Knee"	Boyz II Men
December 31	"On Bended Knee"	Boyz II Men
1995
January 7	"On Bended Knee"	Boyz II Men
January 14	"On Bended Knee"	Boyz II Men
January 21	"On Bended Knee"	Boyz II Men
January 28	"Creep"	TLC
February 4	"Creep"	TLC
February 11	"Creep"	TLC
February 18	"Creep"	TLC
February 25	"Creep"	TLC
March 4	"Creep"	TLC
March 11	"Candy Rain"	Soul for Real
March 18	"Candy Rain"	Soul for Real
March 25	"Candy Rain"	Soul for Real
April 1	"Red Light Special"	TLC
April 8	"Candy Rain"	"Soul for Real"
April 15	"Red Light Special"	TLC
April 22	"This Is How We Do It"	Montell Jordan
April 29	"This Is How We Do It"	Montell Jordan
May 6	"This Is How We Do It"	Montell Jordan
May 13	"This Is How We Do It"	Montell Jordan
May 20	"This Is How We Do It"	Montell Jordan
May 27	"This Is How We Do It"	Montell Jordan
June 3	"This Is How We Do It"	Montell Jordan
June 10	"Freak Like Me"	Adina Howard
June 17	"Don't Take It Personal (Just One of Dem Days)"	Monica
June 24	"Don't Take It Personal (Just One of Dem Days)"	Monica
July 1	"Don't Take It Personal (Just One of Dem Days)"	Monica
July 8	"Don't Take It Personal (Just One of Dem Days)"	Monica
July 15	"Don't Take It Personal (Just One of Dem Days)"	Monica
July 22	"Don't Take It Personal (Just One of Dem Days)"	Monica
July 29	"Don't Take It Personal (Just One of Dem Days)"	Monica
August 5	"Waterfalls"	TLC
August 12	"Waterfalls"	TLC
August 19	"He's Mine"	MoKenStef
August 26	"He's Mine"	MoKenStef
September 2	"He's Mine"	MoKenStef
September 9	"He's Mine"	MoKenStef
September 16	"You Are Not Alone"	Michael Jackson
September 23	"Fantasy"	Mariah Carey
September 30	"You Are Not Alone"	Michael Jackson
October 7	Fantasy	Mariah Carey
October 14	Fantasy	Mariah Carey
October 21	Fantasy	Mariah Carey
October 28	Fantasy	Mariah Carey
November 4	Fantasy	Mariah Carey
November 11	Fantasy	Mariah Carey
November 18	Fantasy	Mariah Carey
November 25	Fantasy	Mariah Carey
December 2	Fantasy	Mariah Carey
December 9	Fantasy	Mariah Carey
December 16	"One Sweet Day"	Mariah Carey and Boyz II Men
December 23	"One Sweet Day"	Mariah Carey and Boyz II Men
December 30	"One Sweet Day"	Mariah Carey and Boyz II Men
1996
January 6	"One Sweet Day"	Mariah Carey and Boyz II Men
January 13	"One Sweet Day"	Mariah Carey and Boyz II Men
January 20	"One Sweet Day"	Mariah Carey and Boyz II Men
January 27	"One Sweet Day"	Mariah Carey and Boyz II Men
February 3	"One Sweet Day"	Mariah Carey and Boyz II Men
February 10	"One Sweet Day"	Mariah Carey and Boyz II Men
February 17	"Nobody Knows"	Tony Rich Project
February 24	"Sittin' Up in My Room"	Brandy
March 2	"Sittin' Up in My Room"	Brandy
March 9	"Sittin' Up in My Room"	Brandy
March 16	"Sittin' Up in My Room"	Brandy
March 23	"Always Be My Baby"	Mariah Carey
March 30	"Always Be My Baby"	Mariah Carey
April 6	"Always Be My Baby"	Mariah Carey
April 13	"Always Be My Baby"	Mariah Carey
April 20	"Always Be My Baby"	Mariah Carey
April 27	"Killing Me Softly"	The Fugees
May 4	"Killing Me Softly"	The Fugees
May 11	"Killing Me Softly"	The Fugees
May 18	"Killing Me Softly"	The Fugees
May 25	"Killing Me Softly"	The Fugees
June 1	"Killing Me Softly"	The Fugees
June 8	"Killing Me Softly"	The Fugees
June 15	"Killing Me Softly"	The Fugees
June 22	"Killing Me Softly"	The Fugees
June 29	"Tha Crossroads"	Bone Thugs-N-Harmony
July 6	"Tha Crossroads"	Bone Thugs-N-Harmony
July 13	"Tha Crossroads"	Bone Thugs-N-Harmony
July 20	"Tha Crossroads"	Bone Thugs-N-Harmony
July 27	"Tha Crossroads"	Bone Thugs-N-Harmony
August 3	"Twisted"	Keith Sweat
August 10	"Twisted"	Keith Sweat
August 17	"Twisted"	Keith Sweat
August 24	"Twisted"	Keith Sweat
August 31	"Twisted"	Keith Sweat
September 7	"Twisted"	Keith Sweat
September 14	"Twisted"	Keith Sweat
September 21	"Twisted"	Keith Sweat
September 28	"Twisted"	Keith Sweat
October 5	"Twisted"	Keith Sweat
October 12	"Twisted"	Keith Sweat
October 19	"Twisted"	Keith Sweat
October 26	"Twisted"	Keith Sweat
November 2	"Twisted"	Keith Sweat
November 9	"No Diggity"	BLACKstreet featuring Dr. Dre
November 16	"No Diggity"	BLACKstreet featuring Dr. Dre
November 23	"No Diggity"	BLACKstreet featuring Dr. Dre
November 30	"No Diggity"	BLACKstreet featuring Dr. Dre
December 7	"Un-Break My Heart"	Toni Braxton
December 14	"Nobody"	Keith Sweat featuring Athena Cage
December 21	"Un-Break My Heart"	Toni Braxton
December 28	"Un-Break My Heart"	Toni Braxton
1997
January 4	"Un-Break My Heart"	Toni Braxton
January 11	"Un-Break My Heart"	Toni Braxton
January 18	"Un-Break My Heart"	Toni Braxton
January 25	"Un-Break My Heart"	Toni Braxton
February 1	"Un-Break My Heart"	Toni Braxton
February 8	"Un-Break My Heart"	Toni Braxton
February 15	"Don't Let Go (Love)"	En Vogue
February 22	"Wannabe"	Spice Girls
March 1	"Wannabe"	Spice Girls
March 8	"Wannabe"	Spice Girls
March 15	"Wannabe"	Spice Girls
March 22	"Wannabe"	Spice Girls
March 29	"Return of the Mack"	Mark Morrison
April 5	"Return of the Mack"	Mark Morrison
April 12	"Return of the Mack"	Mark Morrison
April 19	"Return of the Mack"	Mark Morrison
April 26	"Don't Leave Me"	BLACKstreet
May 3	"Don't Leave Me"	BLACKstreet
May 10	"Return of the Mack"	Mark Morrison
May 17	"Return of the Mack"	Mark Morrison
May 24	"Don't Leave Me"	BLACKstreet
May 31	"Return of the Mack"	Mark Morrison
June 7	"Don't Leave Me"	BLACKstreet
June 14	"Return of the Mack"	Mark Morrison
June 21	"Return of the Mack"	Mark Morrison
June 28	"I'll Be Missing You"	Puff Daddy & Faith Evans featuring 112
July 5	"I'll Be Missing You"	Puff Daddy & Faith Evans featuring 112
July 12	"I'll Be Missing You"	Puff Daddy & Faith Evans featuring 112
July 19	"I'll Be Missing You"	Puff Daddy & Faith Evans featuring 112
July 26	"I'll Be Missing You"	Puff Daddy & Faith Evans featuring 112
August 2	"Men in Black"	Will Smith
August 9	"Men in Black"	Will Smith
August 16	"Men in Black"	Will Smith
August 23	"Men in Black"	Will Smith
August 30	"Men in Black"	Will Smith
September 6	"Men in Black"	Will Smith
September 13	"Men in Black"	Will Smith
September 20	"Men in Black"	Will Smith
September 27	"Honey"	Mariah Carey
October 4	"Honey"	Mariah Carey
October 11	"Honey"	Mariah Carey
October 18	"You Make Me Wanna..."	Usher
October 25	"You Make Me Wanna..."	Usher
November 1	"You Make Me Wanna..."	Usher
November 8	"You Make Me Wanna..."	Usher
November 15	"You Make Me Wanna..."	Usher
November 22	"You Make Me Wanna..."	Usher
November 29	"You Make Me Wanna..."	Usher
December 6	"You Make Me Wanna..."	Usher
December 13	"You Make Me Wanna..."	Usher
December 20	"You Make Me Wanna..."	Usher
December 27	"You Make Me Wanna..."	Usher
1998
January 3	"You Make Me Wanna..."	Usher
January 10	"My Love Is the Shhh!"	Somethin' for the People featuring Trina & Tamara
January 17	"You Make Me Wanna..."	Usher
January 24	"All My Life"	K-Ci & JoJo
January 31	"All My Life"	K-Ci & JoJo
February 7	"All My Life"	K-Ci & JoJo
February 14	"All My Life"	K-Ci & JoJo
February 21	"All My Life"	K-Ci & JoJo
February 28	"All My Life"	K-Ci & JoJo
March 7	"All My Life"	K-Ci & JoJo
March 14	"Nice & Slow"	Usher
March 21	"Nice & Slow"	Usher
March 28	"Nice & Slow"	Usher
April 4	"Anytime"	Brian McKnight
April 11	"Anytime"	Brian McKnight
April 18	"Anytime"	Brian McKnight
April 25	"Anytime"	Brian McKnight
May 2	"Too Close"	Next
May 9	"Too Close"	Next
May 16	"Too Close"	Next
May 23	"Too Close"	Next
May 30	"Too Close"	Next
June 6	"Too Close"	Next
June 13	"Too Close"	Next
June 20	"The Boy Is Mine"	Brandy and Monica
June 27	"The Boy Is Mine"	Brandy and Monica
July 4	"The Boy Is Mine"	Brandy and Monica
July 11	"The Boy Is Mine"	Brandy and Monica
July 18	"The Boy Is Mine"	Brandy and Monica
July 25	"The Boy Is Mine"	Brandy and Monica
August 1	"The Boy Is Mine"	Brandy and Monica
August 8	"The Boy Is Mine"	Brandy and Monica
August 15	"The Boy Is Mine"	Brandy and Monica
August 22	"Are You That Somebody?"	Aaliyah
August 29	"Are You That Somebody?"	Aaliyah
September 5	"Are You That Somebody?"	Aaliyah
September 12	"Are You That Somebody?"	Aaliyah
September 19	"Are You That Somebody?"	Aaliyah
September 26	"Are You That Somebody?"	Aaliyah
October 3	"Are You That Somebody?"	Aaliyah
October 10	"Are You That Somebody?"	Aaliyah
October 17	"Are You That Somebody?"	Aaliyah
October 24	"Are You That Somebody?"	Aaliyah
October 31	"Touch It"	Monifah
November 7	"Doo Wop (That Thing)"	Lauryn Hill
November 14	"Doo Wop (That Thing)"	Lauryn Hill
November 21	"Doo Wop (That Thing)"	Lauryn Hill
November 28	"How Deep Is Your Love"	Dru Hill featuring Redman
December 5	"How Deep Is Your Love"	Dru Hill featuring Redman
December 12	"How Deep Is Your Love"	Dru Hill featuring Redman
December 19	"How Deep Is Your Love"	Dru Hill featuring Redman
December 26	"Have You Ever?"	Brandy
1999
January 2	Have You Ever?	Brandy
January 9	Have You Ever?	Brandy
January 16	Have You Ever?	Brandy
January 23	Have You Ever?	Brandy
January 30	Have You Ever?	Brandy
February 6	Have You Ever?	Brandy
February 13	Have You Ever?	Brandy
February 20	Have You Ever?	Brandy
February 27	"Angel of Mine"	Monica
March 6	"Angel of Mine"	Monica
March 13	"No Scrubs"	TLC
March 20	"No Scrubs"	TLC
March 27	"No Scrubs"	TLC
April 3	"No Scrubs"	TLC
April 10	"No Scrubs"	TLC
April 17	"No Scrubs"	TLC
April 24	"No Scrubs"	TLC
May 1	"No Scrubs"	TLC
May 8	"No Scrubs"	TLC
May 15	"No Scrubs"	TLC
May 22	"No Scrubs"	TLC
May 29	"No Scrubs"	TLC
June 5	"No Scrubs"	TLC
June 12	"No Scrubs"	TLC
June 19	"No Scrubs"	TLC
June 26	"Livin' la Vida Loca"	Ricky Martin
July 3	"Where My Girls At"	702
July 10	"Where My Girls At"	702
July 17	"Where My Girls At"	702
July 24	"If You Had My Love"	Jennifer Lopez
July 31	"If You Had My Love"	Jennifer Lopez
August 7	"Where My Girls At"	702
August 14	"Where My Girls At"	702
August 21	"Genie in a Bottle"	Christina Aguilera
August 28	"Genie in a Bottle"	Christina Aguilera
September 4	"Genie in a Bottle"	Christina Aguilera
September 11	"Genie in a Bottle"	Christina Aguilera
September 18	"Genie in a Bottle"	Christina Aguilera
September 25	"Genie in a Bottle"	Christina Aguilera
October 2	"Genie in a Bottle"	Christina Aguilera
October 9	"Genie in a Bottle"	Christina Aguilera
October 16	"Genie in a Bottle"	Christina Aguilera
October 23	"Genie in a Bottle"	Christina Aguilera
October 30	"Mambo No. 5 (A Little Bit Of...)"	Lou Bega
November 6	"Mambo No. 5 (A Little Bit Of...)"	Lou Bega
November 13	"Back at One"	Brian McKnight
November 20	"Back at One"	Brian McKnight
November 27	"Back at One"	Brian McKnight
December 4	"Bring It All to Me"	Blaque
December 11	"Back at One"	Brian McKnight
December 18	"Bring It All to Me"	Blaque
December 25	"Bring It All to Me"	Blaque

== See also ==
- 1990s in music
- List of Billboard Hot 100 number-one singles of the 1990s
- List of artists who reached number one on the U.S. Rhythmic chart
