= Truth Tour =

2004 concert tour by Usher

- Tour by Usher
- Promotional poster for the tour
- Associated album: Confessions
- Start date: May 21, 2004
- End date: October 15, 2004
- Legs: 3
- No. of shows: 72
- Supporting act: Kanye West

Usher concert chronology
- 8701 Evolution Tour (2002); Truth Tour (2004); One Night Stand: Ladies Only (2008)

The Truth Tour was the second concert tour by American recording artist Usher. Visiting Africa, North America and Europe, the tour accompanies his fourth studio album, Confessions. The tour commenced on May 21, 2004, in Johannesburg and concluded on October 15, 2004, in Hartford. It was ranked as one of the highest-grossing tours of 2004 in North America, grossing $29.1 million.

== Background ==
This was Raymond's second tour. He stated to the Daily Press: "before I get ready to put my shows together, I always go to New York. I go to Vegas. I go to Atlantic City, and I sit down at the shows, and I get some inspiration from there", Usher said. He also looks at tapes of old "Soul Train" TV shows to get ideas for choreography. Raymond enlisted stylist Tameka Foster to create his wardrobe for the tour.

== Concert synopsis ==
The tour set featured a small stage up on top of the main stage, where the band played. Usher was occupied by his eight supporting dancers. Attached to the smaller stage was a mini platform which lowered to the main stage attached by two big staircases on both sides of it. To the left, a group of circular staircases climbed to the top, and to the right, there was a fire escape replete with steps and an elevator. Usher's entrance was a short movie showing him getting dressed and walking to the concert venue, following on with him performing the opening song "Caught Up", with Usher dressed in all white while wearing an all-white glove.

The second song performed was "You Make Me Wanna...", where two dancers stayed on the top stage with Usher while two male dancers came out to the lower level with two chairs each in their hands. Each dancer threw one chair up to the top, with Usher already in hand with his own chair, following a set dance routine from the video. Following this, Usher performed "U Remind Me", where he danced by himself during a breakdown of the track doing his signature handstand that makes the initials "UR".

Next he performed "My Way" dressed in the attire from his video doing similar routines after the song begun a dance break where Usher and his dancer began breakdancing. He changed wardrobe and appears on the small stage wearing a black dress shirt, black fedora a and white studded pants singing "Follow Me". This leads "That's What It's Made For", before he goes into his next song he shows gratitude to his audience. He begins singing excerpts from "Superstar" with the help of his background singers while on top of the small stage. He walks over to the circular staircase where his mic stand is and he begins singing "Nice & Slow". The mini platform lifts him in the sky as he begins to sing "U Got it Bad". Next he introduces his eight dancers into him singing "U Don't Have to Call".

Just Blaze playing tour DJ appears on the top platform plays the next song "Throwback" that he produced. Usher walks out in Michael Vick's Atlanta Falcons jersey to sing his verse, Rico Loves joins him on stage rapping his verse. Following on with the song "Bad Girl", where Usher was dressed up in a lavender suit and came out in a chrome chair. During the song, Usher picked out a female from the crowd, transitioning to "Superstar", singing to the fan. Usher continued singing to the fan, performing "Can U Handle It?", closing the song by kissing the fan who then left the stage. A video interlude played then Usher came out sitting in a chair performing with Confessions then Kanye West joins him rap his verse from Confessions Remix. Completing another wardrobe chain he comes out in his signature outfit an Atlanta Braves fitted cap, Blazer, and Jeans singing "Burn". He finishes his performance doing the hit single "Yeah!".

== Broadcasts and recordings ==
The concert was recorded on October 2 and 3, 2004 at Philips Arena in Atlanta, GA. Showtime broadcast the show during a special titled One Night, One Star: Usher Live at Coliseo de Puerto Rico. Raymond during this concert special brought out special guests Lil Jon, Ludacris, Daddy Yankee, Fat Joe, and Beyoncé to perform a dance routine to "Bad Girl" choreographed by Frank Gatson, Jr.

On September 16, 2005, the DVD of The Truth Tour: Behind The Tour was certified 7× Platinum by RIAA.

== Personnel ==
- Musical director: Valdez Brantley
- Drums: Aaron Spears
- Guitars: Juan "Johnny" Najera
- Keyboards/MD: Arthur "Buddy" Strong
- Background vocalist: Sy Smith, Di Reed, BJ Sledge, Brandon Rodgers, Ryon Lovett

== Opening acts ==
- JoJo (Europe, select dates)
- Kanye West (North America)
- Christina Milian (North America, select dates)
- Cassidy (United Kingdom)

== Setlist ==
The following setlist was obtained from the concert held on August 5, 2004, at the Hampton Coliseum in Hampton, Virginia. It does not represent all concerts for the duration of the tour.

1. "Video Sequence"
2. "Caught Up"
3. "You Make Me Wanna..."
4. "U Remind Me"
5. "My Way"
6. "Follow Me"
7. "That's What It's Made For"
8. "Nice & Slow"
9. "U Got It Bad"
10. "Video Sequence"
11. "U Don't Have to Call"
12. "Throwback"
13. "Bad Girl"
14. "Can U Handle It?"
15. "Superstar"
16. "Do It to Me"
17. "Confessions (Interlude)" / "Confessions Part II"

Encore

18. "Video Sequence"
19. "Burn"
20. "Yeah!"

== Tour dates ==
Date	City	Country	Venue
Africa
May 21, 2004	Johannesburg	South Africa	The Dome at Northgate
May 23, 2004	Cape Town	South Africa	Bellville Velodrome
May 25, 2004	Durban	South Africa	ICC Arena
May 27, 2004	Johannesburg	South Africa	The Dome at Northgate
Europe
June 4, 2004	Stuttgart	Germany	Hanns-Martin-Schleyer-Halle
June 5, 2004	Oberhausen	Germany	König Pilsener Arena
June 6, 2004	Frankfurt	Germany	Festhalle Frankfurt
June 8, 2004	Copenhagen	Denmark	Forum Copenhagen
June 9, 2004	Stockholm	Sweden	Stockholm Globe Arena
June 11, 2004	Bremen	Germany	Stadthalle Bremen
June 12, 2004	Hamburg	Germany	Color Line Arena
June 13, 2004	Berlin	Germany	Velodrom
June 14, 2004	Munich	Germany	Kulturhalle Zenith
June 16, 2004	Marseille	France	Le Dôme de Marseille
June 17, 2004	Münchenstein	Switzerland	St. Jakobshalle
June 19, 2004	Forest	Belgium	Forest National
June 20, 2004	Paris	France	Palais Omnisports de Paris-Bercy
June 21, 2004	Rotterdam	Netherlands	Rotterdam Ahoy Sportpaleis
June 23, 2004	Manchester	England	Manchester Evening News Arena
June 24, 2004	London	England	Wembley Arena
June 25, 2004	London	England	Wembley Arena
June 28, 2004	London	England	Wembley Arena
June 30, 2004	Manchester	England	Manchester Evening News Arena
July 1, 2004	Birmingham	England	NEC Arena
July 2, 2004	Glasgow	Scotland	SECC Concert Hall 4
July 3, 2004	Dublin	Ireland	Point Theatre
July 5, 2004	Lyon	France	Halle Tony Garnier
July 6, 2004	Lille	France	Zénith de Lille
July 7, 2004	Nottingham	England	Nottingham Arena
July 8, 2004	London	England	Wembley Arena
July 9, 2004	London	England	Wembley Arena
North America
August 5, 2004	Hampton	United States	Hampton Coliseum
August 6, 2004	Baltimore	United States	1st Mariner Arena
August 7, 2004	Raleigh	United States	RBC Center
August 9, 2004	Toronto	Canada	Air Canada Centre
August 10, 2004	Cleveland	United States	CSU Convocation Center
August 12, 2004	Dallas	United States	American Airlines Center
August 13, 2004	Houston	United States	Toyota Center
August 14, 2004	New Orleans	United States	New Orleans Arena
August 17, 2004	Cincinnati	United States	U.S. Bank Arena
August 19, 2004	Philadelphia	United States	Wachovia Center
August 20, 2004	Washington, D.C.	United States	MCI Center
August 21, 2004	East Rutherford	United States	Continental Airlines Arena
August 22, 2004	Boston	United States	FleetCenter
August 25, 2004	Columbus	United States	Value City Arena
August 30, 2004	Los Angeles	United States	Staples Center
August 31, 2004	Glendale	United States	Glendale Arena
September 2, 2004	Los Angeles	United States	Staples Center
September 3, 2004	Oakland	United States	The Arena in Oakland
September 4, 2004	Oakland	United States	The Arena in Oakland
September 5, 2004	Las Vegas	United States	Mandalay Bay Events Center
September 9, 2004	Minneapolis	United States	Target Center
September 10, 2004	Rosemont	United States	Allstate Arena
September 11, 2004	Auburn Hills	United States	The Palace of Auburn Hills
September 12, 2004	Milwaukee	United States	Bradley Center
September 17, 2004	Memphis	United States	FedExForum
September 18, 2004	St. Louis	United States	Savvis Center
September 19, 2004	Kansas City	United States	Kemper Arena
September 23, 2004	Miami	United States	American Airlines Arena
September 24, 2004	Tampa	United States	St. Pete Times Forum
September 25, 2004	Jacksonville	United States	Jacksonville Veterans Memorial Arena
September 28, 2004	Tallahassee	United States	Tallahassee-Leon County Civic Center
September 30, 2004	Charlotte	United States	Charlotte Coliseum
October 1, 2004	Greenville	United States	BI-LO Center
October 2, 2004	Birmingham	United States	BJCC Arena
October 3, 2004	Atlanta	United States	Philips Arena
October 6, 2004	Pittsburgh	United States	Mellon Arena
October 7, 2004	Philadelphia	United States	Wachovia Center
October 9, 2004	Greensboro	United States	Greensboro Coliseum
October 12, 2004	Albany	United States	Pepsi Arena
October 13, 2004	New York City	United States	Madison Square Garden
October 14, 2004	New York City	United States	Madison Square Garden
October 15, 2004	Hartford	United States	Hartford Civic Center

Cancellations and rescheduled shows

June 6, 2004	Frankfurt, Germany	Jahrhunderthalle	Moved to the Festhalle Frankfurt
June 8, 2004	London, England	Wembley Arena	Rescheduled to June 28, 2004
June 9, 2004	Copenhagen, Denmark	Valby-Hallen	Rescheduled to June 8, 2004, and moved to the Forum Copenhagen
June 23, 2004	Grenoble, France	Summum	Cancelled
June 24, 2004	Lille, France	Zénith de Lille	Rescheduled to July 6, 2004
June 26, 2004	Dublin, Ireland	Point Theatre	Rescheduled to July 3, 2004
August 14, 2004	Columbus, Ohio	Value City Arena	Rescheduled to August 25, 2004
August 25, 2004	New Orleans, Louisiana	Louisiana Superdome	Rescheduled to August 14, 2004, and moved to the New Orleans Arena
August 26, 2004	Houston, Texas	Toyota Center	Rescheduled to August 13, 2004
August 31, 2004	Oakland, California	The Arena in Oakland	Rescheduled to September 4, 2004
September 15, 2004	Dallas, Texas	American Airlines Arena	Rescheduled to August 12, 2004
October 6, 2004	New York City, New York	Madison Square Garden	Rescheduled to October 13, 2004
October 7, 2004	New York City, New York	Madison Square Garden	Rescheduled to October 14, 2004
October 7, 2004	Hartford, Connecticut	Hartford Civic Center	Rescheduled to October 15, 2004

=== Box office score data ===
Venue	City	Tickets sold / Available	Gross revenue
1st Mariner Arena	Baltimore	11,061 / 11,061 (100%)	$584,657
RBC Center	Raleigh	13,272 / 13,272 (100%)	$583,238
Air Canada Centre	Toronto	14,678 / 14,678 (100%)	$1,007,323
CSU Convocation Center	Cleveland	10,092 / 10,092 (100%)	$510,753
American Airlines Center	Dallas	12,374 / 12,374 (100%)	$653,882
Toyota Center	Houston	11,950 / 11,950 (100%)	$695,100
New Orleans Arena	New Orleans	13,498 / 13,498 (100%)	$734,708
U.S. Bank Arena	Cincinnati	10,413 / 10,413 (100%)	$521,382
Wachovia Center	Philadelphia	24,837 / 24,837 (100%)	$1,572,338
MCI Center	Washington, D.C.	13,271 / 13,271 (100%)	$883,562
Continental Airlines Arena	East Rutherford	14,383 / 14,383 (100%)	$918,219
FleetCenter	Boston	13,870 / 13,870 (100%)	$870,305
Value City Arena	Columbus	9,986 / 9,986 (100%)	$521,625
Staples Center	Los Angeles	27,831 / 27,831 (100%)	$1,633,339
Glendale Arena	Glendale	11,671 / 11,671 (100%)	$638,135
The Arena in Oakland	Oakland	23,474 / 23,474 (100%)	$1,293,184
Mandalay Bay Events Center	Las Vegas	9,232 / 9,232 (100%)	$711,328
Target Center	Minneapolis	12,317 / 12,317 (100%)	$645,493
Allstate Arena	Rosemont	12,818 / 12,818 (100%)	$746,564
The Palace of Auburn Hills	Auburn Hills	15,226 / 15,226 (100%)	$900,727
Bradley Center	Milwaukee	10,334 / 10,334 (100%)	$594,763
FedExForum	Memphis	12,725 / 12,725 (100%)	$660,255
Savvis Center	St. Louis	11,724 / 11,724 (100%)	$673,086
Kemper Arena	Kansas City	13,447 / 13,447 (100%)	$700,303
American Airlines Arena	Miami	12,203 / 12,203 (100%)	$697,882
St. Pete Times Forum	Tampa	11,184 / 11,184 (100%)	$637,280
Jacksonville Veterans Memorial Arena	Jacksonville	10,450 / 10,450 (100%)	$614,287
Charlotte Coliseum	Charlotte	10,082 / 10,082 (100%)	$417,336
Pepsi Arena	Albany	10,133 / 10,133 (100%)	$520,590
Madison Square Garden	New York City	26,658 / 26,658 (100%)	$2,026,698
Hartford Civic Center	Hartford	10,192 / 10,192 (100%)	$618,297
TOTAL		425,386 / 425,386 (100%)	$24,786,639
