= My Girl, My Girl =

Single by Warren Stacey
- Released: 11 March 2002
- Genre: R&B
- Label: Def Soul

"My Girl, My Girl" is the debut single by British R&B singer Warren Stacey. It was released by Def Soul on 11 March 2002, and peaked at number 26 on the UK Singles Chart. Stacey was signed to Def Soul after appearing on Popstars, the reality programme that created the pop groups Hear'Say and Liberty X. Within weeks of his elimination from the show, Stacey was signed as a solo artist by Def Jam Recordings, who flew him to Los Angeles to write and record "My Girl My Girl" with production team Red Zone. The single was favourably compared to those of fellow British R&B singer, Craig David.

== Chart performance ==
Chart (2002)	Peak position
UK Singles (OCC)	26
