= List of former Def Jam Recordings artists =

This is a list of former artists who have recorded for Def Jam Recordings, organized alphabetically by last name.

Listed in parentheses are names of Def Jam affiliated labels, under which the artist recorded.

== # ==
- 10k.Caash
- 3rd Bass

== A ==
- Amerie
- Amil (Roc-A-Fella/Def Jam)
- Andre Bowen (Def Jam/Columbia)
- Arlissa
- Ashanti (The Inc./Def Jam)
- Asher Roth
- August Alsina
- Aztek Escobar (Roc La Familia/Def Jam)

== B ==
- Babyface
- Bamby H2O
- Beastie Boys
- Beanie Sigel (Roc-A-Fella/State Property/Def Jam)
- Beau Young Prince
- Bernard Jabs
- Bibi Bourelly
- Big Boi
- Big K.R.I.T. (Cinematic/Def Jam)
- Billz
- B.G. Knocc Out & Dresta (Outburst/Def Jam)
- BLENDA (Star Trak/Def Jam)
- Bobby Valentino (Disturbing Tha Peace/Def Jam)
- Bone
- Bo$$
- The Braxtons

== C ==
- Calvin Jeremy (Def Jam Jakarta)
- Cam'ron (Diplomat/Roc-A-Fella/Def Jam)
- Capleton
- Capone
- Capone-N-Noreaga
- Case
- Charli Baltimore (The Inc./Def Jam)
- Chingy (Disturbing tha Peace/Def Jam)
- CKY (Island Records/Def Jam)
- Common (ARTium/Def Jam)
- Comp
- Corey Franks (Def Soul)
- Cormega
- Cosha TG (Mosley Music Group/Def Jam)
- CyHi the Prynce (GOOD/Def Jam)

== D ==
- Da 5 Footaz (G-Funk Music/Def Jam)
- Davy DMX
- Dee The Mad Bitch & DJ King Assassin
- Def Squad
- Desiigner (GOOD/Def Jam)
- The Diplomats (Roc-A-Fella/Def Jam)
- diveliner
- DJ Clue? (Roc-A-Fella/Desert Storm/Def Jam)
- Domino (Outburst/Def Jam)
- Dominic Lord
- The Don
- Downtown Science
- The Dove Shack (G-Funk Music/Def Jam)
- Dru Hill (Def Soul/Def Jam)
- De'Troof
- De'Michael Donta Berkins (Roc-A-Fella/Def Jam)

Donny Darko (Sicc-Minded/Def Jam)

== E ==
- Ed Harlem
- EPMD
- Erick Sermon

== F ==
- Corey Franks (Def Soul)
- Fam-Lay (Star Trak/Def Jam)
- Fetty Luciano
- Flatlinerz
- Foxy Brown (Roc-A-Fella/Def Jam)
- Frank Ocean
- Freeway (Roc-A-Fella/Def Jam)
- Funkmaster Flex
- Flesh-N-Bone (Mo Thug/Def Jam)
- FYA

== G ==
- Grafh (Roc-A-Fella/Dame Dash Music Group/Def Jam)
- Ghostface Killah (Starks Enterprises/Def Jam)
- GUN40
- Gunplay (MMG/Def Jam)
- GWH (The Inc./Def Jam)

== H ==
- Headless Horsemen
- Héctor el Father (Roc La Familia/Gold Star Music/Machete Music/VI Music)
- Hollis Crew
- Honeyz (Mercury/Def Jam)
- Hose
- Hostyle
- HXLT (GOOD/Def Jam)

== I ==
- The Isley Brothers (Def Soul/Def Jam)

== J ==
- Ja Rule (Def Jam/Murder Inc.)
- Jay-Z (Roc-A-Fella/Def Jam)
- Jayo Felony
- Jazzy Jay
- Jimmy Spicer
- Joe Budden
- Jonell (Def Soul/Def Jam)
- Juelz Santana

== K ==
- K. Roosevelt
- Kacy Hill (GOOD/Def Jam)
- Kaleb Mitchell
- Keith Murray
- Kelly Price (Def Soul/Def Jam)

== L ==
- Lady Luck (rapper)
- Lady Sovereign (Def Jam/Island Records)
- Landstrip Chip
- Lil Durk
- Lil Ru
- LL Cool J
- Logic
- LovHer (Dragon/Def Soul/Def Jam)
- Lul G

== M ==
- M.O.P. (Roc-A-Fella/Def Jam)
- Mak Sauce (Run-It-Up/Def Jam)
- Mariah Carey
- Masio Gunz
- MC Serch
- Memphis Bleek (Roc-A-Fella/Get Low/Def Jam)
- Method Man
- Method Man & Redman
- Christina Milian (Def Soul/Def Jam)
- MoKenStef (Outburst/Def Jam)
- Montell Jordan
- Motier Arina (Def Jam) (deceased)
- Musiq (Def Soul)

== N ==
- N.O.R.E. (Thugged Out/Roc La Familia/Def Jam)
- N-Dubz
- NASAAN
- Ne-Yo (Compound/Def Jam)
- Neef Buck (Roc-A-Fella/Def Jam)
- Nefew (Bases Loaded/Def Jam)
- Nikki D
- Nimic Revenue
- Nova Rockefeller

== O ==
- Onyx (Chaos/JMJ/Def Jam)
- Oran "Juice" Jones (OBR/Def Jam)
- Original Concept

== P ==
- Patti LaBelle (Def Soul/Def Jam)
- Payroll Giovanni & Cardo
- Peedi Peedi (Roc-A-Fella/Def Jam)
- Playa (Def Soul/Def Jam)
- Kelly Price (Def Soul/Def Jam)
- Prime Minister Pete Nice & Daddy Rich
- Public Enemy
- Pvrx

== R ==
- Redman
- Rell (Roc-A-Fella/Def Jam; Dame Dash Music Group/Def Jam)
- Richie Rich
- Rick Ross (Slip-N-Slide/Def Jam; Maybach/Def Jam)
- RJ Payne
- Megan Rochell
- Ron Isley (Def Soul/Def Jam)
- Rihanna
- Richie Sambora

== S ==
- Saukrates
- S3nsi Molly & Lil Brook
- Shawnna (Disturbing tha Peace/Def Jam)
- Serius Jones (Disturbing tha Peace/Def Jam)
- State Property (Roc-A-Fella/State Property/Def Jam)
- Shyne (Gangland/Def Jam)
- Sisqó (Dragon/Def Soul/Def Jam)
- Sizzla (Dame Dash Music Group/Def Jam)
- Slayer
- Slick Rick
- SM*SH (Ancora Music/Def Jam)
- Sneakk
- South Central Cartel
- Static Major (Blackground/Def Jam)
- Steph Jones (Disturbing Tha Peace/Def Jam)

== T ==
- T La Rock
- Teairra Mari (Roc-A-Fella/Def Jam)
- Teriyaki Boyz (BAPE/Def Jam, USA/Japan)
- TJ Porter
- Trap Beckham
- Trinidad James
- Troi Irons (Circa 13/Def Jam)
- Tru Life (Roc La Familia/Roc-A-Fella/Def Jam)
- Twinz

== U ==
- Uncle Murda (Manhood/GMG/Roc-A-Fella/Def Jam)
- Hikaru Utada

== W ==
- Terri Walker (Def Soul/Def Jam)
- Warren G (Violator/Def Jam)
- Warren Stacey
- WC
- Alyson Williams
- Nicole Wray (Roc-A-Fella/Def Jam, Dame Dash Music Group/Def Jam)
- WAX

== Y ==
- YFL Kelvin
- Young Chris (Roc-A-Fella/Def Jam)
- Young Gunz (Roc-A-Fella/Def Jam)
- Yung Chase (100/Def Jam)
- Yung Tory (Mosley Music Group/Def Jam)
