= This Must Be Love =

This Must Be Love may refer to:

- This Must Be Love (album), an album by The 88
- "This Must Be Love" (song), a 2007 song by Little Man Tate
- "This Must Be Love", a 1990 song by Loïs Lane
- "This Must Be Love", a 1981 song by Phil Collins from the album Face Value

== See also ==
- It Must Be Love (disambiguation)
