= Smujji =

British reggae/dancehall singer

- Origin: United Kingdom
- Genres: Dancehall, reggae fusion
- Occupation: Singer
- Instrument: Vocals
- Years active: 2003–present
- Label: Jamdown

Smujji is a British reggae/dancehall singer.

He appeared on FYA's 2004 single "Must Be Love" which was a No. 13 hit on the UK Singles Chart. His own single, "K.O.", reached No. 43 in the UK. Together with FYA, he appeared as part of Bliss magazine's 2004 Rock and Shop tour. He was also a support act for American musician Usher in the Truth Tour.

Smujji's debut album, True Colours was released in 2005 on Jamdown UK and Reservoir Records (Japan). A solo version of "Must Be Love" by Smujji appears on the album.

== Discography ==
=== Albums ===
- True Colours (2005), Jamdown/Reservoir
- Ghetto Silk (2007), Jamdown
- Ultimate Smujji (compilation) (2013), Jamdown

=== Singles ===
- 2004: "Must Be Love" (with FYA) – UK No. 13
- 2004: "K.O." – UK No. 43
- 2005: "Waiting for a Girl Like You"
- 2006: "Let Yourself Go"
- 2006: "Hol 'Em High" (with Busy Signal)
- 2007: "Take It Off" (with Ce'cile)
