= Faya (duo) =

UK musical group

- Also known as: FYA
- Origin: Slough, England
- Genres: Reggae fusion, R&B, dancehall, pop
- Years active: 2003–present
- Labels: Def Jam, Jamdown, Toshiba EMI
- Members: Tenza Foster; Emma Nhamburo
- Past members: Kezia (Kizzy) Bennett
- Website: www.lukemileycreative.com

Faya (/ˈfaɪjə/, formerly spelled FYA) are a female R&B duo from West London. Originally a trio, the group was founded in Slough, England, and were signed to a six-album deal with Def Jam Recordings in 2003. They are best known for their 2004 single "Must Be Love", which featured guest vocals from Smujji and peaked at number 13 on the UK Singles Chart. This was followed by a second single, "Too Hot", and an album, For Your Attention, which was certified gold in Japan.

== History ==
FYA (standing for "For Your Attention") originally had three members: Kezia (Kizzy) Bennett, Tenza Foster and Emma Nhamburo. Nhamburo, originally from Harare in Zimbabwe, and Foster, who originated from Montego Bay in Jamaica, met Bennett and formed FYA in Slough. They were discovered performing at a Slough youth centre and released their debut single, "Boops '03"—a cover of "Boops (Here to Go)" by Sly and Robbie—in November 2003.

"Must Be Love"
FYA's single "Must Be Love", taken from For Your Attention, featured Foster rapping and vocals from guest singer Smujji.

After the release of "Boops '03", FYA were signed to a six-album deal with Def Jam Recordings. This was followed by a second single, "Must Be Love", which was released in March 2004. The strength of this single allowed FYA to be featured alongside acts such as Franz Ferdinand and Natasha Bedingfield as part of a BBC Radio 1 series on new British music. "Must Be Love" featured vocals from guest singer Smujji and peaked at No. 13 on the UK Singles Chart, making it FYA's biggest chart hit. It sold 100,000 copies worldwide and was licensed to more than fifteen countries.

Following the success of "Must Be Love", FYA released a third single, "Too Hot", in July 2004. The song did not sell as well as "Must Be Love", and peaked at No. 49 on the UK Singles Chart. The band were subsequently dropped by Def Jam, and instead released their debut album, For Your Attention, through the label Jamdown in 2005. For Your Attention was also released in Japan by Toshiba EMI, where it reached gold certification. A second album, Feel the Heat, was released by Universal Music in 2007, with the track "Season on Fire" being taken from it as a single. After Bennett left the group, Foster and Nhamburo continued to perform together under the name Faya, and are currently based in West London.

== Discography ==
=== Studio albums ===
Year	Album details
2005	For Your Attention: Released: 11 April 2005; Label: Jamdown; Format: CD
2007	Feel the Heat: Released: 2007; Label: Universal Music; Format: Digital download
2011	Ready Back Again: Released: 2011; Format: Digital download

=== Singles ===
Year	Title	Chart peak positions	Album
Year	Title	UK	Album
2003	"Boops '03"	—	Non-album release
2004	"Must Be Love" (featuring Smujji)	13	For Your Attention
2004	"Too Hot"	49	For Your Attention
2007	"Season on Fire"	—	Feel the Heat
"—" denotes a release that did not chart.

== See also ==
- List of former Def Jam Recordings artists
