= It Must Be Love =

It Must Be Love may refer to:

- "It Must Be Love" (Labi Siffre song), a 1971 song by Labi Siffre, later covered by Madness
- "It Must Be Love" (Don Williams song), a 1979 song by Don Williams, later covered by Alan Jackson
- "It Must Be Love", a 1979 song by Alton McClain and Destiny
- "It Must Be Love" (Ty Herndon song), a 1998 song by Ty Herndon
- It Must Be Love (1926 film), a 1926 American silent film, directed by Alfred E. Green
- It Must Be Love (2004 film), a 2004 television film starring Ted Danson
- It Must Be Love, Love, Love, part three of the 2011 limited series Butcher, Baker, Candlestickmaker by Garth Ennis and Darick Robertson

== See also ==
- This Must Be Love (disambiguation)
