= You Make Me Wanna... =

1997 single by Usher

- Standard release

Single by Usher

from the album My Way
- Released: August 5, 1997
- Recorded: 1996
- Studio: Krosswire (Atlanta, Georgia)
- Genre: R&B; soul; pop
- Length: 3:39; 5:20 (extended version)
- Label: LaFace; Arista
- Songwriters: Usher Raymond; Jermaine Mauldin; Manuel Seal
- Producer: Jermaine Dupri

Usher singles chronology
| "The Many Ways" (1995) | "You Make Me Wanna..." (1997) | "Nice & Slow" (1998) |

Music video
- "You Make Me Wanna..." on YouTube

"You Make Me Wanna..." is a song by American singer Usher. The song was released on August 5, 1997, by LaFace Records and Arista Records as the lead single from his second studio album, My Way (1997). He and Manuel Seal wrote the song with its producer Jermaine Dupri. An R&B, soul and pop song in C minor, it makes use of acoustic guitar, hi-hat and bell instrumentation. The lyrics focus on a love triangle relationship, with the protagonist wishing to leave his girlfriend for his erstwhile best friend, with a hook in which Usher states, "You make me wanna leave the one I'm with and start a new relationship with you". "You Make Me Wanna..." won a Billboard Music Award, a Soul Train Music Award, and a WQHT Hip Hop Award, and was nominated for a Grammy Award.

The song charted at number one in the United Kingdom along with the top 10 in Australia, Croatia, Ireland, the Netherlands, Spain, and the United States as well as the top 20 in Canada, France, Germany, New Zealand, Norway, Scotland, and Switzerland. An accompanying music video, directed by Bille Woodruff, shows Usher dancing in various colored rooms and backgrounds, and uses an effect which creates several clones of Usher.

== Production and composition ==
"You Make Me Wanna..."
The song makes heavy use of the acoustic guitar.

Usher wrote "You Make Me Wanna..." with Jermaine Dupri and Manuel Seal, who also produced and played musical instruments on the tune. Phil Tan was in charge of recording the song at the Krosswire Studio, in Atlanta, Georgia in 1996. Tan and Dupri mixed the record with assistance from John and Brian Frye at Studio LaCoCo, in Atlanta, Georgia. "You Make Me Wanna..." draws from the genres of R&B, soul and pop, and heavily utilizes the acoustic guitar, while also incorporating hi-hat and bell instrumentation. According to Universal Music Publishing Group's sheet music published at Musicnotes.com, "You Make Me Wanna..." is written in the key of C Minor with a moderate tempo of 88 beats per minute. Usher's voice extends from the low note of B♭_{3} to the high note of C_{6}. The song has a basic sequence of Cm–Fm_{7}–A♭–G–G/B as its chord progression. "You Make Me Wanna" is about a love triangle where a man is torn between his current relationship and his feelings for a close friend. He realizes that he wants to leave his current partner for this friend, as they have a deeper emotional connection. The song explores themes of desire, temptation, and confusion in relationships.

== Release ==
"You Make Me Wanna..." was distributed by LaFace Records and Arista Records. In the United States, it was serviced to rhythmic contemporary radio on July 15, 1997. The song was then released as a maxi single on August 5, 1997. On September 9, 1997, the track was added to US contemporary hit radio. "You Make Me Wanna..." was released via cassette single, CD single, and 12-inch vinyl in the UK on January 19, 1998. The vinyl was made available in the US on April 24, 2001. Unauthorized copies of the song were distributed in Europe before its release, due to its popularity. "You Make Me Wanna..." serves as the opening track to Usher's second studio album, My Way, while an extended version concludes the album.

== Critical reception ==
BBC Music's Christian Hopwood stated that "You Make Me Wanna..." had "universal appeal". Larry Flick from Billboard wrote, "Vocally strumming his notes as gently and powerfully as the guitar player who accompanies him, Usher makes no enemies by professing an attraction to a friend while being involved with another. The track promises to be a hit among all generations and genders as his loyal young female fan base will eagerly jump aboard. Older women will easily fall prey to the very thought of his musings, while men now have an interesting avenue to express similar feelings." Robert Christgau noted "You Make Me Wanna..." as one of the best tracks from My Way. Entertainment Weekly's Whitney Pastorek gave it an A− rating, and complimented its minimal production. The Daily News reviewer called the single "very wonderful". British Music Week gave the single five out of five, remarking that it "looks set to crash into the mainstream". The magazine's Alan Jones praised it as "a superbly sublime and soulful semi-acoustic debut which recalls similarly styled singles from Tony Rich and Babyface. It actually has a very complex vocal, with Usher singing in and around the gaps on his own chorus. A very promising cuitain-raiser." According to Ann Powers of The New York Times, the song "put the spice back in the word 'relationship'." David Fricke from Rolling Stone said it is one thing: "tiptoe love funk with a spare, gangsta air and Usher doing overdubbed ensemble singing like a one-man Blackstreet." When reviewing My Way, Ian Hyland from Sunday Mirror stated that, "Tracks like 'You Make Me Wanna...', 'Nice And Slow' and 'Slow Jam' should put you in the mood". A writer for The Vindicator wrote, "The song is a melodic blend of Usher's smooth, youthful voice and a strong, upbeat rhythm track. Billy Johnson Jr. of Yahoo! Music commended the production on "You Make Me Wanna...", along with that of "Nice and Slow" and "My Way", the second and third singles from My Way, respectively. On Valentine's Day 2004, VH1 listed the song at number six on its "Top 10 Sexy Tunes" for the holiday.

"You Make Me Wanna..." won Usher the Billboard award for Pop Singer of the Year, and the Best R&B/Soul Single, Male category at the 1998 Soul Train Music Awards. Radio station WQHT awarded it the title of Best R&B Song at its inaugural Hip Hop Awards. The singer also received a Grammy Award nomination for Best Male R&B Vocal Performance for the song at the 40th Grammy Awards, but lost to R. Kelly's "I Believe I Can Fly". In the 1997 Pazz & Jop critics' poll administered by The Village Voice, "You Make Me Wanna..." tied for thirtieth place in the singles category with Radiohead's "Paranoid Android".

== Commercial performance ==
"You Make Me Wanna..." debuted at number twenty-five on the Billboard Hot 100 on the chart dated August 23, 1997. The track peaked at number two for seven consecutive weeks, from October 25 to December 6, 1997. After seven weeks at number two, the song fell into number three, replaced at the runner-up spot by LeAnn Rimes' "How Do I Live", which had also spent seven weeks at number three. In November 1998, the song fell off the chart after forty-six charting weeks. On the Hot R&B Singles component chart, "You Make Me Wanna..." debuted at number four on August 23, 1997, before topping the chart two weeks later. In its first week of release, "You Make Me Wanna..." received 1,329 spins, and by early October 1997, the song had made fifty million listener impressions on US R&B radio. The record spent a total of eleven weeks atop the Hot R&B Singles chart and seventy-one weeks within the chart's 100 positions. "You Make Me Wanna..." stood as the song with the longest run on the genre chart by a male artist until K'Jon's "On the Ocean" lasted longer in 2010. It also spent twenty-nine weeks on the Mainstream Top 40 chart, peaking at number seven. On September 3, 1997, "You Make Me Wanna..." received a gold certification from the Recording Industry Association of America (RIAA), denoting 500,000 shipments, and later that month it was upgraded to platinum status for shipments exceeding one million copies. Though its certification status was not further renewed, it ultimately went on to sell over two million copies domestically. The song ranked at number eighty-eight on the Billboard Hot 100 "All-Time Top Songs", published in July 2008.

"You Make Me Wanna..." entered the UK singles chart at number one, on the chart dated January 31, 1998. That same week the British Phonographic Industry (BPI) awarded the song a silver certification for shipping 200,000 units. It only spent one week on top of the chart, being replaced by Aqua's "Doctor Jones". "You Make Me Wanna..." slipped off the chart in May 1998, having had thirteen charting weeks. The BPI has since re-certified the single platinum for sales of over 600,000 units. The song entered the Canadian RPM 100 Hit Tracks chart at number eighty-six on November 10, 1997. It peaked at number 17, lasting twenty-two weeks in the chart. In Europe, the song reached the top twenty in France, Germany, Norway and Switzerland, and peaked at number seven in the Netherlands. It spent sixteen weeks in the Australian Singles Chart, climaxing at number six, and was certified Platinum by the Australian Recording Industry Association (ARIA), having sold 70,000 copies. "You Make Me Wanna..." reached number fifteen on the New Zealand Singles Chart, occupying twenty-six weeks in the chart. Recorded Music NZ certified the song double platinum, denoting sales of 60,000 units.

== Music video ==
The accompanying music video for "You Make Me Wanna..." was directed by Bille Woodruff. It starts with Usher sitting in an orange wall recess, reaching for a guitar, before cutting to a scene of him standing in a white-and-purple circular room, wearing an open shirt. It moves to a blue backdrop where Usher advances, flanked by four dancers. The scene is replaced by five clones of Usher dancing and sitting on chairs. The video continues with the singer performing dance routines throughout; interspersed are scenes of Usher singing the song on a background of blue pipes. Toward the end of the video, he takes off his shirt in the circular room, and finally Usher and his backup dancers step out of their shoes and walk away.

== Track listings ==
- Maxi-single
1. "You Make Me Wanna..." – 3:39
2. "You Make Me Wanna..." (JD remix) – 3:39
3. "You Make Me Wanna..." (Lil' Jon's Eastside Remix) – 3:58
4. "You Make Me Wanna..." (Timbaland Remix) – 4:26
5. "You Make Me Wanna..." (instrumental) – 3:17
6. "You Make Me Wanna..." (Lil Jon's Eastside remix instrumental) – 3:57
- CD single
1. "You Make Me Wanna..."
2. "You Make Me Wanna..." (Tuff Jam Classic Garage Mix)
3. "You Make Me Wanna..." (Tuff Jam Classic Garage instrumental)
4. "You Make Me Wanna..." (Tuff Jam UVM Dub Mix)
5. "You Make Me Wanna..." (instrumental Dub Mix)
- 12-inch vinyl
1. "You Make Me Wanna..." – 3:39
2. "You Make Me Wanna..." (JD's Remix) – 3:39
3. "You Make Me Wanna..." (Lil' Jon's Eastside Remix) – 3:58
4. "You Make Me Wanna..." (Timbaland Remix) – 4:26
5. "You Make Me Wanna..." (a cappella) – 3:39
6. "You Make Me Wanna..." (instrumental) – 3:17

== Charts ==
=== Weekly charts ===
Weekly chart performance for "You Make Me Wanna..."
| Chart (1997–1998) | Peak position |
|---|---|
| Australia (ARIA) | 6 |
| Belgium (Ultratop 50 Flanders) | 42 |
| Belgium (Ultratop 50 Wallonia) | 30 |
| Canada (Nielsen SoundScan) | 6 |
| Canada Top Singles (RPM) | 17 |
| Canada Dance/Urban (RPM) | 1 |
| Croatia (HRT) | 10 |
| Europe (Eurochart Hot 100) | 8 |
| France (SNEP) | 20 |
| Germany (GfK) | 18 |
| Ireland (IRMA) | 9 |
| Netherlands (Dutch Top 40) | 7 |
| Netherlands (Single Top 100) | 6 |
| New Zealand (Recorded Music NZ) | 15 |
| Norway (VG-lista) | 12 |
| Scottish Singles Sales (Official Charts) | 13 |
| Spain (AFYVE) | 10 |
| Sweden (Sverigetopplistan) | 24 |
| Switzerland (Schweizer Hitparade) | 12 |
| UK Singles (Official Charts) | 1 |
| UK Dance (Official Charts) | 17 |
| UK Hip Hop/R&B (Official Charts) | 1 |
| US Billboard Hot 100 | 2 |
| US Dance Singles Sales (Billboard) | 1 |
| US Hot R&B/Hip-Hop Songs (Billboard) | 1 |
| US Pop Airplay (Billboard) | 7 |
| US Rhythmic Airplay (Billboard) | 1 |

=== Year-end charts ===
1997 year-end chart performance for "You Make Me Wanna..."
| Chart (1997) | Position |
|---|---|
| Netherlands (Dutch Top 40) | 61 |
| Netherlands (Single Top 100) | 43 |
| UK Urban (Music Week) | 10 |
| US Billboard Hot 100 | 14 |
| US Hot R&B Singles (Billboard) | 5 |

1998 year-end chart performance for "You Make Me Wanna..."
| Chart (1998) | Position |
|---|---|
| Australia (ARIA) | 47 |
| Canada Top Singles (RPM) | 37 |
| Canada Urban (RPM) | 46 |
| Europe (Eurochart Hot 100) | 70 |
| Germany (Media Control) | 100 |
| Netherlands (Single Top 100) | 95 |
| UK Singles (OCC) | 42 |
| UK Urban (Music Week) | 6 |
| US Billboard Hot 100 | 15 |
| US Hot R&B Singles (Billboard) | 15 |
| US Mainstream Top 40 (Billboard) | 24 |
| US Rhythmic Top 40 (Billboard) | 8 |

=== Decade-end charts ===
Decade-end chart performance for "You Make Me Wanna..."
| Chart (1990–1999) | Position |
|---|---|
| US Billboard Hot 100 | 45 |

=== All-time charts ===
All-time chart performance for "You Make Me Wanna..."
| Chart (1958–2018) | Position |
|---|---|
| US Billboard Hot 100 | 114 |

== Certifications ==
Certifications and sales for "You Make Me Wanna..."
| Region | Certification | Certified units/sales |
|---|---|---|
| Australia (ARIA) | Platinum | 70,000^{‡} |
| New Zealand (RMNZ) Physical sales | Gold | 5,000^{*} |
| New Zealand (RMNZ) Digital sales + streaming | 2× Platinum | 60,000^{‡} |
| United Kingdom (BPI) | Platinum | 600,000^{‡} |
| United States (RIAA) | 3× Platinum | 3,000,000^{‡} |
^{*} Sales figures based on certification alone.^{‡} Sales+streaming figures based on certification alone.

== See also ==
- List of number-one singles from the 1990s (UK)
- List of number-one R&B singles of 1997 (U.S.)
- List of Billboard Rhythmic number-one songs of the 1990s
- List of RPM number-one dance singles of 1997
