= My Way (Usher song) =

1998 single by Usher

- One of U.S. editions

Single by Usher

from the album My Way
- Released: May 18, 1998
- Length: 3:34
- Label: LaFace; Arista
- Songwriters: Usher Raymond; Jermaine Mauldin; Manuel Seal
- Producers: Jermaine Dupri; Manuel Seal

Usher singles chronology
| "The Party Continues" (1998) | "My Way" (1998) | "Bedtime" (1999) |

Music video
- "My Way" on YouTube

"My Way" is a song by American singer Usher, released by LaFace and Arista Records on May 18, 1998, as the third single from his second album, My Way (1997). The song was written by Usher alongside its producers Manuel Seal and Jermaine Dupri, the latter of whom provides an uncredited guest appearance and backing vocals.

== Release and reception ==
Despite moderate airplay, the single sold well and reached number two on the U.S. Billboard Hot 100. Due to the disappointment of the "Nice & Slow" single in the United Kingdom, "My Way" was not released as a single there. In 2016, Complex ranked "My Way" number ten on their list of the 25 greatest Usher songs, and in 2021, American Songwriter ranked the song number two on their list of the 10 greatest Usher songs.

== Music video ==
It was filmed and released in 1998 at a broken down garage in a desert location. It features a dance competition between two groups, one led by Usher and the other led by Tyrese Gibson. The video features style elements heavily influenced by Stanley Kubrick's film, A Clockwork Orange, with Usher and his dancers channeling the "droog" aesthetic through their wardrobe and makeup choices, such as Usher's bowler hat and eyeliner.

== Track listing ==
US 12-inch vinyl

1. "My Way" [Remix W/J.D.] 3:37 Rap [Featuring] - Jermaine Dupri
2. "My Way" [Remix Instrumental] 3:37
3. "My Way" [Remix Acappella] 3:37 Rap [Featuring] - Jermaine Dupri
4. "My Way" [Album Version] 3:38
5. "My Way" [Instrumental] 3:36
6. "My Way" [Acapella]

== Charts ==
=== Weekly charts ===
| Chart (1998) | Peak position |
|---|---|
| Australia (ARIA) | 48 |
| Germany (GfK) | 49 |
| Netherlands (Dutch Top 40) | 18 |
| Netherlands (Single Top 100) | 21 |
| New Zealand (Recorded Music NZ) | 17 |
| US Billboard Hot 100 | 2 |
| US Hot R&B/Hip-Hop Songs (Billboard) | 4 |
| US Rhythmic Airplay (Billboard) | 5 |

=== Year-end charts ===
| Chart (1998) | Position |
|---|---|
| UK Urban (Music Week) | 30 |
| US Billboard Hot 100 | 16 |
| US Hot R&B Singles (Billboard) | 29 |
| US Mainstream Top 40 (Billboard) | 70 |
| US Rhythmic Top 40 (Billboard) | 11 |

=== Decade-end charts ===
| Chart (1990–1999) | Position |
|---|---|
| US Billboard Hot 100 | 81 |

== Certifications ==
| Region | Certification | Certified units/sales |
|---|---|---|
| United States (RIAA) | Platinum | 1,400,000 |

== Release history ==
| Region | Date | Format(s) | Label(s) | Ref. |
|---|---|---|---|---|
| United States | April 13–14, 1998 | Urban radio | LaFace; Arista | |
| United States | April 28, 1998 | Rhythmic contemporary radio | LaFace; Arista | |
| Sweden | May 18, 1998 | CD | LaFace; Arista | |
| United States | June 9, 1998 | Contemporary hit radio | LaFace; Arista | |
| United States | June 9, 1998 | 12-inch vinyl; CD; cassette | LaFace; Arista | |
