= Nice & Slow =

1998 single by Usher

- Standard release

Single by Usher

from the album My Way
- Released: January 6, 1998
- Genre: R&B; soul
- Length: 3:48
- Label: LaFace; Arista
- Songwriters: Usher Raymond; Jermaine Mauldin; Manuel Seal; Brian Casey; Brandon Casey
- Producers: Jermaine Dupri; Manuel Seal

Usher singles chronology
"You Make Me Wanna..." (1997)	"Nice & Slow" (1998)	"The Party Continues" (1998)

Music video
- "Nice & Slow" on YouTube

"Nice & Slow" is a song from American singer Usher's second album, My Way (1997). Released on January 6, 1998, by LaFace and Arista, the song became Usher's first number-one single on the US Billboard Hot 100 chart in February 1998. The song was written by Usher, Brian Casey of the R&B group Jagged Edge, Manuel Seal, and Jermaine Dupri.

== Background and composition ==
"Nice & Slow" was written by Usher, Jermaine Dupri, Manuel Seal, and Brian Casey, with Dupri producing the tune and Seal serving as co-producer and responsible for the guitar work. Jagged Edge provided background vocals in the record. "Nice & Slow" was recorded by Phil Tan at the Somewhere in College Park studio in College Park, Georgia. Tan and Dupri mixed the record with assistance from John and Brian Frye at Studio LaCoCo, in Atlanta, Georgia. Dupri recalled telling Usher he needed a ballad to "knock out the world". The beat was created first, and the lyrics were fitted to it. The composition and recording of "Nice & Slow" took four hours, according to Dupri.

"Nice & Slow" is a slow R&B and soul ballad with hip hop influences. Musicologist Richard J. Ripani wrote that "Nice & Slow" is an example of the typical "R&B ballad style that became widely popular" in the late 1990s. According to the sheet music published at Musicnotes.com by Universal Music Publishing Group, "Nice & Slow" is written in common time with a slow tempo of sixty-eight beats per minute. Set in the key of A♭ major, it follows the basic chord progression of Fm_{11}–Cm_{7}–D♭maj_{13}–E♭_{9sus}. Usher's voice spans from the low note of E♭_{4} to the high note of A♭_{5}. "Nice & Slow" features a spoken introduction, while in the middle of the song Usher performs a melodic rap, which Billboard's Shawnee Smith compared to the style of Do or Die. Usher said to Time that "Nice & Slow" is "somewhat of an intimate story between a man and a woman."

== Release ==
"Nice & Slow" was released via CD single and cassette single in the United States on January 6, 1998. On February 3, 1998, it was serviced to US contemporary hit radio. A maxi single was released on March 2, 1998, and a remixes CD was made available on March 9, 1998. In the United Kingdom, "Nice & Slow" was issued as CD single, a 12-inch single, and a cassette single on April 20, 1998.

== Critical reception ==
A writer for the Daily News complimented the song as "warmly engaging". A writer for Jet praised Usher's "tender" vocals on the "sensuous ballad", stating that he displayed romance on the song. British magazine Music Week wrote, "More ultra-smooth R&B from the crown prince of hip-hop soul, "Nice & Slow" is a superbly mellow, seductive tune which has Usher showing off his unhurried rapping skills." In 2016, Complex ranked the song number seven on their list of the 25 greatest Usher songs, and in 2021, American Songwriter ranked the song number eight on their list of the 10 greatest Usher songs.

== Chart performance ==
"Nice & Slow" debuted at number nine on the Billboard Hot 100 on the chart dated January 24, 1998, as "You Make Me Wanna...", the first single from My Way slipped from number seven to number ten. On February 2, 1998, the Recording Industry Association of America (RIAA) awarded the song a gold certification, following up with a platinum one on February 12. "Nice & Slow" continued to ascend the Hot 100, reaching number one on February 14, succeeding "Together Again" by Janet Jackson. It remained atop the chart on February 21, but on February 28 it was replaced by Celine Dion's "My Heart Will Go On". On the UK Singles Chart, "Nice & Slow" reached number 24.

== Music video ==
The music video for the song was directed by Hype Williams and shot in Paris in February 1998. Kimora Lee Simmons plays Usher's love interest. The video opens with the caption "4:00 pm Paris" as Usher gets out of an airplane. He is shown shirtless in a hotel room having a telephone conversation with his love interest, consisting of the song's spoken intro. Usher and Simmons prepare for their date and meet each other before sightseeing around Paris in a convertible. Interspersed are low-angle shots of Usher dancing on a sidewalk. As the day becomes night, Usher is seen wearing sunglasses playing the guitar and dancing shirtless in front of the Eiffel Tower. Usher and Simmons drive across a bridge, and midway they are confronted by several gangsters, who kidnap and cage Simmons and beat Usher. Usher appeals to the police, who are apparently of no help, and proceeds to locate the gangsters' lair himself. He offers a briefcase to the gangsters, which explodes after being opened and a grenade starts to blow. Usher and the gangsters then engage in hand-to-hand combat. Usher and Simmons are together riding escape away on a motorbike as the windows of the building behind them explode. They are then seen relaxing on a sofa in triumphant before she saw a computer zoomed in, which features the song's title written over and over on a word processor. The music video on YouTube has received over 80 million views as of May 2024.

== Track listing ==
- US CD and cassette
1. "Nice & Slow"
2. "Nice & Slow" (instrumental)
- US 12-inch vinyl and CD-maxi
1. "Nice & Slow" (Live Mix)
2. "Nice & Slow" (B-Rock's Basement Mix)
3. "Nice & Slow"
4. "You Make Me Wanna..." (T & J Classic Garage Mix)
- UK CD1
1. "Nice & Slow"
2. "Nice & Slow" (CD-Rom Video Element)
3. "You Make Me Wanna..." / "Just Like Me" / "My Way" (Snippets)
- Remixes CD
1. "Nice & Slow" (Radio Version)
2. "Nice & Slow" (Live Version)
3. "Nice & Slow" (B-Rock's Basement Mix)
4. "Nice & Slow" (Suli & Stef's Club Class Mix – UK Mix)

== Charts ==
=== Weekly charts ===
Chart (1998)	Peak position
Australia (ARIA)	44
Canada (Nielsen SoundScan)	6
Canada Dance/Urban (RPM)	5
Europe (Eurochart Hot 100)	85
Netherlands (Dutch Top 40)	17
Netherlands (Single Top 100)	20
New Zealand (Recorded Music NZ)	7
Scottish Singles Sales (Official Charts)	54
Sweden (Sverigetopplistan)	59
UK Singles (Official Charts)	24
UK Hip Hop/R&B (Official Charts)	4
US Billboard Hot 100	1
US Dance Singles Sales (Billboard)	2
US Hot R&B/Hip-Hop Songs (Billboard)	1
US Rhythmic Airplay (Billboard)	1

=== Year-end charts ===
Chart (1998)	Position
New Zealand (RIANZ)	42
US Billboard Hot 100	9
US Hot R&B Singles (Billboard)	5
US Mainstream Top 40 (Billboard)	75
US Rhythmic Top 40 (Billboard)	5

=== Decade-end charts ===
Chart (1990–1999)	Position
US Billboard Hot 100	75

== Certifications ==
Region	Certification	Certified units/sales
New Zealand (RMNZ) Physical sales	Gold	5,000^{*}
New Zealand (RMNZ) Digital sales + streaming	Platinum	30,000^{‡}
United Kingdom (BPI)	Silver	200,000^{‡}
United States (RIAA)	3× Platinum	1,500,000
^{*} Sales figures based on certification alone.^{‡} Sales+streaming figures based on certification alone.

== See also ==
- List of Hot 100 number-one singles of 1998 (U.S.)
- List of number-one R&B singles of 1998 (U.S.)
