= Usher: Past Present Future =

2024–2025 concert tour by Usher

- Tour by Usher
- Promotional poster for the pre-sale of the tour
- Location: North America; Europe; UAE
- Associated album: Coming Home
- Start date: August 20, 2024
- End date: May 7, 2025
- No. of shows: 83
- Attendance: 1.1 million
- Box office: $186.5 million
- Website: www.usherworld.com

Usher concert chronology
- UR Experience Tour (2014–2015); Past Present Future (2024–2025); The R&B Tour (2026)

Usher: Past Present and Future was the sixth concert tour by American singer Usher. It was announced on February 6, 2024, in support of his ninth studio album, Coming Home (2024). The tour began on August 20, 2024 in Washington, D.C. and concluded on May 7, 2025 in London.

The tour announcement follows after his 100-show residencies at The Colosseum at Caesars Palace and Park MGM in Las Vegas that took place from 2021 and 2022–2023, respectively, as well as Usher headlining the Super Bowl LVIII halftime show at the Allegiant Stadium on February 11, 2024. The tour was met with an overwhelming demand expanding from the original 24 shows to 58, more than doubling the amount of shows that were previously announced.

== Background ==
In 2021, Usher embarked on his first ever concert residency, titled "Usher: Las Vegas Residency", at The Colosseum at Caesars Palace. The residency was met with critical acclaim and was praised by his fans. All 20 shows of the residency were sold out completely across July, August and December. Soon after the residency closed, Usher announced that he was starting a new Vegas residency in July 2022 at Park MGM titled, Usher: My Way - The Las Vegas Residency which helped celebrate the 25th anniversary of his album My Way. The residency sold out consistently throughout its run and was extended several times until December 2023 to meet the popular demand. With both residencies, Usher did a total of 100 shows in Las Vegas, becoming one of the most critically-acclaimed Vegas residencies of all-time.

== Set list ==
This set list was taken from the show in Washington, D.C. on August 20, 2024. It does not represent all shows throughout the tour.

1. "Coming Home"
2. "Hey Daddy (Daddy's Home)"
3. "Big"
4. "Call Me a Mack"
5. "Think of You"
6. "Can U Get wit It"
7. "My Way"
8. "You Make Me Wanna...
9. "8701 Interlude"
10. "U Remind Me"
11. "U Don't Have to Call"
12. "Caught Up"
13. "Don't Waste My Time"
14. "Love in This Club"
15. "Tell Me"
16. "Say What U Want"
17. "New Flame"
18. "Margiela"
19. "Party"
20. "Lil Freak"
21. "Lovers and Friends"
22. "Nice & Slow"
23. "U Got It Bad"
24. "Climax"
25. "Burn"
26. "Confessions Part II"
27. "Monstar"
28. "Euphoria"
29. "OMG"
30. "DJ Got Us Fallin' in Love"
31. "Without You"
32. "Superstar"
33. "There Goes My Baby"
34. "I Need a Girl"
35. "Invented Sex (Remix)"
36. "Trading Places"
37. "The Matrimony
38. "Good Love"
39. "I Don't Mind"
40. "Throwback"
41. "Bad Girl"
42. "Good Kisser"
43. "Ruin"
44. "Peace Sign"
45. "Seduction"
46. "Good Good"
47. "Yeah!"

== Tour dates ==
List of 2024 concerts - North America
Date (2024)	City	Country	Venue	Attendance	Revenue
August 20	Washington, D.C.	United States	Capital One Arena	30,797 / 30,797	$4,911,633
August 21	Washington, D.C.	United States	Capital One Arena	30,797 / 30,797	$4,911,633
August 23	Baltimore	United States	CFG Bank Arena	23,131 / 23,131	$4,530,074
August 24	Baltimore	United States	CFG Bank Arena	23,131 / 23,131	$4,530,074
August 27	Boston	United States	TD Garden	24,990 / 24,990	$3,835,941
August 28	Boston	United States	TD Garden	24,990 / 24,990	$3,835,941
August 30	Philadelphia	United States	Wells Fargo Center	28,863 / 28,863	$4,629,531
August 31	Philadelphia	United States	Wells Fargo Center	28,863 / 28,863	$4,629,531
September 2	Toronto	Canada	Scotiabank Arena	28,299 / 28,299	$3,330,741
September 3	Toronto	Canada	Scotiabank Arena	28,299 / 28,299	$3,330,741
September 6	New York City	United States	Barclays Center	58,041 / 58,041	$10,735,488
September 7	New York City	United States	Barclays Center	58,041 / 58,041	$10,735,488
September 9	New York City	United States	Barclays Center	58,041 / 58,041	$10,735,488
September 10	New York City	United States	Barclays Center	58,041 / 58,041	$10,735,488
September 12	Detroit	United States	Little Caesars Arena	28,931 / 28,931	$4,653,683
September 13	Detroit	United States	Little Caesars Arena	28,931 / 28,931	$4,653,683
September 17	Denver	United States	Ball Arena	25,669 / 25,669	$4,259,636
September 18	Denver	United States	Ball Arena	25,669 / 25,669	$4,259,636
September 21	Inglewood	United States	Intuit Dome	44,981 / 44,981	$8,306,290
September 22	Inglewood	United States	Intuit Dome	44,981 / 44,981	$8,306,290
September 24	Inglewood	United States	Intuit Dome	44,981 / 44,981	$8,306,290
September 25	Inglewood	United States	Intuit Dome	44,981 / 44,981	$8,306,290
September 28	Oakland	United States	Oakland Arena	27,037 / 27,037	$4,740,903
September 29	Oakland	United States	Oakland Arena	27,037 / 27,037	$4,740,903
October 3	Dallas	United States	American Airlines Center	40,688 / 40,688	$9,275,570
October 4	Dallas	United States	American Airlines Center	40,688 / 40,688	$9,275,570
October 5	Dallas	United States	American Airlines Center	40,688 / 40,688	$9,275,570
October 7	Austin	United States	Moody Center	21,490 / 21,490	$4,570,005
October 8	Austin	United States	Moody Center	21,490 / 21,490	$4,570,005
October 17	Atlanta	United States	State Farm Arena	34,504 / 34,504	$6,657,505
October 18	Atlanta	United States	State Farm Arena	34,504 / 34,504	$6,657,505
October 20	Atlanta	United States	State Farm Arena	34,504 / 34,504	$6,657,505
October 22	Charlotte	United States	Spectrum Center	28,821 / 28,821	$4,425,915
October 23	Charlotte	United States	Spectrum Center	28,821 / 28,821	$4,425,915
October 25	St. Louis	United States	Enterprise Center	27,263 / 27,263	$4,351,053
October 26	St. Louis	United States	Enterprise Center	27,263 / 27,263	$4,351,053
October 28	Chicago	United States	United Center	44,217 / 44,217	$7,305,354
October 29	Chicago	United States	United Center	44,217 / 44,217	$7,305,354
October 31	Chicago	United States	United Center	44,217 / 44,217	$7,305,354
November 2	Minneapolis	United States	Target Center	21,541 / 21,541	$3,487,621
November 3	Minneapolis	United States	Target Center	21,541 / 21,541	$3,487,621
November 7	Vancouver	Canada	Rogers Arena	27,166 / 27,166	$3,293,557
November 8	Vancouver	Canada	Rogers Arena	27,166 / 27,166	$3,293,557
November 10	Seattle	United States	Climate Pledge Arena	27,257 / 27,257	$4,721,100
November 11	Seattle	United States	Climate Pledge Arena	27,257 / 27,257	$4,721,100
November 15	Paradise	United States	T-Mobile Arena	29,208 / 29,208	$4,766,515
November 16	Paradise	United States	T-Mobile Arena	29,208 / 29,208	$4,766,515
November 18	Anaheim	United States	Honda Center	24,721 / 24,721	$4,567,193
November 19	Anaheim	United States	Honda Center	24,721 / 24,721	$4,567,193
November 23	Phoenix	United States	Footprint Center	23,135 / 23,135	$4,684,687
November 24	Phoenix	United States	Footprint Center	23,135 / 23,135	$4,684,687
November 27	Houston	United States	Toyota Center	37,829 / 37,829	$6,727,193
November 29	Houston	United States	Toyota Center	37,829 / 37,829	$6,727,193
November 30	Houston	United States	Toyota Center	37,829 / 37,829	$6,727,193
December 5	New York City	United States	Barclays Center	26,655 / 26,655	$3,719,610
December 6	New York City	United States	Barclays Center	26,655 / 26,655	$3,719,610
December 9	Atlanta	United States	State Farm Arena	43,104 / 43,104	$7,261,802
December 10	Atlanta	United States	State Farm Arena	43,104 / 43,104	$7,261,802
December 12	Atlanta	United States	State Farm Arena	43,104 / 43,104	$7,261,802
December 16	Miami	United States	Kaseya Center	38,759 / 38,759	$9,083,772
December 18	Miami	United States	Kaseya Center	38,759 / 38,759	$9,083,772
December 19	Miami	United States	Kaseya Center	38,759 / 38,759	$9,083,772
Total				816,752 / 816,752	$142,885,299

List of 2025 concerts
Date (2025)	City	Country	Venue	Attendance	Revenue
March 29	London	England	The O_{2} Arena	130,618 / 130,618	$20,738,830
April 1	London	England	The O_{2} Arena	130,618 / 130,618	$20,738,830
April 2	London	England	The O_{2} Arena	130,618 / 130,618	$20,738,830
April 5	London	England	The O_{2} Arena	130,618 / 130,618	$20,738,830
April 6	London	England	The O_{2} Arena	130,618 / 130,618	$20,738,830
April 8	London	England	The O_{2} Arena	130,618 / 130,618	$20,738,830
April 9	London	England	The O_{2} Arena	130,618 / 130,618	$20,738,830
April 11	London	England	The O_{2} Arena	130,618 / 130,618	$20,738,830
April 15	Paris	France	Accor Arena	25,762 / 25,762	$3,469,573
April 16	Paris	France	Accor Arena	25,762 / 25,762	$3,469,573
April 19	Abu Dhabi	United Arab Emirates	Etihad Park	—	—
April 22	Amsterdam	Netherlands	Ziggo Dome	69,394 / 69,394	$9,275,561
April 23	Amsterdam	Netherlands	Ziggo Dome	69,394 / 69,394	$9,275,561
April 25	Amsterdam	Netherlands	Ziggo Dome	69,394 / 69,394	$9,275,561
April 26	Amsterdam	Netherlands	Ziggo Dome	69,394 / 69,394	$9,275,561
April 28	Amsterdam	Netherlands	Ziggo Dome	69,394 / 69,394	$9,275,561
May 1	Berlin	Germany	Uber Arena	36,738 / 36,738	$4,656,467
May 2	Berlin	Germany	Uber Arena	36,738 / 36,738	$4,656,467
May 4	Berlin	Germany	Uber Arena	36,738 / 36,738	$4,656,467
May 6	London	England	The O_{2} Arena	32,655 / 32,655	$5,170,741
May 7	London	England	The O_{2} Arena	32,655 / 32,655	$5,170,741
Total				295,157 / 295,157	$43,311,199

=== Cancelled Dates ===
On May 8, 2025, Usher announced the australian tour dates for the Past, Present, Future Tour. Initially announcing 4 dates in Melbourne and 4 dates in Sydney for fall 2025. Following demand, 2 more dates were added to each city. However, on July 4, 2025, the tour dates were cancelled.

==== Australian Tour Dates ====
Date (2025)	City	Country	Venue
November 19	Melbourne	Australia	Rod Laver Arena
November 20	Melbourne	Australia	Rod Laver Arena
November 22	Melbourne	Australia	Rod Laver Arena
November 23	Melbourne	Australia	Rod Laver Arena
November 25	Melbourne	Australia	Rod Laver Arena
November 26	Melbourne	Australia	Rod Laver Arena
December 1	Sydney	Australia	Qudos Bank Arena
December 2	Sydney	Australia	Qudos Bank Arena
December 4	Sydney	Australia	Qudos Bank Arena
December 5	Sydney	Australia	Qudos Bank Arena
December 10	Sydney	Australia	Qudos Bank Arena
December 11	Sydney	Australia	Qudos Bank Arena
