= Love the Way You Lie (Part II) =

2010 song by Rihanna featuring Eminem

Song by Rihanna featuring Eminem

from the album Loud
- Released: November 12, 2010
- Recorded: 2010
- Studio: Westlake Recording Studios (Los Angeles, California); Effigy Studios (Ferndale, Michigan)
- Genre: Pop; hip hop; R&B
- Length: 4:56; 4:12 (acoustic piano version)
- Label: Def Jam; SRP
- Songwriters: Alexander Grant; Holly Hafermann; Marshall Mathers
- Producers: Alex da Kid; Kuk Harrell

Audio video
- "Love The Way You Lie (Part II) (Pt. 2)" on YouTube

"Love the Way You Lie (Part II)" is a song by Barbadian singer Rihanna from her fifth studio album Loud (2010). It features American rapper Eminem, who wrote the song alongside Skylar Grey and the producer Alex da Kid. It is the sequel to the hit single "Love the Way You Lie", which appears on Eminem's seventh studio album Recovery. It received positive reviews from critics and was performed at the American Music Awards of 2010 on November 21, 2010, as part of a medley with "What's My Name?" and "Only Girl (In the World)".

== Background ==
Following the release and commercial success of "Love the Way You Lie" in 2010, Eminem wanted to record an alternative version with Rihanna as the lead vocalist, viewing aspects of a relationship from a female perspective, unlike the original, which featured Eminem as lead vocalist and was from a male perspective. In an interview for MTV, Rihanna initially stated she was against recording a sequel: "When I first heard the idea about doing a part two, I was just completely against it. I just felt like you couldn't beat the 'original'. There's no way you can outdo that, so why compete with it?". She said when she first heard the original demo of the song in the studio with Eminem, sung by American singer-songwriter Skylar Grey, her reservations about recording it went away. While the demo was only accompanied by a piano, Rihanna and her team added drums and later vocals from Eminem.

"Love the Way You Lie" and "Love the Way You Lie (Part II)" were based on a demo written and recorded in late 2009 by Grey. Grey said "I wrote the demo initially for myself because I thought, 'Oh, I have this big song, and now I have a little bit of a launching pad to put out my own stuff." Grey continued to discuss how the song was ultimately included on Loud, saying "As soon as Rihanna and her team heard my demo, they were like, 'Oh we want it for Rihanna's album,' so I had to make the decision if I was going to let them have it or not. But I did and so it was on Rihanna's album, too." The demo track by Grey, titled "Love the Way You Lie (Part III)", is on her extended play The Buried Sessions of Skylar Grey, which was released on January 17, 2012.

== Composition ==
"Love the Way You Lie (Part II)"
A 25-second sample of the piano version of "Love the Way You Lie (Part II)", which features Rihanna singing over a repetitive melody.

The piano and drums version, which features Eminem, appears as the final song on the standard edition of Loud, while the piano version, which excludes Eminem's part in the song, appears as a bonus track on the iTunes edition of Loud. "Love the Way You Lie (Part II)" is a mid-tempo song, which incorporates the musical genres of hip hop and R&B. According to sheet music published at Musicnotes, the song is written in common time with a moderate tempo of 83 beats per minute and is written in the key of G minor. Rihanna's vocal range in the song spans from the low note of F_{3} to the high note of D_{5}. Emily Mackay of NME commented about the vocals provided by Rihanna and Eminem in the song, stating that "There's great contrast in Part II of 'Love The Way You Lie'. With the balance of vocals neatly flipped and extra cavernous beats ramping up the drama, it wallows ever-deeper in the tortured relationship sketched out in Part I. Eminem at points is practically screaming with rage, and sounding, frankly, mental. The contrast with Rihanna's smoothly pitched pain ("Maybe I'm a masochist/Try to run but I don't wanna never leave") is delicious."

== Critical reception ==
Jon Pareles of The New York Times said that "Loud works the pop gizmos as neatly as any album this year, maintaining the Rihanna brand. But the album has a hermetic, cool calculation until it gets to 'Love the Way You Lie (Part II),' her take on the tortured hit she shared with Eminem. 'It's sick that all these battles are what keeps me satisfied,' she sings. A lone piano humanizes her first vocals, and she rides the ascending power ballad to a pained resolve; then Eminem delivers new verses in a spiraling rage. It's purely theatrical, but it's also, for a moment, raw." Christopher Richards of The Washington Post said that "With 'Love the Way You Lie (Part II),' the maniac-mouthed rapper is limited to just one verse, giving Rihanna the space to take ownership of the proceedings. Will the real Rihanna please stand up? She does -- and she sounds as remote as ever." James Skinner of BBC Online viewed 'Love the Way You Lie (Part II)' as being even better than the original. He said, "Eminem's verse exuding the kind of volatile, simmering menace that got everyone so excited about him in the first place. But it is Rihanna's vocal – at once commanding, soulful and vulnerable – that anchors the song, and Loud itself, elevating it from a hit-and-miss collection into something oddly arresting."

Steve Jones of USA Today gave a mixed review of the collaboration, commenting, "Eminem puts in a cameo on 'Love the Way You Lie (Part II)', which extends, but doesn't really add, to their earlier hit about a tortured relationship from his Recovery album." Chicago Sun-Times writer Thomas Conner gave a negative review of the song, stating, "She collaborated with Eminem this summer on the controversial 'Love the Way You Lie', a song and hotly debated video conflating wild passion with crazed assault. She returns to this on Loud with "Love the Way You Lie (Part II)", an extension of the melody and the arson metaphor, in which Eminem reappears with more histrionic rapping about hating her, loving her, hitting her and hugging her. It's an unnecessary sequel that further muddies the issue: Is this a social statement, or merely an artistic expression about some truly troubled and confused people."

== Chart performance ==
Both the original and the piano version of "Love the Way You Lie (Part II)" were not made available to purchase individually in the majority of iTunes stores, and could only be bought along with the iTunes edition of the album. However, the song may be purchased separately as part of the album INdependent omen Volume II. It debuted on Canadian Hot 100 for the week of December 4, 2010, at number 19 and stayed on the chart for eight weeks. In South Korea, it peaked at number four on the International Chart. The song also debuted and peaked at number 160 on the UK Singles Chart due to strong digital sales upon the release of Loud.

== Live performances ==
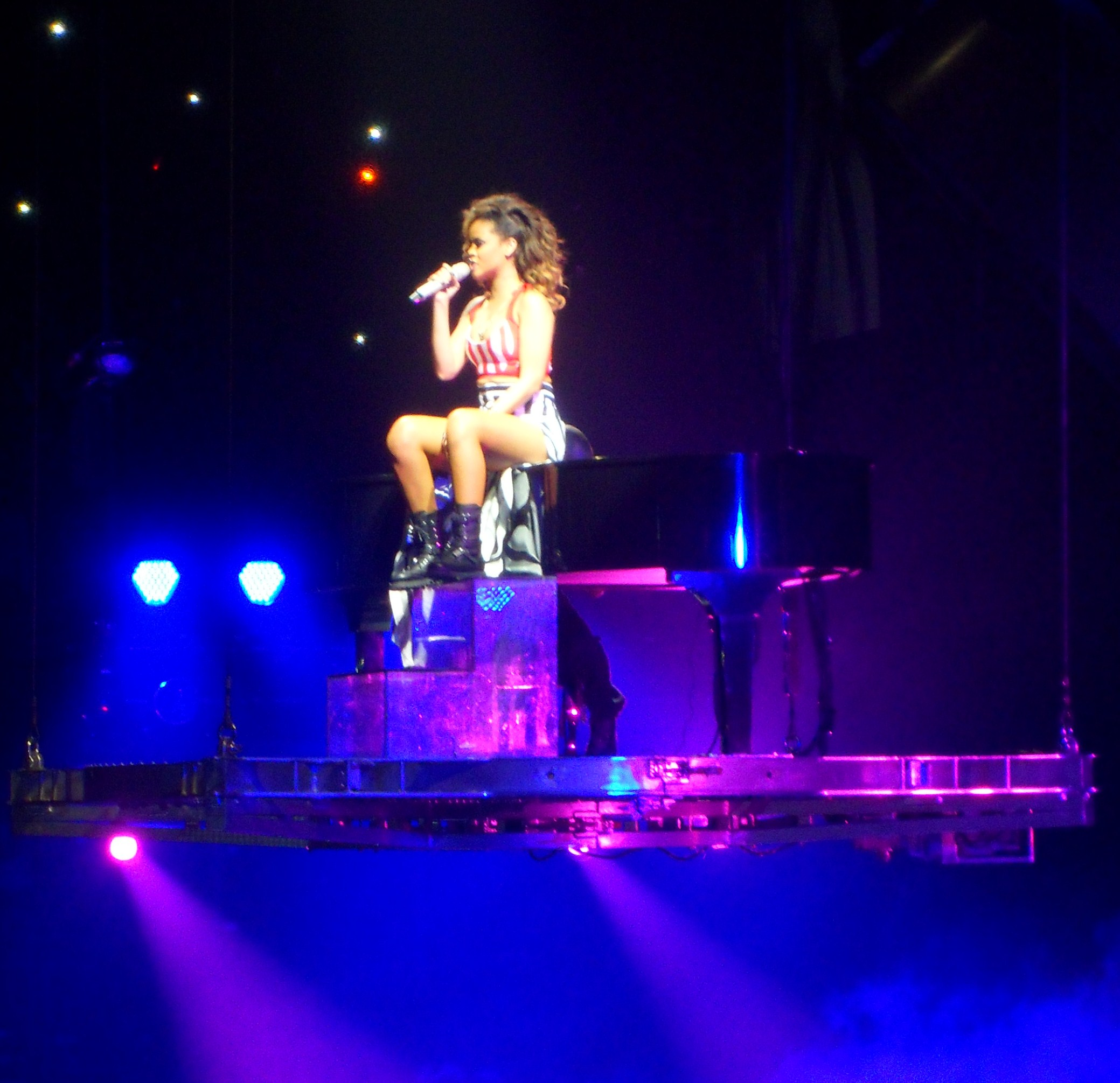
Rihanna performing "Love the Way You Lie Pt. II on the Loud Tour (2011) in Birmingham, England

Rihanna performed a shortened version of the song as part of a medley with "What's My Name?" and "Only Girl (In the World)" at the American Music Awards of 2010 on November 21, 2010. Rihanna opened the performance singing an acappella version of "Love The Way You Lie (Part II)". She was sitting on a stylized tree hovering above a field of sable-colored blades of grass. Once she had finished the first frame of the song, she plummeted from the tree to the ground.

Rihanna and Eminem performed the song together for the first time at the 53rd Annual Grammy Awards on February 13, 2011 as part of a medley with "I Need a Doctor" performed by Eminem, Dr. Dre, Skylar Grey and Adam Levine from Maroon 5, who provided background vocals. The performance started with Rihanna singing on a B-stage in the middle of the audience, accompanied by Adam Levine on the keys. Eminem then appeared on the main stage to perform his part of the song, whilst Rihanna made her way from the B-stage to join him. The song then transitioned into "I Need a Doctor", where Dr. Dre emerged to join up with Skylar Grey for her debut performance. The song is also included in the encore section of Rihanna's Loud Tour, along with "Umbrella". Rihanna performed "Love the Way You Lie (Part II)" at Radio 1's Hackney Weekend on May 24, 2012, as the eighth song on the set list.

== Credits and personnel ==
- Songwriting – Alexander Grant, Holly Hafermann, Marshall Mathers
- Production – Alex da Kid
- Recording – Alex da Kid
- Vocal production – Kuk Harrell
- Vocal recording – Kuk Harrell, Josh Gudwin, Marcos Tovar
- Assistant vocal recording – Bobby Campbell
- Vocal recording (Eminem) – Mike Strange
- Mixing – Manny Marroquin
- Assistant mixing – Erik Madrid and Christian Plata

Personnel adapted from the liner notes of Loud.

== Charts ==
Chart (2010)	Peak position
Canadian Hot 100 (Billboard)	19
South Korea International Chart (Gaon)	4
UK Singles (Official Charts Company)	160

== Certifications ==
Region	Certification	Certified units/sales
Australia (ARIA)	Platinum	70,000^{‡}
Brazil (Pro-Música Brasil)	Gold	30,000^{‡}
New Zealand (RMNZ)	Gold	15,000^{‡}
United Kingdom (BPI)	Gold	400,000^{‡}
United States (RIAA)	Gold	500,000^{‡}
^{‡} Sales+streaming figures based on certification alone.
