= Loud (Rihanna album) =

Studio album by Rihanna
- Released: November 12, 2010
- Recorded: February–August 2010
- Studios: The Bunker (Paris); Burst HQ (Milwaukee); Cahuenga Pass (Los Angeles); EastWest (Los Angeles); Effigy (Ferndale); Electric Lady (New York City); Glenwood Place (Burbank); The Hit Factory (Miami); Larrabee Sound (Los Angeles); No Excuses (Santa Monica); The Palms (Las Vegas); Platinum Sound (New York City); Roc the Mic (New York City); The Village Recorder (Los Angeles); We the Best (Miami); Westlake (Los Angeles)
- Genres: Dance-pop; R&B
- Length: 46:39
- Labels: SRP; Def Jam
- Producers: Alex da Kid; C. "Tricky" Stewart; Ester Dean; Mel & Mus; Polow da Don; The Runners; Sandy Vee; Sham; Soundz; Stargate; Willy Will

Rihanna chronology
Rated R: Remixed (2010)	Loud (2010)	Talk That Talk (2011)

Singles from Loud
- 1. "Only Girl (In the World)" Released: September 10, 2010; 2. "What's My Name?" Released: October 25, 2010; 3. "Raining Men" Released: December 7, 2010; 4. "S&M" Released: January 23, 2011; 5. "Man Down" Released: May 3, 2011; 6. "California King Bed" Released: May 13, 2011; 7. "Cheers (Drink to That)" Released: August 2, 2011

Loud is the fifth studio album by Barbadian singer Rihanna. It was released on November 12, 2010, by Def Jam Recordings and SRP Records. The album was recorded between February and August 2010, during the singer's Last Girl on Earth tour (2010–2011) and the filming of her first feature film Battleship (2012). Rihanna and L.A. Reid were the executive producers of Loud and worked with various record producers, including Stargate, Sandy Vee, The Runners, Tricky Stewart and Alex da Kid. The album features several guest vocalists, including rappers Drake, Nicki Minaj, and Eminem, who is featured on the sequel to "Love the Way You Lie", titled "Love the Way You Lie (Part II)".

Primarily a dance-pop and R&B record, Loud differs from Rihanna's previous effort, Rated R (2009), which incorporates a prominently foreboding and angry tone and dark themes. Loud features up-tempo songs, and marks the return of the bright, optimistic sound prominent on her first two albums Music of the Sun (2005) and A Girl Like Me (2006). It also uses rock in "California King Bed" and reggae in the Caribbean-inspired "Man Down".

Loud received positive reviews from music critics, who complimented its upbeat material and Rihanna's vocal performances, while others stated that although the songs were solid, they were unfocused to each other. The album was a commercial success; it debuted at number three on the US Billboard 200 chart, with sales of 207,000 copies, the highest first-week sales of her career at the time. The album peaked at number one on the Canadian, Swiss and the UK album charts. According to the International Federation of the Phonographic Industry (IFPI), Loud was the eighth global best-selling album of 2011. Since its release, it has sold over 8 million copies worldwide.

The album produced seven singles, including the international hits "Only Girl (In the World)", "What's My Name?", and "S&M". All three singles reached number one on the US Billboard Hot 100 chart. "S&M" was Rihanna's tenth number one song in the US, making Rihanna the youngest recording artist to accumulate the plateau in the shortest time, surpassing Mariah Carey. "Only Girl (In the World)" won the Grammy Award for Best Dance Recording in February 2011; additionally, the album was nominated for three more Grammy Awards, including for Album of the Year. To support the album, Rihanna embarked on her third worldwide concert tour, entitled the Loud Tour.

== Background ==
Following a domestic violence case between Rihanna and her boyfriend, the American entertainer Chris Brown, media speculated as to whether any song on her fourth studio album would be about him. The album was released in November 2009, under the title Rated R. Primarily a pop and R&B album, it also incorporates elements of hip hop, rock, and dancehall. Rated R was commercially successful and spawned six singles, including the international hit, "Rude Boy". Six months after releasing the record, Rihanna began planning a fifth studio album, promising that her new material would be "more energetic" than her previous works.

Stargate's Tor Erik Hermansen, said "Rihanna came to us before we started recording 'Only Girl (In the World)' and said 'I feel great about myself. I want to go back to having fun, I want to make happy and up-tempo records'." Sean Garrett compared the sound of the new tracks with her previous hit singles "Umbrella" and "Rude Boy". In an interview for MTV UK, the vice president of Def Jam Recordings compared the upcoming Rihanna album with Michael Jackson's Thriller saying, "Rihanna is coming along incredibly. I'm trying to push her to where every song will be a hit from one to 12. I'm talking about NO album fillers. Our bar for this album is Michael Jackson's Thriller."

== Recording and title ==
"I'm done recording the whole album. I made sure not to let you down with my music! You guys are always defending me, so now you've got some great songs to justify it. I didn't want to go backward and remake [2007's] Good Girl Gone Bad. I wanted the next step in the evolution of Rihanna, and it's perfect for us."

— Rihanna talking about the concept of Loud for Rihannadaily.com

Rihanna and Antonio "L.A." Reid assembled a group of songwriters and record producers at several recording studios in Los Angeles for two weeks to write songs for Rihanna; they wrote approximately 200 songs, eleven of which were included on the album. Def Jam rented out nearly every recording studio in Los Angeles in order to create as many songs as possible. Ray Daniels, the manager of musical duo Rock City (brothers Theron and Timothy Thomas), was present during the sessions, and stated that a writing camp typically involves the label hiring ten recording studios for two weeks at the cost of $25,000 per day. Daniels revealed that it is where songwriters have lyrics but no music, and where producers have music but no lyrics.

Singer-songwriters and producers Taio Cruz, Alex da Kid, Sean Garrett, Ne-Yo, Rico Love, Timbaland, Shontelle, David Guetta, and Drake contributed to the album. "DJ Got Us Fallin' in Love" was written for Rihanna, but the song was rejected and was subsequently sent to Usher. With regard to "What's My Name?", Rihanna thought Drake could understand the melody of the song and invited him to work on the track when she played him the finished recording. The collaboration was originally planned to be a remix, but later it was decided that the version featuring Drake would be used as the original.

Loud was recorded in various recording studios worldwide including the Larrabee Sound Studios, The Village and Westlake Recording Studios in Los Angeles, Platinum Sound Recording Studios, and Roc the Mic Studios in New York City and The Bunker Studios in Paris. In September 2010, during a webchat with her fansite Rihannadaily.com, Rihanna announced that the album would be called Loud, saying "get Loud everybody, get crazy, get excited, because I'm pumped. I'm just gonna be me because that's what you guys love the most, and that's what makes me feel best. Just being normal, normal for me is Loud! Sassy, fun, flirty, energetic." While Rihanna was filming Battleship, she explained in an interview with Entertainment Tonight, "Loud is, the word, the name of the album definitely reflects the attitude of it, it's really sassy and flirty and it grabs your attention and that's why I enjoy it. It takes you through a really really interesting ride. So colorful the album."

== Composition ==
=== Influence and sound ===
Loud is a departure from the personal, melodramatic themes of Rated R. Stylistically, it is a return to the Caribbean-inspired dance-pop of Rihanna's earlier work. Ryan Burleson of Consequence of Sound described the album as "a dynamic R&B and dance-pop record". In an interview with MTV, Rihanna said "I wanted songs that were all Rihanna songs, that nobody else could do. I didn't want the generic pop record that Ke$ha or Lady Gaga or Katy Perry could just do and it'll work. I wanted a song, or songs, that were Rihanna songs, that only I could do, had that little West Indian vibe to it, had that certain tone, a certain sass and a certain energy." During the promotion of Loud, Rihanna said that much of the music was born out of frustration. She explained: "When you go to a club and have to listen to bad music you revert to the liquor, because you want to have a good time. I hate having to skip a track. I wanted to make an album you can just play."

=== Songs ===
The opening track "S&M" is an up-tempo Eurodance song produced by Norwegian producers Stargate and Sandy Vee. The song is reminiscent of Depeche Mode's 1984 song "Master and Servant" and contains lyrical thoughts of sadomasochism. Andy Kellman of AllMusic regarded "S&M" as a dance-pop song which efficiently balanced "Rihanna's playful and sinister sides". "What's My Name?" was also produced by Stargate and features guest vocals from Canadian rapper Drake. It is a mid-tempo, electro-R&B song with a back track consisting of heavy reggae. The song also sees Rihanna's return to the "Island-pop" style of her early career". "Cheers (Drink to That)" is a pop rock song produced by the Runners which interpolates Avril Lavigne's 2002 single "I'm with You". Mark Savage from BBC News described the song as a funky, loping guitar groove for a night out on the town. "Only Girl (In the World)" was the third song from the album produced by Stargate. It is an up-tempo dance-pop song that incorporates elements of Eurodance in its production. Brad Wete, a reviewer of Entertainment Weekly, described Rihanna's vocals as "seductive" and reminiscent of a "stronger, sexier version" of her 2007 single, "Don't Stop the Music".

"California King Bed" is a rock power ballad; Ryan Dombell of Pitchfork compared it to the Aerosmith song, "I Don't Want to Miss a Thing". The Shama "SAK PASE" Joseph produced "Man Down" is a reggae song with an electro rhythm, in which Rihanna sings in a West Indian accent. "Raining Men" is a hip-hop song, which features rap vocals from rapper Nicki Minaj. Rihanna described the song as a fun song that differs from the original, referring to the 1979 single by the Weather Girls with similar title "It's Raining Men". "Complicated" was produced by Tricky Stewart and Ester Dean. Leah Greenblatt from Entertainment Weekly said "Even while telling a recalcitrant man how hard he is to love, she [Rihanna] sounds almost buoyant, her newly expanded vocals eager to scale the song's high-altitude house beat". The final track is the sequel to Rihanna's duet with Eminem, "Love the Way You Lie". "Love the Way You Lie (Part II)", which was produced by Alex da Kid, features Rihanna as the protagonist and lead vocalist, viewing aspects of a relationship from a female perspective, unlike the original, which featured Eminem as lead vocalist and was from a male perspective.

== Singles ==
"Only Girl (In the World)" was released as the album's lead single on September 10, 2010. The song was sent to US mainstream and rhythmic radio on September 21, 2010. It received positive reviews from music critics, who praised its chorus and thunderous dance beats. The song reached number one on the US Billboard Hot 100 chart, in the UK, Canada, Australia, Austria, Belgium (Wallonia), Ireland, Israel, Italy, New Zealand, Norway and Slovakia, becoming one of her best charting songs to date. At the 53rd Grammy Awards, held at the Staples Center in Los Angeles on February 13, 2011, "Only Girl (In the World)" won the award for Best Dance Recording.

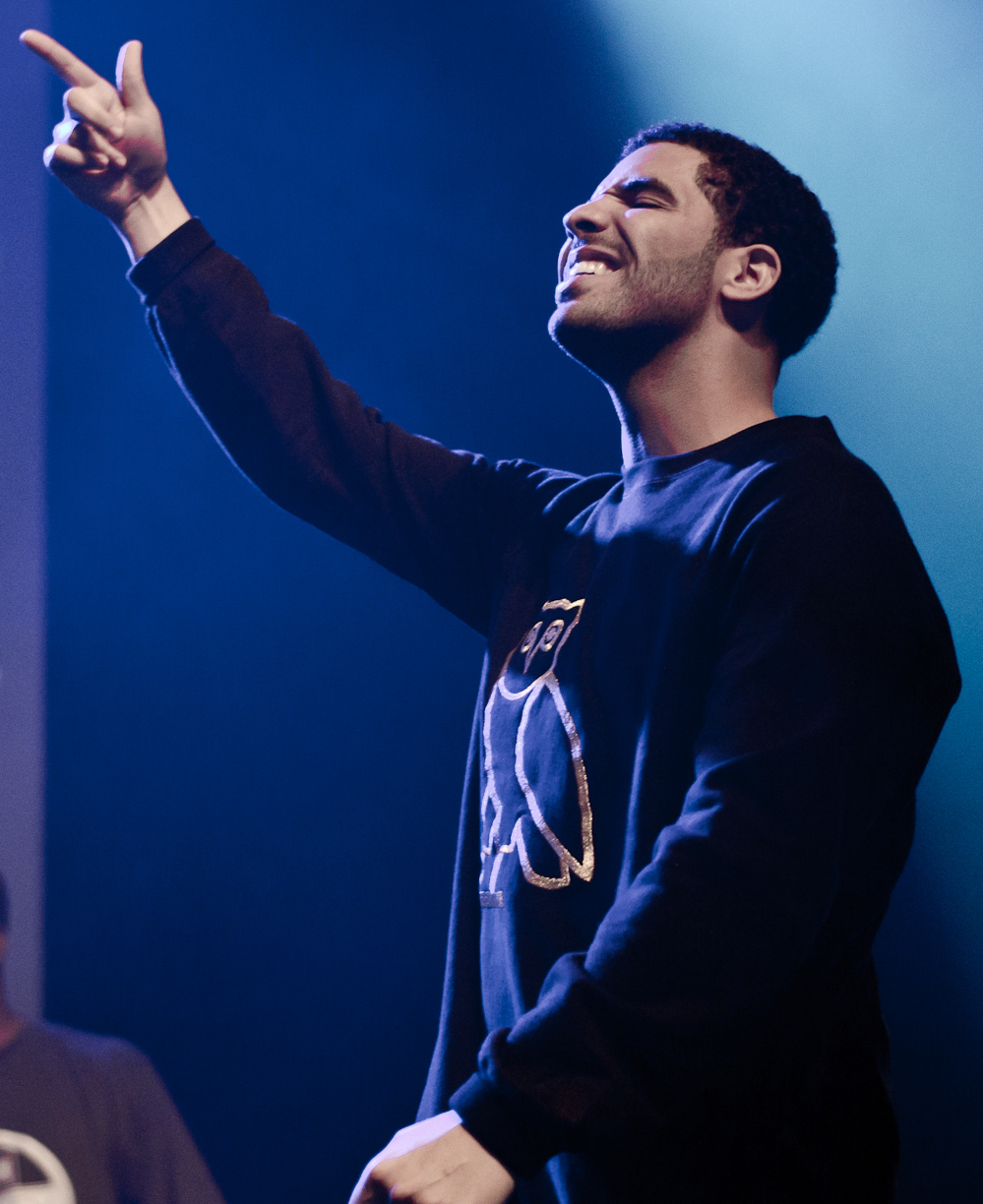
Canadian rapper Drake provided vocals on "What's My Name?".

"What's My Name?", which features guest vocals by Canadian recording artist Drake, was released as the album's second single; it was sent to US rhythmic radios on October 25, 2010. Music critics praised the song as some of Rihanna's best vocal work to date, noting the romantic nature of the song and its sexual tones. The song peaked at number one on the US Billboard Hot 100 chart, giving Rihanna her eighth number-one on the chart, while "Only Girl (In the World)" became her ninth number-one song two weeks after "What's My Name?". It reached number one in the United Kingdom and became Rihanna's fifth UK number one single and Drake's first.

"Raining Men", was sent to urban radio on December 7, 2010, as an urban radio single and third track from Loud as a single in the US. The song featured rapper Nicki Minaj. It peaked at number 48 on the US Billboard R&B/Hip-Hop Songs chart. "Raining Men" received mixed reviews from critics who praised the chemistry between Rihanna and Minaj but criticized the song for failing to create anything new or original.

"S&M", the album's fourth US single and third international single, was solicited to US mainstream radio on January 23, 2011. Reception of "S&M" was mixed; some reviewers criticized the overt use of sexual lyrics while others noted it as a stand-out track from Loud. A remix of the song which features guest vocals by Britney Spears, was digitally released on April 11, 2011. "S&M" reached the top ten in twenty-four countries and peaked at number one in Australia, Canada and the United States.

"Man Down" was released as the fifth international single in some European countries in July 2011. It received positive reviews from critics, who called it a return to Rihanna's Caribbean-tinged rhythm. "Man Down" reached a peak of 59 on the US Billboard Hot 100 chart. In France, it peaked at number one for five consecutive weeks.

"California King Bed" was released as the fourth international single on May 13, 2011, and as the sixth US single. It was sent to US Hot/Modern adult contemporary radio on May 16, 2011. The song peaked at number four in Australia and New Zealand and number eight on the UK Singles Chart.

"Cheers (Drink to That)" was announced by Rihanna as the seventh single from the album on July 24, 2011. The single was released to US mainstream and rhythmic radio on August 2, 2011. The song peaked at number seven on the US Billboard Hot 100, and number twelve on the US Pop Songs chart.

== Release and promotion ==
Loud was released on November 12, 2010, in four separate editions: a standard edition; a deluxe edition, packaged in a digipak exclusively for the US and Australia, that features a 30-minute documentary Making of Loud DVD (Directed by Brian and Brad Palmer); a Couture Edition containing the deluxe edition of Loud with a deluxe cover art lithograph, a box set with enhanced clear couture cover and a full-size photo book. An Ultra Couture Edition was also produced, containing a copy of the Deluxe Edition of Loud signed by Rihanna, the MP3 download of Loud on street date and all the features of the Couture Edition. The Ultra Couture Edition sold out and is no longer available neither on Amazon or her online store. An explicit version of Loud was also released and features a Parental Advisory label due to some of the lyrical content. The Japanese edition of the album was released with two additional remixes of "Only Girl (In the World)". The piano version of "Love the Way You Lie (Part II)" was only available with the iTunes edition of the album. However, the version which features Eminem was available for purchase.

=== Live performances ===
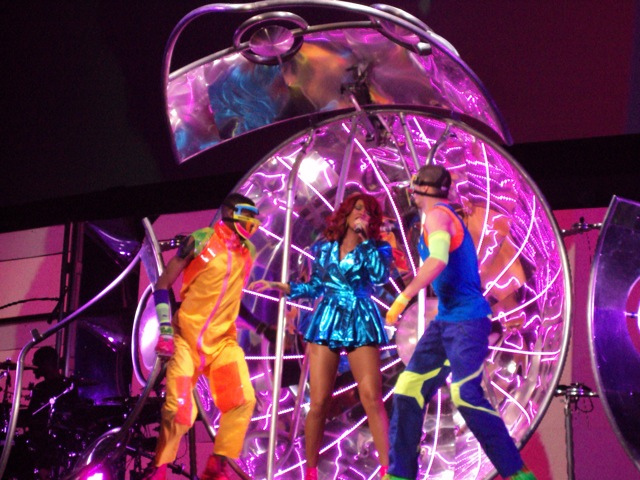
Rihanna performing "Only Girl (In the World)" on the Loud Tour

Rihanna embarked on a promotional tour across Europe and North America to promote the album's release. The singer performed "Only Girl (In the World)", the lead single, live for the first time in North America on Saturday Night Live on October 30, 2010, and debuted the second single, "What's My Name?", later on in the show. The following day in the United Kingdom, Rihanna sang "Only Girl (In the World)" on series seven of The X Factor. Rihanna performed "Only Girl (In the World)" at the 2010 MTV Europe Music Awards in Madrid, Spain, on November 7, 2010, on the X Factor in Italy on November 9, 2010, and on Le Grand Journal in France on November 10, 2010. On November 11, 2010, Rihanna appeared on a pre-recorded edition of The Graham Norton Show in the United Kingdom, where she gave an interview and sang "Only Girl (In the World)". On November 15, before the album's US release, Rihanna reprised her performance of "What's My Name?" for MTV's The Seven, live from Times Square, New York City. The next day, Rihanna performed "What's My Name?" on the Late Show with David Letterman. Rihanna performed a medley of "Love the Way You Lie (Part II)", "What's My Name?" and "Only Girl (In the World)" at the American Music Awards of 2010 on November 21, 2010, where she won the award for Favorite Soul/R&B Female Artist.

On December 11, 2010, Rihanna returned to series seven of the UK's The X Factor, to perform "Unfaithful" with finalist Matt Cardle, as well as a solo of "What's My Name?". The finale was watched by fifteen million viewers. Rihanna performed the song with Drake for the first time at the 53rd Annual Grammy Awards on February 13, 2011. Rihanna also appeared at the Brit Awards 2011 on February 15, 2011, where she performed "S&M" for the first time, as a medley with "Only Girl (In the World)" and "What's My Name?". Rihanna was requested to "tone down" her performance of "S&M" by the show's producers, and she performed only one verse and chorus in-between "Only Girl (In The World)" and "What's My Name?". Rihanna was a special guest at the NBA All-Star Game on February 20, 2011, where she performed a medley of "Umbrella", "Only Girl (In the World)", "Rude Boy", "What's My Name?" (with Drake) and "All of the Lights" (with Kanye West).

Rihanna performed "California King Bed" in the style of a country music song for the first time with Sugarland front woman Jennifer Nettles, during the ACM Awards held by the Academy of Country Music on April 3, 2011. She was a guest on the tenth season of the US series American Idol on April 14, 2011, where she performed "California King Bed". Rihanna promoted "California King Bed" with performances in Milan, Paris and Hamburg, because she was appointed ambassador for Nivea skincare. Rihanna opened the Billboard Music Awards on May 22, 2011, performing the remix of "S&M" with Britney Spears at the MGM Grand Garden Arena in Las Vegas. The performance attracted complaints about the overt sexual nature of the broadcast on a publicly owned television channel. Rihanna performed on NBC's Today show on May 27, 2011, as part of a Summer Concert Series. She performed "S&M", "Only Girl (In the World)", "What's My Name?" and "California King Bed".

=== Tour ===
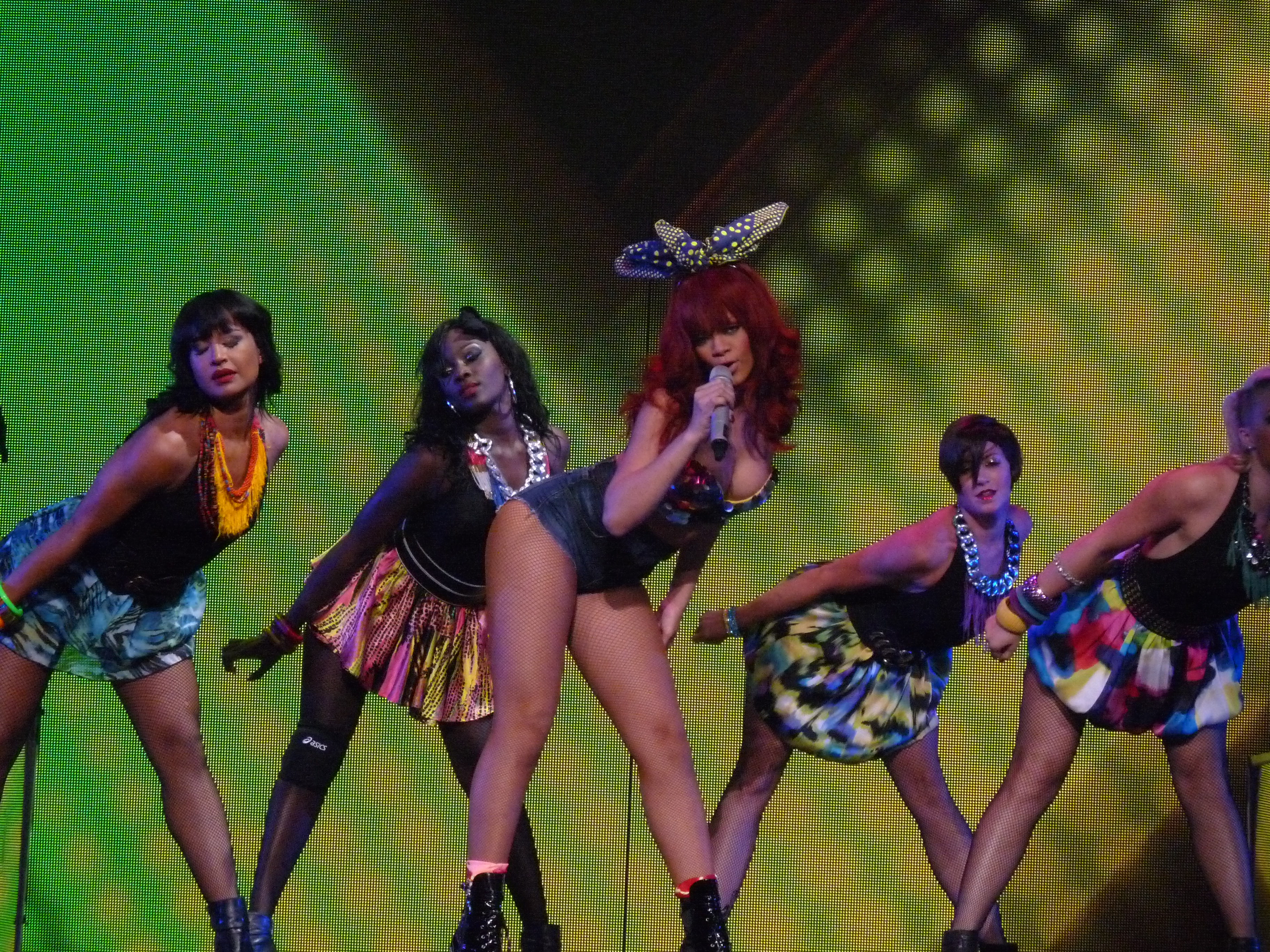
Rihanna performing "What's My Name?" on the Loud Tour

To further promote Loud, Rihanna embarked on her fourth concert tour, the Loud Tour, in June 2011, having announced it on February 9, 2011. The tour comprised 101 show dates, 32 in North America, 1 in Central America, 4 in South America and 64 in Europe. Tickets sold well in the United Kingdom and some additional shows were added. She performed ten shows at London's O_{2} Arena. Rihanna was interviewed by Ryan Seacrest on American Idol, and talked about the design of the stage, stating: "We've just designed the stage and we have a section that we are building ... where the fans can actually be in the show and in the stage and be closer than they've ever been. It's real VIP."

The North American leg of the tour began on June 4, 2011, in Baltimore, United States. Originally, J. Cole and CeeLo Green were planned as supporting acts for the North American leg. However, Green left the tour, citing schedule conflicts. Rappers Drake, Kanye West and Jay-Z made guest appearances on some dates to perform their collaborations "What's My Name?", "Run This Town", "All of the Lights" and "Umbrella", respectively. The tour was received positively by critics, with some calling it "Rihanna's best tour yet". Jane Stevenson of the Toronto Sun commented that "the two-hour, larger-than-life show lived up to the billing." Jon Brean of the Minneapolis "Star Tribune" remarked, "The Barbadian singer is more visually and vocally dynamic than she has ever been before."

== Critical reception ==
Professional ratings
Aggregate scores
Source	Rating
AnyDecentMusic?	6.2/10
Metacritic	67/100
Review scores
Source	Rating
AllMusic	3/5 stars
The A.V. Club	B−
Entertainment Weekly	A−
The Independent	3/5 stars
Los Angeles Times	3/4 stars
NME	7/10
Pitchfork	7.6/10
Rolling Stone	3/5 stars
Slant Magazine	3/5 stars
Spin	8/10

Loud received positive reviews from music critics. At Metacritic, which assigns a normalized rating out of 100 given to reviews from mainstream critics, the album received an average score of 67, based on 22 reviews. Jon Pareles of The New York Times perceived a "hermetic, cool calculation" on the album, writing that it "works the pop gizmos as neatly as any album this year, maintaining the Rihanna brand". Entertainment Weekly's Leah Greenblatt commented that Loud shows Rihanna "undefeated by her worst circumstances — and finding redemption in exactly the kind of pop nirvana that made her famous in the first place". James Reed of The Boston Globe called the album "an unabashed return to where Rihanna belongs: the dance floor" and stated: "As if liberating herself from the depths, she's a force on these 11 songs". Stacey Anderson of Spin commended Rihanna's "full, healthy claim to her sexuality" and wrote that the album "offers a confident female ethos on par with the best of Shakira or Beyoncé".

Genevieve Koski of The A.V. Club commended Rihanna for elevating the album's generic sound, writing that she "does sound invigorated, delivering charismatic vocal performances of material that doesn’t always warrant them". Emily Mackay of NME felt that its "experiments feel more organic, its tone better paced" than Rated R. Thomas Conner of the Chicago Sun-Times wrote that "the celebratory atmosphere of Rihanna's sassy new jams are seasoned with some of the darker flavors from 'Rated R'". Pitchfork's Ryan Dombal complimented the album's "effervescent pop" and stated: "Her laissez-faire attitude toward hit-making on Loud can result in too-safe moves or semi-experiments that come off surprisingly great". Ed Power of Hot Press complimented its "unabashedly subtext-free" songs and found its hooks "way beyond addictive."

In a mixed review, Andy Kellman of AllMusic found the album's material "slapdash" and "uneven", and called it "more an unfocused assortment of poor-to-solid songs than a unified set". Andy Gill of The Independent felt that "the more interesting tracks are those with less salacious demands on her vulnerability". Slant Magazine's Sal Cinquemani commended that "the subtle West Indian flavor with which Rihanna and company have smartly imbued" most of the album, although he noted some flaws in its production and wrote that "Rihanna has always had trouble fitting into one genre ... and for better or worse, Rihanna continues to stylistically branch out on Loud". Hugh Montgomery of The Observer commented that "sonically, it's fairly unremarkable ... but its strident buoyancy is difficult to resist".

"Only Girl (in the World)" won the Grammy Award for Best Dance Recording at the 53rd Annual Grammy Awards and the album was nominated for three awards at the 54th Grammy Awards, including Album of the Year, Best Pop Vocal Album and Best Rap/Sung Collaboration for "What's My Name?".

== Commercial performance ==
Loud debuted at number three on the US Billboard 200 chart, with first-week sales of 207,000 copies in the United States, giving Rihanna her highest first-week sales in the US at that time. It also debuted at number one on Billboard's R&B/Hip-Hop Albums chart. In its second week, the album dropped to number six on the Billboard 200 and sold 141,000 copies. By its thirteenth week, the album returned to its peak at number three and sold 62,000 copies. However, in its fourteenth week, the album dipped to number ten on the Billboard 200 with 45,000 copies sold. In its fifteenth week, Loud rose to number eight, selling an additional 33,000 copies in the US. By July 3, 2011, Loud was the eleventh-best selling album of 2011 in the United States, selling 598,000 copies between January 1, 2011, and July 3, 2011. Loud ranked as Billboard magazine's ninth-most successful album of 2011 on their year-end charts. As of May 2024, Loud was certified quintuple platinum by the Recording Industry Association of America (RIAA), denoting shipments of five million album-equivalent units in the United States, including pure album sales of 1.8 million copies in the US as of June 2015.

Loud was also a commercial success outside of the United States. In Canada, it debuted at number one on the Canadian Albums Chart, selling 27,000 copies in its first week. Loud sold more than 80,000 units in Canada, achieving platinum status by the first week of December 2010. By September 8, 2011, Loud had sold more than 240,000 copies in Canada. In France, the album debuted at number three with first-week sales of 17,304 copies. By its sixth week on the French charts, Loud achieved platinum status, reaching the 100,000 copies mark. In France, the album has sold 355,000 copies as of April 2013. In its second week on the Australian Albums Chart, Loud was certified platinum for shipments of over 70,000 copies. In Italy, the album reached number eleven. It became Rihanna's highest-charting album there until her sixth studio album Talk That Talk (2011) surpassed the record, peaking at number ten. Unapologetic (2012) did even better, peaking at number seven. Loud was her third consecutive number-one album in Switzerland. Loud debuted at number two on the German Albums Chart.

The album debuted at number two in the United Kingdom, with first week sales of 91,000 units. In its fifth week, the album sold 306,107 copies in the United Kingdom, giving the singer her first platinum-selling week in her career. In its seventh week on the chart, Loud reached number one, giving Rihanna her second UK number-one album. After seven weeks of sales, the album became the fourth best-selling album of 2010 in the UK. Loud was certified eight-times platinum by the British Phonographic Industry (BPI), marking shipments of 2.4 million copies to retailers. It was the biggest selling R&B and hip hop album of 2011 in the UK. As of August 2012, Loud is the fifth biggest selling digital album of all time. As of March 2015, Loud is the 45th best-selling album of the millennium in the United Kingdom. As of November 2011, the album has sold over 8 million copies worldwide.

== Track listing ==
Loud track listing
No.	Title	Writer(s)	Producer(s)	Length
1.	"S&M"	Mikkel S. Eriksen; Tor Erik Hermansen; Sandy Wilhelm; Ester Dean	Stargate; Sandy Vee; Kuk Harrell^{[a]}; Veronika Bozeman^{[a]}	4:03
2.	"What's My Name?" (featuring Drake)	Eriksen; Hermansen; Dean; Traci Hale; Aubrey Graham	Stargate; Harrell^{[a]}	4:23
3.	"Cheers (Drink to That)"	Andrew Harr; Jermaine Jackson; Stacy Barthe; Laura Pergolizzi; Corey Gibson; Chris Ivery; Lauren Christy; Graham Edwards; Avril Lavigne; Scott Spock; Robyn Fenty	The Runners; Makeba Riddick^{[a]}	4:21
4.	"Fading"	Darnell Dalton; Jamal Jones; Lamar Taylor; Quinton Amey; William Hodge	Polow da Don; Willy Will; Harrell^{[a]}; Bozeman^{[a]}	3:19
5.	"Only Girl (In the World)"	Crystal Johnson; Eriksen; Hermansen; Wilhelm	Stargate; Vee; Harrell^{[a]}	3:55
6.	"California King Bed"	Harr; Jackson; Priscilla Renea; Alex Delicata; Fenty	The Runners; Harrell^{[a]}	4:11
7.	"Man Down"	Shama Joseph; Timothy Thomas; Theron Thomas; Shontelle Layne; Fenty	Sham; Harrell^{[a]}	4:27
8.	"Raining Men" (featuring Nicki Minaj)	Melvin Hough II; Rivelino Wouter; Timothy Thomas; Theron Thomas; Onika Maraj	Mel & Mus; Harrell^{[a]}	3:44
9.	"Complicated"	C. "Tricky" Stewart; Dean	Stewart; Dean; Harrell^{[a]}	4:17
10.	"Skin"	Kenneth Coby; Ursula Yancy; Fenty	Soundz; Riddick^{[a]}; Harrell^{[a]}	5:03
11.	"Love the Way You Lie (Part II)" (featuring Eminem)	Alexander Grant; Holly Hafermann; Marshall Mathers	Alex da Kid; Harrell^{[a]}	4:56
Total length:				46:39

=== Notes ===
- ^{^[a]} signifies a vocal producer
- Deluxe and couture edition include the bonus DVD "Making of Loud".
- iTunes Store deluxe edition includes the piano version of "Love the Way You Lie (Part II)" and the music video and the pre-order only Mixin Marc & Tony Svejda Mix Show Edit of "Only Girl (in the World)".

=== Sample credits ===
- "Cheers (Drink to That)" contains samples from "I'm with You" (2002), as performed by Avril Lavigne and written by Lavigne, Scott Spock, Graham Edwards, and Lauren Christy.

== Personnel ==
Credits for Loud adapted from AllMusic, Apple Music and album's liner notes.

=== Musicians ===
- Rihanna – vocals, art direction, creative director, design, executive producer
- Stacy Barthe – backing vocals (track 3)
- Nuno Bettencourt – guitar (track 10)
- Ester Dean – backing vocals (tracks 1, 2, 4)
- Alex Delicata – electric and acoustic guitars (track 6)
- Drake – vocals (track 2)
- Eminem – vocals (track 11)
- Eric England – bass guitar (track 6)
- Mikkel S. Eriksen –instrumentation (track 1, 2, 5)
- Tor Erik Hermansen – instrumentation (track 1, 2, 5)
- Cristyle Johnson – backing vocals (track 5)
- Nicki Minaj – vocals (track 8)
- Priscilla Renea – backing vocals (track 6)
- Theron Thomas – backing vocals (track 8)
- Sandy Vee – instrumentation (tracks 1, 5)

=== Production ===
- Camilla Akrans – photography
- Veronika Bozeman – additional vocal production (tracks 1, 4)
- Noel Cadastre – assistant vocal engineer for Drake (track 2)
- Bobby Campbell – assistant vocal engineer (tracks 1, 2, 7, 9–11), mixing assistant (track 3)
- Ariel Chobaz – vocal engineer (track 8)
- Cary Clark – music engineer (track 7)
- Corey Shoemaker – music engineer (track 4)
- Carol Corless – package production
- Karin Darnell – make-up
- Mikkel S. Eriksen – music engineer (tracks 1, 2, 5)
- Jesus Garnica – mixing assistant (tracks 8–10)
- Chris Gehringer – mastering
- Brad Palmer – design, video director
- Brian Palmer – video director, video producer
- Josh Gudwin – vocal engineer (tracks 1, 2, 4–11)
- Mariel Haenn – stylist
- Alex Haldi – art direction, design
- Inaam Haq – assistant vocal engineer (tracks 3, 5)
- Kuk Harrell – vocal engineer (tracks 1, 2, 4–11)
- Koby Hass – assistant vocal engineer (track 8)
- Jaycen Joshua – mixing (tracks 8–10)
- Brandon Joner – assistant vocal engineer for Drake (track 2)
- JP Robinson – art direction, design
- Rob Katz – assistant vocal engineer (track 10)
- Alex da Kid – music engineer (track 11)
- Damien Lewis – additional and assistant engineer (tracks 1, 2, 4–6)
- Dane Liska – assistant vocal engineer (tracks 3, 5)
- Erik Madrid – mixing assistant (tracks 7, 11)
- Deborah Mannis-Gardner – sample clearance
- Scott Marcus – A&R
- Manny Marroquin – mixing (tracks 7, 11)
- Dana Nielsen – music engineer (track 8)
- Ben O'Neill – assistant music engineer (track 3)
- Ciarra Pardo – art direction, creative director, design
- Christian Plata – mixing assistant (tracks 7, 11)
- Antonio "L.A." Reid – executive producer
- Antonio Resendiz – assistant vocal engineer (track 3)
- Evan Rogers – executive producer
- Chad "C Note" Roper – music engineer (track 10)
- Brad Shea – assistant vocal engineer (tracks 3, 5)
- Noah "40" Shebib – vocal engineer for Drake (track 2)
- Ursula Stephen – hair stylist
- Jay Stevenson – music engineer (track 4)
- Mike Strange – vocal engineer for Emimem (track 11)
- Carl Sturken – executive producer
- Phil Tan – mixing (tracks 1, 2, 4–6)
- Brian "B-Luv" Thomas – music engineer (track 9)
- Marcos Tovar – vocal engineer (all tracks), mixing (track 3)
- Sandy Vee – mixing (tracks 1, 5), engineer (tracks 1, 4, 5)
- Jeff "Supa Jeff" Villanueva – music engineer (tracks 3, 6)
- Miles Walker – music engineer (tracks 1, 2, 5)
- Kyle White – assistant vocal engineer (track 6)
- Andrew Wuepper – music engineer (track 9)
- Robert Zangardi – stylist

== Charts ==
=== Weekly charts ===
Weekly chart performance for Loud
Chart (2010–11)	Peak position
Australian Albums (ARIA)	2
Australian Urban Albums (ARIA)	1
Austrian Albums (Ö3 Austria)	3
Belgian Albums (Ultratop Flanders)	3
Belgian Albums (Ultratop Wallonia)	2
Canadian Albums (Billboard)	1
Croatian International Albums (HDU)	1
Czech Albums (IFPI)	12
Danish Albums (Hitlisten)	2
Dutch Albums (Album Top 100)	6
European Albums (Billboard)	1
Finnish Albums (Suomen virallinen lista)	7
French Albums (SNEP)	3
German Albums (Offizielle Top 100)	2
Greek Albums (IFPI Greece)	10
Hungarian Albums (MAHASZ)	6
Irish Albums (IRMA)	1
Italian Albums (FIMI)	11
Japanese Albums (Oricon)	5
Mexican Albums (Top 100 Mexico)	17
New Zealand Albums (RMNZ)	4
Norwegian Albums (VG-lista)	1
Polish Albums (OLiS)	4
Portuguese Albums (AFP)	10
Russian Albums (2M)	3
Scottish Albums (Official Charts)	1
Slovenian Albums (IFPI)	3
South Korean Albums (Gaon)	12
South Korean International Albums (Gaon)	2
Spanish Albums (Promusicae)	6
Swedish Albums (Sverigetopplistan)	15
Swiss Albums (Schweizer Hitparade)	1
UK Albums (Official Charts)	1
UK R&B Albums (Official Charts)	1
US Billboard 200	3
US Top R&B/Hip-Hop Albums (Billboard)	1

Chart (2025)	Peak position
Portuguese Albums (AFP)	124

=== Year-end charts ===
Year-end chart performance for Loud
Chart (2010)	Position
Australian Albums (ARIA)	23
Australian Hip-Hop/R&B Albums (ARIA)	49
Austrian Albums (Ö3 Austria)	72
Belgian Albums (Ultratop Flanders)	64
Dutch Albums (Album Top 100)	83
French Albums (SNEP)	33
German Albums (Offizielle Top 100)	39
Hungarian Albums (MAHASZ)	62
Irish Albums (IRMA)	5
Italian Albums (FIMI)	96
New Zealand Albums (RMNZ)	25
Polish Albums (OLiS)	36
Russian Albums (2M)	51
Swiss Albums (Schweizer Hitparade)	21
UK Albums (Official Charts)	4
Worldwide Albums (IFPI)	7

Chart (2011)	Position
Australian Albums (ARIA)	13
Australian Hip-Hop/R&B Albums (ARIA)	2
Austrian Albums (Ö3 Austria)	33
Belgian Albums (Ultratop Flanders)	8
Belgian Albums (Ultratop Wallonia)	29
Canadian Albums (Billboard)	2
Danish Albums (Hitlisten)	22
Dutch Albums (Album Top 100)	31
French Albums (SNEP)	13
German Albums (Offizielle Top 100)	32
Hungarian Albums (MAHASZ)	37
Irish Albums (IRMA)	6
Italian Albums (FIMI)	52
Japanese Albums (Oricon)	64
New Zealand Albums (RMNZ)	19
Polish Albums (OLiS)	64
Spanish Albums (PROMUSICAE)	34
Swedish Albums (Sverigetopplistan)	39
Swiss Albums (Schweizer Hitparade)	6
UK Albums (Official Charts)	6
US Billboard 200	9
US Digital Albums (Billboard)	8
US Top R&B/Hip-Hop Albums	3
Worldwide Albums (IFPI)	8

Chart (2012)	Position
Australia Hip-Hop/R&B Albums (ARIA)	39
US Top R&B/Hip-Hop Albums	46

Chart (2014)	Position
Swedish Albums (Sverigetopplistan)	85

Chart (2015)	Position
Australia Hip-Hop/R&B Albums (ARIA)	77

Chart (2016)	Position
Australia Hip-Hop/R&B Albums (ARIA)	79

Chart (2017)	Position
Australia Hip-Hop/R&B Albums (ARIA)	80

Chart (2018)	Position
Australia Hip-Hop/R&B Albums (ARIA)	79

Chart (2019)	Position
Australia Hip-Hop/R&B Albums (ARIA)	71

Chart (2020)	Position
Australia Hip-Hop/R&B Albums (ARIA)	68

Chart (2021)	Position
Belgian Albums (Ultratop Flanders)	152

Chart (2022)	Position
Belgian Albums (Ultratop Flanders)	167

Chart (2023)	Position
Belgian Albums (Ultratop Flanders)	150
Swedish Albums (Sverigetopplistan)	74

Chart (2024)	Position
Australian Hip-Hop/R&B Albums (ARIA)	50
Belgian Albums (Ultratop Flanders)	112
Danish Albums (Hitlisten)	85
Dutch Albums (Album Top 100)	81
Icelandic Albums (Tónlistinn)	68
Swedish Albums (Sverigetopplistan)	38

Chart (2025)	Position
Australian Hip-Hop/R&B Albums (ARIA)	49
Belgian Albums (Ultratop Flanders)	114
Dutch Albums (Album Top 100)	77
German Albums (Offizielle Top 100)	71
Hungarian Albums (MAHASZ)	91
Icelandic Albums (Tónlistinn)	83
Swedish Albums (Sverigetopplistan)	33

=== Decade-end charts ===
Decade-end chart performance for Loud
Chart (2010–2019)	Position
Australian Albums (ARIA)	45
UK Albums (Official Charts)	11
US Billboard 200	101

=== All-time charts ===
All-time chart performance for Loud
Chart	Position
Irish Female Albums (IRMA)	13

== Certifications ==
Certifications and sales for Loud
Region	Certification	Certified units/sales
Australia (ARIA)	4× Platinum	280,000^{‡}
Austria (IFPI Austria)	Gold	10,000^{*}
Belgium (BRMA)	Platinum	30,000^{*}
Brazil (Pro-Música Brasil)	Platinum	40,000^{*}
Canada (Music Canada)	3× Platinum	240,000^{^}
Denmark (IFPI Danmark)	5× Platinum	100,000^{‡}
Germany (BVMI)	5× Gold	500,000^{‡}
Hungary (MAHASZ)	Gold	3,000^{^}
Ireland (IRMA)	5× Platinum	75,000^{^}
Italy (FIMI)	2× Platinum	100,000^{‡}
Japan (RIAJ)	Gold	100,000^{^}
New Zealand (RMNZ)	6× Platinum	90,000^{‡}
Poland (ZPAV)	3× Platinum	60,000^{*}
Portugal (AFP)	Gold	10,000^{^}
Russia (NFPF)	Gold	5,000^{*}
Singapore (RIAS)	Platinum	10,000^{*}
Spain (Promusicae)	Gold	30,000^{^}
Sweden (GLF)	2× Platinum	80,000^{‡}
Switzerland (IFPI Switzerland)	2× Platinum	60,000^{^}
United Kingdom (BPI)	8× Platinum	2,400,000^{‡}
United States (RIAA)	5× Platinum	5,000,000^{‡}
Summaries
Europe (IFPI)	3× Platinum	3,000,000^{*}
Worldwide	—	8,000,000
^{*} Sales figures based on certification alone.^{^} Shipments figures based on certification alone.^{‡} Sales+streaming figures based on certification alone.

== Release history ==
Region	Date	Format	Edition	Label
Australia	November 12, 2010	CD, CD+DVD	Standard, deluxe	Universal Music
Germany	November 12, 2010	CD, CD+DVD	Standard, deluxe	Universal Music
Ireland	November 12, 2010	Digital download	Standard	Universal Music
Netherlands	November 12, 2010	CD	Standard	Universal Music
France	November 15, 2010	CD, CD+DVD	Standard, deluxe	Universal Music
New Zealand	November 15, 2010	CD, CD+DVD	Standard, deluxe	Universal Music
Portugal	November 15, 2010	CD, CD+DVD	Standard, deluxe	Universal Music
Philippines	November 15, 2010	CD, CD+DVD	Standard, deluxe	MCA Music Phils.
United Kingdom	November 15, 2010	CD	Standard	Mercury Records
Mexico	November 16, 2010	CD	Standard	Universal Music
United States	November 16, 2010	CD, CD+DVD, digital download	Standard, deluxe	Def Jam Recordings
United States	November 16, 2010	CD+DVD	Deluxe (Couture edition)	Def Jam Recordings
Poland	November 19, 2010	CD	Standard	Universal Music
Brazil	November 30, 2010	CD	Standard	Universal Music
Indonesia	December 2, 2010	CD	Standard	Universal Music
Japan	January 19, 2011	CD	Standard	Universal Music

== See also ==
- List of UK Albums Chart number ones of the 2010s
- List of UK R&B Chart number-one albums of 2010
- List of UK R&B Chart number-one albums of 2011
- List of number-one albums of 2010 (Canada)
- List of number-one albums of 2010 (Ireland)
- List of number-one albums of 2011 (Ireland)
- List of number-one albums in Norway
- Scottish Singles and Albums Charts
- List of number-one hits of 2010 (Switzerland)
- List of albums which have spent the most weeks on the UK Albums Chart
