= Coming Home (Usher album) =

Studio album by Usher
- Released: February 9, 2024
- Recorded: 2019–2024
- Genre: R&B
- Length: 66:40
- Label: Mega; Gamma.
- Producer: Andrew Watt; B.A.M.; Bryan-Michael Cox; Busbee; Cirkut; D'Mile; Damon Thomas; Ghost Kid; H.E.R.; Hit-Boy; Jerk Pop; Jakub Liszko; Jermaine Dupri; JLack; Keith Thomas; Mel & Mus; Pharrell Williams; Pheelz; Rico Love; Ryan Daly; Tricky Stewart; Vaughn Oliver

Usher chronology
| A (2018) | Coming Home (2024) |

Singles from Coming Home
- 1. "Good Good" Released: August 4, 2023; 2. "Ruin" Released: February 2, 2024; 3. "Kissing Strangers" Released: February 9, 2024

Coming Home is the ninth studio album by American singer Usher. It was released on February 9, 2024, through his label Mega and Gamma., coinciding with his Super Bowl LVIII halftime show performance. It is Usher's first solo album since Hard II Love (2016) and follows the release of his collaborative album with record producer Zaytoven, A (2018). Coming Home features collaborations with Burna Boy, Summer Walker, 21 Savage, Latto, The-Dream, H.E.R., Pheelz, and Jungkook.

Coming Home peaked at number two on the US Billboard 200, and received generally favorable reviews from critics, while the lead single "Good Good" reached the top 30 on the Billboard Hot 100. At the 67th Annual Grammy Awards, Coming Home was nominated for Best R&B Album, but lost to Chris Brown's 11:11 (Deluxe). The album won R&B Album of the Year at the 2025 iHeart Radio Music Awards and nominated for Album of the Year at the 2024 BET Awards.

== Background and promotion ==
Following the headlining of his own residency at the Colosseum at Caesars Palace in Las Vegas, Nevada and numerous renewals ever since, Usher started gearing up for an upcoming album release in mid-2023. In July, the singer teamed up with French cognac producer Rémy Martin in a campaign titled "Life Is a Melody". An accompanying advertisement previewed an unreleased song called "Coming Home", a first hint at the title of his upcoming album. The track 'Risk It All' with H.E.R. was featured on the soundtrack to The Color Purple musical remake. The album's title references Raymond's promotion of the African-American culture within the state of Georgia and the city of Atlanta, specifically.

On September 24, 2023, it was announced that Usher would be the headliner of the Super Bowl LVIII halftime show, a self-described "honor of a lifetime". The event took place at the Allegiant Stadium in Las Vegas. He promised a show "unlike anything else they've seen" from him before. The musician announced the accompanying album to be released the same day, February 11, 2024; the release date was later changed to February 9. It includes the single "Good Good" with Summer Walker and 21 Savage. Usher stated that he and his team put a lot of creativity and effort into the record, in order "to tell a story that is open to interpretation" and is intended to connect with people. Coming Home is Raymond's first independent album, and supported by the tour Usher: Past Present Future (2024–2025).

== Critical reception ==
Professional ratings
Aggregate scores
| Source | Rating |
|---|---|
| AnyDecentMusic? | 6.1/10 |
| Metacritic | 76/100 |
Review scores
| Source | Rating |
| AllMusic | 3.5/5 stars |
| Clash | 6/10 |
| HipHopDX | 3.9/5 |
| The Independent | 3/5 stars |
| Pitchfork | 8.0/10 |
| Slant Magazine | 3/5 stars |
| The Daily Telegraph | 4/5 stars |

Coming Home received generally favorable reviews from critics. At Metacritic, which assigns a normalized rating out of 100 to reviews from mainstream critics, the album has an average score of 76 based on nine reviews. Jon Pareles, writing for The New York Times, remarked that the album had the singer return in "familiar guises." He found that Coming Home "sums up and expands what Usher does best," further noting that the "personas are familiar, and so is Usher's musical universe, with the supple physicality of his vocals floating in electronic soundscapes. But he still comes up with ingenious variations on his longtime subjects." In her review for Rolling Stone, Brittany Spanos wrote that Coming Home was "appropriately titled: the star's sprawling, twenty-song LP is nostalgic and familiar as Usher leans into the past without making it feel stale [...] The album is a reminder that he is pretty great at a lot of things. Glad he came home."

Neil McCormick from The Daily Telegraph called Coming Home a "cheesy but exuberant comeback album" as well as a hugely impressive reminder of Usher's pop skills, and another testament to the enduring appeal of high class R&B." He concluded: "It might even be the best of his career, if you can overlook the fact that at 20 tracks long it's a bit bloated." Pitchfork's Julianne Escobedo Shepherd wrote that Usher "remains most comfortable and effective playing the sensual lover with come-hither abs, where even the most blatant sexual metaphor doesn't come off as seamy" and he "maintains the versatility he's established through the years" on the album. Chuck Arnold from the New York Post described the album as a "refreshing return to real R&B" and found that Usher "hasn't lost any of his powers of seduction." AllMusic editor Andy Kellman noted that "like all of Usher's earlier post-millennial LPs, Coming Home is long and pieced together." He found that "Usher is in his element, at his most charming" throughout the album.

HipHopDX's Alex Siegel wrote that while the album was not "a completely smooth return to form," it felt "liberated from post-Confessions expectations and the gravity of current trends. This helps explain why the album is an at-times schizophrenic hodgepodge of sounds and styles." Clash critic Shahzaib Hussain remarked that "there's narrative cohesion, yes, but a leaner structure, and more daring in construction would have been welcomed. Still, Coming Home, in the context of a seasoned entertainer experiencing a career Renaissance, gives adoring fans a sprinkling of every musical touchstone in the R&B canon." Slant Magazine critic Paul Attard found that the "album feels less driven by creative ingenuity or an aesthetic vision than by sheer showmanship" and noted that some material on it "could have used some extra polish to reach its fullest potential." The Independent's Helen Brown called the album a collection of "cheesy seduction songs" and further commented: "Lyrical foreplay isn't exactly the singer's strong suit on this throwback album full of percussive panting." Less impressed, Mark Richardson from The Wall Street Journal called Coming Home "decidedly uneven, with a handful of awkward moments and dull patches."

== Commercial performance ==
In the United States, the album debuted at number two on the US Billboard 200, earning 91,000 album-equivalent units, calculated from 45.82 million on-demand streams and 53,000 pure album copies. Coming Home marks Usher's ninth top 10-charting album on the Billboard 200. The album marked the second highest debut of the week and was the best-selling album of the week, with 53,000 units sold: 47,500 digital sales and physical sales of 5,500 (4,000 on CD and 1,500 on vinyl). Its debut marked the largest first-week sales for an R&B album in more than four years, since Lionel Richie's 2019 live album Hello From Las Vegas sold 65,000 copies in its opening week. Coming Home marked Usher's fifth number-one album on Billboard's Top Album Sales chart, having previously topped the chart with Looking 4 Myself (2012), Raymond v. Raymond (2010), Here I Stand (2008), and Confessions (2004).

== Track listing ==
Coming Home track listing
| No. | Title | Writer(s) | Producer(s) | Length |
|---|---|---|---|---|
| 1. | "Coming Home" (with Burna Boy) | Usher Raymond IV; Damini Ogulu; Marc Byers; Phillip Moses | Pheelz | 3:15 |
| 2. | "Good Good" (with Summer Walker and 21 Savage) | Raymond; Summer Walker; Shéyaa Abraham-Joseph; Paul Dawson; Nija Charles; Keith Thomas; Tauren Stovall; Rafael Ishman; Caleb Ishman; Jakub Liszko; Jaylyn McDonald; Melvin Hough II; Rivelino Wouter | Mel & Mus | 4:07 |
| 3. | "A-Town Girl" (featuring Latto) | Raymond; Alyssa Stephens; Theron Thomas; K. Thomas; R. Ishman; MacDonald; Etdrick Bohannon; Dawson; Billy Joel | Ghost-Kid; K. Thomas^{[v]} | 3:32 |
| 4. | "Cold Blooded" (with The-Dream) | Raymond; Terius Gesteelde-Diamant; Pharrell Williams | The-Dream; Williams | 3:16 |
| 5. | "Kissing Strangers" | Raymond; James Abrahart Jr.; Jonny Price; Michael Busbee; Ryan Daly | Busbee; Ryan Daly^{[v]} | 3:08 |
| 6. | "Keep on Dancin'" | K. Thomas; R. Ishman; Camara Alford; Christopher Stewart; Jens Isaksen | Tricky Stewart; Jerk Pop | 3:11 |
| 7. | "Risk It All" (from the Original Motion Picture The Color Purple) (with H.E.R.) | Gabriella Wilson; James Napier | H.E.R. | 3:21 |
| 8. | "Bop" | Gesteelde-Diamant; Chauncey Hollis | The-Dream; Hit-Boy | 3:42 |
| 9. | "Stone Kold Freak" | Raymond; Bohannon; Dawson; Pierre Juan Ramos; Jakub Liszko; Richard Butler Jr.; K. Thomas | Ghost-Kid; Rico Love; K. Thomas; Rada Got Beatz; Jakob Malibu Lee | 3:34 |
| 10. | "Ruin" (with Pheelz) | Raymond; Moses; Ndumiso Manana | Pheelz | 3:01 |
| 11. | "Big" | Raymond; T. Thomas; Javiere Boswell | Chang^{[v]} | 3:27 |
| 12. | "On the Side" | Raymond; K. Thomas; T. Thomas; Johntá Austin; Patrick Smith; R. Ishman; Jermaine Mauldin; Bryan-Michael Cox | Jermaine Dupri; Cox | 3:03 |
| 13. | "I Am the Party" | Mauldin; Cox | Dupri; Cox | 3:39 |
| 14. | "I Love U" | Gesteelde-Diamant; Stewart; Dernst Emile II | The-Dream; Stewart; D'Mile | 3:17 |
| 15. | "Please U" | David Brown; Jackson Morgan; Isaac Bolivar; Anthony Watts; Vaughn Oliver; Earl Shuman; Leon Carr | Oliver | 2:58 |
| 16. | "Luckiest Man" | Raymond; K. Thomas; Maurice Simmonds; Akil King; Brandon Hodge | B.A.M.; Chang^{[v]} | 3:21 |
| 17. | "Margiela" | Raymond; Gesteelde-Diamant; James Lackey | The-Dream; JLack | 3:44 |
| 18. | "Room in a Room" | Raymond; Austin; Emile | Anthony R. Smith^{[v]} | 2:17 |
| 19. | "One of Them Ones" | Raymond; K. Thomas; R. Ishman; Stovall; MacDonald; Julian Morgan; Michael Coleman; Emile; Damon Thomas | D'Mile; D. Thomas | 3:13 |
| 20. | "Standing Next to You" (Usher remix) (with Jung Kook) | Raymond; Alexandra Tamposi; Jonathan Bellion; Johntá Austin; Andrew Wotman; Henry Walter | Andrew Watt; Cirkut; Smith^{[v]} | 3:34 |
| Total length: | | | | 66:40 |

Digital Skims bonus track
| No. | Title | Writer(s) | Producer(s) | Length |
|---|---|---|---|---|
| 21. | "Believe" | Raymond; Antoine Harris; Cox; Mauldin | Dupri; Cox | 3:31 |
| Total length: | | | | 70:11 |

Digital expanded edition bonus track
| No. | Title | Writer(s) | Producer(s) | Length |
|---|---|---|---|---|
| 22. | "Naked" | Raymond; Phillip Cornish; Patrick Hayes; Yountie Strickland; Michael Coleman; Maurice Ryan Toby | PhilTheKeys; Guitarboy; Big Yount | 4:42 |
| Total length: | | | | 74:53 |

Note

- ^{^[v]} signifies a vocal producer.
- On physical editions, "Keep on Dancin'" appears as the first track, a solo version of "Coming Home" appears as track five, and "Kissing Strangers" is track six. All other tracks retain their order.

== Personnel ==
Musicians

- Usher – vocals
- Pheelz – background vocals (track 1), vocals (10)
- Burna Boy – vocals (track 1)
- Summer Walker – vocals (track 2)
- 21 Savage – vocals (track 2)
- Latto – vocals (track 3)
- The-Dream – vocals (track 4)
- Christopher Stewart – keyboards (tracks 6, 14)
- Felly the Voice – background vocals (track 6)
- Tomi Martin – guitar (track 6)
- Jens Isaksen – keyboards (track 6)
- Ben Parris – keyboards, programming (track 6)
- H.E.R. – vocals (track 7)
- Mike Burton – horns (track 11)
- Wilber Williams – horns (track 11)
- Melvin Jones – horns (track 11)
- Jermaine Dupri – bass guitar, drums, programming (track 12, 21)
- Bryan-Michael Cox – keyboards, programming, synthesizer (track 12, 21)
- Dernst Emile II – bass guitar, keyboards (track 14)
- Izzy Fontaine – bass guitar, guitar (track 15)
- Vaughn Oliver – arrangement, drum programming, keyboards (track 15)
- Jon Bellion – chorus (track 20)
- Andrew Watt – chorus (track 20)
- Jungkook – chorus, vocals (track 20)

Technical

- Emerson Mancini – mastering
- Mike Bozzi – mastering, engineering (track 20)
- Patrizio "Teezio" Pigliapoco – mixing (tracks 1, 3, 9, 18, 19)
- Jessica Wong – mixing (track 2)
- Preston "Prizzie" Reid – mixing (track 2)
- Manny Marroquin – mixing (tracks 4, 5, 11, 15)
- Jaycen Joshua – mixing (tracks 6, 12–14)
- C. "Tricky" Stewart – mixing (track 7)
- Miles Walker – mixing (tracks 8, 16)
- Leslie Brathwaite – mixing (track 17)
- Serban Ghenea – mixing (track 20)
- Anthony R. Smith – mixing (track 20), engineering (1–7, 9–13, 15, 18–20)
- Brandon Harding – engineering (tracks 4, 8, 17), engineering assistance (14)
- Mike Larson – engineering (tracks 4, 8) engineering assistance (14)
- Kesha Lee – engineering (track 4)
- Morgan David – engineering (track 4)
- Ben "Bengineer" Chang – engineering (tracks 5, 11, 16)
- Richard Ledesma – engineering (track 6)
- Miki Tsutsumi – engineering (track 7)
- Dear Pricey – engineering (track 13)
- Brian Thomas – engineering (track 14)
- Vaughn Oliver – engineering (track 15)
- Chris "KingMixx" King – engineering (track 17)
- Ignacio Portale – mixing assistance (tracks 1, 3, 9, 18, 19
- Trey Station – mixing assistance (tracks 4, 5, 11, 15)
- Zach Pereyra – mixing assistance (tracks 4, 5, 11, 15)
- Anthony Vilchis – mixing assistance (tracks 4, 5, 11, 15)
- Mike Seaberg – mixing assistance (tracks 6, 12–14)
- Bryce Bordone – mixing assistance (track 20)
- Kyle Oueis – engineering assistance (tracks 1, 6, 11)
- Veronica "V2" Velez – engineering assistance (track 6)
- Colin Bryson – engineering assistance (track 7)
- Naruse Tsutsumi – engineering assistance (track 7)
- DJ Riggins – engineering assistance (tracks 12–14)
- Jacob Richards – engineering assistance (tracks 12–14)
- Rachel Blum – engineering assistance (tracks 12–14)

Artwork

- Aakomon Jones – art direction
- Bellamy Brewster – art direction, photography
- Allen Chiu – graphic design

== Charts ==
=== Weekly charts ===
Weekly chart performance for Coming Home
| Chart (2024) | Peak position |
|---|---|
| Australian Albums (ARIA) | 46 |
| Australian Hip Hop/R&B Albums (ARIA) | 12 |
| Austrian Albums (Ö3 Austria) | 65 |
| Belgian Albums (Ultratop Flanders) | 59 |
| Belgian Albums (Ultratop Wallonia) | 69 |
| Canadian Albums (Billboard) | 24 |
| Dutch Albums (Album Top 100) | 19 |
| French Albums (SNEP) | 51 |
| German Albums (Offizielle Top 100) | 61 |
| Japanese Hot Albums (Billboard Japan) | 36 |
| New Zealand Albums (RMNZ) | 22 |
| Nigerian Albums (TurnTable) | 34 |
| Portuguese Albums (AFP) | 169 |
| Swiss Albums (Schweizer Hitparade) | 24 |
| UK Albums (OCC) | 24 |
| UK Independent Albums (OCC) | 7 |
| UK R&B Albums (OCC) | 4 |
| US Billboard 200 | 2 |
| US Independent Albums (Billboard) | 2 |
| US Top R&B/Hip-Hop Albums (Billboard) | 2 |

=== Year-end charts ===
Year-end chart performance for Coming Home
| Chart (2024) | Position |
|---|---|
| US Top R&B/Hip-Hop Albums (Billboard) | 81 |
