= Mel & Mus =

American-Dutch producer and songwriter duo

- Origin: Washington, D.C.; Holland
- Genres: R&B; pop; hip-hop
- Occupations: Songwriters; producers
- Years active: 2009–present
- Members: Melvin Hough II; Rivelino Raoul Wouter

Mel & Mus are a Grammy-nominated Dutch songwriting and production duo best known for writing and producing the R&B/hip-hop hits "Don't Think They Know", "Barbie Dreams" and "Good Good".

== Career ==
In 2010, their song "Hit It Like This" received special recognition from the music magazine Rap-Up as a "must-hear song" on the Jamie Foxx album, Best Night of My Life, for its "club-primed" sound. The Rihanna and Nicki Minaj collaboration, "Raining Men" from the 2010 album Loud, was their breakthrough, appearing on various charts in both the United States and United Kingdom.

Mel & Mus next contributed two songs to the Chris Brown album X: "Songs On a 12 Play" and "Don't Think They Know" in 2013, which posthumously paired the noted R&B artist Aaliyah with Brown.

In 2023, they reached #1 on US Urban Radio with "Good Good", the lead single from Usher's ninth studio album, Coming Home. The single was Usher's first top 40 Billboard Hot 100 hit since 2016, and stayed on top of the Billboard Adult R&B Airplay chart for five weeks. The song was included on the Vibe "20 Best R&B Songs of 2023" list, praised for its "sexy, empathetic, and smooth southern bounce [coupled] with modern trap-tinged R&B". In 2025, Mel & Mus produced and co-wrote "Bae", the comeback single from Keri Hilson.

== Selected songwriting and production credits ==
Credits are from Discogs, Tidal, Spotify and AllMusic.

Title	Year	Artist	Album
"Somebody"	2009	Kristinia DeBarge	Exposed
"Raining Men" (featuring Nicki Minaj)	2010	Rihanna	Loud
"Hit It Like This"	2010	Jamie Foxx	Best Night of My Life
"Runaway Love"	2010	Justin Bieber	My Worlds: The Collection
"Runaway Love (Kanye West Remix)" (featuring Kanye West & Raekwon)	2011	Justin Bieber	Never Say Never: The Remixes
"I'm Legit" (featuring Ciara)	2012	Nicki Minaj	Pink Friday: Roman Reloaded – The Re-Up
"Get It Right"	2012	Keyshia Cole	Woman to Woman
"Don't Think They Know" (featuring Aaliyah)	2013	Chris Brown	X (Deluxe Edition)
"Beat of My Drum"	2013	Zendaya	Shake It Up: I Love Dance
"Made Of"	2013	Coco Jones	Made Of EP
"Can't Hold Back"	2014	Zara Larsson	1
"Gone"	2014	Alexis Jordan	Shelved Second Album
"Songs on 12 Play" (featuring Trey Songz)	2014	Chris Brown	X
"Not Long" (featuring Usher)	2015	Ludacris	Ludaversal
"Angels & Demons"	2015	Tamar Braxton	Calling All Lovers
"Live By The Gun" (featuring Akon)	2015	R. City	What Dreams Are Made Of
"It's Yo Shit" (featuring Wale)	2015	Chris Brown & Tyga	Fan of a Fan: The Album
"First Take" (featuring Bryson Tiller)	2016	Travis Scott	Birds in the Trap Sing McKnight
"Gimme Love"	2016	Kelly Rowland	Non-album single
"Remember Me"	2016	Jacob Latimore	Connection
"Love Drug"	2016	Jacob Latimore	Connection
"Nowhere"	2017	Chris Brown	Heartbreak on a Full Moon
"On & On" (featuring Tory Lanez & Belly)	2017	Juicy J	Rubba Band Business
"Barbie Dreams"	2018	Nicki Minaj	Queen
"Soho"	2018	Jaden Smith	The Sunset Tapes: A Cool Tape Story
"Pass Me By"	2019	Dinah Jane	Dinah Jane 1
"Melanin" (Featuring La La, City Girls, Ester Dean & Lupita Nyong'o)	2019	Ciara	Non-album single
"That Old Man"	2020	City Girls	City on Lock
"California" (Featuring Tyga)	2020	Usher	Non-album single
"Riot"	2022	Kane Brown	Different Man
"Good Good" (with Summer Walker & 21 Savage)	2023	Usher	Coming Home
"Bae"	2025	Keri Hilson	We Need to Talk: Love

== Awards and nominations ==
Year	Ceremony	Award	Result	Ref
2012	54th Annual Grammy Awards	Album of the Year (Loud)	Nominated	
