= Raining Men (Rihanna song) =

Single by Rihanna featuring Nicki Minaj

from the album Loud
- Released: December 7, 2010
- Recorded: 2010
- Studio: Platinum Sound Recording Studios, Electric Lady Studios (New York City); Glenwood Recording Studios, (Burbank, California)
- Genre: Hip hop
- Length: 3:44
- Label: Def Jam; SRP
- Songwriters: Melvin Hough II; Rivelino Wouter; Timothy Thomas; Theron Thomas; Onika Maraj
- Producers: Mel & Mus; Kuk Harrell

Rihanna singles chronology
"Who's That Chick?" (2010)	"Raining Men" (2010)	"All of the Lights" (2010)

Nicki Minaj singles chronology
"I Ain't Thru" (2010)	"Raining Men" (2010)	"Moment 4 Life" (2010)

"Raining Men" is a song by Barbadian singer Rihanna from her fifth studio album, Loud (2010). Written by Melvin Hough II, Rivelino Wouter, Timothy Thomas, Theron Thomas and Onika Maraj, and produced by Mel & Mus, the song was sent to urban radio on December 7, 2010, as the album's third single in the United States, and was re-sent to urban radio on January 25, 2011. A hip hop song, it features rap vocals by Nicki Minaj and instrumentation consisting of sirens, bass, and hip hop drums. The song's lyrics revolve around how there is an endless supply of men available in the world. The song garnered a mixed response from music critics; some praised the chemistry between Rihanna and Minaj, while others commented that it bore strong resemblances to Beyoncé's song "Diva" with regard to its composition, and were critical of the notion.

Upon the release of Loud, "Raining Men" charted on the singles charts in South Korea, the United Kingdom and the United States on the strength of download sales. In South Korea, the song peaked at number 41, while in the United Kingdom it peaked at number 142 on the UK Singles Chart and number 31 on the UK R&B Chart. In the United States, it peaked at number 11 on the Bubbling Under Hot 100, making this Rihanna's third single that failed to reach the US Billboard Hot 100 chart ("We Ride", "Wait Your Turn"). Following the song's release to US urban radio, "Raining Men" peaked at number 48 on the Hot R&B/Hip-Hop Songs chart. No music video was shot for the song, and it received no televised performances as part of promotion. The song was included on the set list of the Loud Tour (2011). The performance featured Rihanna in a camouflage inspired outfit, accompanied by dancers in the same attire who held pink rifles.

== Recording and production ==
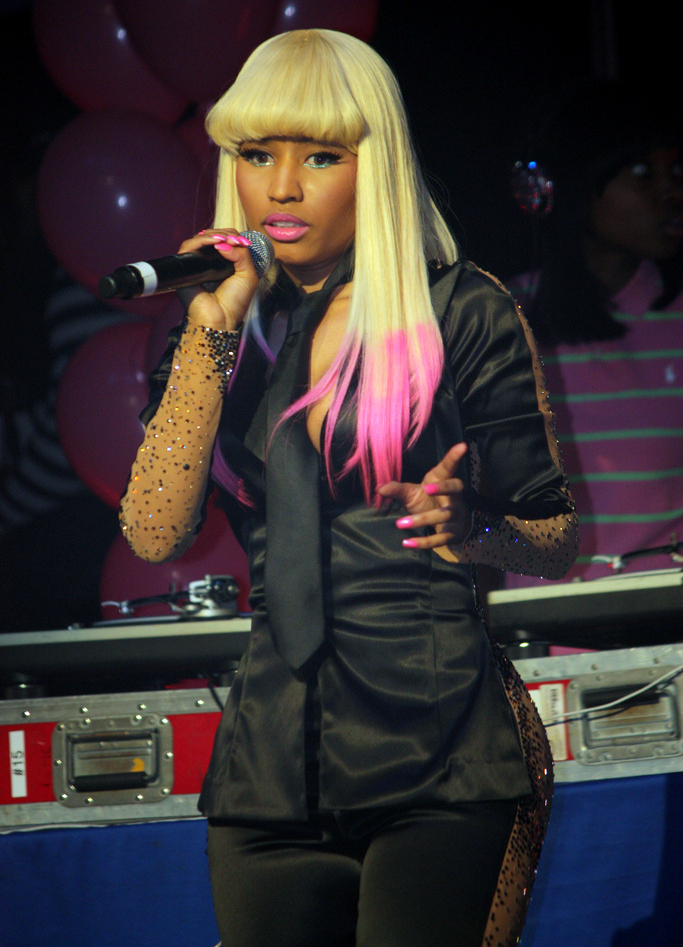
"Raining Men" received mixed reviews from critics, who praised the chemistry between Rihanna and Nicki Minaj (pictured), but criticized the song for failing to create anything new or original.

"Raining Men" was written by Melvin Hough II, Rivelino Wouter, Timothy Thomas, Theron Thomas and Nicki Minaj (credited as Onika Maraj), with instrumental production of the song done by Mel & Mus. It features rap vocals by Minaj; Rihanna's and Minaj's vocals were recorded by Kuk Harrell, Josh Gudwin, Marcos Tovar and Aerial Chobaz at Platinum Sound Recording Studios; Manhattan, New York City; Electric Lady Studios, Greenwich Village, New York City and Glenwood Recording Studios, Burbank, California. Koby Hass served as the assistant vocal recorder. The song's music was recorded by Dana Nielsen, and was mixed by Jaycen Joshua. Jesus Garnica served as the mixing assistant.

== Conception and development ==
"Raining Men" marked the second collaboration between Rihanna's and Minaj, the first being Minaj's song "Fly", from her album Pink Friday (2010), on which Rihanna appeared as a guest vocalist. During an interview with Capital FM radio station in London, England, Rihanna revealed that herself and Minaj had written songs together, specifically ballads, for possible inclusion on the former's fourth studio album, Rated R (2009); however, none of the songs made the final track listing. Rihanna concluded her statement by saying that she could not wait to collaborate with the rapper again for her fifth studio album, the at the time unreleased and unnamed Loud. When questioned about what "Raining Men" was like, the singer stated that it is "a really fun song. Nothing like the original. It's quite uptempo but kind of quirky and funny."

In the same interview, Rihanna explained why she liked to collaborate with Minaj, saying "She has a great buzz and she has a 'thing' to her. She is a star and that's why people love her. She's also really entertaining with her visual as well as her lyrics, and she has a great melody." The singer continued to reveal how she was impressed with Minaj's songwriting abilities, saying "I'm really amazed that she can write like that. [Nicki] not only raps but she can write songs too ... It was really easy actually. We were going back and forth with the texts on how we were going to get to do it because we were in two different places and had two opposite schedules." In an interview with DJ Semtex for BBC Radio, Minaj explained how the concept for her rap verse developed, revealing "I just wanted to be crazy, I wrote that track in bed actually. I had an off day, they sent me a record and said they needed it back in 24 hours and I wrote." With regard to the original, "It's Raining Men", Minaj stated that she wanted to make "Raining Men" "more melodic and crazy." "Raining Men" was sent for urban radio adds as the third single from Loud on December 7, 2010. On January 25, 2011, the song was re-released for urban radio adds.

== Composition ==
"Raining Men" is a hip hop song, with a "shiny trap beat", that lasts for a duration of 3:44 (3 minutes, 44 seconds). The song is not a cover of The Weather Girls song "It's Raining Men", composed by Paul Jabara and Paul Shaffer, however it is based on it with regard to its lyrical content and does sample it. Instrumentation consists of sirens and "mind-melting" bass. The song is written in the key of B♭major and is set in simple time with a moderated hip-hop groove, with a metronome of 80 beats per minute. "Raining Men"'s composition was likened to the work of M.I.A. by Emily McKay for NME. Stacey Anderson for Spin commented on Minaj's vocal stylization of the word "really," writing that she projects the word as a "breathless contortion into its own fully demented sideshow," with regard to the fast speed in which Minaj raps. James Reed for The Boston Globe described Minaj's verse as a "manic guest rhyme". Rihanna's vocal range in the song spans from the low note of G_{3} to the high note of B♭_{4}. According to Jon Pareles for The New York Times, the song's lyrics revolve around Rihanna and Minaj "singing and rapping about an endless supply of available men." Lyrically, Kevin O'Donnell of Spin described the song as Rihanna and Minaj's own "female empowerment anthem.

== Critical reception ==
The song was met with mixed reviews from music critics. Jon Pareles and Jon Caramanica of The New York Times commented that "Rihanna shares the mechanized, chattering beat of 'Raining Men' with Nicki Minaj, singing and rapping about an endless supply of available men". Stacey Anderson of Spin commented that the song is the highlight of the album, calling it "a gloriously eccentric collaboration with Nicki Minaj that entwines their minor-key hyperventilating, air sirens dissolving into mind-melting bass, and the scene-stealing Minaj's breathless contortion of the simple word 'really' into its own fully demented sideshow". BBC Music also commended Minaj's presence on the song, saying that "Nicki Minaj makes for a superb partner in crime on Raining Men, her wild, kinetic flow complementing Rihanna’s steely delivery to wicked effect". Jim Farber for New York Daily News said that "Rihanna pairs just as well with Nicki Minaj, on a complete tear-down on the old Weather Girls disco standard 'It's Raining Men.' Here it's not a gay song of lust but a statement of assurance that no man should incite too much worry, considering their sheer numbers". Chris Richards of The Washington Post said that "Nicki Minaj, a quick-witted rapper able to assume the voices of a dozen characters in a single song, fails to impart any wisdom on her colleague with "Raining Men". Emily Mackay of NME said that "Raining Men" is a bold collaboration between Rihanna and Minaj, which plays to both of their strengths in the "hip-pop" collaboration.

August Brown for the Los Angeles Times said that "'Cheers (Drink to That)' and 'Raining Men,' as foamy and spunky as they may be, are such a dogleg turn from Rated R that they come off as little more than image recalibration. That's her prerogative as an artist, and it's certainly earned. But it underscores the one thing we've always wondered about Rihanna — what is she really feeling?". Ryan Dombal of Pitchfork Media was more critical of the song, commenting that "Raining Men is a shameless Beyoncé rip-off that would be quickly dismissed if not for the fact that it's a pretty-damn-good Beyoncé rip off with a characteristically scene-stealing guest verse from Nicki Minaj". James Reed of The Boston Globe also noticed the similarity between the song's composition and the work of American R&B recording artist Beyoncé, saying "'Raining Men', borrowing a digitized riff from Beyoncé's 'Diva', features rising rapper Nicki Minaj on a typically manic guest rhyme. The song's message doubles as the album's mantra: Some cats really do have nine lives".

== Chart performance ==
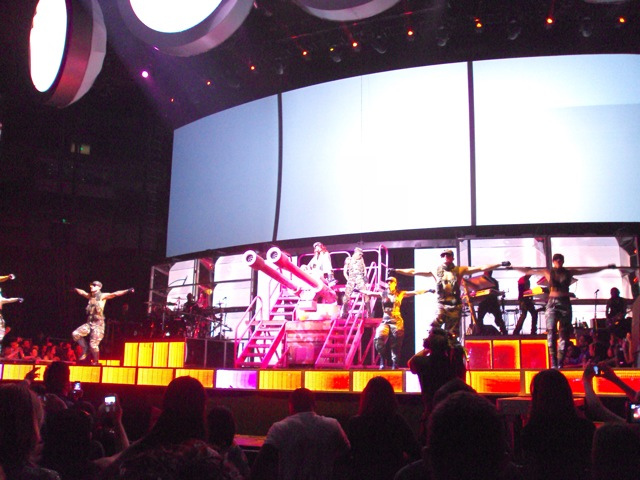
Rihanna performing "Raining Men" on the Loud Tour in Oakland, California

Upon the release of Loud, "Raining Men" charted in South Korea, the United Kingdom and the United States on the strength of digital download sales. The song debuted at number 41 on the South Korea Gaon International Chart on November 14, 2010, and fell to number 85 the following week before dropping out of the chart. It debuted and peaked at number 142 on the UK Singles Chart on November 27, 2010. The song was more successful on the UK R&B Chart, where it peaked at number 30 in the same chart issue. "Raining Men" peaked at number 11 on the US Bubbling Under Hot 100, a component chart which represents the 25 songs which failed to make an impact on the Billboard Hot 100 chart. The song debuted at number 69 US Hot R&B/Hip-Hop Songs chart for the week of December 25, 2010. It peaked at number 48 on the US Hot R&B/Hip-Hop Songs.

== Live performances ==
"Raining Men" was included on the set list of the Loud Tour in 2011. The performance featured Rihanna in a camouflage inspired outfit, and was accompanied by dancers in the same attire who held pink rifles. The set included a pink tank which was also present on the Rated R supported tour, Last Girl on Earth Tour (2010/11). It began with Rihanna appearing on stage sitting on the pink tank as it was wheeled from the back of the stage to the front while Minaj's rap verse played; Rihanna then concluded the song with her vocals. "Raining Men" was preceded by "Hard" and "Breakin' Dishes", and featured the singer wearing the same outfit and set design. Minaj has also performed her verse on her Pink Friday: Reloaded Tour.

== Credits and personnel ==
Credits adapted from the liner notes of Loud, Def Jam Recordings, SRP Records.

Recording

- Vocal recording – Platinum Sound Recording Studios (New York City, NY); Electric Lady Recording Studios (New York City, NY); Glenwood Studios (Burbank, CA)
- Music recording – Cahuenga Pass Studio (Los Angeles, CA)
- Mixing – Larrabee Sound Studios (Los Angeles, CA)

Personnel

- Songwriting – Melvin Hough II, Rivelino Wouter, Timothy Thomas, Theron Thomas, Onika Maraj
- Production – Mel & Mus
- Vocal production and recording – Kuk Harrell, Josh Gudwin, Marcos Tovar, Aerial Chobaz
- Assistant vocal production and recording – Koby Hass
- Music recording – Dana Neilsen
- Mixing – Jaycen Joshua
- Assistant mixing – Jesus Garnica
- Featured vocals – Nicki Minaj
- Bathroom vocals – Theron Thomas

== Charts ==
Chart (2010–11)	Peak position
South Korea (Gaon)	41
UK Singles (OCC)	142
UK R&B (OCC)	30
US Bubbling Under Hot 100 (Billboard)	11
US Hot R&B/Hip-Hop Songs (Billboard)	48

== Radio history ==
Country	Date	Format	Label
United States	December 7, 2010	Urban radio	Def Jam Recordings
United States	January 25, 2011	Urban radio (re-release)	Def Jam Recordings
