= Good Good (Usher, Summer Walker and 21 Savage song) =

Single by Usher, Summer Walker and 21 Savage

from the album Coming Home
- Released: August 4, 2023
- Genre: R&B
- Length: 4:07 (LP version); 3:20 (Radio edit)
- Label: Mega/Gamma
- Songwriters: Usher Raymond IV; Summer Walker; Shéyaa Abraham-Joseph; Caleb Ishman; Jaylyn Denaie Macdonld; Keith Thomas; Rafael Ishman; Melvin Hough II; Paul Dawson; Rivelino Wouter; Tauren Stovall
- Producer: Mel & Mus

Usher singles chronology
"Hrs and Hrs" (remix) (2023)	"Good Good" (2023)	"Boyfriend" (2023)

Summer Walker singles chronology
"So Be It" (remix) (2023)	"Good Good" (2023)	"Songs About U" (2024)

21 Savage singles chronology
"Sittin' on Top of the World" (2023)	"Good Good" (2023)	"Both" (2023)

Music video
- "Good Good" on YouTube

"Good Good" is a song by American singers Usher and Summer Walker and American rapper 21 Savage. In addition to the three artists, the track was written by Caleb Ishman, Rafael Ishman, Jaylyn Denaie Macdonald, Keith Thomas, Paul Dawson, Tauren Stovall, and producers Mel & Mus. It was released through Mega/Gamma on August 4, 2023, as the lead single from Usher's ninth studio album Coming Home (2024). In the United States, it peaked at number 25 on the Billboard Hot 100 chart, becoming Usher's first top-40 hit since "No Limit" from his 2016 album Hard II Love.

== Background ==
Usher told USA Today during a 2023 interview, that "Some of it is just that, growing through life experiences to figure out, and just because we're not 'good good' doesn't mean we can't be good with each other." In an interview with People, he also stated:

"Good Good" is about being in a relationship with someone and ultimately letting them know like, "Yo, we don't have to be enemies." We might not be good good, meaning we may have not made it to forever, meaning we may not have been the relationship that was going to last forever in the way that you thought, but we can be good.

== Composition ==
The song was described as "recalling" Atlanta bounce and musical elements reminiscent of the early 2000s. "Good Good" opens with the chorus and first verse from Usher, who addresses a failed relationship and wishes his ex-lover the best, still holding love for her and hoping she finds her soulmate. In the second verse, Summer Walker offers a perspective from a woman, while in the third verse 21 Savage reminisces his past relationship and expresses willingness to support his ex in any way (including financially), even when they are no longer romantically involved.

== Critical reception ==
Alexander Cole of HotNewHipHop commented the song has an "updated take on Usher's style that doesn't feel out of place", before writing "As for the featured guests on the track, they certainly make an impression. Summer Walker sounds great as always, all while 21 Savage continues his solid feature run. Overall, this is a great summer track that fans are going to be adding to their playlists in no time."

== Music video ==
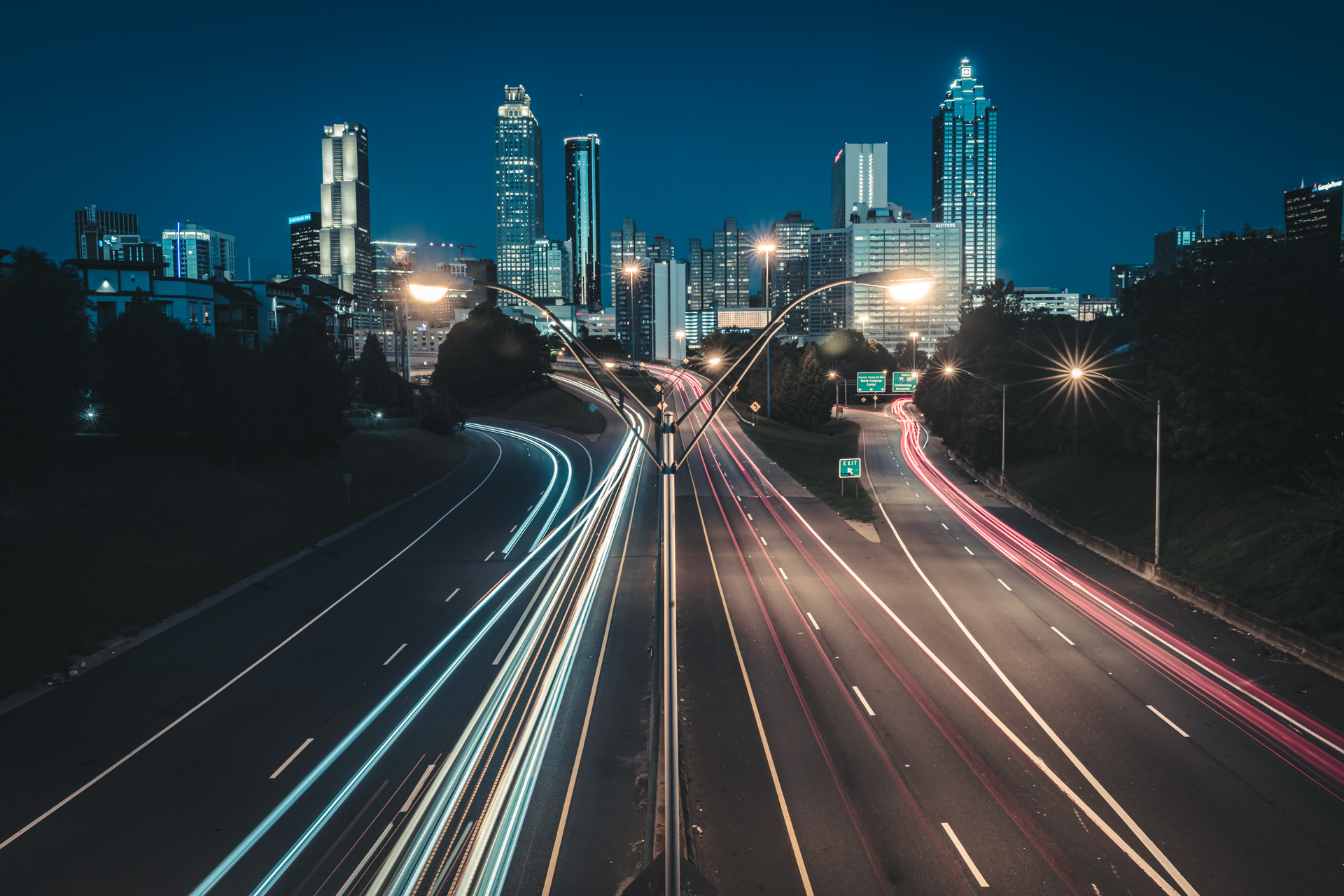
The Downtown Atlanta skyline as seen from the Jackson Street Bridge overlooking the Freedom Parkway interchange

An official music video premiered on August 23, 2023. It pays tribute to the videos of Usher's songs "You Make Me Wanna..." and "Burn". Directed by Warren Fu, it is mainly set on the Jackson Street Bridge, where the three artists stand on in the opening scene, and also features shots of other landmarks in Atlanta. Dressed in a baggy, black hooded sweatsuit paired with wave cap, chains and gold teeth, Usher dances atop the bridge by himself in front of the city skyline and sunset. He sings his verse in a dimly lit bedroom while dressed in a paisley suit, with two clones of himself appearing, and wears a new outfit after an evening shot. Summer Walker performs from her own bedroom, laying across the bed in a blonde updo and silky outfit. Like Usher, she is also joined by two clones and changes her outfit after filming in the dark, into a bathrobe and headwrap. 21 Savage raps his verse at a dinner table in an empty restaurant as he eats with a mirror image of himself wearing an identical but red outfit appearing next to him, both of them dining on a seafood meal.

The music video on YouTube has received over 117 million views as of March 2025.

== Artwork ==
The official artwork was created by Bellamy Brewster, it features Usher, clad in shades, and obscured behind a transparent veil.

== Charts ==
=== Weekly charts ===
Weekly chart performance for "Good Good"
Chart (2023–2024)	Peak position
New Zealand Hot Singles (RMNZ)	7
US Billboard Hot 100	25
US Hot R&B/Hip-Hop Songs (Billboard)	7
US Pop Airplay (Billboard)	13
US Rhythmic Airplay (Billboard)	2

=== Year-end charts ===
2023 year-end chart performance for "Good Good"
Chart (2023)	Position
US Hot R&B/Hip-Hop Songs (Billboard)	70
US Rhythmic (Billboard)	47

2024 year-end chart performance for "Good Good"
Chart (2024)	Position
US Billboard Hot 100	79
US Hot R&B/Hip-Hop Songs (Billboard)	25
US Mainstream Top 40 (Billboard)	36
US Rhythmic (Billboard)	44
US Adult R&B Songs (Billboard)	1

== Certifications ==
Certifications for "Good Good"
Region	Certification	Certified units/sales
New Zealand (RMNZ)	Gold	15,000^{‡}
^{‡} Sales+streaming figures based on certification alone.
