= Super Bowl LVIII halftime show =

Event during the 2024 Super Bowl

- Part of: Super Bowl LVIII
- Date: February 11, 2024
- Location: Paradise, Nevada, U.S.
- Venue: Allegiant Stadium
- Headliner: Usher
- Special guests: Alicia Keys, Jermaine Dupri, H.E.R., will.i.am, Lil Jon, Ludacris, Sonic Boom of the South
- Sponsor: Apple Music
- Director: Hamish Hamilton
- Producer: Jesse Collins; Roc Nation

Super Bowl halftime show chronology
LVII (2023)	LVIII (2024)	LIX (2025)

The Super Bowl LVIII halftime show, officially known as the Apple Music Super Bowl LVIII Halftime Show, was the halftime entertainment of Super Bowl LVIII, which took place on February 11, 2024, at Allegiant Stadium in Paradise, Nevada. It featured Usher as the headline performer, with guest appearances by Alicia Keys, will.i.am, Lil Jon, Ludacris, H.E.R, and Sonic Boom of the South. The show was televised nationally by CBS and streamed on Paramount+ and the Apple Music app. The television broadcast was watched by 129 million viewers in the US, making it the third most watched halftime show in history.

== Background ==
=== Artists in contention to headline the halftime show ===
Throughout summer 2023, there were various names being reported to be performing at the halftime show, including former One Direction member and British singer Harry Styles to promote his recent album Harry's House, which won the Album of the Year Award at the 2023 Grammy Awards. Taylor Swift was reportedly considered for the show; she later pulled out of the running due to having prior commitments such as her Eras Tour, which was reported by Cosmopolitan in August 2023. Still, Swift was in attendance, leading to speculation that her popularity helped cause the actual football game (and the halftime show as a carryover) to become to the most-viewed television broadcast in modern history. Miley Cyrus was another artist also being considered to headline the show. Other rumored artists included Bad Bunny, Jack Harlow, and NSYNC. Usher was informed of his selection on August 11, 2023.

=== Headliner announcement ===
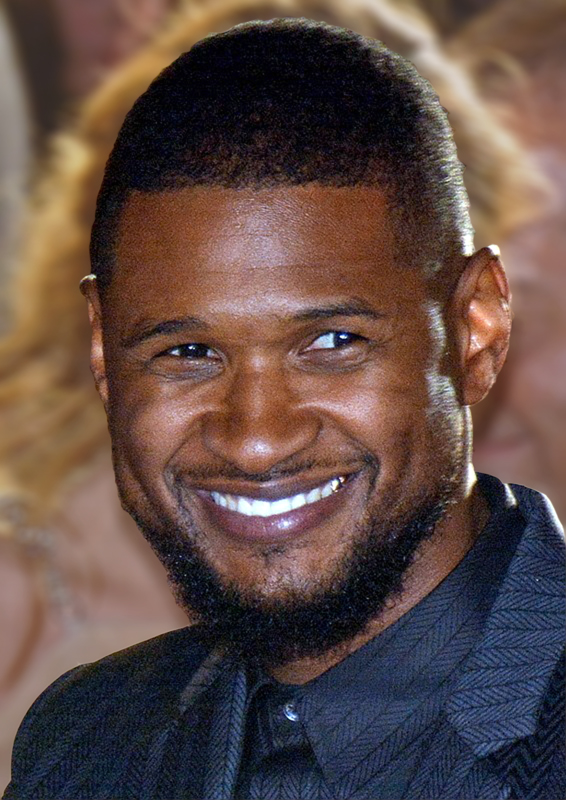
Usher headlined the halftime show as part of Super Bowl LVIII on February 11, 2024, two days after the release date of his ninth studio album Coming Home.

On September 24, 2023, it was announced that Usher would headline the show with this being his second appearance at a halftime show following the Super Bowl XLV halftime show which was headlined by American musical group the Black Eyed Peas where he was a guest alongside Slash, making Raymond the first act to perform during both a Super Bowl and an NBA Finals. He had been reported to be a potential headliner for a while after extending his residency at the MGM Grand Garden Arena. His participation is the latest result of the National Football League (NFL)'s partnership with Jay Z's entertainment agency Roc Nation, which was signed in 2019 to boost the quality of the halftime shows. Coincidentally, Usher marked his thirtieth anniversary as a solo artist (1994–2024), and the lead-up to his headlining prominently made note of that fact. After his announcement as the headliner, he said: "It's a honor of a lifetime to finally check a Super Bowl performance off my bucket list. I can't wait to bring the world a show unlike anything else they've seen from me before". Speaking to Apple Music's Zane Lowe on potential guests, he said, "Well, one thing I can say is that I have collaborated with a lot of incredible artists throughout the years," including fellow singers and rappers Alicia Keys, will.i.am, Lil Jon, Ludacris, and H.E.R. playing guitar. As a nod to Black History Month, the HBCU marching band Sonic Boom of the South played on-field brass and percussion.

=== Alicia Keys' vocal gaffe ===
Alicia Keys' voice cracked at the beginning of her performance of "If I Ain't Got You". In the YouTube upload of the halftime show, the NFL scrubbed the mistake by editing in the correct notes from a prior rehearsal performance to fix Keys' off-key and pitchy vocals.

== Reception ==
In a four-star review, Adrian Horton of The Guardian described the performance "frenetic and daring" while "at times chaotic and uncharacteristically wobbly". Dominic Patten of Deadline Hollywood wrote "as tight as the tone and pacing of the performance was, Usher felt very 20 years ago and flat," compared to the previous two shows and Andra Day's "Lift Every Voice and Sing" performance.

This was the 32nd edition of the Super Bowl Halftime Show, and topped out with 129.3 million concurrent viewers, making it the biggest television audience in its history since the inaugural show featuring Michael Jackson (133.4 million).

Usher's album, Coming Home, was propelled to No. 2 on the Billboard 200 charts upon its debut the following week with 91,000 units moved. The record held the #1 slot on iTunes the week leading up the big game.

The show was nominated for Outstanding Variety Special (Live), Outstanding Lighting Design / Lighting Direction for a Variety Special and Outstanding Technical Direction and Camerawork for a Special at the 76th Primetime Creative Arts Emmy Awards.

== Set list ==
Setlist adapted from Business Insider.

1. "My Way" (intro)
2. "Caught Up"
3. "U Don't Have to Call" (with elements of "Superstar")
4. "Love in This Club"
5. "If I Ain't Got You" (with Alicia Keys)
6. "My Boo" (with Alicia Keys)
7. "Confessions Part II" (with introduction by Jermaine Dupri and elements of "Nice & Slow")
8. "Burn"
9. "U Got It Bad" (with H.E.R. and elements of "Bad Girl")
10. "OMG" (with will.i.am and elements of "Can You Feel It and "Jumpman")
11. "Turn Down for What" (Lil Jon)
12. "Yeah!" (with Lil Jon, Ludacris and elements of "Freek-a-Leek" and "Get Low")
