= List of Felicity episodes =

Felicity is an American drama television series created by J. J. Abrams & Matt Reeves. Abrams and Reeves share executive producer duties with Brian Grazer, Tony Krantz, Jennifer Levin, Ron Howard, John Eisendrath & Laurie McCarthy. It was produced by Touchstone Television (now known as ABC Signature) and Imagine Television. The series first aired on September 29, 1998, and ended on May 22, 2002, after four seasons on The WB.

The series revolves around the fictional college experiences of the title character, Felicity Porter (portrayed by Keri Russell), as she attends the "University of New York" (based on New York University). While Felicity works to sort out her emotions, she continues the basic motions of student life and moves into her dorm. There, she meets the resident advisor Noel Crane (Scott Foley). Eventually, romance ensues, and the relationships among Felicity, Ben, and Noel form the basic dramatic conflicts in the show throughout the series.

A number of other characters appear and play large roles in Felicity's life, including her close-knit group of roommates and friends. A recurring episode opener of the show is a stark camera shot of Felicity sitting in a dormitory room or apartment holding a tape recorder, recalling events in order to make a cassette tape to send to an old friend named Sally Reardon (voiced by Janeane Garofalo). This occasionally provides a method for Felicity to narrate an entire episode. At the end of episodes like this, Felicity is often shown to be listening to a tape that Sally has sent in reply.

In 2007, Felicity was one of Time magazine's "100 Best TV Shows of All-Time." AOL TV named Felicity one of the "Best School Shows of All Time." In June 2010, Entertainment Weekly named Felicity Porter one of the "100 Greatest Characters of the Last 20 Years".

Over the course of four seasons, Felicity aired a total of 84 episodes. Each season corresponds to the traditional American university divisions of freshman, sophomore, junior, and senior years.

== Series overview ==
Season	Episodes	Originally released	
Season	Episodes	First released	Last released
1	22	September 29, 1998	May 25, 1999
2	23	September 26, 1999	May 24, 2000
3	17	October 4, 2000	May 23, 2001
4	22	October 10, 2001	May 22, 2002

== Episodes ==
=== Season 1 (1998–1999) ===
No. overall	No. in season	Title	Directed by	Written by	Original release date	Viewers (millions)
1	1	"Pilot"	Matt Reeves	J. J. Abrams	September 29, 1998	7.11
On her day of graduation, Felicity (Keri Russell) asks a longtime high school crush, Ben (Scott Speedman), to sign her yearbook; after she reads his message, in which he says that he would have liked to have known her better, Felicity changes her lifelong college plans to follow Ben to a New York university. There, she meets her quirky (and smitten) resident advisor Noel (Scott Foley) and her first new friend Julie (Amy Jo Johnson).
2	2	"The Last Stand"	Matt Reeves	J. J. Abrams	October 6, 1998	5.33
When Felicity learns a male called the admissions office requesting a copy of her application essay, she assumes it was Ben — the subject of said essay — and sends him a copy. Meanwhile, Felicity's parents pop up in New York again.
3	3	"Hot Objects"	Brad Silberling	J. J. Abrams	October 13, 1998	5.43
Felicity's excited about attending her first college party, and plans to invite Ben — so long as Julie doesn't mind. Meanwhile, Felicity butts heads with a professor (Harold Gould), and meets a fellow competitive student Elena (Tangi Miller).
4	4	"Boggled"	Todd Holland	Mimi Schmir & J. J. Abrams	October 20, 1998	5.45
After Noel acts on his feelings for Felicity and kisses her during a game of Boggle, the two decide to go on a "maybe date" to discuss the future of their relationship. Julie befriends an aspiring filmmaker.
5	5	"Spooked"	Joan Tewkesbury	Jennifer Levin	October 27, 1998	5.16
After Felicity and Ben are held up, he seems especially spooked and calls on her for late-night chats, one of which includes an invitation to a Halloween party.
6	6	"Cheating"	Marc Buckland	Ed Redlich	November 3, 1998	5.51
Ben is accused of cheating after Felicity rewrites his paper without telling him; and Julie fears she won't understand a Russian film that Zack is taking her to see.
7	7	"Drawing the Line (Part 1)"	Ellen Pressman	J. J. Abrams	November 10, 1998	4.99
Noel tires of hearing about Felicity's goings-on with Ben and forbids her to talk about it with him. Julie and Zack's relationship intensifies. Elena reveals she may be leaving school. Julie's date pushes her too far. Felicity tries to mend fences with Ben.
8	8	"Drawing the Line (Part 2)"	Joan Tewkesbury	Riley Weston	November 17, 1998	5.73
Felicity urges Julie to report the date rape and get counseling, but Julie thinks she caused the incident. Meanwhile, a prospective student (Riley Weston) visits.
9	9	"Thanksgiving"	Danny Leiner	Andrea Newman	November 24, 1998	4.90
Felicity's hurt when Noel downplays their friendship to his girlfriend, Hanna (Jennifer Garner), who's visiting for Thanksgiving but may transfer to New York. Meanwhile, Elena begrudgingly visits her dad (John Cothran, Jr.); and Ben can't locate his plane ticket.
10	10	"Finally"	Michael Fields	J. J. Abrams	December 15, 1998	4.98
Though finals and Christmas break are fast approaching, Felicity spends most of her study time literally wrapped up in Noel; and helping Ben prepare for a poetry test. Meanwhile, Sean tries to sell fruit to students in the library.
11	11	"Gimme an O!"	Tom Moore	Jennifer Levin	January 19, 1999	6.20
Felicity returns from winter break and tells Noel she wants to have sex, an endeavor that brings about much scheduling, research and preparation; Julie dreads telling Felicity about her new bond with Ben; and Elena wonders how to use a gift from Blair.
12	12	"Friends"	Todd Holland	Gina Prince-Bythewood	January 26, 1999	5.05
After Felicity thinks she spots Blair kissing someone other than Elena, she decides to blow the whistle on him – until she realizes the mystery vixen is Elena's best friend (Tammy Townsend). Meanwhile, Julie learns the identity of her birth mother (Jane Kaczmarek).
13	13	"Todd Mulcahy (Part 1)"	J. J. Abrams	J. J. Abrams	February 9, 1999	4.63
When a boy (Stephen Berra) that Felicity knew when she was 12 years old comes to town to act on feelings that he has had for her, she consults someone familiar with stalkers: Ben. She also applies for a seminar with a geneticist named Dr. McGrath (Chris Sarandon).
14	14	"Todd Mulcahy (Part 2)"	J. J. Abrams	J. J. Abrams	February 16, 1999	5.50
Todd gets hit by a bus, and as he arrives at the hospital, he gives Felicity a note she wrote years ago about being an artist. Todd almost dies, which causes Felicity to rethink her career path and blow an interview with Dr. McGrath. Also, Julie mails a tape to Carole, and Elena severs ties with Tara.
15	15	"Love and Marriage"	Todd Holland	Jennifer Levin & Andrea Newman	February 23, 1999	4.96
Felicity receives a marriage proposal from a green-card seeking Javier; and Noel gets a visit from his brother (Eddie McClintock), who shocks him with news that he's gay. Also: Ben takes up swimming.
16	16	"The Fugue"	Lawrence Trilling	J. J. Abrams & Ed Redlich	March 2, 1999	4.27
Noel is confused about his feelings for his ex (Jennifer Garner) when they reconnect after a kiss. Also: an art student (Simon Rex) who admires Felicity's work invites her to the studio; and Julie clashes with Ben's new friends from the swim team.
17	17	"Assassins"	Michael Schultz	Andrea Newman & Jennifer Levin	April 20, 1999	3.91
The morning after the fight, Noel confesses he made a "huge mistake" in going off with his ex-girlfriend and begs Felicity for another try at their relationship. Felicity struggles to tell Noel about her own indiscretion.
18	18	"Happy Birthday"	Elodie Keene	Tracy Abrams	April 27, 1999	4.28
Panicked over a surprise visit from her parents, Meghan (Amanda Foreman) entrusts Felicity with the safekeeping of her box. Meanwhile, Julie gets bombshell news about her birth mother.
19	19	"Docuventary"	Stan Salfas	J. J. Abrams	May 4, 1999	4.52
Noel and Felicity are driven to distraction when Sean (Greg Grunberg), seeking a selling angle for his documentary, latches onto their shattered relationship and pesters them to discuss their feelings on-camera.
20	20	"Connections"	Danny Leiner	Andrea Newman	May 11, 1999	4.26
Facing temporary suspension because of his unpaid tuition bill and pressure from his bookie over his gambling debts, Ben frantically sorts through his diminishing options.
21	21	"The Force"	Robert M. Williams	J. J. Abrams & Jennifer Levin	May 18, 1999	4.72
Felicity suspects one of Meghan's "spells" when finals stress is exacerbated by a series of sudden relationship mishaps, including Noel reconsidering a drive to California with her.
22	22	"Felicity Was Here"	Matt Reeves	J. J. Abrams	May 25, 1999	4.65
A disappointed Felicity faces the drive home to California without Noel, until he unexpectedly asks her to fly to Berlin with him. She accepts, but Ben's reaction makes her rethink her plans. Meanwhile, Elena's relationship with Prof. McGrath progresses along with her growing unease about the consequences of their affair.

=== Season 2 (1999–2000) ===
No. overall	No. in season	Title	Directed by	Written by	Original release date	Viewers (millions)
23	1	"Sophomoric"	Lawrence Trilling	J. J. Abrams	September 26, 1999	4.70
Felicity returns to school, after choosing to spend the summer with Ben. She becomes an R.A., just in time to deal with a student-housing shortage, living with Meghan and an arrogant new freshman, Brian Burke (Michael Peña).
24	2	"The List"	Barnet Kellman	Jennifer Levin	October 3, 1999	4.83
Felicity begins to question her values when one of her advisees seems to have better luck using tips from an article in a women's magazine. Meanwhile, Julie lightens up in a major way when she holds a blowout at Sean's.
25	3	"Ancient History"	Keith Samples	Andrea Newman	October 10, 1999	4.09
After a curriculum discussion with another student, Ruby (Amy Smart), Felicity realizes she's drawn to art rather than pre-med. Changing her courses then puts Felicity in the same class as Noel, who fears she's out to sabotage him. Meanwhile, Julie finally moves out of the loft — much to Sean's chagrin.
26	4	"The Depths"	Michael Schultz	J. J. Abrams	October 17, 1999	3.83
Ugly truths surface when Felicity and Julie air their grievances while trapped underground in a stalled subway train. Meanwhile, Noel and Ruby drift into a first date when Felicity fails to meet them at the museum and Ben clashes with a cranky customer (Teri Polo).
27	5	"Crash"	Robert M. Williams	Josh Reims	October 24, 1999	3.46
When Julie suggests that dating B-list people is a good way to get over her breakup with Ben, Felicity agrees to Prof. Sherman's request to try dating her son David (Henri Lubatti). Meanwhile, Ben and Maggie (Teri Polo) shift to a more intimate relationship despite her concerns over their age gap; and Noel and Elena become obsessed with a video game.
28	6	"The Love Bug"	Lawrence Trilling	Paul Guyot & J. J. Abrams	November 7, 1999	3.27
When Meghan gets mono, Felicity bunks with Noel and Elena, and faces an awkward situation when he asks her to keep their past relationship a secret from Ruby — who later comes to Felicity for advice on birth control. Meanwhile, Felicity frets over David's failure to become more intimate.
29	7	"Getting Lucky"	Dan Appel	Jennifer Levin	November 14, 1999	3.56
Felicity is stunned when Noel and Elena point out that her affection for her adopted stray dog Lucky is interfering with her relationship with David, who is rapidly losing patience with her. Meanwhile, Maggie gives Ben an ultimatum: spend the night with her at the Dakota Hotel or she's out of his life forever.
30	8	"Family Affairs"	Ken Olin	Andrea Newman	November 21, 1999	3.35
Felicity's parents (Eve Gordon, Erich Anderson) upset her holiday plans by surprising her with a Thanksgiving visit that results in a tense dinner at Elena and Noel's. Among the dinner guests are Felicity's new beau, David, and his mother, Prof. Sherman (Sally Kirkland). Meanwhile, Ben agrees to work at a charity event that Maggie is catering for her husband (David Starzyk).
31	9	"Portraits"	Lawrence Trilling	Jed Seidel	December 19, 1999	3.43
Felicity is having weird dreams about Noel that make her realize she wants him back — but she also doesn't want to jeopardize his budding relationship with Ruby. Meanwhile, Julie gets an offer for a demo deal from a record label executive (Adam Rodriguez) who Sean believes just wants to get her into bed, and Ben agonizes over his English Literature final.
32	10	"Great Expectations"	Keith Samples	Josh Reims	January 16, 2000	3.15
Felicity fumes when a medical conference gives her dad an excuse to visit her for two weeks. Meanwhile, Julie gets her demo deal, along with further advances from Erik (Adam Rodriguez); Ben rethinks the advice Sean gave him about dating Felicity; and Noel is off to an awkward start as a teaching assistant.
33	11	"Help for the Lovelorn"	Lamont Johnson	J. J. Abrams	January 23, 2000	2.34
Former Twilight Zone director Lamont Johnson helms this tribute to the sci-fi series, in which a lovelorn Felicity visits a mysterious clinic that promises to heal her broken heart. However, no one will tell her what the cure actually entails, despite repeated requests, so she bolts before her examination is done — only to learn later that the treatment has already begun.
34	12	"The Slump"	Matt Reeves	J. J. Abrams	February 6, 2000	3.18
Felicity is pushed to unravel her tortured feelings over her parents' breakup during mandatory sessions with a counselor (Amy Aquino), part of Felicity's punishment for drinking underage and breaking into the university swimming pool with Ben. Meanwhile, Elena is distracted by her hunky new lab partner and Ben balks at seeing the counselor, despite the threat of expulsion.
35	13	"Truth and Consequences"	Robert M. Williams, Jr.	Paul Guyot	February 13, 2000	3.74
Noel and Ruby anxiously await the results of a home-pregnancy test; Felicity and Ben begin their community service at the university clinic under the direction of an arrogant boss (Chris Martin) who especially irritates Ben; and Julie's demo deal meets opposition from Erik's boss (Bruce Nozick).
36	14	"True Colors"	Ken Olin	Lawrence Trilling	February 20, 2000	3.15
Noel confesses to Ruby that he'd rather disappear than deal with her pregnancy, then seeks counsel from Ben, who shares details of a similar experience he had in high school. Meanwhile, Felicity's clinic boss tries to goad her into quitting during a clash over missing patient files.
37	15	"Things Change"	Elodie Keene	Andrea Newman	February 27, 2000	2.90
Felicity is stunned when a visit with her dad reveals that he's taking antianxiety pills. Nevertheless, she needs him to fill in at the clinic, as the facility must have a doctor to pass the annual state review. Meanwhile, Noel and Ruby come to a decision about their future; and Elena's competitive streak is ignited when Tracy (Donald Faison) outscores her on an exam.
38	16	"Revolutions"	Barnet Kellman	Lynn Cantor & Mitch Salem	April 5, 2000	3.08
When clinic policy forces her to decline a patient's request for the morning-after pill, Felicity organizes a sit-in that could jeopardize a medical-school recommendation for her boss, Greg (Chris William Martin), and upset her already shaky academic standing. Meanwhile, Noel's tutoring session with Ben comes unglued and a cable channel shows interest in Sean's documentary.
39	17	"Docuventary II"	Stan Salfas	J. J. Abrams & Tracy Abrams	April 12, 2000	3.29
As Sean films his pals' love lives for a second time, Ben tries to field Sean's queries while masking resentment at Felicity's attraction to Greg and dealing with his own unresolved feelings for her. Meanwhile, Felicity applies to become Greg's paid assistant; Noel stresses about losing midterms he has yet to grade; and Tracy deliberately provokes Elena.
40	18	"Party Lines"	Joanna Lovetti	Jennifer Levin	April 19, 2000	2.34
Greg asks Felicity to run his student-council president campaign and she agrees — until she realizes she hates his politics. Meanwhile, Ben gets an internship with a stockbroker (Alex Carter), who uses him as a glorified baby-sitter for his sullen son (Jesse James). And Elena and Felicity push Noel and Julie into going to a school dance as a couple.
41	19	"Running Mates"	Robert M. Williams, Jr.	Josh Reims	April 26, 2000	3.14
Ben thinks Greg's friend is vandalizing Felicity's campaign posters and urges her to reveal Greg's past arrest. But Greg denies any wrongdoing, and Felicity refuses to believe Ben or start personal attacks. Meanwhile, Ruby tells Noel she hasn't told the baby's father that she's pregnant, and Tracy upsets Elena when he bails in the middle of a make-out session.
42	20	"Ben Was Here"	Lawrence Trilling	J. J. Abrams	May 3, 2000	3.25
Ben follows Greg and Felicity on their weekend getaway to tell Felicity he loves her, but before he can speak she lambasts him for exposing Greg's past drug use and slams the door on him. Meanwhile, a ruptured pipe floods the dorms, forcing the students to bunk in the cafeteria. And Noel and Elena's apartment is left unlivable by Tracy's toxic attempt to remove the wallpaper.
43	21	"The Aretha Theory"	Jack Bender	Andrea Newman	May 10, 2000	2.94
After yet another interrupted date, Greg realizes Felicity is still not over Ben and dumps her. A depressed Felicity asks Meghan for a night on the town. Meanwhile, Julie tries to figure out how she feels about Sean after his declaration of love; Elena finds herself flirting with a friend of Tracy's; and Ben helps Javier shop for an engagement ring for Samuel.
44	22	"Final Answer"	Randall Zisk	Jennifer Levin & Josh Reims	May 17, 2000	2.90
Ben and Felicity's plans to spend the summer together in California are jeopardized when her professor offers her an internship in New York — if she does well on the final. Tracy decides he wants to have sex with Elena after all, and Ruby tells Noel that Wade asked her to marry him. Meanwhile, Sean asks Julie out on a date and Julie says yes, even though she's still wrestling with an attraction to Noel.
45	23	"The Biggest Deal There Is"	Jack Bender	J. J. Abrams	May 24, 2000	3.36
Felicity must choose between a prestigious New York internship or a California summer with Ben; Javier prepares to wed Samuel; and Julie faces the return of her birth mother (Jane Kaczmarek). Elsewhere, Noel is smitten with Javier's cousin, Natalie (Ali Landry), and Sean courts a surly Meghan.

=== Season 3 (2000–2001) ===
No. overall	No. in season	Title	Directed by	Written by	Original release date	Viewers (millions)
46	1	"The Christening"	Steve Miner	J. J. Abrams	October 4, 2000	3.52
Felicity returns from summer break and ditches plans to spend her junior year in an apartment with Elena and Julie. Instead, she decides to get a Brooklyn flat for herself and Ben, who foolishly agrees to live with her before seeing the dump. Meanwhile, Javier registers for freshman year; Sean expands his "Docu-ventary" into a reality series; and Noel remains missing in action — along with Javier's cousin Natalie (Ali Landry).
47	2	"The Anti-Natalie Intervention"	Jack Bender	Jennifer Levin	October 11, 2000	4.98
Noel's unexpected announcement prompts Felicity and friends to stage an intervention. Meanwhile, Ben's prodigal dad (John Ritter) is in town seeking reconciliation with his son; Elena gets frustrated with Tracy's ban on sex and responds to a sexy student's invitation by telling him she doesn't have a boyfriend.
48	3	"Hello, I Must Be Going"	Lou Antonio	Josh Reims	October 18, 2000	3.58
Ben's mother calls with disturbing news that he refuses to share with Felicity. She becomes even more upset when Ben opens up to ex-girlfriend Julie, who is struggling with family issues of her own. Meanwhile, Noel goes forward with his plans until Natalie throws him a curve; a new roommate moves in; and Sean is hurt when he thinks Meghan doesn't like his nose.
49	4	"Greeks and Geeks"	Lawrence Trilling	Terri Treas & Michael Zand	October 25, 2000	3.83
Noel corrals Tracy into helping him sharpen his PC skills to impress the college's computer-center manager (Matt Doherty) into giving him a job. Meanwhile, Meghan takes a depressed Felicity to a frat party after arguing with Sean over her new phone-sex job. And Ben preps a nervous Javier for his citizenship test.
50	5	"Surprise"	Harry Winer	Julie Blumberg & Joy Gregory	November 1, 2000	3.84
As Ben makes plans to celebrate her birthday, Felicity wrestles with the aftereffects of a wild night out. Meanwhile, Sean discovers a potentially serious medical problem when he goes to the doctor (Jim Jansen), but he won't take the appropriate test or tell Meghan. And Noel gets his first computer-emergency call, which leads to an unhappy surprise.
51	6	"One Ball, Two Strikes"	Tony Bill	J. J. Abrams	November 8, 2000	4.82
Noel tells Richard that he knows what his secret is, but he might not be as accurate as he thinks. Sean learns that his medical condition is more serious than he realized. Elsewhere, Felicity asks Randy to confirm her story to Ben that nothing happened between them, and Elena has an embarrassing encounter with Finn. Tyra Banks guest stars.
52	7	"Kissing Mr. Covington"	Harry Winer	Jennifer Levin	November 15, 2000	3.90
Ben's father (John Ritter), who comes back to town seeking a reconciliation with his son, ends up kissing Felicity in a moment of emotional weakness. Elsewhere, Sean converts to Judaism after his operation; Tracy asks Elena to join him and Finn for a celebratory outing; and Noel reads Jane's private e-mail.
53	8	"A Good Egg"	Keith Samples	John Eisendrath	November 22, 2000	3.66
After spending time with his infant nephew, Javier decides to have a child and asks Felicity to donate an egg that his aunt would carry to term for him and his male partner. Noel tries to kiss Jane (Tyra Banks) and discovers that her heart is set on another man.
54	9	"James and the Giant Piece"	Harry Winer	Josh Reims	November 29, 2000	3.90
Ben is concerned for Molly (Sarah-Jane Potts) and Felicity's safety after Molly says that she is still struggling with her addiction. Elena is questioned about her affair with Professor McGrath by a school administrator. Elsewhere, Meghan tells Sean that her life has become boring and heads out to a nightclub.
55	10	"Let's Get It On" "Final Touches"	Lawrence Trilling	Terri Treas & Michael Zand	December 6, 2000	3.31
In the next three days, Felicity must prepare for a final for a class she thought she dropped and help Noel complete an extensive computer project. Meanwhile, Molly apologizes to Felicity and Ben for yelling at them when she moved out, but James (Eddie Cahill) scolds her when he sees the group talking. Tracy and Elena decide to renew their friendship.
56	11	"And to All a Good Night"	Stephen Gyllenhaal	Teleplay by : Jennifer Levin & Josh Reims; Story by : Julie Blumberg & Joy Gregory	December 13, 2000	4.41
Felicity's mother visits with plans for a theater outing with her daughter. Sean and Richard buy Christmas trees to sell during the holidays, but the deal proves more challenging than they thought and puts Ben in an awkward situation with his girlfriend's mother. Elsewhere, Tracy tells Elena that he has been accepted to a medical program in Africa and that the start date is in three weeks. Molly's ex-boyfriend interrupts the festivities.
57	12	"Girlfight"	Lawrence Trilling	Jennifer Levin	April 18, 2001	4.96
The collegiate drama picks up with the aftermath of the shots fired at the Christmas party by Molly's ex, James. The unfolding days and months reveal how the incident affects the friends in different ways as the survivors come to grips with their experience. Avery (Kristin Lehman) feels a bond with Ben after he helps to save her life.
58	13	"Blackout"	Barnet Kellman	Josh Reims	April 25, 2001	3.09
A power outage interrupts Sean's presentation of a film he planned to share with his friends, and Noel tells Felicity that a Seattle Internet company is interested in meeting with him about their "Loser Pet Store" program. Meanwhile, Meghan is visited by a gal pal with whom she once had an intimate encounter.
59	14	"The Break-up Kit"	Harry Winer	Terri Treas & Michael Zand	May 2, 2001	3.40
Ben's uncertainty about his relationship with Felicity is intensified when Avery extends an invitation to a weekend getaway in Southampton. Meanwhile, Molly returns to New York after a stay in a rehab center and she inadvertently injures Elena's eyes while giving her friend a mud facial. While injured Elena develops a crush fellow med student, DeForrest (Kenan Thompson). A skeptical Sean joins Meghan in a seance to contact her deceased dog.
60	15	"Senioritis"	Keith Samples	John Eisendrath & Jennifer Levin & Josh Reims	May 9, 2001	3.81
Noel is offered a job with a computer company based in Seattle, and Ben gets a phone call from a girl who tells him that Avery was rushed to the emergency room. Meanwhile, Sean tells Meghan that he wants to have a bar mitzvah to make up for not having the ceremony when he was younger.
61	16	"It's Raining Men"	Lawrence Trilling	John Eisendrath & Jennifer Levin & Josh Reims	May 16, 2001	3.89
Chest pains force Javier to spend a few days in the hospital, and he leaves Felicity in charge of the coffee shop during finals. Sean and Meghan see a counselor (Teri Garr) to discuss their relationship. Meanwhile, Elena tries to mend fences with DeForrest.
62	17	"The Last Summer Ever"	Tony Bill	Jennifer Levin & Josh Reims	May 23, 2001	3.86
The third season concludes as Noel prepares for graduation and a new job in Seattle. With his departure imminent, Felicity struggles to accept that their friendship may be over. Meanwhile, Ben gets a letter that casts doubt on his summer plans with Felicity; and Sean and Meghan argue over where to spend their summer break.

=== Season 4 (2001–2002) ===
No. overall	No. in season	Title	Directed by	Written by	Original release date	Viewers (millions)
63	1	"The Declaration"	Matt Reeves	J. J. Abrams	October 10, 2001	3.65
After a carefree, platonic summer with unlikely roommate Noel, the fourth-season premiere brings a reality check for Felicity. The collegiate faces the agonizing realization that the real world is only one school year away. The pressure of not having her future planned out is compounded by a visit from her unsympathetic father, who fears Felicity isn't taking her life seriously. On the flip side, Ben's back in town with newfound direction — he's determined to go to medical school. Meanwhile, bride-to-be Elena and wedding planner Javier tussle over her upcoming nuptials, while groom Tracy figures into Meghan's fantasies, sparking Sean's jealousy.
64	2	"My Best Friend's Wedding"	Harry Winer	James Duff	October 17, 2001	4.09
Wrought with guilt over her momentary lapse of reason with Noel, Felicity weighs her only two options — to tell Ben, or not to tell Ben. And her strange behavior doesn't go unnoticed by her boyfriend. Meanwhile, Elena reacts unpredictably to her husband-to-be's sudden interest in sex; and Meghan and Sean make a bet involving a Meghan-Tracy lip lock.
65	3	"Your Money or Your Wife"	Lawrence Trilling	Edward Kitsis & Adam Horowitz	October 24, 2001	3.6
Sean, who's stressed out by money-related woes, ruins the dinner Meghan planned for the two of them and their parents by feuding with his father. Also, Felicity tells Javier about Noel (who's considering moving out of the loft) and attempts to patch things up with Ben, who is concerned about his chances of completing medical school.
66	4	"Miss Conception"	Keith Samples	Laurie McCarthy & Josh Reims	October 31, 2001	3.45
As Felicity reluctantly gears up for her beauty-pageant debut, something else that could severely impact her life comes to light—a home-pregnancy test is positive. Noel, meanwhile, decides to take a job as a guidance counselor at his alma mater—which also makes him Ben's counselor.
67	5	"Boooz"	Stan Salfas	Julie Blumberg & Joy Gregory	November 7, 2001	2.79
After getting kicked out of organic chemistry, Ben and his lab partner (Christopher Gorham) drown their misery in booze. Meanwhile, Javier and Noel go to a Lionel Richie concert (the singer appears as himself); and Felicity's students chastise their TA for her participation in a beauty pageant.
68	6	"Oops... Noel Did It Again"	Craig Zisk	Jennifer Levin & Josh Reims	November 14, 2001	3.5
Diagnosed with liver failure, Ben's father asks his son to assume power of attorney. Meanwhile, Noel causes two flaky freshmen to move into Felicity and Elena's apartment – a living arrangement that is anything but amicable. Felicity also worries that the professor for whom she is a TA is interested in her romantically.
69	7	"The Storm"	Harry Winer	Jessica Queller	November 21, 2001	2.91
The fallout from Ben's discovery of Noel and Felicity's one-night stand continues to torment the members of the lamentable love triangle. Ben, already overwhelmed by school, his father's liver failure and a visit from his mother (Dee Wallace Stone), can barely look at Felicity, much less discuss her transgressions. Conversely, the one thing on Felicity's mind is to talk about what happened with her unreceptive boyfriend. Noel, meanwhile, feels alienated from his friends and finds some comfort in a co-worker (Sarah Jane Morris), who also happens to be his new boss's daughter.
70	8	"The Last Thanksgiving"	David Petrarca	Josh Reims	November 28, 2001	3.14
A big Thanksgiving dinner at the gals' apartment ends up being more than a little uncomfortable for everyone when Ben brings Lauren (Lisa Edelstein) along as his date. The only one not there is Noel, whose defensive behavior ruins plans for a holiday dinner with his brother. Instead, Noel finds himself sharing a hotel room with a woman he met in a bar.
71	9	"Moving On"	Lawrence Trilling	Edward Kitsis & Adam Horowitz	December 5, 2001	2.86
Ben tells Felicity he wants to move on, but Javier stubbornly attempts to trick Felicity and her ex into seeing a play together. What no one realizes is that Ben is interested in Lauren. Meanwhile, Noel's meeting with a therapist leads him to question his own mental stability, and Elena encourages Felicity to date a fellow art TA.
72	10	"Fire"	Joanna Kerns	Laurie McCarthy	December 12, 2001	3.24
Noel looks into starting his own business and resolves to distance himself from Felicity, but an emergency at school brings them together in spite of their personal troubles. Meanwhile, Felicity finds new direction of her own in an art project; Ben becomes more studious than ever; and Meghan learns that her visiting teenage sister (Kala Savage) is pregnant.
73	11	"A Perfect Match"	Lawrence Trilling	Julie Blumberg & Joy Gregory	December 19, 2001	3.18
The collegiate drama's winter hiatus is preceded by a fateful storm. Thanks to the weather, which delays her flight home for the holidays, Ben manages to catch Felicity in time to tell her he wants to get back together. Felicity embraces the idea without hesitation, but Ben has one more bridge to cross before he can fully focus on their relationship: The snowfall has also delayed the arrival of his father's donor liver, and Ben must weigh the consequences of letting his mother donate part of her own. Meanwhile, Noel and Sean embark on a joint business venture.
74	12	"Future Shock"	Keith Samples	Josh Reims	March 20, 2002	2.80
The collegiate drama ends its winter hiatus and kicks off the second half of its fourth and final season. Last December there was no cliffhanger ending, and Felicity and Ben apparently were back on track with their relationship. All that may change when Lauren comes to Ben with some shocking news. Noel also revisits a past fling when he has a chance encounter with Zoe Webb (Sarah Jane Morris). Meanwhile, a frustrated Felicity gets little support from her mother when she starts pounding the pavement with Owen in an effort to get her art into galleries.
75	13	"Kiss and Tell"	Stan Salfas	Josh Reims & Laurie McCarthy	March 27, 2002	2.67
Ben breaks the news that Lauren is pregnant. His father voices a different opinion on the role Ben should play in the child's upbringing. As that development sinks in, Felicity tests out a potential new career path. Meanwhile, working with Zoe causes Noel some undue stress; and differing priorities cause some mutual annoyance between Sean and Meghan.
76	14	"Raising in Arizona"	Harry Winer	Andrea Newman	April 3, 2002	3.17
Felicity and Ben's seemingly endless roller-coaster ride of a relationship encounters yet another loop. Lauren tells Ben that she intends to raise their child in Arizona, threatening to upset the newly dedicated father-to-be's plans for medical school and his future with Felicity. Unfortunately, Felicity learns of this latest development secondhand, when Noel innocently relays an answering-machine message regarding Ben's possible school transfer. Shaken by the news, Felicity talks to her confidant Noel about the pregnancy — and inadvertently angers Ben, who suspects that Noel still has feelings for Felicity.
77	15	"The Paper Chase"	Craig Zisk	Alex Taub & Jennifer Levin	April 10, 2002	3.67
Sidetracked by her redefined love life and career path, Felicity lets a big paper for her art-history class go until the last minute. Frustrated and desperate, she resorts to plagiarism (and immediately regrets the decision). An ultrasound reveals the sex of Ben and Lauren's child, and the father-to-be considers hiring a lawyer to stop Lauren from moving to Arizona. Meanwhile, Noel's boss expresses his disapproval of Sean's behavior; and Javier fears that Rita's new boyfriend (Michael B. Silver) is gay.
78	16	"Ben Don't Leave"	Harry Winer	Laurie McCarthy & Alex Taub	April 17, 2002	2.4
Ben is badly injured in a car accident when a drunken Laura crashed the car, and his prognosis is unsure. When Felicity learns that Lauren (who had earlier castigated her and Ben for being "selfish") is planning to just leave for Arizona anyway, she lambastes Lauren's own selfishness and stupidity and tells her that she feels sorry for her unborn child. Lauren does leave town, but not before admitting to Felicity that the damage she has done are entirely her fault and her problems, and resolving to get sober in Arizona. Meanwhile, Noel's rocky relationship with Zoe continues without the complications of intimacy; Richard asks Elena out for the sole purpose of impressing another woman; and Felicity's plagiarized and soon-to-be published paper still hangs over her head.
79	17	"The Graduate"	Scott Foley	Josh Reims & Jennifer Levin	April 24, 2002	3.10
An occasion four years in the making, graduation day arrives for Felicity. But the occasion competes with Ben's marriage proposal. Both momentous events should be thrilling milestones, were it not for Felicity's uncertain professional future, her parents' disapproval of the engagement and the birth of the child her new fiancé fathered with another woman. Commencement, it would seem, is the least of Felicity's concerns. With Ben dedicated to living near his son in Arizona, Felicity faces a heartbreaking dilemma – follow Ben across the country (as she has done before), or live her own life, alone.
80	18	"Time Will Tell"	Harry Winer	Laurie McCarthy & Josh Reims	May 1, 2002	2.84
An episode taking place in the near future after Felicity's graduation brings with it a number of surprises. Among them, the death of a character; a big breakup; a wedding; magic spells; and, believe it or not, time travel back to the beginning of Felicity's senior year of college.
81	19	"The Power of the Ex"	Lawrence Trilling	Alex Taub	May 8, 2002	3.22
Felicity realizes that the changes around her affect more than just her dating situation. Part of the ripple effect is Noel's encounter with his ex Hanna (Jennifer Garner), and Felicity fears the implications of their rediscovered relationship. Meanwhile, since Sean and Meghan don't marry in this alternate universe, he considers dating someone else. Also, Elena serves as Javier's unlikely acting coach, and Felicity gets a surprise when she goes premed.
82	20	"Spin the Bottle"	Harry Winer	Joy Gregory	May 15, 2002	3.50
In an episode keeping with Felicity's recent trip back in time to be with Noel instead of Ben, original cast member Amy Jo Johnson returns as soulful musician Julie Emrick. In town for an audition, the gang's old pal (and Ben's ex-girlfriend) winds up being swept into the maelstrom of the group's already tumultuous relationships. First, Sean learns that perhaps breaking up with Meghan in order to be with Julie was not the best idea. Then, both he and Felicity are taken by surprise when Julie and Ben start dating again. All this, plus Felicity's efforts to prove to Ben that she's over him lead to one very uncomfortable night out.
83	21	"Felicity Interrupted"	Joanna Kerns	Josh Reims & Jennifer Levin	May 22, 2002	3.68
Felicity and company graduated weeks ago, and in recent episodes she magically traveled back in time to secure her romantic future with Noel, rather than Ben. The new pairing does come to pass, but Noel senses the forced nature of their relationship. And, despite knowing that Ben will cheat on her, Felicity cannot deny her feelings for him.
84	22	"Back to the Future"	Lawrence Trilling	Jennifer Levin & Josh Reims	May 22, 2002	3.68
Which one is the man for her? The question the series has posed time and again is finally answered as Felicity finally chooses Ben in her alternate future, making her wake up from a fevered sleep in the present on the day of Noel's wedding, only to tell present Ben that he is the one she wants to be with. And the story comes full circle as the friends celebrate at Noel's reception.
