= Michele Morgan (actress) =

American actress (born 1970)

- Born: Tanisha Michele Morgan; 1970 (age 55–56); United States
- Occupation: Actress
- Years active: 1991–present
- Spouse: Tobias Truvillion (m. 2012)

Tanisha Michele Morgan (born 1970) is an American actress who was part of the rap group BWP from 1989 to 1994. BWP made a cameo appearance in the 1992 romance comedy film Strictly Business. She later appeared in the films New Jersey Drive (1995), Bulworth (1998), and The Other Brother (2002). From 1996 to 1997, she had a recurring role in the NBC medical drama series ER as Allison Beaumont. She also made guest appearances on The Steve Harvey Show, Girlfriends, and NYPD Blue.

Morgan starred in the 2002 Geffen Playhouse's production of the musical Pearl by Debbie Allen.

== Filmography ==
=== Film ===
Year	Film	Role	Notes
1991	Strictly Business	Uptown Girl No. 2	Film debut
1995	New Jersey Drive	Coreen	
1998	Bulworth	Cheryl	
2002	The Other Brother	Bobbi	

=== Television ===
Year	Title	Role	Notes
1997–1998	ER	Allison Beaumont	6 episodes
1999–2001	The PJs	"Juicy" Hudson (voice)	41 episodes
2000	The Steve Harvey Show	Laverne	Episode: "Black Streak"
2000	Girlfriends	Woman at Club	Episode: "Girlfrenzy"
2000–2004	Static Shock	Sharon Hawkins, Mother (voice)	25 episodes
2002	NYPD Blue	Cheryl Johnson	Episode: "Here Comes the Son"
2006	The Boondocks	Rosa Parks (voice)	2 episodes

=== Video games ===
Year	Title	Voice role	Notes
2003	Gladius	Various	
2006	The Ant Bully	Generic Ant	

== Discography ==
Album information
The Bytches
- Released: February 19, 1991
- Chart positions: #34 Top R&B/Hip-Hop
- Last RIAA certification: Gold
- Singles: "Two Minute Brother", "We Want Money"
