= The 24th Day =

2004 film by Tony Piccirillo

- DVD release cover
- Directed by: Tony Piccirillo
- Written by: Tony Piccirillo
- Based on: The 24th Day by Tony Piccirillo
- Produced by: Nick Stagliano
- Starring: James Marsden; Scott Speedman
- Cinematography: J. Alan Hostetter
- Edited by: Aaron Mackof
- Music by: Kevin Manthei
- Production companies: Nazz Productions; Big Teddy Films
- Distributed by: Screen Media Films
- Release dates: May 6, 2004 (Tribeca); May 14, 2004
- Running time: 96 minutes
- Country: United States
- Language: English

The 24th Day is a 2004 American drama film written and directed by Tony Piccirillo, based on his play of the same name. The film stars James Marsden and Scott Speedman. It premiered at the Tribeca Film Festival on May 6, 2004.

== Plot ==
Tom (Scott Speedman) and Dan (James Marsden) meet in a bar and then proceed to Tom's apartment together. While there, Dan realizes that he had been in that same apartment before. Five years earlier, Dan and Tom had a one night stand there. According to Tom, that encounter with Dan was his first and only homosexual experience. Some years later, Tom's wife is found to be HIV positive. Despondent after receiving this diagnosis from her doctor, she drives through a red traffic light and is killed in an ensuing collision.

Subsequent to these events, medical tests reveal that Tom is also HIV positive. Tom blames himself for passing HIV on to his wife and, in turn, he blames Dan for passing the virus on to him. Reasoning that Dan, ultimately, is to blame for his wife's death, Tom devises a plan to exact revenge. He holds Dan hostage, keeping him bound and gagged to a chair in his apartment. He draws blood from Dan in order to conduct a test to determine Dan's HIV status. If Dan's test results are positive for HIV, Tom vows to kill Dan. If the results are negative, Tom agrees to release Dan unharmed.

In the end, Tom returns to the apartment and lets Dan go. As Dan is leaving, Tom asks him when he had last been tested. A few moments later, he reveals that Dan's test was, in fact, positive. He decided to let Dan go because he realized that his positive status was the result of his choices which he couldn't blame on anyone else. The screen fades with Dan standing in Tom's doorway in shock.

== Cast ==
- James Marsden as Dan
- Scott Speedman as Tom
- Sofía Vergara as Isabella
- Barry Papick as Mr. Lerner
- Charlie Corrado as Officer #1
- Jarvis W. George as Officer #2
- Scott Roman as The Bartender
- Jeffrey Frost as Dan's Assistant
- Jona Harvey as Marla
- Thea Chaloner as Wife
- Brian Campbell as "Blondie"
- Zach The Dog as Lerner's Dog

== Release ==
The film had its world premiere at the 3rd Tribeca Film Festival on May 6, 2004. It was released in limited theaters in the United States on May 14, 2004, and on DVD on August 31, 2004.

== Reception ==
On Rotten Tomatoes, The 24th Day holds an approval rating of 27% based on 15 reviews, with an average rating of 4.30/10. On Metacritic, the film has a weighted average score of 29/100 based on 6 critics, indicating "generally unfavorable reviews". Robert Koehler of Variety wrote that "the movie is never more than a hesitantly filmed recording of the play".
