= The Other Brother =

- Directed by: Mandel Holland
- Written by: Mandel Holland
- Produced by: Mandel Holland
- Starring: Mekhi Phifer; Andre Blake; Michele Morgan; Tangi Miller
- Cinematography: Matthew Clark
- Edited by: Anna Celada
- Production company: Delflix Pictures
- Distributed by: Xenon Pictures
- Release date: April 24, 2002 (Los Angeles)
- Running time: 94 minutes
- Country: United States
- Language: English

The Other Brother is a 2002 American comedy-drama film written and directed by Mandel Holland and starring Mekhi Phifer, Andre Blake, Michele Morgan and Tangi Miller.

== Cast ==
- Mekhi Phifer as Martin
- Tangi Miller as Paula
- Andre Blake as Junnie
- Michele Morgan as Bobbi
- Ebony Jo-Ann as Mother Pearl

== Release ==
The film was released on April 24, 2002, in Los Angeles and on April 26, 2002, in Manhattan.

== Reception ==
The film has a 33% rating on Rotten Tomatoes based on six reviews.

Kevin Thomas of the Los Angeles Times gave the film a positive review, calling it "a perfectly pleasant if slightly pokey comedy..."

Dave Kehr of The New York Times also gave the film a positive review, calling it "a sweet-tempered comedy that forgoes the knee-jerk misogyny that passes for humor in so many teenage comedies..."
