= The PJs =

1999 American adult animated stop-motion black sitcom

- Genre: Animated sitcom; Adult animation; Black sitcom; Stop motion
- Created by: Eddie Murphy; Larry Wilmore; Steve Tompkins
- Voices of: Eddie Murphy; Phil Morris; Loretta Devine; Ja'net Dubois; Kevin Michael Richardson; Jenifer Lewis; Pepe Serna; Michele Morgan
- Theme music composer: George Clinton; Quincy Jones III
- Composer: Marc Bonilla
- Country of origin: United States
- Original language: English
- No. of seasons: 3
- No. of episodes: 43 (list of episodes)

Production
- Executive producers: Eddie Murphy; Larry Wilmore; Steve Tompkins; Will Vinton; Ron Howard; Brian Grazer; Tony Krantz
- Producers: J. Michael Mendel; Mary Sandell
- Cinematography: Tim McGilvrey (season 1); Eric Adkins (seasons 2–3)
- Running time: 22 minutes
- Production companies: Imagine Television; The Murphy Company; Will Vinton Studios; Touchstone Television (seasons 1–2); Warner Bros. Television (season 3)

Original release
- Network: Fox
- Release: January 10, 1999 – September 5, 2000
- Network: The WB
- Release: October 8, 2000 – May 20, 2001

The PJs is an American adult stop motion-animated Black sitcom created by Eddie Murphy, Larry Wilmore, and Steve Tompkins for Fox. Murphy also starred in the series, and it was produced by Ron Howard and Brian Grazer for Imagine Television, The Murphy Company, Will Vinton Studios, Touchstone Television in its first two seasons (thus marking the show as Disney's first adult animated series), and Warner Bros. Television in its third and final season. The original run of the series debuted on Fox on January 10, 1999. On January 12, the second episode aired in its regular Tuesday night time slot, following King of the Hill. The series was moved to The WB for its third season and the series ended on May 20, 2001. The series portrays life in an urban public housing project. The show's title is an abbreviation for "the projects", referring to the show's public housing highrise.

== Production and release ==
"Once upon a time in the projects!"

— George Clinton

43 episodes aired during the show's run of 2 years and 4 months. Each took over 2 months to produce, owing to the laborious stop-motion process.

While co-creator Eddie Murphy is credited as the voice of Thurgood Stubbs on every episode, actor Phil Morris says that in some episodes, he provided the voice of Thurgood; according to Morris, Murphy did not want to show up on some days to record the voice of Thurgood Stubbs, so the producers hired Morris to record Thurgood's lines, where he worked in a separate booth from the other actors, allowing the producers to replace Morris' recordings with Murphy's voice in case Murphy decided he wanted to record his dialogue.

After two seasons on Fox, the show moved to The WB in 2000. Its high budget and declining ratings led to its cancellation in 2001; the final 2 episodes remained unaired until 2003. The show aired in syndication for a time on Trio, Fuse, MTV2, and Adult Swim. As of 2020, the series is no longer syndicated by other television networks, but is occasionally shown on the ad-supported video on demand service Pluto TV, specifically on the service's Kevin Hart's Laugh Out Loud! Network and the entire series is available for viewing on NBCUniversal's streaming service Peacock.

The PJs won 3 Emmy Awards and one Annie Award during its run. Quincy Jones' son QD3, along with George Clinton, produced the theme music for the show.

== Characters ==
Portrait of most of the major characters

- Thurgood Orenthal Stubbs (also known as The Super or simply Super) (voiced by Eddie Murphy in most episodes, Phil Morris in later episodes, understudied by Mark Moseley) – The superintendent of the Hilton-Jacobs projects and the main protagonist. Although he means well, Thurgood is short-tempered, impatient, not very bright, and has a variety of health issues. He wears a white short-sleeved shirt, blue overalls, and brown shoes. He also has salt and pepper hair worn in a tall style akin to Don King. Thurgood originally had a black afro, but an accident on his wedding day transformed his hairstyle to its current state. Thurgood is terrified of black rats as revealed in "Fear of a Black Rat". Much of the show's humor is derived from Thurgood's unwillingness to repair the dilapidated projects or deal with the many frustrations of leading a community of the urban poor. Despite his laughably poor education, he is shown to be kind and a natural leader when the situation calls for it. His diet is another source of humor, as he prefers fried foods, red meat, and Forties, which is the likely cause of his big belly and other health issues he complains of such as angina. Thurgood throughout the series has used a variety of interjections in reference to African-American icons. Such interjections are "What on Eartha Kitt?", or "Mother Marion Barry!". He reacts to surprising or frightening events with the interjection "Ut!". Thurgood also makes a background appearance in The Simpsons episode "Missionary: Impossible" as a telethon volunteer along with characters of other Fox TV shows, as well as on a manhole cover in the Futurama episodes, "I Second That Emotion" and "The Luck of the Fryish". In response, The PJs episode "Cliffhangin' with Mr. Super" featured Futurama character Philip J. Fry on a missing person poster on a milk carton.
- Muriel Stubbs (née Warren) (voiced by Loretta Devine) – Thurgood's loving wife and the show's voice of reason. She wears a pink sweatsuit with the word "Paris" on it (which she got on a trip to Paris with Don King) and pastel pink shoes. Muriel has a sister named Bebe Ho who is married to another tenant. Muriel and Bebe were likely raised in Alabama during the era of school desegregation, as evidenced by Muriel's having met her state's governor when she attended an all-white high school. However, Muriel attests that the only reason she got to meet the governor was because he was blocking the school door.
- Florence Normandie Avery (Mrs. Avery) (voiced by Ja'net Dubois) – A grouchy senior citizen who bullies Thurgood throughout the series. She, like the other tenants, hates him with a passion because he never fixes her run-down apartment. A retired con artist, Mrs. Avery often tells random and inappropriate stories of her past as a grifter. She has numerous ailments and has had multiple strokes. Florence keeps a loaded shotgun with her named "Mrs. Jones", which she used to shoot Thurgood, the garbage man, the mailman, and a helicopter as well as using it as a general threat to get her way. It was later revealed she had not become impaired by the fall in the elevator shaft, but was lonely and seeking companionship.
  - Lucky – Mrs. Avery's beloved pet dog that is seen in a lot of episodes. He got his name from being shot three times by Mrs. Avery's shotgun, one time because Thurgood let him in, and then two more times to be sure he is lucky. Thurgood gave Lucky to Mrs. Avery to get out of taking care of her after he caused her to fall down an elevator shaft. Lucky is probably the only living creature that Mrs. Avery shows any affection and love to.
- Calvin Banks and "Juicy" Hudson (voiced by Crystal Scales and Michele Morgan) – Two children who are best friends and idolize Thurgood. Calvin is a thin and intelligent boy while "Juicy" is overweight and slow-witted where he has Calvin and Thurgood as a surrogate family due to his parents being shut-ins. Juicy is often made to wear a sign stating "Please Do Not Feed" when he leaves his apartment. Despite appearing dim-witted, Juicy has displayed virtuoso-level talent in cooking, painting, and automotive repair. In late episodes, they are rival admirers of Sharique.
- "Smokey" (voiced by Shawn Michael Howard) – A homeless crackhead, whose antics often anger Thurgood. His real name is Elister, but was referred to as "Mr. Crackhead" and "Mr. Crack" in the first 3 episodes of the series. In one episode, it is revealed that "Smokey" used to train fighting rats under the name "Ratman Crothers" (a reference to Scatman Crothers). He is often insulted with the phrase "You damn stupid crackhead!" by Thurgood (this phrase results in a stand-up comedy act with Smokey and Thurgood in one episode). "Smokey" later quits drug use by season 3, but is still homeless. Despite his homelessness as well as his tendency to steal from tenants whenever possible, Smokey is considered a part of the projects community by most residents.
- Jimmy Ho (voiced by Michael Paul Chan) – A Korean tenant who considers himself part of the African-American community. He is married to Bebe, making him Thurgood's brother-in-law. Jimmy frequently uses urban or "ghetto" phrases (colloquialisms) when he speaks and also speaks of himself as a black person much to Thurgood's frustration. He later finds out that his birth father- whom he never met- was actually Chinese-American, who was also descended from Native Americans. Additionally, he is sometimes criticized for being unemployed as poked fun at in episodes such as "Cliffhangin' with Mr. Super".
- Bebe Ho (née Warren) (voiced by Jenifer Lewis) – Muriel's loud and obnoxious sister. She dislikes Thurgood extremely and has a jealous feud with Muriel but is still very close to her. Bebe appears to have had an active dating/sex life, having slept with most of her high school teachers and an exotic dancer the night before her wedding. Jimmy Ho is her fifth husband.
- Garcelle DuPris ("Haiti Lady") (voiced by Cheryl Francis Harrington) – A Haitian mambo, she is the resident Voodoo queen of the Hilton-Jacobs Projects and a Haitian immigrant. Her powers, though highly potent and proven in the episodes "U Go Kart" and "Cruising For A Bluesing" are rarely seen in action. Examples of her powers are when she literally drives the go-cart built by Thurgood, Calvin, and Juicy "to Hell and back." She also summons a cyclops to scare Calvin and Juicy after they disrespected her and Mrs. Avery. Garcelle often incurs Thurgood's anger for regularly clogging her toilet with paper towels and goat heads. He is generally unfazed by the animal parts and voodoo accessories she flushes with the paper towels, however.
- Emilio Sanchez (or just simply known as Sanchez) (voiced by Pepe Serna) – Thurgood's luckless Cuban friend. He speaks with an electrolarynx because of years of smoking, but it was implied in the episode "Haiti Sings the Blues" that Haiti Lady may have used her voodoo powers to cause that. Emilio once wanted to become an Opera singer. He often expresses sadness over his dead wife, Esperansa. Sanchez wears a blue and white trucker hat with "Nevada" written on the front, which he actually bought in California.
- Walter Burkett (voiced by Marc Wilmore) – The neighborhood parole officer with a past as a crooked cop. His past is regularly alluded to, as many people around the projects owe him favors or are subject to his blackmail. In the Christmas episode "How the Super Stole Christmas", Walter arrested a thug for stealing an old woman's purse, but kept the thug locked in his trunk rather than call the police. He also once helped Thurgood get into prison for free dental care and is shown to be willing (and able) to blackmail judges and business owners. Walter is also portrayed in many episodes (such as "Haiti and the Tramp") to be a sexual deviant, most likely a result from admitting to growing up in a whore house (revealed in "Bougie Nights"). In an episode where Thurgood makes up a ghost story to scare Calvin and Juicy that refers to a nonexistent monster as "the bastard son of a thousand maniacs", Walter turns to Thurgood and wails "I told you that in confidence!"
- Tarnell (voiced by James R. Black) – The local street corner hustler who Thurgood usually turns to when he needs something unusual. He speaks almost entirely in street slang, which Thurgood usually misunderstands, leading to Tarnell delivering the wrong items.
- Rasta Man (voiced by Kevin Michael Richardson) - A Jamaican resident and a stereotype of a marijuana smoker. He is seen in early episodes as a walking smoke cloud, and then absent from most later episodes.
- Papa Hudson and Mama Hudson (voiced by Kevin Michael Richardson and Cassi Davis) – Juicy's parents. They are morbidly obese and confined to their apartment. Because Papa Hudson is so fat, we usually only see his arm and stomach through his door or window. In the episode "Bougie Nights", Papa's face is shown for the first time. In the episode "What's Eating Juicy Hudson?", Papa leaves the apartment for the first time. In the episode "Boyz N the Woods", Papa is confirmed to weigh more than half a ton. Because of the Hudsons' obesity, Juicy is tasked with performing most household functions for the family.
- HUD Lady (voiced by Cassi Davis) – The receptionist at HUD, she always seen through frosted glass who always refuses to give Thurgood what he wants. Despite her unwillingness to help Thurgood do his job, the HUD Lady is surprisingly friendly to Muriel and is willing to grant Thurgood's requests after hearing them from Muriel. Her trademark phrase is "Next!", which she yells at the end of most sentences directed at Thurgood. She is referred to as LaShawnda by the Postman. Her son's name is Chevron, her sister's name is Latrine, and her daughter's name is Lasagna. She represents the stereotype of faceless, underfunded and uncaring bureaucracy upon which HUD residents depend for supplies and guidance.
- Sharique (voiced by Wanda Christine) – Appearing in later episodes, Sharique is a beautiful teen runaway who comes to the projects after her uptown parents are jailed for investment fraud. Beloved by Calvin and Juicy, she moves in with Mrs. Avery.
- Babs and De-Shawn (N/A) – Babs and De-Shawn are addicted to crack and live on the streets like Smokey. Even though Babs speaks, it always seems to be like an animal's screaming, but Smokey is the only one that can understand her. Babs is also portrayed as a hooker (in "He's Gotta Have It" Smokey announces to Babs she has a customer when Thurgood brings up sex). De-Shawn never speaks and is usually seen with Babs and Smokey. Smokey also mentioned that De-Shawn has Tuberculosis in "U Go Kart" and has a diet of rats in "Fear of a Black Rat". Also, whenever Smokey forgets to say something, either Babs or De-Shawn whisper to him what to say (seen in "U Go Kart", and "Let's Get Ready to Rumba").
- Nula – A girl who probably is Calvin and Juicy's classmate that Juicy has a crush on (although she does not approve of his crush on her).

== Locations ==
- Thurgood and Muriel's Apartment – A below street-level apartment near the front of the building.
- Front of the Building and Courtyard – Most outdoor scenes take place here. Thurgood and Sanchez occasionally play chess at the table in the corner of the courtyard.
- Boiler Room – The room where Thurgood comes to plan ideas or relax with a Forty and his collection of Jet magazines. It was briefly a beauty salon for Muriel and Bebe in "Weave's Have a Dream". In one episode, it also features a nuclear reactor that powers the projects.
- The Roof – A variety of events and activities take place here, including the community garden (as seen in "Haiti Sings The Blues") and a gumbo cookoff in "Operation Gumbo Drop”.
- Street Corner – This is where Thurgood usually meets Tarnell and gets the items he's after.
- HUD Building – This is where Thurgood comes to get equipment for the building. The front sign features a number of cynical HUD "slogans" that change in each episode.
- Porno Theater – An old dilapidated movie theater located near the Projects. Thurgood bought it with the intention to fix it up but accidentally bought a dirty movie on opening night.
- Hilton Jacobs Penthouse – In season 1, episode 6, Thurgood discovers a penthouse in the building.

== Episodes ==
Season	Episodes	Originally released		
Season	Episodes	First released	Last released	Network
1	14	January 10, 1999	December 17, 1999	Fox
2	17	May 30, 2000	September 5, 2000	Fox
3	12 ^{(2 unaired)}	October 8, 2000	May 20, 2001	The WB

== Home media ==
Lionsgate Home Entertainment (under license from Disney) has released all 3 seasons on DVD in Region 1.

DVD name	Ep#	Release date
The Complete First Season	13	May 3, 2011
The Complete Second Season	18	July 5, 2011
The Complete Third Season	12	October 4, 2011

== Syndication ==
The series has aired reruns on Adult Swim, Fuse, MTV2, and TV One. Episodes are available on demand for streaming on several apps and websites in the United States including on the LOL! Network and Plex.

== Reception ==
=== Critical response ===
On Rotten Tomatoes, the show's first season holds an approval rating of 50% based on 8 reviews, with an average rating of 6.5/10.

=== Accolades ===
Year	Award	Category	Nominee(s)	Result
1999	Primetime Emmy Award	Outstanding Voice-Over Performance	Ja'net DuBois as Mrs. Avery	Won
1999	Primetime Emmy Award	Outstanding Main Title Theme	George Clinton, Quincy Jones III, La Rita Norman, Marie Norman	Nominated
1999	Primetime Emmy Award	Outstanding Animated Program	Steve Tompkins, Larry Wilmore, Brian Grazer, Ron Howard, Tony Krantz, Eddie Murphy, Will Vinton & Tom Turpin, executive producers; Bill Freiberger & David Flebotte, supervising producers; Mary Sandell, David Bleiman Ichioka, Michael Price & J. Michael Mendel, producers; Al Jean & Mike Reiss, consulting producers; Les Firestein, consulting producer/writer; Donald R. Beck, co-producer; Mark Gustafson, supervising director Episode: "He's Gotta Have It"	Nominated
2000	Primetime Emmy Award	Outstanding Individual Achievement in Animation	Nelson Lowry (art director) Episode: "The Super that Stoled Christmas"	Won
2001	Primetime Emmy Award	Outstanding Voice-Over Performance	Ja'net DuBois as Mrs. Avery Episode: "Let's Get Ready To Rumba"	Won
