= M. E. Holland =

American writer, director and actor

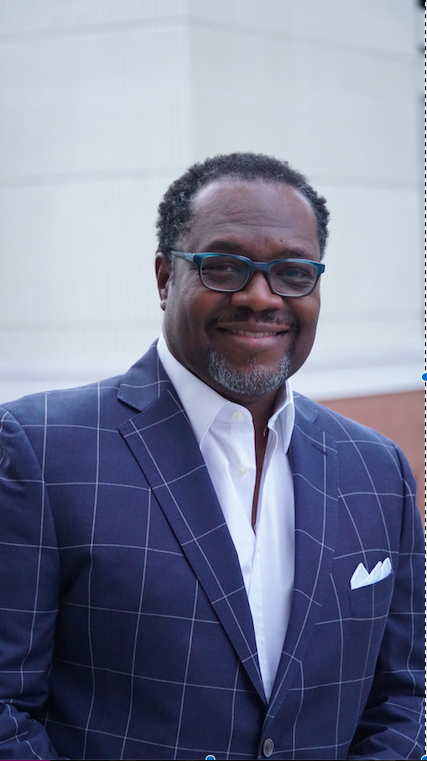
M. E. Holland

M. E. Holland (born in 1967) is an American writer, director, producer, and actor. He owns a production company, DelFlix Pictures. He wrote and directed his first film The Other Brother (2001). In 2007, he wrote the screenplay for Love and Other Four Letter Words. Holland's work covers controversial issues such as sexual abuse, toxic masculinity, American misogyny, and morality in the African American community.

== Early life and education ==
Holland was born January 17, 1967, in Manhattan, New York. His mother, Margaret, was a homemaker, and his father, Nick, owned two stores in Harlem. Around the age of 12, his parents moved the family to Mount Vernon, New York for two years and then to Greenburgh, New York in Westchester County where he graduated from Greenburgh High School.

== Career ==
In 1986, Holland joined the U. S. Army where he received seven service medals and commendations. After being honorably discharged in October 1988, he returned to New York to complete his undergraduate education at Fordham University.

After receiving his B.A. in U.S. History and Minor in African-American Studies in 1992, he started taking non-matriculated courses at The New School in Manhattan and then was accepted at the New York University Tisch School of the Arts, from which he graduated from their film program. Holland won an award from the Writer's Network for a screenplay entitled A Gentleman's Game. He made his first independent feature film prior to graduating by borrowing money from his parents and Gu-Art film lab. He began working as a production assistant intern on Spike Lee's set of Clockers where he met Mekhi Phifer; it was both of their first experiences working in the film industry.

Holland's debut film, The Other Brother, starring Mekhi Phifer, was showcased at the Urbanworld Film Festival and the Sedona International Film Festival. The film was picked up by Xenon Pictures and played in movie theatres across the United States. It was reviewed by Kevin Thmomas in the Los Angeles Times and by Dave Kehr in the New York Times

== Filmography ==
=== Films ===
Year	Title	Crew Role
1995	Clockers	Production Assistant Intern
2002	The Other Brother	Writer, director, producer, Big T
2007	Love & Other Four Letter Words	Writer
2010	My Girlfriend's Back	Writer

=== Music videos ===
Year	Title	Crew Role
1995	Cutie by Raw Stilo	Producer

=== Podcasts ===
Year	Title	Crew Role
2018	Life With The Hendersons	Head Writer

=== Books ===
Year	Title	Role
2018	Invisible	Author
