= Anamorph (film) =

- Theatrical release poster
- Directed by: Henry S. Miller
- Written by: Henry S. Miller; Tom Phelan
- Produced by: Marissa Mazzola-McMahon
- Starring: Willem Dafoe; Scott Speedman; Peter Stormare; Clea DuVall; James Rebhorn; Mick Foley
- Cinematography: Fred Murphy
- Edited by: Geraud Brisson
- Music by: Reinhold Heil; Johnny Klimek
- Distributed by: IFC Films
- Release dates: September 21, 2007 (Milwaukee International Film Festival); April 18, 2008 (United States)
- Running time: 103 minutes
- Country: United States
- Language: English

Anamorph is a 2007 independent psychological thriller film directed by Henry S. Miller and starring Willem Dafoe. Dafoe plays a seasoned detective named Stan Aubray, who notices that a case he has been assigned to bears a striking similarity to a previous case of his. The film is based on the concept of anamorphosis, a painting technique that manipulates the laws of perspective to create two competing images on a single canvas.

Dafoe turned down the role initially but reconsidered after a chance meeting with producer Marissa McMahon on a flight from Los Angeles. The film also has cameo appearances by Mick Foley and Debbie Harry.

The film had its world premiere at the 2007 Milwaukee International Film Festival in Milwaukee, Wisconsin, where star Willem Dafoe started out in theater. It was also shown at the Williamstown Film Festival in November the same year. The film opened in New York City on April 18, 2008 and in Los Angeles on May 2, 2008.

== Plot ==
Stan Aubray (Willem Dafoe) is a seasoned, semi-retired detective with significant obsessive-compulsive disorder and struggling with alcoholism. Resigned to a teaching position for forensic psychology, he is called back to active duty following the elaborately staged murder of a man in a high-rise apartment building. The victim is suspended and surrounded by photography lights, the room sealed off except for a pinhole, creating a projected camera obscura effect on the apartment wall. This crime scene bears many similarities to the Uncle Eddie murders, a series of similarly "artistic" killings, for which Stan was promoted following the prime suspect's death in an attempted arrest. Stan relates some of his difficulties to Sandy, a recovering alcoholic and former prostitute who is a friend of Stan and Crystal, the final victim of Uncle Eddie, and Stan's apparent former lover. Sandy invites Stan on a hiking trip with a group of friends, which Stan declines.

A second killing quickly follows the first, in which the butchered corpse's limbs are hung independently from wires, creating the image of a raven when viewed from the proper angle. Stan begins drinking heavily, even filling his coffee cup with vodka in the middle of work. He also begins to have friction with Detective Carl (Scott Speedman), a recently promoted detective who is resentful of Stan's aloof attitude. Following this, Stan returns home to find his apartment has been broken into, the thief stealing an antique Victorian chair and replacing it with a taping of his inquiry following Crystal and Uncle Eddie's deaths. Stan also notices a painting identical to the camera obscura projection in an antiques store, also painted with identical pigments to the Uncle Eddie killings.

Stan visits Detective Jorge "George" Ruiz, his former partner until the Uncle Eddie murders. After reminiscing briefly, Stan doesn't inform Ruiz of the copycat killings and departs. Partway home he realizes he is being followed and chases his stalker, who escapes. The following morning, Stan is informed Ruiz has been found murdered, his abdomen opened and his innards removed, forming an inkwell of blood. The scene includes a pantograph machine and a half-finished canvas. Using his former partner's blood, Stan paints the other half of the painting, forming the image of a screaming face. The other officers begin to suspect Stan. Attempting to replace his chair, Stan consults with Blair Collet, an antiques dealer who finds antique chairs for Stan, and likens Stan to the killer's patron, as he bought the painting from the antiques store, or his obsession, similar to Francis Bacon's obsession with Pope Innocent. Blair then takes Stan to an art gallery which is filled with model depictions of the recent murders, including Stan's stolen chair. The curator informs them that the artist is Gerri Harden. Searching the art pieces, Stan finds a clay model of the raven, with hundreds of fingerprints still present on the clay. This leads them to a warehouse with a dummy model wearing a Gerri Harden name badge and several paintings, when Stan realizes the name is an anagram from 'a red herring'. During this time, he receives a photograph of Sandy and her friends from the hiking trip.

The next day, Stan receives a call from the killer, who repeatedly tells him "a poison harms" (an anagram for anamorphosis, the artistic technique he is using) and tells Stan to come see his next show, which is another empty warehouse containing diagrams of the final Uncle Eddie murders, including Crystal's, which, when viewed from high above, had the appearance of a body on a rock by a beach shore. Stan, at home, receives a call from Sandy with another invitation, when he realizes that the man who had been stalking him is in the picture. He fails to reach Sandy and tries her AA group, when he learns her sponsor, the man in the picture, drove her away. Sandy is receiving a tattoo of angel's wings, provided by the killer. She blithely remarks that he might be too high to finish and comments that she's never seen him high, and he responds that he'd never put that poison in his veins. Sandy begins to struggle, first for a chance to look at the tattoo, and then for a break, and the killer slits her throat. Stan appears at the studio, without having called in for backup. He sees Sandy slumped over as the killer walks past her. Stan follows the killer, wounding him in the shoulder before being stabbed. The killer drags him to the podium and the chair that they'd found the dummy in and props Stan in place. Stan, noticing the tattoo with an eye stenciled beneath it, places his head on Sandy's back, revealing that, when viewed in conjunction with the warehouse floor, spells out the word 'DEAD', a hallmark of the Uncle Eddie murders.

During this, Detective Carl, at his desk, notices a reflection in the first murder photo off his coffee cup of the raven in the second murder. Searching the raven, he finds the face from the third killing and, in the third killing painting, finds an image of the studio they'd searched. The killer shoots Stan, just before Carl appears and guns down the killer. Stan, struggling for breath, leans back and dies.

== Cast ==
- Willem Dafoe as Stan Aubray
- Scott Speedman as Carl Uffner
- Yul Vazquez as Jorge "George" Ruiz
- Clea DuVall as Sandy Strickland
- James Rebhorn as Chief Lewellyn Brainard
- Amy Carlson as Alexandra Fredericks
- Peter Stormare as Blair Collet
- Don Harvey as Killer
- Paul Lazar as Medical Examiner
- Paz de la Huerta as Young woman
- Edward Hibbert as Gallery Owner
- Mick Foley as Antique Store Owner
- Debbie Harry as Neighbor
- Amir Arison as Profiler
- Desiree Casado as Teenage Checkout Girl

== Critical reception ==
The film received negative to mixed reviews from critics. The review aggregator Rotten Tomatoes reported a 27% approval rating based on 26 reviews, with an average rating of 4.60/10. The site's critics consensus reads: "Thin on plot but heavy on academic references, Anamorph proves more derivative than terrifying." Metacritic reported the film had an average score of 43 out of 100 based on 8 critics, indicating "mixed or average" reviews.
