= List of The PJs episodes =

This is a list of all episodes of The PJs.

== Series overview ==
Season	Episodes	Originally released		
Season	Episodes	First released	Last released	Network
1	14	January 10, 1999	December 17, 1999	Fox
2	17	May 30, 2000	September 5, 2000	Fox
3	12 ^{(2 unaired)}	October 8, 2000	May 20, 2001	The WB

== Episodes ==
=== Season 1 (1999) ===
No. overall	No. in season	Title	Directed by	Written by	Original release date	Prod. code	Viewers (millions)
1	1	"Hangin' with Mr. Super"	John Payson	Donald Beck	January 10, 1999	P-703	21.99
Calvin decides that he wants to be just like Thurgood. But after getting yelled at by Calvin's parents over the phone, Thurgood must change Calvin's mind, and in turn remind himself of how great he is.
2	2	"Bones, Bugs and Harmony"	John Logue	Marc Wilmore	January 12, 1999	P-707	11.36
Thurgood assumes the worst when he finds Mrs. Avery eating dog food.
3	3	"The Door"	Ric Heitzman	Steve Tompkins & Larry Wilmore	January 19, 1999	P-701	11.34
Thurgood gets a thug-proof door from HUD but faces a crisis when a local gang steals it.
4	4	"Journal Fever"	David Bleiman	Kyra Keene & Janine Sherman	January 26, 1999	P-704	9.73
Thurgood decides to take care of Muriel when she gets the flu.
5	5	"Rich Man, Porn Man"	John Logue and Mark Gustafson	Bill Freiberger	February 2, 1999	P-702	11.40
When Thurgood stumbles across an old movie theater, he calls on the help of his tenants to fix it. But he ends up making it a porno theater after accidentally bringing in a dirty movie on opening night thanks to Tarnell.
6	6	"Bougie Nights"	Mark Gustafson	David Flebotte	February 9, 1999	P-705	8.73
A mysterious tenant (who is actually Hilton Jacobs, the owner of the building) dies and bequeaths his luxury penthouse apartment, which the Stubbses move into and then face criticism from the residents that Thurgood has gone "bougie".
7	7	"A Hero Ain't Nothing But A Super"	John Payson	Steve Pepoon	February 16, 1999	P-708	9.07
When the Stubbs get robbed, Muriel comes to the rescue and catches the burglar. But Muriel becomes jealous that Thurgood gets all the credit.
8	8	"He's Gotta Have It"	David Bleiman	Les Firestein	February 23, 1999	P-709	9.29
Thurgood's libido increases when he takes a prescription drug to stabilize his blood pressure.
9	9	"Boyz' N the Woods"	Paul Harrod	Ilana Wernick & Saladin Patterson	April 6, 1999	P-710	8.37
When Thurgood is too late to sign Calvin and Juicy up for a camping trip, he decides that he could give them a better camping trip.
10	10	"Operation Gumbo Drop"	John Logue	Bill Freiberger	April 13, 1999	P-711	8.58
When Thurgood enters a gumbo cooking contest, Juicy enters the contest after encouragement to do so, and a jealous Thurgood decides to sabotage Juicy's gumbo in order to win the contest.
11	11	"U Go Kart"	Billy Jarcho	David Flebotte	May 4, 1999	P-712	8.06
Thurgood builds the boys a go-kart which mysteriously disappears.
12	12	"House Potty"	David Bleiman	Tom Brady	May 11, 1999	P-713	8.82
Thurgood decides to renovate the housing project, not by fixing the problems the tenants have, but by adding a space-age toilet that takes care of his main problem of fixing toilets, and forces him to resign.
13	13	"Haiti Sings the Blues"	Paul Harrod	Ken Keeler	May 18, 1999	P-706	8.22
Haiti Lady places a curse on Thurgood that fails; and she must deal with the loss of both the tenants' and her own self-respect, over her absentee powers.
14	14	"How the Super Stoled Christmas"	John Logue	Story by : Steve Pepoon & Bill Freiberger; Teleplay by : Steve Pepoon	December 17, 1999	P-723	5.53
When Thurgood can't afford to get Muriel a computer for Christmas, he makes a deal with the owner of the pawn shop to repo the items the other tenants can't make their payments for. Unbeknownst to Thurgood, they were skipping their payments to buy Thurgood a Christmas present. Eventually they find out through Nula that Thurgood was the repo Man and proceed to jump him. Parody of How the Grinch Stole Christmas!

=== Season 2 (2000) ===
No. overall	No. in season	Title	Directed by	Written by	Original release date	Prod. code	Viewers (millions)
15	1	"Home School Dazed"	Mike Johnson	Saladin K. Patterson	May 30, 2000	P-715	5.55
Thurgood goes back to school with Calvin & Juicy to get his diploma.
16	2	"The Postman's Always Shot Twice"	Richard C. Zimmerman	Michael Price	May 30, 2000	P-716	5.88
Mrs. Avery accidentally shoots at the building's postman and is sent to a nursing home.
17	3	"The Preacher's Life"	Marv Newland	David Flebotte	June 6, 2000	P-719	5.55
Thurgood decides to become a preacher after being shocked while fixing the Church's electrical problems.
18	4	"The HJs"	Mike Dietz	Bill Freiberger	June 13, 2000	P-718	5.71
Thurgood reopens the radio station and he and Smokey inadvertently become a hit comedy team, until Smokey's popularity enrages him. Note: This is the first episode to have Phil Morris voice Thurgood instead of Eddie Murphy. Mark Moseley is also absent from the cast in this episode.
19	5	"Haiti and the Tramp"	Neema Barnette	Lester Lewis	June 13, 2000	P-717	6.76
Haiti Lady and Walter start falling in love, but when Walter announces they're getting married, it's up to Thurgood to stop the wedding.
20	6	"Smokey the Squatter"	Mike Wellins	Ilana Wernick	June 27, 2000	P-720	6.12
Thurgood and Smokey end up on the run from the law after Thurgood tries to frame Smokey for theft of his TV.
21	7	"Weave's Have A Dream"	Sean Burns	Marc Wilmore	June 27, 2000	P-721	6.28
Thurgood sets up a hair salon for Muriel, but Bebe invites herself in as a stylist, taking customers from Muriel, as the customers prefer Bebe’s gossip. Muriel, then blurts out a secret about Bebe, only it’s not gossip. Not liking the taste of her own medicine, Bebe’s disdain leads to the two sisters coming to fisticuffs.
22	8	"Let's Get Ready To Crumble"	William X. Jarcho	Stephen Leff & Jim Patterson	July 4, 2000	P-731	3.20
Thurgood wrestles with the Governor when they want to tear down the projects and relocate the tenants.
23	9	"Who Da Boss"	Peter Boyd MacLean	Lester Lewis	July 4, 2000	P-725	3.49
Thurgood is pleased when he finds out that Muriel is going to become his boss, however he gets frustrated when he finds out that she wants to make him work.
24	10	"Fear of a Black Rat"	Marv Newland	Robert Gaylor	July 11, 2000	P-726	4.96
Thurgood fights against Don King, Muriel's first love, in the local rat fights.
25	11	"Ghetto Superstars"	Chel White	Kyra Keene & Janine Sherman	July 11, 2000	P-722	5.50
Thurgood becomes the boys' rap star manager. Guest star: Snoop Dogg. Note: This is the third episode to have Phil Morris voice Thurgood instead of Eddie Murphy.
26	12	"What's Eating Juicy Hudson?"	Mike Johnson	Jonathan Goldstein	July 18, 2000	P-728	5.11
Juicy rebels against his father’s smothering and he builds a treehouse with Thurgood’s help.
27	13	"The Jeffersons"	Sean Burns	Ilana Wernick	July 25, 2000	P-714	5.76
Thurgood runs for political office after finding out that he's related to Thomas Jefferson.
28	14	"Robbin' HUD"	Paul Harrod	Michael Price	August 1, 2000	P-729	6.21
When HUD fails to provide the Hilton Jacobs Projects with a new water filter, Thurgood and his posse resort to burglary and discover a distinct absence of honor among thieves.
29	15	"Cliffhangin' With Mr. Super"	John Logue	Larry Wilmore & Steve Tompkins	August 15, 2000	P-735	5.02
Bebe thinks she's pregnant after unintentionally spending a night with Thurgood. Note: This is the fourth episode to have Phil Morris voice Thurgood instead of Eddie Murphy.
30	16	"The Last Affirmative Action Hero"	Lyndon Barrois	Ron Corcillo & A.J. Poulin	August 29, 2000	P-727	4.92
Thurgood is made responsible for protecting the area's image when a film project chooses the PJs for location shooting.
31	17	"Parole Officer and a Gentleman"	John Logue	Reid Harrison	September 5, 2000	P-730	5.25
Walter helps Thurgood go to jail to get dental care, but the friends end up at odds over the price Thurgood has to pay when he's released.: Note: This is the last episode to have voice Eddie Murphy voice Thurgood, Phil Morris takes over fully in Season 3.

=== Season 3 (2000–01) ===
No. overall	No. in season	Title	Directed by	Written by	Original release date	Prod. code	Viewers (millions)
32	1	"Boyz Under the Hood"	Kirk Kelley	Saladin Patterson	October 8, 2000	P-732	3.79
Calvin is jealous of Juicy knowing more about cars than him.
33	2	"Scarthroat"	Carl Willat	Saladin Patterson	December 31, 2000	P-724	2.55
Sanchez, who was the only person to prepare for Y2K, lords over the distribution of victuals after New Year's Eve brings a power outage and food shortage to the Hilton-Jacobs Projects.
34	3	"Smoke Gets In Your High-Rise"	Paul Harrod	Warren Bell	February 4, 2001	237501	3.53
Thurgood makes a deal to place a cigarette advertisement on the side of the Hilton-Jacobs building in exchange for free air-conditioning.
35	4	"National Buffoon's European Vacation"	John Logue	Stephen Leff & Jim Patterson	February 11, 2001	237502	2.28
Juicy develops a crush on Muriel and starts leaving gifts for her anonymously, but Thurgood claims the gifts are from him.
36	5	"Cruising for a Bluesing"	Sean Burns	Dan McGrath	February 18, 2001	237503	2.35
Thurgood tries to get to a Blues gig, but he gets trapped in on the South South Side.
37	6	"It Takes a Thurgood"	K.T. Bell	Kriss Turner	February 25, 2001	237504	2.45
Thurgood discovers a homeless teen named Sharique living in the boiler room.
38	7	"Miracle Cleaner on 134th Street"	Mike Johnson	Mike Barker & Matt Weitzman	April 29, 2001	237505	1.51
Thurgood tells Sharique about a miracle cleaning product he created and how a corporation tried to exploit it.
39	8	"Survival: In tha Hood"	Mike Dietz	Scott Taylor & Freddie Gutierrez & Wesley Johnson	May 6, 2001	237506	1.82
The projects split into two factions for a televised competition based on Survivor called "Survival: In Tha Hood."
40	9	"Let's Get Ready to Rumba"	Marv Newland	Stephen Leff & Jim Patterson	May 13, 2001	237507	1.38
Mrs. Avery makes it through a heart attack and decides to enter a dance contest.
41	10	"A Race to His Credit"	John Logue	Story by : Warren Bell & Dan McGrath; Teleplay by : Michael Rowe & Kriss Turner	May 20, 2001	237508	2.78
Thurgood gets a credit card and, thinking that it's free money, spends it on anything and everything he wants—until he realizes that credit card users have to pay back what they buy.
42	11	"Red Man's Burden"	Paul Harrod	Maiya Williams	2003	P-734	N/A
Jimmy cashes in on his American Indian ancestry when he opens a casino in the projects. Note: The episode was not shown on The WB, but was aired on syndication networks.
43	12	"Clip Show"	Earlton Davis	Steve Tompkins & Larry Wilmore	2003	P-733	N/A
Thurgood talks about his life making the show to an interviewer, with clips from past episodes used to illustrate his points. This episode is done from a lack-of-fourth wall perspective and features a different voice actor for Thurgood. Note: The episode was not shown on The WB, but was aired on syndication networks.
