= The Last Rites of Ransom Pride =

2010 film

- Directed by: Tiller Russell
- Written by: Ray Wylie Hubbard; Tiller Russell
- Produced by: Michael Frisley; Chad Oakes; Duncan Montgomery
- Starring: Lizzy Caplan; Dwight Yoakam; Jon Foster; Jason Priestley; Scott Speedman; Peter Dinklage; Kris Kristofferson
- Cinematography: Roger Vernon
- Edited by: Joel Plotch
- Music by: Jeff Danna
- Distributed by: Screen Media Films
- Release dates: June 17, 2010 (EIFF); September 10, 2010 (United States)
- Running time: 83 minutes
- Country: Canada
- Language: English
- Budget: $8 million

The Last Rites of Ransom Pride is a 2010 Canadian Western film set in 1912 America starring Lizzy Caplan.

== Plot ==
In 1901, Half-breed Juliette Flores sees her tribe and village slaughtered by Mexican troops. Still a child, she takes revenge by slipping into the home of the soldiers' commander, General Juarez, and cutting his throat in his bedroom.

In 1912, Outlaw Ransom Pride (Speedman) is killed in a Mexican border town after an arms deal goes bad. His lover Juliette (Caplan) learns his body is being held by "The Bruja" (de Pablo), a witch who runs the town's brothel. The Bruja informs Juliette that Ransom accidentally shot and killed her brother, a priest, and the only way to redeem Ransom's corpse is to give her Ransom's brother in exchange.

Juliette goes to Glory, a small town in southern Texas. Ransom's father, the Reverend Early Pride (Yoakam), refuses to help her, but after he has passed out drunk, she approaches his younger son, Champ (Foster), and, on the pretext of needing his help to retrieve Ransom's body, lures him off the farm and into accompanying her to Mexico. When Early wakes up and finds Champ gone, he approaches his former Confederate Army comrade Shepherd Graves (Kristofferson) and demands his help in getting Champ back. First, Shepherd sends two bounty hunters, including his own nephew Matthew, to kill Juliette and retrieve Champ. But when Shepherd learns through his contacts that Juliette plans to trade Champ for Ransom's corpse, a livid Early heads south to Mexico himself.

On their journey to Mexico, Champ and Juliette gradually grow closer and encounter several strange travelers, including a circus troupe. After they have outwitted and killed Shepherd's two bounty hunters, Juliette confesses her true intentions to Champ, who proposes that they work together to steal Ransom's body from the Bruja.

The planned heist goes awry when Early bursts in on the confrontation, knocks Juliette unconscious and subdues Champ. The Bruja auctions Juliette off to the highest bidder at the brothel, but before the customer can rape her, she is rescued by a dwarf (Dinklage) and a pair of conjoined twins from the circus troupe, who Juliette had helped earlier. The dwarf (who confided that he was dying anyway) is killed while holding off the Bruja's men, allowing Juliette to escape. Shepherd, who wants revenge for his nephew's death, joins forces with the Bruja to track Juliette down.

When she catches up to Early, he knocks her down, and prepares to shoot her, but Champ rears up and shoots him first. Early's shot goes wide, wounding Juliette in the side, and Champ takes her back to the Pride home to recuperate.

At night, they are ambushed by the Bruja, her Apache henchman, and Shepherd. The Bruja, whose real name is Maria, reveals that she was the newlywed bride of General Juarez, who married him only the day before Juliette killed him. Despite her wound, Juliette manages to evade the Bruja's attack with a knife and cut her throat, while Champ manages to kill Shepherd and the Apache.

Juliette and Champ retrieve Ransom's body and bury it on the Pride farm next to his mother. In voice-over, Juliette relates that she and Champ emigrated to Oklahoma, and then to New Mexico, where Champ died of malaria in 1939, survived by Juliette and their son, Jackson. Champ's tombstone featured a quote from Ransom: "I was always a lover, despite all the killings."

== Cast ==
- Lizzy Caplan as Juliette Flowers
- Dwight Yoakam as Reverend Early Pride
- Jon Foster as Champ Pride
- Jason Priestley as John
- W. Earl Brown as Matthew
- Peter Dinklage as Dwarf
- Scott Speedman as Ransom Pride
- Kris Kristofferson as Shepherd Graves
- Cote de Pablo as Bruja
- Morris Birdyellowhead as Gallo Medico

== Production ==
The Last Rites of Ransom Pride was filmed in Canada in September 2009 in Calgary, Alberta, and Vancouver, British Columbia, on a budget of $8,000,000.
