= Felicity (TV series) =

1998 American drama series

- Genre: College drama
- Created by: J. J. Abrams; Matt Reeves
- Starring: Keri Russell; Scott Speedman; Amy Jo Johnson; Tangi Miller; Scott Foley; Greg Grunberg; Amanda Foreman; Ian Gomez
- Narrated by: Janeane Garofalo; Keri Russell
- Theme music composer: Judith Owen; J. J. Abrams; Andrew Jarecki
- Opening theme: "Felicity Theme" (seasons 1–2); "New Version of You" (seasons 3–4)
- Composers: W. G. Snuffy Walden; Joseph Williams; Danny Pelfrey; Jon Huck; John Zuker
- Country of origin: United States
- Original language: English
- No. of seasons: 4
- No. of episodes: 84 (list of episodes)

Production
- Executive producers: J. J. Abrams; Brian Grazer; Tony Krantz; Matt Reeves; Jennifer Levin; Ron Howard; John Eisendrath; Laurie McCarthy
- Production locations: New York City; Los Angeles; University of Southern California
- Cinematography: Robert Primes; Michael Bonvillain; Marshall Adams
- Camera setup: Single-camera
- Running time: 42–45 minutes
- Production companies: Imagine Television; Touchstone Television

Original release
- Network: The WB
- Release: September 29, 1998 – May 22, 2002

Felicity is an American coming-of-age drama television series created by J. J. Abrams and Matt Reeves and produced by Imagine Television and Touchstone Television for the WB. Brian Grazer and Ron Howard were executive producers through Imagine Entertainment.

The series revolves around the college experiences of the title character, Felicity Porter (portrayed by Keri Russell), as she attends the "University of New York" (based on New York University), across the country from her home in Palo Alto, California. The show ran for four seasons, from September 29, 1998, to May 22, 2002, with each season corresponding to the traditional American university divisions of freshman, sophomore, junior, and senior years.

In 2007, Felicity was one of Time magazine's "All-Time 100 Best TV Shows". AOL TV named Felicity one of the "Best School Shows of All Time". In June 2010, Entertainment Weekly named Felicity Porter one of the "100 Greatest Characters of the Last 20 Years".

== Plot ==
| Season | Episodes | Originally released | |
| Season | Episodes | First released | Last released |
|---|---|---|---|
| 1 | 22 | September 29, 1998 | May 25, 1999 |
| 2 | 23 | September 26, 1999 | May 24, 2000 |
| 3 | 17 | October 4, 2000 | May 23, 2001 |
| 4 | 22 | October 10, 2001 | May 22, 2002 |

The series opens at Felicity's high school graduation, where she asks Ben Covington, a classmate on whom she has a crush, to sign her yearbook. Moved by his comment that he wished they had gotten to know each other further, she changes her education plans completely, deciding to follow Ben to New York rather than attend Stanford University as a pre-med student. Felicity's overbearing parents, concerned about Felicity's seemingly rash decision, come to New York to try to persuade her to return home and "get back on track". Felicity has second thoughts about her decision, but soon realizes that she came not only to follow Ben, but to discover her true inner self.

While Felicity works to sort out her emotions, she continues the basic motions of student life and moves into her dorm. There, she meets the resident advisor Noel Crane. Eventually, the two develop a romantic relationship, and the love triangle among Felicity, Ben, and Noel forms the basic dramatic conflicts in the show throughout the series.

A number of other characters appear and play large roles in Felicity's life. Her roommate for the first two years is Meghan Rotundi, a goth Wiccan who occasionally casts spells on Felicity and others. Julie Emrick is one of Felicity's best friends, as is Elena Tyler, who often takes classes with Felicity. Felicity also has male friends, including Sean Blumberg, who is always trying to produce new off-kilter inventions, and Javier Clemente Quintata, who manages the Dean & DeLuca where Felicity works for most of her college career.

A recurring episode opener of the show is a stark camera shot of Felicity sitting in a dormitory room or apartment holding a tape recorder, recalling events in order to make a cassette tape to send to an old friend named Sally Reardon (voiced by Janeane Garofalo). This occasionally provides a method for Felicity to narrate an entire episode. At the end of episodes like this, Felicity is often shown to be listening to a tape that Sally has sent in reply.

== Cast and characters ==
Characters are listed in title credit order and by appearance on the show.

| Actor | Character | Seasons | | | |
| Actor | Character | 1 | 2 | 3 | 4 |
|---|---|---|---|---|---|
| Keri Russell | Felicity Porter | Main | Main | Main | Main |
| Scott Speedman | Ben Covington | Main | Main | Main | Main |
| Amy Jo Johnson | Julie Emrick | Main | Main | Main | Special Guest |
| Tangi Miller | Elena Tyler | Main | Main | Main | Main |
| Scott Foley | Noel Crane | Main | Main | Main | Main |
| Greg Grunberg | Sean Blumberg | Recurring | Main | Main | Main |
| Amanda Foreman | Meghan Rotundi | Recurring | Main | Main | Main |
| Ian Gomez | Javier Clemente Quintata | Recurring | Recurring | Recurring | Main |

== Production ==
=== Setting ===
Felicity was filmed in part in New York City, and is set at the fictional University of New York (UNY), based on New York University (NYU). Like NYU, UNY is located in Greenwich Village near Washington Square Park, and the school is an important part of the show. Although like other universities, NYU normally welcomes being mentioned in film or on television as free product placement, the university refused permission for the show to use its name, stating that "[t]he negatives kind of outweighed the positives".

=== Writer's age ===
In 1999, a publicly hyped young writer for the show, Riley Weston, was disclosed as a fraud for claiming to be much younger than she truly was. At the age of 32, she began marketing herself to television studios as a recent high school graduate, passing off her husband as her older brother. She was soon hired by the WB as a writer for Felicity. Hailed as a child prodigy and "wunderkind", she was featured on Entertainment Weekly's October 1998 list of the "100 Most Creative People in Entertainment", which described her as an up-and-coming 19-year-old. Shortly thereafter, she was offered a six-figure screenwriting deal with Disney.

=== Time-slot and hairstyle changes ===
In the summer of 1999, after filming the first season, Felicity star Russell—known for what The New York Times described as "[t]hat glorious head of voluminous golden backlit hair"—sent the show's producers a photo wearing a short-haired wig. They panicked before learning that it was a joke but then suggested to the actress that a new hairstyle would be appropriate. After being shifted from Tuesday nights at 9:00 pm Eastern to Sunday nights at 8:00 pm Eastern (WB's weakest night) for the 1999–2000 season, the ratings for Felicity declined immediately. This decline occurred before the hairstyle change, but the later hair-style change became conflated by some of the public and by some of the popular press and network executives with this earlier event and thus incorrectly blamed the earlier ratings drop partly on the later new hairstyle. After the negative reaction Russell rejected wearing extensions or a wig while her hair grew back. Although storytelling and time-slot changes had already created a ratings decline, a network executive said WB actors' future hair changes would "be given more thought at the network than it previously would have". In 2010, TV Guide Network listed the hairstyle change at No. 19 on their list of "25 Biggest TV Blunders", with several commentators arguing that it was the reason that the ratings of the show dropped. Russell did not agree with the network's attribution of the ratings decline, telling Entertainment Weekly in 2000, "I think that's a pretty lame excuse. I think a lot more than a haircut was deciding the ratings [last year]", which – according to a September 29, 2023, Time magazine article – included the timeslot change, which cost the show one third of its viewers. Shannon Carlin, author of the Time article, also pointed to a decline in viewership for the network overall, which by May 2000, was in last place in ratings. The haircut incident went on to become a popular culture reference within other television shows, both comedic and dramatic. Despite the controversy, Felicity continued for two more seasons.

== Home media ==
All four seasons were re-released on DVD by ABC Studios on April 7, 2009, in "slimmer" packaging. On February 9, 2012, it was announced that Lionsgate Home Entertainment had acquired the rights to the series and planned on re-releasing it. Seasons 1 and 2 were re-released on May 1, 2012, and do not contain any extras, subtitles, or other languages besides English. Seasons 3 and 4 were re-released on May 7, 2013.

| Title | Release | Details | Special features |
|---|---|---|---|
| Felicity: Freshman Year Collection | November 5, 2002 (United States); November 4, 2003 (Australia & New Zealand) | 22 episodes; 6-disc set; 1.33:1 Aspect Ratio; Subtitles: English, French (Australia), Dutch (Australia); Languages: English (Dolby Digital 2.0 Surround); French (Dolby Digital 2.0 Surround) (Australia) | Audio commentary on "Pilot"; J. J. Abrams and Matt Reeves (Co-creators and executive producers); Audio commentary on "Felicity Was Here"; J. J. Abrams and Matt Reeves (Co-creators and executive producers) |
| Felicity: Sophomore Year Collection | July 22, 2003 (United States) | 23 episodes; 6-disc set; 1.33:1 Aspect Ratio; Subtitles: English; Languages: English (Dolby Digital 2.0 Surround); Spanish | 5 audio commentaries; Never-before-seen Network Pilot episode; Keri Russell's audition; Felicity "Emmy Parody" spoof (Produced for the Emmy broadcast) |
| Felicity: Junior Year Collection | September 21, 2004 (United States) | 17 episodes; 5-disc set; 1.33:1 Aspect Ratio; Subtitles: English; Languages: English (Dolby Digital 2.0 Surround); Spanish | Audio commentaries; "Docuventary: A Look Back at Season 3 with Greg Grunberg"; Mad TV Parody |
| Felicity: Senior Year Collection | March 8, 2005 (United States) | 22 episodes; 6-disc set; 1.33:1 Aspect Ratio; Subtitles: English; Languages: English (Dolby Digital 5.1 Surround); Spanish | Audio commentaries; "The Lost Elena Scenes" – J. J. Abrams and Matt Reeves present deleted scenes from the finale, showing that Felicity saves Elena's life by convincing her to attend medical school at Duke instead of Columbia.; "Fade Out" – Behind-the-scenes reflections with Keri Russell and the show's creators; Creating characters – Q&A with J. J. Abrams, Keri Russell, Matt Reeves, and Jennifer Garner |

== Reception ==
=== Critical response ===
The first season holds a 91% approval rating on review aggregator Rotten Tomatoes, based on 32 critic reviews. The website's critics consensus reads, "Felicity elevates the sudsier elements of relationship dramas with its keen insight into burgeoning adulthood and the college experience, with a captivating Keri Russell shepherding viewers along the journey." On Metacritic, the first season holds a weighted average score of 87/100, based on 27 critics, indicating "universal acclaim".

James Collins of Time magazine wrote, "Abrams and Reeves succeed in making their show lightly cinematic... What really makes Felicity enjoyable, though, is that despite its requisite melodrama, it is emotionally plausible and endearing." Tom Shales of The Washington Post wrote, "Felicity is so skillfully written and acted that it's hard to imagine an age group that couldn't be touched by it and feel involved." Dave Walker of The Arizona Republic wrote, "A skillfully executed product targeted at a specific consumer market. There are moments when Felicity is better than that, when it rises to the comparatively lofty level of occasionally pretty good, and Russell is usually the reason."

In a negative review, Jonathan Storm of The Philadelphia Inquirer wrote, "Felicity is phony. It presents a fantasy world, pretending it's real. A lot of people criticize Ally McBeal for the same thing, but there's a big difference. The people in their 20s who would take life cues from Ally should be old enough to know better."

=== Ratings ===
The series debut garnered 7.1 million viewers.

| Season | Episodes | Original airing | | | Rank | Viewers (in millions) |
| Season | Episodes | Season premiere | Season finale | TV season | Rank | Viewers (in millions) |
|---|---|---|---|---|---|---|
| 1 | 22 | September 29, 1998 | May 25, 1999 | 1998–1999 | #124 | 4.4 |
| 2 | 23 | September 26, 1999 | May 24, 2000 | 1999–2000 | #138 | 2.2 |
| 3 | 17 | October 4, 2000 | May 23, 2001 | 2000–2001 | #123 | 3.9 |
| 4 | 22 | October 10, 2001 | May 22, 2002 | 2001–2002 | #139 | 3.2 |

=== Accolades ===
Felicity was nominated for 38 awards during its run from 1998 to 2002 and won several, including an Emmy Award for Outstanding Cinematography for a Series for Robert Primes and Golden Globe Award for Best Actress – Television Series Drama for Keri Russell.

| Year | Award | Category | Nominees(s) | Result | Ref. |
|---|---|---|---|---|---|
| 1999 | Artios Awards | Best Casting for TV, Dramatic Pilot | Marcia Shulman | Won | |
| 1999 | Eddie Awards | Best Edited Series for Television | Stan Salfas, Warren Bowman | Nominated | |
| 1999 | Golden Globes | Best Actress – Drama Series | Keri Russell | Won | |
| 1999 | Golden Globes | Best Series – Drama | Felicity | Nominated | |
| 1999 | People's Choice Awards | Favorite TV Drama | Felicity | Won | |
| 1999 | People's Choice Awards | Favorite TV Drama Actress | Keri Russell | Nominated | |
| 1999 | OFTA Television Awards | Best Actress in a Drama Series | Keri Russell | Nominated | |
| 1999 | OFTA Television Awards | Best Actress in a New Drama Series | Keri Russell | Won | |
| 1999 | OFTA Television Awards | Best Direction in a Drama Series | Felicity | Nominated | |
| 1999 | OFTA Television Awards | Best Music in a Series | Felicity | Nominated | |
| 1999 | OFTA Television Awards | Best New Drama Series | Felicity | Nominated | |
| 1999 | OFTA Television Awards | Best New Theme Song in a Series | W. G. Snuffy Walden | Nominated | |
| 1999 | OFTA Television Awards | Best New Titles Sequence in a Series | Felicity | Nominated | |
| 1999 | Primetime Emmy Awards | Outstanding Cinematography for a Series | Robert Primes | Won | |
| 1999 | Teen Choice Awards | Choice TV: Actor | Scott Foley | Nominated | |
| 1999 | Teen Choice Awards | Choice TV: Actress | Keri Russell | Nominated | |
| 1999 | Teen Choice Awards | Choice TV: Breakout Performance | Scott Foley | Nominated | |
| 1999 | Teen Choice Awards | Choice TV: Breakout Performance | Keri Russell | Won | |
| 1999 | Teen Choice Awards | Choice TV: Breakout Performance | Scott Speedman | Nominated | |
| 1999 | Teen Choice Awards | Choice TV: Drama Series | Felicity | Nominated | |
| 1999 | Television Critics Association Awards | Outstanding New Program | Felicity | Nominated | |
| 2000 | ALMA Awards | Special Achievement Award | Ian Gomez | Won | |
| 2000 | American Society of Cinematographers Awards | Outstanding Achievement in Cinematography in Regular Series | Robert Primes | Nominated | |
| 2000 | GLAAD Media Awards | Outstanding TV Drama Series | Felicity | Nominated | |
| 2000 | Primetime Emmy Awards | Outstanding Music Composition for a Series | Danny Pelfrey, W. G. Snuffy Walden | Nominated | |
| 2000 | Teen Choice Awards | Choice TV: Actor | Scott Foley | Nominated | |
| 2000 | Teen Choice Awards | Choice TV: Actor | Scott Speedman | Nominated | |
| 2000 | Teen Choice Awards | Choice TV: Actress | Keri Russell | Nominated | |
| 2000 | Teen Choice Awards | Choice TV: Sidekick | Ian Gomez | Nominated | |
| 2000 | Teen Choice Awards | Choice TV: Sidekick | Amy Jo Johnson | Nominated | |
| 2000 | Teen Choice Awards | Choice TV Show: Drama | Felicity | Nominated | |
| 2001 | GLAAD Media Awards | Outstanding TV Drama Series | Felicity | Nominated | |
| 2001 | Teen Choice Awards | Choice TV: Actress | Keri Russell | Nominated | |
| 2001 | Teen Choice Awards | Choice TV Show: Drama | Felicity | Nominated | |
| 2002 | NAACP Image Awards | Outstanding Actress in a Drama Series | Tangi Miller | Nominated | |
| 2002 | Teen Choice Awards | Choice TV: Action/Drama | Felicity | Nominated | |
| 2002 | Teen Choice Awards | Choice TV Actor: Drama | Scott Foley | Nominated | |
| 2002 | Teen Choice Awards | Choice TV Actor: Drama | Scott Speedman | Nominated | |
| 2002 | Teen Choice Awards | Choice TV Actress: Drama | Keri Russell | Nominated | |
