= List of Felicity characters =

The following is a partial list of characters from the television series Felicity:

The season two cast members of the show. Amanda Foreman, Amy Jo Johnson (top row, left to right); Greg Grunberg, Keri Russell, Scott Speedman, Tangi Miller (middle row); Scott Foley (lower row).

== Main characters ==
=== Felicity Elizabeth Porter ===
The title character is played by Keri Russell. The series opens with Felicity's high school graduation. Following the ceremony she sees Ben, her high school crush, and goes over to ask him to sign her year book. The note he writes is thoughtful, and hints at missed opportunity and disappointment. Felicity decides to abandon her plans to study pre-med at Stanford University and instead follows Ben to New York. Once there she realizes her decision was more than about Ben, that she needs to find herself, away from her parents' influence and expectations. She is a remarkably intelligent and thoughtful person, yet can be led to make rather impulsive and rash decisions. As the show progresses she grows into a more secure and centered young woman. Felicity chooses to be an art major.

=== Ben Steven Covington ===
Ben (Scott Speedman) is the reason Felicity goes to school in New York. Like Felicity, he is from Palo Alto, California. Surprised at seeing her there, he becomes uncomfortable with her interest in him. Ben comes from a complex home life. He has a great deal of conflict with his father (played by John Ritter), who is an alcoholic who routinely makes promises that he fails to keep. Ben's mother on the other hand, is a stable and loving parent. Felicity's best friend Julie and Ben come to share a mutual attraction to one another, but Julie is hesitant out of concern for Felicity. Eventually Ben and Julie start a relationship mid-way through their freshman year, but break up just before the summer break. Ben suffers a brief gambling addiction, and serious financial issues that threaten his tuition and livelihood. Ben and Felicity begin a relationship at the end of their freshman year, but it quickly ends when Ben becomes worried. This is followed by a strung out affair with a married caterer named Maggie, who is vindictive over her husband's philandering. Ben and Felicity's relationship is a central feature of the show, and shifts between a friendship and a romantic relationship off and on throughout the series. Ben has difficulty expressing his feelings and initially appears not to be very thoughtful or contemplative, especially in contrast to Felicity. Ben becomes a protective and loyal friend to Felicity. An average student, Ben is personable and athletic. He often makes hasty or detrimental decisions which he comes to regret. Over the course of the series Ben's true depth and sensitivity become apparent.

=== Noel Crane ===
Played by Scott Foley. Noel first appeared in the show as Felicity's sophomore Resident Advisor. Felicity often vents to him about her unrequited love interest Ben; this creates internal conflict for Noel as he romantically pursues Felicity. Noel also has a long-term, long distance girlfriend named Hanna (Jennifer Garner) who is a composer. They break up on Thanksgiving after Hanna reveals that she is spending time with a man at her college. Noel begins dating Felicity that very day. They experience stumbling blocks along the way, namely Noel's conflicted feelings for ex-girlfriend Hanna, and when Felicity in turn loses her virginity to an art student (Simon Rex). They break up after a few months when she chooses a summer road trip with Ben over Noel's invitation to Berlin. But Noel entertains the notion of a romantic relationship with Felicity for the rest of the series. He moves into a two-bedroom apartment at the onset of his junior year and is roommates with Elena. His tension with Felicity eases to the point of affection. Noel meets Ruby, a freshman advisee and dorm-mate to Felicity. Ruby is a new actress vying for the romantic lead opposite Tom Cruise in a blockbuster film. She gets the part. Noel and Ruby maintain a long-distance set-up while she's on location, with regular visits. Noel ends the relationship after two or three months when he learns that Ruby is pregnant with a child who is not related to him. In the summer between Junior and Senior years, Noel drops out of college, gets highlights and marries Javier's cousin, Natalie (Ali Landry). He is eventually talked down by his friends and associates, re-darkens his hair and annuls the marriage. Noel is a self-identified computer geek with a particular fondness for Mac computers and graphic design. Noel comes from a working-class background and has one older brother whom he looks up to as a model guy complete with the ideal girlfriend. Unbeknownst to Noel, his brother (Eddie McClintock) is gay. He comes out to Noel in the first season, and asks for support in sharing this with their parents.

=== Elena Tyler ===
Played by Tangi Miller. Elena is Felicity's first lab partner and also lives on Felicity's floor in the dorm. She is from New York and prior to University she lived with her widowed father. Her mother died of cancer when she was "very young." Elena is from a working-class background and her tuition is paid through scholarships. She is a fiercely competitive and driven student with plans to attend medical school. She appears more confident and direction driven than Felicity, but, as they become closer, she opens up and reveals some her own insecurities. Elena has a few romantic relationships through the course of the show. She dates Blair, a fellow student, for the first half of her freshman year until Felicity catches Blair and Elena's best friend in an affair. After seeing the two for herself, Elena ends the relationship by punching Blair in the face. These events bring Elena and Felicity closer together as friends. Later that year, Elena embarks on an affair with her much older professor, Dr. McGrath. She volunteers to fill in for his assistant in the evenings and the two develop a relationship after a string of flirtations. Later it becomes apparent that she is only one of several students he has seduced. Elena's most significant relationship is with Tracy, a virgin. They become engaged but ultimately do not marry.

=== Julie Emrick ===
Played by Amy Jo Johnson. Julie is Felicity's first real friend at UNY. She is a guitar player and singer/songwriter. Julie has a mutual attraction with Ben, Felicity's main love interest and impetus for moving to New York. Julie is flirtatious by nature and often finds herself in uncomfortable situations involving men. During first year she dates a film student, who goes on to date rape her. Around this time, she finds comfort and patience in Ben who supports her through the emotional aftermath in late night conversation and sleepovers. They date halfway into freshman year for a few months. At the end of that year, Ben uses the "heavy" tone of the relationship as a reason to break up. Julie later finds out that Ben was interested in Felicity. Also in the first season, it is revealed that Julie has come to New York to find her birth mother. Julie hires a private detective who finds her. She then applies for an internship at her birth mother's firm in order to learn more about her. Julie finds that the two have much in common, including a talent for rhythm guitar. Eventually, she confronts her mother with her identity, and after the initial shock they form a warm dialogue. Julie later finds out that her mother's current husband is actually her birth father. She was conceived when they were teenagers and her mother gave birth to Julie unbeknownst to her father. The two reconnected in college, were married and had two more children. Julie's birth mother fears being exposed and is more than hesitant to introduce Julie to her father. Sophomore year, Julie moves into Sean and Ben's apartment. She places a greater focus on her music and turning it into a career.

=== Sean Blumberg ===
Played by Greg Grunberg. Sean is not a student at UNY with everyone else. He is in his mid to late twenties and owns his own loft apartment. Ben is roommates with him during the first season and subsequently, Julie, Meghan and Noel all live there at some point. He doesn't appear to have a job throughout the series (until the end), but is constantly coming up with new entrepreneurial ideas. A partial list includes: marzipan boxers (edible), disposable camera vending machines, Lacto's milk-less cereal (just add water), Bagel knobs – injected w/ cream cheese and lox, etc., Shreme (sugar and cream), Flavored pen caps, Marshmallow rotisserie, Smoothaise (a condiment of unknown ingredients), Shrimp yogurt, ‘Before and After’ – a restaurant that only serves appetizers and desserts, Sleep mask alarm clock combo, Comfort cologne – smells like guys’ favorite foods - mac and cheese, brisket, lasagna, etc. and Shoe covers. In season 2, he and Meghan Rotundi begin dating and in season 4 they, rather impulsively, get married.

=== Meghan Rotundi ===
Played by Amanda Foreman. Meghan is Felicity's first roommate during her dorm days. She is a goth wiccan and appears to be the polar opposite of Felicity, whom she describes living with as "like living with a TV that's always playing Little House on the Prairie, only with more sweaters." Initially she and Felicity fail to see eye-to-eye on things, but by the end of the series Meghan and Felicity have formed a very close and lasting friendship.

=== Javier Clemente Quintata ===
Played by Ian Gomez. Javier is Felicity and Ben's manager at Dean & DeLuca, a coffee shop. He is from Spain, speaks in a strong Spanish accent and is animated and bubbly. He becomes very close with both Felicity and Ben and, through them comes to know Elena, Noel and Julie. He has a boyfriend, Samuel and they get married at the end of season two. He also decides to go back to school and get his degree beginning in season three.

== Recurring cast ==
Name	Portrayed by	Episodes	Year
Richard Coad	Rob Benedict	36	1998–2002
Tracy	Donald Faison	23	2000–2002
Ruby	Amy Smart	16	1999–2001
Molly	Sarah-Jane Potts	14	2000–2001
Sally Reardon	Janeane Garofalo	14	1998–2000
Dr. Toni Pavone	Amy Aquino	10	2000–2002
Dr. Edward Porter	Erich Anderson	9	1998–2002
Greg Stenson	Chris William Martin	9	2000
Trevor O'Donnell	Christopher Gorham	8	2001–2002
Zoe Webb	Sarah Jane Morris	8	2001–2002
Lynn McKennan	Dash Mihok	7	1999
Professor Bill Hodges	Jim Ortlieb	7	2001–2002
Guy	Brian Klugman	7	1998–1999
Barbara Porter/Hunter	Eve Gordon	7	1998–2002
Mr. Andrew Covington	John Ritter	7	2000–2002
Dr. Peter McGrath	Chris Sarandon	6	1999
Owen	Shawn Hatosy	6	2001–2002
Lauren	Lisa Edelstein	6	2001–2002
Blair	Shan Omar Huey	6	1998–1999
Zach	Devon Gummersall	5	1998
David Sherman	Henri Lubatti	5	1999
Maggie Sherwood	Teri Polo	5	1999
Mr. Norman	Bob Clendenin	5	1998–2002
Brian Burke/"Burky"	Michael Peña	5	1999–2000
Dominic Webb	Christopher Allport	5	2001–2002
Carol Anderson	Jane Kaczmarek	5	1999–2000
Carl	L.B. Fisher	5	1999
Professor Annie Sherman	Sally Kirkland	4	1999
Eli	Simon Rex	4	1999
DeForrest Ingram	Kenan Thompson	4	2001
Jeremy Cavallo	Rick Worthy	4	2001
Avery Swanson	Kristin Lehman	4	2001
Lewis	Jan Schweiterman	4	1998–1999
Finn	Chris Engen	4	2000
Natalie	Ali Landry	4	2000
John Papaleno	Darnell Williams	3	1998–1999
Hanna Bibb	Jennifer Garner	3	1998–2002
Rita	Bitty Schram	3	2001–2002
Faye Rotundi	Nancy Lenehan	3	1999–2001
Danny	Curtis Armstrong	3	1999
Walter Rotundi	Paul Vincent O'Connor	3	1999–2001
Swim Coach	Drew Pillsbury	3	1999–2000
Erik Kidd	Adam Rodriguez	3	1999–2000
Mr. Rogalsky	William Monaghan	3	1998
Daryl	Jarrod Crawford	3	1998–1999
Tina	Susan Dalian	3	1999
Leila Foster	Keiko Agena	3	2000
Jane Scott	Tyra Banks	3	2000
James	Eddie Cahill	3	2000
Randy	James Carpinello	3	2000
Professor Mary Morton	Elaine Kagan	3	2000
Al-Anon Leader	Nicki Micheaux	3	2000
Casey	David Smigelski	3	2000
Lloyd	Kevin Sutherland	3	2000
