= Amanda Foreman (actress) =

American actress

- Occupation: Actress
- Years active: 1989–2016

Amanda Foreman is an American actress best known for her role as Meghan Rotundi on the college drama series Felicity (1998–2002).

== Career ==
Foreman has worked on four series produced and/or created by J. J. Abrams. On Felicity, she played Felicity's college roommate, Meghan Rotundi, a Wiccan who – in "Help for the Lovelorn" (January 23, 2000), an homage to The Twilight Zone – uses her magic on Felicity. She was a recurring guest star until 2006 on the spy drama Alias, where she played Carrie Bowman, an NSA agent and the wife of Marshall Flinkman (Kevin Weisman). Foreman later starred as Ivy on ABC's What About Brian, which was canceled in May 2007.

Foreman has guest starred on shows such as Nash Bridges, Six Feet Under, ER, and In Plain Sight. She also had a recurring role as Katie Kent, a patient of Violet Turner, on Private Practice, which she reprised in Season 4.

Foreman had a recurring role on Parenthood as Suze Lessing.

== Filmography ==
=== Film ===
| Year | Title | Role | Notes |
|---|---|---|---|
| 1992 | Live Wire | Molly | |
| 1992 | Forever Young | Debbie | |
| 1993 | Sliver | Samantha Moore | |
| 1994 | Future Shock | Paula | |
| 1997 | Delivery | Marilyn | |
| 1999 | Road Kill | Shayla | |
| 2000 | Rocket's Red Glare | Jennifer | |
| 2001 | On the Line | Julie | |
| 2003 | Purgatory Flats | Natalie Reed | |
| 2005 | Happy Endings | Lane | |
| 2005 | Extreme Dating | Tracy | |
| 2006 | Jam | Stephanie | |
| 2006 | Inland Empire | Tracy | |
| 2007 | Revolution Summer | Polly | |
| 2009 | Star Trek | Hannity | |
| 2011 | Super 8 | Lydia Connors | |
| 2013 | Star Trek Into Darkness | Ensign Brackett | |
| 2013 | Meet My Rapist | Therapist | Short |

=== Television ===
| Year | Title | Role | Notes |
|---|---|---|---|
| 1989 | The Preppie Murder | Larissa | TV film |
| 1992 | Murder Without Motive: The Edmund Perry Story | Heather | TV film |
| 1997 | Relativity | Lucy | "The Day the Earth Moved" |
| 1997 | Breast Men | Lola | TV film |
| 1998 | To Have & to Hold | Shanee Ramsey | "Since I Don't Know You" |
| 1998–2002 | Felicity | Meghan Rotundi | Recurring (season 1); Main cast (season 2–4): 67 episodes |
| 1999 | Nash Bridges | Gina Banks | "Frisco Blues", "Goodbye Kiss" |
| 2003 | Six Feet Under | Rebecca | "Tears, Bones & Desire" |
| 2003 | Miss Match | Marla Kenton | "Who's Your Daddy?" |
| 2003–06 | Alias | Carrie Bowman | Guest (season 2, 4–5); Recurring (season 3): 8 episodes |
| 2005 | Inconceivable | Nina | "Pilot" |
| 2006–07 | What About Brian | Ivy | Regular role |
| 2007 | All I Want for Christmas | Amber | TV film |
| 2008 | ER | Missy Voltaire | "Truth Will Out" |
| 2008 | McBride: Requiem | Felicia Hart | TV film |
| 2009 | In Plain Sight | Grace Royal / Grace Rogan | "In My Humboldt Opinion" |
| 2009–11 | Private Practice | Katie Kent | Recurring (season 2–3); Guest (season 4): 5 episodes |
| 2010 | Grey's Anatomy | Nora | "These Arms of Mine" |
| 2010–12 | Parenthood | Suze Lessing | Recurring (season 1–2); Guest (season 3–4): 9 episodes |
| 2011 | Criminal Minds: Suspect Behavior | Susan | "Devotion" |
| 2011 | Love's Christmas Journey | Adrienne Wayne | TV film |
| 2011 | House | Olivia | "Perils of Paranoia" |
| 2013 | The Christmas Spirit | Pam | TV film |
| 2013–16 | Awkward | Barbara McKibben | Recurring |
| 2014 | Selfie | Nancy | "A Little Yelp from My Friends" |
| 2016 | The Catch | Susan Bailey | "The Trial" |
