= Riley Weston =

American actress

- Weston in 2014
- Born: August 25, 1966 (age 60)
- Occupations: Actress; screenwriter; author; singer; songwriter
- Years active: 1987–present
- Website: www.rileyweston.com

Riley Weston (born August 25, 1966) is an American actress, screenwriter, country music artist, and award-winning author. As an actress, she has had supporting lead roles in TV movies including Have We Met This Christmas (Great American Family) and The Caretaker Next Door (Lifetime), as well as co-writing the script for Have We Met This Christmas with Danica McKeller. As a singer-songwriter, she is a frequent performer at the Bluebird Café, opened shows for Lee Brice and Montgomery Gentry, and her single "Love of Christmas" (from her album "Love of Christmas") was nominated for a Holiday Music & Film Award in 2026.

As a writer, she has written screenplays for the Hallmark Channel, Great American Family, and Lifetime including A Harvest Homecoming starring Trevor Donovan and Jessica Lowndes, Christmas in Midnight Clear (Jon McLaren), and Meet Me in the Margins (Merritt Patterson and Liam McIntyre).

Her debut novel, before i go, won an Independent Publisher Book Award for "Storyteller of the Year" as well as winning New York Book Festival's Grand Prize for "Best Fiction."

Weston became embroiled in a debate about ageism in Hollywood after it was discovered that she lied about her age to get work in the entertainment industry.

== Early life ==
Riley Weston (Kimberlee Seaman) was born in Dutchess County, New York. After graduating from Arlington High School she moved to Hollywood.

== Career ==
=== Early work ===
Beginning in 1987, Weston began a career as a film and television actor, working steadily throughout her twenties in a series of mostly small bit parts. Her credits included the sitcoms Growing Pains, Who's the Boss? and 3rd Rock From The Sun, and the film Sister Act 2: Back in the Habit. Through about 1996, she was credited in her appearances as "Kimberlee Kramer".

=== Age deception and Felicity ===
Weston became embroiled in a debate about ageism for failing to disclose her true age while working as an actress and writer on Felicity. In May 1997, after legally changing her name to Riley Weston, she began claiming her date of birth as 1979 in order to be considered for further acting roles. The deception was assisted by her slight build, at 4 feet 11 inches (1.50 m) tall and weighing 93 pounds (42 kg).

In 1998, she began drafting screenplays and marketing herself to television studios as a recent high school graduate. She was soon hired by the WB Network as a writer for the show Felicity after they saw one of her scripts about teenage sisters. She was hailed as a child prodigy and "wunderkind" by publications such as Entertainment Weekly, which included her in its October 1998 list of the "100 Most Creative People in Entertainment", which described her as an up-and-coming 19-year-old. Shortly thereafter, she was offered a half-million dollar screenwriting deal with Disney. Series co-creator Matt Reeves cast her as a teenage character in one episode.

After Entertainment Tonight began working on a segment about Weston, her real age emerged. This occurred after Variety published an October 15, 1998 article reporting that it had obtained court documents showing that Weston had changed her name in 1997 from Kimberlee Elizabeth Kramer, and had been born in 1966 rather than 1979. The day the report was published, Weston admitted that she lied to professionals as well as in her personal relationships, and only her family and manager/ex-husband knew her true identity. She also created false identification documents and media reports speculated that Weston wore baggy clothes and brought her mother to auditions to help maintain the deception. Weston said, “I wore baggy clothes because I'm very insecure about my body and I brought my Mother to auditions because she is my best friend."

"The funny thing is I didn't lie to get the job on Felicity. I lied as an actor just to get in the door. Then suddenly I was on Felicity and thought 'now what do you do? It was a catch-22; I thought I'd just write for a little bit. I never thought I'd get a job on a show like this." United Talent Agency, which represented her at the time, was unaware of her real age, UTA's executive Chris Harbert told the LA Times. He said Hollywood's obsession with youth makes such masquerades common. "There are a million people who change their names and ages to get work in this town." Time Magazine wrote, "Any actress who can get away with trimming 13 years off her age without undergoing plastic surgery is bound to stir up some resentment."

Weston apologized for her deception, telling Daily Variety, "I take full responsibility. I'm completely sorry. I never meant to hurt anyone." She also explained her rationale for lying about her age, stating that it was "accepted practice for actresses to lie about their age", owing to "age bias" in the entertainment industry. Weston elaborated:"I wanted to have a job. I wanted to work as an actor, but if I'd go into a casting office to play a 15-year-old, and they’d say, 'How old are you?' and I said 30, they’d laugh. No one believes I'm 32...If they based (the deal) on my age, there’s an age problem in Hollywood. They bought into this, and there's something hugely wrong with it. Look at what I had to do. Someone has to put a stop to it. If I were getting a job in any other industry, do you think anyone would care how old I am or how I look?" She also stated that she changed her name partially for "security reasons" due to harassment by a stalker she had faced beginning in 1993.

Weston left Felicity in the middle of the first season after her contract had expired and was not renewed. Series co-creator Matt Reeves explained during a 2021 interview with Entertainment Weekly, "People thought that we let her go because of it. None of that was true at all. The story was blown so crazy out of proportion from the perspective of our relationship with Riley. We did discover that she was not telling us the truth, but it was after she had already finished her term. When you sign somebody on as a staff writer in those days, you had a number of scripts that you signed them to do. We just put her on the show because we thought, 'Well, let's just let her do what we know she really wants to do as well, which is to be an actor.' It got turned into a scandal that I'm not sure ever was. We liked her writing. That's all."

=== 1998–present ===
Weston settled in Tennessee, where she writes and performs country songs, often at the Nashville's Bluebird Café. She also continues to work as an actress, voiceover artist, and author. Weston's first novel, Before I Go, was published in September 2006. The book earned Weston a 2007 Independent Publisher (IPPY) award for Storyteller of the Year. Her debut novel received the 2007 New York Book Festival Grand Prize and was named Best Fiction.

She wrote the television film Apples, Orchards & Romance, which would air in September 2023 on Great American Family. She also wrote a song for the film, and at the time, was working on her first Christmas album.
