= Scott Speedman =

Canadian actor (born 1975)

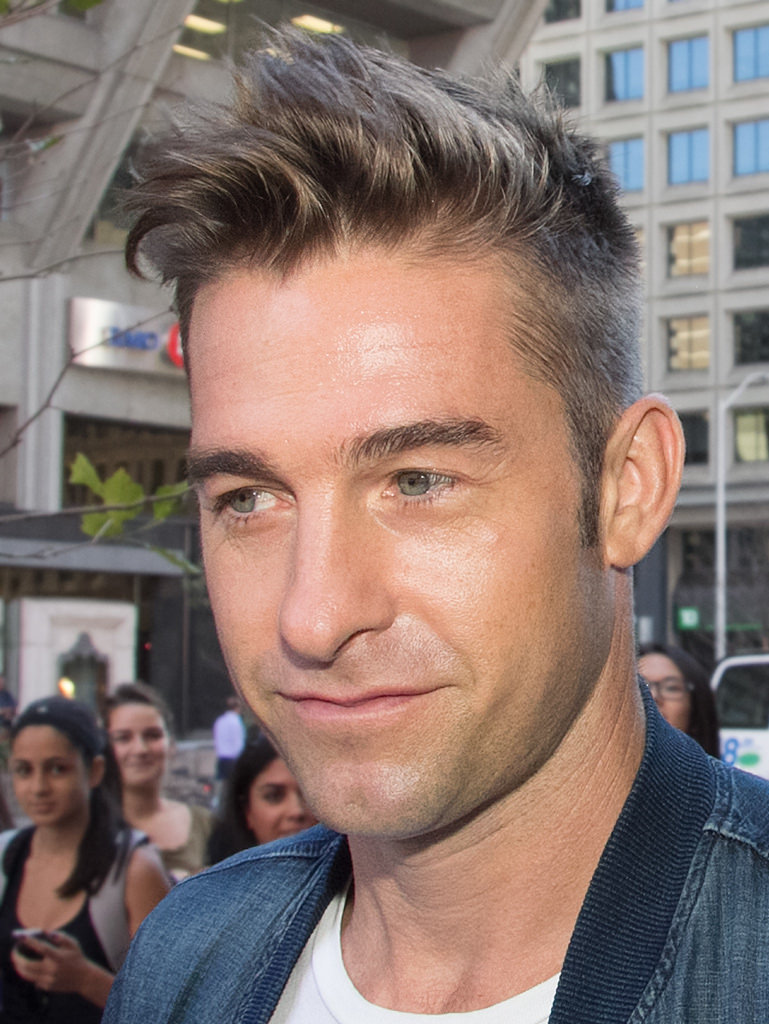
- Speedman at the 2014 Toronto International Film Festival
- Born: September 1, 1975 (age 51); Hammersmith, London, England
- Education: University of Toronto; York University
- Occupations: Actor; model
- Years active: 1995–present
- Children: 2

Robert Scott Speedman (born September 1, 1975) is a Canadian actor and model. He is known for portraying Ben Covington in the coming-of-age drama television series Felicity, Lycan–Vampire hybrid Michael Corvin in the gothic horror–action Underworld films, Barry "Baz" Blackwell in the TNT crime drama series Animal Kingdom, and the titular R.J. Decker in the ABC crime drama R.J. Decker. His other film work includes Duets, Dark Blue, XXX: State of the Union, The Strangers, Barney's Version, The Vow, and Crimes of the Future. In 2021, he returned to Grey's Anatomy as a main character following a guest role in season 14 as Dr. Nick Marsh.

== Early life ==
Speedman was born in London, to Scottish parents Mary (née Campbell), a primary school teacher and champion runner, and Roy Speedman (1944–1999), a department store buyer. His older sister, Tracey, died from cancer on February 8, 2016.

At the age of four, Speedman and his family moved to Toronto. He was a competitive swimmer who attended Earl Haig Secondary School's now-defunct gifted-athlete program. As a member of the Canadian Junior National Swim Team, Speedman placed ninth at the 1992 Olympic trials. Suffering a neck injury soon after, Speedman was forced to leave the sport. To find a new focus outside of athletics, he became interested in acting, and went on to attend the University of Toronto and York University to study his craft.

== Career ==
=== 1995–2000: Early career ===
Encouraged by a friend to appear on Speaker's Corner, a viewer open-forum run by Toronto's Citytv, Speedman expressed interest in auditioning for the role of Robin in the film Batman Forever, which was being cast in Toronto at the time. Though the appearance earned him an audition, Speedman was not cast in the role, which was ultimately given to Chris O'Donnell. The audition did, however, give Speedman the exposure he needed and he quickly arranged an agent and began auditioning for Canadian television and film roles.

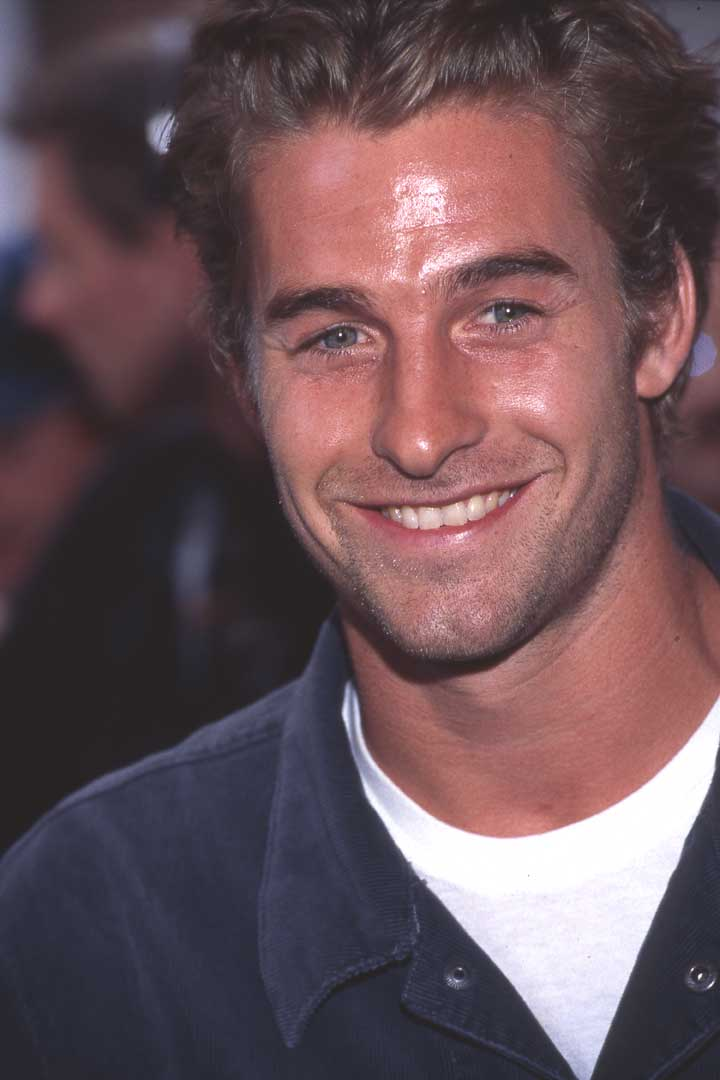
Speedman at the 2000 Toronto International Film Festival

Speedman made his television debut in 1995, appearing in an episode of the series Kung Fu: The Legend Continues, followed by a recurring role in the series Nancy Drew that same year. After appearing in several small TV roles, Speedman decided to go to New York City to study for a short time at the Neighborhood Playhouse before dropping out and returning home to Toronto. His big break came when he got a call from an American casting agent who wanted him to audition for a new series called Felicity. Portraying brooding college student Ben Covington opposite overnight star Keri Russell as Felicity, Speedman received much acclaim on the popular series. Soon after Felicity, Speedman began to get offers for more prominent roles while working on the series. In 2000, Speedman was given the role of Billy Hannan opposite Gwyneth Paltrow in the film Duets.

=== 2001–2012: Breakthrough ===
After ending a four-year run on Felicity, Speedman quickly found success in film. In 2002, he was cast in his first major starring role in a feature, portraying an inexperienced LAPD detective caught in a web of corruption, opposite Kurt Russell, in the police drama Dark Blue. Next, Speedman portrayed the husband of a terminally ill woman opposite fellow Canadian and high-school alumna Sarah Polley in the independent drama My Life Without Me. Speedman won a "Golden Wave Award" for his work on the film.

Later in 2003, Speedman starred opposite Kate Beckinsale in the supernatural thriller film Underworld. Making an impression on audiences in the stylized vampire–werewolf film, Speedman was honored with a Saturn Award in the category "Cinescape Face of the Future Award". Then, he went on to star alongside James Marsden in the thriller The 24th Day and Ice Cube in XXX: State of the Union. Upon the success of the first Underworld film, Speedman reprised his role as Michael Corvin in the 2006 sequel Underworld: Evolution. He appeared alongside Willem Dafoe in Anamorph and Wes Bentley in Weirdsville. Speedman also starred with Liv Tyler in the 2008 horror–thriller The Strangers, and alongside Rachel Blanchard in the mystery drama Adoration, directed by Atom Egoyan.

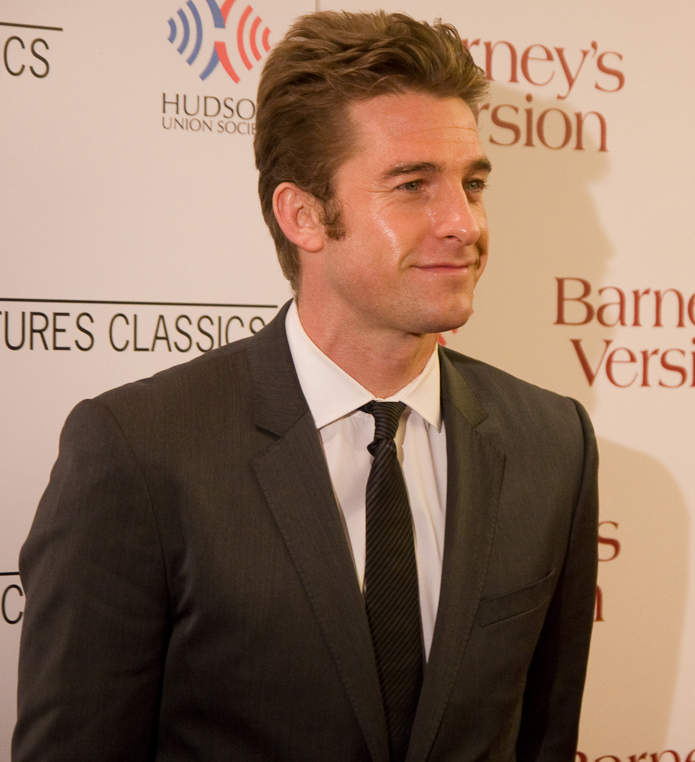
Speedman at the premiere of Barney's Version in January 2011

In July 2009, it was reported that Speedman was to star alongside Dustin Hoffman among others in the film adaptation of Barney's Version. Pre-production began in August 2009, and filming took place in Rome, New York and Canada. Speedman also starred in the independent Western The Last Rites of Ransom Pride alongside Lizzy Caplan and Dwight Yoakam. Archive footage of Speedman from the previous Underworld films was used in the 2012 & 2016 sequels, Awakening and Blood Wars; his facial likeness was superimposed on a stand-in for his character's brief role in the film. He had a supporting role as Jeremy in The Vow.

Speedman last starred as XO Sam Kendal in the ABC military drama series Last Resort, which premiered on September 27, 2012.

=== 2013–present: Independent films ===
In June 2013, Speedman was selected to star in Ryan Murphy's HBO production called Open alongside Wes Bentley. In 2014, he co-starred with Julia Stiles in Lluís Quílez Sala thriller film Out of the Dark. He starred in various independent films such as Barefoot (2014), The Captive (2014), and The Monster (2016).

He starred as Barry "Baz" Blackwell in the TNT crime drama series Animal Kingdom until the first episode of season 3. In 2018, he had a guest role on Grey's Anatomy as Dr. Nick Marsh, before becoming a series regular in season 18.

In October 2020, it was announced that Speedman had been cast in the recurring role of Matthew Engler on the third season of the Netflix thriller series You.

In September 2025, it was announced that Speedman had been cast in a major role for ABC series R.J. Decker.

== Personal life ==
Speedman is engaged to swimwear designer Lindsay Rae Hofmann. They have two children.

== Filmography ==
=== Film ===
Year	Title	Role	Notes
1997	Kitchen Party	Scott	
2000	Duets	Billy Hannan	
2002	Dark Blue	Detective Bobby Keough	
2003	My Life Without Me	Don	
2003	Underworld	Michael Corvin	Cinescape Genre Face of the Future Award – Male
2004	The 24th Day	Tom	
2005	XXX: State of the Union	NSA Agent Kyle Christopher Steele	
2006	Underworld: Evolution	Michael Corvin	
2007	Weirdsville	Dexter	
2007	Anamorph	Carl Uffner	
2008	Adoration	Tom	
2008	The Strangers	James Hoyt	Nominated—Teen Choice Award for Choice Movie Actor – Horror/Thriller
2010	Barney's Version	Bernard "Boogie" Moscovitch	
2010	The Last Rites of Ransom Pride	Ransom Pride	
2010	Good Neighbours	Spencer	
2011	The Moth Diaries	Mr. Davies	
2011	Citizen Gangster	Edwin Boyd	
2012	Underworld: Awakening	Michael Corvin	Archive footage and stand-in
2012	The Vow	Jeremy	
2014	Barefoot	Jay Wheeler	
2014	The Captive	Detective Jeffrey Cornwall	
2014	Out of the Dark	Paul Harriman	
2014	October Gale	William	
2016	The Monster	Roy	
2016	Underworld: Blood Wars	Michael Corvin	Archive footage only
2019	Run This Town	David	
2021	Best Sellers	Jack Sinclair	
2022	Sharp Stick	Vance Leroy	
2022	Crimes of the Future	Lang Dotrice	
2024	Cellar Door	John	

=== Television ===
Year	Title	Role	Notes
1995	Kung Fu: The Legend Continues	Cam Nillson	Episode: "Goodbye Mr. Caine"
1995	Nancy Drew	Ned Nickerson	5 episodes
1995	Net Worth	Rookie	Television film
1996	Goosebumps	Officer Madison	Episode: "Say Cheese and Die"
1996	A Brother's Promise: The Dan Jansen Story	Andy Gables	Television film
1996	Giant Mine	"Spanky" Riggs	Television film
1997	Dead Silence	Officer Stevie Cardy	Television film
1997	What Happened to Bobby Earl?	Steve Talbert	Television film
1997	Every 9 Seconds	Greg	Television film
1998	Rescuers: Stories of Courage: Two Couples	Patrick	Television film
1998–2002	Felicity	Ben Covington	Main role Nominated—Teen Choice Award for Choice TV Breakout Performance; Nominated—Teen Choice Award for Choice TV Actor; Nominated—Teen Choice Award for Choice TV Actor – Drama
2012–2013	Last Resort	XO Sam Kendal	Main role
2016–2018, 2022	Animal Kingdom	Barry "Baz" Blackwell	Main role (seasons 1–3); Guest role (season 6)
2018, 2021–present	Grey's Anatomy	Dr. Nick Marsh	Guest role (season 14); Main role (seasons 18–19); Recurring role (season 20–present)
2021	You	Matthew Engler	Recurring role
2024	Teacup	James Chenoweth	Main role
2026–present	R.J. Decker	R.J. Decker	Main role
2026	Running Point	Luke McShay	Guest star (season 2)
