= BWP (group) =

American hip hop group

- Also known as: Bytches With Problems
- Genres: Hip hop
- Years active: 1989–1994
- Labels: No Face/RAL/Chaos- Columbia Records
- Past members: Lyndah McCaskill; Tanisha Michele Morgan

BWP (Bytches With Problems) was an American female rap duo that consisted of Lyndah McCaskill and Tanisha Michele Morgan.

Both raised in Queens, New York. Lyndah McCaskill attended Andrew Jackson High School.

BWP are perhaps best known today for their controversial music video "Two Minute Brother" from their 1991 album The Bytches.

The content of BWP's music generally focused on the sexual and romantic experiences of black women as well as the experiences of black women and girls living in poverty. In their interviews, the group remained outspoken against patriarchy, colorism, and misogynoir. The group stood out from other rap acts at the time for the fact that their music was geared towards women. Many of their songs and music videos often began with skits that encapsulated the subject matter of the song. Their lyrics also focused on their frustration with the social and economic dynamics of patriarchy such as their 1991 hit, "We Want Money". In the words of McCaskill, "In any relationship women do a lot for a man, they cook, clean they may support him in any way possible and it's like, we deserve a break today". In addition to addressing the problems that existed for black women, the group also stated that they looked to provide solutions to these issues through their music.

Many women expressed their dissatisfaction with the groups use of the word bitch to refer to women. In an interview, Tanisha Morgan explained that the group was looking to redefine the term. In her words, "We look at [bitch] as a positive, strong, aggressive woman who goes after what she wants... if she gets called a bitch she should take it and wear it as a medal of honor. In another interview, Morgan stated that Bytches stood for "Beautiful Young Talented College Honeys" she went on to draw similarities to the way in which artists such as Richard Pryor redefined and repurposed the word nigger. In the same interview McCaskill also explained that due to catcalling, sexual and physical abuse, and the general disrespect that black women face, it is sometimes necessary "be a bitch" in order to command respect and not be taken advantage of.

== Career ==
The group became well known for their sexually explicit lyrics and were often referred to as a female version of 2 Live Crew. The group released the successful album, The Bytches. Its follow up album, 1993's Life's a Bytch was, however, never released.

In 1991, McCaskill and Morgan paid amateur videographer George Holliday $1,500 for the rights to use 10 seconds of the video he shot of L.A.P.D. officers beating Rodney King in their video for "Wanted." McCaskill said that "for years rappers have been talking about police brutality and no one has taken heed of it, or justice has never been done. No one's paid this issue any mind. So now that it's been taped, it's been caught in the act and visualized, it's in black and white...we truly hope people don't just forget about it a week later."

BWP made a cameo appearance in the 1992 romance comedy film, Strictly Business.

In 1993 BWP released their second studio album "Life's a Bitch" that featured their signature skits and sexually explicit lyrics. The album which was released under the Def Jam was never released The album can now be found on the video sharing platform YouTube. The group also had an unreleased song, "Mothers Day" which explored the experiences of being a single mother living on welfare. McCaskill's daughter who was six years old at the time was featured on the songs "Fuck a Man" and "Life's a Bitch".

The group was also depicted in the 1998 movie Bulworth. While Morgan was cast in the film as herself, another unknown actor was cast to play McCaskill.

Sometime after the recording of "Life's a Bitch", McCaskill and Morgan had a falling out and went years without speaking. The two later reunited in order to perform for the Queens of Rap tour.

Following her rap career, McCaskill attended Immaculata University where she earned a master's degree in counseling psychology in 2009. After earning her counseling license she went on to work with mental health patients, specifically focusing on drug and alcohol abuse. Having had her own struggles with mental health and drug abuse she states that "the people who helped me inspired me to help other people".

In a recent interview, McCaskill announced plans to release a multi-genre Christian music album. She expressed a desire to create Christian rap music that felt "up to date".

== Discography ==
Album information
The Bytches
- Released: February 19, 1991
- Chart positions: #34 Top R&B/Hip-Hop
- Last RIAA certification: Gold
- Singles: "Two Minute Brother", "We Want Money"
