= The Bytches =

Studio album by BWP
- Released: February 19, 1991
- Recorded: 1990
- Genre: Dirty Rap, Gangsta Rap, Hardcore Rap
- Language: English
- Label: No Face (Def Jam Columbia)
- Producer: Mark Sexx

Professional ratings
Review scores
Source	Rating
Allmusic	4.5/5 stars

The Bytches is the 1991 debut album by American female rap duo BWP. The album was released on February 19, 1991, by Columbia Records and was produced by Mark Sexx. The Bytches peaked at number 34 on the Billboard Top R&B/Hip-Hop Albums chart and features the single, "Two Minute Brother", which reached number six on the Hot Rap Singles chart. This was the only album released by the group, as their follow-up, Life's a Bytch, was shelved just days before its release in 1993. The album was unique at the time for the fact that it centered women's perspectives and experiences regarding issues like gender relations, systemic racism, and workplace discrimination.

== Controversy ==
The album's lyrics were oftentimes the source of controversy with many deeming them to be too sexually explicit, this was evident even before the release as Leor Cohen, head of Rush Associated Labels chose to remove a line from the album. "For 7½ years in this business, I've stretched all bounds of what people put on record...but this line goes above and beyond - it stretched my imagination beyond the breaking point." Though Cohen would not repeat the line or specify the song from which it was drawn, he justified his decision statiting, "It's far worse than anything on the Geto Boys' record". In response, producer and Co-Writer of the album Mark Sexx argued that "If it was the Geto Boys or 2 Live Crew saying that line, I'm sure it would be OK with him... but as soon as a woman starts saying it, it's a problem. That's sexism." McCaskill also echoed this statement, “It’s no worse than what’s on the No Face record. It’s an important line for the whole album, and I feel strongly it should be on there. It represents exactly what I’m about – someone who doesn’t take shit from anyone.” Sexx vowed an "all-out war" with the label stating, "Either the album includes the line or it doesn't come out. I'll sue for breach of contract."

Despite his discontent with the lyrics, Cohen believed that BWP's album was, "one of the truest recorded histories of urban teenage girls ever made." He also expressed the belief that "There are a lot more BWPs on the streets than Latifahs." The evidence and implications of this statement were never expanded upon.

Despite saying that BWP was his favorite rap group, in 1991 former Columbia Records executive Russel Simmons decided to remove the Columbia records label from the group's album The Bytches. In protest, Mark Sexx told the L.A. times, “I think they’re a bunch of hypocrites”. “If the album is a hit, they’re willing to take the money, but they’re not willing to take the heat/Whenever I ask anyone what’s going on, they say, ‘We don’t want to get any flak from this, so you can take responsibility. It it does well, it’ll really pump up your label." In response, Simmons explained that he didn't include the label's logo because it was, “important for the group to establish themselves on their own. Simmons insisted that, “We’re busting our ass trying to market that record,” he said. “I love BWP. It’s my favorite rap album! We don’t try to censor records. We try to sell them."

It was also rumored that some women working at Columbia chose not to be involved with the album. Simmons commented the issue stating, “There are black women at every label who wouldn’t think that group is funny. I’ve never had an argument with Columbia’s execs about lyrics."

== Track listing ==
1. "Comin' Back Strapped" – 6:13
2. "Wanted" – 5:31
3. "Cotex" – 4:53
4. "Is the Pussy Still Good?" – 6:22
5. "Two Minute Brother" – 5:12
6. "Fuck a Man" – 6:16
7. "A Different Category" – 4:01
8. "Shit Popper" – 5:10
9. "We Want Money" – 3:39
10. "No Means No" – 3:48
11. "Hit Man" – 4:38
12. "Teach 'Em" – 4:24
