= Tangi Miller =

American actress, model, dancer, producer, and director (born 1970)

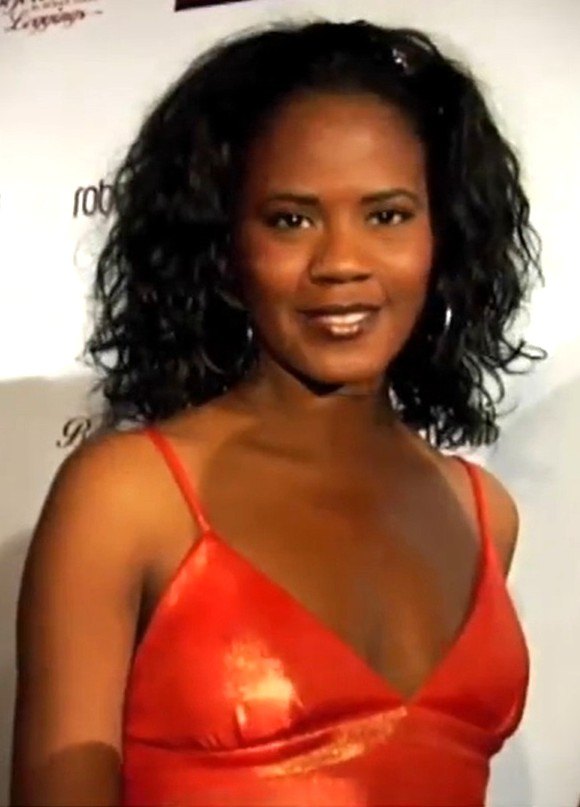
- Miller in 2009
- Born: February 28, 1970 (age 56); Miami, Florida, U.S.
- Occupations: Actress, model, dancer, director, producer
- Years active: 1996–present

Tangi Miller (born February 28, 1970) is an American actress, model, dancer, producer, and director. As an actress, she is known for the role of Elena Tyler on the television drama Felicity. Miller has received two NAACP Image Award nominations. Starting in the mid-2000s, Miller focused on indie films and has worked as a producer and director.

== Early life ==
Miller was born and raised in Miami, Florida, the eldest of six children. She and her siblings were not permitted to watch television as they grew up due to their parents' religious beliefs. At high school, Miller began acting in stage productions. She did not plan to become an actress and chose to major in marketing while attending Alabama State University.

Miller realized she spent all of her free time acting, so after graduation she pursued that at Alabama State. She earned a Master of Fine Arts degree at the University of California, Irvine. She studied at the Royal National Theatre in London, as well as at the Alabama Shakespeare Festival.

== Acting ==
After appearing on the HBO comedy Arli$$ (1996), and on the CBS drama Michael Hayes (1997), Miller was cast in The WB series Felicity (1998−2002), playing smart and stylish Elena Tyler, a premedical student. For her work on the series, Miller was nominated in 2002 for an NAACP Image Award in the category of Outstanding Actress in a Drama Series. She was named as one of TV Guide's Sexiest Faces. Miller was also featured in Ol' Dirty Bastard's music video of "Got Your Money" in 1999 as a dancer.

Miller played the lead role in BET movie Playing with Fire, starring opposite Vanessa Estelle Williams. She appeared alongside Mekhi Phifer in the independent film The Other Brother (2002). She was the wife of MC Hammer, Stephanie, in the 2001 VH1 film Too Legit: The MC Hammer Story. Miller was the lead in Leprechaun: Back 2 tha Hood and played Donna in Tyler Perry's Madea's Family Reunion (2006).

She portrayed the daughter of Claudette Wyms (CCH Pounder) on The Shield in 2002. In 2005, she earned her second NAACP Image Award nomination for Outstanding Actress in a Television Movie, Mini-Series or Dramatic Special for acting in sci-fi film Phantom Force. Miller appeared in guest roles on crime dramas The District (2003) and The Division (2004), as well as an appearance on sitcom Half & Half (2005), her latest acting role on television to date.

Following her role in Madea's Family Reunion, Miller has chiefly acted in independent films, including Hurricane in the Rose Garden, Guardian of Eden, Hollywood Chaos and Diva Diaries.

== Producer and director ==
Miller produced the Ghanaian film Police Officer 3 and the 2008 film After School. She produced her third film Love & Other 4 Letter Words in April 2006.

Miller's directorial debut was in 2017, for the film Diva Diaries — in which she also was producer and co-star. The film was first shown at the Pan African Film Festival in 2017.

== Filmography ==
=== Film ===
Year	Title	Role	Notes
1998	Rhinos	-	
2000	Playing with Fire	Camille Roberts	TV movie
2001	Too Legit: The MC Hammer Story	Stephanie	TV movie
2002	The Other Brother	Paula	
2003	Leprechaun: Back 2 tha Hood	Emily Woodrow	Video
2004	Phantom Force	Leanne Potts	TV movie
2004	Forever Is a Long, Long Time	Rochelle	Short
2006	Madea's Family Reunion	Donna	
2007	Love... & Other 4 Letter Words	Stormy La Rue	
2008	After School	Shonda	
2009	Hurricane in the Rose Garden	Sade	Video
2010	Drones	Miryam	
2010	My Girlfriend's Back	Nicki Russell	
2011	Fanaddict	Cheli Dayton	
2012	Guardian of Eden	Kimmy	
2012	The Good Life	Marianne Vandelay	
2013	The Love Section	Jackie Long	
2013	Hollywood Chaos	Camille Leone	
2014	Blood Lines	Grace	
2015	72 Hours	Monique	
2016	Diva Diaries	Sophia	
2017	Boxing Day: A Day After Christmas	Sophia Etim	
2020	Leroy	Toni	
2021	Entanglement	Cheryl	
2022	Black and White	-	

=== Television ===
Year	Title	Role	Notes
1998	Arli$$	-	Episode: "His Name Is Arliss Michaels"
1998–2002	Felicity	Elena Tyler	Main Cast
1999	Cousin Skeeter	-	Episode: "The Volcano"
2000	The Amanda Show	-	Episode: "2.16"
2002	The Shield	Rebecca Wyms	Episode: "Throwaway"
2002	Fastlane	Gina	Episode: "Girls Own Juice"
2002	The Twilight Zone	Ashley	Episode: "Harsh Mistress"
2002	Kim Possible	Editor (voice)	Episode: "All the News"
2003	The District	Dyanne	Episode: "Blind Eye" & "In God We Trust"
2004	The Division	Deena Bishop	Episode: "Hail, Hail, the Gang's ALl Here"
2004	Cold Case	Nora Lincoln	Episode: "The Badlands"
2005	Living With Fran	Cynthia	Episode: "The Reunion"
2005	Half & Half	Alana Mitchell	Episode: "The Big Sexism in the City Episode"
