= List of Parenthood characters =

This is a list of fictional characters in the NBC drama series Parenthood. The article deals with the series' main and recurring characters.

== Main cast ==
Actor	Character	Seasons					
Actor	Character	1	2	3	4	5	6
Peter Krause	Adam Braverman	Main	Main	Main	Main	Main	Main
Lauren Graham	Sarah Braverman-Holt	Main	Main	Main	Main	Main	Main
Dax Shepard	Crosby Braverman	Main	Main	Main	Main	Main	Main
Monica Potter	Kristina Braverman	Main	Main	Main	Main	Main	Main
Erika Christensen	Julia Braverman-Graham	Main	Main	Main	Main	Main	Main
Sam Jaeger	Joel Graham	Main	Main	Main	Main	Main	Main
Savannah Paige Rae	Sydney Graham	Main	Main	Main	Main	Main	Main
Sarah Ramos	Haddie Braverman	Main	Main	Main	Recurring	Special Guest	Special Guest
Max Burkholder	Max Braverman	Main	Main	Main	Main	Main	Main
Joy Bryant	Jasmine Trussell	Main	Main	Main	Main	Main	Main
Miles Heizer	Drew Holt	Main	Main	Main	Main	Main	Main
Mae Whitman	Amber Holt	Main	Main	Main	Main	Main	Main
Bonnie Bedelia	Camille Braverman	Main	Main	Main	Main	Main	Main
Craig T. Nelson	Ezekiel "Zeek" Braverman	Main	Main	Main	Main	Main	Main
Tyree Brown	Jabbar Trussell	Recurring	Main	Main	Main	Main	Main
Xolo Maridueña	Victor Graham			Guest	Main	Main	Main

== The Braverman family ==
The show revolves around the Braverman family, which has expanded to five generations, featuring parents Zeek and Camille Braverman, their oldest son Adam, his wife and three children, their daughter Sarah and her two children, their second son Crosby, his wife and their young son and infant daughter, and finally their daughter Julia, her husband and her daughter and son.

=== Family tree ===
Blanche Braverman (Frances Sternhagen)
Ezekiel "Zeek" Braverman (Craig T. Nelson)	Camille Braverman (Bonnie Bedelia)	Renee Trussell (Tina Lifford)
Kristina Braverman (Monica Potter)	Adam Braverman (Peter Krause)	{{{SH}}}	Sarah Braverman (Lauren Graham)	Hank Rizzoli (Ray Romano)	Sandy Rizzoli (Betsy Brandt)	Joel Graham (Sam Jaeger)	Julia Braverman (Erika Christensen)	Crosby Braverman (Dax Shepard)	Jasmine Trussell (Joy Bryant)
Haddie Braverman (Sarah Ramos)	Max Braverman (Max Burkholder)	Nora Braverman (Mia and Ella Allan)	Amber Holt (Mae Whitman)	Ryan York (Matt Lauria)	Andrew "Drew" Holt (Miles Heizer)	Ruby Rizzoli (Courtney Grosbeck)	Sydney Graham (Savannah Paige Rae)	Victor Graham (Xolo Maridueña)	Jabbar Trussell (Tyree Brown)	Aida Braverman
Ezekiel "Zeek" Holt (named after great-grandfather)

== The parents ==
=== Zeek Braverman ===
Ezekiel "Zeek" Braverman (Craig T. Nelson) is the patriarch of the Braverman family, Camille's husband and the father of Adam, Sarah, Crosby, and Julia. He has dabbled in various careers, including being a soldier in Vietnam, having graduated from West Point in the class of 1962 (although in the season two episode "A House Divided" he is shown telling his grandson Max about going into basic training at Fort Benning, Georgia, which would imply he was enlisted; also, he would have been 19 or 20 when graduating West Point), an activist hippie, an aspiring actor, and a shrewd entrepreneur, but none lasted more than a few years. He is 67 at the start of the series (as he is said to be turning 72 in season 6), making him four years older than his wife, Camille. In the first season, it is revealed that he made a bad investment, causing him and his wife, Camille, financial hardship. Later, it is also revealed that he had an affair. He doesn't get along with his mother, Blanche. She turns 86 in season three, which means that she was about seventeen when Zeek was born, as he would have been 69 in season three. Zeek's health begins to decline throughout season 6, and he endures two hospital stays. Zeek dies peacefully in his home an unknown time after Sarah's wedding to Hank as Camille is looking at photos taken by Max. His ashes are spread in the musical montage that begins the last scene of the series finale.

=== Camille Braverman ===
Camille Braverman (Bonnie Bedelia) is the matriarch of the family and Zeek's wife. She is an artist and also shows herself to be very capable domestically, striving to keep her family happy and peaceful. In season one, when Zeek reveals that he made a bad investment that he kept from Camille, she reveals that he was having an affair. Zeek later reveals that they both cheated. Camille confirms to her daughter, Sarah, that she has been having an affair with her art teacher, Matthew, but that she has ended it. In season one, it is stated that she has been married to Zeek for 46 years. She is 63 when the series begins, meaning she was about 17 when she married Zeek. She was 23 when she had Adam, 25 when she had Sarah, 28 when she had Crosby, and 31 when she had Julia.

After Zeek's death, she is shown as having traveled to France, to the place where Zeek had planned to take her as a surprise in an earlier episode. As she is shown in other scenes in the finale's final montage, she returns from her trip at some unknown point.

== Adam Braverman and his family ==
=== Adam Braverman ===
Adam Braverman (Peter Krause), age 40 at the beginning of the series, is Kristina's husband and the father of Max, Haddie, and Nora. He is the oldest Braverman child and all of his siblings and parents consult him in times of crisis. Adam is affable and dependable, and resolved to have a normal, happy family. Although usually in control, Adam punches a man who calls Max a "retard." Due to tensions with his boss at work, Adam was fired from the shoe company. After being unemployed and unable to find a new job, Adam goes into the music business with his brother Crosby, and together they open a recording studio called "The Luncheonette", formerly a working diner. In 2011, Adam and Kristina have their third child, a daughter named Nora. He is often shown struggling to deal with not only his own problems but those of the entire family. In season 6, when The Luncheonette business is slow, Adam takes time to teach the "culinary arts" class at Chambers Academy, the school Kristina starts. After The Luncheonette is broken into and robbed, Adam steps away from the business. After receiving an offer to re-enter the corporate world, Adam finds his passion in running Chambers Academy after Kristina begins working on opening more schools.

=== Kristina Braverman ===
Kristina Anna Nichols Braverman (Monica Potter) is Adam's wife, and a source of stability and support for anyone who needs it. She is portrayed as a typical soccer mom who works to keep her family happy. Official material from NBC characterises her as a "wise and quietly forceful woman who loves her husband and children deeply and with incredible strength." While she is always caring and nurturing, she can be high-strung and worried at times, perhaps as a result of raising a son with Asperger's syndrome. In season two, when Haddie moves in with Adam's parents for a few weeks, it is revealed that Kristina's parents ran away and married one another when they were 16. She mentions that her father made her mother miserable for her entire life. Although it has not been explored, it has been strongly hinted that Kristina's home life while growing up was far from ideal and she has expressed to Camille that she (Camille) was a substitute mother for her. She goes back to work to support her family during her husband's unemployment, then quits, but goes back to work after Adam tells her that Rachel, his assistant at the recording studio, kissed him. She forgives him for this transgression, despite Adam's refusal to fire Rachel. Kristina initially disapproved of her daughter's relationship with her recovering alcoholic boyfriend, but eventually came around. In the fourth season premiere, she was diagnosed with breast cancer and faced many hardships as a result, despite overwhelming support from her family. She fights it by the season finale, prompting her and Adam to take a well-deserved trip to Hawaii. After treatment she is told to be "cancer free". She also is asked to run Bob Little's campaign for Mayor of Berkeley. She rejects his offers and announces her campaign for the same office. In season five it is mentioned that she is from Cleveland, Ohio and is not entirely fond of the beach life of California. Kristina opens Chambers Academy in season six, named for her friend, Gwen Chambers, Kristina's friend and support that she met during chemotherapy who left a large (but unknown) endowment to Kristina that is used to fund the startup costs of Chambers Academy. Chambers offers education to students with learning difficulties who do not respond to general or special education settings. Kristina receives offers to open more schools like Chambers, handing control of the original school to Adam in the series finale.

=== Haddie Braverman ===
Haddie Braverman (Sarah Ramos) is Adam and Kristina's oldest child. She is 15 in the beginning of the series. She is a straight-A student who plays soccer and has several friends; she aspires to be the quintessential "good girl" to compensate for her brother's behavioral problems. As the show progresses, however, she begins to assert her independence and experiment with boys and drugs. In Season 2, she volunteers in a soup kitchen where she meets Alex. They become romantically involved, but her parents object to their relationship because they feel Alex is too mature for her, with too many "grown-up" problems (he is a recovering alcoholic who left an abusive home and lives alone). Her parents' opposition to their relationship, as well as removing her right to privacy, causes Haddie to move out to live with her grandparents. The conflict is eventually resolved when Haddie returns home, and Adam and Kristina grant her permission to continue seeing her boyfriend. She loses her virginity to Alex the night of her junior prom. On another occasion, her parents find out she is having sex when she misdials them during sex. During the beginning of the third season, Alex gets arrested and charged with assault after punching another man at a party. Haddie feels personally responsible since he was only there to pick her up. Alex soon ends the relationship with her even after the charges are dropped because he feels that they are too different. She dedicates the rest of her senior year to school, and gets accepted into Cornell. She leaves during the first episode of the fourth season, and returns briefly to visit after learning of her mother's breast cancer diagnosis. To prevent her from worrying, Haddie's parents tell her the cancer is benign and send her back to Cornell to live her dream college experience. At the end of season 5, she returns home for a visit with family with her friend Lauren. Max sees Haddie kissing Lauren, and Haddie soon announces that she is in a same-sex relationship with Lauren. Haddie returns for the series finale; no mention is made of her relationship status.

=== Max Braverman ===
Max Braverman (Max Burkholder) is Adam and Kristina's son (age 8 in the series pilot episode, although he is 14 in season 5) who is diagnosed with Asperger's syndrome at the beginning of the first season. His struggles and triumphs with this syndrome affect much of what happens in his family. Max is unaware of his diagnosis in the early episodes (although he is enthusiastic about participating in a "Walk for Autism"), but during the second season he learns about it after witnessing an argument between Adam and Crosby.

His parents decide to transfer him to a mainstream school after being told that Max is very intelligent. In the season 2 finale, while at the hospital Max becomes very angry, saying that he wants pancakes more than he cares about Amber, even going as far as saying that doesn't care about her. Adam scolds Max for his hurtful comments, but Max believes he didn't do anything wrong, though at the end he apologizes to Sarah for what he said. In season 3, Max has been mainstreamed into a normal school, to challenge him academically. He is trying hard to make friends, though it proves difficult. He does make a friend in season 3, a boy with spina bifida named Micah, whose parents are thrilled because, like Max, he's never had a friend before. It is also discovered that Max is academically gifted. Though socially behind others his age, he is academically far above most others his age and older.

In the fourth season, he is elected class president of Cedar Knoll Middle School with some help from his older sister Haddie. He is often shown to get along well with and prefer to be with his cousin Amber rather than his sister Haddie because Amber, given her own personal struggles, has a greater understanding of his condition. Max develops a mentor relationship with Hank Rizzoli, developing an interest in photography. Hank and Max connect as they both deal with the struggles of living with Asperger's Syndrome. Max finds success in photography and sees it as a future career. Max struggles with mainstream middle school. During an overnight school trip, other students bully him and Adam and Kristina need to take him home early. In response, Kristina creates a charter school, Chambers Academy, for students with learning difficulties who do not respond to general or special education settings. Max graduates from Chambers Academy in the series finale.

=== Nora Braverman ===
Nora Braverman (Mia and Ella Allan), the youngest of Adam and Kristina's three children, was born in late 2011. Her father Adam was negotiating a huge business deal at the time of her birth and was unable to get phone signal coverage; as a result, his brother, Crosby, helped Adam's wife deliver the child.

== Sarah Braverman and her family ==
=== Sarah Braverman-Holt ===
Sarah Tracey Braverman (Lauren Graham), age 38 at the beginning of the series, is the second child and oldest daughter. She and her two children (Amber and Drew) move back into her parents' house in the pilot episode because of her financial situation. At the show's beginning, it is established that she had previously worked as a bartender for over ten years and as a graphic artist for local bands, including her ex-husband's. She is divorced from her rocker husband Seth (John Corbett), who appears to have been a very poor father figure to their children due to his drug use, alcoholism, and touring schedule. They were married for 12 years. After she fails to obtain a job with a design company due to her lack of a college degree, Sarah once again takes a bartending job. However, she soon begins an internship position at the same company where her older brother, Adam, works. She starts dating her boss despite her brother's disapproval. However, she eventually leaves him when she finds out that he sold the company without the knowledge of its employees. One night, she writes a play which her father passes to his friend, who is well-connected in Broadway. Her play is later produced. She turns 40 in the third season, which means she had her 17-year-old daughter, Amber, when she was 23 and Drew when she was 25. Sarah rekindles her relationship with Mark Cyr, who is 12 years her junior, after revealing to Amber that she is falling in love with him. In the last episode of season three, Mark proposes to Sarah and it is revealed in the first episode of the fourth season that she accepted. Sarah goes to work for photographer Hank Rizzoli. In season 4, episode 10, "Trouble in Candyland", Mark breaks up with Sarah because of her habit of running away from things that make her feel good about herself. This happens after Sarah puts her job before Mark when she turned down going to a wedding with him so she could accompany her boss to a photography job in Los Angeles. In season five she becomes the superintendent of an apartment building before becoming Hank's photography partner full-time. Hank and Sarah marry in the series finale.

=== Seth Holt ===
Seth Holt (John Corbett) is Sarah's rocker ex-husband and Amber and Drew's absent father. Seth is a traveling musician and has never made much time for either of his children. Sarah left Seth due to his chronic problems with drugs and alcohol, and she constantly had to lie to her children regarding his long absences, saying he was away on tour. He shares a bond with his son Drew, who visits him during the "Pilot." Seth calls Drew on Thanksgiving after Zeek leaves him a voicemail. Seth comes back to town and bonds with Drew again. After Drew tells Sarah that Seth is back in town, she visits him and the two talk. Seth reveals that he has been sober for the last nine months, and Sarah finally lets Drew and Amber see him. While Drew has a good relationship with Seth, Amber is less forgiving and resents her father for never being there. Eventually, Seth leaves to go back on tour. Seth visits Sarah while he is drunk, and she attempts to help him get sober. Seth finally agrees to admit himself to rehab, and he and Sarah get closer again even though she is in a committed relationship with Mark Cryr. After Seth gets clean, he kisses Sarah, but she breaks it off. Amber asks Seth to leave after overhearing Sarah talk about the kiss. Seth leaves to stay with his cousin Eric in Tahoe, leaving packages of birthday cards for both Amber and Drew to make up for all the birthdays he missed through the years. Later in the season, Sarah calls to tell Seth that she and Mark are trying to have a baby, which upsets him. Seth helps a very drunk Amber through her breakup with her fiancé, Ryan. It is shown that Seth is finally able to support himself with a job and house. He and Sarah chat later on about how he's doing over the phone. Seth sends Amber a baby crib to assemble once he discovers that she is pregnant.

=== Hank Rizzoli ===
Hank Rizzoli (Ray Romano) is a photographer who is hired by the Braverman family for a family picture in season four. Sarah ultimately becomes Hank's assistant. While at first he disliked Sarah, the two begin a relationship that has problems as Sarah still has feelings for Mark Cyr. In season five, Hank begins a mentor-mentee relationship with Max and teaches him about photography. After spending time with Max, and reading a book about Asperger syndrome that Adam lent him (after one of Max's outbursts), Hank begins to realize that he shares many social qualities with Max and that he may have Asperger syndrome himself. Hank has a daughter, Ruby, from his previous marriage. When Amber is upset because Ryan York, her ex-fiancé, is involved in an accident, Hank offers to drive Amber the long distance to see Ryan. In season six, after Sarah and Hank move in together, Hank begins to bond with Amber and Drew. He helps Amber assemble her crib and asks Drew to be his best man. Hank and Sarah marry in the series finale.

=== Amber Holt ===
Amber Holt (Mae Whitman), age 16 at the beginning of the series, is Sarah's rebellious, willful, and not very studious daughter who is seeking direction in life. She resents her move from Fresno, particularly after her mother thwarts her efforts to stay by moving in with her boyfriend. She resents her father's drug use and abandonment more than her brother does because she claims that she can remember the hard times better than he can. At one point, she and her mother and brother were living in a motel together to be away from their father. She shows musical inclination and is a talented guitar player and songwriter.

Toward the end of the second season, despite receiving a 2250 on her SATs and having a successful interview with a Berkeley alumna, Amber learns that she has been rejected from both colleges she applied to and has to decide what to do with her life. Following a path of drinking and drug abuse with her new friend, Gary (a coworker at Julia's law firm, where Amber briefly worked), the couple is violently T-boned by an SUV. Amber is critically injured but recovers and decides to start over. She then moves out of her grandparents' house and into her own apartment, but her relationships with her family, in particular her mother, remain intact. In season three, she works at a coffee shop before her aunt Kristina offers her an assistant position for Bob Little's political campaign. Amber is promoted to be Bob Little's assistant but then has a fling with him; Kristina discovers this and is disappointed with her (and loses trust in Little).

In season four, she starts working as a receptionist at the Luncheonette, her uncles' recording studio. At her cousin Victor Graham's baseball game, she meets Ryan York, a young Afghanistan war veteran. The two start a relationship and are shown to be fairly steady for several episodes. However, after a heated argument about his drinking habits and poor decision-making, Amber breaks up with Ryan because he reminds her too much of her own father, who abandoned her family prior to the series. The two reconcile in the fourth-season finale and are shown to be very happy.

In the first episode of season five, Ryan proposes to Amber after he returns from a third tour of duty in Afghanistan. She accepts the proposal. He buys her a very expensive engagement ring that she is uncomfortable accepting since he used all his money from the army to purchase it. This leads to tension between the couple. Ryan becomes upset when he feels as though a member of the band that the Luncheonette is recording is flirting with Amber, and when he picks her up from a bar, he gets into a fight with one of the guys, leading to his being arrested. The band decides not to press charges, but Amber is not sure where their relationship stands, especially after Crosby and Adam ask that Ryan not come around the Luncheonette for a while. After a talk with her grandfather, she tells Ryan that she loves him and wants to work through things and have a family with him. However, he tells her that he has reenlisted in the army. He ends their engagement, which leads to Amber going on a bender. One night, she ends up at a bar where her father works. After getting into an altercation with a man at the bar, she vents her frustrations at her father (who prevents her from driving home), claiming she is like him; however, she stays the night at her father's place and reconnects with him; he says she's not like him but is like her mother. Ryan later gets hurt and is discharged, and Amber goes to visit him in the hospital, but Ryan's mother shows up and insists he return to Wyoming.

Later, Amber finds out she is pregnant with Ryan's child. However, she exhibits a strong want to raise the child on her own without his help (especially after talking with Drew, who drove her to Wyoming so she could give the news to Ryan and refused to leave her there). In the penultimate episode of the series, Amber gives birth to a son, whom she names Ezekiel (Zeek) after her grandfather. Because she is struggling in her small apartment, Zeek and Camille invite Amber and her baby to move in with them, to which she happily agrees. After an undisclosed amount of time, Amber is now married to a man with whom she has a young daughter, while Ryan remains a part of his son's life.

=== Drew Holt ===
Andrew "Drew" Holt (Miles Heizer) is Sarah's son, age 14 at the beginning of the series. He is characterized as sensitive and longs for a male role model. Brief glimpses of Seth (Drew's absentee father) and statements by Sarah indicate that Drew has suffered much disappointment at the hands of his dad. As a result, he has become sullen and withdrawn. Drew regularly seeks romantic advice from the male figures in his life, Zeek and Adam. Drew plays baseball in the first two seasons, with Adam's help, and shows Max how to catch a fly ball.

During the third season, Drew develops a relationship with Amy, a girl introduced to him by his grandfather during a yard sale. The relationship with his new girlfriend, Amy, helps him to become less aloof and break the shell of his social inhibitions. He is shown having trouble adjusting to his mother's relationship with Mark Cyr, a teacher at his high school. In the season three finale, Drew and Amy sleep together for the first time, while his family celebrates Crosby and Jasmine's wedding outside. During the beginning of the fourth season, Amy breaks up with Drew after meeting someone else over the summer. They try to stay friends, but later get back together after Amy learns of his aunt's cancer. They are caught having sex by Mark, who tells Drew's mother. Amy eventually ends up pregnant. She, however, has an abortion and decides it is best for her to stay single.

At the end of season four, Drew is accepted into the University of California, Berkeley. At the beginning of season five, Drew is having problems with his roommate Berto because he is constantly kicking Drew out of their dorm so he can hookup with girls. Ryan "intimidates" Berto, solving the problem. Drew begins a friends with benefits relationship with a girl on his floor named Natalie (Lyndon Smith). He talks to her about them becoming a couple, which she doesn't want to do. Drew's high school girlfriend, Amy, shows up at his dorm room door, and stays for a few weeks, admitting that she hates Tufts and is having a hard time. When Amy shows up, Natalie shows that she's jealous of their relationship. After Amy leaves, Drew avoids Natalie and Berto for a while when he finds they hooked up, and Drew stays at Amber's on the couch for a while. Eventually Drew returns to campus, voices his issues with Berto (per Berto's suggestion), and Drew and Natalie get back together. At the end of the school year, Natalie returns to Portland, Oregon and Drew soon follows in the Pontiac GTO his grandfather gives him.

In season six, Drew drives Amber to Wyoming so she can share the news of her pregnancy with Ryan, but Drew prevents her from staying with Ryan. Drew chooses economics as a major, feeling that he needs to make money to support Amber. He also takes Zeek on various "missions", and is afraid that Zeek will die (of his heart attack) remembering how Drew let him down on one "mission". Drew connects with Hank, who chooses Drew to be his best man at Hank's wedding with his mother.

=== Ryan York ===
Ryan York (Matt Lauria) is a young soldier who develops a relationship with Amber. In early season four Ryan meets Zeek at a VA support group and they eventually become good friends. Later, Ryan meets Amber, Zeek's granddaughter, and the two strike up a friendship. The two are instantly attracted to each other, which the rest of the Braverman family notices. Eventually, Amber and Ryan begin dating and are happy. Amber notices that he can be a little violent and impulsive, but she ignores those who say that Ryan is troubled from his time in war. However, near the end of Season 4, Ryan is called back to his base, and he and Amber say goodbye.

In the Season 5 premiere, Ryan comes home to Amber and upon seeing her, decides to spontaneously propose. She accepts, and the two begin planning their wedding. They reveal the news to Amber's mother, Sarah, who does not like the idea at first but warms up to it gradually. Initially, Ryan suggests that they just get married at a courthouse, but they ultimately decide that they will get married in front of Amber's family by the lake. When Amber and Sarah question why Ryan's family won't be attending the wedding, he lies and says that they won't be able to make it. However, it is later discovered that his relationship with his mother is strained, and his father is dead. After Amber begins working at the Luncheonette with the band, Ashes of Rome, she spends more time there than with Ryan. He feels that she is very distant and not really with him anymore. He decides to reenlist in the army and tells Amber, breaking their engagement. At the end of Season 5, Ryan gets into a car crash while drunk driving. Amber and his mother visit him, and Amber realizes that Ryan never told his mother about their former engagement. Amber and Ryan sleep together before Amber departs.

Ryan is now living in Wyoming with his mother since he has been medically discharged from the army. His house is very small and messy, and it can be assumed that he doesn't do much each day. Amber visits him one day to reveal that she is pregnant with their child. He is thrilled and promises that he will be there for their baby. Amber is tempted to stay in Wyoming and take care of Ryan, but she decides that it is not best for the baby. In the series finale's flash-forward scene, Ryan is seen coming into Amber and Amber's husband's house. Ryan is bringing their son, Zeek (named after Amber's grandfather), home, while he and Amber are on friendly terms.

=== Zeek Holt ===
Ezekiel "Zeek" Holt is the son of Amber Holt and Ryan York. He is born at the end of the penultimate episode of the series and is named after his great-grandfather.

== Julia Braverman and her family ==
=== Julia Braverman-Graham ===
Julia Braverman-Graham (Erika Christensen) is Sydney and Victor's mother, Joel's wife, and Zeek and Camille's fourth and youngest child and second daughter. She is a lawyer at a top corporate firm while her husband, Joel, supports her ambitions by serving as a stay-at-home dad to their daughter. Julia is sometimes competitive and it is difficult for her to let go and relax. Julia's go-getting personality and by-the-book approach is the opposite of her sister Sarah's, but they turn to one another for support. During the second season, Joel and Julia are celebrating their eight-year anniversary. After unsuccessfully trying to conceive a second child, Julia is told she has scarring in her uterus and that it will be extremely difficult for her to conceive again. Julia and Joel decide to adopt a young boy named Victor. During the fourth season, after missing Sydney's dance recital and Victor's first baseball game, as well as a discovery deadline for the law firm (a costly mistake for the firm), she quits her job at the firm. She then attempts to become a stay-at-home mom while Joel goes back to work.

In season five, Julia begins to struggle with staying at home and feeling out of place. She begins a friendship with Ed, a dad at her children's school, and it begins to turn into an emotional affair. Eventually she sees the dangers and goes to break it off, but instead they kiss. Later in the season, after separating with Joel over her relationship with Ed, Julia has a one-night stand with Mr. Knight, the headmaster of Adam and Kristina's charter school (which Julia helped them get approval for). In the final season, Julia has a relationship with Chris, whom she used to date in college, and she works at the law firm where Chris works. But their relationship suffers because she cannot cut ties with Joel. Julia and Joel are able to work things out and mend their relationship and are surprised to learn that Victor's birth mother has given birth to a baby girl with a different men and offers Julia and Joel the chance to adopt her. After an undisclosed amount of time, it is revealed that not long after adopting Victor's sister, Julia gave birth to a son. They are all seen celebrating Christmas together as one big, happy family.

=== Joel Graham ===
Joel Graham (Sam Jaeger) is Julia's husband and Sydney and Victor's father. He is a stay-at-home father, and is popular among the stay-at-home mothers in their social circle at Sydney's school, a fact which sometimes puts strains on his marriage. He is shown to be very capable domestically and hosts a regular playdate that is very popular. Though he's 100% committed to the job of raising his daughter, he sometimes finds himself starved for adult interaction. He is a licensed contractor and he and Julia agreed that he would stay home with Sydney after he couldn't afford to keep paying his crew. In season two, it is revealed that his mother died when he was younger, something that affects his faith and belief in an afterlife. In the season finale of season 3, Julia and Joel adopt a young boy named Victor. In season 4, Julia becomes a stay-at-home mom while Joel returns to work as a contractor. In season 5, Joel moves into his own apartment because he can't cope with her emotional affair with Ed, a parent Julia volunteers with at the school, which leads to him kissing her. It is also revealed during their separation that his father cheated on his mother, which may be the reason why Julia's behavior is affecting him so much. In the final season, Joel and Julia are able to mend their broken relationship and adopt Victor baby sister. Soon after, it is revealed that Julia has given birth to a son.

=== Sydney Graham ===
Sydney Graham (Savannah Paige Rae) is Julia and Joel's daughter, and is five years old in the first season. With Joel at home with her full-time, Sydney has become a "daddy's girl," which causes Julia anxiety about finding significant bonding time with her little girl. She has been identified as being gifted. In the fourth season, she begins to have jealous feelings towards her new brother, Victor, when she feels that he's getting more attention from their parents. In the sixth season, she is accused of "bullying" at school (likely due to the uncertainty of whether or not her parents will get back together), has a generally bad attitude, and gives an insincere apology to the girl she allegedly excludes.

=== Victor Graham ===
Victor Graham (Xolo Maridueña) is Julia and Joel's 10-year-old "sky baby" adopted son. He is introduced at the end of the Season 3 finale. He's cold towards his new family at first, and does not listen to either of his adoptive parents. Victor begins to warm up to them in the fourth season, by joining a baseball team and playing catch with Joel, as well as baking cookies with Julia. However, after an argument with Sydney, he purposely throws a baseball bat through a window, nearly hitting his sister. This prompts Julia to reconsider going through with the adoption, much to Joel's dismay, but they later decide to finalize the adoption. Victor struggles in school, eventually being put back a grade. In the final episode, his parents decide adopt his biological maternal half-sister, Millie.

== Crosby Braverman and his family ==
=== Crosby Braverman ===
Crosby Braverman (Dax Shepard) is 35 years old at the beginning of the series, unmarried, third child and second son. He works as a small-time record producer. When the show opens, his longtime girlfriend, Katie, is pressuring him to settle down and start a family, an idea he is resistant to as he enjoys his freewheeling bachelor lifestyle. Unexpectedly, his former lover, Jasmine, introduces Crosby to his five-year-old son, Jabbar, in the pilot episode. In season 2, Crosby and Jasmine are engaged, but he begins to feel Jasmine is too controlling, citing her desire to have "a big family" and eventually a house while not actually discussing her desires with him. When he confronts her, they have an argument and he moves back into his houseboat while Jasmine asks that they "figure things out." During this period Crosby sleeps with Max's behavioral aide, Gaby. He tells Jasmine, and upon hearing the news she leaves him. Crosby begs for Jasmine's forgiveness, but towards the end of the second season, Jasmine tells him she doesn't think she can forgive him for cheating on her and she has decided to move on. Crosby is determined to get her back. In the season 2 finale Crosby tells Jasmine that he is done pursuing her if she truly feels that this was the end of their relationship. Seeing this as a mature sign she comes back to visit Crosby and his new house. At the end of season 3, Crosby and Jasmine get married. He and his brother, Adam, run the Luncheonette, a recording studio. Crosby plays poker with cast members of About a Boy.

=== Jasmine Trussell Braverman ===
Jasmine Trussell (Joy Bryant) is a dancer, the mother of Crosby's son Jabbar, and Crosby's eventual wife. After several attempts to contact Crosby, she kept Jabbar a secret from him until Jabbar was five years old, and wanted to meet his dad. She also falsely tells her own family that Crosby had abandoned her and Jabbar for that time period, because her own father disappeared on her family when she was only four years old. She is very close with her mother, Renee, and her brother, Sekou. She breaks up with Crosby when he cheats on her with Gaby, behavioural aide to his nephew, Max. In the season two finale, it appeared that she and Crosby might reconcile, however, they did not. She subsequently dates her son's pediatrician, Dr. Joe. She appears jealous when Crosby is in a relationship with a cellist from the Luncheonette. In the season three finale, she marries Crosby. By the end of season four, Jasmine reveals that she is pregnant with her and Crosby's second child, a daughter named Aida, who is born at the start of season five. In the series finale she is shown pregnant with another child.

=== Jabbar Trussell Braverman ===
Jabbar Trussell (Tyree Brown) is Jasmine and Crosby's son. He is five years old during the show's first season. He is recurring in season one, but is promoted to a regular role for all subsequent seasons.

=== Aida Braverman ===
Aida is Crosby and Jasmine's second child who was born at the start of season five.

== Recurring cast ==
=== Recurring cast table ===
Actor	Character	Seasons					
Actor	Character	1	2	3	4	5	6
Erinn Hayes	Racquel	Recurring					
Marguerite Moreau	Katie	Recurring					
Tom Amandes	Dr. Pelikan	Recurring	Guest			Recurring	
Mike O'Malley	Jim Kazinsky	Recurring					
Eduardo Rioseco	Damien	Recurring					
Phil Abrams	Phil Lessing	Recurring	Recurring	Guest	Guest		
Amanda Foreman	Suze Lessing	Recurring	Recurring	Guest	Guest		
Nicholas Lobue	Noel Lessing	Recurring	Recurring				
Jason Ritter	Mark Cyr	Recurring	Guest	Recurring	Recurring	Guest	Guest
Minka Kelly	Gaby	Guest	Recurring				
Asher Book	Steve Williams	Recurring					
Tina Lifford	Renee Trussell	Guest	Recurring	Guest	Recurring	Guest	Guest
William Baldwin	Gordon Flint		Recurring				
Kevin Alejandro	Mike		Recurring				
Michael B. Jordan	Alex		Recurring	Recurring			
Anthony Carrigan	Cory Smith		Recurring				
Richard Dreyfuss	Gilliam T. Blount		Recurring				
Rosa Salazar	Zoe DeHaven			Recurring			
Skyler Day	Amy Ellis			Recurring	Recurring	Recurring	
D. B. Woodside	Dr. Joe Prestridge			Recurring			
Alexandra Daddario	Rachel			Recurring			
Unknown baby / Mia and Ella Allan	Nora Braverman			Recurring	Recurring	Recurring	Recurring
Hayden Byerly	Micah Watson			Guest	Recurring	Guest	
Jonathan Tucker	Bob Little			Recurring		Recurring	
Courtney Ford	Lily			Recurring			
Ray Romano	Hank Rizzoli				Recurring	Recurring	Recurring
Rose Abdoo	Gwen Chambers				Guest	Recurring	
Kurt Fuller	Dr. Bedsloe				Recurring	Guest	
Courtney Grosbeck	Ruby Rizzoli				Recurring	Guest	Recurring
Betsy Brandt	Sandy Rizzoli				Guest		Recurring
Tyson Ritter	Oliver Rome					Recurring	Guest
Josh Stamberg	Carl Fletcher					Recurring	
Sonya Walger	Meredith Peet					Recurring	
David Denman	Ed Brooks					Recurring	
Jurnee Smollett-Bell	Heather Hall					Recurring	
Nick Krause	Chad "Berto" Roberto					Recurring	
Lyndon Smith	Natalie					Recurring	Recurring
Coby Ryan McLaughlin	Chris Jefferies						Recurring
Leland Crooke	Dr. Leland Gordon						Recurring
Ally Ioannides	Dylan Jones						Recurring
Isaac Salzman	Aaron Brownstein						Recurring
Andy Ames	Edgar						Recurring

=== Recurring character descriptions ===
- Racquel (Erinn Hayes) is an attractive supermom whose comfortable relationship with Joel and Sydney rubs Julia the wrong way. Racquel had attempted to kiss Joel in the past, but Joel turned her down. She has one daughter, Harmony, who was best friends with Joel and Julia's daughter, Sydney. For both of their daughters to continue their close relationship, Joel overlooks the situation and pretends the kiss never happened.
- Katie (Marguerite Moreau) was Crosby's girlfriend, who was putting pressure on Crosby to settle down and start a family. She was unaware of Jasmine and Jabbar until the fifth episode. She ended her relationship with Crosby after he revealed his secret about having a son. Although she was upset that he had been secretly spending time with Jabbar for a month and a half, she was more hurt that he did not introduce Jabbar to her when they met at the recording studio.
- Dr. Pelikan (Tom Amandes) is the doctor that diagnosed Max Braverman with Asperger's and is giving the family guidance on coping with his condition. Kristina refers Julia to Dr. Pelikan when Julia thinks her daughter may also have Asperger's Syndrome. However, Dr. Pelikan tells Julia that Sydney is gifted and acts out because she is simply bored. In season 5, Hank Rizzoli sees Dr. Pelikan when Hank suspects he has Asperger's Syndrome.
- Jim Kazinsky (Mike O'Malley) was Sarah's high school sweetheart. Julia sets them up on a date in the series premiere. They have a brief on again, off again relationship in season 1. Although Jim works as a coffee house barista, he is also a well known poetry writer.
- Damien (Eduardo Rioseco) was Amber's boyfriend in Fresno, who Amber wants to live with in the series premiere, but Sarah forcibly prevents it. He briefly comes to Berkeley to see Amber, despite the fact that Sarah and Zeek dislike him. Amber eventually tells Damien to return to Fresno.
- Phil Lessing (Phil Abrams) is married to Suze Lessing and father of Noel, a child diagnosed with Asperger's.
- Suze Lessing (Amanda Foreman) is married to Phil Lessing.
- Noel Lessing (Nicholas Lobue) is Phil and Suze Lessing's son who has Asperger's, and requires constant stimulation and food.
- Mark Cyr (Jason Ritter) is Amber's English teacher who has a brief relationship with Sarah. Mark helps Amber study for the SAT after school hours; Amber likely had a crush on Mr. Cyr, so Sarah decides to postpone her relationship with him because it hurt Amber's feelings, and Sarah wants to focus on her family. Sarah and Mark restart their relationship after Sarah asked Mark to read a story she wrote (which Mark said was a play that needed an Act II). The relationship continues, and Sarah and Drew move in with Mark, until season 4, episode 10 "Trouble in Candyland", where Mark breaks up with Sarah because he thought she was getting involved with her boss Hank Rizzoli, and due to her habit of running away from things that make her feel good about herself. Later in season 4, he decides to fight for her, but she decides to try to make it work with Hank. Sarah and Mark meet and talk on friendly terms at various times thereafter.
- Gaby (Minka Kelly) was Max's behavioral aide. Kristina is initially threatened by Gaby's ability to get through to Max. However, Kristina eventually confides in Gaby after having a breakdown. Adam finds Gaby partying at a Mexican restaurant and taking many shots of tequila; he is amazed that Gaby shows up to work the next day without a hair out of place. She befriends Crosby, and ends up sleeping with him; in the aftermath, she quits her job as Max's behavioral aide. However, she comes back to talk to Kristina about helping Max, where the two women aren't exactly friendly but do part on civil terms.
- Steve Williams (Asher Book) was Haddie's boyfriend, but Haddie broke up with him because she didn't want to sleep with him. His affections for Amber afterward cause tensions between Amber and Haddie (who get in a fight) and other members of the family. His dad has MS, and he confides in Amber for the first time about his father's condition. He reveals to Amber's mother and uncle his love for Amber after she runs away.
- Renee Trussell (Tina Lifford) is Jasmine's mother and Jabbar's (and baby Aida's) grandmother. Jabbar stays with Renee while Jasmine is performing with the dancing troupe. She is very cold and mean towards Crosby and doesn't think he can live up to his promises. Crosby retaliates by telling her that he is not a pushover and that he will be for Jasmine and Jabbar. Renee smiles and congratulates Crosby on his mature behavior. Renee and her son Sekou walk Jasmine down the aisle at her wedding with Crosby. Renee lives with Crosby, Jasmine, and Jabbar briefly when she loses her job, but moves out after a disagreement on how they discipline Jabbar. Renee insists that baby Aida should be baptized, and holds a baptism brunch at her place. She gets along well with Camille, and at the pre-baptism dinner at Zeek and Camille's house, says she always enjoys dinners that Camille holds.
- Gordon Flint (William Baldwin) was Adam's boss until he sold the company. When Sarah became an intern at Adam's company, she and Gordon became romantically involved, which caused friction between Adam and Sarah. Gordon is invited by Sarah to the Braverman Thanksgiving dinner, but that morning, when telling Adam he sold the company, Adam asks him not to come to the dinner. Gordon comes anyway, and at the football game that afternoon, tensions between Adam and Gordon come to a head.
- Mike (Kevin Alejandro), aka "Forklift Mike", drives a forklift at T&S Footwear. Mike recommends a band for Sarah to take Amber and Kelsey to see, at a club where Mike knows the man at the door.
- Alex (Michael B. Jordan) is Haddie's on again, off again boyfriend, whom she met while she volunteering at the food bank he currently manages. He is a recovering alcoholic and three years older than Haddie, so Haddie's parents initially disapprove of the relationship.
- Cory Smith (Anthony Carrigan) is Adam's new boss when Gordon sells the company. His youth and radical approach to business are disconcerting to Adam. One Sunday Adam comes in to work, and Cory is smoking pot with friends and listening to loud music. One day Sarah is turned down for a raise by Cory, who suggests Sarah find work that she wants to do, so Sarah quits her internship. Another weekend Cory offers Adam an "edible" lollipop and explains his idea for the shoe company; Adam thinks he understands, but is unaware that he ingested cannabis until afterwards when Crosby notices it. One day Cory fires Eddie, the design manager (who is replaced by "Spyder", Cory's friend) without Adam's knowledge. Adam (after a night at the hospital because of Amber's accident) gets mad at Cory, and Cory later thinks Adam's not happy there, is hurt that Adam's not in agreement with him, and fires Adam.
- Gilliam T. Blount (Richard Dreyfuss) is a former Broadway producer who served in Vietnam, where Zeek saved his life. He helps Sarah with her play and produces it in season 2.
- Zoe DeHaven (Rosa Salazar) is the "coffee girl" who was carrying the baby that Julia and Joel planned to adopt. However, after the baby was born, she decided to keep him.
- Amy Ellis (Skyler Day) is Drew's girlfriend during parts of seasons 3 and 4, and stays at Drew's dorm room for several weeks when she does not want to return to Tufts in season 5.
- Dr. Joe Prestridge (D. B. Woodside), aka "Dr. Joe", is Jabbar's pediatrician who dates Jasmine in season 3. He asks her and Jabbar to move in with him, but she reconciles with and marries Crosby instead.
- Rachel (Alexandra Daddario) is Adam and Crosby's assistant at their recording studio, The Luncheonette during season 3. She is passionate about music and dresses provocatively; she is also shown to be a gifted pianist. She kissed Adam, but fears for her job after Adam tells Kristina about it. Kristina resolves the situation by telling Rachel never to let it happen again; Rachel agrees.
- Micah Watson (Hayden Byerly) is Max's best friend in seasons 3 and 4, who uses a wheelchair due to spina bifida.
- Bob Little (Jonathan Tucker) is a politician who runs for city council in season 3, and for mayor in season 5. Kristina Braverman works on his city council campaign, and runs against him for mayor. In season 3, Bob has a brief fling with Amber, who had been promoted from Kristina's assistant to Bob Little's assistant. Kristina catches them together and thus loses trust in him. Bob Little loses the city council election. Kristina is invited to run Bob Little's mayoral campaign, but decides instead to run against him. Although he runs a smear campaign, Kristina decides not to resort to such tactics. He wins the mayoral election by 2 points (approximately 900 votes). Late in season 5, Kristina is able to get Mayor Bob Little to lease her a building for Chambers Academy, the school she decides to open.
- Lily (Courtney Ford) is a cellist who records at the Luncheonette in season 3. Crosby, Jabbar, Jasmine, and Dr. Joe attend her performance at the park. Crosby allows Lily to use the extra studio to practice after hours. Lily is Crosby's brief love interest until he and Jasmine reconcile.
- Gwen Chambers (Rose Abdoo) is a cancer patient who befriends and advises Kristina when Kristina is diagnosed with cancer. Gwen suffers a relapse of cancer and dies around the end of season 5. Kristina names the school she starts "Chambers Academy" in her honor.
- Dr. Bedsloe (Kurt Fuller) is the physician who performs Kristina's lumpectomy, recommends chemotherapy, and routinely checks up on her to see if the cancer is progressing or if she is cancer-free.
- Ruby Rizzoli (Courtney Grosbeck) is Hank Rizzoli's daughter, who is 14 in season 5.
- Sandy Rizzoli (Betsy Brandt) is Hank Rizzoli's former wife and the mother of Ruby Rizzoli.
- Oliver Rome (Tyson Ritter) is a musician who works for a fictional label in the show. He has his own band called Ashes of Rome. He is often egotistical and hotheaded.
- Carl Fletcher (Josh Stamberg) is a tenant in the building where Sarah Braverman lives and works as a super in season 5. Carl and Sarah have a brief relationship.
- Meredith Peet (Sonya Walger), known simply as "Peet", is the architect who hires Joel and his construction crew in season 5.
- Ed Brooks (David Denman) is a parent at the school Sydney and Victor Graham attend, who is on the sustainability committee with Julia. Their friendship starts to turn into an emotional affair that starts to get complicated when Ed kisses Julia, causing Joel to leave her.
- Heather Hall (Jurnee Smollett-Bell) is a smart and feisty up-and-coming political campaign adviser whom Kristina hires to be her campaign manager in season 5.
- Chad “Berto” Roberto (Nick Krause) is Drew's college roommate in season 5. Drew often has issues with Berto over boundaries and the door being locked (at one point, prompting an intervention by Ryan and Amber) and because Berto slept with Natalie (while Amy was visiting Drew). When Drew returns to the room after a few weeks’ absence, Berto suggests the Drew voice his issues while chugging beer; Drew and Berto seem to get along afterwards.
- Natalie (Lyndon Smith) is Drew's love interest and dorm-mate at UC Berkeley during seasons 5 and 6.
- Chris Jefferies (Coby Ryan McLaughlin) is Julia's colleague at the law firm where she works during season 6. They dated in law school, and got back in a romantic relationship, until she reconciles with Joel. Before Julia and Joel reconcile, though, Adam recruits Chris for a basketball game during a family picnic where Chris only came to have Julia sign a paper; Joel is mad because she introduced him to the kids.
- Dr. Leland Gordon (Leland Crooke) is the physician who performs heart surgery on Zeek, and sees him when Zeek has a second cardiac episode.
- Dylan Jones (Ally Ioannides) is a newer student at Chambers Academy with ADHD and an abrupt personality, who befriends Max (whom she usually calls "Asperger's"). Max becomes romantically interested in her, but she does not reciprocate the feelings that Max has.
- Aaron Brownstein (Isaac Salzman) is a student at Chambers Academy with ADHD. He is in the culinary arts class, where students are always warning Adam Braverman (who teaches the class) when Aaron has matches or a knife. Max catches Aaron and Dylan in the kitchen kissing, asks Headmaster Braverman (his mom) to expel him, and when she doesn't, he distributes flyers to the students about why Aaron Brownstein should be expelled, leading to a fight between Aaron and Max.
- Edgar (Andy Ames) is a Chambers Academy student in the culinary arts class. During Career Week, Edgar asks Adam Braverman to mentor him on how to be a French chef.
