= Parenthood season 3 =

Parenthood
- Season 3
- DVD cover
- No. of episodes: 18

Release
- Original network: NBC
- Original release: September 13, 2011 – February 28, 2012

Season chronology
- ← Previous; Season 2 Next → Season 4

The third season of the NBC comedy-drama series Parenthood premiered on September 13, 2011, and ended on February 28, 2012. This season consisted of 18 episodes.

== Cast ==
=== Main cast ===
- Peter Krause as Adam Braverman
- Lauren Graham as Sarah Braverman
- Dax Shepard as Crosby Braverman
- Monica Potter as Kristina Braverman
- Erika Christensen as Julia Braverman-Graham
- Sam Jaeger as Joel Graham
- Savannah Paige Rae as Sydney Graham (16 episodes)
- Sarah Ramos as Haddie Braverman (16 episodes)
- Max Burkholder as Max Braverman (15 episodes)
- Joy Bryant as Jasmine Trussell (12 episodes)
- Tyree Brown as Jabbar Trussell (15 episodes)
- Miles Heizer as Drew Holt (13 episodes)
- Mae Whitman as Amber Holt
- Bonnie Bedelia as Camille Braverman (14 episodes)
- Craig T. Nelson as Zeek Braverman (15 episodes)

=== Recurring cast ===
- Jason Ritter as Mark Cyr
- Michael B. Jordan as Alex
- Skyler Day as Amy Ellis
- John Corbett as Seth Holt
- D. B. Woodside as Dr. Joseph Prestridge
- Alexandra Daddario as Rachel
- Rosa Salazar as Zoe DeHaven
- Courtney Ford as Lily
- Tom Maden as Zach Bell
- Amanda Foreman as Suze Lessing
- Tina Lifford as Renee Trussell
- Jonathan Tucker as Bob Little

== Production ==
Parenthood was renewed for a third season by NBC on May 12, 2011. This season of Parenthood was set to only have 16 episodes. However, on September 29, 2011, NBC ordered two more episodes of Parenthood bringing this seasons total to 18 episodes.

== Episodes ==
No. overall	No. in season	Title	Directed by	Written by	Original release date	Prod. code	US viewers (millions)
36	1	"I Don't Want to Do This Without You"	Lawrence Trilling	Jason Katims	September 13, 2011	301	6.29
Following months of unemployment, Adam feels the stress of providing for his family and begins searching for new jobs. He ponders a business venture with Crosby, who suggests that they work together to buy the Luncheonette, a local recording studio. Julia becomes frustrated with the adoption process and discovers that Zoe, the pregnant barista at her law firm, is giving her baby up for adoption. Sarah prepares to celebrate a milestone birthday, and leans on Mark for emotional support. Amber announces to the family that she has decided to move out, although Sarah strongly disapproves of the apartment that Amber is moving into. Haddie gets drunk at a house party and asks Alex to pick her up; Alex punches the host Zach for trying to stop Haddie from leaving and gets arrested for assault and battery charges. After getting bailed out by Julia, Alex secretly reveals that he has a criminal record.
37	2	"Hey, If You're Not Using That Baby..."	Lawrence Trilling	Kerry Ehrin	September 20, 2011	302	5.28
Kristina is concerned over Max's well-being as he attends a mainstream public school. Max struggles to make friends in his class but ends up befriending Jabbar and his friends. The stress of the adoption process causes Julia to express interest in adopting Zoe's baby. Despite Joel's objections, Julia approaches Zoe about adopting her baby; Zoe flatly shuts down the idea. Haddie finds out about Alex's criminal record and confronts him about his past. Sarah and Mark have sex; Sarah initially struggles to define their fling, but ultimately decides to pursue a serious relationship with Mark. Adam is initially reluctant to work with his brother, as he believes Crosby to have poor business acumen. However, after realizing how much the Luncheonette means to Crosby, Adam agrees to become Crosby's business partner.
38	3	"Step Right Up"	Adam Davidson	David Hudgins	September 27, 2011	303	5.53
Crosby and Adam continue working towards their business, although Kristina continues to express concerns over Crosby's involvement. Jasmine and Crosby schedule a visit with Dr. Joe for Jabbar's rash. After their visit, Dr. Joe calls Jasmine for a date; Jasmine accepts the offer but wonders if she now fits in the Braverman family, while Crosby is unsure how he feels about Jasmine dating. Amber revels in her new independence, while Sarah strives to remain a part of her life. Zoe confronts Julia for avoiding her, and reveals that she rejected Julia's offer because she wants a closed adoption. Drew bonds with his neighbor Amy, and receives relationship advice from Zeek. While Alex and Haddie continue to grow distant, Adam visits Zach's parents and gives an impassioned speech about Alex which encourages them to drop the charges. Adam and Kristina discover that they are having a daughter.
39	4	"Clear Skies From Here on Out"	Adam Davidson	Bridget Carpenter	October 4, 2011	304	5.05
Zeek books a role in an erectile dysfunction commercial, which surprises the family but also inspires Camille to think about her achievements and focus on her own interests. Realizing they are at different stages in their lives, Alex decides to break up with Haddie. Alex also visits Kristina and tearfully thanks her and Adam for being parental figures in his life. A picture of Mark kissing Sarah in public begins circulating around the school, to Drew's dismay. Drew and Amy go on their first date, but Drew struggles to break the shell of his social inhibitions. Max seems to be fitting in at school, but Jabbar is uncomfortable with having to sit with Max at lunch every day, leading to a fight between the two cousins. Crosby's inability to handle the situation effectively creates tension between him and Adam, but the two reconcile when the bank approves their loan, solidifying their business partnership.
40	5	"Nora"	Allison Liddi-Brown	Jason Katims	October 11, 2011	305	5.26
At Kristina's insistence, Amber spends her lunch hour with Max, who has received detention for his fight with Jabbar. Amber helps Max come to terms with the fight and create a sincere apology to Jabbar, which Jabbar accepts. A drunken Seth arrives at Zeek's house and confronts Sarah and Mark, leading Zeek to throw him off the property. Sarah later picks up Seth when he gets into a bar fight. Realizing that Zoe does not have a support system, Julia offers to let Zoe stay at her house overnight when she experiences contractions. Touched by Julia's gratitude, Zoe agrees to let Julia and Joel adopt her baby. After finding out that Crosby had not been completely truthful about their business plan, Adam sets up a meeting with a local rapper to try to convince him to sign with the Luncheonette. While Adam is busy at the meeting, Kristina goes into labor; Crosby drives Kristina to the hospital and helps deliver her baby, whom she names Nora.
41	6	"Tales From the Luncheonette"	Allison Liddi-Brown	Kerry Ehrin	October 18, 2011	306	5.03
Kristina exhausts herself by diving back into supermom mode, devoting her time towards taking care of Nora. In the process, Kristina is unable to tend to Haddie, who is seeking advice on her college essay. Adam and Crosby prepare their new music studio, in hopes of impressing their first potential client, Cee Lo Green. Drew takes advice from Amber to move forward in his relationship with Amy. Zeek plants doubts about Julia and Joel's adoption plan with Zoe, shaking Julia's confidence. After tending to Seth after his bar fight, Sarah convinces him to go to rehab. Zeek strongly voices his disapproval when Julia and Joel agree to help Sarah pay for a private rehab facility; Joel stands up to Zeek and tells him to respect their personal decisions. Upon discovering that Sarah is helping assist Seth into rehab, Mark reveals that he feels uneasy about Seth's involvement in her life.
42	7	"Forced Family Fun"	Patrick Norris	Sarah Watson	November 1, 2011	307	5.29
Sensing a disconnect within her family, Kristina tries to plan a family fun night, although no one else is enthusiastic about the idea. The constant bickering between the family pushes Kristina to her breaking point; Haddie, Max and Adam later apologize to Kristina for not prioritizing her needs. Julia begins to express concern for Zoe's diet after seeing Zoe eating sushi at work. Jasmine continues her relationship with Dr. Joe, who begins bonding with Jabbar. Fearing that Dr. Joe will replace him as Jabbar's dad, Crosby confronts Jasmine for violating their agreement about introducing dates to Jabbar. Sarah continues to help support Seth throughout his journey in rehab, much to the discomfort of Mark. Zeek, concerned about Sarah's involvement in Seth's life, enlists Adam to warn Sarah about getting hurt; Sarah maintains that she believes Seth is capable of change.
43	8	"In-Between"	Patrick Norris	Eric Guggenheim	November 8, 2011	308	5.30
Amber offers to let Seth stay at her apartment after he is discharged from rehab and begins to gain a better understanding of Sarah's past experiences with Seth. Sarah is conflicted when Seth initiates a kiss with her, and she later reveals to Camille that she still harbors feelings for Seth. Amber overhears the conversation and confronts Seth about his presence in Sarah's life; Seth ultimately decides to live with his cousin in Tahoe to avoid jeopardizing Sarah's relationship with Mark. Adam and Crosby plan a grand opening for the Luncheonette and hire Rachel, a young receptionist whom Kristina is intimidated by. Drew and Amy decide to take a step forward in their relationship. Crosby is upset when Dr. Joe buys tickets to take Jabbar to his first football game. Dr. Joe decides to give the tickets to Crosby, but asserts that he is pursuing a serious relationship with Jasmine and will continue to be a figure in Jabbar's life.
44	9	"Sore Loser"	Lawrence Trilling	Bridget Carpenter	November 15, 2011	309	5.06
When Drew receives a bad grade on his report card, Sarah blames the issue on his relationship with Amy and forbids him from regularly visiting her, leading Drew to ask Amber for advice on sneaking out. Sarah ultimately reneges on her decision when Mark reveals that Amy is helping Drew come out of his shell. Sydney throws a tantrum during a competitive game of charades; Julia and Joel realize that they may have spoiled Sydney and try to teach her how to lose gracefully. Kristina discovers that Max's new friends are secretly mocking him, and she confronts the bullies about his teasing. Crosby, Adam and Rachel celebrate getting a new client, after which Adam offers to drive Rachel home. Flattered by Adam's attention, Rachel impulsively kisses Adam outside her apartment; Adam quickly rejects her advances, but does not inform Kristina about the incident.
45	10	"Mr. Honesty"	Lawrence Trilling	Monica Henderson Beletsky	November 22, 2011	310	4.57
Ignoring Crosby's advice, Adam confesses to Kristina that Rachel kissed him. Kristina feels uneasy about Rachel's continued employment at the Luncheonette, but Adam cannot bring himself to fire Rachel, creating a rift between him and Kristina. In the process, Kristina comes to the decision to return to work. Amber experiences money troubles and implores Camille for help. Camille agrees to lend Amber the money, but also informs Sarah, who tries to help Amber create a financial plan. Julia and Joel have dinner with Zoe and Troy, the father of Zoe's baby; Troy states that he wants compensation for the adoption, and refuses to sign the adoption papers when Julia and Joel vehemently oppose the idea. Crosby and Jasmine have a discussion with Jabbar about their separation. Crosby and Jasmine later spend the night together drinking wine, which culminates in the two having sex.
46	11	"Missing"	Dylan K. Massin	Sarah Watson	November 29, 2011	311	5.76
Overwhelmed by their work schedules, Adam and Kristina are unable to take Max to the museum. When Haddie refuses to drive him, Max takes the bus alone and becomes distressed; the police later locate Max and bring him home. Haddie lectures Max for worrying the family and Adam apologizes to Haddie for putting too much responsibility on her. Adam and Kristina reconcile, and Kristina lays down the law with Rachel. Sarah and Mark babysit Nora, after which Mark reveals that he can envision having a baby with Sarah in the future. Crosby and Jasmine struggle to deal with their rekindled relationship. Upon realizing how much of a good influence Dr. Joe is to Jabbar, Crosby encourages Jasmine to stay with Dr. Joe. Julia tries to keep her distance from Zoe, who objects to Troy's wish for compensation. After getting into a fight with Troy, a distraught Zoe arrives at Julia and Joel's house; Julia comforts Zoe and invites her inside.
47	12	"Road Trip"	Jessica Yu	David Hudgins	January 3, 2012	312	4.94
Zeek forces the entire family to hit the road for a visit to his mother Blanche, whom he has a strained relationship with. To Zeek's displeasure, Kristina keeps herself, Max and Nora at home to punish Max for calling her a bad name. Drew is quiet for most of the trip after walking in on Sarah and Mark having sex that morning. Julia struggles to get work done while Crosby and the kids are being noisy. Adam struggles to bond with Haddie during the trip. The recliner Zeek gifted his mother, although heavy and secured tightly, gets stolen. Zeek becomes angry with his family and heads off without them the next morning. The remaining family members head home, but Adam encourages them to turn back around after Haddie reveals that she is having fun with Adam. Kristina, Max and Nora meet Zeek and Camille at Blanche's house after Max appears to have learned his lesson. Zeek has an emotional bonding moment with Blanche, in which she proclaims that she loves him.
48	13	"Just Smile"	Michael Weaver	Jamie Duneier	January 10, 2012	313	4.70
Crosby and Adam are interviewed by a reporter about the Luncheonette for a local newspaper piece; Adam relates his job loss and his family, impressing the reporter. When the article is published, Crosby is frustrated to discover that Adam has unexpectedly stolen the spotlight of the article. Elsewhere, Crosby bonds with Lily, a cellist who is recording in the studio. Sarah becomes overwhelmed with thoughts of having a baby and seeks her gynecologist for advice. She finally confronts Mark about the idea, and the two have a serious discussion about having a baby. Amber starts a job as Kristina's assistant for her Bob Little campaign; Bob is impressed by Amber when she offers her critique of the campaign video. Julia and Joel try to resist interfering in Zoe's personal life when Troy begins calling the house. Zoe ultimately breaks up with Troy and convinces him to sign the adoption papers.
49	14	"It Is What It Is"	Michael Weaver	Eric Guggenheim	January 17, 2012	314	4.97
Jasmine struggles with her unresolved feelings about Crosby after seeing him and Lily kiss in the studio, and she invites herself to watch Lily's concert performance with Crosby and Jabbar. While Drew continues to bond with Amy's family, Sarah worries that she is slipping away from her son. Zeek is diagnosed with atrial fibrillation by his doctor. After receiving the news, Zeek buys a trailer to fulfill Camille's wish of travelling the world. Haddie receives early acceptance to Cornell, but Adam and Kristina realize that the cost of college will be an extra struggle for the family's economy; Adam nevertheless promises Haddie that they will figure it out. Amber continues to excel at her job, leading Bob to invite her to his fundraiser. Zoe grows emotional after attending a birthing class with Julia. Julia starts to worry about the chance of Zoe wanting to keep her baby, but Zoe reassures her that she will not change her mind.
50	15	"Politics"	Peter Krause	Sarah Watson	February 7, 2012	315	4.63
While clashing with Adam over business strategy for the Luncheonette, Crosby is blindsided when Jasmine reveals that Dr. Joe asked her to move in with him. After attending an engagement party for Mark’s friend, Sarah begins to feel self-conscious about the age difference between her and Mark, which stirs up another conversation about a baby in their future. Bob promotes Amber to a new job as his assistant, but Amber begins to question her own qualifications when the two end up kissing. Bob reassures Amber that he genuinely hired her because of her professionalism and convinces her to return to work. When Sydney begins to show excitement for her baby brother, Zoe grows uncomfortable and moves out of Julia and Joel's house. Believing that Zoe may have changed her mind, Joel tracks down Zoe and confronts her; Zoe affirms that she will proceed with the adoption, but wants distance from their family.
51	16	"Tough Love"	Lawrence Trilling	Monica Henderson Beletsky	February 14, 2012	316	4.48
Bob invites Amber to join him on a weekend business trip, but Haddie expresses concerns to Kristina that Amber and Bob are dating. Following this revelation, Kristina confronts Amber and Bob in his hotel room and lectures the two for their relationship, which could jeopardize the campaign. Crosby finds out about Zeek's health issues; Zeek instructs him to keep it a secret from the family. Max tries to use his Asperger's as an excuse to get out of gym class. Julia struggles to detach herself from getting too involved in Zoe's life when she tries to arrange a paralegal job interview for her. When Zoe reveals that she does not have a high school diploma, Julia provides her with GED flashcards. Sarah and Mark's plan to have a baby elicits an emotional reaction from Drew, who had hoped that Sarah and Seth would rekindle their relationship after Seth got sober. Afterwards, Sarah calls Seth, who is ninety days sober, and tells him of her plan to have a baby with Mark.
52	17	"Remember Me, I'm the One Who Loves You"	Jason Katims	Kerry Ehrin	February 21, 2012	317	4.91
While meeting with the head of a famous recording studio, Adam and Crosby receive a lucrative offer to sell the Luncheonette. Crosby immediately shuts down the idea, but Adam begins to consider the sale when the offer gets raised. Sarah considers the possibility of moving to New York with Mark after Drew graduates. Amber quits her job at the campaign, but Kristina implores her to return to work. Julia and Joel head to the hospital for the birth of their son, and Zoe refuses to hold the baby after giving birth. Julia later visits the hospital to pick up the baby, but finds Zoe happily bonding with her son; Zoe sees Julia watching and gives her a tearful expression. Realizing that Zoe has changed her mind, Julia privately breaks down in tears. Jasmine and Crosby reconcile their past during a camp out with Jabbar, and Crosby apologizes for his past wrongdoings. The following day, Jasmine professes her love for Crosby and asks him to marry her; Crosby accepts the proposal, and the two embrace in the rain with Jabbar.
53	18	"My Brother's Wedding"	Lawrence Trilling	Jason Katims	February 28, 2012	318	5.16
Crosby and Jasmine end their respective relationships with Lily and Dr. Joe and announce their engagement to the family. As they begin preparing a wedding reception in Zeek and Camille's backyard, Crosby learns that Adam wants to sell the Luncheonette, and he angrily replaces Adam as his best man. Sarah breaks up with Mark, having realized that she does not envision having a baby in the future. Julia and Joel meet with an adoption agency and agree to a "sky baby" adoption. Zoe briefly visits Julia and tearfully thanks her for changing her life. At Crosby and Jasmine's wedding reception, Adam gives a speech in which he reneges on his decision to sell the Luncheonette. Drew and Amy sneak out of the reception to have sex for the first time. Mark arrives to reconcile with Sarah, affirming that he still wants to pursue a relationship with her, and proposes marriage. Julia and Joel receive a visit from their case worker, who introduces them to Victor, a prepubescent child whose mother has been incarcerated. Julia and Joel invite Victor inside their home.

== Ratings ==
=== U.S. Live Ratings ===
#	Episode	Air Date	Rating	18-49 (Rating/Share)	Viewers (m)	Ref
1	"I Don't Want to Do This Without You"	September 13, 2011	TBA	2.2/6	6.29	
2	"Hey, If You're Not Using That Baby..."	September 20, 2011	TBA	2.1/6	5.28	
3	"Step Right Up"	September 27, 2011	TBA	2.2/6	5.53	
4	"Clear Skies From Here on Out"	October 4, 2011	TBA	2.0/5	5.05	
5	"Nora"	October 11, 2011	TBA	2.1/5	5.26	
6	"Tales from the Luncheonette"	October 18, 2011	TBA	2.0/5	5.03	
7	"Forced Family Fun"	November 1, 2011	TBA	2.2/6	5.29	
8	"In Between"	November 8, 2011	TBA	2.0/6	5.30	
9	"Sore Loser"	November 15, 2011	TBA	2.0/5	5.06	
10	"Mr. Honesty"	November 22, 2011	TBA	1.9/5	4.57	
11	"Missing"	November 29, 2011	TBA	2.1/6	5.76	
12	"Road Trip"	January 3, 2012	TBA	1.7/4	4.94	
13	"Just Smile"	January 10, 2012	TBA	1.7/4	4.70	
14	"It Is What It Is"	January 17, 2012	TBA	1.7/5	4.97	
15	"Politics"	February 7, 2012	TBA	1.6/4	4.63	
16	"Tough Love"	February 14, 2012	TBA	1.6/4	4.48	
17	"Remember Me, I'm the One Who Loves You"	February 21, 2012	TBA	1.7/5	4.91	
18	"My Brothers Wedding"	February 28, 2012	TBA	1.9/5	5.16	
