= Parenthood season 6 =

Parenthood
- Season 6
- DVD cover
- No. of episodes: 13

Release
- Original network: NBC
- Original release: September 25, 2014 – January 29, 2015

Season chronology
- ← Previous; Season 5

The sixth and final season of the American television series Parenthood premiered on September 25, 2014, and concluded on January 29, 2015. The season order consists of 13 episodes. As part of the budget cuts made by NBC so that the series would have a sixth season, none of the main cast members appears in every episode. The season five budget was reportedly $3.5 million per episode, but the season six budget was only $3 million per episode.

== Cast ==
=== Main cast ===
- Peter Krause as Adam Braverman (11 episodes)
- Lauren Graham as Sarah Braverman (11 episodes)
- Dax Shepard as Crosby Braverman (11 episodes)
- Monica Potter as Kristina Braverman (11 episodes)
- Erika Christensen as Julia Braverman-Graham (11 episodes)
- Sam Jaeger as Joel Graham (11 episodes)
- Savannah Paige Rae as Sydney Graham (7 episodes)
- Xolo Maridueña as Victor Graham (7 episodes)
- Max Burkholder as Max Braverman (11 episodes)
- Joy Bryant as Jasmine Trussell (11 episodes)
- Tyree Brown as Jabbar Trussell (7 episodes)
- Miles Heizer as Drew Holt (10 episodes)
- Mae Whitman as Amber Holt (11 episodes)
- Bonnie Bedelia as Camille Braverman (11 episodes)
- Craig T. Nelson as Zeek Braverman (11 episodes)

=== Recurring cast ===
- Mia Allan and Ella Allan as Nora Braverman
- Ray Romano as Hank Rizzoli
- Coby Ryan McLaughlin as Chris Jefferies
- Tina Lifford as Renee Trussell
- Lyndon Smith as Natalie
- Courtney Grosbeck as Ruby Rizzoli
- Betsy Brandt as Sandy
- Ally Ioannides as Dylan Jones
- Isaac Salzman as Aaron Brownstein
- Leland Crooke as Dr. Leland Gordon

=== Special guest star ===
- Sarah Ramos as Haddie Braverman (2 episodes)

== Episodes ==
No. overall	No. in season	Title	Directed by	Written by	Original release date	Prod. code	US viewers (millions)
91	1	"Vegas"	Lawrence Trilling	Jason Katims	September 25, 2014	601	4.26
Sarah surprises Zeek with a birthday trip to Las Vegas. While gambling at the casino, Zeek collapses and is rushed to the emergency room. Crosby and Adam travel to Vegas to visit Zeek in the hospital, but discover that he has voluntarily gone back to the casino; Zeek stubbornly dismisses the collapse as a minor incident. Julia is pursuing a relationship with her colleague Chris, whom she used to date in college. Worried about Zeek's collapse, Julia is comforted by Joel, who unexpectedly kisses her. Adam and Kristina prepare to open their charter school, Chambers Academy, although Max is hesitant to attend the school. Ruby and Sandy move back to Berkeley; Sandy admits that they moved because of Ruby's troubling behavior in Minnesota, and reveals that she wants to share joint custody with Hank. Amber feels overwhelmed by the thought of becoming a parent and expresses her feelings to Haddie. Under Haddie's advice, Amber decides to reveal her pregnancy to Sarah.
92	2	"Happy Birthday, Zeek"	Lawrence Trilling	Sarah Watson	October 2, 2014	602	4.34
Sarah initially reacts coldly upon learning of Amber's pregnancy. Sarah later visits Amber to discuss whether Ryan will be involved in raising the baby, and confesses that she wishes Amber had not become pregnant at this stage of her life. Sydney's teacher informs Julia and Joel that Sydney has been bullying a girl named Melody in her class. Joel believes the root of Sydney's behavior is because of their separation, and Julia angrily confronts Joel for giving up on their relationship. Kristina struggles to accommodate the individual needs of her Chambers Academy students when the school's lunch vendor quits. Zeek is informed by his doctor that he needs open-heart surgery, but Zeek rebukes the doctor's suggestion. The Braverman siblings throw a birthday party for Zeek, which turns heated when concerns about Zeek's health are raised. Amber tells Zeek about her pregnancy, after which Zeek tells Camille that he will have the surgery.
93	3	"The Waiting Room"	Patrick Norris	Jessica Goldberg	October 9, 2014	603	4.25
As the Bravermans prepare for Zeek's surgery, Zeek inadvertently reveals Amber's pregnancy to the rest of the family. Drew and Amber drive to Wyoming to tell Ryan about Amber's pregnancy. Ryan is elated by the news and Amber plans to stay in Wyoming with him, but Drew believes that Ryan will not be a stable father figure for the baby and compares Ryan to Seth. Amber discovers that Ryan is still struggling with substance abuse, and ultimately decides that she cannot let Ryan take care of the baby. Julia reveals to Joel that she is dating somebody else. Following a heated phone call with Oliver, Crosby has a minor motorcycle accident. Ruby steals a lipstick while shopping with Sarah, and Hank informs Sandy about the incident. Sandy accuses Hank of "pawning" Ruby on Sarah and forbids Ruby from spending time with her, insisting that Hank should prioritize his own relationship with his daughter. Zeek's surgery ultimately goes smoothly with zero complications.
94	4	"A Potpourri of Freaks"	Peter Krause	Ian Deitchman & Kristin Rusk Robinson	October 16, 2014	604	4.20
At Chambers Academy, Max begins to bond with a female student named Dylan. Kristina disapproves of Dylan's behavior, particularly for giving Max the nickname "Asperger's", while Max reveals to Adam that he has a crush on Dylan. Upon discovering that Oliver is planning to leave the Luncheonette, Adam sends Crosby to confront Oliver at his healing center, only to discover that Oliver has already switched labels. After Sydney gives Melody a halfhearted apology, Melody's parents lambast Julia and Joel for their parenting. Julia and Joel fret over how their separation has affected the kids, and they tell Sydney that they are uncertain if they will reconcile. Hank confronts Sandy to clarify that he is in a committed relationship with Sarah and that she will be a part of Ruby's life. Camille enlists the family's help in getting Zeek to try to walk after his surgery; Kristina finally convinces Zeek to focus on his health by relating her cancer journey.
95	5	"The Scale of Affection is Fluid"	Bethany Rooney	Jesse Zwick	October 23, 2014	605	3.95
At a Braverman family barbecue, Chris shows up to deliver work documents for Julia. In the process, Adam invites Chris to join the barbecue; Joel arrives and sees Chris playing basketball with Sydney and Victor. Joel later visits Julia at work and confronts her for introducing Chris to the kids. Adam encourages Max to ask out Dylan, but Kristina believes that Dylan will not reciprocate Max's feelings and worries that Max will end up heartbroken. Amber goes on a date with a man named Griffin, but he decides against pursuing a relationship after learning that Amber is pregnant. Jasmine revokes Crosby's motorcycle privileges because of his motorcycle accident. Crosby spends the day with Zeek, and the two go to a bar after Zeek's physical therapy appointment; Crosby goes on a drunken rant about parenting, his marriage and his financial troubles at the Luncheonette. Afterwards, Jasmine picks up Crosby and confesses to Zeek that she is worried about Crosby's behavior.
96	6	"Too Big to Fail"	Jessica Yu	Ian Deitchman & Kristin Rusk Robinson	October 30, 2014	606	3.89
Three months later, Amber begins to feel financial pressure and asks for a raise, even though the Luncheonette is struggling in business. Drew begins to consider his own future and seeks Adam for advice over declaring his major. Dylan continues to spend time at the Braverman house and takes a particular liking to Kristina. Upon learning that Dylan has a distant relationship with her parents, Kristina worries that Dylan is only spending time with Max because of his family. While staying at Hank and Sarah's apartment, Amber helps Ruby when Ruby gets drunk at a party. Amber also encourages Ruby to recognize Hank's efforts to bond with her, recounting her own strained relationship with Seth. Jabbar wants to go to Harry Potter World for his birthday; Crosby is unable to afford it and is forced to admit the Luncheonette's financial troubles to Jasmine.
97	7	"These Are the Times We Live In"	Eric Galileo Tignini	Sarah Watson	November 6, 2014	607	3.96
While Adam and Kristina are away, Amber offers to help babysit Max and Nora, but struggles to handle Max's emotions when they are forced to miss an outing that he was looking forward to. Sarah helps comfort Amber when she begins to doubt her parenting abilities. Zeek forces Drew to drive him around the city so they can bond together. Sarah and Sandy have a tense conversation over their differences in parenting styles; Hank walks out to avoid confrontation, to Sarah's dismay. Forced to confront his struggles with communication, Hank tells Sandy about his Asperger's. During a meeting with the divorce lawyer, Julia states that they should sell the house; Joel refuses, due to his emotional attachment to the house. As they prepare to finalize their divorce, Joel visits Zeek to say goodbye, but Zeek encourages him to fight for his marriage. Joel later confronts Julia, apologizing for giving up on their relationship, and proclaims that he wants her back.
98	8	"Aaron Brownstein Must Be Stopped"	Lawrence Trilling	Jessica Goldberg	November 13, 2014	608	3.61
Max wants to ask Dylan for a date, but has difficulty comprehending the fact that Dylan does not reciprocate his feelings. Max later professes his feelings for Dylan with a collage; Dylan grows distressed by Max's attention and loudly proclaims that she will never love him in front of the school. Kristina comforts a distraught Max, stating that she is proud of him for conveying his emotions. Amber believes she is in labor, but learns at the hospital that she has experienced Braxton-Hicks contractions. Despite Sandy's objections, Hank agrees to let Ruby stay home alone; Ruby abuses Hank's trust and throws a party, which Hank breaks up. As business at the Luncheonette continues to decline, Crosby feels inadequate when Jasmine decides to return to corporate work at Renee's office. Crosby expresses regret for forcing Jasmine to take a job that she is not passionate about, but she affirms that they will both eventually get their "time to shine" in the future.
99	9	"Lean In"	Lawrence Trilling	Jesse Zwick	November 20, 2014	609	3.99
Kristina is torn between her role as headmistress and as a parent when Dylan’s parents threaten to pull her from Chambers due to Kristina's failure to address Max's pestering behavior. Adam and Kristina teach Max a lesson about rejection and respecting Dylan's boundaries, after which Max apologizes to Dylan, whose parents agree to let her stay at Chambers. Sarah reunites with Mark, who reveals that he is becoming a father. Hank feels self-conscious and asks Sarah if she is happy in their relationship; Sarah reassures Hank that she is truly happy with him. Joel apologizes to Julia for his wrongdoings in their relationship, while Chris breaks up with Julia, believing she is having second thoughts about the divorce. Julia and Joel later have sex. Zeek plans a trip to France, and a concerned Drew informs Camille, who forbids the trip. Zeek reveals that he had intended for the trip to be a romantic getaway with Camille; Camille agrees to go once he is cleared for travelling. Later that night, Zeek experiences a heart attack and weakly instructs Camille to call an ambulance.
100	10	"How Did We Get Here?"	Michael Weaver	Jason Katims	January 8, 2015	610	4.63
The Braverman family immediately rush to visit Zeek, who has a second heart attack after initially being stabilized. Upon returning to consciousness, Zeek discovers that his heart is failing, and is presented with two options by the doctor: to undergo a risky second surgery, or to decline the surgery, which could increase the chance of a stroke or aneurysm. Adam receives a call that the Luncheonette has been robbed. After speaking with their insurance company, Adam expresses interest in dissolving the business and paying off their debts with the payout. Crosby initially agrees, but later reneges on his decision when Jasmine encourages him to pursue his dream. Hank tries to comfort Drew, who feels guilty for telling Camille about Zeek's plans for France; Drew thanks Hank for being a good partner to Sarah. Outside the hospital, Hank impulsively decides to propose to Sarah, who asks if they can discuss it at a better time. Amber throws a makeshift baby shower in the hospital cafeteria; Camille advises Amber to "cherish every minute" because life is short.
101	11	"Let's Go Home"	Allison Liddi-Brown	Sarah Watson	January 15, 2015	611	4.12
Sarah confronts Hank about his spontaneous proposal, and he insists that the proposal was genuine. Max develops Zeek's old rolls of film with Hank, and discovers that they are old childhood photos of the Bravermans. While looking over the childhood photos, Sarah seeks guidance from Camille, who asks if she loves Hank and if he makes her happy. Sarah says yes to both questions, and she later visits Hank and accepts his proposal. Crosby is depressed when Adam decides that they should sell the Luncheonette. Jasmine secretly visits Adam and asks him to reconsider, after which Adam tells Crosby that he has changed his mind. Joel and Julia have a serious discussion about the future of their relationship; Julia later invites Joel to join her and the kids at the ice rink, much to the excitement of Sydney and Victor. Zeek and Camille revisit their old house to search for Zeek's favorite baseball, which he wants to give to his first great-grandchild; they gain a sense of closure and peace as they watch the new family that has moved in playing in the front yard.
102	12	"We Made it Through the Night"	Jason Katims	Jason Katims	January 22, 2015	612	4.40
While going on a hike with Camille, Zeek tells her that he does not want to undergo the surgery and instead prefers to enjoy the time he has left; Camille accepts his decision. Adam and Kristina reassure Max about his future after he reads a statistic that people with autism have a high unemployment rate. As Julia and Joel begin to slowly rekindle their relationship, Joel expresses his concerns over Julia working with Chris, forcing the two to work out their issues regarding their respective jobs and wrongdoings. Crosby and Adam prepare to reopen the Luncheonette, but Crosby fights with Adam upon discovering that Jasmine secretly talked to Adam; the two ultimately decide not to renew their partnership, shuttering the Luncheonette. Sarah tells Zeek that she and Hank are getting married, and Hank agrees to move the wedding date up so Zeek is able to walk Sarah down the aisle. Amber gives birth at the hospital, and she names her baby boy Zeek.
103	13	"May God Bless and Keep You Always"	Lawrence Trilling	Jason Katims	January 29, 2015	613	5.46
The Braverman family attends Sarah and Hank's wedding: Hank asks Drew to be his best man, Max asks a girl to dance, and Haddie returns for the wedding. Amber adapts to her new life as a mother and agrees to move in with Zeek and Camille. Crosby reconciles with Adam and reopens the Luncheonette with Amber as his new partner. Julia and Joel receive a call from their social worker, who reveals that Victor's mother has given birth to another baby and wants Julia and Joel to adopt her; Julia and Joel agree. Kristina reveals that a non-profit has agreed to build more Chamber Academies, and Adam takes Kristina's role as headmaster. Camille discovers that Zeek has died in his sleep; sometime later, the Bravermans are seen spreading Zeek's ashes on a baseball field, exactly as Zeek had requested, and a baseball game between the family ensues to celebrate Zeek's life. A montage featuring the fates of the characters extending an indeterminate amount of time into the future begins: Camille visits the Café in France where Zeek had planned to take her, Jasmine is visibly pregnant, Julia and Joel are seen with four children, Amber is married with a young daughter, Ryan visits his son, and Max graduates from Chambers Academy. The series finale concludes with the entire Braverman family exiting the baseball field together.

== Ratings ==
No.	Title	Air date	Ratings/share (18–49)	Viewers (millions)	DVR 18–49	DVR viewers (millions)	Total 18–49	Total viewers (millions)
Season 6 (2014–15)
1	"Vegas"	September 25, 2014	1.4/4	4.26	1.1	2.83	2.5	7.09
2	"Happy Birthday, Zeek"	October 2, 2014	1.3/4	4.34	1.1	2.70	2.4	7.04
3	"The Waiting Room"	October 9, 2014	1.3/4	4.25	1.0	2.31	2.3	6.56
4	"A Potpourri of Freaks"	October 16, 2014	1.3/4	4.20	1.0	2.49	2.3	6.69
5	"The Scale of Affection is Fluid"	October 23, 2014	1.2/4	3.95	0.9	2.33	2.1	6.28
6	"Too Big to Fail"	October 30, 2014	1.1/4	3.89	1.1	2.45	2.2	6.34
7	"These Are the Times We Live In"	November 6, 2014	1.3/5	3.96	0.9	2.36	2.2	6.32
8	"Aaron Brownstein Must Be Stopped"	November 13, 2014	1.0/3	3.61	1.0	N/A	2.0	N/A
9	"Lean In"	November 20, 2014	1.3/4	3.99	0.9	N/A	2.2	N/A
10	"How Did We Get Here?"	January 8, 2015	1.4/4	4.63	1.0	2.31	2.4	6.94
11	"Lets Go Home"	January 15, 2015	1.2/4	4.12	1.0	2.37	2.2	6.49
12	"We Made it Through the Night"	January 22, 2015	1.3/4	4.40	N/A	2.61	N/A	7.01
13	"May God Bless and Keep You Always"	January 29, 2015	1.7/5	5.46	1.1	2.74	2.8	8.20
