= Parenthood season 5 =

Parenthood
- Season 5
- DVD cover
- No. of episodes: 22

Release
- Original network: NBC
- Original release: September 26, 2013 – April 17, 2014

Season chronology
- ← Previous; Season 4 Next → Season 6

The fifth season of the American television series Parenthood premiered on September 26, 2013 and concluded on April 17, 2014. It consisted of 22 episodes.

== Cast ==
=== Main cast ===
- Peter Krause as Adam Braverman
- Lauren Graham as Sarah Braverman
- Dax Shepard as Crosby Braverman
- Monica Potter as Kristina Braverman
- Erika Christensen as Julia Braverman-Graham
- Sam Jaeger as Joel Graham (21 episodes)
- Savannah Paige Rae as Sydney Graham (19 episodes)
- Xolo Maridueña as Victor Graham (19 episodes)
- Max Burkholder as Max Braverman (21 episodes)
- Joy Bryant as Jasmine Trussell (21 episodes)
- Tyree Brown as Jabbar Trussell (19 episodes)
- Miles Heizer as Drew Holt (18 episodes)
- Mae Whitman as Amber Holt (20 episodes)
- Bonnie Bedelia as Camille Braverman (17 episodes)
- Craig T. Nelson as Zeek Braverman (21 episodes)

=== Recurring cast ===
- Mia Allan and Ella Allan as Nora Braverman
- Ray Romano as Hank Rizzoli
- Tyson Ritter as Oliver Rome
- Matt Lauria as Ryan York
- David Denman as Ed Brooks
- Jurnee Smollett-Bell as Heather Hall
- Sonya Walger as Meredith Peet
- Kelly Wolf as Mrs. McKindall
- Tina Lifford as Renee Trussell
- Lyndon Smith as Natalie
- Courtney Grosbeck as Ruby Rizzoli
- Nick Krause as Chad "Berto" Roberto
- Jonathan Tucker as Bob Little
- Skyler Day as Amy Ellis
- Tom Amandes as Dr. Pelikan
- Matthew Atkinson as Zach
- Josh Stamberg as Carl Fletcher
- Alexandra Barreto as Karen Fillman
- Zachary Knighton as Evan Knight
- Rose Abdoo as Gwen Chambers
- David L. King as Principal Radford

=== Special guest stars ===
- Sarah Ramos as Haddie Braverman
- David Walton as Will Freeman (of About a Boy) in episode 13 "Jump Ball"

== Episodes ==
No. overall	No. in season	Title	Directed by	Written by	Original release date	Prod. code	US viewers (millions)
69	1	"It Has to Be Now"	Lawrence Trilling	Jason Katims	September 26, 2013	501	5.06
A cancer-free Kristina looks to seize the moment, but is hesitant to accept a job running Bob Little's mayoral campaign. At Gwen's encouragement, Kristina instead decides to run against Bob. Sarah works as a superintendent of an apartment building and bonds with Carl, another tenant. Crosby and Jasmine struggle to adjust to parental life after Jasmine gives birth to their daughter Aida. Joel begins working for a female architect named Peet, while Julia fails to land a job when the employer contacts her previous firm as a reference. Hank has moved back to Berkeley and discovers Max's aptitude for photography when Max visits the photography studio. Adam confronts Hank to ensure that he is not befriending Max to get back together with Sarah. Amber anticipates reuniting with Ryan, who has been redeployed to Kandahar. Ryan comes home and spontaneously decides to propose to Amber.
70	2	"All Aboard Who's Coming Aboard"	Lawrence Trilling	David Hudgins	October 3, 2013	502	4.17
Amber and Ryan announce the news of their engagement to the family. Sarah is apprehensive about the news and turns to Hank, who advises Sarah to express her concerns to Amber. Adam objects to Hank's advice, recounting the fallout of Zeek's reaction to Sarah and Seth's engagement. Jasmine and Crosby have their hands full between raising the baby and Jabbar. Julia is forced to join the school's sustainability committee and bonds with Ed, another parent in the group. Kristina hires a competitive campaign manager, Heather, who believes that Adam is unenthusiastic of the mayoral campaign. Kristina confronts Adam, who reveals that he is worried that the potential stress of the campaign could be harmful to Kristina's health. While trying to install a home security system, Camille brings up the idea of selling the family home, but Zeek is dismissive of the idea.
71	3	"Nipple Confusion"	Patrick Norris	Sarah Watson	October 10, 2013	503	3.77
Julia and Joel have a meeting with Victor's teacher, who recommends that Victor be held back a grade. Julia and Joel have an intense argument about the issue; Julia believes holding Victor back would benefit him in the long-run, but Joel strongly disagrees, as the move will affect Victor's self-confidence. Adam continues to struggle with the amount of money they are spending on Kristina's campaign, while Sarah tries to convince Kristina to hire her as a photographer for the campaign. Zeek is still reluctant to sell the house, but Camille reveals that she has bigger goals and aspirations for the future. Ryan and Amber try to help Drew confront his roommate Berto, who keeps locking him out of his dorm. As Crosby and Jasmine continue to struggle with parenthood, Crosby is finally able to bond with his daughter when he successfully gets Aida to take a bottle.
72	4	"In Dreams Begin Responsibilities"	Patrick Norris	Gina Fattore	October 17, 2013	504	4.02
Adam is uncomfortable when Heather suggests that he ask his former clients at the Luncheonette for a donation towards Kristina's campaign, while Kristina struggles over whether to accept a donation from a developer whom she dislikes. At the Luncheonette, Crosby tries to deal with Oliver, the demanding lead singer of the band Ashes of Rome. Adam confronts Crosby with a new business plan: to start their own label. Drew wants to get closer to Natalie, a girl on his floor, and asks Adam for advice. After discovering from Julia that Victor is struggling in school, Zeek tries to help Victor with his reading. As Amber and Ryan prepare for their wedding, Sarah is perturbed when Ryan reveals that he is not inviting any of his family. Amber and Sarah get into a fight when Sarah expresses her reservations about both Ryan and the engagement, but Amber asserts that she and Ryan are moving forward with the wedding.
73	5	"Let's Be Mad Together"	Dylan K. Massin	Jessica Goldberg	October 24, 2013	505	3.95
Adam gains Crosby's support in turning the Luncheonette into a record label as they try to sign on Ashes of Rome. As Zeek continues to act dismissive towards Camille's wish to sell the house, Camille confesses to Julia that she feels shut out in their relationship; Julia later pushes Zeek to listen to Camille. Max is demoted as yearbook photographer at school after taking an unwanted photograph of a girl crying; Kristina tries to explain to Max why taking the photo was inappropriate, while Hank praises Max's photography skills. Julia and Joel argue after Joel spends the night getting drunk with Peet; Julia believes that Peet is taking advantage of him. After discovering that Amber and Sarah had a fight over the wedding, Ryan confronts Sarah directly and gives her a heartfelt speech, in which he states that he will be a worthy husband to Amber.
74	6	"The M Word"	James Ponsoldt	Julia Brownell	October 31, 2013	506	3.67
While preparing for the mayoral candidate debate, Kristina objects to Heather's suggestion that she talk about Max's Asperger's. During the debate, Kristina talks about Max when an audience member raises concerns about special needs resources in the public school system; Kristina's speech moves the audience and she ends up winning the debate. Jasmine wants to trade Crosby's current car for a family minivan, to Crosby's dismay. Amber and Ryan want to elope, but Drew advises Amber not to proceed without Sarah's approval. Realizing she needs to be present in her daughter's life, Sarah apologizes to Amber. Joel thanks Julia for her help with the kids, while Julia begins to feel guilty over her close friendship with Ed. Zeek agrees to look at condos with Camille, who realizes that Zeek will never give in to the idea. Camille later reveals to Zeek that she plans to join her art class for a month-long trip to Italy.
75	7	"Speaking of Baggage"	Millicent Shelton	Ian Deitchman & Kristin Rusk Robinson	November 7, 2013	507	3.88
The Luncheonette, per Amber's suggestion, holds a live event for Ashes of Rome to record a song. During a Braverman dinner, Camille reveals her trip to Italy, and the siblings are put off by the fact that Zeek is not joining her. Julia defends Camille for revelling in her independence, while Adam tries to convince Zeek to join Camille on her trip. Drew and Natalie pursue a casual sexual relationship. Julia continues to open up emotionally to Ed as she struggles to deal with Joel's absence at home. Max and Hank have a discussion about Hank and Sarah's relationship after Max finds old photographs of Sarah at the studio; Sarah later confronts Hank for talking about their past relationship with Max. Amber is stressed over wedding preparations and seeks advice from Kristina, who recounts Adam's proposal. Ryan later properly proposes to Amber with an expensive engagement ring.
76	8	"The Ring"	Lawrence Trilling	Justin W. Lo	November 14, 2013	508	3.77
The family watches out for Zeek, who embraces the single life without Camille. As Kristina's poll numbers rise, Bob's campaign brings up the incident of Adam punching a man at the grocery store, attracting unwanted media attention on Adam. Kristina receives Amber's approval to bring up Bob and Amber's relationship to the press, but she ultimately decides against using personal attacks in her campaign. Jabbar begins taking ballet lessons with Jasmine, and Crosby worries that he and Jabbar do not share the same interests. Sarah continues to bond with Carl and decides to attend his party. Amber wants Ryan to give back the engagement ring because of the cost. Julia and Joel get into an intense argument when Victor's school decides to hold him back, and Joel harshly criticizes Julia for her decisions. Julia and Joel later tell Victor about holding him back a grade; Victor breaks down over the prospect.
77	9	"Election Day"	Lawrence Trilling	Jason Katims	November 21, 2013	509	3.65
Election day stirs up emotions amongst the family: Kristina and Adam try to keep hopes high, Jasmine lectures Crosby for being unregistered to vote, and Gwen arrives to support Kristina. Although the poll numbers are close, Kristina ultimately concedes the election to Bob, although she remains thankful for the experience. Hank turns to Sarah for advice when Max expresses interest in dating Ruby. After being held back a grade, Victor acts out at home. Frustrated that Joel is not answering her calls, Julia confronts Joel and Peet at their office. At Kristina's campaign party, Joel lambasts Julia for confronting him at work and being unsupportive of his career. Crosby asks Amber to sing background vocals for Ashes of Rome. Feeling that Amber is starting to ignore him, Ryan confronts Amber while she is partying at a bar with the band. In the process, Ryan angrily beats up Oliver, resulting in Ryan's arrest.
78	10	"All That's Left is the Hugging"	Jessica Yu	Sarah Watson	December 12, 2013	510	3.93
Kristina tries to regroup herself following her election loss, and she and Adam throw eggs at a Bob Little billboard. Sarah and Carl have sex during a power outage in the apartment, after which Sarah proclaims she is not interested in pursuing a serious relationship. Julia and Joel try to resolve their differences, while Julia discovers from Sydney that Ed and his wife are separating. Julia visits Ed to cut contact with him; Ed instead confides to Julia about his failed marriage, and then unexpectedly kisses her. In the aftermath of his arrest, Ryan confides to Zeek about his struggles to adjust to civilian life. Ryan later reveals to Amber that he has re-enlisted into the Army, effectively ending their engagement. Drew asks Crosby for advice about Natalie, who decides to end their friends with benefits relationship when Drew tries to set guidelines. Drew later gets a surprise visit from Amy.
79	11	"Promises"	Michael Weaver	David Hudgins	January 2, 2014	511	3.96
After Max has a meltdown in Hank's studio, Adam gives Hank a book about Asperger's to gain a better understanding of Max's behavior. Hank strongly relates to the contents of the book and begins to consider that he may have Asperger's. Drew forgives Amy for shutting him out after her abortion and they rekindle their relationship, making Natalie jealous. Sarah discovers that Carl is a prestigious doctor when he invites her to attend a charity event. Zeek makes a new friend at a diner, while Camille decides to extend her trip in Italy. Julia confides to Adam about her predicament with Ed; Adam advises Julia to focus on her marriage. At the school's silent auction, Julia is drunkenly confronted by Ed, forcing Joel to step in. Suspecting that Julia is having an affair, Joel directly confronts Julia about her relationship with Ed. Julia tells him that nothing is going on, but Joel does not believe her.
80	12	"Stay a Little Longer"	Michael Weaver	Julia Brownell	January 9, 2014	512	4.26
As Ryan prepares for his deployment, Zeek pushes Amber to visit Ryan before he leaves. Amber confronts Ryan for his decision to re-enlist, and the two share an emotional goodbye. With Carl's help, Sarah gets an interview for a surfing photoshoot, but discovers that she is competing against Hank for the job. Sarah ends up landing the job, to Hank's dismay. Adam and Kristina try to help Max repair his friendship with Micah. After fighting with his band, Oliver temporarily moves in with Jasmine and Crosby. Jasmine convinces Oliver to continue recording the album by relating her own childhood dreams and aspirations; Oliver moves out and writes a song about Jasmine as a form of gratitude. Julia confesses to Joel about her kiss with Ed; Joel feels betrayed by her emotional relationship with Ed and storms out. Julia later suggests they attend marriage counselling, but Joel refuses, believing their problems to be irreparable.
81	13	"Jump Ball"	Ken Whittingham	Jessica Goldberg	January 16, 2014	513	3.98
Suspecting that he may have Asperger's, Hank meets with Dr. Pelikan to discuss his predicament. When Hank asks if he does have Asperger's, Dr. Pelikan states that it is a "jump ball", because the spectrum has a wide diagnostic criteria. Amy continues to stay at Drew's dorm and confesses that she does not want to return to school. Camille returns home to find an ecstatic Zeek, but he is dismayed to learn that Camille wants to attend another trip in France with her art class. Joel continues to spend more time at work, while Julia seeks advice from Sarah. Joel later tells Julia that he intends to move out. Depressed over Ryan's deployment, Amber leaves town to visit the bar that Seth works at. After getting into a fight with a patron, Amber drunkenly vents her frustrations at Seth, claiming that she is just like him. The next morning, Amber apologizes to Seth; he reassures her that she is not like him, because if she were, she would have left without saying goodbye.
82	14	"You've Got Mold"	Ken Whittingham	Gina Fattore	January 23, 2014	514	4.26
Adam and Kristina discover that Max keeps getting sent to the library for class. Unhappy with the school's accommodation of special needs students, Kristina tells Adam that they should start their own school. Sarah partners with Hank to collaborate on the surfing photoshoot, but tensions arise when Hank accuses Sarah of landing the job by sleeping with Carl. Crosby and Jasmine have to vacate the house when mold is found; Crosby reluctantly decides to move his family in with Zeek and Camille. Julia and Joel decide to tell Sydney and Victor about Joel moving out, after which Julia confides to her parents about her marital troubles. Enlightened by her trip to Italy, Camille begins taking an online art class. Zeek expresses his worries to Camille that he has been holding back her happiness throughout their marriage, and he agrees to sell the house.
83	15	"Just Like at Home"	Allison Liddi-Brown	Ian Deitchman & Kristin Rusk Robinson	February 27, 2014	515	3.59
While staying with Zeek and Camille, Crosby receives a visit from a real estate agent and discovers that they are planning to sell the house. Crosby tries to convince Zeek against the idea, but Zeek tells him that he is prioritizing Camille's happiness. Adam and Kristina spend the weekend at a spa. Drew struggles with his living arrangement with Amy, who has begun accompanying him to his classes. After seeking advice from Amber, Drew convinces Amy to move out and talk to her parents about her depression. Carl confesses to Sarah that he has feelings for her. Hank continues to consult with Dr. Pelikan, and Dr. Pelikan's advice about communication helps Hank reconcile with Sarah. Sydney and Victor spend the weekend at Joel's apartment but struggle to adjust to the new family dynamic. Sarah, Crosby and Adam spend the night at Julia's house to comfort her about Joel.
84	16	"The Enchanting Mr. Knight"	Allison Liddi-Brown	Julia Brownell	March 6, 2014	516	3.80
Kristina decides she wants to open a charter school for kids like Max, and she asks Max's teacher Mr. Evan Knight for advice over whether her goals are realistic. Following a medical checkup, Kristina discovers that she is completely cancer-free. Crosby confronts Camille for convincing Zeek to sell the house, calling her decision selfish. Amber encourages Drew to move on from Amy by going to a frat party, while Natalie contemplates her relationship with Drew. Sarah considers an offer from Carl to go to Africa, but ultimately rejects the offer when Hank tells her to focus on her career instead of her relationships. Julia struggles to stick with the split parenting schedule when Sydney wants to stay with her instead of staying at Joel's as planned. Julia apologizes to Ed for blaming him for her and Joel's separation, acknowledging that she too played a role in the dissolution of her marriage.
85	17	"Limbo"	Lawrence Trilling	Jessica Goldberg	March 13, 2014	517	3.87
At Renee's insistence, Jasmine and Crosby reluctantly decide to baptize Aida. Crosby initially selects Julia and Joel to be Aida's godparents, but Joel agrees to step down due to his separation with Julia. Crosby then asks Adam to be Aida's godfather, but Adam is offended upon learning that he was not Crosby's first choice. Julia is hurt to find out that Joel is not attending Aida's baptism. Sarah forces Max to leave the studio when he disrupts Sarah and Hank's workflow. Adam and Kristina confront Sarah for her treatment of Max, but Sarah insists they need to set limits with him. Drew gets high with Amber after discovering that Natalie had sex with Berto. Camille arranges a family dinner the night before Aida's baptism, but tensions among the Braverman siblings lead to a fight at the dinner table. After the dinner, Zeek confronts Joel for failing to attend and gives him a pep talk. Encouraged by Zeek, Joel ultimately decides to attend the baptism, pleasing Julia.
86	18	"The Offer"	Lawrence Trilling	Sarah Watson	March 20, 2014	518	4.22
Max goes on a field trip with his classmates, but Adam and Kristina are forced to pick him up when a traumatized Max refuses to leave the hotel lobby. While driving back, Max breaks down and reveals the severe bullying he faced during the trip, including a classmate who urinated in his canteen; Adam and Kristina are enraged over the news. Old feelings of abandonment resurface for Victor when Joel forgets to pick him up from baseball practice. To make Victor more comfortable, Joel buys him a cell phone, creating a disagreement with Julia. Sydney blames Victor for Julia and Joel's separation. Amber encourages Drew to take his life back when he stops attending the classes that Natalie's in; Natalie confronts Drew for ignoring her. Zeek and Camille get a good offer on the house. Sarah nervously anticipates a response from the client on her final project, and she seeks emotional support from Hank. After a meeting with the client, Sarah happily embraces Hank.
87	19	"Fraud Alert"	Bethany Rooney	Jason Katims	March 27, 2014	519	4.40
Following the incident at the field trip, Max refuses to return to school. Adam and Kristina are dissatisfied with the school's handling of Max's bullying and meet with school administration; the principal dismisses the field trip incident as an accusation, and the dean suggests it would be beneficial for Max to sit out the remainder of the school year. Crosby and Zeek go on a road trip to get a car part from a sketchy auto salvager, during which Zeek admits that he is reluctant to sell the house. Amber and Drew try to help Sydney and Victor deal with Julia and Joel's separation, while Joel refuses to reconcile his relationship with Julia. Julia later decides to meet up with Ed. Sarah reunites with Mark and the two have dinner, during which Mark reveals that he has gotten engaged. Hank is perturbed by Sarah and Mark's reunion and later reveals to Dr. Pelikan that he has feelings for Sarah.
88	20	"Cold Feet"	Michael Weaver	David Hudgins	April 3, 2014	520	3.73
Julia and Evan help Kristina and Adam with their plans for the charter school; Julia convinces Evan to become the school's headmaster. Following a meeting with the school board, Adam and Kristina's charter school plans are approved. Camille begins to get cold feet about selling the house, but changes her mind when Zeek gives her a surprise tour of a small Victorian house. Drew returns to campus and resolves his issues with Berto by drunkenly confronting him for sleeping with Natalie. Under Dr. Pelikan's advice, Hank apologizes to Sarah for his abrupt move to Minnesota; Hank also opens up about his tendency to avoid intimacy, and confesses that he enjoys Sarah's company. Julia and Ed go out on a date, but Julia is hesitant about pursuing a new relationship and walks out. Crosby and Adam throw a party at the Luncheonette to celebrate Ashes of Rome's debut album. Julia and Evan bond at the party and later have sex.
89	21	"I'm Still Here"	Scott Schaeffer	Ian Deitchman & Kristin Rusk Robinson	April 10, 2014	521	3.66
The development for the charter school continues as Kristina meets with Bob Little, who agrees to look into leasing her a potential space for the school. Kristina visits Gwen, who has taken a turn for the worse in her battle with cancer. The following day, Kristina experiences survivor's guilt when Gwen passes away, and she decides to memorialize Gwen by naming the charter school after her. Drew and Natalie work out their relationship difficulties and reconcile. Julia confesses to Sarah that she is still in love with Joel, and later cuts things off with Evan. Crosby catches Joel up on recent events while Joel does renovations at Crosby and Jasmine's house; Joel later visits Julia, and the two have a brief amicable conversation. Ryan is involved in a car accident; Hank helps a distraught Amber drive to San Diego and agrees to wait with Amber in the hospital while Ryan is in surgery. The following day, Sarah and Amber visit Ryan after he gets out of surgery.
90	22	"The Pontiac"	Lawrence Trilling	Jason Katims	April 17, 2014	522	3.99
The Bravermans help Zeek and Camille, who have officially sold the family home. While helping move their parents' items from the house, Adam and Crosby remember their childhood and start acting like kids. Zeek gifts Drew his Pontiac so he can visit Natalie while she is in Portland for the summer. Haddie comes home for the summer with her friend Lauren, but does not reveal to her parents that she and Lauren are dating. Max walks in on Haddie and Lauren kissing and mentions it to Kristina, after which both Adam and Kristina show Haddie their support for the relationship. Victor wins an essay contest, and Julia and Joel help Victor vanquish his fears when he is expected to read the essay in front of the school. While driving back from the hospital, Hank asks Sarah if she wants to give their relationship a second chance. Sarah is initially conflicted, but later kisses Hank at the studio. Ryan reluctantly decides to live with his mother in Wyoming because he has no other options, and he and Amber have sex in his hospital room before she departs. Amber is later seen buying a pregnancy test.

== Ratings ==
=== U.S. Live Ratings ===
No.	Episode	Air Date	Rating	18-49 (Rating/Share)	Viewers (m)	Ref
1	"It Has to be Now"	September 26, 2013		1.6/5	5.06	
2	"All Aboard Who's Coming Aboard"	October 3, 2013		1.5/4	4.17	
3	"Nipple Confusion"	October 10, 2013		1.2/3	3.77	
4	"In Dreams Begin Responsibility"	October 17, 2013		1.3/4	4.02	
5	"Let's Be Mad Together"	October 24, 2013		1.3/4	3.95	
6	"The M Word"	October 31, 2013		1.2/4	3.67	
7	"Speaking of Baggage"	November 7, 2013		1.3/4	3.88	
8	"The Ring"	November 14, 2013		1.2/4	3.77	
9	"Election Day"	November 21, 2013		1.2/3	3.65	
10	"All That's Left is the Hugging"	December 12, 2013		1.2/4	3.93	
11	"Promises"	January 2, 2014		1.3/3	3.96	
12	"Stay a Little Longer"	January 9, 2014		1.3/4	4.26	
13	"Jump Ball"	January 16, 2014		1.2/4	3.98	
14	"You've Got Mold"	January 23, 2014		1.3/4	4.26	
15	"Just Like at Home"	February 27, 2014		1.1/3	3.59	
16	"The Enchanting Mr. Knight"	March 6, 2014		1.2/4	3.80	
17	"Limbo"	March 13, 2014		1.2/4	3.87	
18	"The Offer"	March 20, 2014		1.3/4	4.220	
19	"Fraud Alert"	March 27, 2014		1.4/4	4.400	
20	"Cold Feet"	April 3, 2014		1.2/4	3.760	
21	"I'm Still Here"	April 10, 2014		1.1/4	3.660	
22	"The Pontiac"	April 17, 2014		1.3/4	3.990	
