= Parenthood season 4 =

Parenthood
- Season 4
- DVD cover
- No. of episodes: 15

Release
- Original network: NBC
- Original release: September 11, 2012 – January 22, 2013

Season chronology
- ← Previous; Season 3 Next → Season 5

The fourth season of the NBC comedy-drama series Parenthood premiered on September 11, 2012, and ended on January 22, 2013. This season consisted of 15 episodes.

== Cast ==
=== Main cast ===
- Peter Krause as Adam Braverman
- Lauren Graham as Sarah Braverman
- Dax Shepard as Crosby Braverman
- Monica Potter as Kristina Braverman
- Erika Christensen as Julia Braverman-Graham
- Sam Jaeger as Joel Graham (14 episodes)
- Savannah Paige Rae as Sydney Graham (12 episodes)
- Xolo Maridueña as Victor Graham (14 episodes)
- Max Burkholder as Max Braverman (13 episodes)
- Joy Bryant as Jasmine Trussell (11 episodes)
- Tyree Brown as Jabbar Trussell (11 episodes)
- Miles Heizer as Drew Holt (11 episodes)
- Mae Whitman as Amber Holt
- Bonnie Bedelia as Camille Braverman (10 episodes+ 1 episode voice only)
- Craig T. Nelson as Zeek Braverman (12 episodes)

=== Recurring cast ===
- Sarah Ramos as Haddie Braverman
- Mia Allan and Ella Allan as Nora Braverman
- Jason Ritter as Mark Cyr
- Ray Romano as Hank Rizzoli
- Skyler Day as Amy Ellis
- Matt Lauria as Ryan York
- Tina Lifford as Renee Trussell
- Courtney Grosbeck as Ruby Rizzoli
- Kurt Fuller as Dr. Bedsloe
- Hayden Byerly as Micah Watson

== Episodes ==
No. overall	No. in season	Title	Directed by	Written by	Original release date	Prod. code	US viewers (millions)
54	1	"Family Portrait"	Lawrence Trilling	Jason Katims	September 11, 2012	401	5.48
The Braverman family gathers for a family portrait before Haddie leaves for college; Mark proves his commitment to Sarah by convincing Camille to let him in the family portrait. Julia and Joel struggle to adjust to Victor's behavior, and Julia ponders whether she will eventually form a bond with him. Sarah attempts to prove her worth as an assistant to photographer Hank Rizzoli, who is put off by her lack of experience. Amber works as a receptionist at the Luncheonette and has sex with one of the clients, to Adam's dismay. Renee starts teaching Jabbar how to pray, prompting Jasmine and Crosby, who are not religious, to contemplate how to approach the topic of spiritual beliefs with Jabbar. Haddie feels overwhelmed by Adam and Kristina's attempt to spend time with her. At the airport, Haddie tearfully embraces her parents before officially departing for Cornell.
55	2	"Left Field"	Lawrence Trilling	David Hudgins	September 18, 2012	402	4.98
Kristina and Adam grapple with Haddie's college departure and decide to buy a dog for Max. Amy breaks up with Drew on the first day of their senior year. Hank is annoyed by Sarah's talkative personality, but Sarah finds out that the gruff Hank has a softer, fatherly side when he gives Drew advice regarding Amy. Victor fakes being sick in order to avoid going to school. After two days, Julia insists that Victor has to attend school, but he is hesitant to leave the car. Julia promises to stay in the school parking lot if Victor needs help; Victor looks touched when he notices that Julia has upheld her promise. Crosby learns the importance of incorporating structure and boundaries in his marriage with Jasmine after he forgets to pick up Jabbar at school. During her mammogram appointment, Kristina receives life-changing news: she has breast cancer.
56	3	"Everything Is Not Okay"	Sam Jaeger	Bridget Carpenter	September 25, 2012	403	4.85
Adam and Kristina struggle to cope with the news of her breast cancer diagnosis. Kristina befriends Gwen, a fellow breast cancer survivor, while Adam informs Amber about Kristina's condition. While driving his grandchildren to school, Zeek is pulled over for an illegal U-turn and arrested for having an expired license. When the siblings discuss whether Zeek is too old to drive, Crosby absentmindedly reveals his heart medication. The siblings later try to confront Zeek about his health, but he storms out. Sarah tries to convince Hank to take on a wedding photoshoot and grows frustrated by his patronizing behavior. Max grows obsessed over the school's removal of the vending machines, affecting his friendship with Micah. Max ultimately decides to run for student body president, hoping to use the position to convince the school board to return the vending machines.
57	4	"The Talk"	Patrick Norris	Sarah Watson	October 2, 2012	404	4.45
While listening to a live session at the Luncheonette, Jabbar overhears the rapper using the word "nigga". Crosby tells Jabbar not to repeat the term but struggles to properly explain the word's connotations, leading Jasmine to teach Jabbar about the historical context of the slur. Camille pushes Zeek to volunteer at a local veterans center; Zeek forms a close bond with Ryan, a young veteran who recently served in Afghanistan. Sarah tries to help Hank bond with his eleven-year-old daughter Ruby, who is unenthusiastic about visiting her father. Trying to distract from her cancer diagnosis, Kristina reschedules the date of her surgery to accommodate Max's school election, but Adam convinces her to change it back. At Julia and Joel's suggestion, Victor tries out for the baseball team, but angrily storms off when he misses the pitches. Joel has a heartfelt talk with Victor and convinces him to try out again.
58	5	"There's Something I Need to Tell You..."	Patrick Norris	Jason Katims	October 9, 2012	405	4.95
Adam and Kristina tell Haddie about Kristina's cancer diagnosis, though they tell her not to worry. Crosby questions his ownership share in the Luncheonette when he discovers that Adam has a higher salary than him. While teaching Sarah how to develop film, Hank suddenly kisses her; Sarah sets boundaries with Hank, and later asks Mark to move in together. An overworked Julia struggles to balance the pressures of her job and the needs of her family, and she experiences a nervous breakdown in front of Joel. After being reprimanded by her boss for missing an important deadline, Julia quits her job. The family gathers to watch Victor's first baseball game, and Zeek invites Ryan to attend; Ryan and Amber bond. Concerned for her mother's health, Haddie returns to Berkeley and arrives just as the family celebrates Victor's game. Moved by Haddie's return, Kristina decides to divulge the news of her cancer to the rest of the family.
59	6	"I'll Be Right Here"	Jessica Yu	Sarah Goldfinger	October 23, 2012	406	4.85
Kristina is at a loss when she learns Max must give his speech in his bid for class president on the same day as her surgery, while Adam struggles to contain his nervous energy. Haddie considers cancelling her classes for the semester to help her parents, and she also tries to help Max with his speech. During his speech, Max uses Haddie's advice and relates his experience with Asperger's; he gains the support of his classmates and ends up winning the class president position. Drew is upset with Sarah's decision to move them into Mark's apartment. Ryan and Amber go out on a date; Ryan reveals that he wants to take things slow when Amber invites him into her apartment. After her surgery, Kristina learns that her tumor has advanced and that she needs to undergo chemotherapy. To prevent her from worrying and keep her focused on college, Adam and Kristina tell Haddie that the surgery was successful.
60	7	"Together"	Millicent Shelton	Eric Guggenheim	November 13, 2012	407	4.82
Adam and Kristina struggle to balance the pressures of daily life combined with her ongoing chemotherapy treatment. Camille and Crosby take on additional responsibility to alleviate the couple's burdens, and Camille helps serve as a maternal figure towards Kristina when Kristina's mother is unable to visit. Victor is having trouble making friends, and he tells Julia that he wants to reconnect with Miguel, a friend from his old neighborhood. Julia ignores the warnings of their social worker and sets out to reunite the two boys. Drew tries to win back Amy by telling her about Kristina's cancer diagnosis; Amy feels sympathetic towards him and the two rekindle their relationship. As Amber and Ryan's relationship grows, Zeek becomes concerned due to Ryan's past, and he tells Sarah that Ryan may not be ready to be in a relationship.
61	8	"One More Weekend With You"	Lawrence Trilling	Monica Beletsky	November 20, 2012	408	4.62
Julia and Joel try to accommodate the differing needs of their kids; Sydney feels jealous of the attention that her parents give Victor, leading Joel to suggest that Julia spend the day with Sydney. Crosby and Jasmine continue to adjust to life as a married couple as they organize a party for the parents of Jabbar's school. Adam and Kristina are forced to supervise a sleepover for Max and Micah, but the day turns awry when Kristina begins to experience the side effects of her chemotherapy. Adam crashes Crosby and Jasmine's party to take Crosby's marijuana, which Kristina uses to relieve her sickness. Sarah and Mark encounter a parenting dilemma when Mark accidentally walks in on Drew and Amy having sex. Amber joins Ryan on a road trip to attend the funeral of Ryan's military friend. Amber later discovers that Ryan's friend had committed suicide, and the two become closer as a couple as Ryan confides more about his past.
62	9	"You Can't Always Get What You Want"	Lawrence Trilling	Bridget Carpenter	November 27, 2012	409	4.49
Julia struggles to adjust to her new role as a stay-at-home mom, while Joel accepts a full-time construction job. Max refuses to attend the school dance, to Kristina's dismay. Adam realizes that Kristina is worried about missing out on her kids' events, and he convinces Max to attend the dance for Kristina's sake. At the Luncheonette, Crosby encounters Marleise, a disruptive neighbor who complains about the studio's loud noise; Julia warns Crosby that Marleise's complaints could result in the Luncheonette getting shut down. At a job interview, Ryan grows distressed when the interviewer probes him with questions about Afghanistan. Amber fails to comfort Ryan, leading her to seek advice from Zeek. Sarah and Mark plan to attend a wedding, but Sarah considers helping out Hank, who has booked a job in Los Angeles in order to visit Ruby. Frustrated by Sarah prioritizing Hank's needs over their relationship, Mark tells her not to attend the wedding.
63	10	"Trouble in Candyland"	Dylan K. Massin	Jesse Zwick	December 4, 2012	410	4.98
In Los Angeles, Sarah puts her energy into helping Hank mend his relationship with his ex-wife Sandy, who is planning to move to Minnesota with Ruby. Mark leaves the wedding to reconcile with Sarah, but instead finds Sarah and Hank getting drunk at their hotel. Growing increasingly impatient with his status in Sarah's life, Mark decides to end their engagement. Julia is concerned with Victor's frustration with school and seeks advice from Kristina on how to provide encouragement. At Amber's insistence, Joel reluctantly hires Ryan on his construction site despite Ryan's lack of experience. Crosby and Adam enter a contentious legal battle against Marleise to save the Luncheonette while attempting to record an album for musician Glen Hansard. When Marleise brings the issue to city council, Crosby gathers a group of the Luncheonette's neighbors to rally in support of keeping the studio open.
64	11	"What to My Wondering Eyes"	Hanelle Culpepper	Jason Katims	December 11, 2012	411	5.73
The holiday incites a mix of emotions among the Bravermans when Kristina suddenly goes into septic shock. When the doctors are not hopeful about Kristina's recovery, Kristina refers Adam to a prerecorded video on her computer, in which she says her goodbyes to the family. While babysitting Max and Nora, Crosby and Jasmine come to the realization that they want another child. Meanwhile, Sarah and Hank have sex after spending the day together. Zeek tries to restore the kids' belief in Santa Claus. Amber discovers from Julia that Ryan quit his job; Amber later confronts Ryan, who drunkenly lambasts her for trying to change him. The following day, Ryan tries to reconcile with Amber; Amber confesses that she loves him, but cannot continue their relationship, due to her family's experiences with Seth's alcoholism. Kristina makes a safe recovery from her septic shock, and the entire Braverman clan arrives to visit her at the hospital.
65	12	"Keep on Rowing"	Dax Shepard	David Hudgins	January 1, 2013	412	5.37
While partying with the Braverman women, Kristina instinctively pulls out a chunk of her hair and realizes she is experiencing hair loss; she immediately decides to shave her head, surprising Adam. Kristina initially feels self-conscious going out in public, but with the support of Adam, ultimately learns to embrace her new look. Sarah and Hank go on their first real date. Renee loses her job and asks Crosby and Jasmine for money. After discovering how dire her mother's financial situation is, Jasmine suggests Renee move in with them, much to Crosby's dismay. Victor wants to reach out to his biological mother, but Julia and Joel tell him that he legally cannot communicate with his mother, upsetting him. Sydney provokes Victor with questions about his biological mother; Victor snaps and hurls a baseball bat at her, smashing the window. Julia admonishes Victor, who later refuses to leave his room.
66	13	"Small Victories"	Peter Krause	Sarah Watson	January 8, 2013	413	5.30
Drew finds out that Amy is pregnant; Drew wants to keep the baby, but Amy is shaken by the news and wants to have an abortion. Mark turns to Sarah when he notices that Drew is being withdrawn at school. After having her abortion, Amy tells Drew that she needs some distance; Drew seeks emotional support from Sarah. Max hits puberty and Adam and Kristina try to help him navigate through life as a teenager. Crosby tries to adjust to Renee moving in with him and Jasmine, and is unhappy when Renee rejects a job offer because of its benefits. Victor begins to grow confrontational towards Julia and Joel and calls the police to falsely report Julia for child abuse, after which Julia and Joel receive a visit from their social worker. When Julia reveals her struggles with parenting Victor, the social worker asks them if they are considering not following through with the adoption; Joel immediately shuts down the idea, but Julia is hesitant, causing him to walk out.
67	14	"One Step Forward, Two Steps Back"	Lawrence Trilling	Bridget Carpenter	January 15, 2013	414	4.96
Zeek and Amber try to encourage Ryan to ask Joel for his job back. Joel is hesitant, but relents when Ryan thanks him for giving him a chance. As Victor's adoption deadline draws near, Julia and Joel are at odds as they contemplate the long-term effects of the decision. After Crosby relates his experiences raising Jabbar, Julia decides to finalize Victor's adoption. Julia and Joel tell Victor, who seems pleased by the news. Renee oversteps her boundaries in Crosby and Jasmine's house and disagrees with Crosby over her parenting skills. Jasmine tries to convince Crosby to apologize to Renee, but Crosby pushes Jasmine to learn how to confront her mother. Sarah and Mark decide to go out for coffee, during which Sarah reveals that Hank kissed her while she and Mark were dating. Mark angrily confronts Hank and professes his love for Sarah. When the PTA vetoes the return of the vending machines, Kristina supports Max with a unique campaign that is successful in bringing the vending machines back to the school.
68	15	"Because You're My Sister"	Lawrence Trilling	Jason Katims	January 22, 2013	415	4.87
As Kristina nears the end of her chemotherapy, she learns that Gwen's cancer has returned. Adam and Kristina later discover that Kristina is cancer-free, and Adam surprises her with a trip to Hawaii. Drew gets accepted into his dream college, and he reveals the news to Amy. Sarah is forced to make a decision about her relationships with Mark and Hank. Sarah ultimately chooses to pursue a relationship with Hank, but learns that he is moving to Minnesota to be closer with his daughter. Despite the move, Hank tells Sarah that he loves her. Ryan begins going back to therapy and professes his love for Amber; the two rekindle their relationship. While Jasmine and Crosby plan an anniversary getaway, Renee decides to move out. Crosby makes peace with Renee when Jasmine reveals that she is pregnant. As Julia and Joel prepare for Victor's adoption ceremony, Sydney refuses to attend; Victor tells her to attend the ceremony because they are siblings. The entire Braverman family, including Sydney, attend the ceremony and celebrate Victor's adoption.

== Ratings ==
=== U.S. Live Ratings ===
#	Episode	Air Date	Rating	18-49 (Rating/Share)	Viewers (m)	Ref
1	"Family Portrait"	September 11, 2012	TBA	1.9/5	5.48	
2	"Left Field"	September 18, 2012	TBA	1.8/5	4.98	
3	"Everything Is Not Okay"	September 25, 2012	TBA	1.8/5	4.85	
4	"The Talk"	October 2, 2012	TBA	1.6/5	4.45	
5	"There's Something I Need to Tell You..."	October 9, 2012	TBA	2.0/6	4.95	
6	"I'll Be Right Here"	October 23, 2012	TBA	1.9/5	4.85	
7	"Together"	November 13, 2012	TBA	1.9/5	4.82	
8	"One More Weekend With You"	November 20, 2012	TBA	1.7/5	4.62	
9	"You Can't Always Get What You Want"	November 27, 2012	TBA	1.8/5	4.49	
10	"Trouble in Candyland"	December 4, 2012	TBA	1.8/5	4.98	
11	"What to My Wondering Eyes"	December 11, 2012	TBA	2.0/6	5.73	
12	"Keep on Rowing"	January 1, 2013	TBA	1.8/5	5.37	
13	"Small Victories"	January 8, 2013	TBA	1.9/6	5.30	
14	"One Step Forward, Two Steps Back"	January 15, 2013	TBA	1.9/5	4.96	
15	"Because You're My Sister"	January 22, 2013	TBA	1.8/5	4.87	
