= Parenthood season 1 =

Parenthood
- Season 1
- DVD cover
- No. of episodes: 13

Release
- Original network: NBC
- Original release: March 2 – May 25, 2010

Season chronology
- Next → Season 2

The first season of the NBC comedy-drama series Parenthood premiered on March 2, 2010, and ended on May 25, 2010, it consisted of 13 episodes. Season one was released on DVD in Region 1 on August 31, 2010, and Region 4 on December 1, 2010.

== Cast ==
=== Main cast ===
- Peter Krause as Adam Braverman (13 episodes)
- Lauren Graham as Sarah Braverman (13 episodes)
- Dax Shepard as Crosby Braverman (13 episodes)
- Monica Potter as Kristina Braverman (13 episodes)
- Erika Christensen as Julia Braverman-Graham (13 episodes)
- Sam Jaeger as Joel Graham (13 episodes)
- Savannah Paige Rae as Sydney Graham (13 episodes)
- Sarah Ramos as Haddie Braverman (13 episodes)
- Max Burkholder as Max Braverman (13 episodes)
- Joy Bryant as Jasmine Trussell (12 episodes)
- Miles Heizer as Drew Holt (12 episodes)
- Mae Whitman as Amber Holt (13 episodes)
- Bonnie Bedelia as Camille Braverman (10 episodes)
- Craig T. Nelson as Zeek Braverman (10 episodes)

=== Recurring cast ===
- Tyree Brown as Jabbar Trussell
- Erinn Hayes as Racquel
- Marguerite Moreau as Katie
- Tom Amandes as Dr. Pelikan
- Jason Ritter as Mark Cyr
- Minka Kelly as Gaby
- Asher Book as Steve Williams
- Phil Abrams as Phil Lessing
- Amanda Foreman as Suze Lessing
- Eduardo Rioseco as Damien
- Mike O'Malley as Jim Kazinsky
- Tina Lifford as Renee Trussell

== Production ==
Parenthood was originally scheduled to premiere on NBC on September 23, 2009. However, on July 10, 2009, it was announced that Parenthood would be pushed back to midseason, because of actress Maura Tierney's breast cancer. Subsequently, on September 10, 2009, a spokesperson for Tierney announced that she was leaving the show due to conflicts with her treatment schedule. Tierney's already-filmed scenes were deleted. On October 9, 2009, it was announced that Lauren Graham would replace Tierney in the upcoming series. Parenthood was expected to premiere March 1, 2010, and air on Monday nights at 9:00 p.m. However, after the cancellation of The Jay Leno Show, NBC moved the premiere to March 2, 2010, at 10:00 p.m.

== Episodes ==
No. overall	No. in season	Title	Directed by	Written by	Original release date	Prod. code	US viewers (millions)
1	1	"Pilot"	Thomas Schlamme	Jason Katims	March 2, 2010	101	8.10
Single mother Sarah Braverman and her two children Amber and Drew move back home with her parents, Zeek and Camille. Sarah's younger sister and complete antithesis, Julia, is a successful corporate attorney struggling to juggle work and motherhood, alongside her stay-at-home husband, Joel. Julia sets up Sarah with Sarah's old high-school sweetheart, Jim. Commitment-phobe Crosby, Sarah's younger brother, must accept adult responsibility when an old flame Jasmine shows up unexpectedly, introducing him to his son, Jabbar. Adam, the oldest Braverman sibling, gets banned from coaching and attending his son Max's baseball games after a scuffle with the baseball umpire over a bad call. Adam, his wife Kristina, and their teenage daughter Haddie learn that Max may have Asperger's. Although each sibling and family has its own share of life to grapple with, perhaps this reunion is the push they need to help each other pick up the pieces and focus on the everyday challenges that families face while raising children and starting over. The pilot is dedicated in memory of NBC Universal executive Nora O'Brien, who died while on set in Berkeley from a brain aneurysm.
2	2	"Man Versus Possum"	Lawrence Trilling	Jason Katims	March 9, 2010	102	6.08
Adam struggles to rid his house and yard of a possum. Max's behaviorial therapist, Dr. Pelikan, diagnoses Max with Asperger's; Adam reveals the news to his siblings. Sarah begins job hunting, and lands an interview for a graphic design job with a little help from Adam and her father. However, Sarah doesn't get the job because she does not have a college degree. At school, Amber finds out that she is being put back to 10th grade, as her grades from her former school in Fresno are unsatisfactory. After Sarah speaks with the principal, Amber is allowed to go into 11th grade. Julia is annoyed by Racquel, another mother from Sydney's school, and tensions come to a head at the school's fundraising auction. Crosby spends time with Jabbar, though he doesn't know how to tell his girlfriend Katie that he has a son. Crosby discovers that Jasmine and Jabbar are moving back to Berkeley.
3	3	"The Deep End of the Pool"	Lawrence Trilling	Jeff Greenstein	March 16, 2010	103	5.94
Adam and Kristina fight to get their son into an exclusive private school, Footpath, after Max is expelled from his former school. While meeting with Footpath, Adam and Kristina miss Haddie's soccer game; they learn that Haddie feels like they have always paid more attention to Max. Crosby tries to bond with Jabbar but struggles to connect with and integrate him into his life. Katie meets Jabbar when Crosby brings him to the recording studio, but he does not introduce Jabbar as his son. After finding condoms in Zeek's den, Sarah confronts her father, believing that he is having an affair. Julia, a prominent high school swimmer, is dissatisfied with the methods used in Sydney's Zen swimming class, so she takes matters into her own hands by attempting to teach her daughter how to swim. Sarah breaks up with Jim.
4	4	"Wassup"	Michael Engler	Tyler Bensinger	March 23, 2010	104	7.01
After investigating Haddie's expensive cell phone bill, Adam and Kristina get Crosby to hack into her computer, and they discover that Haddie has a boyfriend named Steve. They confront Haddie about the relationship, who is enraged over their violation of privacy. Adam ultimately learns to accept Haddie's newfound independence. Sarah is concerned about Drew masturbating too much; she rejects her father's offer of help, and instead persuades Adam to talk to Drew. Julia and Joel have a date night, and they reluctantly let Amber babysit Sydney for the evening. While out, they run into Racquel and her husband, who are also on a "date night" with their daughter. Crosby keeps Jabbar overnight while Jasmine has a dance audition, but calls Julia for help when Jabbar gets his thumb stuck in a soda can. Julia encourages Crosby to seek a paternity test, as Crosby has legal and financial obligations if he is Jabbar's biological father.
5	5	"The Situation"	Michael Engler	Becky Hartman-Edwards	March 30, 2010	105	6.23
Sarah strikes up a friendship with Amber's English teacher, Mark Cyr, who praises Amber's book report on The Sound and the Fury, which Sarah later discovers that Amber plagiarized. Julia tries to coach Sydney to stand up for herself against Racquel's dominant daughter Harmony. Haddie invites her boyfriend over for dinner, to Adam's dismay. Max rejoins the baseball team, and Adam and Drew help Max practice. Drew, having never had a stable father figure, enjoys spending time with Adam and is upset when Adam cancels plans so that he can take Max for ice cream. Adam tells Sarah about Jabbar. Seeking a paternity test, Crosby confronts Jasmine, who is initially outraged, but ultimately relents. Katie confides to Crosby about wanting to have a baby with him. Right before Katie plans to throw out her birth control pills, Crosby reveals the existence of his son; Katie is enraged and ends their relationship.
6	6	"The Big 'O'"	Adam Davidson	Lauren Schmidt Hissrich	April 6, 2010	106	6.28
Kristina's constant worry about Max affects her and Adam's sex life. Max begins working with a young behavioral aide, Gaby; Kristina feels threatened by Gaby's ability to get through to Max, but eventually confides in her after having a breakdown. Adam is distraught to learn that Kristina feels unsatisfied in their sex life. Jabbar's paternity test reveals that Crosby is his biological father. Upon discovering the results, Crosby musters enough courage to reveal the existence of Jabbar to Camille and Zeek. Sarah continues to bond with Mark, but feels conflicted when he asks her out. While attending Jabbar and Sydney's play group, Crosby notices romantic tension between Racquel and Joel, and informs Julia. Joel reveals to Julia that Racquel tried to make a move on him, but he turned her down. Julia wants to cut contact with Racquel, but decides to overlook the situation because of Sydney and Harmony's friendship.
7	7	"What's Goin' On Down There?"	Adam Davidson	Sarah Watson	April 13, 2010	107	6.28
Adam is stressed from a busy schedule and taking care of everyone else. While attending a family yoga class, Crosby meets another single parent, Valerie, who invites Crosby and Jabbar for a play date. Valerie later tries to seduce Crosby, but Crosby is worried about leaving Jabbar alone for too long and turns her down. Haddie spends Career Day at Julia's law firm, prompting both Julia and Kristina to re-evaluate their respective career choices; Julia remembers why she studied law in the first place, while Kristina is upset that Haddie does not look up to her. Sarah pursues a relationship with Mark, but Adam warns her that Amber has also developed a crush on Mark. Sarah reveals her new relationship to Amber, who does not take the news well. Realizing that she needs to focus on her family, Sarah breaks up with Mark, while an upset Amber reconnects with Damien, her boyfriend from Fresno.
8	8	"Rubber Band Ball"	Lawrence Trilling	Jan Oxenberg	April 20, 2010	108	7.27
When Sydney grows obsessed with a rubber band ball, Julia seeks advice from Kristina, worried that Sydney might also have Asperger's. However, Julia and Joel learn from Dr. Pelikan that Sydney is actually gifted. Sarah finds out that Damien has arrived from Fresno, resulting in an argument. After being comforted by Camille, Sarah seeks out to reconcile with Amber, who later decides to break up with Damien. Zeek takes Adam on a road trip for investment advice. When questioned by Adam, Zeek admits that he is facing serious financial trouble, but instructs Adam to keep it a secret from Camille. Crosby wants to help plan Jabbar's birthday party, but Jasmine reveals that her family thinks Crosby abandoned Jabbar. During the party, Jasmine's family criticize Crosby for being an absent father; Jasmine defends Crosby and admits that she did not tell Crosby about Jabbar until recently. The revelation brings Jasmine and Crosby closer, and Jasmine shows Crosby the video of Jabbar's birth.
9	9	"Perchance to Dream"	Lawrence Trilling	Becky Hartman-Edwards	April 27, 2010	109	5.81
One of Kristina's old acquaintances runs for Lieutenant Governor in Sacramento, and she leaves Max and Haddie with Adam for the weekend. Kristina is excited by the opportunity to help, but is hesitant to return to work full-time when she is offered a job as a communications director. Adam has his hands full with taking care of the kids, and he gives Drew girl advice as a school dance approaches. Concerned that Haddie may be having sex, Adam forbids her from visiting Steve's house. Sarah tries to get Amber excited about college by taking her to an event on campus, and unexpectedly runs into Jim, who publicly recites a poem about his sexual encounter with Sarah. Sydney breaks a vase and lies about it; Julia attempts to teach Sydney a lesson about lying by leaving the shards on the floor until Sydney confesses. Crosby takes Jasmine on a real date, but they decide to keep it a secret from Jabbar.
10	10	"Namaste No More"	Ken Whittingham	Tyler Bensinger	May 4, 2010	110	5.88
As Crosby and Jasmine's romantic fling continues, they have to decide how to explain it to Jabbar. Crosby finally reveals that he wants to pursue a real relationship with Jasmine, but she wants to take things slow. Julia becomes the new coach of Sydney's soccer team, which turns competitive when she discovers that Racquel is the coach of the opposing team. Adam and Kristina are on the search to help Max make friends, but find that the process is a bigger challenge than they thought. Haddie breaks up with Steve when he starts pressuring her into having sex and she seeks advice from Amber. Steve begins to regularly visit Amber at work and the two bond. Sarah finds Zeek's personal items at a pawn shop and learns of her father's financial troubles. The Braverman siblings confront Zeek in front of Camille, who kicks him out of the house. Camille privately reveals to Sarah that Zeek had an affair with another woman.
11	11	"Solace"	Ken Whittingham	Jeff Greenstein	May 11, 2010	111	5.93
Having been kicked out by Camille, Zeek becomes Adam and Kristina's houseguest. Amber and Steve have sex, but Amber feels guilty for betraying Haddie. Still upset over her break-up with Steve, Haddie is encouraged to throw a sleepover party by Kristina. Haddie invites Amber, who tearfully confesses that she had sex with Steve, creating a rift between the two girls. In an effort to resolve her father's financial troubles, Julia enlists the help of her fund manager ex-boyfriend Timm, whom Joel strongly dislikes. Crosby contemplates settling down with Jasmine and Jabbar. Camille begins to focus on her art, converting her attic into an art studio. While attending an art gallery with Camille, Sarah sees her mother flirting with her art teacher, Matthew; Camille later admits to Sarah that she had sex with Matthew. Sarah tells Adam about Zeek's affair. Adam reserves his knowledge about his father's infidelity to Crosby and Julia, but angrily confronts Zeek for being unfaithful.
12	12	"Team Braverman"	Lawrence Trilling	Jan Oxenberg	May 18, 2010	112	6.24
Max tries to enlist the family's help in gaining mileage for the Walk for Autism coming up, still unknowing that he has Asperger's and that it falls on the autism spectrum. Adam and Kristina debate telling Max that he has Asperger's, but ultimately decide to wait. Jasmine auditions for a prestigious dance company, and Crosby learns that she may move to New York if she lands the audition. Zeek becomes suspicious about Camille and Matthew's relationship. Julia volunteers to be on the Angel committee at Sydney's school, but is annoyed when she has to take care of a single mom recovering from a breast augmentation. Haddie and Amber get into a fight at school, after which Haddie reveals to her parents that Amber had sex with Steve. The revelation creates tension between the two families, particularly Sarah and Kristina, who disagree over their daughters' behavior. After being confronted by Adam, Sarah tells him that she is tired of being the problem, and that she feels moving to Berkeley was a mistake.
13	13	"Lost and Found"	Lawrence Trilling	Jason Katims	May 25, 2010	113	6.04
Tensions continue to run high between Sarah and Kristina, who disapproves of Adam helping Drew practice for baseball tryouts. Meanwhile, Adam and Sarah tell Julia and Crosby about Zeek's infidelity. Zeek temporarily moves in with Crosby, but Crosby criticizes him for his actions; Julia also rebukes Zeek when he shuts down a financial meeting with Timm. Jasmine's audition is successful, and Crosby reveals that he wants to move with them to New York to be present in Jabbar's life. After Sarah blames Amber for causing a division within the family, Amber runs away. Upon discovering that Amber is missing, Sarah and Kristina resolve their differences to help find Amber. A distressed Amber calls Sarah at a truck stop in Gilroy; Haddie and Kristina arrive at the truck stop, and Haddie forgives Amber. Sarah and Amber reconcile. The following day, Zeek arrives at the house to win back Camille, making a heartfelt pronouncement of their love in front of the family. Camille accepts the apology, and the entire family convenes to watch Drew's baseball tryouts.

== Ratings ==
=== U.S. live ratings ===
#	Episode	Air date	Rating	Share	18-49 (rating/share)	Viewers (m)
1	"Pilot"	March 2, 2010	5.0	9	3.1/9	8.10
2	"Man Versus Possum"	March 9, 2010	4.0	7	2.6/8	6.08
3	"The Deep End of the Pool"	March 16, 2010	3.9	7	2.3/6	5.94
4	"Wassup"	March 23, 2010	4.5	8	2.7/8	7.01
5	"The Situation"	March 30, 2010	4.1	7	2.5/7	6.23
6	"The Big 'O'"	April 6, 2010	4.0	7	2.6/7	6.28
7	"What's Goin' On Down There?"	April 13, 2010	4.2	7	2.5/7	6.28
8	"Rubber Band Ball"	April 20, 2010	4.8	8	2.9/8	7.27
9	"Perchance to Dream"	April 27, 2010	3.8	6	2.4/7	5.81
10	"Namaste No More"	May 4, 2010	3.9	7	2.5/7	5.88
11	"Solace"	May 11, 2010	3.9	7	2.6/7	5.93
12	"Team Braverman"	May 18, 2010	4.0	7	2.6/7	6.24
13	"Lost and Found"	May 25, 2010	3.9	6	2.6/7	6.04
