= Miles Heizer =

American actor (born 1994)

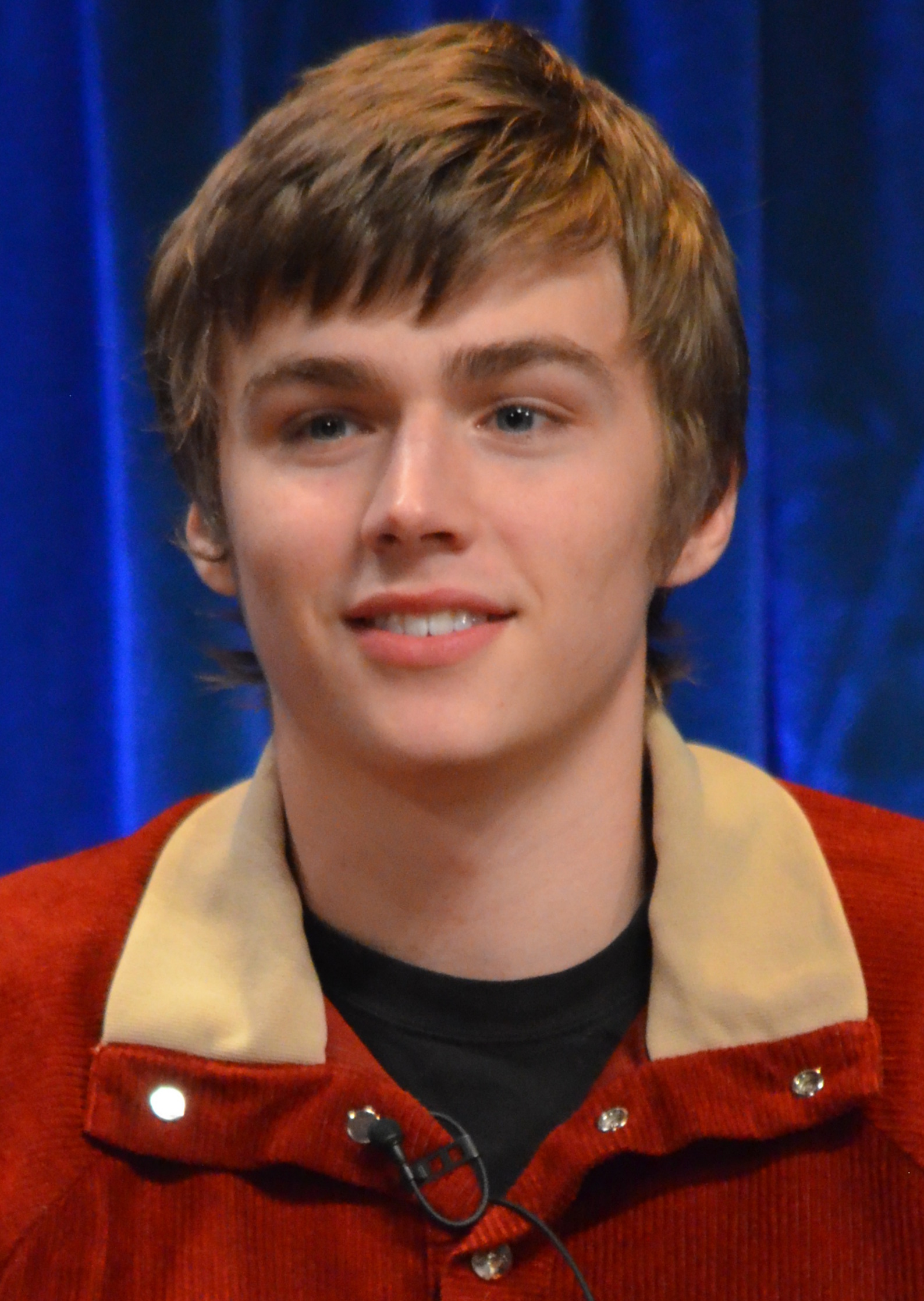
- Heizer at PaleyFest, 2013
- Born: Miles Dominic Heizer; May 16, 1994 (age 32); Greenville, Kentucky, U.S.
- Occupation: Actor
- Years active: 2005–present

Miles Dominic Heizer (born May 16, 1994) is an American actor. On television, he is known for portraying Alex Standall in the Netflix original series 13 Reasons Why, Cameron Cope in the Netflix series Boots, and Drew Holt in the NBC drama series Parenthood. He has also appeared in the films Rails & Ties (2007), The Stanford Prison Experiment (2015), Nerve (2016), and Love, Simon (2018).

== Early life ==
Miles Dominic Heizer was born on May 16, 1994, in Greenville, Kentucky. His mother is a nurse. Heizer and his older sister were raised by their single mother and grandmother in what he described as "a super conservative, religious family". As a child, Heizer performed in a number of community theater productions in Lexington, Kentucky. His family moved to Los Angeles when he was ten years old to support his acting career.

== Career ==
Heizer starred in the short film Paramedic as Young James. Heizer has since guest-starred in episodes of Ghost Whisperer, Shark, Bones, and Private Practice.

In 2007, Heizer played the role of Davey Danner at 12 years old in the film Rails & Ties, for which he was nominated for the Young Artist Award for Best Leading Young Actor in a Feature Film. That same year, he had a recurring role as Joshua Lipnicki on the NBC medical drama television series ER. In 2010, he was cast as Drew Holt, the son of Lauren Graham's character, on the NBC drama series Parenthood. Heizer portrayed Drew until the series' ending in 2015.

In 2013, Heizer co-starred as Josh in the film Rudderless. In 2015, he had a supporting role as Marshall Lovett in the drama-thriller film The Stanford Prison Experiment, which premiered at the Sundance Film Festival on January 26. In 2016, Heizer starred as Tommy Mancuso in the film Nerve, and from 2017 to 2020, he played Alex Standall in the Netflix original series 13 Reasons Why. He also played Cal Price, one of Simon's classmates, in the 2018 film Love, Simon.

In 2018, Heizer was featured in clothing retailer Gap's Logo Remix campaign. Heizer was also featured in Coach's fall and winter 2019 fashion campaigns, and in 2021 he was featured in Coach's Pride is Where You Find It campaign.

In May 2023, Netflix announced that Heizer would be starring in The Corps, a drama about a gay teenager who enlists in the U.S. Marine Corps. Norman Lear and Peter Hoar are two of the executive producers. The series is based on the book The Pink Marine by Greg Cope White. In August 2025, Netflix announced that the series had been renamed Boots and premiered on October 9, 2025.

== Personal life ==
At the age of 19, Heizer came out as gay and part of the LGBT community.

== Filmography ==
Key
†	Denotes films that have not yet been released

=== Film ===
Year	Title	Role	Notes
2007	Rails & Ties	Davey Danner	
2013	Rudderless	Josh	
2015	Memoria	Simon	
2015	The Stanford Prison Experiment	Marshall Lovett	
2016	Nerve	Tommy	
2017	Roman J. Israel, Esq.	Kyle Owens (Teenager #1)	
2018	Love, Simon	Cal Price	
2023	Ex-Husbands	Mickey Pearce	
2026	People We Meet on Vacation	David Nilsen	

=== Television ===
Year	Title	Role	Notes
2005	CSI: Miami	Joey Everton	Episode: "Nothing to Lose"
2006	Ghost Whisperer	Jake Morrison	Episode: "Drowned Lives"
2007	ER	Joshua Lipnicki	4 episodes
2007	Bones	Joey	Episode: "Death in the Saddle"
2007	Private Practice	Michael	Episode: "In Which Addison Has a Very Casual Get Together"
2007	Shark	Jackie Buckner	Episode: "Strange Bedfellows"
2009	Cold Case	Keith Oats	Episode: "Forensics"
2010–2015	Parenthood	Drew Holt	Main role
2017–2020	13 Reasons Why	Alex Standall	Main role
2018	Beyond the Reasons	Himself	Seasons 1 & 2
2018	RuPaul's Drag Race	Himself, guest judge	Season 10, episode 10
2025	Boots	Cameron Cope	Main role

== Awards and nominations ==
Year	Award	Category	Nominated work	Result	Ref.
2008	29th Young Artist Awards	Best Leading Young Actor in a Feature Film	Rails & Ties	Nominated	
2026	14th Queerties Awards	TV Performance	Boots	Nominated	
