= No Good Deed =

No good deed goes unpunished (often shortened to No Good Deed) is a sardonic commentary on the frequency with which acts of kindness backfire on those who offer them.

No Good Deed may also refer to:

- No Good Deed (2002 film), an American film by Bob Rafelson
- No Good Deed (2014 film), an American film by Sam Miller
- No Good Deed (2017 film), an American short film featuring Deadpool
- No Good Deed (TV series), a 2024 American comedy series
- No Good Deed (novel), by John Niven (2017)
- "No Good Deed" (song), a 2003 song from the Broadway musical Wicked
- "No Good Deed" (Daredevil)
- "No Good Deed" (CSI: NY), a 2009 episode of CSI: New York
- "No Good Deed" (Parenthood), a 2010 episode of Parenthood
- "No Good Deed" (Person of Interest), an episode of the American television drama series Person of Interest
- "No Good Deed Goes Unpunished", a 2021 song from the Van Morrison album Latest Record Project, Volume 1

== See also ==
- Only the good die young (disambiguation)
- Nice guys finish last
