= List of Parenthood episodes =

Parenthood is an American comedy drama television series developed by Jason Katims and based upon the 1989 film of the same name produced by Brian Grazer and directed by Ron Howard, both of whom serve as executive producers along with Katims, David Nevins and Lawrence Trilling. The series premiered on March 2, 2010, on NBC. On May 11, 2014, NBC renewed Parenthood for a sixth and final season, which would consist of 13 episodes. On June 2, 2014, it was announced that the final season would premiere September 25, 2014. The series finale aired on January 29, 2015.

During the course of the series, 103 episodes of Parenthood aired over six seasons.

== Series overview ==
Season	Episodes	Originally released	
Season	Episodes	First released	Last released
1	13	March 2, 2010	May 25, 2010
2	22	September 14, 2010	April 19, 2011
3	18	September 13, 2011	February 28, 2012
4	15	September 11, 2012	January 22, 2013
5	22	September 26, 2013	April 17, 2014
6	13	September 25, 2014	January 29, 2015

== Episodes ==
=== Season 1 (2010) ===
No. overall	No. in season	Title	Directed by	Written by	Original release date	Prod. code	US viewers (millions)
1	1	"Pilot"	Thomas Schlamme	Jason Katims	March 2, 2010	101	8.10
2	2	"Man Versus Possum"	Lawrence Trilling	Jason Katims	March 9, 2010	102	6.08
3	3	"The Deep End of the Pool"	Lawrence Trilling	Jeff Greenstein	March 16, 2010	103	5.94
4	4	"Wassup"	Michael Engler	Tyler Bensinger	March 23, 2010	104	7.01
5	5	"The Situation"	Michael Engler	Becky Hartman-Edwards	March 30, 2010	105	6.23
6	6	"The Big 'O'"	Adam Davidson	Lauren Schmidt Hissrich	April 6, 2010	106	6.28
7	7	"What's Goin' On Down There?"	Adam Davidson	Sarah Watson	April 13, 2010	107	6.28
8	8	"Rubber Band Ball"	Lawrence Trilling	Jan Oxenberg	April 20, 2010	108	7.27
9	9	"Perchance to Dream"	Lawrence Trilling	Becky Hartman-Edwards	April 27, 2010	109	5.81
10	10	"Namaste No More"	Ken Whittingham	Tyler Bensinger	May 4, 2010	110	5.88
11	11	"Solace"	Ken Whittingham	Jeff Greenstein	May 11, 2010	111	5.93
12	12	"Team Braverman"	Lawrence Trilling	Jan Oxenberg	May 18, 2010	112	6.24
13	13	"Lost and Found"	Lawrence Trilling	Jason Katims	May 25, 2010	113	6.04

=== Season 2 (2010–11) ===
No. overall	No. in season	Title	Directed by	Written by	Original release date	Prod. code	US viewers (millions)
14	1	"I Hear You, I See You"	Lawrence Trilling	Jason Katims	September 14, 2010	201	7.60
15	2	"No Good Deed"	Lawrence Trilling	Tyler Bensinger	September 21, 2010	202	5.85
16	3	"I'm Cooler Than You Think"	Michael Waxman	Bridget Carpenter	September 28, 2010	203	4.83
17	4	"Date Night"	Adam Bernstein	David Hudgins	October 5, 2010	204	5.16
18	5	"The Booth Job"	Adam Davidson	Kerry Ehrin	October 12, 2010	205	4.66
19	6	"Orange Alert"	Adam Davidson	Sarah Watson	October 19, 2010	206	4.87
20	7	"Seven Names"	Jan Eliasberg	Eric Guggenheim	October 26, 2010	207	4.94
21	8	"If This Boat is a Rockin'"	Allison Liddi-Brown	Tyler Bensinger	November 9, 2010	208	4.99
22	9	"Put Yourself Out There"	Patrick Norris	Bridget Carpenter	November 16, 2010	209	4.81
23	10	"Happy Thanksgiving"	Bob Berlinger	David Hudgins	November 23, 2010	210	4.47
24	11	"Damage Control"	Lawrence Trilling	Kerry Ehrin	January 4, 2011	211	5.98
25	12	"Meet the New Boss"	Lawrence Trilling	Sarah Watson	January 11, 2011	212	5.58
26	13	"Opening Night"	Ken Whittingham	Monica Henderson	January 18, 2011	213	5.58
27	14	"A House Divided"	Ken Whittingham	Tyler Bensinger	February 1, 2011	214	6.18
28	15	"Just Go Home"	Lawrence Trilling	Bridget Carpenter	February 8, 2011	215	5.22
29	16	"Amazing Andy and His Wonderful World of Bugs"	Lawrence Trilling	Kerry Ehrin	February 15, 2011	216	5.12
30	17	"Do Not Sleep With Your Autistic Nephew's Therapist"	Jason Katims	Jason Katims	February 22, 2011	217	5.53
31	18	"Qualities and Difficulties"	Bob Berlinger	Bridget Carpenter	March 1, 2011	218	5.03
32	19	"Taking the Leap"	Andrew Bernstein	David Hudgins	March 29, 2011	219	4.89
33	20	"New Plan"	Michael Weaver	Jamie Duneier	April 5, 2011	220	4.76
34	21	"Slipping Away"	Lawrence Trilling	Kerry Ehrin	April 12, 2011	221	5.22
35	22	"Hard Times Come Again No More"	Lawrence Trilling	Jason Katims	April 19, 2011	222	6.32

=== Season 3 (2011–12) ===
No. overall	No. in season	Title	Directed by	Written by	Original release date	Prod. code	US viewers (millions)
36	1	"I Don't Want to Do This Without You"	Lawrence Trilling	Jason Katims	September 13, 2011	301	6.29
37	2	"Hey, If You're Not Using That Baby..."	Lawrence Trilling	Kerry Ehrin	September 20, 2011	302	5.28
38	3	"Step Right Up"	Adam Davidson	David Hudgins	September 27, 2011	303	5.53
39	4	"Clear Skies From Here on Out"	Adam Davidson	Bridget Carpenter	October 4, 2011	304	5.05
40	5	"Nora"	Allison Liddi-Brown	Jason Katims	October 11, 2011	305	5.26
41	6	"Tales From the Luncheonette"	Allison Liddi-Brown	Kerry Ehrin	October 18, 2011	306	5.03
42	7	"Forced Family Fun"	Patrick Norris	Sarah Watson	November 1, 2011	307	5.29
43	8	"In-Between"	Patrick Norris	Eric Guggenheim	November 8, 2011	308	5.30
44	9	"Sore Loser"	Lawrence Trilling	Bridget Carpenter	November 15, 2011	309	5.06
45	10	"Mr. Honesty"	Lawrence Trilling	Monica Henderson Beletsky	November 22, 2011	310	4.57
46	11	"Missing"	Dylan K. Massin	Sarah Watson	November 29, 2011	311	5.76
47	12	"Road Trip"	Jessica Yu	David Hudgins	January 3, 2012	312	4.94
48	13	"Just Smile"	Michael Weaver	Jamie Duneier	January 10, 2012	313	4.70
49	14	"It Is What It Is"	Michael Weaver	Eric Guggenheim	January 17, 2012	314	4.97
50	15	"Politics"	Peter Krause	Sarah Watson	February 7, 2012	315	4.63
51	16	"Tough Love"	Lawrence Trilling	Monica Henderson Beletsky	February 14, 2012	316	4.48
52	17	"Remember Me, I'm the One Who Loves You"	Jason Katims	Kerry Ehrin	February 21, 2012	317	4.91
53	18	"My Brother's Wedding"	Lawrence Trilling	Jason Katims	February 28, 2012	318	5.16

=== Season 4 (2012–13) ===
No. overall	No. in season	Title	Directed by	Written by	Original release date	Prod. code	US viewers (millions)
54	1	"Family Portrait"	Lawrence Trilling	Jason Katims	September 11, 2012	401	5.48
55	2	"Left Field"	Lawrence Trilling	David Hudgins	September 18, 2012	402	4.98
56	3	"Everything Is Not Okay"	Sam Jaeger	Bridget Carpenter	September 25, 2012	403	4.85
57	4	"The Talk"	Patrick Norris	Sarah Watson	October 2, 2012	404	4.45
58	5	"There's Something I Need to Tell You..."	Patrick Norris	Jason Katims	October 9, 2012	405	4.95
59	6	"I'll Be Right Here"	Jessica Yu	Sarah Goldfinger	October 23, 2012	406	4.85
60	7	"Together"	Millicent Shelton	Eric Guggenheim	November 13, 2012	407	4.82
61	8	"One More Weekend With You"	Lawrence Trilling	Monica Beletsky	November 20, 2012	408	4.62
62	9	"You Can't Always Get What You Want"	Lawrence Trilling	Bridget Carpenter	November 27, 2012	409	4.49
63	10	"Trouble in Candyland"	Dylan K. Massin	Jesse Zwick	December 4, 2012	410	4.98
64	11	"What to My Wondering Eyes"	Hanelle Culpepper	Jason Katims	December 11, 2012	411	5.73
65	12	"Keep on Rowing"	Dax Shepard	David Hudgins	January 1, 2013	412	5.37
66	13	"Small Victories"	Peter Krause	Sarah Watson	January 8, 2013	413	5.30
67	14	"One Step Forward, Two Steps Back"	Lawrence Trilling	Bridget Carpenter	January 15, 2013	414	4.96
68	15	"Because You're My Sister"	Lawrence Trilling	Jason Katims	January 22, 2013	415	4.87

=== Season 5 (2013–14) ===
No. overall	No. in season	Title	Directed by	Written by	Original release date	Prod. code	US viewers (millions)
69	1	"It Has to Be Now"	Lawrence Trilling	Jason Katims	September 26, 2013	501	5.06
70	2	"All Aboard Who's Coming Aboard"	Lawrence Trilling	David Hudgins	October 3, 2013	502	4.17
71	3	"Nipple Confusion"	Patrick Norris	Sarah Watson	October 10, 2013	503	3.77
72	4	"In Dreams Begin Responsibilities"	Patrick Norris	Gina Fattore	October 17, 2013	504	4.02
73	5	"Let's Be Mad Together"	Dylan K. Massin	Jessica Goldberg	October 24, 2013	505	3.95
74	6	"The M Word"	James Ponsoldt	Julia Brownell	October 31, 2013	506	3.67
75	7	"Speaking of Baggage"	Millicent Shelton	Ian Deitchman & Kristin Rusk Robinson	November 7, 2013	507	3.88
76	8	"The Ring"	Lawrence Trilling	Justin W. Lo	November 14, 2013	508	3.77
77	9	"Election Day"	Lawrence Trilling	Jason Katims	November 21, 2013	509	3.65
78	10	"All That's Left is the Hugging"	Jessica Yu	Sarah Watson	December 12, 2013	510	3.93
79	11	"Promises"	Michael Weaver	David Hudgins	January 2, 2014	511	3.96
80	12	"Stay a Little Longer"	Michael Weaver	Julia Brownell	January 9, 2014	512	4.26
81	13	"Jump Ball"	Ken Whittingham	Jessica Goldberg	January 16, 2014	513	3.98
82	14	"You've Got Mold"	Ken Whittingham	Gina Fattore	January 23, 2014	514	4.26
83	15	"Just Like at Home"	Allison Liddi-Brown	Ian Deitchman & Kristin Rusk Robinson	February 27, 2014	515	3.59
84	16	"The Enchanting Mr. Knight"	Allison Liddi-Brown	Julia Brownell	March 6, 2014	516	3.80
85	17	"Limbo"	Lawrence Trilling	Jessica Goldberg	March 13, 2014	517	3.87
86	18	"The Offer"	Lawrence Trilling	Sarah Watson	March 20, 2014	518	4.22
87	19	"Fraud Alert"	Bethany Rooney	Jason Katims	March 27, 2014	519	4.40
88	20	"Cold Feet"	Michael Weaver	David Hudgins	April 3, 2014	520	3.73
89	21	"I'm Still Here"	Scott Schaeffer	Ian Deitchman & Kristin Rusk Robinson	April 10, 2014	521	3.66
90	22	"The Pontiac"	Lawrence Trilling	Jason Katims	April 17, 2014	522	3.99

=== Season 6 (2014–15) ===
No. overall	No. in season	Title	Directed by	Written by	Original release date	Prod. code	US viewers (millions)
91	1	"Vegas"	Lawrence Trilling	Jason Katims	September 25, 2014	601	4.26
92	2	"Happy Birthday, Zeek"	Lawrence Trilling	Sarah Watson	October 2, 2014	602	4.34
93	3	"The Waiting Room"	Patrick Norris	Jessica Goldberg	October 9, 2014	603	4.25
94	4	"A Potpourri of Freaks"	Peter Krause	Ian Deitchman & Kristin Rusk Robinson	October 16, 2014	604	4.20
95	5	"The Scale of Affection is Fluid"	Bethany Rooney	Jesse Zwick	October 23, 2014	605	3.95
96	6	"Too Big to Fail"	Jessica Yu	Ian Deitchman & Kristin Rusk Robinson	October 30, 2014	606	3.89
97	7	"These Are the Times We Live In"	Eric Galileo Tignini	Sarah Watson	November 6, 2014	607	3.96
98	8	"Aaron Brownstein Must Be Stopped"	Lawrence Trilling	Jessica Goldberg	November 13, 2014	608	3.61
99	9	"Lean In"	Lawrence Trilling	Jesse Zwick	November 20, 2014	609	3.99
100	10	"How Did We Get Here?"	Michael Weaver	Jason Katims	January 8, 2015	610	4.63
101	11	"Let's Go Home"	Allison Liddi-Brown	Sarah Watson	January 15, 2015	611	4.12
102	12	"We Made it Through the Night"	Jason Katims	Jason Katims	January 22, 2015	612	4.40
103	13	"May God Bless and Keep You Always"	Lawrence Trilling	Jason Katims	January 29, 2015	613	5.46
