= I Hear You, I See You =

- Parenthood episode
- The episode received critical praise for the performances of Lauren Graham and Peter Krause, and the writing of their scenes.
- Episode no.: Season 2 Episode 1
- Directed by: Lawrence Trilling
- Written by: Jason Katims
- Original air date: September 14, 2010

Guest appearances
- William Baldwin as Gordon Flint; Minka Kelly as Gaby

Episode chronology
← Previous "Lost and Found"	Next → "No Good Deed"
- Parenthood season 2

"I Hear You, I See You" is the second season premiere of the American comedy-drama television series Parenthood, and the fourteenth overall episode of the series. It originally aired on NBC in the United States on September 14, 2010. In the episode, Sarah feels Adam has stolen one of her ideas, Julia and Joel try to talk to their daughter about sex, and Crosby tries to cope with missing Jasmine and Jabbar.

The episode was written by Jason Katims and directed by Lawrence Trilling, and featured the first of several appearances by William Baldwin as Adam's boss, Gordon Flint. Minka Kelly, who previously appeared in the first season, also returned to her recurring role as Gaby, Max's therapist. "I Hear You, I See You" received generally positive reviews. According to Nielsen Media Research, it was seen by an average 7.69 million viewers, a decline from the first season premiere in March 2010.

== Plot ==
Adam (Peter Krause) is stressed about work because his boss Gordon (William Baldwin) feels he is too distracted by family issues. Sarah (Lauren Graham), frustrated with her children for losing their shoes, off-handedly remarks to Adam about her desire for a LoJack to help locate missing shoes. Put on the spot for new ideas at work, Adam pitches the LoJack idea and Gordon loves it, insisting Adam start developing it. When Sarah learns this later she is excited, but feels upset she is not given credit. When Zeek (Craig T. Nelson) encourages her to stand up for herself, Sarah confronts Adam, but he counters that he has made many sacrifices for Sarah in the past and never asked for anything in return. Later, however, Adam tells Gordon it was Sarah's idea. That night, Adam apologizes to Sarah and offers her an internship at the company's design department, which she happily accepts.

Kristina (Monica Potter) is teaching Haddie (Sarah Ramos) how to drive, but is so over-worried she stresses her daughter out. Haddies tries to convince Adam to teach her instead, but he refuses. Later, during another lesson, Kristina distresses Haddie so much she crashes into a garbage can, damaging a side mirror. The two later argue, but they eventually reconcile, and Kristina explains she dreads the idea of her daughter dying in an accident. Meanwhile, Crosby (Dax Shepard) meets and seems attracted to Gaby (Minka Kelly), the therapist helping Max (Max Burkholder). Crosby is trying to cope with missing his son Jabbar (Tyree Brown) and girlfriend Jasmine (Joy Bryant), who is in New York City pursuing her dancing career. Jabbar plans to visit Crosby, who promises Max the two boys can have a sleepover, much to Max's excitement. However, Jasmine later tells Crosby she cannot visit after all due to an audition. When Crosby tells Max, he grows hysterical due to his Asperger syndrome. He is calmed by Gaby while Crosby watches, realizing the extent of Max's problems. Haddie later has a sleepover with a now-happy Max.

Zeek is in therapy with his wife, Camille (Bonnie Bedelia), and whenever he starts to speak disrespectfully, he stops himself and tells her, "I hear you and I see you." The roof in Zeek's barn is leaking and he tries to fix it, but only makes it worse due to his poor handyman skills. Sarah recruits Joel (Sam Jaeger), a licensed contractor, to help Zeek, but tells him he must let Zeek believe he is doing all the work. Joel tries to help, but Zeek constantly interferes and declares himself in charge. Eventually, Joel loses his temper and yells at Zeek, who is impressed with the usually timid Joel. Meanwhile, Sydney (Savannah Paige Rae) asks her parents if she came "out of a vagina". Joel is uncomfortable discussing sex with her child, but Julia (Erika Christensen) insists on telling her the truth. The topic eventually leads Julia to conclude she wants another child and, in her excitement, she does not notice Joel seems conflicted about the idea.

== Production ==
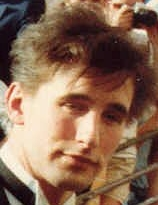
"I Hear You, I See You" marked the first of several appearances by William Baldwin in Parenthood.

"I Hear You, I See You" was directed by Lawrence Trilling and written by Jason Katims, one of the executive directors of Parenthood. It marked the first appearance of William Baldwin, who is set to appear in at least eight episodes in the first half of the second season in his recurring role as Gordon Flint. Trilling said the characters will serve not only as Adam's boss, but also an eventual love interest for Sarah, so they wanted an actor with both stature and comedic talent. Baldwin previously starred in the drama television series Dirty Sexy Money along with Parenthood co-star Peter Krause, and Trilling felt their past experience working together helped Krause and Baldwin develop a quick rapport on Parenthood. "I Hear You, I See You" also included the return of Minka Kelly, who previously appeared in first season episodes as Gaby, Max's therapist.

== Cultural references ==
Crosby and Jasmine communicate long distance via Skype, a software application that allows users to make voice calls and video chat over the Internet. At one point, they attempt to have cybersex using Skype, but are interrupted when the software freezes. In preparing for his sleepover, Max talks excitedly about his Sun Chips, a brand of potato chips by Frito-Lay, and goes so far as to count each chip out individually. Several songs were featured in "I Hear You, I See You", including "Smile" by Evil Twins, "Well Runs Dry" by Peter Case, "Quick Canal" by Atlas Sound, "Older Guys" by The Flying Burrito Brothers, "It Takes a Muscle" by M.I.A. and "Take a Bow" by Greg Laswell.

== Reception ==
In its original American broadcast, "I Hear You, I See You" was seen by an estimated average 7.69 million viewers, according to Nielsen Media Research, with 8.45 million viewers during the first half hour. The second half hour's viewership was 6.93 million, which was considered a major mid-episode drop. It received a 2.7 rating among adults between age 18 and 49, an eight percent viewership drop compared to the first season premiere on March 2, 2010. This was despite a boost Parenthood was expected as a result of debuting after the season finale of NBC's America's Got Talent. The episode received generally positive reviews. Entertainment Weekly television writer Ken Tucker praised Jason Katims' script and felt the episode gave all the actors adequate screen-time while contributing to the overall shape of the series. Tucker particularly praised the new link formed between Sarah and Adam, the infusion of comic relief into Julia and Joel, and Sarah Ramos, who he said gave "the best acting of the night" as Haddie.

Even when the individual storylines are lax (and none of them really grabbed me tonight), the sweet spot for "Parenthood" is in showing the messy intersections of those stories, both within the individual family units and as they cross. Tonight, Max provided a strong intersection point.

— Alan Sepinwall, HitFix

Mandi Bierly, also of Entertainment Weekly, also praised the premiere and drew particular attention to the scene with Sarah confronting Adam about stealing her idea. She said the scene shows the writers and actors "are not people afraid of letting an awkward, tension-filled scene breathe", and that kind of realism illustrates the strength of the show's writing and acting. Camille Wright Felton of CNN said she loved the show, and particularly praised the subplot about Haddie learning to drive, as well as Adam's response when Haddie asked if whether he and his wife had an agreement to ignore each other's flaws: "Yeah, it's called marriage." However, Felton criticized Baldwin's character, which she described as a "single-minded boss who apparently exists as an island and doesn't get that people have families and need to tend to family crises". HitFix television columnist Alan Sepinwall felt the first half of the episode was too uneven in its mix of comedy and drama, but that it was later redeemed mainly by the scenes featuring Max, who he said "is the one character on the show who never feels inauthentic, and he kind of pulls everyone toward him". Sepinwall praised the performance of Max Burkholder as Max, but described William Baldwin's character as a "caricatured playboy boss".

Emily VanDerWerff, of The A.V. Club, also felt the first half was "a little too giggly and chaotic [with] every plotline devolving into the most obvious comedy possible", and felt Baldwin's boss character was too stereotypical. But she praised several later scenes, like the fight between Joel and Zeek, Crosby's reaction to max's tantrum, and Joel's ambivalence about having another child. Not all reviews of "I Hear You, I See You" were positive. Movieline writer Julie Miller felt most of the episode's subplots were unoriginal and uninteresting, including Sydney's inquiries about where babies come from and Zeek making the roof worse by trying to repair it. Miller sarcastically wrote, "The show proved that it is not screwing around in its sophomore year by immediately tackling completely original family issues."
