= Caught Up (Usher song) =

2005 single by Usher

Single by Usher

from the album Confessions
- Released: January 3, 2005
- Genre: Dance-pop; R&B
- Length: 3:44
- Label: Arista
- Songwriters: Ryan Toby; Andre Harris; Vidal Davis; Jason "Poo Bear" Boyd
- Producer: Dre & Vidal

Usher singles chronology
"Lovers and Friends" (2004)	"Caught Up" (2005)	"Same Girl" (2007)

Music video
- "Caught Up" on YouTube

"Caught Up" is a song by American singer Usher. It was written by Andre Harris, Vidal Davis, Ryan Toby, and Jason "Poo Bear" Boyd for Usher's 2004 album, Confessions, with production helmed by Harris and Davis under their production moniker Dre & Vidal. The song was released as the fifth (fourth in the United Kingdom and Ireland) and final single from the album on January 3, 2005.

Critics hailed "Caught Up" as a tight, thunderous standout that highlights Usher's rhythmic vocals and confident performance. It peaked at number eight in the United States, number nine in the United Kingdom, and reached the top 20 in Australia, Finland, Ireland, the Netherlands, and New Zealand. The "Caught Up" music video, part of Rhythm City Volume One: Caught Up (2004), stars Usher in a mini-musical blending drama and performances, and premiered on Fox's New Year's Eve Live.

== Background and release ==
Although Usher "didn't look too far" when starting working on his fourth studio album Confessions and decided to "continue building" with previous producers, he branched out with several musical collaborators. Usher enlisted Philadelphia producers Andre "Dre" Harris and Vidal Davis of Dre & Vidal, along with other musical collaborators. During the sessions, after recording the downtempo song "Superstar," Usher asked them to create a "real up-tempo beat". When they worked on the track, they partied the whole time which Dre considered a "partly record". He recalled, "We had some women, some drinks, some music."

They went to club to take a break, and played the song in Usher's truck while on the way. Initially, Usher was hesitant to record the song after hearing the reference track and was unsure whether it suited him, particularly because he believed the lyrics did not reflect how people in his hometown of Atlanta would speak. However, his opinion changed once he entered the studio and heard his own vocals over the production, and he was further encouraged by the positive response the song received from others.

A strong contender for the album's lead single, but ultimately replaced by "Yeah!", "Caught Up" was released as the fifth and final single from Confessions. The song impacted US rhythmic contemporary and urban radio on January 3, 2005, and it was added to contemporary hit radio on January 11, 2005, alongside a remix featuring rapper Fabolous. It was also released in the Netherlands and the United Kingdom on February 21, 2005, and on March 8 in Germany. The Germany release contains the album version of the song, three of its remixes and the single's music video.

== Reception ==
"Caught Up"
The song was produced by Dre & Vidal, who also wrote the song.

"Caught Up" received positive reviews from music critics. Andrew McGregor of BBC called the song "meaty" and "hip-grinding". Jon Caramanica of Blender magazine referred to the song like a "Southern marching band performing late-'80s R&B". He characterized Usher's voice playing like a rhythm instruments. Sal Cinquemani of Slant Magazine complimented Dre and Vidal for producing an old-sounding music without sampling records, calling it "super-tight" alongside "Follow Me", another song from the album. Andy Kellman of Allmusic complimented the song as one of Usher's best moments in the album, together with "Burn". Kelefa Sanneh of The New York Times called it a "thunderous song" from the album, adding that it gave Usher "a chance to do two of the things he does best: strut and pander".

== Commercial performance ==
"Caught Up" did not live up to the chart-topping performances of Confessions' previous four releases. In the United States, the single debuted on the Billboard Hot 100 at number 76. It peaked at number eight for two non-consecutive weeks, 15 weeks after its release. "Caught Up" was the only single from the album that failed to reach number one, though it remained on the Hot 100 for a notable 27 weeks. Two decades after its release, on February 9, 2024, the song was certified both Gold and Platinum by the Recording Industry Association of America (RIAA).

Outside the United States, responses from music markets were relatively similar. "Caught Up" debuted and peaked at number nine on the UK Singles Chart, remaining on the chart for also nine weeks, and reached Gold status in the United Kingdom on September 11, 2026. The song also reached number 10 in the Netherlands and under top ten on the rest of European countries; much lesser in Finland where it only stayed for one week compared to other charts, remaining for several weeks. In Australia and New Zealand, where it was later certified Platinum, the single reached numbers 15 and 12, respectively. On September 9, 2024, "Caught Up" also earned Usher a Gold certification from Music Canada.

== Music video ==
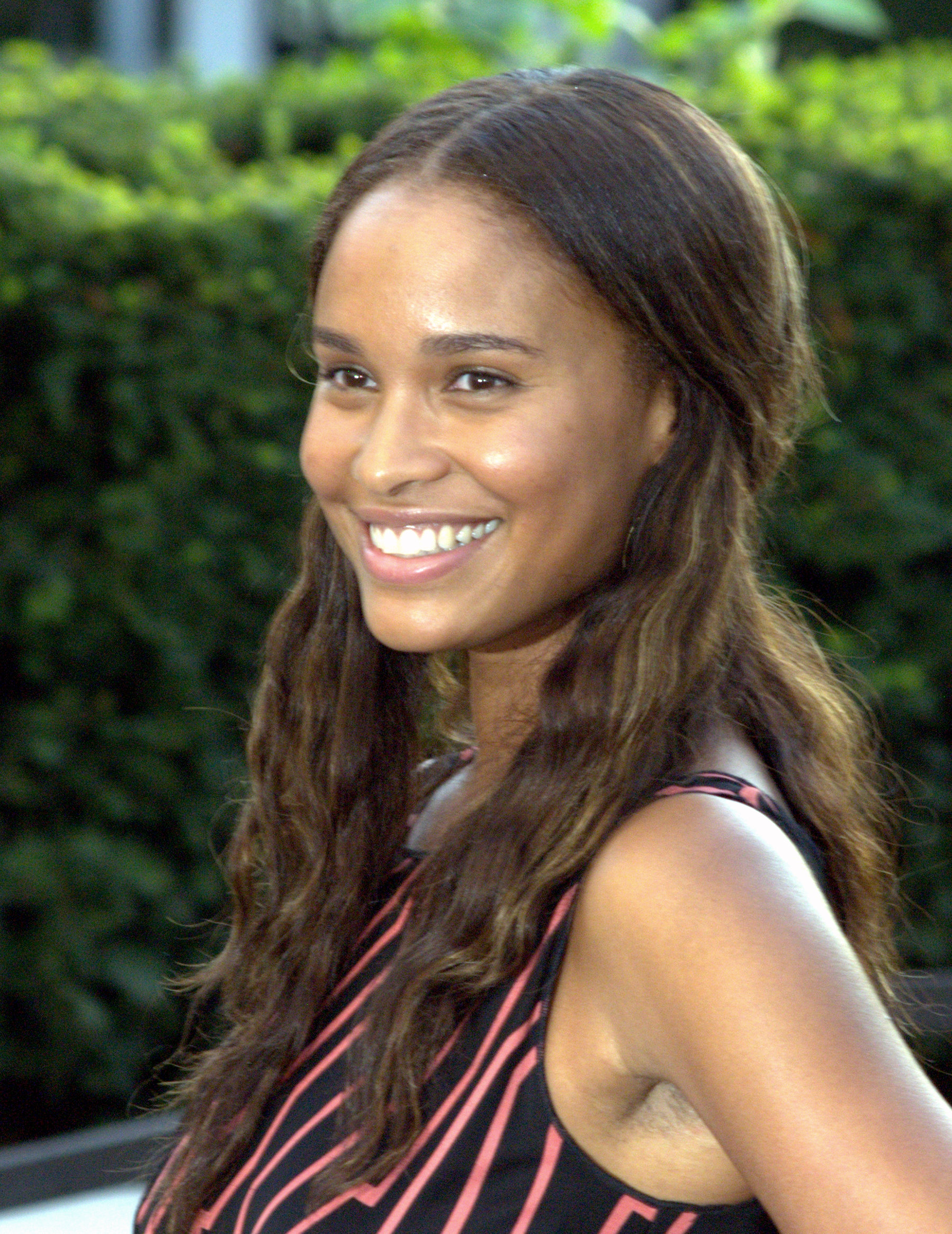
Joy Bryant co-stars as Usher's love interest in "Caught Up".

An excerpt from Rhythm City Volume One: Caught Up (2004) serves as the music video for "Caught Up." Usher reteamed with Mr. X, who was behind the laser light treatment of Usher's 2004 video "Yeah!," to produce and direct the 20-minute mini-musical film starring himself as a successful club owner and DJ who gets entangled in a romantic love triangle, interwoven with performances of songs from his Confessions album and featuring celebrity cameos from Joy Bryant, Ryan Seacrest, Naomi Campbell, Clifton Powell and Sean Combs, blending drama and music into a narrative format. Produced by Ush Entertainment, the project was shot during a 5-day shoot in Los Angeles, beginning December 2, 2004, at a cost of $2.2 million.

The "Caught Up" segment of the film shows Usher and friends riding a car while heading to his live performance. On the way, they fist fight after Usher saves a woman (Bryant) from an antagonist, played by Clifton Powell. Realizing he needs to perform, Usher rushes to the venue, where the segment concludes with him performing the song before a large crowd. The visuals premiered as part of the debut broadcast of Rhythm City Volume One: Caught Up during Fox's annual New Year's Eve programming New Year's Eve Live from Times Square with Ryan Seacrest on December 31, 2004. "Caught Up" later debuted on MTV's Total Request Live on January 10, 2005, at number 10, remaining on the countdown for thirty-four days. As of May 2024, the video has received over 40 million views on YouTube.

== Track listing ==
German CD single
No.	Title	Writer(s)	Producer(s)	Length
1.	"Caught Up" (album version)	Ryan Toby; Andre Harris; Vidal Davis; Jason "Poo Bear" Boyd	Dre & Vidal	3:48
2.	"Caught Up" (remix) (featuring Fabolous)	Toby; Harris; Davis; Boyd; John Jackson	Dre & Vidal	4:39
3.	"Caught Up" (Bimbo Jones remix)	Toby; Harris; Davis; Boyd	Dre & Vidal; Lee Dagger^{[a]}; Marc JB^{[a]}	3:33
4.	"Caught Up" (Delinquent "Whistle Crew" re-fix)	Toby; Harris; Davis; Boyd	Dre & Vidal; Mike Panteli^{[a]}; Philip Omo^{[a]}	7:56
5.	"Caught Up" (music video)			3:49

== Credits and personnel ==
Credits lifted from the liner notes of Confessions.

- Jason "Poo Bear" Boyd – vocal producer, writer
- Vidal Davis – mixing, producer, writer
- Vince DiLorenzo – recording engineer
- Andre Harris – mixing, producer, writer
- Herb Powers, Jr. – mastering
- Usher Raymond – vocals
- Jon Smeltz – mixing
- Ryan Toby – vocal producer, writer

== Charts ==
=== Weekly charts ===
Weekly chart performance for "Caught Up"
Chart (2005)	Peak position
Australia (ARIA)	15
Australian Urban (ARIA)	5
Austria (Ö3 Austria Top 40)	48
Belgium (Ultratop 50 Flanders)	23
Belgium (Ultratop 50 Wallonia)	26
Canada CHR/Pop Top 30 (Radio & Records)	1
Czech Republic Airplay (ČNS IFPI)	90
Finland (Suomen virallinen lista)	14
Germany (GfK)	26
Ireland (IRMA)	17
Netherlands (Dutch Top 40)	10
Netherlands (Single Top 100)	12
New Zealand (Recorded Music NZ)	12
Scottish Singles Sales (Official Charts)	16
Switzerland (Schweizer Hitparade)	22
UK Singles (Official Charts)	9
UK Hip Hop/R&B (Official Charts)	6
US Billboard Hot 100	8
US Hot R&B/Hip-Hop Songs (Billboard)	13
US Pop Airplay (Billboard)	2
US Rhythmic Airplay (Billboard)	9

=== Year-end charts ===
Year-end chart performance for "Caught Up"
Chart (2005)	Position
Australia (ARIA)	92
Netherlands (Dutch Top 40)	98
Romania (Romanian Top 100)	25
UK Singles (OCC)	145
UK Urban (Music Week)	17
US Billboard Hot 100	34
US Hot R&B/Hip-Hop Songs (Billboard)	58
US Mainstream Top 40 (Billboard)	16
US Rhythmic Top 40 (Billboard)	45

== Certifications ==
Certifications and sales for "Caught Up"
Region	Certification	Certified units/sales
Australia (ARIA)	Platinum	70,000^{‡}
Canada (Music Canada)	Gold	40,000^{‡}
New Zealand (RMNZ)	Platinum	30,000^{‡}
United Kingdom (BPI)	Gold	400,000^{‡}
United States (RIAA)	Platinum	1,000,000^{‡}
^{‡} Sales+streaming figures based on certification alone.

== Release history ==
Release dates and formats for "Caught Up"
Region	Date	Format	Label(s)	Ref.
United States	January 11, 2005	Mainstream airplay	LaFace; Zomba	
