= Parenthood season 2 =

Parenthood
- Season 2
- DVD cover
- No. of episodes: 22

Release
- Original network: NBC
- Original release: September 14, 2010 – April 19, 2011

Season chronology
- ← Previous; Season 1 Next → Season 3

The second season of the NBC comedy-drama series Parenthood premiered on September 14, 2010 and ended on April 19, 2011, it consisted of 22 episodes.

== Cast ==
=== Main cast ===
- Peter Krause as Adam Braverman
- Lauren Graham as Sarah Braverman
- Dax Shepard as Crosby Braverman
- Monica Potter as Kristina Braverman
- Erika Christensen as Julia Braverman-Graham
- Sam Jaeger as Joel Graham
- Savannah Paige Rae as Sydney Graham (21 episodes)
- Sarah Ramos as Haddie Braverman (21 episodes)
- Max Burkholder as Max Braverman (21 episodes)
- Joy Bryant as Jasmine Trussell (21 episodes)
- Tyree Brown as Jabbar Trussell (16 episodes)
- Miles Heizer as Drew Holt (17 episodes)
- Mae Whitman as Amber Holt (21 episodes)
- Bonnie Bedelia as Camille Braverman (19 episodes)
- Craig T. Nelson as Zeek Braverman

=== Recurring cast ===
- Minka Kelly as Gaby
- Phil Abrams as Phil Lessing
- Amanda Foreman as Suze Lessing
- Tina Lifford as Renee Trussell
- Michael B. Jordan as Alex
- John Corbett as Seth Holt
- William Baldwin as Gordon Flint
- Anthony Carrigan as Cory Smith
- Scott Michael Foster as Gary
- Richard Dreyfuss as Gilliam T. Blount
- Zosia Mamet as Kelsey
- Kevin Alejandro as Mike (aka "Forklift Mike")

== Production ==
In April 2010, Parenthood was renewed for a second season by NBC. The second season premiered September 14, 2010. Later that year in November, it was announced that Parenthood would be moving to Mondays at 10:00 pm beginning March 7. However, due to an overhaul of NBC's Law & Order: Los Angeles putting the show on an indefinite hiatus, the network announced in January 2011, that Parenthood would remain in the Tuesday 10:00 pm time slot.

== Episodes ==
No. overall	No. in season	Title	Directed by	Written by	Original release date	Prod. code	US viewers (millions)
14	1	"I Hear You, I See You"	Lawrence Trilling	Jason Katims	September 14, 2010	201	7.60
Adam is stressed at work because of his boss Gordon, who feels he is too distracted by family issues. When Sarah off-handedly remarks to Adam about her desire for a LoJack to help locate missing shoes, Adam pitches the idea to Gordon, who insists Adam start developing it. Because Sarah came up with the idea, Adam offers her an internship at the company's design department. Zeek, thinking he can fix anything, tries to repair a leak in the guest house; the family gets Joel to help. Kristina tries to teach Haddie how to drive. Crosby is trying to cope without Jabbar and Jasmine, who are living in New York so Jasmine can pursue her dance career. When Sydney begins to have questions about how babies are born, Julia and Joel debate giving her "the talk." The topic eventually leads Julia to conclude she wants another child; in her excitement, she does not notice that Joel seems conflicted about the idea.
15	2	"No Good Deed"	Lawrence Trilling	Tyler Bensinger	September 21, 2010	202	5.85
Adam is concerned that Sarah will not respect his authority at work and, suspicious about her close bond with Gordon, tells Sarah to stop spending so much time with Gordon. After Sarah threatens to quit, Adam apologizes, but reiterates that there must be boundaries between home and work. Julia commits to a playdate for Sydney that threatens her other friendships. Kristina helps her friend Suze, who is facing a divorce, by babysitting her autistic son Noel; Kristina fears that her marriage with Adam could experience similar problems because of Max. Crosby reunites with Jasmine and Jabbar, but Jasmine reveals that she has been chosen to join a European tour company. Crosby initially wants Jabbar to stay on his houseboat while Jasmine is away, but when Jasmine's mother Renee disapproves of Crosby's accommodations, he is convinced to let Jabbar live with Renee.
16	3	"I'm Cooler Than You Think"	Michael Waxman	Bridget Carpenter	September 28, 2010	203	4.83
Amber is spending a lot of time with her new friend Kelsey. In an attempt to spend more time with her daughter, Sarah tries to find a band for her, Amber and Kelsey to see; Sarah's coworker Mike gives her a suggestion. Julia tells Adam that she and Joel are trying for a baby. After being congratulated by Adam, Joel confronts Julia, as they had not discussed the idea of a second child thoroughly. Kristina tries to help Haddie with her class president campaign, but Haddie believes she is being too controlling. Crosby struggles with Jabbar's living assignment, and he confronts Renee for acting coldly towards him. Adam struggles with his relationship with Max, and is frustrated with the progress Max is making with Gaby. Adam and Max end up bonding when Adam recounts his days as treasurer in high school.
17	4	"Date Night"	Adam Bernstein	David Hudgins	October 5, 2010	204	5.16
Kristina, troubled by divorce rate statistics of parents of autistic children, schedules a date night with Adam to help their marriage. Sarah and Mike go on a date and run into Adam and Kristina. Sarah offers unwanted love advice to Drew when he studies with his lab partner Holly. When Holly rejects Drew's advances, Drew angrily tells Sarah that he wants advice from his father. As Haddie continues her run for junior class president, she decides to enlist Kristina's help with her campaign. Haddie ends up winning the position. As Hobby Day begins at Sydney's school, Joel struggles to find a hobby to show the kids at school. Crosby gets drunk at a party, but receives a call from Renee to pick up Jabbar from a field trip. Crosby calls Gaby to help pick up Jabbar, and Jasmine's brother lambasts Crosby for his behavior. Jasmine quits her job and returns to Berkeley.
18	5	"The Booth Job"	Adam Davidson	Kerry Ehrin	October 12, 2010	205	4.66
Kristina goes to an Asperger's support group alone and feels connected with the other parents over shared experiences; she later convinces Adam to join her for the second meeting. In an attempt to get Jabbar accepted at Sydney's school, Crosby and Jasmine pretend to be a married couple for an interview with the principal. Amber confronts Kelsey for wasting their SAT tutoring sessions to smoke weed. Zeek and Camille sign up for ballroom dancing classes with hopes of connecting on a deeper level. Joel and Julia have a discussion about their relationship when Sydney wants to sleep in their bed; Joel feels he does not get enough alone time with Julia, while Julia feels she does not get to spend enough time with their daughter. Sarah's performance at the shoe booth exceeds Gordon's expectations, causing him to unexpectedly kiss her after the event.
19	6	"Orange Alert"	Adam Davidson	Sarah Watson	October 19, 2010	206	4.87
Zeek once again tries to go overboard with the Halloween celebration and is upset when Haddie, Amber and Sarah refuse to join in the fun; Zeek later reveals that Halloween was the last holiday he celebrated with Camille before serving in the Army. Adam and Kristina are nervous about Max's desire to go trick-or-treating, due to his fear of fire and large crowds. Julia struggles with her belief in women's rights when Sydney wants to dress up as a beauty queen. Sarah's relationship with Gordon gets complicated after she confronts him about their kiss. Amber and Kelsey go to a frat party; Gordon later helps Sarah and Amber when Kelsey gets drunk, after which an impressed Sarah agrees to date Gordon. Crosby and Jasmine go house-hunting while Jabbar begins classes at his new school. After taking Jabbar trick-or-treating, Crosby proposes to Jasmine.
20	7	"Seven Names"	Jan Eliasberg	Eric Guggenheim	October 26, 2010	207	4.94
In the midst of a financial crisis, Gordon orders Adam to fire seven people from the company, leading him to seek advice from Kristina and Haddie. Jasmine accepts Crosby's proposal and they announce their future plans to Jabbar, who reacts indifferently to the news. Julia and Joel fight when he takes a week-long remodelling job, which interferes with his parenting duties and Julia's work schedule. Haddie joins Camille for community service but does not get along with the volunteer coordinator, Alex. Despite Amber's objections, Sarah informs Kelsey's mother about the incident at the frat party. Kelsey's mother believes Amber is the bad influence and forbids the two friends from seeing each other, devastating Amber. Sarah experiences deeper issues with Gordon when he invites her on an impromptu vacation to Los Angeles, which she declines.
21	8	"If This Boat is a Rockin'"	Allison Liddi-Brown	Tyler Bensinger	November 9, 2010	208	4.99
While going grocery shopping, Adam abruptly punches a man who calls Max a retard. After being confronted by Zeek, Adam confesses that he has trouble managing his stress, and that he always felt the need to stay in control since he was a child. Sarah's LoJack idea performs poorly with a test group. To cheer up Sarah, Gordon rents a limo and invites her to spend a romantic evening together. The two spend the night, much to the dismay of Drew and Amber. Haddie develops a crush on Alex and kisses him; he rebuffs her, stating that he cannot pursue a romantic relationship because he wants to focus on his sobriety. Crosby and Jasmine delve into domestic discussions, beginning with the selling of Crosby's houseboat; the Braverman siblings reflect on their memories of the houseboat as Crosby reluctantly decides to put it up for sale.
22	9	"Put Yourself Out There"	Patrick Norris	Bridget Carpenter	November 16, 2010	209	4.81
Zeek becomes jealous when he discovers that Matthew is the new teacher of Camille's art class, and he advises Camille to quit the class during couples therapy. Zeek ends up tracking down Matthew and confronts him, angering Camille. Amber gets a high score on her SATs; Sarah tries to convince Amber to meet with Gordon's colleague Carly, who attended college in Berkeley. Amber is resistant to the idea, but agrees to the interview after a pep talk from Adam. Max does not get invited to his friend's birthday party, leading Kristina to confront the friend's mother. Joel is directing the school play; the principal is unsatisfied with Joel's work and convinces Crosby to become the assistant director. However, Joel dislikes Crosby's contributions to the play and quits. Haddie and Alex continue to grow closer as friends, although Haddie confesses to Camille that she has a crush on Alex.
23	10	"Happy Thanksgiving"	Bob Berlinger	David Hudgins	November 23, 2010	210	4.47
Adam fears for his future and is torn between his job and family after Gordon reveals that he is selling the company. While preparing for Thanksgiving, Camille and Amber bond. Drew and Adam do not like that Sarah has invited Gordon for Thanksgiving dinner; Zeek realizes that Drew is upset about his father's absence, leading him to contact Sarah's ex-husband Seth. Crosby tries to impress Renee by inviting her to dinner. Julia tries to make pies for the dinner while dealing with Sydney's temperamental behavior. During the dinner, Julia snaps at Sydney, Adam and Crosby mock Gordon, and Drew receives a call from Seth. Tensions between Adam and Gordon come to a head at the post-dinner football game when Adam reveals that Gordon sold the company. Sarah and Gordon break up. Haddie leaves dinner early to help at the food bank; Kristina finds her kissing Alex when she goes to drive her home.
24	11	"Damage Control"	Lawrence Trilling	Kerry Ehrin	January 4, 2011	211	5.98
As Haddie and Alex's relationship progresses, Adam wants to meet Alex and invites him to the Braverman house for dinner, much to Haddie's dismay. Over dinner, Alex discusses his childhood and struggles with alcoholism. Adam and Kristina are touched by Alex's story, but forbid Haddie from dating him, as they believe he is too mature for her age. Julia and Joel have differing opinions over how to explain death to Sydney when a bird hits their window. Crosby deals with walking the line between being a friend to Jabbar and being a parent when Jabbar refuses to clean his room. When Sarah finds out that Drew's bonding with Zeek included a beer, she is faced with the guilt of having children with an alcoholic and addict. Worried about the influence that Seth's addiction has had on her kids, Sarah confesses the extent of Seth's alcoholism to Drew and Amber.
25	12	"Meet the New Boss"	Lawrence Trilling	Sarah Watson	January 11, 2011	212	5.58
Adam meets the new boss, Cory Smith, who has a young and energetic personality. Adam worries about the future of the company and tries to search for new jobs. Crosby tries to direct the school play but struggles to take charge of the kids. Under Julia's advice, Crosby apologizes to Joel, who agrees to return as co-director. Amber takes on the challenge of performing at an open mic night, much to the excitement of Sarah. Kristina tries to resolve things with Haddie, who is still angry with her. Unbeknownst to Adam and Kristina, Haddie continues to keep contact with Alex, who wants to take her out for their first real date. Haddie seeks advice from Amber, who also expresses concerns about Alex's battle with alcoholism.
26	13	"Opening Night"	Ken Whittingham	Monica Henderson	January 18, 2011	213	5.58
As the school play approaches, Jabbar struggles with stage fright and refuses to participate in the play. Crosby butts heads with Jasmine over how to resolve the issue; Crosby wants to help Jabbar overcome his fear, while Jasmine does not want to pressure Jabbar. Crosby stands his ground and convinces Jabbar to change his mind. Sarah is forced to help Drew sell holiday wrapping paper for his baseball fundraiser. Failing to reach the $500 goal, Zeek anonymously purchases the remainder of the paper so Drew is eligible for the baseball tournament. Adam and Kristina discover that Haddie is still dating Alex when he shows up at the Braverman house. They punish Haddie for lying, forbidding her from seeing Alex and removing her bedroom door, while Alex shows up at Adam's office to apologize. Angry with her parents, Haddie decides to move in with her grandparents.
27	14	"A House Divided"	Ken Whittingham	Tyler Bensinger	February 1, 2011	214	6.18
Julia throws a bachelorette party for Jasmine welcoming her to the Braverman tribe. During a meeting with Cory, Adam inadvertently ingests medicinal marijuana. Upon discovering that Adam is stoned, Crosby and Joel take Adam to crash Julia's party. Sarah puts her foot down at work and demands a higher salary to save up for Amber's college tuition. When Cory denies her request, Sarah quits her job and resumes bartending. Zeek takes Max on a camping trip, but ignores Adam and Kristina's instructions. When Max has a meltdown, an overwhelmed Zeek is forced to call Adam to calm Max down. Kristina is stressed over how to deal with Haddie. Haddie apologizes to Adam and Kristina for her behavior, but announces that she will remain at her grandparents' house unless they accept her relationship with Alex.
28	15	"Just Go Home"	Lawrence Trilling	Bridget Carpenter	February 8, 2011	215	5.22
Haddie, Amber and Max go to a park to play basketball with Alex, without telling Adam or Kristina about it. Camille advises Haddie to return home; Haddie does so, and she and her parents come to a mutual agreement over when she can see Alex. Seth is in town to play concerts with his band; he reveals to Sarah that he is nine months sober, and that he wants to be more involved in Drew and Amber's lives. Drew, after discussing it with Sarah, is allowed to go to one of the concerts his father is playing at. Amber puts aside her differences with their father and also attends the concert. Crosby begins to feel more and more silenced when it comes to his relationship with Jasmine, and he feels that she is too controlling. When he voices his concerns, Crosby and Jasmine get into a nasty argument about the future of their relationship that culminates in Crosby storming out.
29	16	"Amazing Andy and His Wonderful World of Bugs"	Lawrence Trilling	Kerry Ehrin	February 15, 2011	216	5.12
Drew's relationship with his father continues to grow, although Amber remains wary of Seth. While waiting at a batting cage, Drew witnesses Seth physically threatening a group of men. Impressed by his father, Drew punches a bully at school and gets sent to the principal's office. Julia and Joel continue trying for a baby, although Joel struggles to adjust to Julia's ovulation schedule. While planning a birthday party for Max, Kristina and Adam hire a performer named Amazing Andy, who runs a birthday party business about bugs. Adam and Kristina are initially put off by Andy's odd behavior, but grow more fondly towards him when they learn that he has Asperger's. Following their argument, Jasmine and Crosby are still on bad terms. When Max lashes out at Gaby, Crosby takes her to a bar to cheer her up; the two bond over drinks and reflect on their own personal conflicts. After Max's birthday party, Crosby and Gaby have sex.
30	17	"Do Not Sleep With Your Autistic Nephew's Therapist"	Jason Katims	Jason Katims	February 22, 2011	217	5.53
After having sex with Gaby, Crosby feels guilty for betraying Jasmine, while Gaby abruptly quits her job as Max's aide, shocking Adam and Kristina. Crosby ultimately confesses his infidelity to Jasmine, who angrily rebukes Crosby and storms out. Zeek and Camille grow closer while babysitting Sydney. Seth tries to reconcile with Amber by giving her a guitar. Amber refuses the gift and tearfully confronts Seth for being an absent father. Seth later informs Sarah that he is leaving town to go back on tour; Sarah insists that he tell Drew and Amber in-person. Under Sarah's instructions, Seth says goodbye to Drew and Amber the following morning, and he also apologizes to Amber for his wrongdoings. Kristina tries to convince Gaby to return as Max's aide, but Gaby reveals that she slept with Crosby. Kristina informs Adam, who angrily confronts Crosby for his indiscretion. Max overhears their argument and learns that he has Asperger's.
31	18	"Qualities and Difficulties"	Bob Berlinger	Bridget Carpenter	March 1, 2011	218	5.03
Adam and Kristina try to talk to Max about his Asperger's, who seems distressed to learn that he is the only family member who has Asperger's. Adam and Kristina later meet with Dr. Pelikan, who suggests a "redo" with Max and creates a carefully worded script that highlights the qualities and difficulties of Asperger's syndrome. Meanwhile, Jasmine refuses to communicate with Crosby, who gets arrested after getting into a drunken fight with a neighbor. Crosby breaks down when Zeek bails him out. Julia and Joel plan to celebrate their eighth year anniversary, but change their plans to comfort Jasmine. Sarah begins writing a story about Seth and turns to Mark for advice. Impressed by Sarah's writing, Mark encourages her to finish the story and tells her that the material would work better as a play.
32	19	"Taking the Leap"	Andrew Bernstein	David Hudgins	March 29, 2011	219	4.89
Adam and Kristina have a surprise meeting with the principal of Footpath, who reveals that Max is flourishing in his classes and encourages Adam and Kristina to transfer Max into mainstream education. Kristina is resistant to the idea, but relents after running into an apologetic Gaby, who encourages them to mainstream Max. While working as an intern at Julia's law firm, Amber learns that she has been rejected from both colleges she applied to. Distraught by the news, Amber gets high with Gary, a fellow parking valet. Zeek introduces Sarah to Gilliam T. Blount, a Broadway producer whom he served with in the Vietnam War; Gilliam agrees to revise Sarah's script. Crosby tries to reconcile with Jasmine through Jabbar's poster board, but she refuses to forgive him for the infidelity. Julia is having trouble getting pregnant, and she and Joel get tested. Julia later discovers that she is unlikely to get pregnant due to intrauterine scarring.
33	20	"New Plan"	Michael Weaver	Jamie Duneier	April 5, 2011	220	4.76
Haddie asks Alex out to her prom night, which he accepts. Adam is stressed that Haddie and Alex will have sex on prom night, but Kristina believes that they should trust Haddie. On prom night, Haddie goes with Alex to his apartment and the two have sex. Sarah grows worried about Amber when she discovers from Julia that Amber did not get accepted at any colleges. Upon learning that Kelsey got accepted into Yale, Amber lashes out at Sarah; Amber's blow-up encourages Sarah to continue working on her stage play. After discovering that she cannot get pregnant, Julia seeks comfort from Camille and tries to spend more time with Sydney. In an attempt to win back Jasmine, Crosby buys a house and admits to selling the houseboat, shocking his siblings. Crosby and Adam reconcile.
34	21	"Slipping Away"	Lawrence Trilling	Kerry Ehrin	April 12, 2011	221	5.22
Crosby asks Joel to help him remodel Jasmine's dream house; Julia tells Crosby that although Jasmine loves him, Jasmine will never forgive him for the affair. Adam and Kristina get an accidental phone call from Haddie while she is having sex with Alex. Kristina asks an enraged Adam to talk to Haddie, but he refuses. Sarah gets her stage-play read by artistic director Mr. Kraft, who gives the last open slot to her. Amber quits her internship and is caught taking illegal drugs by Sarah. Sarah and Drew try to stop Amber, but she gets into a violent fight with her mother and rides off with Gary. To resolve the situation between Adam and Haddie, Sarah explains what she did wrong with Amber: she ignored her when she pushed away while being in a state of depression. At the end of the episode, Gary drives Amber while they are both intoxicated; he runs a red light and they are suddenly sideswiped by an SUV on Amber's side, tossing them violently within the vehicle.
35	22	"Hard Times Come Again No More"	Lawrence Trilling	Jason Katims	April 19, 2011	222	6.32
Sarah and the rest of the Braverman family worry about Amber's well-being after the accident. Adam is upset with Max’s behavior at the hospital and tries to teach him about empathy. Kristina helps with Haddie's transition into womanhood. Julia helps assist Sydney's former teacher when she goes into labor. Impacted by the event, Julia tells Joel that she wants to adopt a baby. Crosby tries to convince Jasmine to visit his new property, but ultimately states he will not pursue her anymore; Jasmine later visits the house. Adam is terminated from his job by Cory. Zeek angrily lectures Amber for her bad decisions, leading her to ask Drew for his forgiveness. Max apologizes to Sarah before her play begins; the play gets Amber's attention, and she tearfully apologizes to Sarah. Adam is angry when he finds a positive pregnancy test in the trash. He initially believes that Haddie is pregnant, but is overjoyed to discover that the test actually belongs to Kristina.

== Ratings ==
=== U.S. Live Ratings ===
#	Episode	Air Date	Rating	Share	18-49 (Rating/Share)	Viewers (m)
1	"I Hear You, I See You"	September 14, 2010	TBA	TBA	2.7/8	7.60
2	"No Good Deed"	September 21, 2010	TBA	TBA	2.5/7	5.85
3	"I'm Cooler Than You Think"	September 28, 2010	3.3	6	2.0/6	4.83
4	"Date Night"	October 5, 2010	3.3	6	2.1/6	5.16
5	"The Booth Job"	October 12, 2010	3.1	5	2.0/5	4.66
6	"Orange Alert"	October 19, 2010	3.2	5	1.9/5	4.87
7	"Seven Names"	October 26, 2010	3.2	5	2.0/6	4.94
8	"If This Boat is a Rockin'"	November 9, 2010	3.2	6	2.1/6	4.99
9	"Put Yourself Out There"	November 16, 2010	3.1	5	1.8/5	4.81
10	"Happy Thanksgiving"	November 23, 2010	2.8	5	1.9/5	4.47
11	"Damage Control"	January 4, 2011	TBA	TBA	2.3/6	5.98
12	"Meet the New Boss"	January 11, 2011	TBA	TBA	2.2/6	5.59
13	"Opening Night"	January 18, 2011	TBA	TBA	2.1/6	5.58
14	"A House Divided"	February 1, 2011	3.7	6	2.2/6	6.18
15	"Just Go Home"	February 8, 2011	3.4	6	1.9/6	5.22
16	"Amazing Andy and His Wonderful World of Bugs"	February 15, 2011	3.4	6	1.9/6	5.12
17	"Do Not Sleep With Your Autistic Nephew's Therapist"	February 22, 2011	3.6	6	2.1/6	5.53
18	"Qualities and Difficulties"	March 1, 2011	3.2	6	1.9/6	5.03
19	"Taking the Leap"	March 29, 2011	3.1	5	1.9/5	4.89
20	"New Plan"	April 5, 2011	3.1	5	1.9/5	4.76
21	"Slipping Away"	April 12, 2011	TBA	TBA	2.1/6	5.22
22	"Hard Times Come Again No More"	April 19, 2011	4.1	7	2.5/7	6.32
