= No Good Deed (Parenthood) =

- Parenthood episode
- Jasmine says goodbye to Jabbar at the airport while Crosby and Renee look on.
- Episode no.: Season 2 Episode 2
- Directed by: Lawrence Trilling
- Written by: Tyler Bensinger
- Original air date: September 21, 2010

Guest appearances
- Phil Abrams as Phil Lessing; Jasmine Alveran as Amy; William Baldwin as Gordon Flint; Elena Evangelo as Cynthia; Amanda Foreman as Suze Lessing; Nicholas Lobue as Noel Lessing; Tina Lifford as Renee Trussell; Mousa Kraish as Eddie

Episode chronology
← Previous "I Hear You, I See You"	Next → "I'm Cooler Than You Think"
- Parenthood season 2

"No Good Deed" is the second episode of the second season of the American comedy-drama television series Parenthood, and the fifteenth overall episode of the series. It originally aired on NBC in the United States on September 21, 2010. In the episode, Sarah and Adam have problems working together, Julia has trouble with social complexities of her six-year-old daughter's relationships, and Crosby and Jasmine fight over where Jabbar should stay with him while Jasmine is abroad.

The episode was written by Tyler Bensinger and directed by Lawrence Trilling.

== Plot ==
Adam (Peter Krause) is concerned that Sarah (Lauren Graham), who has just started an internship at Adam's office, will not respect his authority at work and could cause problems with his boss Gordon (William Baldwin). Adam and Sarah try carpooling to work together, but they only end up annoying each other. Gordon, however, quickly develops a liking to Sarah, and the two bond during lunch in the break room. Adam grows concerned about this and tells Sarah to stop spending so much time with Gordon, prompting her to quit in anger. Adam later apologies, but reiterates that there must be boundaries between home and work. Sarah accepts the apology, and Adam convinces her to return to work.

Crosby (Dax Shepard) meets Jasmine (Joy Bryant) and Jabbar (Tyree Brown) at the airport, where they are returning from Jasmine's pursuit of a dancing career in New York City. Later, however, she tells Crosby she has been chosen to join a European tour company and will be gone for a few weeks. Crosby wants Jabbar to stay with him on his houseboat. Jasmine reluctantly agrees, but when Renee (Tina Lifford) is unimpressed with Crosby's accommodations, she convinces Jasmine that Jabbar should stay with her, which results in a fight between Crosby and Jasmine. The next day, however, Crosby agrees staying with Renee would ultimately be better for Jabbar. Crosby, Renee and Jabbar later share a tearful goodbye with Jasmine at the airport as she leaves for Europe.

Julia (Erika Christensen) has trouble dealing with the surprising complexities of her six-year-old daughter Sydney's (Savannah Paige Rae) relationships. After dropping Sydney off at school, Julia is approached by Sydney's classmate Amy (Jasmine Alveran), who would like a playdate with Sydney. Impressed by her direct approach, Julia accepts, but is later told by Joel (Sam Jaeger) they will have to cancel because Amy was mean to the sister of Sydney's best friend. Later, Julia tells Amy's mother Cynthia (Elena Evangelo) they must cancel, but Cynthia grows angry when Julia explains the reason. Julia tries to resolve the issue by claiming she mixed Cynthia up with the mother of a different Amy, but Joel later tells her that Amy's mother is now angry. Julia stops trying to resolve matters, declaring it will blow over.

Kristina (Monica Potter) is visited by her friend Suze (Amanda Foreman) who tells her she and her husband Phil (Phil Abrams) have separated due to the stresses brought on by their son Noel's (Nicholas Lobue) Asperger syndrome. Kristina fears her marriage with Adam could experience similar problems because her son Max (Max Burkholder) also has Asperger syndrome. Kristina offers to watch Noel after school while as Suze and Phil work out the divorce. Adam gets very stressed by Noel's presence, so Kristina decides to take Noel, Max and Haddie (Sarah Ramos) out to dinner so Adam can have a quiet night to himself. However, Adam decides he would rather be with his family, and delights Kristina by joining them at the restaurant.

== Production ==
"No Good Deed" was written by Tyler Bensinger and directed by Lawrence Trilling. It marked the second in a string of appearances by William Baldwin in his recurring role as Gordon Flint, and set the foundation for what would later grow into a romantic subplot between the Gordon and Sarah characters. The episode also included guest appearances by Amanda Foreman, Phil Abrams and Nicholas Lobue as the Lessing family, all of whom had appeared in the first season as a family acquainted with Adam and Kristina based on their similar experiences raising a child with Asperger syndrome. Tina Lifford, who guest stars in "No Good Deed" as Jasmine's mother Renee, also made previous appearances in the first season.

== Cultural references ==
While Sarah's father Zeek is watching her children, he and Sarah's son Drew play Wii, a motion-controller video game console made by Nintendo. Upon seeing this, Sarah reveals her lack of knowledge about current video games by insisting they cannot simply play Pac-Man all day, a reference to an interactive maze video game dating back to the 1980s. Adam listens in the car to singer-songwriter Ray LaMontagne, which causes disputes when Sarah tries to turn it off during their morning commute. He later listens to it by himself when he needs a respite from the stresses of family and work. Several LaMontagne songs are featured in "No Good Deed", including "Beg, Steal or Borrow", "Are We Really Through?" and "Devil's in the Jukebox". Other songs featured in the episode included "California Here I Come" by Bill Evans, "You Come Up Like a Rose" by The Northstar Session, "The Hampster Dance Song" by Hit Crew and "On My Way Back Home" by Band of Horses.

== Reception ==
In its original American broadcast, "No Good Deed" was seen by an average of 5.85 million viewers, according to Nielsen Media Research. It received a 2.7 rating/7 share among adults between age 18 and 49, a nearly 10 percent decrease from the previous week's season premiere episode, "I Hear You, I See You", "No Good Deed" was outperformed in its 10 p.m. timeslot by the latter half of the two-hour season premiere of NCIS: Los Angeles on CBS, which drew an average of 13.6 million viewers for the second hour, and by the series premiere of the crime drama Detroit 1-8-7 on ABC, which drew an average 9.75 million viewers.

Emily St. James of The A.V. Club felt the episode did a good job providing all four of the Braverman siblings with adequate screentime for their subplots. She described Dax Shepard as "best in show", complimenting his acting during comedic scenes like showing Renee his houseboat, and dramatic scenes like greeting Jasmine and Jabbar at the airport. However, St. James described Julia's subplot as "largely a throwaway" and said the writers seemed to be having trouble finding things for her to do. CNN writer Camille Wright Felton praised the episode, and said she particularly admired how Crosby's character had developed from an immature man afraid of commitment at the series premiere into a father dedicated to his son. Felton also called the scene where Adam comes home, finds the house to be loud and crazy, then silently slips back out the door to be the "best scene of the night".
