= Good Die Young (disambiguation) =

"Good Die Young" is a 2014 song by Divinyls.

Good Die Young may refer to:

- Good Die Young, a song by D12 from the album D12 World

== See also ==
- The Good Die Young, a 1954 film
- The Good Die Young, a 2023 "anti-obituary" by Jacobin and Verso Books about Henry Kissinger
- Good Dye Young, a hair dye line created by Hayley Williams of Paramore
- Only the good die young (disambiguation)
  - "Only the Good Die Young", a song by Billy Joel
  - "No-One but You (Only the Good Die Young)" a song by Queen
