= The Skeleton Key =

2005 film by Iain Softley

Skeleton Key
- Theatrical release poster
- Directed by: Iain Softley
- Written by: Ehren Kruger
- Produced by: Michael Shamberg; Stacey Sher; Iain Softley; Daniel Bobker
- Starring: Kate Hudson; Gena Rowlands; Peter Sarsgaard; Joy Bryant; John Hurt
- Cinematography: Dan Mindel
- Edited by: Joe Hutshing
- Music by: Edward Shearmur
- Production companies: Shadowcatcher Entertainment; Double Feature Films
- Distributed by: Universal Pictures
- Release dates: July 29, 2005 (United Kingdom); August 12, 2005 (United States)
- Running time: 104 minutes
- Country: United States
- Language: English
- Budget: $43 million
- Box office: $94 million

The Skeleton Key is a 2005 American supernatural folk horror film directed by Iain Softley and starring Kate Hudson, Gena Rowlands, John Hurt, Peter Sarsgaard, and Joy Bryant. The screenplay by Ehren Kruger follows a New Orleans hospice nurse who begins a job at a Terrebonne Parish plantation home and becomes entangled in a mystery involving the house, its former inhabitants, and Hoodoo rites that took place there. The Skeleton Key was released by Universal Pictures on July 29, 2005 in the United Kingdom and August 12, 2005 in the United States. The film received mixed reviews from critics and grossed $94 million on a budget of $43 million.

== Plot ==
Hospice aide Caroline Ellis quits her position at a nursing home and is hired as the caretaker of an isolated plantation house in Terrebonne Parish, Louisiana. Violet Devereaux, the aging matron of the house, needs help looking after her husband Benjamin, who was mostly paralyzed by an apparent stroke. At the insistence of the family's estate lawyer, Luke Marshall, Caroline accepts the position.

After Ben attempts to escape his room during a storm, Caroline uses a skeleton key that Violet gave her and investigates the house's attic, where Violet said Ben suffered his stroke. She discovers a secret room filled with ritual paraphernalia. Caroline confronts Violet, who reveals that the room used to belong to two African American servants who were forced to work at the house for the Thorpe family 90 years prior. The servants, Mama Cecile and Papa Justify, were renowned hoodoo practitioners who were lynched after conducting a rite with the Thorpes' two children, from whom Violet and Ben later bought the house. Violet tells Caroline that they keep no mirrors in the house because they see reflections of Cecile and Justify in them. Caroline later discovers a phonograph record from the attic, Conjure of Sacrifice, a recording of Papa Justify reciting a hoodoo rite.

Caroline surmises that Ben's stroke was caused by hoodoo but believes that his paralytic state is a nocebo effect induced by his own belief rather than something supernatural. Taking advice from her friend Jill, Caroline visits a hidden hoodoo shop in a nearby laundromat, where a hoodoo woman gives her tools and instructions to cure Ben. After she conducts the rite, Ben regains some ability to move and speak, and he begs Caroline to get him away from Violet.

Caroline tells Luke that she is suspicious of Violet, but he remains skeptical. They travel to a gas station that Caroline previously noted was lined with brick dust, which she was told is a hoodoo defense; supposedly, no one who means one harm can pass a line of brick dust. She asks one of the proprietors, a blind woman, about the Conjure of Sacrifice, which she learns is a spell wherein the caster steals the remaining years of life from the victim. Increasingly convinced of hoodoo's authenticity, Caroline fears that Violet will soon cast the spell on Ben.

Caroline discovers that Violet is unable to pass a line of brick dust laid across one of the house's doorways, confirming her suspicions. She incapacitates Violet and attempts to escape the house with Ben, but the front gate is chained shut. Caroline hides Ben on the property and travels to Luke's office for help. Luke, revealed to be Violet's accomplice, brings Caroline back to the house. Caroline escapes, gets into a fight with Violet, and violently pushes her down the stairs, breaking her legs. With strategic use of brick dust, Caroline flees to the attic, calls 9-1-1 and Jill for help, and casts what she believes is a protective spell. Violet, having caught up with her, reveals Caroline has inadvertently trapped herself inside a protective circle. Luke plays the Conjure of Sacrifice, as Violet pushes a full-length mirror at Caroline, which reflects the original owner's daughter, then Violet, and lastly Mama Cecile. When the mirror collides with Caroline, her soul switches bodies with Violet's.

Violet—revealed to be in fact Mama Cecile, who had been occupying Violet's body through the Conjure—wakes up in Caroline's body, and force-feeds Caroline (now in Violet's body) a potion that induces a stroke-like paralytic state like Ben's. Luke—actually Papa Justify who possessed Luke after living as Ben like Cecile did with Violet—arrives upstairs, revealing that Mama Cecile and Papa Justify have been conducting the Conjure of Sacrifice on new people since their supposed deaths; they had swapped bodies with the two Thorpe children just before the lynching. Because hoodoo is only effective on those who believe in it, Cecile and Justify had to wait for Caroline to come to believe through her own investigation.

Emergency services arrive the next morning and take Caroline and Ben away, trapped in their paralyzed dying bodies; when Jill arrives, "Luke" tells her that the Devereauxes left their estate to Caroline, ensuring that Cecile and Justify will continue to occupy the house.

== Cast ==
- Kate Hudson as Caroline Ellis
- Gena Rowlands as Violet Devereaux
- John Hurt as Benjamin "Ben" Devereaux
- Peter Sarsgaard as Luke Marshall
- Joy Bryant as Jill Dupay
- Jeryl Prescott as Mama Cecile
- Ronald McCall as Papa Justify
- Thomas Uskali as Robertson Thorpe
- Jen Apgar as Madeleine Thorpe
- Forrest Landis as Martin Thorpe
- Jamie Lee Redmon as Grace Thorpe

== Production ==
=== Casting ===
Director Iain Softley cast Kate Hudson in the lead role of Caroline Ellis. Hudson was compelled by the screenplay, which she said she finished reading "in 45 minutes", as well as the film's small cast and character development. Hudson's pregnancy at the time delayed principal photography for eight months.

Actor John Hurt was offered the role of the mute, stroke-ridden Ben Devereaux by director Iain Softley, and accepted, commenting: "He told me with considerable seriousness that it was a very important part and it didn't have any words. So I did, then, start thinking in terms of well, this is a very nice idea. I've always been looking for a part that doesn't have to speak. It's got Gena Rowlands. It's New Orleans. And it's just got all the makings of a very good film I thought." Gena Rowlands was cast as Violet Devereaux, and decided to take the role as she had never made a horror film before.

=== Filming ===
The Skeleton Key was filmed in the spring of 2004 at the Felicity Plantation, located on the Mississippi River in Saint James Parish, Louisiana. While filming a nighttime sequence during a rainstorm, Gena Rowlands slipped and fell, breaking her hand. She was forced to take a five-week break from shooting, after which filming of her remaining scenes was completed in California.

== Release ==
=== Box office ===
The Skeleton Key was released in the United Kingdom on July 29, 2005, and in the United States on August 12, 2005. It grossed $92 million worldwide. In the U.S., the film earned $16.1 million in its first weekend, reaching number 2 at the box office; the total domestic gross was $47.9 million.

=== Critical response ===
Review aggregator Rotten Tomatoes reports that 37% of 149 surveyed critics gave the film a positive review; the average rating is 5.3/10. The site's consensus reads: "Thanks to its creaky and formulaic script, The Skeleton Key is more mumbo-jumbo than hoodoo and more dull than scary." Metacritic rated it 47/100 based on 32 reviews. Audiences polled by CinemaScore gave the film an average grade of "C+" on an A+ to F scale.

Most of the reviews were mixed. Roger Ebert wrote: "The Skeleton Key is one of those movies that explains too much while it is explaining too little, and leaves us with a surprise at the end that makes more sense the less we think about it. But the movie's mastery of technique makes up for a lot." The Guardian's Peter Bradshaw awarded the film three out of five stars, noting: "It's a pretty thankless role for poor John Hurt, and there are some plot holes. But there's some shrewd satire of racism as the modern south's persistent, dirty little secret and screenwriter Ehren Kruger's third act conjures up a neat little shiver." Carina Chocano of the Los Angeles Times praised the film, calling it "tightly plotted and suspenseful enough to keep you guessing until the satisfying, unexpected end, which is worth suspending disbelief for," adding that "Hudson holds her own among impressive company. Not that Hurt has a whole lot to do other than grab an occasional wrist and recoil at his face in the mirror, and the usually measured Sarsgaard oversells it a bit, but Rowlands takes to the part like a fly to a shucked oyster." Susan King, also of the Los Angeles Times compared the film to The Uninvited (1944) and The Innocents (1961).

Manohla Dargis of The New York Times criticized the film for its plot, describing it as "enjoyably inane," and also noted that the film "indulges in almost every conceivable regional and [Southern Gothic] genre cliché." USA Today wrote that the film "employs intriguing camera angles to heighten some of the suspense. It's too bad the movie goes over the top and falls apart in the last third." Stephanie Zacharek wrote in Salon: "Softley, working from a script by Ehren Kruger, puts so much care into layering moods and textures that he doesn't always scoot the action along as briskly as he should." In The Seattle Times, Moira McDonald wrote that the film is "occasionally scary but more often silly." In her review for The Austin Chronicle, Marjorie Baumgarten wrote: "Director Softley again shows his gifts for creating atmospheric milieus...Yet the movie, overall, lacks tension and suspense. In Film Journal International, Edward Alter wrote that, "Iain Softley (K-PAX) and cinematographer Dan Mindel make the most of the setting," but concluded that the film was, "a paint-by-numbers supernatural thriller that's more interesting for its locations than for its story."

Jennie Punter in The Globe and Mail called the film, "stylishly made but disappointingly lightweight." Writing for the Chicago Tribune, Jessica Reeves called the film "serviceable but ultimately disappointing". In his annual film guide, Leonard Maltin rated the film mediocre, stating that it was "well-produced and occasionally suspenseful, but populated by unpleasant characters and a story that moves too slowly." In the annual DVD & Video Guide, Marsha Porter wrote, "A few good scares can't compensate for a sluggish pace, and the climactic twist comes as a surprise only because it doesn't make sense."

=== Home media ===
Universal Pictures Home Entertainment released The Skeleton Key on DVD in both widescreen and fullscreen editions on November 15, 2005. Universal later released the film on HD DVD on May 22, 2007, and on Blu-ray on September 7, 2010. The Australian label Imprint Films released a limited edition Blu-ray on October 25, 2023.

== See also ==
- Viy (story) — horror novella by the writer Nikolai Gogol.
