= No good deed goes unpunished =

Sardonic saying

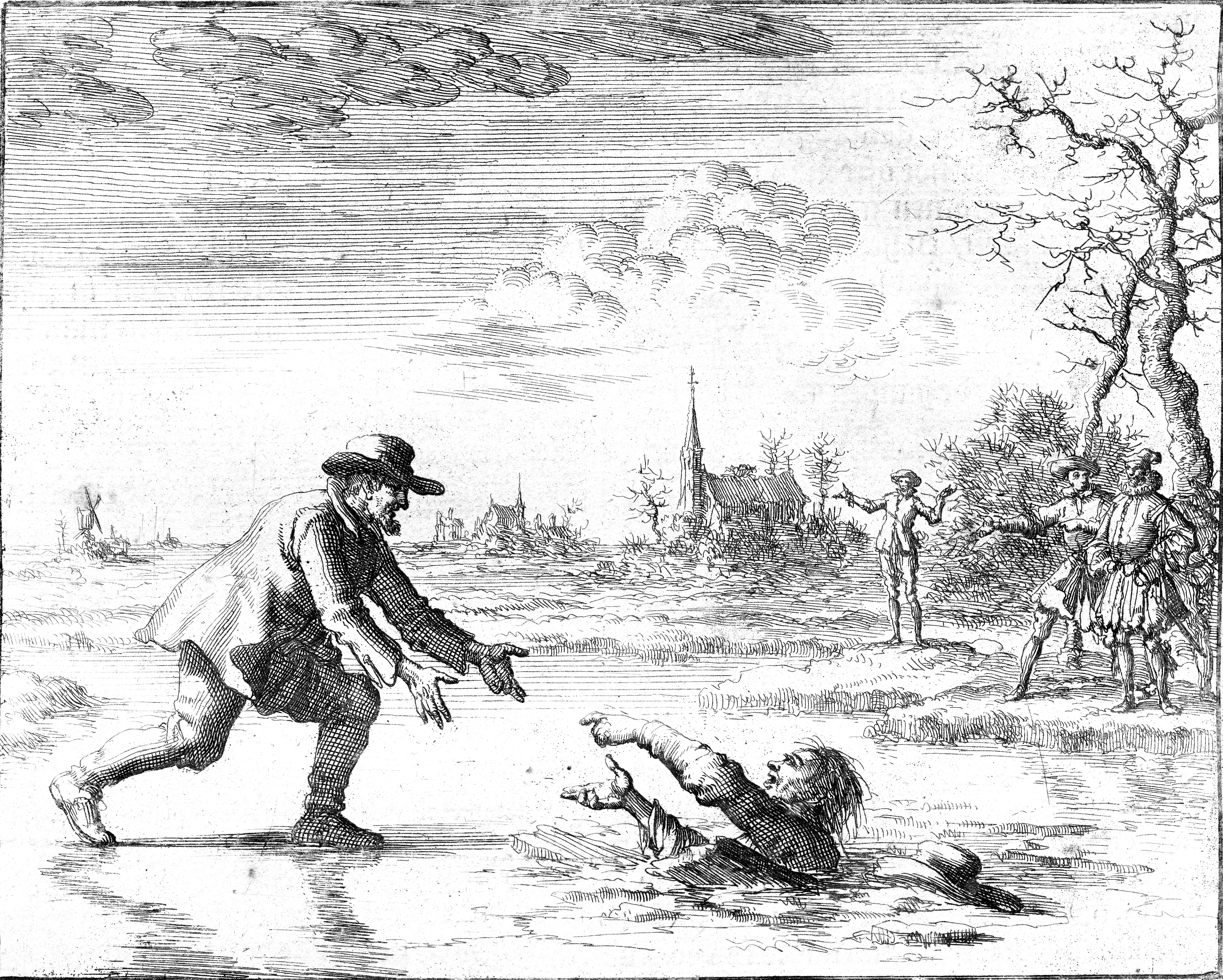
After prison escapee Dirk Willems turned around to save his pursuer from drowning, he was recaptured and executed.

The phrase "No good deed goes unpunished" is a sardonic commentary on the frequency with which acts of kindness backfire on those who offer them. In other words, those who help others are doomed to suffer as a result of their helpfulness.

== Background ==
The phrase is first attested in Walter Map's 12th-century De nugis curialium, in whose fourth chapter the character Eudo adhered to inverted morality "left no good deed unpunished, no bad one unrewarded".

Conventional moral wisdom holds that evil deeds are punished by divine providence and good deeds are rewarded by divine providence:

For as punishment is to the evil act, so is reward to a good act. Now no evil deed is unpunished, by God the just judge. Therefore no good deed is unrewarded, and so every good deed merits some good. (Note: Works related to Summa Theologiae/Supplement to the Third Part/Question 14#Art. 4 - Whether works done without charity merit any, at least temporal, good? at Wikisource)

— Thomas Aquinas, Summa Theologica

This is related to the concepts of Hell and of karma.

=== Modern expression ===
The modern expression "No good deed goes unpunished" is an ironic twist on this conventional morality.

The ironic usage of the phrase appears to be a 20th-century invention, found for example in Brendan Gill's 1950 novel The Trouble of One House. It is also featured prominently in the song "No Good Deed", from the 2003 hit Broadway musical Wicked. A satirical poem by Franklin Pierce Adams with the title "No Good Deed Goes Unpunished (So Shines a Good Deed in a Naughty World)" also exists.

In 2005, author David Helvarg introduced the concept that the punishment may be a form of retaliation, in a piece he wrote for Grist Magazine, "Remember that sign they hung up in an EPA office during the Reagan administration, 'No good deed goes unpunished'? Under George Bush, no good science goes unpunished."

== See also ==
- Flogging a dead horse
- Only the good die young
- No Good Deed (song)
- Tragic hero
