= Creep wit' Me =

Creep Wit' Me

Studio album by Ill Al Skratch
- Released: August 2, 1994
- Studio: The Soundtrack Facility (New York, NY)
- Genre: East Coast hip-hop
- Length: 54:45
- Label: Mercury
- Producer: LoRider; The LG Experience

Ill Al Skratch chronology
Creep Wit' Me (1994)	Keep It Movin' (1997)

Singles from Creep Wit' Me
- 1. "Where My Homiez? (Come Around My Way)" Released: June 7, 1994; 2. "I'll Take Her" Released: August 30, 1994; 3. "Chill With That" Released: February 7, 1995

Professional ratings
Review scores
Source	Rating
AllMusic	4/5 stars
RapReviews	6.5/10
The Source	3.5/5 stars

Creep Wit' Me is the debut studio album by American hip-hop duo Ill Al Skratch. It was released on August 2, 1994 via Mercury Records. Recording sessions took place at the Soundtrack Facility in New York City. Produced by the LG Experience and LoRider, it features guest appearances from Brian McKnight, L.R.C., Zoundwavez and Mark Sparks.

The album peaked at number 137 on the Billboard 200 and number 22 on the Top R&B/Hip-Hop Albums charts in the United States. Its lead single, "Where My Homiez? (Come Around My Way)", reached number 34 on the Hot R&B/Hip-Hop Songs chart. The album's second single, "I'll Take Her", became the most successful one, peaking at number 62 on the Billboard Hot 100 and number 16 on the Hot R&B/Hip-Hop Songs charts. The song "Chill with That" was released as the third and final single from the album.

== Track listing ==
No.	Title	Writer(s)	Length
1.	"They Got Love for Us"	Alphonse J. Constant; Lorenzo H. Grooms; Patrick O. Harvey; Anthony T. Prendatt	1:21
2.	"Where My Homiez? (Come Around My Way)"	Constant; Grooms; Harvey; Prendatt	5:41
3.	"This Is for My Homiez"	Constant; Grooms; Harvey; Prendatt; Keith Staten	5:36
4.	"I'll Take Her" (featuring Brian McKnight)	Constant; Grooms; Harvey; Prendatt	4:53
5.	"Chill With That"	Constant; Grooms; Harvey; Prendatt	4:53
6.	"Where My Homiez? (Come Around My Way)" (Dub Version)	Constant; Grooms; Harvey; Prendatt	6:11
7.	"Creep Wit' Me"	Constant; Grooms; Harvey; Mike Real	3:51
8.	"Get Dough"	Constant; Grooms; Harvey; Prendatt	4:45
9.	"The Brooklyn Uptown Connection" (featuring ZoundwaveZ, LRC, and Mark Sparks)	Constant; Grooms; Michael Lamont; L.R.C.; Harvey; Prendatt	4:20
10.	"Classic Shit" (Ill's Solo)	Constant; Grooms; Harvey; Prendatt	4:14
11.	"Summertime (It's All Good)" (Al's Solo)	Constant; Grooms; Harvey; Prendatt; Staten	4:34
12.	"I'll Take Her" (Brian's Flow)	Constant; Grooms; Harvey; Prendatt	4:26
Total length:			54:45

== Personnel ==
- Lorenzo "Big Ill" Grooms — vocals
- Alphonse "Al Skratch" Constant — vocals
- Brian McKnight — vocals (tracks: 4, 12)
- L.R.C. — vocals (track 9)
- Michael "Zoundwavez" Lamont — vocals (track 9)
- Mark Sparks — vocals (track 9)
- Tawatha Agee — backing vocals
- Lisa Fischer — backing vocals
- Kenneth Staten — backing vocals
- LaTasha Spencer — backing vocals
- Jerry Elcock — backing vocals
- Mike Real — voice
- Anthony "LoRider/Tony P." Prendatt — guitar, keyboards, bass, producer, arrangement, engineering, sequencing, editing
- Michael Joseph Tyler — guitar
- Loris Holland — Hammond B3 organ
- Patrick "The LG Experience" Harvey — bass, percussion, producer, arrangement, sequencing, editing
- Michael Fossenkemper — mixing
- Dominick Barbera — engineering assistant
- Ken Lewis — engineering assistant
- Matthew Tuffli — engineering assistant
- Michael Iverson — engineering assistant
- Tony Volante — sequencing, editing
- Tom Coyne — mastering
- Robert S. Cavicchio — executive producer
- Bruce Carbone — executive producer
- Rachelle Clinton — photography

== Charts ==
Chart (1994)	Peak position
US Billboard 200	137
US Top R&B/Hip-Hop Albums (Billboard)	22
