= Rhythm City Volume One: Caught Up =

Usher: Rhythm City, Vol. 1 - Caught Up
- Directed by: Director X
- Written by: Director X
- Story by: Anwar Burton; Todd Sams
- Produced by: Jil Hardin; Usher Raymond IV; Jonetta Patton; Samantha Lecca; Ericka Danko
- Starring: Usher; Joy Bryant; Clifton Powell; Naomi Campbell; Sean Combs
- Cinematography: Jeff Cutter
- Edited by: Jarrett Fijal
- Music by: Usher
- Production company: Sony Legacy
- Distributed by: LaFace Records; Zomba
- Release date: December 31, 2004
- Running time: 20 minutes
- Country: United States
- Language: English

Rhythm City Volume 1: Caught Up is a 20-minute mini movie from the American artist Usher, that aired on New Year's Eve 2004 on Fox. The video followed his 2004 recording Confessions that would sell 1.1 million copies in its first week, the highest ever for an R&B debut. The movie features appearances from Joy Bryant, Ryan Seacrest, Clifton Powell, Naomi Campbell, and Sean Combs. The mini movie featured musical performances from the songs "Seduction," "Caught Up," "Red Light," and "Take Your Hand" from the Confessions album.

== Credits ==
- Directed by: Director X
- Produced by: Jil Hardin
- Executive Producer: Usher Raymond IV
  Jonetta Patton
  Samantha Lecca
  Ericka Danko
- Cinematographer: Jeff Cutter
  Omer Ganhai
- Product Designer: Robb Buono
- Written by: Director X
- Starring: Usher
- Co-starring: Joy Bryant
  Clifton Powell
  Naomi Campbell
  Sean Combs
- Costumes: Laury Smith
- Choreography: Todd Sams
  Anwar Burton
- Dancers

== Music videos ==
- Yeah!
- Burn
- Confessions Part II
- My Boo

== Track listing ==
Credits adapted from the liner notes of Rhythm City Volume One: Caught Up.

No.	Title	Writer(s)	Producer(s)	Length
1.	"Dot Com"	James Gass; Robert Daniels; Robin Thicke; Usher Raymond	Pro J; Thicke	5:06
2.	"Doin the Most"	Bobby Ross Avila; Issiah J. Avila; James Harris III; Terry Lewis; Raymond	Jimmy Jam & Terry Lewis; Avila Brothers^{[a]}	4:03
3.	"It Is What It Is"	B. Avila; I. Avila; Harris; Lewis; Raymond; James Q. Wright	Jam; Lewis; Avila Brothers^{[a]}	4:39
4.	"What You Need"	Adonis Shropshire; Jermaine Dupri; Manuel Seal	Dupri; Seal^{[a]}	3:38

Notes

- ^{^a} denotes co-producer

== Certifications ==
Region	Certification	Certified units/sales
Australia (ARIA)	Gold	7,500^{^}
Canada (Music Canada)	Platinum	10,000^{^}
^{^} Shipments figures based on certification alone.
