= Ill Al Skratch =

American hip hop group

- Origin: New York City, U.S.
- Genres: Hip hop; East Coast hip hop
- Years active: 1993–1997; 2012–present
- Labels: Mercury (1994–1997); IAS (2012–present)
- Members: Big Ill; Al Skratch

Ill Al Skratch (also known as Brooklyn/Uptown Connection) is a hip hop duo consisting of two rappers, Big Ill from Brooklyn and Al Skratch from Harlem (Uptown). They are best known for their singles "Where My Homiez (Come Around My Way)” and "I'll Take Her".

== Biography ==
The duo's first appearance on record was their smash hit 1994 single named "Where My Homiez? (Come Around My Way)." The song became an unexpected mainstream hit & BET video staple in the early summer of 1994, & unexpectedly charted on both Billboard & Hot R&B/Hip-Hop Singles & Tracks. The single was so big that Mercury Records rushed to shoot a follow up video & single to capitalize on the success. Ill Al Skratch soon released a follow-up single named "I'll Take Her." in August. This song featured R&B musician Brian McKnight and was a runaway hit in the summer of 1994 reaching #62 on the Billboard Hot 100. Soon after releasing their first two hit singles, they released Creep Wit' Me to critical acclaim. It managed to reach the Billboard 200 and spawned a third single, "Chill With That."

Ill Al Skratch collaborated with various artists including Michael Jackson, Gina Thompson and Shaquille O'Neal from 1995 to 1996. Their works also appeared on the soundtracks of movies including New Jersey Drive and Panther. In 1997, they released Keep It Movin', an album that received little commercial success and critical attention. They have not recorded any music since their 1997 album, but their songs have appeared on compilations including 1998's Hip Hop with R&B Flava.

In 2012, Ill Al Skratch began releasing new music as B.U.C. (Brooklyn/Uptown Connection).

== Discography ==
=== Albums ===
Year	Title	Chart positions	
Year	Title	U.S.	U.S. R&B
1994	Creep Wit' Me: Released: August 2, 1994; Label: Mercury	137	22
1997	Keep It Movin': Released: April 22, 1997; Label: Mercury	–	55

=== Singles ===
Year	Song	Chart positions			Album
Year	Song	U.S. Hot 100	U.S. R&B	U.S. Rap	Album
1994	"Where My Homiez? (Come Around My Way)"	-	34	8	Creep Wit' Me
1994	"I'll Take Her" (featuring Brian McKnight)	62	16	5	Creep Wit' Me
1995	"Chill With That"	-	-	-	Creep Wit' Me
1997	"Yo Love" (featuring Crystal Johnson and Crystal Waters)	-	-	-	Keep It Movin'
1997	"Me & The Click"	-	-	-	Keep It Movin'
2012	"Bout My Money"	-	-	-	-
