= I'll Take Her =

Single by Ill Al Skratch featuring Brian McKnight

from the album Creep wit' Me
- B-side: "The Brooklyn Uptown Connection"
- Released: 1994
- Recorded: 1994
- Genre: Hip hop
- Length: 4:53
- Label: Mercury
- Songwriter(s): Alphonse J. Constant; Lorenzo Grooms; Patrick Harvey; Anthony L. Prendatt
- Producer(s): The LG Experience; LoRiDer

Ill Al Skratch singles chronology
"Where My Homiez?" (1994)	"I'll Take Her" (1994)	"Chill with That" (1995)

Brian McKnight singles chronology
"Let It Snow" (1993)	"I'll Take Her" (1994)	"Crazy Love" (1995)

Music video
- "I'll Take Her" on YouTube

"I'll Take Her" is a song by American hip hop group Ill Al Skratch featuring American R&B singer Brian McKnight. It was released in late 1994 through Mercury Records as the second single from the former's debut studio album Creep wit' Me. Produced by The LG Experience and LoRiDer, who utilized samples from Curtis Mayfield's "You're So Good to Me" and EPMD's "Jane".

The single peaked at number 62 on the Billboard Hot 100, number 16 on the Hot R&B/Hip-Hop Songs, number 5 on the Hot Rap Songs and number 13 on the Hot Dance Music/Maxi-Singles Sales.

== Track listing ==
No.	Title	Length
1.	"I'll Take Her" (Radio Version)
2.	"I'll Take Her" (Extended Version)
3.	"I'll Take Her" (Brian's Flow)
4.	"The Brooklyn Uptown Connection" (Club Version)
5.	"The Brooklyn Uptown Connection" (Instrumental)
6.	"The Brooklyn Uptown Connection" (Acapella)

== Charts ==
Charts (1994)	Peak position
US Billboard Hot 100	62
US Hot R&B/Hip-Hop Songs (Billboard)	16
US Hot Rap Songs (Billboard)	5
US Dance Singles Sales (Billboard)	13
