= Only the good die young =

"Only the good die young" is an English proverb, and it may also refer to:

- "Only the Good Die Young", a 1977 song by Billy Joel
- "Only the Good Die Young", a 1988 song by Iron Maiden from Seventh Son of a Seventh Son
- "No-One but You (Only the Good Die Young)", a 1997 song by Queen
- "Only the Good Die Young", a 2008 song by Def Leppard from Songs from the Sparkle Lounge
- "Only the Good...", the final episode in the original run of the British science fiction series Red Dwarf.

== See also ==
- No Good Deed (disambiguation)
- Good Die Young (disambiguation)
- "Nice Guys Finish Last"
