= Joy Bryant =

American actress and model

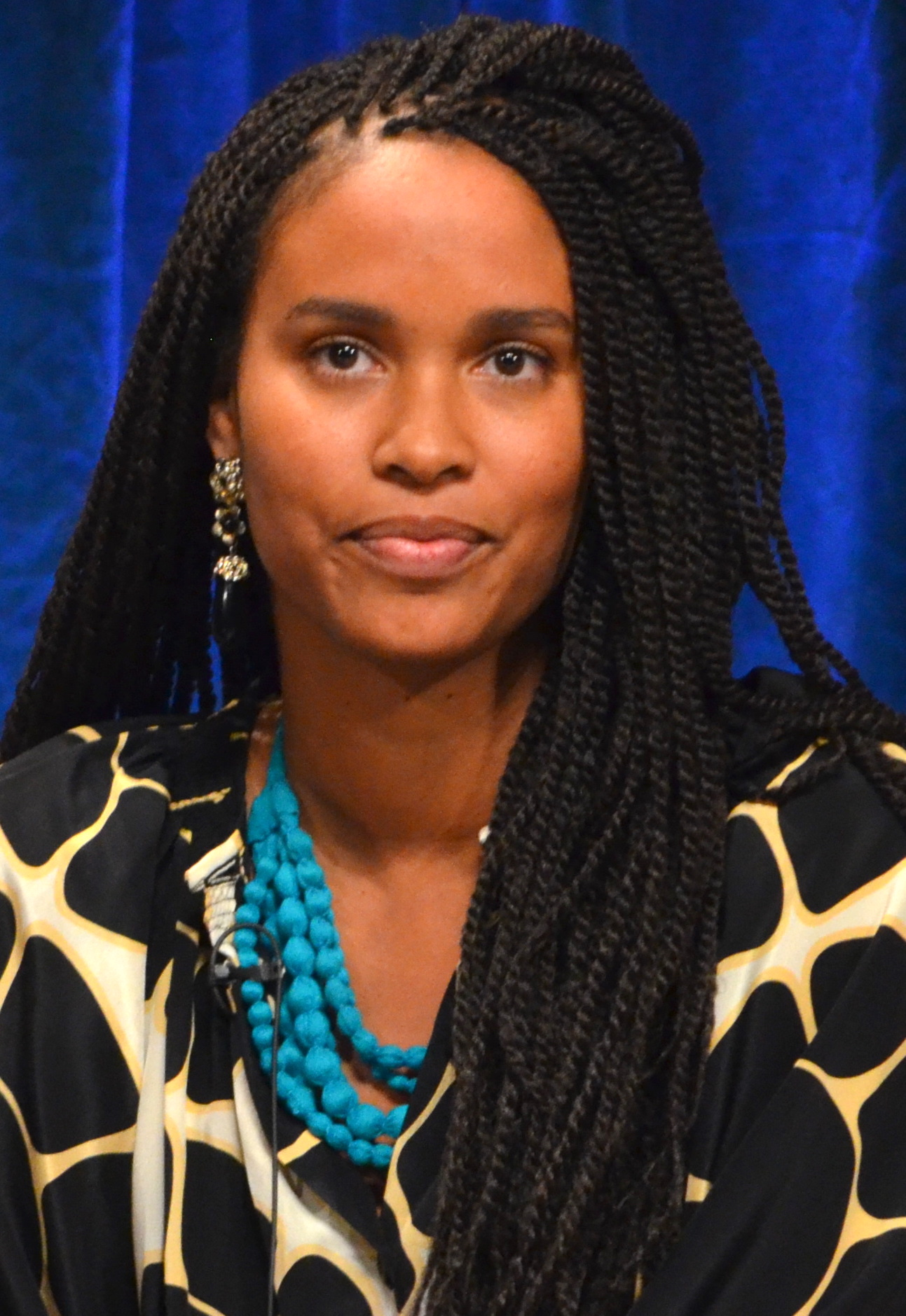
- Bryant at the Paleyfest 2013
- Born: October 18, 1974 (age 51); New York City, U.S.
- Education: Yale University
- Occupations: Actress; businesswoman; model
- Years active: 1994–present
- Height: 5 ft 10 in (1.78 m)
- Spouse: Dave Pope (m. 2008)

Joy Bryant (born October 18, 1974) is an American actress, businesswoman and fashion model. She has appeared in numerous films and television since beginning her acting career in 2001. She has received two NAACP Image Award nominations, and one Screen Actors Guild Award nomination.

Bryant began her career as a fashion model, appearing in advertisements for Ralph Lauren, Tommy Hilfiger, Gap, and Victoria's Secret. She made her film debut in 2001's Carmen: A Hip Hopera. Bryant had her breakthrough after being cast by Denzel Washington in his biographical drama film Antwone Fisher (2002), in which she played a U.S. Navy sailor. This was followed by a recurring guest role on the NBC series ER. Her subsequent film credits include Spider-Man 2 (2004), the horror film The Skeleton Key and the drama Get Rich or Die Tryin' (both 2005), and the historical drama Bobby (2006).

In 2010, Bryant was cast in the role of Jasmine Trussell in the NBC family drama series Parenthood, a role she portrayed for the series' entire six seasons before its finale in 2015. Bryant hosted her own action talk show Across the Board with Joy Bryant (2012–2014), which saw her interviewing celebrity guests. She has also appeared on television in guest roles on the series Girls (2017) and Ballers (2018).

== Early life ==
Bryant was born on October 18, 1974, in the South Bronx, New York to Joyce Bryant. She was raised by her grandmother, who helped support her on welfare. She started dancing at age three. Bryant would later reveal that she was conceived from a sexual assault against her mother, who was fifteen years old at the time of her birth, by an older adult male. Bryant stated: "[My mother] gave birth to me, not in love but in shame, after hiding her pregnancy from my grandmother for six months."

She described herself as a "nerd" growing up: "I read encyclopedias all day and watched TV. My grandmother, who raised me, emphasized the importance of education. For me it was about being self-sufficient and using my brain." While living in the Bronx, she graduated from CJHS 145x and was a member of the Fieldston Enrichment Program, an elite high school preparatory program. Bryant is a graduate of Westminster School, a boarding school in Simsbury, Connecticut. She studied Latin for a number of years in high school and was the president of the Latin club.

After graduating from Westminster, Bryant was a gifted student and earned a scholarship to Yale University, where she studied for two years before dropping out to pursue a modeling career. Bryant's grandmother died during her freshman year at Yale, which made her lose interest in studying, saying "I lost my biggest cheerleader, my rock. Being 'smart' didn’t matter to me anymore." She later completed her degree and graduated from Yale.

== Career ==
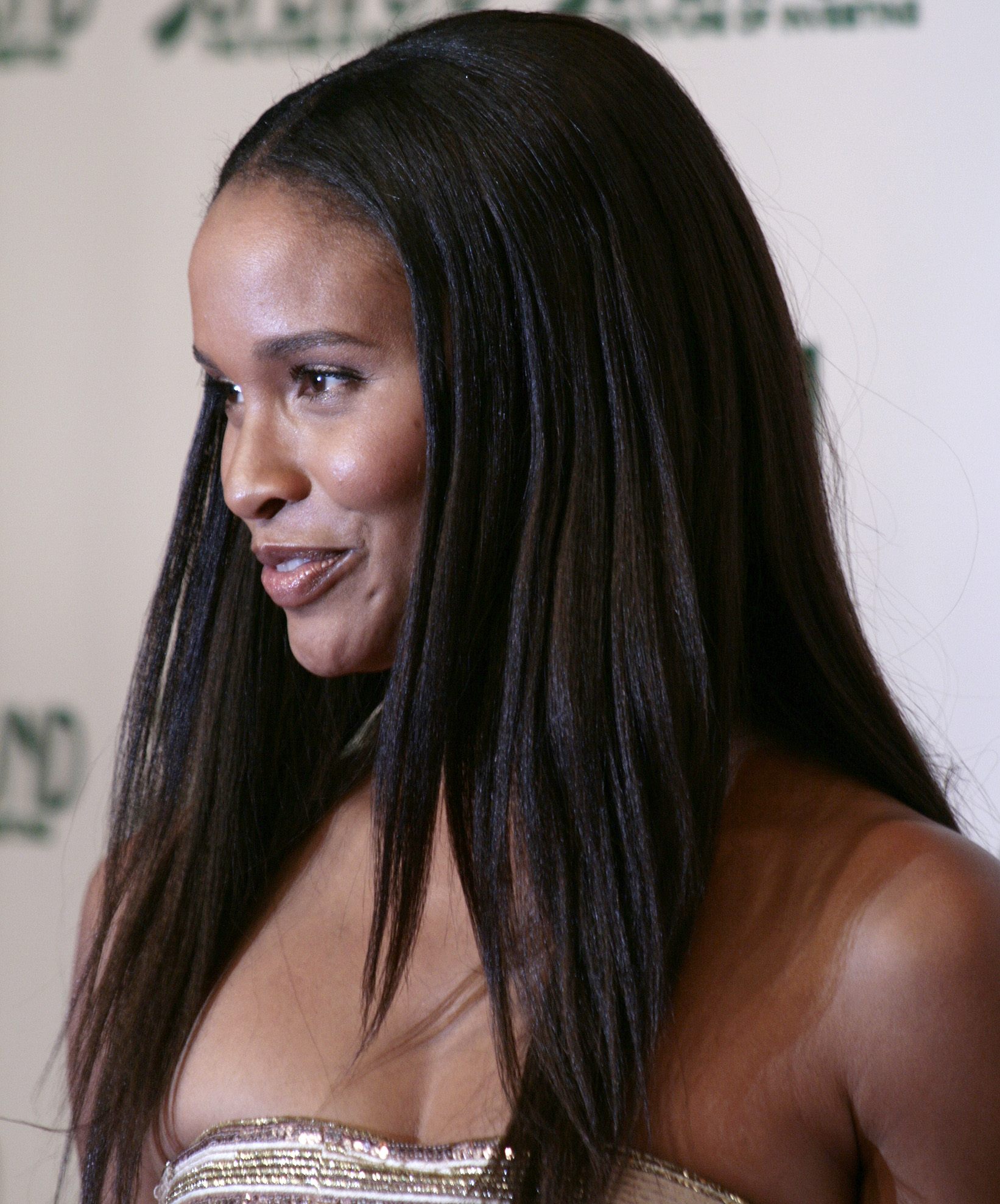
Bryant in 2009

=== Modeling ===
While enrolled as a student at Yale, Bryant was discovered by a modeling scout from Next Model Management and was selected to appear in Seventeen magazine's "Back to School" issue soon after. She began working as a fashion model in Paris. She appeared in advertisements for Gap, Victoria's Secret, Ralph Lauren, Tommy Hilfiger and Rocawear. In 2006, Bryant signed a multi-year contract with CoverGirl. She has walked the runway for Tommy Hilfiger and Givenchy. Bryant hosted BET's 2009 Rip the Runway fashion show with Derek Luke.

She has graced the cover of numerous magazines, including Teen Vogue, Complex, Lonny, Domino and Rolling Out. She has appeared in pictorials for InStyle, Harper's Bazaar, Paper, Vanity Fair, Vibe, Playboy, Stuff and Celebrity Skin.

=== Acting ===
Early in her career, Bryant played a small role in Ill Al Skratch's music video for the song "I'll Take Her" (1994). She went on to appear in numerous music videos, including playing the female lead in Santana's "Nothing at All" (2003) and Usher's "Caught Up" (2004). Her acting debut came in 2001 in Robert Townsend's film Carmen: A Hip Hopera, in which she portrayed one of Carmen’s best friends opposite Beyoncé and Mekhi Phifer. After a small role in the action comedy Showtime (2002), she made her big breakthrough in Denzel Washington's directorial debut, Antwone Fisher (2002). In 2003, she co-starred in the Mario Van Peebles drama film Baadasssss!, followed by a recurring guest role on the drama series ER. She portrayed Gina, Jessica Alba's character's best friend in the dance film Honey (2003), which grossed $65.3 million at the box office worldwide.

In 2005, she appeared in several high-profile films, including the horror film The Skeleton Key and the drama films London and Get Rich or Die Tryin', in the latter of which she played the childhood sweetheart of 50 Cent. In 2007, she had a minor part in the thriller film The Hunting Party starring Richard Gere and Terrence Howard, followed by a leading role in the ensemble comedy Welcome Home Roscoe Jenkins (2008). She also played the role of Tunde Adebimpe's love interest in "Will Do", a 2011 TV on the Radio music video.

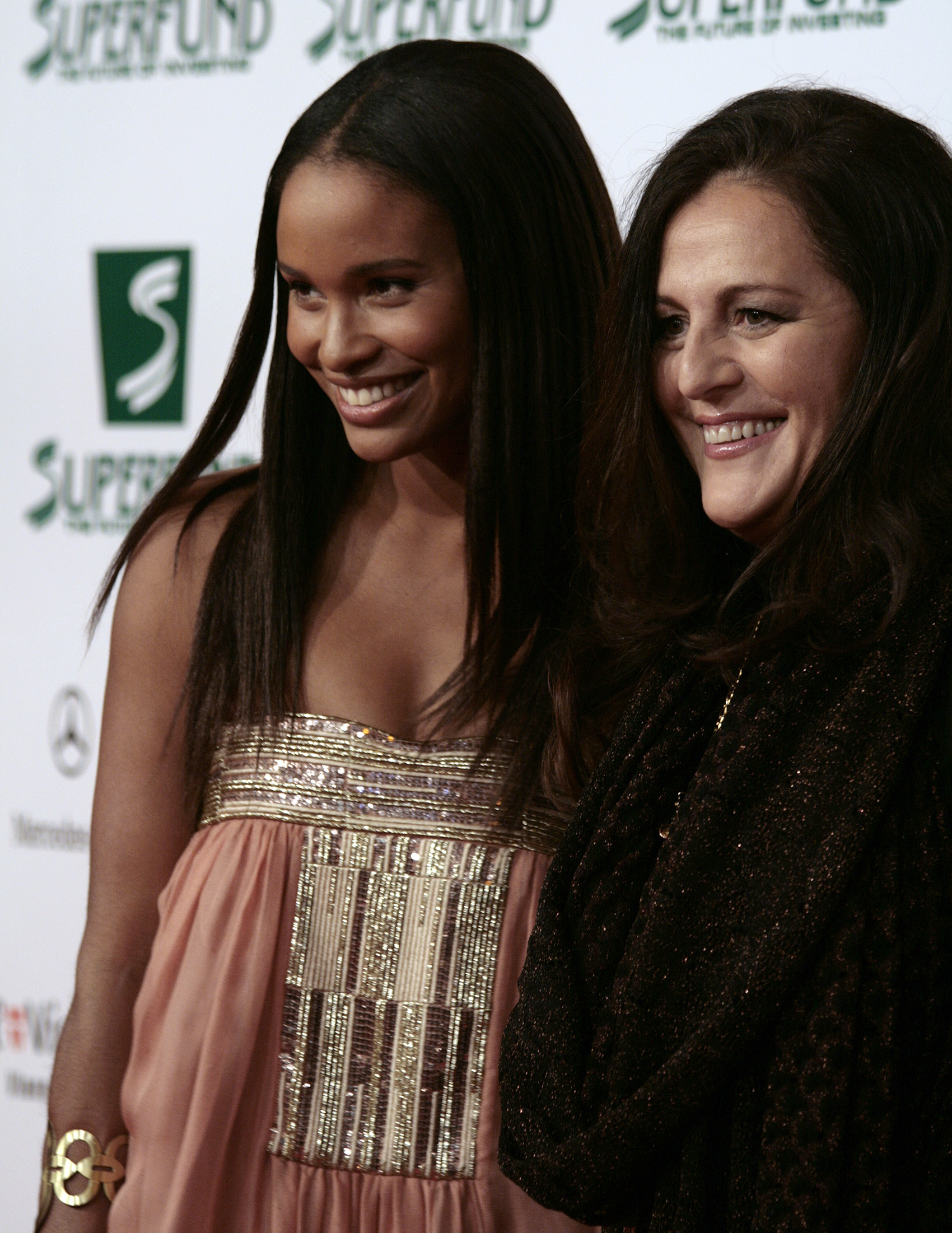
Bryant and Angela Missoni attending 2009 Women's World Awards in Vienna, Austria.

Bryant starred as Jasmine Trussell in NBC's family comedy-drama series Parenthood (2010–2015). BuddyTV ranked her #19 on its TV's 100 Sexiest Women of 2011 list. In 2012, she launched her own web series, Across the Board with Joy Bryant, which featured interviews with celebrity guests. An action talk show hosted by Bryant saw her and the guests doing different activities such as go-karting, climbing and pottery. The series consisted of ten episodes and aired on Reserve's YouTube channel. She had one of the main roles as Debbie Sullivan on the romantic comedy film About Last Night (2014) alongside Kevin Hart, Regina Hall and Michael Ealy. The film grossed $50 million at the box office.

In 2015, she had a recurring role as Erica Kincaid, a doctor, on the police procedural drama series Rosewood. In 2017, she had guest roles on television shows What Would Diplo Do? and Girls. The following year, Bryant was cast in a recurring role on the sports drama series Ballers, playing a successful public defender and mother of a rising football star. In 2019, she portrayed Lori Foster on Netflix's teen drama series Trinkets.

== Business ventures ==
She co-founded a production company in 2016. On January 13, 2021, Deadline announced that Bryant and producer Samantha Taylor Pickett launched a production company, Hot Sauce, with a three-year deal at Sony Pictures.

=== Fashion design ===
In June 2014, Bryant and her husband Dave Pope launched a clothing line, Basic Terrain, a casual sportswear to performance outerwear line. The collection was inspired by Bryant's love for the outdoors. Basic Terrain's pop-up store was opened in July 2015 at Satine, a clothing boutique in Los Angeles. Ten percent of the company's proceeds are donated to environmental organizations such as Earthjustice. In September 2016, Basic Terrain became available in chain department store Selfridges in the United Kingdom.

=== Writing ===
Bryant has written several personal essays for publications such as Lenny Letter and Refinery29. She has written about various topics, including her childhood, body insecurities and family. In 2016, The Cut announced that she was working on a book proposal for a collection of essays.

== Philanthropy ==
She is an ambassador of Oxfam's Sisters on the Planet, an organization that helps women fight hunger, poverty and climate change. In 2011, she designed a handbag for Botkier, named "Botkier Joy Satchel" with fifty percent of the proceeds from every bag’s sale went to Oxfam.

== Personal life ==
In October 2007, OK! magazine reported that Bryant was engaged to stuntman Dave Pope, who she met on the set of Welcome Home Roscoe Jenkins. They married on June 28, 2008, in the Hamptons. She owns a ranch house in Glendale, California. As of 2014, Bryant resided with her husband in Glendale.

== Filmography ==
=== Film ===
Year	Title	Role	Notes
2001	Carmen: A Hip Hopera	Nikki	Also as performer: "The B.L.A.Z.E. Song" and "Girls' Cali Dreams"
2002	Showtime	Lexi	
2002	Antwone Fisher	PO2 Cheryl Smolley, US Navy	
2002	Kite	Shane's Mother	Short
2003	Baadasssss!	Priscilla	
2003	Honey	Gina	
2004	Spider-Man 2	Woman at Web	
2004	Three Way	Rita Caswell	
2004	Haven	Sheila	
2005	Rhythm City Volume One: Caught Up	Asia	
2005	The Skeleton Key	Jill Dupay	
2005	London	Mallory	
2005	Get Rich or Die Tryin'	Charlene	
2006	Bobby	Patricia	
2007	The Hunting Party	Duck's Girlfriend	
2008	Welcome Home Roscoe Jenkins	Bianca Kittles	
2011	The Chicken Shack	Alicia	
2012	Hit and Run	Neve Tatum	
2014	About Last Night	Debbie Sullivan	
2026	You, Me & Tuscany	Anna's Mom	

=== Television ===
Year	Title	Role	Notes
2003–2004	ER	Valerie Gallant	Supporting cast (season 10); 3 episodes
2008	Entourage	Herself	Episode: "Play'n with Fire"
2008	The Rachel Zoe Project	Herself	Supporting cast (season 1); 3 episodes
2009	Virtuality	Alice Thibadeau	Television film
2009	Rip the Runway	Host	Television special
2010–2015	Parenthood	Jasmine Trussell	Main role
2011	Love Bites	Angie	Episode: "Keep on Truckin'" and Sky High"
2015–2016	Good Girls Revolt	Eleanor Holmes Norton	Main role
2015	The Advocate	Dr. Ryan Clarke	Television film
2016	FabLife	Guest / co-hostess	Episode: "Knife Be-Gone/Hot Summer Fashions/Joy Bryant/Chef Ted Hopson/Fire Up the Grill/Chef Graham Elliot/Oversized and Undersized Accessories"
2016	Rosewood	Dr. Erica Kincaid	Recurring role
2017	Girls	Marlowe	Episode: "Hostage Situation"
2017	What Would Diplo Do?	Chandra	Episode: "Screwged"
2018	Ballers	Jayda Crawford	Recurring role
2019–2020	Trinkets	Lori Foster	Recurring role
2020–2021	For Life	Marie Wallace	Main role
2021–2022	Cherish the Day	Sunday St. James	Main role
2024–present	The Spiderwick Chronicles	Helen Grace	Main role

=== Web series ===
Year	Title	Role	Notes
2012–2014	Across the Board with Joy Bryant	Host	10 episodes

=== Music videos ===
Year	Title	Artist	Role
1994	"I'll Take Her"	Ill Al Skratch	Woman
2003	"Nothing At All"	Santana feat. Musiq Soulchild	Female lead
2004	"Caught Up"	Usher	Love interest
2011	"Will Do"	TV on the Radio	Love interest

=== As producer ===
Year	Title	Role	Notes
2012	An Oversimplification of Her Beauty	Executive producer	Film
2021	Beba	Executive producer	Film

== Awards and nominations ==
Year	Award	Category	Work	Result
2003	Young Hollywood Awards	Breakthrough Performance - Female	Herself	Won
2003	Black Reel Awards	Best Supporting Actress	Antwone Fisher	Nominated
2005	Black Reel Awards	Best Supporting Actress	Baadasssss!	Nominated
2006	Hollywood Film Awards	Ensemble of the Year	Bobby	Won
2007	Screen Actors Guild	Outstanding Cast in a Motion Picture	Bobby	Nominated
2007	Broadcast Film Critics Association Awards	Best Acting Ensemble	Bobby	Nominated
2011	Bronx Walk of Fame	Honoree at the Bronx Walk of Fame	Herself	Won
2013	NAACP Image Awards	Outstanding Supporting Actress in a Drama Series	Parenthood	Nominated

== Authored articles ==
- Bryant Joy (April 6, 2016). "Stop Telling Me I Should Have Kids". Lenny Letter.
- Bryant, Joy (July 18, 2016). "Girl, You Beautiful". Refinery29.
- Bryant, Joy (November 15, 2017). "Her, Too: My Mother, and the Legacy of Abuse". Lenny Letter.
