= Parenthood (2010 TV series) =

American family drama series

- Title screen
- Genre: Family drama; Comedy drama
- Based on: Parenthood by: Lowell Ganz; Babaloo Mandel; Ron Howard
- Developed by: Jason Katims
- Starring: Peter Krause; Lauren Graham; Dax Shepard; Monica Potter; Erika Christensen; Sam Jaeger; Savannah Paige Rae; Sarah Ramos; Max Burkholder; Joy Bryant; Miles Heizer; Mae Whitman; Bonnie Bedelia; Craig T. Nelson; Tyree Brown; Xolo Maridueña
- Opening theme: "Forever Young" by Bob Dylan; "When We Were Young" by Lucy Schwartz (international version)
- Country of origin: United States
- Original language: English
- No. of seasons: 6
- No. of episodes: 103 (list of episodes)

Production
- Executive producers: Ron Howard; Brian Grazer; Jason Katims; Lawrence Trilling; Sarah Watson; David Nevins
- Producers: Dylan K. Massin; Patrick Ward; Jessica Goldberg
- Production location: Los Angeles, California
- Running time: 43 minutes
- Production companies: True Jack Productions; Imagine Television; Universal Media Studios (seasons 1–3); Universal Television (seasons 3–6); Open 4 Business Productions

Original release
- Network: NBC
- Release: March 2, 2010 – January 29, 2015

Related
- Parenthood (1989 film); Parenthood (1990 TV series)

Parenthood is an American family comedy-drama television series developed by Jason Katims and produced by Imagine Television and Universal Television for NBC. The show chronicles three generations of the Braverman clan.

Loosely based on the 1989 film of the same name, the series is the second adaptation of the film to air on television, preceded by the 1990–1991 TV series, which also aired on NBC. Following the release of Friday Night Lights, Katims approached Ron Howard and Brian Grazer with the idea of creating an updated, modern adaptation of the 1989 film and bringing it to television.

The series ran for six seasons from March 2, 2010, to January 29, 2015. The series was well received by television critics and earned several nominations and awards, including one Vision Award, a Critics' Choice Television Award, two Television Academy Honors awards, four Young Artist Awards, and three Entertainment Industries Council PRISM Awards. Despite positive reviews, the series never gained a strong audience; the pilot received the highest audience figures, with ratings declining thereafter.

The sixth and final season, consisting of 13 episodes, premiered on September 25, 2014. The series concluded on January 29, 2015.

== Series overview ==
The series is set in Berkeley, California, on the eastern shore of the San Francisco Bay. It follows three generations of the Braverman family: the patriarch, Ezekiel "Zeek" Braverman; the matriarch, Camille Braverman; and the families of their four children—Adam, Sarah, Crosby, and Julia.

Adam is married to Kristina, and they have three children: Haddie, Max, and Nora. Max is diagnosed with Asperger’s syndrome. Sarah is divorced from Seth and has two teenage children, Amber and Drew. Crosby is married to Jasmine, with whom he has a son, Jabbar, and a daughter, Aida. Julia is married to Joel, and they have a daughter, Sydney, as well as a son, Victor, whom they adopted after struggling to conceive a second child.

Season	Episodes	Originally released	
Season	Episodes	First released	Last released
1	13	March 2, 2010	May 25, 2010
2	22	September 14, 2010	April 19, 2011
3	18	September 13, 2011	February 28, 2012
4	15	September 11, 2012	January 22, 2013
5	22	September 26, 2013	April 17, 2014
6	13	September 25, 2014	January 29, 2015

== Cast and characters ==
- Peter Krause as Adam Braverman, the oldest Braverman sibling, father to Haddie, Max and Nora, and husband to Kristina, he previously worked at a shoe company, and then opened a recording studio with Crosby
- Lauren Graham as Sarah Braverman-Rizzoli, the second oldest sibling, single mother to Amber and Drew, later she marries her boss, Hank Rizzoli. At the beginning of the show, she's a bartender, but later becomes a photography assistant.
- Dax Shepard as Crosby Braverman, the third Braverman sibling and father to Jabbar and Aida, and husband to Jasmine, he's a music producer and owns a studio with Adam from season 3
- Monica Potter as Kristina Braverman, Adam's wife who works in politics, and mother to Haddie, Max and Nora
- Erika Christensen as Julia Braverman-Graham, the youngest Braverman sibling and mother to Sydney, Victor, Millie and Eddie; married to Joel Graham, she is a lawyer.
- Sam Jaeger as Joel Graham, Julia's husband, father to Sydney, Victor, Millie and Eddie, he's a licensed contractor.
- Savannah Paige Rae as Sydney Graham, Julia and Joel's daughter, Victor, Millie and Eddie's sister.
- Sarah Ramos as Haddie Braverman (main seasons 1–3; recurring season 4; guest seasons 5 & 6), Adam and Kristina's eldest daughter and child, Max and Nora's older sister, she attends Cornell in season 4.
- Max Burkholder as Max Braverman, Adam and Kristina's second child and only son who has Aspergers syndrome
- Joy Bryant as Jasmine Trussell, Jabbar and Aida's mother and Crosby's on/off girlfriend and later wife from season 3, she is a dancer
- Miles Heizer as Drew Holt, Sarah's shy and quiet son.
- Mae Whitman as Amber Holt, Sarah's outgoing daughter.
- Bonnie Bedelia as Camille Braverman, the matriarch of the family and an artist. Mother to Adam, Sarah, Crosby and Julia.
- Craig T. Nelson as Ezekiel "Zeek" Braverman, the patriarch of the family - father to Adam, Sarah, Crosby and Julia, who is a Vietnam veteran
- Tyree Brown as Jabbar Trussell (recurring season 1; main seasons 2–6), Jasmine and Crosby's son who first meets Crosby when he is 5
- Xolo Maridueña as Victor Graham (guest season 3; main seasons 4–6), Julia and Joel's son whom they adopt at the end of season 3

== Production ==
=== Development ===
Parenthood is based on the 1989 film of the same name, co-written and directed by Ron Howard. Following the release of the film, a television series was created and aired in 1990 on NBC but turned out to be unsuccessful and was cancelled after one season. Nearly two decades later, Jason Katims, the showrunner of Friday Night Lights, met with Howard and Brian Grazer to ask them to readapt the film on television, which they accepted though they were reluctant at first. The show was given the green-light from NBC in January 2009, and Katims finished writing the pilot script in early 2009.

=== Casting ===
Erika Christensen was the first actress to land a role in the pilot in early March 2009. By the end of the month, Peter Krause, Maura Tierney, Dax Shepard, Mae Whitman, Sarah Ramos and Craig T. Nelson were all attached to the drama. Nelson came aboard the project after passing on the role of Jay Pritchett in Modern Family. In April, Max Burkholder was chosen to portray Peter Krause's son. In that same month Bonnie Bedelia, Sam Jaeger and Monica Potter were cast. Diane Farr was originally chosen as Kristina Braverman, but she quickly left the series due to scheduling conflicts with Californication and was replaced by Potter.

The series was originally scheduled to premiere on NBC on September 23, 2009. However, on July 10, 2009, it was announced that Parenthood would be pushed back to midseason due to Tierney's breast cancer diagnosis. On September 10, 2009, a spokesperson for Tierney announced that she was leaving the show because of conflicts with her treatment schedule. Tierney's already-filmed scenes were deleted. On October 9, 2009, it was reported that Lauren Graham would replace Tierney in the upcoming series. Helen Hunt had been approached, but she and NBC could not come to a financial deal. The pilot was reshot in November.

Max Burkholder, who portrays a boy who has Asperger's, explained how they ensure his portrayal is accurate:

When I was first auditioning, they brought in a doctor who specializes in children with Asperger's and he told us the basic stuff. Then, since we started shooting, every couple of episodes I have a meeting with the executive producer, and the director of the episodes, and sometimes some of the writers, and a doctor specializing in Asperger's and we just talk about what Max would be doing in certain situations, like how he would react to certain things and if everyone was over here doing this, what would Max be doing?

Ray Romano joined the cast, in the role of Hank Rizzoli on September 11, 2012. The role was specifically created for him after he expressed his love for the show and met with Katims on the set of Friday Night Lights.

=== Filming ===
Production for the first season began in 2009 with Katims as executive producer, serving as showrunner and head writer; he also directed a few episodes later in the series. The pilot episode was filmed in Northern California, using local crews, while the rest of the series was filmed in Los Angeles.

As in Katims's other show, Friday Night Lights, three cameras were used for shooting, placed at both sides of a scene. There usually were no table reads prior to the filming of an episode, a process often used in other television shows.

=== Broadcast history ===
In the aftermath of Maura Tierney's departure, the premiere date that was originally set for September 23, 2009, was moved to March 1, 2010, at 9:00 p.m., but it was again delayed to the following day at 10:00 p.m. in the aftermath of The Jay Leno Show cancellation and 2010 Tonight Show conflict, requiring the return of scripted programming to the later time slot. The series premiered on March 2, 2010, at 10:00 p.m., on NBC, following The Biggest Loser. The series premiere was dedicated to the memory of Nora O'Brien, a vice president at NBC, who died on the set of Parenthood on April 29, 2009, after collapsing from an aneurysm.

In April 2010, Parenthood was renewed for a second season by NBC. The second season premiered September 14, 2010. Later that year in November, it was announced that Parenthood would be moving to Mondays at 10:00 pm beginning March 7. However, due to an overhaul of NBC's Law & Order: Los Angeles putting the show on an indefinite hiatus, the network announced in January 2011, that Parenthood would remain in the Tuesday 10:00 pm time slot.

In May 2011, Parenthood was renewed for a third season and premiered at 10:00 p.m. on September 13. In May 2012, NBC renewed Parenthood for a 15-episode fourth season. In April 2013, NBC renewed Parenthood for a fifth season, with 22 episodes. On May 11, 2014, NBC renewed Parenthood for a sixth and final season, with 13 episodes, after a stand-off with the cast which has seen their episode guarantee reduced.

The series aired in cable syndication on NickMom in 2015. The rights were acquired by Up TV in 2016, where the series debuted on May 30 of that year. Parenthood was available for streaming on Netflix in the United States from 2011 to 2019. It returned to Netflix in select regions in June 2024.

In August 2016, Katims was interviewed by TVLine about a potential revival of the series. He said:

"It would start at the moment when I feel like I have a story to tell", he admitted. "But the whole thing about Parenthood is the kids get a little older and their lives change and then there's more story to tell. I feel like that will happen at some point. And then it will be a question of, logistically, can we get the actors [back together] at the same time? And then we have to [find an outlet] that wants to [air] it."

== Soundtracks ==
Parenthood (Original Television Soundtrack)

Soundtrack album by Various Artists
- Released: August 31, 2010 (Digital), October 5, 2010 (CD)
- Genre: Folk-pop
- Label: Arrival Records / Scion Music Group

On August 31, 2010, Arrival Records/Scion Music Group released a soundtrack for the first season of Parenthood. The soundtrack consists of 10 songs including the theme song for Parenthood, "Forever Young" by Bob Dylan, and the international theme, "When We Were Young" by Lucy Schwartz. The soundtrack also includes a cover of "Forever Young" performed by John Doe and Lucy Schwartz.

Andrew McMahon, of the band Jack's Mannequin, revealed in speaking about the band's album People and Things that the song "Casting Lines" was written after he was contacted by producers of the show as a possible theme song for the series. After recording the song and sending it to producers, he was told they appreciated his efforts but they had selected "Forever Young" as the show's theme song. The song does appear on Jack's Mannequin's third album, People and Things.

Track listing

1. "Forever Young" – Bob Dylan
2. "Darlin' Do Not Fear" – Brett Dennen
3. "Colors" – Amos Lee
4. "Kick Drum Heart" – The Avett Brothers
5. "Put Your Records On" – Corinne Bailey Rae
6. "In My Dreams" – Eels
7. "Change of Time" – Josh Ritter
8. "When We Were Young" – Lucy Schwartz
9. "In These Arms" – The Swell Season
10. "Solitaire" – Wilco
11. "Let It Be Me" – Ray LaMontagne
12. "Forever Young" – John Doe and Lucy Schwartz

Parenthood (Original Television Soundtrack), Vol. 2

Soundtrack album by Various Artists
- Released: October 8, 2013
- Genre: Pop
- Label: J-2 Music

A second soundtrack was released on October 8, 2013, through J-2 Music. It was produced by Jason Katims and Liza Richardson among others and features songs heard from the second to the fourth season.

Track listing

1. "Dance in the Graveyards" – Delta Rae
2. "If I Had a Boat" – Lyle Lovett
3. "Piece Of My Heart" (Live Recording) – CeeLo Green
4. "What I Wouldn't Do" – A Fine Frenzy
5. "Man on Fire (Little Daylight Remix)" – Edward Sharpe and the Magnetic Zeros
6. "Honey I'll Try" – Emile Millar
7. "Take a Bow" – Greg Laswell
8. "Hard Times (Come Again No More)" – Brett Dennen
9. "Lady Adelaide" – Benjamin Gibbard
10. "My My Love" – Joshua Radin
11. "High Hope" – Glen Hansard

== Reception ==
=== Critical response ===
Parenthood's first season received generally positive reviews from critics, scoring a 61 out of 100 based on 29 reviews on the review aggregator Metacritic. On Rotten Tomatoes, the season has a score of 63% based on 30 reviews, with a critics consensus of: "Parenthood is a warm and engaging show that sometimes succumbs to the chaos of its cast." Alessandra Stanley of The New York Times said Parenthood is "unexpectedly compelling" despite being reminiscent of Brothers & Sisters. She praised the writing and the cast and described the show as "a coming-of-age drama for all ages". Alan Sepinwall, writing for The Star-Ledger in Newark, wrote that "Like the movie that inspired it, Parenthood isn't an instant classic, but it's smart and warm and knowing, and it casts its net so wide that at least part of it should connect with you." Ken Tucker of Entertainment Weekly wrote, "Parenthood isn't better than Modern Family, but it's different—it's its own creation, thanks to the deft touch and careful characterizations developed by executive producer Jason Katims and his writers."

For the second season, Rotten Tomatoes reported a 91% approval rating based on 11 reviews, with a critics consensus of: "In Parenthood's second season, the eclectic cast hits its collective stride as the Bravermans face new family challenges and achievements in an increasingly convincing and relatable way." Tucker of Entertainment Weekly wrote: "As the series has proceeded, what initially looked like a bunch of talented but disparate actors has cohered into a believable clan." The Huffington Post's Maureen Ryan called it a "solidly rewarding drama" which is "something to treasure on the TV schedule". Parenthood was furthermore praised for the way it tackles Asperger's. The moment during which Kristina and Adam explain to Max he has the syndrome was listed in TV Guide's Top TV Moments of 2011.

For the third season, Rotten Tomatoes reported a 100% approval rating based on 13 reviews, with a critics consensus of: "Messy, moody, and unconditionally lovable, Parenthood's third season perfectly embodies the traits that make the Braverman family so relatable and endlessly watchable." The New Yorker writer Emily Nussbaum noted the show's positive development saying that it "has become stronger with each season". She deemed Parenthood one of only two great dramas on network television next to The Good Wife and cited its ability to be warm and sentimental without being dumb as one of its strengths. Sheri Levine of The Vancouver Sun wrote, "The cast moves effortlessly from providing serious, thoughtful answers to cracking jokes and allowing the funny moments to shine through. It's almost as though art is imitating life, or life imitating art." TIME magazine columnist James Poniewozik wrote that the show's "third and fourth seasons have elevated it to one of TV's best because of how it has hit a memorable theme from FNL: the idea of how community can be, inseparably, both a burden and indispensable support."

For the fourth season, Rotten Tomatoes reported a 90% approval rating based on 21 reviews, with a critics consensus of: "Four seasons in, Parenthood continues to evolve its characters by pushing them into challenging, interesting new places." The Washington Post TV columnist Jen Chaney called the show "a perfect piece of 'reali-scapism': A television show that tackles subjects many of us confront in our own lives and dips all of it in just enough escapism to make it enjoyable to watch." Rachel Stein of Television Without Pity felt that the show "possesses the same family bonding that Lorelai and Rory [of Gilmore Girls] had (times 18 for every member of this family), each episode has a lot of purposeful quirk and there's a certain quaintness about life that it captures in the Braverman clan." The season was listed as one of the 10 best seasons of television in 2012 in several publications, including the Cleveland Plain Dealer, the Contra Costa Times, The Daily Beast, HitFix, Salon.com, the St. Louis Post-Dispatch, TIME magazine, and TV Guide. Writing for The Daily Beast, Jace Lacob highlighted Monica Potter's "breathtaking" performance, whose cancer storyline was "poignant" and "gripping". Alan Sepinwall from HitFix commented: "this season's cancer storyline has brought a lot of what the show does well into even sharper focus, raising the stakes of almost every storyline in the process, and delivering fantastic, honestly tear-jerking performances."

For the fifth season, Rotten Tomatoes reported a 92% approval rating based on 12 reviews, with a critics consensus of: "Parenthood will leave viewers in tears with a fifth season that frankly engages with the tribulations of family, further cementing its claim as an exemplar of the genre." For the sixth season, Rotten Tomatoes reported a 95% approval rating based on 19 reviews, with a critics consensus of: "Parenthood remains a top-notch family drama in its sixth and final season, thoughtfully portraying its complex and compelling characters and the enduring power of resilience."

=== Ratings ===
Season	Time slot (ET)	Episodes	Season premiere		Season finale		TV season	Rank	Viewers (in millions)
Season	Time slot (ET)	Episodes	Date	Viewers (in millions)	Date	Viewers (in millions)	TV season	Rank	Viewers (in millions)
1	Tuesday 10:00 pm	13	March 2, 2010	8.10	May 25, 2010	6.04	2009–10	71	6.39
2	Tuesday 10:00 pm	22	September 14, 2010	7.60	April 19, 2011	6.32	2010–11	77	6.87
3	Tuesday 10:00 pm	18	September 13, 2011	6.29	February 28, 2012	5.16	2011–12	76	6.57
4	Tuesday 10:00 pm	15	September 11, 2012	5.48	January 22, 2013	4.87	2012–13	57	7.09
5	Thursday 10:00 pm	22	September 26, 2013	5.06	April 17, 2014	3.99	2013–14	71	6.36
6	Thursday 10:00 pm	13	September 25, 2014	4.26	January 29, 2015	5.46	2014–15	84	6.72

== Accolades ==
Year	Awards group	Category	Recipient	Result
2010	Casting Society of America	Outstanding Achievement in Casting - Television Pilot - Drama	Carrie Audino, Laura Schiff and Nina Henninger	Nominated
2010	Teen Choice Awards	Choice TV: Female Breakout Star	Mae Whitman	Nominated
2010	Teen Choice Awards	Choice TV: Parental Unit	Lauren Graham	Nominated
2010	Television Academy Honors	Television with a Conscience		Won
2011	ALMA Awards	Favorite TV Actress - Supporting Role	Sarah Ramos	Nominated
2012	ALMA Awards	Favorite TV Actress - Supporting Role	Sarah Ramos	Nominated
2012	NAACP Image Award	Outstanding Directing in a Dramatic Series	Ken Whittingham	Nominated
2012	Young Artist Awards	Best Performance in a TV series - Supporting Young Actor	Max Burkholder	Nominated
2012	Young Artist Awards	Best Performance in a TV series - Guest Starring Young Actor 18-21	Max Ehrich	Nominated
2012	Humanitas Prize	60 Minute Category	Episode "Remember Me, I'm The One Who Loves You" (written by Kerry Ehrin)	Nominated
2012	NAMIC Vision Awards	Best Drama		Won
2012	PRISM Awards	Drama Series Episode – Substance Use	Episode "Damage Control"	Won
2012	PRISM Awards	Male Performance in a Drama Series Multi-Episode Storyline	Craig T. Nelson	Won
2012	PRISM Awards	Drama Series Multi-Episode Storyline – Mental Health	Max's Asperger's	Won
2012	PRISM Awards	Performance in a Drama Episode	Lauren Graham	Nominated
2012	Primetime Emmy Awards	Guest Actor in a Drama Series	Jason Ritter	Nominated
2013	NAACP Image Award	Outstanding Supporting Actress in a Drama Series	Joy Bryant	Nominated
2013	Television Academy Honors	Television with a Conscience		Won
2013	Young Artist Awards	Best Performance in a TV Series - Leading Young Actress	Savannah Paige Rae	Won
2013	Young Artist Awards	Best Performance in a TV Series - Supporting Young Actor	Tyree Brown	Won
2013	Critics' Choice Television Awards	Best Supporting Actress in a Drama Series	Monica Potter	Won
2013	Television Critics Association	Individual Achievement in Drama	Monica Potter	Nominated
2013	People's Choice Awards	Favorite Network TV Drama		Nominated
2013	Golden Globe Awards	Golden Globe Award for Best Supporting Actress – Series, Miniseries or Television Film	Monica Potter	Nominated
2014	Young Artist Awards	Best Performance in a TV Series - Supporting Young Actor	Tyree Brown	Nominated
2014	Young Artist Awards	Best Performance in a TV Series - Supporting Young Actor	Max Burkholder	Won
2014	Young Artist Awards	Best Performance in a TV Series - Supporting Young Actor	Xolo Mariduena	Nominated
2014	Young Artist Awards	Best Performance in a TV Series - Supporting Young Actress	Savannah Paige Rae	Nominated
2014	Young Artist Awards	Outstanding Young Ensemble in a TV Series	Savannah Paige Rae, Tyree Brown, Max Burkholder, Xolo Maridueña	Won
2015	Gracie Awards	Outstanding Female Actor in a Breakthrough Role	Mae Whitman	Won
2015	NAMIC Vision Awards	Outstanding Drama	Episode "The Pontiac"	Nominated
2015	5th Critics' Choice Television Awards	Best Supporting Actress in a Drama Series	Mae Whitman	Nominated
2015	5th Critics' Choice Television Awards	Best Supporting Actor in a Drama Series	Craig T. Nelson	Nominated

== Home media ==
The complete series was released on Blu-ray on June 13, 2023.

DVD name	Region 1 release date	Region 2 release date	Region 4 release date	Ep #	Discs	Additional information
Season 1	August 31, 2010	July 11, 2011	December 1, 2010	13	3	Deleted scenes, Extended episodes, Episode commentary with Executive Producer Jason Katims and "Get To Know Your Parents" featurette
Season 2	August 30, 2011	TBA	September 7, 2011	22	5	Featurette: From Page to Screen, Deleted Scenes, Audio Commentaries
Season 3	August 7, 2012	TBA	October 3, 2012	18	4	Deleted storyline featuring Drew, Deleted scenes, Audio commentary on two episodes
Season 4	August 20, 2013	TBA	September 5, 2013	15	3	
Season 5	August 19, 2014	TBA	September 4, 2014	22	5	
Season 6	May 5, 2015	TBA	September 3, 2015	13	3	Three "Farewell: A Parenthood Retrospective" featurettes: The Braverman Siblings, On Making Parenthood, Reflections on Parenthood
The Complete Series	May 5, 2015	August 10, 2015	TBA	103	23	

== Italian adaptation ==
In December 2015 an adaptation of Parenthood entitled Tutto può succedere (Anything Can Happen) began broadcasting on the Italian state TV channel RaiUno. The plot follows the fortunes of the Ferraro family, based in various locations in and around Rome. Principal actors include Giorgio Colangeli as father/grandfather Ettore Ferraro, Licia Maglietta as mother/grandmother Emma and Maya Sansa as daughter/mother Sara.
