= Goliath (TV series) =

American legal drama television series

- Genre: Legal drama
- Created by: David E. Kelley; Jonathan Shapiro
- Starring: Billy Bob Thornton; William Hurt; Maria Bello; Olivia Thirlby; Nina Arianda; Molly Parker; Tania Raymonde; Sarah Wynter; Britain Dalton; Diana Hopper; Ana de la Reguera; Matthew Del Negro; Morris Chestnut; Mark Duplass; Dennis Quaid; Amy Brenneman; Beau Bridges; Shamier Anderson; Graham Greene; Julia Jones; J. K. Simmons; Jena Malone; Lenora Crichlow; Brandon Scott; Geoffrey Arend; Bruce Dern; Clara Wong
- Opening theme: "Bartholomew" by The Silent Comedy (season 1)
- Composers: Jon Ehrlich; Jason Derlatka
- Country of origin: United States
- Original language: English
- No. of seasons: 4
- No. of episodes: 32

Production
- Executive producers: David E. Kelley; Jonathan Shapiro; David Semel; Ross Fineman; Lawrence Trilling; Clyde Phillips (season 2)
- Producer: Robert Lloyd Lewis
- Cinematography: Edward Pei
- Editor: John David Buxton
- Running time: 38–60 minutes
- Production companies: David E. Kelley Productions; Jonathan Shapiro Productions; Amazon Studios

Original release
- Network: Amazon Prime Video
- Release: October 13, 2016 – September 24, 2021

Goliath is an American legal drama television series created by David E. Kelley and Jonathan Shapiro. It ran for four eight-episode seasons from 2016 to 2021 on Amazon Prime Video.

== Cast ==
=== Main ===
- Billy Bob Thornton as Billy McBride: formerly a brilliant and personable lawyer who founded the law firm Cooperman McBride with Donald Cooperman, and with whom he built it to be a successful legal firm. He walked out of the firm and became an alcoholic after a murder suspect he got acquitted on a technicality went on to kill an entire family. He lives in an extended-stay hotel (the Ocean Lodge Hotel) by the Santa Monica Pier. McBride is also a graduate of the University of California Berkeley School of Law and Indiana University.
- Nina Arianda as Patty Solis-Papagian: a DUI lawyer and real estate agent, who brings Rachel Kennedy's case to McBride.
- Tania Raymonde as Brittany Gold: a prostitute who cares about Billy McBride and sometimes works as his legal assistant.
- Diana Hopper as Denise McBride (recurring season 1, main seasons 2–4): 16-year-old daughter of Billy and his ex-wife Michelle.
- William Hurt as Donald Cooperman: McBride's partner in founding Cooperman McBride (main, season 1; recurring, seasons 3–4). Cooperman is disfigured with facial burns and lives as a recluse: he rarely leaves his office, and most people at the firm have never seen him. He monitors meetings and depositions remotely by cameras. Without the staff's knowledge, he has the entire office bugged, giving him access to everything that happens. He holds a grudge against McBride.

==== Season 1 main cast ====
- Maria Bello as Michelle McBride: Billy's ex-wife and a partner at Cooperman McBride. She is angry with McBride, but respects his legal skills and is still fond of him.
- Olivia Thirlby as Lucy Kittridge: a young associate at Cooperman McBride whom Cooperman installs on the Larson case.
- Molly Parker as Callie Senate: a senior lawyer at the firm who previously used a relationship with Cooperman to advance her career.
- Sarah Wynter as Gina Larson: the widow of Ryan Larson (who worked at Borns Technology, one of Cooperman McBride's biggest clients, and purportedly committed suicide by blowing himself up on a boat).
- Britain Dalton as Jason Larson: Ryan and Gina's son. He eventually becomes the plaintiff in the case.

==== Season 2 main cast ====
- Ana de la Reguera as Marisol Silva, a city councilwoman from East Los Angeles, in the race to be the first Latina mayor of Los Angeles (Seasons 2, 3).
- Matthew Del Negro as Danny Loomis, a charismatic yet devious political operative and consigliere to the city's power elite under the guise of being a "financial analyst".
- Morris Chestnut as Deputy District Attorney Hakeem Rashad, who was on the losing side of Billy's last criminal case and has a bitter, old grudge against him.
- Mark Duplass as Tom Wyatt, a successful Los Angeles developer who wants to give the city a distinct skyline. A prominent philanthropist, he is a major contributor to mayoral candidate Marisol Silva. (Season 2, guest Season 3)

==== Season 3 main cast ====
- Dennis Quaid as Wade Blackwood, President of Blackwood Almonds.
- Amy Brenneman as Diana Blackwood, Wade's sister and CEO of Blackwood Almonds, and Fer-de-Lance.
- Beau Bridges as Roy Wheeler, Wade Blackwood's business partner.
- Shamier Anderson as Anton/Dario, Diana Blackwood's adopted sons.
- Graham Greene as Littlecrow, owner of the Casino in Blackwood County that serves as the primary set of Season 3.
- Julia Jones as Stephanie.

==== Season 4 main cast ====
- J. K. Simmons as George Zax, a ruthless pharmaceutical company executive
- Jena Malone as Samantha Margolis, the daughter of the founder and current managing partner of Margolis-True, the law firm Billy joins to help settle a high-profile pharmaceutical lawsuit.
- Lenora Crichlow as Ava Wallace-Margolis, wife of the founder and name partner of Margolis-True.
- Brandon Scott as Robert Bettencourt, a lawyer at Margolis-True working on the pharmaceutical lawsuits; he was once engaged to Samantha.
- Geoffrey Arend as Griffin Petock, the attorney for the parties to Tom True's lawsuit: Zax Pharma, Tillinger Health and Russell Drug.
- Bruce Dern as Frank Zax, former partner of Zax Pharma who was forced out by his brother George Zax after a disagreement over a key product.
- Clara Wong as Kate Zax, daughter of Frank Zax and niece of George, she is a chemist at Zax Pharma who has concerns over the long-term adverse effects of the company's flagship product.

=== Recurring ===
- Julie Brister as Marva Jefferson: Billy's legal assistant. (Recurring Seasons 1–2, main Seasons 3–4)

==== Season 1 recurring cast ====
- Damon Gupton as Leonard Letts: Corporate counsel to Borns Tech.
- Dwight Yoakam as Wendell Corey: CEO of Borns Tech.
- Harold Perrineau as Judge Roston Keller: The presiding judge on the Larson case.
- Ever Carradine as Rachel Kennedy: Ryan's sister, and the initial plaintiff in the wrongful death case against Borns Tech.
- Kevin Weisman as Ned Berring: A former employee at Borns Tech and a key witness in the case.
- Jason Ritter as FBI Agent Farley.
- Patrick Robert Smith as Officer Ezekiel Sanders
- Rigo Sanchez as Karl Stoltz
- Julia Cho as Jade Matizu
- Juan Gabriel Pareja as Gabriel Marquez
- T.W. Leshner as Alan Rubin
- Jorge Luis Pallo as Alejandro Marquez
- Gilbert Owuor as Father Anan

==== Season 2 recurring cast ====
- Lou Diamond Phillips as Oscar Suarez, who works at Chez Jay, whose son Julio is falsely accused of murder.
- Diego Josef as Julio Suarez, the son of Oscar, who is falsely accused of murder.
- Dominic Fumusa as Detective Keith Roman: An LAPD detective involved in the conspiracy. Roman blames Billy for getting a killer off who then went on to murder a family a few years ago.
- Paul Williams as J.T. Reginald, a former colleague of Billy's with extensive contacts, who left his legal practice following the execution of a client. (season 2, 3)
- James Wolk as FBI Special Agent Jeff Clayton, who agrees to help Billy hunt down his prime suspect in the Marcos Pena murder.
- Alexandra Billings as Judge Martha Wallace, the judge in the Pena murder case, and a former prosecutor who has history with both Billy and J.T.
- Manuel Garcia-Rulfo as Gabriel Ortega, a powerful drug lord behind the murder conspiracy; he has childhood connections to Marisol.
- David Cross as Pete "The Broker" Oakland, a real estate agent who helps Tom Wyatt with some dirty business (Recurring Season 2, Guest Season 3)
- Annika Marks as Mary Roman.
- JC Gonzalez as DJ Diego Spiz.
- Zachary James Rukavina as Miguel
- Paul Ben-Victor as Cleft Chin (Recurring Season 2, Guest Season 3)
- John Savage as Mickey
- Steven Bauer as Willie

==== Season 3 recurring cast ====
- Sherilyn Fenn as Bobbi
- Griffin Dunne as Gene (Recurring Season 3, Guest Season 4)
- Illeana Douglas as Rita
- Lauren Tom as Janet (Guest Season 2,4, Recurring Season 3)
- Shelby Rabara as Sumi Sen
- Googy Gress as Judge Boyd Paxton
- Marissa Echeveria as Violet Webster
- Leslie Grossman as Rochelle Purple
- David Sullivan as Spencer Jackson

==== Season 4 recurring cast ====
- Elias Koteas as Tom True, partner in Margolis-True and the father of Amanda True, a teenaged victim of opioid abuse
- Emma Kennedy as Amanda True, Tom True's daughter
- Obba Babatundé as Ivan Tillinger, owner of Tillinger Health, a party to Tom True's lawsuit
- Haley Joel Osment as Dylan Zax, the son of George Zax and an heir apparent to Zax Pharma
- Robert Patrick as Coach, Billy's father
- Beth Grant as Judge Meredith Caplan Reiss
- Anna Jacoby-Heron as Casey Lukin, Patty's half-sister
- Greg Grunberg as Greg Wetzel
- Raymond Ma as Dr. Ming
- Monica Potter as Christina Lukin (Guest Season 3, Recurring Season 4), Patty's birth mother
- Lynda Kay Parker as Lynda Kay
- Christina Kirk as Fern Potter

== Episodes ==
| Season | Episodes | Originally released |
|---|---|---|
| 1 | 8 | October 13, 2016 |
| 2 | 8 | June 15, 2018 |
| 3 | 8 | October 4, 2019 |
| 4 | 8 | September 24, 2021 |

=== Season 1 (2016) ===
| No. overall | No. in season | Title | Directed by | Written by | Original release date |
|---|---|---|---|---|---|
| 1 | 1 | "Of Mice and Men" | Lawrence Trilling | David E. Kelley & Jonathan Shapiro | October 13, 2016 |
Lawyer Patty Solis-Papagian tries to convince washed-up, alcoholic lawyer Billy McBride to represent her neighbor Rachel Kennedy on a small case involving Borns Technology. Borns Tec is one of the biggest clients of Cooperman McBride, the successful firm Billy helped found alongside lawyer Donald Cooperman. Rachel's brother Ryan Larson is said to have committed suicide by blowing up a boat that belonged to his employer Borns Tech. Not believing this story, Rachel wishes to sue them for wrongful death. Billy agrees to take the case and visits Ryan's widow Gina and son Jason. However, Gina does not agree with Rachel's suspicions. Billy later finds two fishermen who witnessed the explosion that killed Ryan. Cooperman anticipates that Billy will file a wrongful death lawsuit and asks to have someone at the firm start drafting a response. Billy asks prostitute Brittany Gold to work as his legal assistant. When Billy files the lawsuit, Cooperman insists that Callie Senate, a senior lawyer at Cooperman McBride, argue for the dismissal of the case in court. Billy is eventually assaulted by a cop and comes to in lockup. Billy is also being stalked by a man in black.
| 2 | 2 | "Pride and Prejudice" | Alik Sakharov | Jonathan Shapiro & David E. Kelley | October 13, 2016 |
Billy is released from lockup the next morning and rushes to the courthouse, where the judge has already dismissed the case in his absence. Cooperman decides to counter-sue Billy for malicious prosecution. Billy visits Rachel to apologize and to take up the case again, but she turns him away. The stalker visits the fishermen to learn what they told Billy. Billy asks a court clerk to help him get his case back up before the judge in the state court refiles the case in federal court under the High Seas act, and convinces Patty to help him get Rachel back on board. Cooperman is revealed to be spying on his employees, including junior associate Lucy Kittridge, who is tasked with drafting the countersuit as well as the motion to dismiss the new case. Rachel visits Gina, who reminds her that Ryan left a suicide note. The case is mysteriously dismissed from federal court but gets reinstated to the state court. Leonard Letts, general counsel for Borns Tech, learns that Ryan used to work on a top-secret project. The case goes up before Judge Keller, who attempts to dismiss it. Billy bad-mouths the judge, who holds him in contempt, thereby entitling him to a hearing on the matter. As they leave the court, Rachel is run over by a speeding van.
| 3 | 3 | "Game On" | Bill D'Elia | Jonathan Shapiro & David E. Kelley | October 13, 2016 |
The man in black is hinted to have been responsible for Rachel's death. Gina chases Billy and Patty away from Rachel's funeral, but not before Billy talks to Jason. After meeting Cooperman, Judge Keller vacates the contempt charge to avoid the hearing Billy is entitled to. Billy refiles the suit with Jason as his new client. Patty convinces Judge Keller to appoint her as Jason's legal guardian, allowing Billy to remain as the attorney on the case. Judge Keller deems the case a complex one, which should be settled through arbitration under the guidance of a complex litigation manager, which he happens to be. When the parties cannot reach a consensus, the judge asks Billy to present more substantial evidence the next day if he wants the case not to be dismissed. Billy visits the fishermen, and gets a video of Ryan's boat exploding and pieces of shrapnel from it. Using a fake job offer as bait, the team finds Ned Berring, a former Borns Tech employee, who identifies the shrapnel as part of a bomb that should never have been anywhere near civilian areas. In light of the evidence presented by Billy, and given that Callie and Letts cannot refute or explain any of this evidence, Keller decides to allow the lawsuit to proceed.
| 4 | 4 | "It's Donald" | Alik Sakharov | Jonathan Shapiro | October 13, 2016 |
Cooperman and Callie head to Borns Tech to find out exactly what this case involves. Letts, who now knows why the case cannot be settled, tells Callie that Ryan was working on developing military-grade fuel for missile propulsion systems and that he used this fuel to commit suicide. This fact was not disclosed until now because the company did not have federal approval to test the fuel. Any legal settlement would need to be reported to the Pentagon and would result in voiding their defense research contract, which is why settling is not an option. Callie agrees to Billy's demand of an expedited discovery process but demands that he disclose the identity of his whistle-blower. Gina shows Billy and Patty Ryan's suicide letter. Cooperman makes Lucy first chair. Brittany visits the pastor, pretending that she is suicidal, and is referred to a counselor. The team is delivered a truckload of documents as part of discovery. The man in black lures the fishermen into a drug deal and gets them captured by the DEA, tarnishing their credibility. Billy walks in on Callie and another one of Cooperman McBride's senior lawyers, Michelle (Billy's ex-wife). Lucy finally meets her boss when Cooperman lures her into the office, and the two begin a relationship.
| 5 | 5 | "Cover Your Ass" | Anthony Hemingway | Jonathan Shapiro | October 13, 2016 |
The man in black continues his plan by informing the DEA that Billy organized the drug shipment the fishermen were caught with. Billy visits the fishermen in jail. Billy issues Nicole, Cooperman's long-time secretary, a subpoena. Cooperman tears up the subpoena and tells her to consider it quashed. Billy gets under Lucy's skin at the deposition, forcing Letts to block Cooperman out and ask Callie to take over. Callie dismantles Ned's testimony using evidence of illegal behavior on his behalf. Afterward, Callie serves Billy a restraining order which bans him from entering Michelle's house. Comparing the suicide notes Ryan left at work and at home, Billy finds a reference to a time capsule Jason buried as part of a school project. The man in black confronts Lucy and asks her to tell Cooperman to return his calls. Inside the capsule, the team finds a model for a missile that Ryan claims to have been working on and which Ned claims to be a weapon of mass destruction. Billy asks the pastor to testify at the trial. However, the pastor says that he has been dismissed from the clergy for revealing Ryan's confessional secrets to Billy. Borns Tech CEO Wendell Corey and Cooperman discuss the time capsule Billy has dug up.
| 6 | 6 | "Line of Fire" | Lawrence Trilling | Jonathan Shapiro | October 13, 2016 |
Lucy mentions the visit of the man in black to Cooperman, and reveals that his name is Karl Stoltz, but Cooperman denies knowing him. Brittany helps Billy blackmail the cop who assaulted him, and mentions that the cop knows something. The depositions on the Larson case continue, and Gina and Jason crack under questioning. Someone breaks into the storage locker containing the discovery documents and turns the place upside down. Billy goes to judge Keller with the time capsule, and lists the reasons why he should take custody of this piece of evidence. The cop is served a subpoena after telling Billy that he was working for Stoltz. Billy takes what he knows about Stoltz and Borns Tech to the FBI and the US Attorney's office, but is blocked by red tape. Wendell and Cooperman get Letts on board by threatening to fire him. The FBI agent he met with gives Billy a file on Stoltz. Billy serves Cooperman a subpoena. As he drives back home, Billy is nearly driven off the road by a black truck. Suspicious, Billy opens his trunk to find Stoltz bloody and dying.
| 7 | 7 | "Beauty and the Beast" | Lawrence Trilling | Jonathan Shapiro & David E. Kelley | October 13, 2016 |
Billy informs the LAPD of Stoltz's corpse, and is allowed to leave since they do not have any evidence to charge him with the murder. Lucy's stutter returns during a meeting of the defense team. Cooperman removes her from the trial and breaks up with her. Michelle breaks up with Callie. Brittany is pulled over and assaulted by the cop she helped blackmail. During a status hearing, Keller berates Billy for his lack of progress. Billy decides to move right on to the trial. As the trial begins, Patty puts Gina on the stand, but Callie discredits her by making her admit to an affair. Billy's FBI friend gives him images of the destruction caused by the munitions based on Ryan Larson's model, but Keller disallows them because they lack foundation and are prejudicial. Ned testifies to Borns Tech's design and manufacture of cluster bombs. However, Callie makes him admit that the cluster bomb model and blueprints found in the time capsule did not have the Borns Tech name or logo on them, and could have been made by anyone. Callie fires Lucy on behalf of Cooperman, saying that she will never be a successful trial lawyer. Billy puts one of the fishermen on the stand and gets him to recount his witnessing of the explosion, but is not allowed to elicit testimony regarding Stoltz. Billy decides to put Corey on the stand, and leads him to name Cooperman as the only man who can answer several of Billy's questions. Billy asks that Cooperman be made to testify. Callie visits Billy to give him her witness list, which has only a single name on it: Brittany.
| 8 | 8 | "Citizens United" | Lawrence Trilling | Jonathan Shapiro & David E. Kelley | October 13, 2016 |
Billy confronts Brittany who says that she did not have a choice but to testify. Michelle suspects that Cooperman had puppeteered Corey's responses, thereby making sure that he himself would be called to the stand. Billy grills Cooperman regarding his knowledge of Karl Stoltz, which he states can be proved by Lucy's testimony. After vehement denials, Cooperman seems to lose touch with his surroundings, before collapsing due to a stroke. Since the defense cannot cross-examine Cooperman, his testimony is considered inadmissible. Callie puts Brittany on the stand and makes her admit that she helped Billy blackmail a cop. The jury returns after deliberations with a verdict that Borns Tech was responsible for and tried to cover up Ryan Larson's death, and awards damages to the tune of $162.1 million. The defense team tries to negotiate with Billy for a lower settlement, and to avoid admitting guilt, in return for paying up immediately and waiving all rights to appeals. Corey admits to Billy that Ryan died in an accident while disposing of illegal fuel the company was not supposed to have. Given this admission, Billy settles for $50 million paid immediately. Billy, who has also secretly recorded Corey's admission, turns the recording over to the FBI. Cooperman, who has been paralyzed by his stroke, is asked to retire. Michelle fires Callie, who is revealed to have been behind Corey implicating Cooperman in his testimony. The FBI raids Borns Tech, while Corey is arrested as he is about to leave the country. Billy goes to the hospital to visit Cooperman, who reveals that Rachel's death was truly an accident: the one they were trying to kill was Billy.

=== Season 2 (2018) ===
| No. overall | No. in season | Title | Directed by | Written by | Original release date |
|---|---|---|---|---|---|
| 9 | 1 | "La Mano" | Lawrence Trilling | Ben Myer | June 15, 2018 |
Mayoral candidate Marisol Silva is pressing the LAPD and the DEA to be tough on gangs and cartels. Oscar, who works at Billy's regular bar Chez Jay, comes to Billy because his son Julio has been arrested for a gangland killing he did not commit. Brittany visits Billy to apologize to him. Billy visits Julio to make sure he is adequately represented. Denise (Michelle and Billy's 16-year-old daughter) returns from visiting her mother, who now lives in London. Marisol visits Billy and reveals that she is a friend of Oscar and Julio, and asks him to continue checking up on Julio. Billy asks Detective Roman, a friend of his at the LAPD, to walk him through the crime scene of the double homicide, but immediately starts noticing holes in the official story. Roman is later seen discussing the case with Danny Loomis, and it is clear there is something shady afoot. Danny recognizes Julio on one of Marisol's campaign billboards, and asks Tom Wyatt to tell her to distance herself from the kid. On the way to court to testify to Julio's alibi, Oscar is shot down in broad daylight by unknown assailants.
| 10 | 2 | "Politics" | Lawrence Trilling | Noelle Valdivia and Tony Saltzman | June 15, 2018 |
In a flashback, Tom is revealed to have met Hunter Friedman, one of the murder victims along with Marcos Pena, while visiting a real estate broker. Tom, Danny, and the broker discuss killing some of the members of their operation, including Hunter, leading to the murders that Julio is arrested for. Billy breaks the news to Julio and agrees to take his case. Brittany returns to work for Billy. He visits Patty to recruit her for the case, and she reluctantly agrees. At the preliminary hearing, the prosecution is able to present CCTV footage of a gun-toting Julio at the crime scene. Billy is angry at Julio for lying about his alibi, but Julio admits that he had gone to Marcos's home to kill him, but ran away when he heard gunshots. He claims that the murderer was a short Hispanic guy, who is later seen being paid for the hit by Roman. Billy visits JT, an old friend of his, and gets his help in looking for the real murderer. After telling the media that she believes in Julio's innocence, Marisol visits Billy. Gabriel Ortega, head of the La Mano cartel, threatens Tom and demands that he make sure that Julio is convicted without attracting any more attention. Hakeem Rashad, the prosecutor on the case, offers Billy a plea of voluntary manslaughter, but Billy is adamant that Julio is innocent. Marisol has a cello delivered to Julio in jail. Tom and Danny tell Marisol that they had Hunter killed, and that she is involved in this because of some information she had passed them about the DEA raids. Marisol seeks out Billy in her distress, but does not tell him what is bothering her.
| 11 | 3 | "Fresh Flowers" | Dennie Gordon | Jennifer Ames and Steve Turner & Marisa Wegrzyn | June 15, 2018 |
Julio's brothers are murdered in a flashback; he finds a gun on one of them and keeps it. JT identifies the murderer of Marcos and Hunter as Tito Garcia, and tells Billy how to find him. Billy uses JT and judge Martha Wallace's past history to get the judge to allow him to depose Tito at the preliminary hearing. When Billy and Patty ask Roman to help them find Tito, he refuses, and threatens Patty. Billy finds Tito, but Roman has Tito arrested and deported by ICE before they can talk. Billy asks Agent Clayton at the FBI for help finding Tito. Marisol keeps avoiding Tom and refuses to back down from supporting Julio. Clayton tells Billy that they have Tito; Billy lets Marisol know, and she tells Tom and Danny. Danny has Gabriel assassinate Tito. The cops find the murder weapon near Julio's house. Patty tells Julio about the plea deal; he tells her that the gun from the video was his brother's, and that it is currently with his girlfriend. Tom stalks Brittany.
| 12 | 4 | "Alo" | Dennie Gordon | Noelle Valdivia and Tony Saltzman | June 15, 2018 |
Gabriel demonstrates his punishment technique of forced amputation. Using the gun from Julio's girlfriend, Billy manages to get the judge to have a hearing to discuss the suppression of the second gun and the video as evidence. Tom starts getting closer to Brittany. A box containing Tito's head is delivered to Billy; Billy takes it to Roman and threatens him, and gets locked up. Roman's odd behavior starts worrying his wife Mary, as well as Danny. Billy rattles Roman at the suppression hearing. Gabriel tells Tom to have Julio commit suicide and leave a note, and to keep Marisol happy despite this, because Gabriel needs her to keep his access to the ports (for his drug trade) and Tom needs her for his dream of changing the LA skyline. Judge Wallace rules against Billy on the matter of suppression. Billy visits JT, and realizes that his true enemy is the La Mano cartel. He asks Marisol about the cartel, and when she evades the question, they get into a fight. She later visits Denise and gets her to ask Billy about the case, making him suspicious. JT tells Billy that Tito was Roman's CI. Billy confronts Roman and tries to turn him.
| 13 | 5 | "Who's Gabriel" | Dennie Gordon | Tony Saltzman | June 15, 2018 |
Marisol's backstory is revealed. When Roman does not show up to a meeting where he was supposed to snitch on the cartel to Rashad, Billy visits him at home. Billy manages to convince him to go meet with Rashad, but Danny sees them leave together. Tom and Brittany spend more time together. Roman meets with Rashad and tells him that he is willing to talk in return for immunity and witness protection for his family, much to a watching Danny's horror. Denise starts working for Marisol, who fires her campaign manager Elena for asking too many questions. Brittany tells Tom that Billy has a witness that he has managed to flip. Clayton tries to woo Patty. Tom visits Marisol and tells her that they are out of time and options. She goes to visit Julio at the prison. Danny tells Tom that Roman is the snitch. Marisol later takes Billy to meet her brother Gabriel.
| 14 | 6 | "Two Cinderellas" | Lawrence Trilling | Noelle Valdivia | June 15, 2018 |
JT is shown to have given up his legal practice and become a recluse after an execution that resulted from his losing a case to then prosecutor Martha Wallace. Billy attends a party at Gabriel's house in Mexico. Danny tries to lure Roman out, but he gets suspicious. Tensions rise between Marisol and Gabriel. Roman meets with Danny and tells him to kill him, so that his family never has to find out what they have done. Danny is unable to pull the trigger, and Roman leaves. Gabriel's henchman kills Roman and his family. A convict tells JT about a threat to Julio's life, in hopes of making a deal. Gabriel shows Billy around the estate, and he sees guns and people with amputated limbs. Patty calls Billy about the Roman murders and Julio, but Gabriel makes sure he does not get the message. As Patty rushes to try and save Julio, a prison guard forces him to leave a suicide note confessing to the murder, and kills him. Gabriel tells Marisol that the only way to stop Billy from digging further is to kill him. Patty finally gets through to Billy, and he walks out of the estate with a bottle in his hand.
| 15 | 7 | "Diablo Verde" | Lawrence Trilling | Jennifer Ames and Steve Turner | June 15, 2018 |
Billy comes to in bed next to a woman of Chinese descent. He finds out that he is being held captive by a group of unknown people. The woman, who calls herself Janet, tells Billy that they had met in a bar when Billy was asking for a ride to the border. Janet claims not to know where they are or why, either. Billy tries to get the people in the house to talk, but has little luck except a few cryptic phrases. He throws Gabriel's name out in conversation, which seems to make some of the people nervous. Billy and Janet attack their captors and make a run for it. While being tracked by a drone, their captors, and men with automatic weapons, they manage to make it to the town. Billy tasks some townspeople to protect Janet and tries to find a way to the border. 24 hours earlier, Patty spends the night with Clayton, and steals Roman's phone from a box of evidence in his apartment. Marisol tells Denise that Billy walked out of the estate and went missing. She is then confronted by Elena, who knows about her past as Gabriel's sister Claudia. Elena is later attacked by Gabriel's henchman who tells her to leave town. Tom's dependence on Brittany increases. Worried about Billy, Denise starts drinking heavily. Danny is confronted by the broker and the henchman, and commits suicide after realizing he cannot get away. Marva, who is calling numbers from Roman's phone at Patty's behest, gets through to Danny's phone as it is being bagged into evidence. Visiting the club, Patty links Roman and Danny to the broker. JT manages to find Billy, who reunites with Patty and Denise.
| 16 | 8 | "Tongue Tied" | Dennie Gordon | Marisa Wegrzyn | June 15, 2018 |
Billy sees one of his captors at Marisol's victory celebration. Billy and Patty confront the broker, and get him to flip. He tells Rashad enough to implicate Tom and Gabriel, as well as to throw suspicion on Claudia Quintero, whose name they do not recognize. Patty calls Brittany to tell her that Tom is dangerous; Tom lets her go despite catching her in a lie, because he realizes that they do not have a future together. Denise continues to drink heavily, despondent at having lost her role model, now that she realizes what Marisol has done. Clayton breaks up with Patty because she endangered him by stealing Roman's phone. Billy confronts Tom, who ridicules him for not realizing that Marisol was the one who had Julio killed, not him; in response, Billy ridicules Tom for not knowing that Gabriel is Marisol's brother. Billy and Patty approach Elena for information; she tells them about Marisol's real name and refers them to a church in her hometown. Billy and Patty go back to Mexico to find information on Gabriel and Claudia, but fail to do so. The FBI arrest Tom, but when Rashad shows up shortly thereafter, it is revealed to have been a kidnapping ploy by Gabriel's men. Gabriel is later shown to have amputated both of Tom's arms and legs and finally cuts out his tongue. Billy visits Marisol, now the mayor of LA, and she says she never loved him. Billy's last words to Marisol are to remind her of the blood on her hands.

=== Season 3 (2019) ===
| No. overall | No. in season | Title | Directed by | Written by | Original release date |
|---|---|---|---|---|---|
| 17 | 1 | "The Subsidence Adventure" | Lawrence Trilling | Jennifer Ames & Steve Turner | October 4, 2019 |
Gene and Bobbi, farmers in Blackwood county, are having financial troubles due to the drought and water issues causing their crops to suffer. One night, after hearing some disturbances in the field, Bobbi investigates and falls to her death in a sinkhole that opens up on the farm. A distraught Gene then reaches out to their mutual friend Billy McBride, attempting to enlist his help to sue a neighboring farmer for water misuse which he blames as the cause of the sinkhole. On a drive, Gene and Billy meet Wade Blackwood, who owns Tallgrass Farms, Blackwood Farms, and much of the land beside Gene's property. Intrigued with the case, Billy begins investigating by seeking out the Blackwood County Water board, in a dilapidated single office building which is shared with Tallgrass Farms. Billy meets an annoyed Tallgrass employee who shares with him a video of the California Aqueduct project. After more driving around, Billy arrives at a casino, which functions as the meeting place and drug den for Wade Blackwood and his business partners. Unbeknownst to Billy, he had actually been to this casino before, though he cannot remember it. After having conversations with Wade and Littlefoot, Billy retires to his room. He observes a woman in the parking lot and follows her, only to be knocked out afterwards.
| 18 | 2 | "Happiness From The Ground Up" | Lawrence Trilling | Marisa Wegrzyn | October 4, 2019 |
Billy meets Wade Blackwood's sister, Diana, as she prepares for the high-profile launch of her new almond-based lifestyle brand; Billy seeks Patty's help to develop a wrongful death claim; Billy encounters an old enemy and new complications.
| 19 | 3 | "Good Morning, Central Valley" | Lawrence Trilling | Jennifer Ames & Steve Turner & Marisa Wegrzyn | October 4, 2019 |
Billy and Patty try to convince county residents to join their class action against the water board, but Wade Blackwood counters by bringing on a defense attorney with a personal vendetta against Billy.
| 20 | 4 | "Full Circle" | Lawrence Trilling | Jennifer Ames & Steve Turner & Marisa Wegrzyn | October 4, 2019 |
If Billy can't shake the feeling he's been to Blackwood Country before, it's because he has; flashbacks show Billy having another drunk, lost weekend; Brittany starts making plans for her future and must ask Billy for a big favour.
| 21 | 5 | "Argus 2: Battledome" | Lawrence Trilling | Andrew Matisziw | October 4, 2019 |
It is revealed that Roy left his entire estate to Stephanie. Both Wade and Diana approach her about buying Roy's land.
| 22 | 6 | "Fer-De-Lance" | Lawrence Trilling | Jennifer Ames & Steve Turner & Marisa Wegrzyn | October 4, 2019 |
Billy and Patty try to turn Wade and Diana against each other during the depositions. Brittany has her hearing before the California State Bar.
| 23 | 7 | "Conscious Uncoupling" | Lawrence Trilling | Marisa Wegrzyn | October 4, 2019 |
Even though Wade describes how he obtained the water, Billy and Patty are stymied by the action of the judge.
| 24 | 8 | "Joy Division" | Lawrence Trilling | Jennifer Ames & Steve Turner | October 4, 2019 |
Diana becomes desperate and Wade attempts to hide his crimes. When Billy reveals irrefutable evidence, Wade makes a deal but pays a heavy price. Denise anonymously reveals Marisol's involvement in the Blackwood's scheme to a news reporter, forcing Marisol to resign as mayor and face criminal charges. Donald fires Sumi after losing the case, and Patty meets her birth mother.

=== Season 4 (2021) ===
| No. overall | No. in season | Title | Directed by | Written by | Original release date |
|---|---|---|---|---|---|
| 25 | 1 | "Hadleyville" | Billy Bob Thornton | Jennifer Ames & Steve Turner & Marisa Wegrzyn | September 24, 2021 |
| 26 | 2 | "The Pain Killer" | Lawrence Trilling | Jennifer Ames & Steve Turner & Marisa Wegrzyn | September 24, 2021 |
| 27 | 3 | "Signed, William Hamilton McBride" | Lawrence Trilling | Jennifer Ames & Steve Turner & Marisa Wegrzyn | September 24, 2021 |
| 28 | 4 | "Forcibly Removed" | Lawrence Trilling | Jennifer Ames & Steve Turner & Marisa Wegrzyn | September 24, 2021 |
| 29 | 5 | "Spilt Milk" | Derek Johansen | Jennifer Ames & Steve Turner & Andrew Matisziw | September 24, 2021 |
| 30 | 6 | "Rundleworks" | Lawrence Trilling | Marisa Wegrzyn & Kerri Brady Long | September 24, 2021 |
| 31 | 7 | "Lawyer Trickery Bullshit" | Lawrence Trilling | Jennifer Ames & Steve Turner & Marisa Wegrzyn | September 24, 2021 |
| 32 | 8 | "It's Time" | Lawrence Trilling | Jennifer Ames & Steve Turner & Andrew Matisziw | September 24, 2021 |

== Production ==
=== Development ===
On May 14, 2015, it was announced that Amazon had issued a pilot order for the series, then titled Trial, based on a script by David E. Kelley and Jonathan Shapiro. On December 1, 2015, Amazon announced that it was bypassing the pilot process with the project and was instead issuing a straight-to-series order consisting of a ten-episode first season to premiere in 2016. The first season would ultimately come to consist of eight episodes total. On August 7, 2016, it was announced that the first season would premiere on October 13, 2016.

=== Casting ===
On June 25, 2015, it was reported that Kevin Costner was in talks to join the series in the lead role of Billy McBride. By June 30, he had exited talks. On July 23, 2015, it was confirmed that Billy Bob Thornton had been cast in the role. In August, Olivia Thirlby and Maria Bello joined the main cast. On September 14, Sarah Wynter was cast in the series regular role of Gina Larson. In November, Molly Parker and Britain Dalton joined the production as series regulars. The following March, Nina Arianda and Tania Raymonde were also announced as part of the main cast. In June, Dwight Yoakam and Harold Perrineau were cast in recurring roles. In August, the final casting announcements, of Diana Hopper and Jason Ritter in recurring roles, were made.

For the show's fourth and final season, Brandon Scott and Geoffrey Arend joined the main cast, while Obba Babatundé and Elias Koteas appear in recurring roles.

=== Setting ===
Goliath is set and filmed in Santa Monica, California. The venue Chez Jay, which Billy McBride frequents and often works out of, is a real-life bar and restaurant. Production for the fourth season moved to San Francisco.

=== Renewal ===
On February 15, 2017, Amazon announced the series had been renewed for a second season. In that announcement, it was also confirmed that Clyde Phillips was joining the series in season two as the day-to-day showrunner. Kelley, Shapiro and Ross Fineman were set to remain in their roles as executive producers.

On December 18, 2018, TVline.com announced that Goliath was renewed for a 3rd season. This announcement also provided the casting additions of more than half a dozen actors including Dennis Quaid and Amy Brenneman as Wade and Diana Blackwood, Season 3's billionaire siblings who become the antagonists after the accidental death of Billy's friend Gene's wife.

== Reception ==
=== Critical response ===
On review aggregator Rotten Tomatoes, the first season holds an approval rating of 78% based on 37 professional reviews, with an average score of 6.04/10. The site's critical consensus reads, "Compelling performances from an excellent cast—led by standout Billy Bob Thornton—propel David E. Kelley's Goliath into must-watch TV territory." On Metacritic the first season has a weighted average score of 65 out of 100, based on 29 critics, indicating "generally favorable reviews".

On Rotten Tomatoes, season two has an approval rating of 88% based on reviews from 8 critics. It was noted for showing much more division between critic and audience scores than the first season.

On Rotten Tomatoes season three has an approval rating of 80% based on reviews from five critics, while season four has an approval rating of 100% based on reviews from five critics.

=== Awards and nominations ===
| Year | Ceremony | Category | Recipient(s) | Result | Ref. |
|---|---|---|---|---|---|
| 2017 | Golden Globe Awards | Best Actor – Television Series Drama | Billy Bob Thornton | Won | |
| 2019 | Satellite Awards | Best Actor in a Drama / Genre Series | Billy Bob Thornton | Nominated | |
| 2019 | Satellite Awards | Best Supporting Actor in a Series, Miniseries or TV Film | Mark Duplass | Nominated | |
| 2020 | Satellite Awards | Best Actor in a Drama / Genre Series | Billy Bob Thornton | Nominated | |
| 2020 | Satellite Awards | Best Supporting Actor in a Series, Miniseries or TV Film | Dennis Quaid | Nominated | |
