= Josh Cooke =

American actor (born 1979)

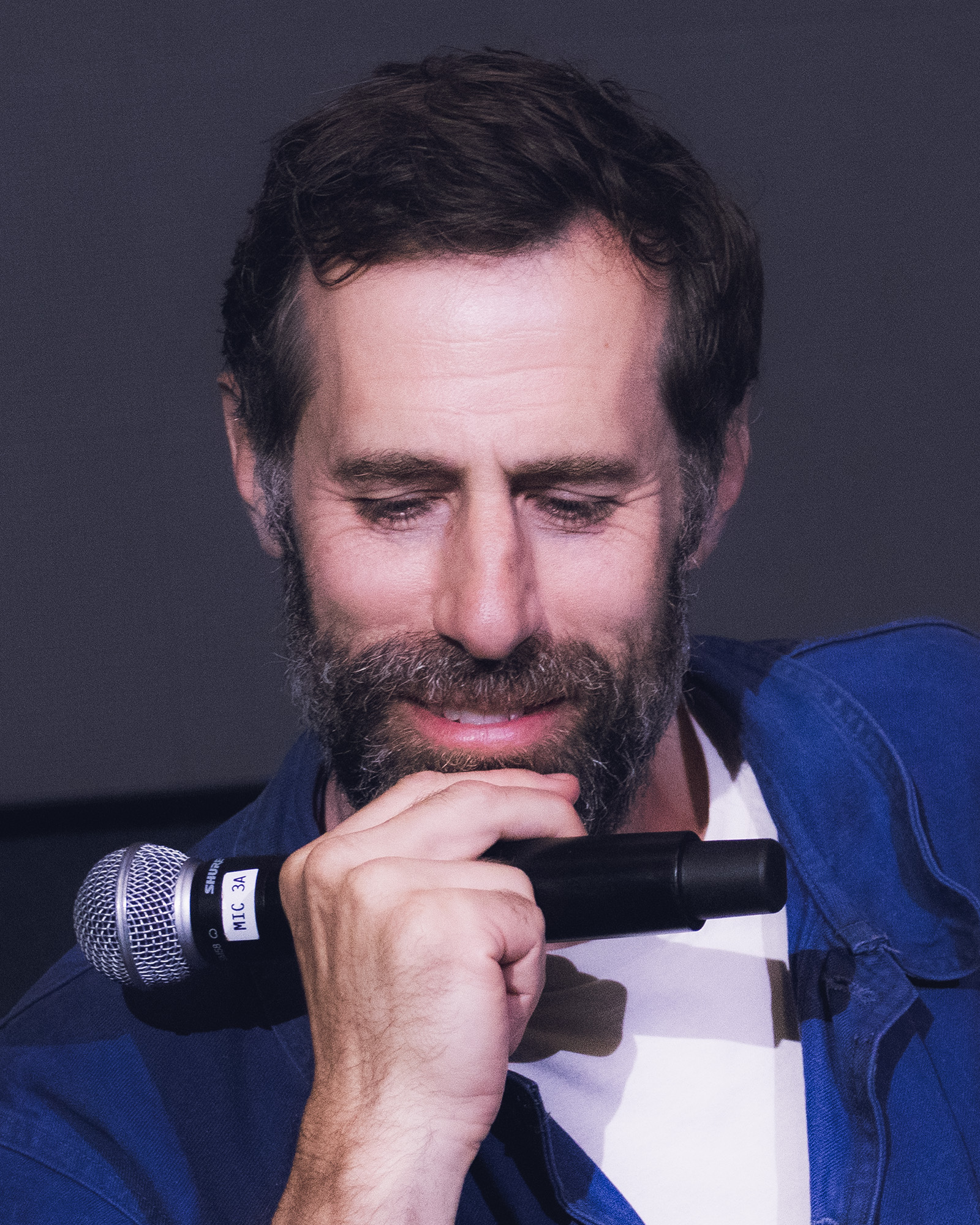
- Cooke in 2025
- Born: November 22, 1979 (age 46)
- Occupation: Actor
- Years active: 2002–present
- Spouse: Eleisha Eagle (m. 2011)

Josh Cooke (born November 22, 1979) is an American actor.

== Career ==
=== Television ===
He played the lead role of Nate Solomon in NBC's 2005 sitcom Committed. He appeared in guest roles on Without a Trace, Century City, Once and Again, 10-8, and Dragnet.

In 2006, he starred in Four Kings, and Big Day, neither of which was renewed. He appeared in Curb Your Enthusiasm. In 2009, Cooke appeared in the Joss Whedon show Dollhouse as Leo Carpenter.

He played Dan Stonewater on the final episode of Scrubs and Rabbi Feldman on the final episode of The King of Queens. In 2009, Cooke played Auggie Harris in Season 6 Episode 7 on Numbers. Cooke played Ben Coles on Better with You, a sitcom which began in 2010 and was cancelled after 22 episodes.

Cooke voiced various characters in Seth Green's Robot Chicken and made several appearances in the Showtime series Dexter as Louis Greene.

Cooke played Joel Stevens, boyfriend of Rachel Bilson's character Zoe Hart, in CW's Hart of Dixie (season 3) and appears as Sue Heck's college professor on whom she has a strong crush in the seventh season of The Middle.

In 2018, he guest starred as Greg in Younger as Caitlin's older boyfriend and as Barry, father to Sheldon's perceived rival, in Young Sheldon. He played Mallory Hanson's boyfriend, Daniel Penbraith for a while in Grace and Frankie. He portrayed Reeves in Castle Rock. He also guest starred as Mason in episode 9 of season 2 of The Marvelous Mrs. Maisel.

In 2020, appeared as journalist Loudon Wainwright Jr. in the Disney Plus series The Right Stuff.

=== Film ===
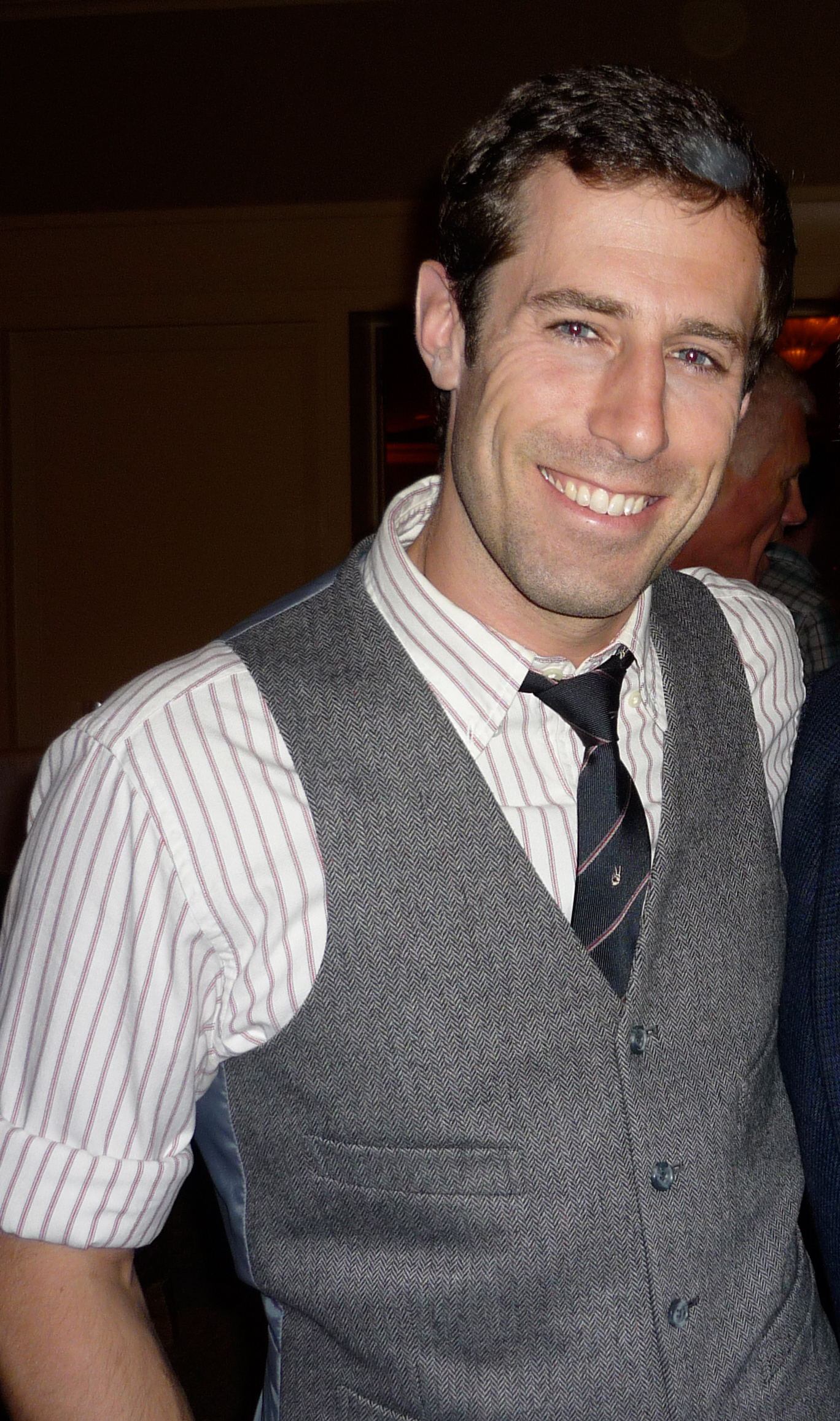
Cooke in 2010

In 2006, Cooke co-starred in the film Wasted as Dixon, alongside Eddie Kaye Thomas and Kip Pardue. Cooke also played Christina Milian's love interest, Eddie, in Snowglobe. He played Eric in Young People Fucking (2007). He appeared in the 2010 film A Fork in the Road. He had a small role in I Love You, Man as Alan, a straight married man in a relationship with Robbie Klaven (played by Andy Samberg). Cooke was one of the lead roles in the 2011 horror film Quarantine 2: Terminal.

Cooke starred as Andy in the 2010 comedy Group Sex, alongside Greg Grunberg and Odette Yustman. Cooke played the lead role as Ron in the 2008 direct-to-DVD film Bachelor Party 2: The Last Temptation.

=== Theatre ===
In 2016, Cooke was cast in the La Jolla Playhouse premiere of Pulitzer Prize winner and Tony Award nominee Ayad Akhtar's Junk: The Golden Age of Debt as "Robert Merkin." It will be directed by Tony Award winner Doug Hughes and premiere on July 26, 2016.

=== Music ===
On November 10, 2015, Cooke released his debut album 'fō under the stage name "fō". It was executively produced by Cooke and Erik Kertes.

== Personal life ==
Cooke has been married to Eleisha Eagle since April 2011.

== Filmography ==
=== Film ===
Year	Title	Role	Notes
2005	Partner(s)	Tom	
2006	Wasted	Dixon	
2007	Young People Fucking	Eric	
2008	Bachelor Party 2: The Last Temptation	Ron	Direct-to-video
2008	My Sassy Girl	Yuppie	Direct-to-video
2009	I Love You, Man	Alan (bench press guy)	
2010	A Fork in the Road	Will Carson	
2010	Group Sex	Andy	Direct-to-video
2011	Quarantine 2: Terminal	Henry	
2012	16-Love	Dr. Jim	
2013	Miss Dial	Soup caller	
2013	Finding Joy	Kyle	
2014	The Opposite Sex	Kendrick	
2016	Hail, Caesar!	Box Breakfast A.D.	
2018	The Middle of X	Casey Foster	
2019	Framing John DeLorean	Howard Weitzman	
2025	Xeno	Agent Browne	

=== Television ===
Year	Title	Role	Notes
2002	Once and Again	Engineer	Episode: "Experience Is the Teacher"
2003	L.A. Dragnet	Brad Lee	Episode: "The Brass Ring"
2003	10-8: Officers on Duty	EMT	Episode: "The Wild Bunch"
2004	Without a Trace	Justin Pettit	Episode: "Risen"
2005	Committed	Nate Solomon	Main role; 13 episodes
2005	Unscripted	Actor at cafe	Episode 6
2005	Curb Your Enthusiasm	Dan	Episode: "The Bowtie"
2006	Four Kings	Ben Wolf	Main role; 13 episodes
2006–2007	Big Day	Danny Garfinkle	Main role; 13 episodes
2006; 2008	Robot Chicken	Various voices	2 episodes
2007	The King of Queens	Rabbi Feldman	Episode: "China Syndrome"
2007	Snowglobe	Eddie	Television film
2008	Notes from the Underbelly	Ian	3 episodes
2008	Saving Grace	Zeke	Episode: "A Little Hometown Love"
2009	Dollhouse	Leo Carpenter	Episode: "Echoes"
2009	Scrubs	Dan	2 episodes
2009	Numbers	Augie Harris	Episode: "Shadow Markets"
2009	The Closer	Detective Ranski	Episode: "The Life"
2010	In Plain Sight	Henry Doer / Henry Ross	Episode: "When Mary Met Marshall"
2010–2011	Better with You	Ben Coles	Main role; 22 episodes
2011	Svetlana	Donor	Episode: "Bringing Up Baby"
2011–2012	Dexter	Louis Greene	Recurring role; 11 episodes
2013	Royal Pains	Ben	Episode: "Chock Full O' Nuts"
2013–2014	Hart of Dixie	Joel Stephens	Recurring role; 17 episodes
2015	Proof	Liam / Tommy	Episode: "Showdown"
2015–2016	Longmire	Eamonn O'Neill	6 episodes
2016	The Middle	Professor Grant	2 episodes
2016	Elementary	Phil Balsam	Episode: "Murder Ex Machina"
2017	Gone	Greg	Episode: "Crystal"
2017	Chicago Justice	Ted Reynolds	Episode: "AQD"
2018	Blindspot	Andy Taylor	Episode: "Hot Burning Flames"
2018	Unbreakable Kimmy Schmidt	Ethan Goodman	Episode: "Kimmy Meets an Old Friend!"
2018	Castle Rock	Reeves	3 episodes
2018	Younger	Greg	Episode: "Girls on the Side"
2018	Young Sheldon	Barry	2 episodes
2018	S.W.A.T.	Connor Reeves	Episode: "S.O.S."
2018	The Marvelous Mrs. Maisel	Mason White	Episode: "Vote for Kennedy, Vote for Kennedy"
2019–2022	Grace and Frankie	Dan Penbraith	4 episodes
2019	Bull	Kevin Weeks	Episode: "Prior Bad Acts"
2020	The Right Stuff	Loudon Wainwright Jr.	8 episodes
2021–2024	Law & Order: Special Victims Unit	Agent Harrison Clay	3 episodes
2022	The Blacklist	Walker Burgos	Episode: "Dr. Razmik Maier"
2022	The Equalizer	Bert Singer	Episode: "Somewhere Over the Hudson"
2023	Saint X	Ethan / Mr. Dolphin Shorts	Recurring role; 5 episodes
2025	Leanne	Randy	Episode: "Oh, Knoxville"
2026	R. J. Decker	Agent Jason Koop	Episode: “The Needle and the Damage Done”
