= Lawrence Trilling =

American television director

- Born: June 29, 1966 (age 60); Wayne, New Jersey, US
- Education: Columbia University
- Occupations: Television director and Producer
- Known for: Showrunner of Goliath

Lawrence Trilling (born June 29, 1966) is an American television director, producer, showrunner, and writer. He has directed nearly 150 hours of television to date, and served as producer/executive producer on such series as Felicity, Alias, Parenthood, Pushing Daisies, Goliath, and Outer Range. He has directed episodes of many popular series, including Scrubs, Monk, Masters of Sex, Damages, Crazy Ex-Girlfriend and Snowfall.

== Early life and education ==
Trilling was born in Wayne, New Jersey, and moved to Santa Monica, California, when he was three. At Lincoln Jr. High, Trilling met fellow future director Matt Reeves, who inspired Trilling with his Super 8 film camera and editing system. Together, they co-wrote several films, which Reeves directed and Trilling starred in. One of those films, The Loser, was screened at a student film festival at the Nuart Theater in West Los Angeles, where they befriended fellow filmmaker J. J. Abrams.

Trilling graduated from Santa Monica High School in 1984. He attended Columbia University and graduated with a B.A. in English Literature in 1988, and received an MFA in Film and Television Production from UCLA in 1992.

== Film and television career ==
=== 1990s ===
Trilling's first break was selling the screenplay Delivered, a black comedy he co-wrote with his childhood friend and fellow pizza delivery driver, Andrew Liotta. The script, about an angry, overeducated pizza man who is mistaken for a local serial killer, was produced by Banner Entertainment and premiered at the Seattle Film Festival in 1998. The same year, he directed the film Dinner and Driving, a romantic comedy about the anxiety of commitment, which he co-wrote with his cousin, Steven Wolfson. The film played multiple festivals and aired on HBO and Lifetime, and later streamed on Netflix.

Trilling made his television directorial debut in Season One of Felicity, when he directed the acclaimed episode "The Fugue". He became a Producer/Director for season two and directed 14 episodes over the show's four seasons. On the strength of his work on Felicity, he was hired to direct two other dramas for the WB Network; Roswell for Jason Katims and Popular, Ryan Murphy's debut series.

=== 2000s ===
After their collaboration on Felicity, Trilling followed J. J. Abrams to Alias, where he directed episodes throughout season two and became a producer/director for seasons three and four. He also wrote and directed the film Porn n' Chicken, which was Comedy Central's first original movie. After this, Trilling became a frequent director on the hit NBC comedy series, Scrubs, helming six episodes in the first two seasons.

Trilling then worked for Warner Bros. and ABC as producer/director on Invasion and Pushing Daisies. During this period, he also directed episodes of Damages, Monk, Brothers & Sisters, Life, and Studio 60 on the Sunset Strip, among others.

In 2010, he directed the feature film comedy Group Sex, which he co-wrote with Greg Grunberg, starring Henry Winkler.

=== 2010–present ===
In 2010, Trilling joined Jason Katims to become an executive producer/director for the acclaimed NBC drama Parenthood. Praised for its honest, funny and emotional examination of family life, it was one of the first television shows to raise awareness of Autism Spectrum Disorder. The show ran for six seasons and Trilling directed 38 episodes. While working on the show for Universal, he also sold two pilots as a writer.

Between 2013 and 2017, Trilling directed episodes of the popular shows Masters of Sex, Rectify, Crazy Ex-Girlfriend, Agent Carter, and Snowfall, among others.

In 2016, Trilling teamed up with David E. Kelly to direct the pilot of Goliath for Amazon Prime Video, for which Billy Bob Thornton won the Golden Globe for Best Actor in a Drama Series in 2017. He took over as Showrunner in season two and ran the show for its next two seasons until it concluded in 2021. He also directed the Pilot and first three episodes of Condor, a re-imagining of the movie from 1975.

From 2019 to 2023, Trilling was under an overall deal at Amazon Studios. In addition to show running Goliath, he sold multiple projects into development and came aboard to direct and Executive Produce Outer Range, starring Josh Brolin.

== Filmography ==
=== Television ===
Year	Title	Director	Producer	Notes
1999–2002	Felicity	Yes	Yes	Directed 14 episodes; Wrote episode "True Colors"
2000	Ed	Yes	No	Episode "Something Old, Something New"
2001	Popular	Yes	No	2 episodes
2001–2002	Scrubs	Yes	No	6 episodes
2001–2002	Roswell	Yes	No	2 episodes
2003	Monk	Yes	No	Episode "Mr. Monk and the Very, Very Old Man"
2003	Nip/Tuck	Yes	No	Episode "Nanette Babcock"
2003	Miracles	Yes	No	Episode "Saint Debbie"
2003–2005	Alias	Yes	Supervising	Directed 15 episodes
2005–2006	Invasion	Yes	Co-executive	Directed 6 episodes
2006	Brothers & Sisters	Yes	No	Episode "Northern Exposure"
2007	Studio 60 on the Sunset Strip	Yes	No	Episode "Monday"
2007	Damages	Yes	No	Episode "Tastes Like a Ho-Ho"
2007	Life	Yes	No	Episode "Let Her Go"
2007	Re-Inventing the Wheelers	Yes	No	Unaired pilot
2007–2009	Pushing Daisies	Yes	Co-executive	Directed 5 episodes
2009	Drop Dead Diva	Yes	No	Episode "The Chinese Wall"
2009	Mercy	Yes	No	2 episodes
2010–2015	Parenthood	Yes	Executive	Directed 38 episodes
2013	Masters of Sex	Yes	No	Episode "Standard Deviation"
2014	Killer Women	Yes	No	Episode "La Sicaria"
2014	About a Boy	Yes	No	Episode "About a Rib Chute"
2015	Rectify	Yes	No	Episode "Thrill Ride"
2015	Crazy Ex-Girlfriend	Yes	No	Episode "I'm So Happy That Josh Is So Happy!"
2016	Agent Carter	Yes	No	2 episodes
2016	Recovery Road	Yes	No	2 episodes
2016–2021	Goliath	Yes	No	22 episodes; Also showrunner
2017	The Get Down	Yes	No	Episode "Unfold Your Own Myth"
2017	Underground	Yes	No	Episode "Citizen"
2017	Snowfall	Yes	No	Episode "Seven-Four"
2018	Condor	Yes	Executive	Directed 3 episodes
2022	Outer Range	Yes	No	Directed 2 episodes
2024	Nobody Wants This	Yes	No	Directed 2 episodes
2026	Monarch: Legacy of Monsters	Yes	Executive	Directed 2 episodes
TBA	God of War	Yes	No	TBA; filming

=== Film ===
Year	Title	Director	Writer
1997	Dinner and Driving	Yes	Yes
1998	Delivered	No	Yes
2002	Porn n' Chicken	Yes	Yes
2010	Group Sex	Yes	Yes
