= Delivered =

- Directed by: Guy Ferland
- Written by: Andrew Liotta; Lawrence Trilling
- Starring: Ron Eldard; David Strickland; Leslie Stefanson
- Cinematography: Shane F. Kelly
- Edited by: Deborah Zeitman
- Music by: Nicholas Pike
- Production company: Banner Entertainment
- Distributed by: Fox Lorber Films
- Release dates: October 4, 1999 (Austin Film Festival); December 5, 2000 (United States)
- Running time: 93 minutes
- Country: United States
- Language: English

Delivered is a 1999 crime comedy film directed by Guy Ferland and written by Andrew Liotta and Lawrence Trilling. The film stars Ron Eldard, David Strickland (in his final and posthumous film role), Leslie Stefanson, Scott Bairstow, and Nicky Katt.

== Synopsis ==
A pizza delivery boy finds himself framed for a series of murders.

== Cast ==
- Ron Eldard as Reed
- David Strickland as Will
- Leslie Stefanson as Claire
- Scott Bairstow as Canyon
- Nicky Katt as Barry
- Jillian Armenante as Danielle
- Bob Morrisey as Detective Lozano
- Mark Berry as Detective Baines
- Eric Keenleyside as Hugo
