= Eric Keenleyside =

Canadian actor (born 1957)

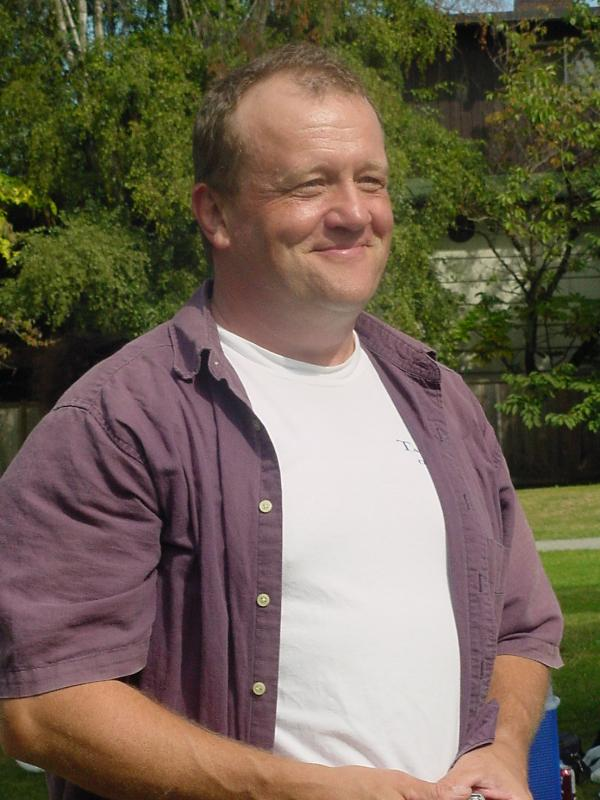
- Eric Keenleyside, 2008
- Born: October 11, 1957 (age 68); St. Stephen, New Brunswick, Canada
- Education: University of Windsor
- Occupation: Actor
- Years active: 1985–present
- Spouse: Peg Christopherson (m. 1982)
- Children: 2

Eric Keenleyside (born October 11, 1957) is a Canadian actor.

== Early life ==
Eric Keenleyside was born in St. Stephen, New Brunswick, grew up in London, Ontario, and spent time in Brisbane, Australia. He received a Bachelor of Fine Arts (acting) from the University of Windsor (Ontario, Canada) in 1980 and apprenticed at the Stratford Shakespeare Festival. He has lived and worked in Toronto, Los Angeles, and Vancouver.

== Career ==
In the early and mid 1990s, Keenleyside appeared in series such as Street Justice, Hawkeye, Madison, Highlander: The Series and Titanic. In 1999, he appeared in Guy Ferland's comedy film Delivered. He appeared in an episode of The King of Queens in 2000. In 2006, Keenleyside appeared in the TV film Murder on Pleasant Drive.

In 2007, Keenleyside played Robert Doherty in the short-lived ABC series Traveler and in 2010 played Bob Overton in the series Hellcats. In 2013, he starred in the direct-to-video action film The Package alongside "Stone Cold" Steve Austin and Dolph Lundgren. He also recurred as Maurice French, father of Belle (Emilie de Ravin), on the popular ABC show Once Upon a Time. More recently he has been a regular on Loudermilk.

== Personal life ==
Keenleyside mostly lives in Tsawwassen, British Columbia, Canada with his wife Peg Christopherson and their two children.

== Filmography ==
=== Film ===
Year	Title	Role
1985	Head Office	Whale Protester #1
1985	Big Deal	Born Again Christian
1986	Overnight	Ernst
1988	Blue City Slammers	Butter
1988	Short Circuit 2	Simpsons Truck Driver
1988	Buying Time	The Bartender
1990	Stella	Wendell
1990	Perfectly Normal	Restaurant Man
1996	Bordello of Blood	Sheriff Noonan
1997	Prefontaine	James Buck
1998	Delivered	Hugo
1999	Mr. Rice's Secret	Ray
2000	Beautiful Joe	Larry
2001	Antitrust	Coffee Guard
2001	Freddy Got Fingered	Foreman
2002	Bang Bang You're Dead	Bob Adams
2003	Final Destination 2	Detective Suby
2003	Dreamcatcher	Rick McCarthy
2003	Agent Cody Banks	Kitchen Cleaning Agent
2004	Walking Tall	Dan Stadler
2005	The Interpreter	Rory Robb
2006	Firewall	Alan Hughes
2007	War	Leevie
2009	Damage	Val Sullivan
2010	Dear Mr. Gacy	Stan
2012	A Bride for Christmas	Hank Patterston
2013	The Package	Doug 'Big Doug'
2013	Suddenlly	Mayor
2014	Godzilla	Boyd
2014	Big Eyes	Gannett Lawyer #2
2015	The Driftless Area	Mr. Bromley
2015	Vendetta	Captain Baldus
2016	The Edge of Seventeen	Tom
2017	Entanglement	Norm Layten
2017	Never Steady, Never Still	Don Camdon
2017	1922	Lars
2017	Woody Woodpecker	Roscoe
2017	Prodigals	Doug
2018	Overboard	One-Armed Sheriff
2018	Welcome to Marwen	Larry / Friar
2019	Ash	Terry
2026	111 Echoes from Halifax	

=== Television ===
Year	Title	Role	Notes
1985	Comedy Factory	Quinn	Episode: "Four in Love"
1986	The Marriage Bed	Unknown	
1988	CBS Summer Playhouse	Director	Episode: "Mad Avenue"
1988	War of the Worlds	Foreman	Episode: "The Walls of Jericho"
1988	Rin Tin Tin: K-9 Cop	Cash Bennett	Episode: "Kids Just Wanna Have Fun"
1989	The Twilight Zone	Bartender	Episode: "Love is Blind"
1991–1993	Street Justice	Doug / Councilman Wallace	2 episodes
1994	The Commish	Donald Masters	Episode: "Keeping Secrets"
1994–1995	Hawkeye	Doyle	3 episodes
1994–1996	Highlander: The Series	Dallman Ross / Trey Franks	2 episodes
1995–1996	Madison	Stanislav Wakaluk	7 episodes
1996	Titanic	Black Billy Jack	2 episodes
1996–1999	The Outer Limits	Peters / Major Ford / Friedkin	3 episodes
1998	The X-Files	Lance Kernof	Episode: "All Souls"
2000	The King of Queens	Roger	Episode: "Whine Country"
2000–2002	Just Deal	Mike Roberts Sr.	19 episodes
2001	The Chris Isaak Show	Doug	Episode: "Hell is Other People"
2001–2005	Cold Squad	Captain Rudecki / Mr. Walters	3 episodes
2003	Smallville	Mike the Bartender	Episode: "Suspect"
2005	Stargate: SG-1	Fred	Episode: "Citizen Joe"
2006	A Girl Like Me: The Gwen Araujo Story	Cop	TV film
2006–2012	Supernatural	Dennis / Jim McAnn	2 episodes
2007	Psych	Steve Hitchcock	Episode: "Rob-a-Bye Baby"
2010–2011	Hellcats	Bob Overton	5 episodes
2011	Fringe	Jerry Bissell	Episode: "Immortality"
2011	R. L. Stine's The Haunting Hour: The Series	Mr. Palmer	Episode: "Pumpkinhead"
2012	Alcatraz	Captain	Episode: "Tommy Madsen"
2012–2016	Once Upon a Time	Sir Maurice / Moe French	7 episodes
2015	Garage Sale Mystery: The Wedding Dress	Sean	TV film
2015	Fargo	Bud Jorgenlen	3 episodes
2016	Dirk Gently's Holistic Detective Agency	Police Captain	3 episodes
2016	The Man in the High Castle	Ron Whittaker	Episode: "The Road Less Traveled"
2017–2020	Loudermilk	Father Michael	18 episodes
2018	Time for Me to Come Home for Christmas	Bob Hill	TV film
2019	A Series of Unfortunate Events	Fire Chief	Episode: "Penultimate Peril: Part 2"
2019	Unspeakable	Dr. Martin Davey	5 episodes
2019	The Twilight Zone	Mayor Matheson	Episode: "A Traveler"
2019	iZombie	Jack Klein	Episode: "Death of a Car Salesman"
2019	Mystery 101: Words Can Kill	Phil Jenk	TV film
2020	A Beautiful Place to Die: A Martha's Vineyard Mystery	Chief Madieras	TV film
2020	Riddled with Deceit: A Martha's Vineyard Mystery	Chief Madieras	TV film
2021	Ships in the Night: A Martha's Vineyard Mystery	Chief Madieras	TV film
2021–2023	Superman & Lois	George Dean	13 episodes
2022	Rip in Time	Calvin	TV film
2023	How She Caught a Killer	David Goodman	TV film
2024	A Reason for the Season	Jack Marshall	TV film
2025	The Wish Swap	Mac	TV film
2025	Happy Face	Carl O'Neill	3 episodes
2025	A Royal Montana Christmas	Jimmy Blaylock	TV film
