= David Strickland =

American actor (1969–1999)

- Born: David Gordon Strickland, Jr. October 14, 1969; Glen Cove, New York, U.S.
- Died: March 22, 1999 (aged 29); Las Vegas, Nevada, U.S.
- Occupation: Actor
- Years active: 1994–1999
- Known for: Todd Stites in Suddenly Susan

David Gordon Strickland, Jr. (October 14, 1969 – March 22, 1999) was an American actor. He was best known for playing the boyish rock music reporter Todd Stites in the NBC sitcom Suddenly Susan.

== Life and career ==
David Gordon Strickland, Jr., was born on October 14, 1969, in Glen Cove, Long Island, New York. His parents, David Sr. and Karen, were both business executives. Strickland moved with his family to Princeton, New Jersey, and later to Los Angeles, where he became an actor. Strickland guest starred in the television series Dave's World, Roseanne, Mad About You, and Sister, Sister, until he landed his role on Suddenly Susan in 1996.

== Personal life ==
Strickland suffered from bipolar disorder and had a long and troubled history of drug and alcohol abuse. Five months before his death, Strickland was arrested for cocaine possession, pleaded no contest, and was sentenced to three years' probation and ordered into drug rehabilitation. He was due in court for a progress report on the day of his death. News reports of events leading up to Strickland's death suggest that he had chosen to stop taking the lithium he was prescribed to control his bipolar disorder.

== Death ==
On March 20, 1999, Strickland and comedian Andy Dick flew from Los Angeles to Las Vegas and spent three days partying in strip clubs. After checking into a motel, Strickland spent time with a prostitute, consumed six bottles of beer, and then hanged himself with a bed sheet over the ceiling beam. He died during the morning hours of March 22, 1999, at the age of 29. His body was discovered by a private investigator hired by his friend and co-star Brooke Shields when Strickland missed his appearance in Los Angeles Municipal Court for cocaine possession. Evidence of drug use was found in his room. The Clark County Coroner concluded that Strickland's body bore the marks of a previous suicide attempt.

After much discussion, the writers of Suddenly Susan decided to deal with Strickland's death directly by killing off his character, Todd Stites. In the show's third season finale, "A Day in a Life", Todd fails to appear at work one day. When Susan calls Todd regarding tickets to a show, his pager vibrates on his desk. Susan spends the day searching for Todd, learning for the first time about a number of good deeds he had done throughout his life. The episode ends when the police call Jack while he, Susan, and the other characters are gathered in a prayer circle for Todd's well-being. The details of Todd's fate are left ambiguous. The episode is peppered with confessional-style monologues delivered directly into the camera by Shields and the show's supporting cast.

== Filmography ==
Film
| Year | Title | Role | Notes |
|---|---|---|---|
| 1994 | Object of Obsession | Homeless Man | |
| 1994 | Postcards from America | Driver | |
| 1995 | Phobophilia: The Love of Fear | (unknown) | |
| 1999 | Forces of Nature | Steve Montgomery | |
| 1999 | Delivered | Will Sherman | Alternative title: Death by Pizza |

Television
| Year | Title | Role | Notes |
|---|---|---|---|
| 1995 | Dave's World | Police Officer | Episode: "What the Early Bird Gets" |
| 1995 | Roseanne | First Cop | Episode: "The Getaway, Almost" |
| 1995–1996 | Mad About You | Hollis | 6 episodes |
| 1996 | Sister, Sister | Dave Barnes | 3 episodes |
| 1996 | Mixed Nuts | Ross Kellog | Unsold NBC pilot |
| 1996–1999 | Suddenly Susan | Todd Stites | Series regular, 71 episodes |
