= The Package (2012 film) =

2012 direct-to-video action film directed by Jesse V. Johnson

- Theatrical release poster
- Directed by: Jesse V. Johnson
- Written by: Derek Kolstad
- Produced by: Justin Bursch; Brad Krevoy
- Starring: Steve Austin; Dolph Lundgren; Eric Keenleyside; William B. Davis; Jerry Trimble
- Music by: Sean Murray
- Production companies: Motion Picture Corporation of America; Caliber Media Company
- Distributed by: Anchor Bay Films
- Release date: November 1, 2012
- Running time: 95 minutes
- Country: United States
- Language: English
- Box office: $1,469 (US)

The Package is a 2012 American action film directed by Jesse V. Johnson and starring Steve Austin and Dolph Lundgren. The film was shot in Abbotsford, Langley, and Vancouver, British Columbia, Canada, in twenty days from February 14 to March 5, 2012.

== Plot ==
The film starts with Tommy Wicker (Steve Austin), arriving at a bowling alley and beating up a rival for not paying back Big Doug. Afterwards he visits Big Doug who tells him he wants a package delivered to "The German" (Dolph Lundgren), a dangerous crime lord. En route he is pursued by a rival gang who kills his partner and wants what he is carrying, forcing him to fight them off and run.

Eventually Tommy is captured by the rival gang and delivered to Anthony. He kills Anthony and most of the gang, manages to escape, is captured by the German and brought to see if he has compatible DNA with the German. He then breaks free and has a final showdown with the German, killing him. He then wishes Big Doug that the incident be filed away and they wish each other a hearty godspeed. Tommy then calls his wife Darla about the cash and tells her "I love you."

== Cast ==
- Steve Austin as Tommy Wicker
- Dolph Lundgren as "The German"
- Eric Keenleyside as Doug "Big Doug"
- Mike Dopud as Julio
- John Novak as Nicholas
- Kristen Kerr as Darla Wicker
- Darren Shahlavi as Devon
- Paul Wu as Dosan
- Lochlyn Munro as Eddie
- Mark Gibbon as Jake
- Peter Bryant as Ralph
- Monique Ganderton as Monique
- Michael Daingerfield as Anthony
- William B. Davis as Dr. Willhelm
- Jerry Trimble as Carl
- Patrick Sabongui as Luis

== Reception ==
=== Box office ===
The Package debuted at number 81 at the box-office and made $1,469.

=== Critical response ===
The Los Angeles Times gave a favorable review of The Package, calling it an "uncomplicated guy's guy movie time, the screen version of the starchy passing pleasures of bar food." In contrast, DVD Verdict panned the film, calling it mediocre and saying that Austin's fight scenes were "unimaginatively produced and not much fun".
