= Snowglobe (film) =

- Promotional poster
- Written by: Garrett Frawley; Brian Turner
- Directed by: Ron Lagomarsino
- Starring: Christina Milian; Josh Cooke; Matt Keeslar
- Country of origin: United States
- Original language: English

Production
- Producers: Jody Brockway; Craig McNeil
- Running time: 90 minutes
- Budget: $5,000,000(estimated)

Original release
- Network: ABC Family
- Release: December 15, 2007

Snowglobe is a 2007 television film directed by Ron Lagomarsino and starring Christina Milian, Josh Cooke and Matt Keeslar. The film was produced by ABC Family and first aired on December 15, 2007, in their 25 Days of Christmas programming block.

== Plot ==
Angela loves Christmas more than anything. However, her family does not share her love for the holiday at all. When she is about to break down because of her family, she receives a peculiar snowglobe in the mail. When she winds up the snowglobe before going to sleep, she is transported into the world inside, where Christmas is the heart and soul of the kindly, childlike inhabitants. She discovers she can return to her world by going down a small path in the little forest at the edge of the village, and can return whenever she winds up the snowglobe.

After a long set of visits to this dream world, she is secretly followed by snowglobe inhabitant Douglas Holiday, Angela's friend who introduces himself to her family. This is extremely confusing for Angela's relatives, and since Angela does not want to explain to her folks where Douglas comes from, she takes him on a tour of the city. Douglas is delighted because he has never seen so much and is astonished. However, he can not understand the rudeness of some people. The next day Angela asks her neighbor Eddie to take care of Douglas during the day as she also has to go to work on Christmas. Eddie finds Douglas' behavior and naïvety a bit strange, but puts up with it for the sake of Angela. But when Angela comes to her apartment, she not only finds half her family and Douglas, but also Douglas' snowglobe friend Marie, who has also found her way out. Angela tries to tell Douglas and Marie that they need to get back in the globe because that's their home. When Angela shows them the globe and presses the music box, only she is transported inside, and the globe falls to the ground, destroying the windup mechanism. Angela immediately tries to get out, but she is trapped. She is afraid to stay in the mini-world forever and everything that she had liked about it so far, she suddenly finds annoying. Someone takes pity on Angela and she is surprisingly sent a new snow globe. This time her house is in there, and so she comes back to her apartment where Eddie greets her joyfully. Douglas and Marie can also return to their world after Eddie carefully inserts the new ball clock into the old snow globe.

== Cast ==
- Christina Milian as Angela Moreno
- Josh Cooke as Edward "Eddie" Lee
- Matt Keeslar as Douglas Holiday
- Kailin See as Marie Snows
- Christine Willes as Joy Holiday
- Lorraine Bracco as Rose Moreno
- Luciana Carro as Gina Moreno DiBiase
- Ennis Esmer as James "Jamie" Marco DiBiase
- Ron Canada as Antonio "Tony" Moreno
- Erin Karpluk as Claire
- Jason Schombing as Donny Moreno

== Production ==
Snowglobe was filmed in Springbank, and Calgary, Alberta from July to August 2007.

== DVD ==
Snowglobe was released on Region 1 DVD in the United States on October 7, 2008.

== Reception ==
The film received generally favorable reviews. On Netflix, Snowglobe received overwhelming positive user reviews and currently has a rating of 3.8 stars. Additionally, Milian won Best Actress (Television) from the 2008 Imagen Foundation Awards.

== Legacy ==
The film's signature drink Christmas Tree on Fire made by the film's Eddie (played by Josh Cooke) has become a holiday staple for fans of the film. It is mixture of eggnog and either cinnamon schnapps (the first version) or cherry brandy (the second version), as Eddie states "Perfection, Angela, comes in many flavors."

== See also ==
- List of Christmas films
