= Group Sex (film) =

2010 American comedy film by Lawrence Trilling

- Directed by: Lawrence Trilling
- Written by: Lawrence Trilling; Greg Grunberg
- Starring: Josh Cooke; Greg Grunberg; Odette Yustman
- Release date: August 4, 2010
- Running time: 91 minutes
- Country: United States
- Language: English
- Budget: $13 million
- Box office: $38,234,230

Group Sex is a 2010 American comedy film written by Lawrence Trilling and Greg Grunberg. Trilling also directs, while Grunberg co-stars alongside Josh Cooke and Odette Yustman.

== Plot ==
The story begins with two roommates and business partners, Andy and Jerry. Andy hears Vanessa singing at a bar and, lovestruck, follows her to a church, where he realizes she has joined sex addict meetings. To get closer to her, he attempts to fit in with the other sex addicts in the class. He takes on the persona of his sex-crazed roommate, but soon finds his efforts to help his new friends and to woo Vanessa are putting his job and work partnership with Jerry in jeopardy.

== Cast ==
- Josh Cooke as Andy
- Greg Grunberg as Jerry
- Odette Yustman as Vanessa
- Robert Patrick Benedict as Donny
- Kym Whitley as Tiffany
- Tom Arnold as Herman
- Henry Winkler as Burton
- Lombardo Boyar as Ramon (credited as Lomabardo Boyar)
- Kathrine Narducci as Frannie
- Greg Germann as Reeves
- Kurt Fuller as Bloom
- Lisa Lampanelli as Lisa the Waitress
- Sandra Seeling as Eva
- Madeleine Wade as Inge (as Madeleine Lindley)
- Sandra Taylor as Sandy
- Aaron Hill as Imposing Drunk Guy
- Michael Mazzara as Ralph
- Kirk Fox as Sex Addict #1
- Buddy Lewis as Sex Addict #2
- Ilya Jonathan Zaydenberg as Frat Boy with Paddle (credited as Llya Jonathan Zaydenberg)
- Christina DeRosa as Lucy
- James Denton as Luke
