= Geeking Out =

- Genre: Talk show Comedy
- Starring: Kevin Smith; Greg Grunberg
- Country of origin: United States
- No. of seasons: 1
- No. of episodes: 9

Production
- Executive producers: Jerry Carita; Larry Struber; Jay Peterson; Todd Lubin; Patrick Reardon; Brad Savage; Kevin Smith; Greg Grunberg
- Running time: 30 minutes
- Production companies: The Weinstein Company; AMC Networks; Matador Content; Bandwagon Media

Original release
- Network: AMC
- Release: July 24 – October 3, 2016

Geeking Out is an American late night talk show comedy television series co-hosted by Kevin Smith and Greg Grunberg. It premiered on AMC on July 24, 2016, during San Diego Comic-Con.

== Premise ==
Kevin Smith and Greg Grunberg discuss pop culture through a fanboy perspective in this talk show that features celebrity interviews, clips, and out-of-studio segments.

== Cast ==
- Kevin Smith (co-host)
- Greg Grunberg (co-host)
- Tiffany Smith (field correspondent)

== Production ==
In February 2016, Kevin Smith and Greg Grunberg teamed with AMC, The Weinstein Company, and Matador Content to co-host a late night talk show titled Geeking Out which is expected to premiere in July 2016, covering San Diego Comic-Con with 8 subsequent episodes running weekly.

On May 9, 2016, Deadline confirmed that the series would premiere on August 21, 2016, however, it was later revealed that the series would air on July 24, 2016.

On June 9, 2016, Smith revealed that director J. J. Abrams will be a guest on the show.

On July 7, 2016, AMC announced that the first episode will air on July 24, 2016 with hosts Smith and Grunberg heading to San Diego Comic-Con International.

== Episodes ==
No.	Title	Original release date
1	"Comic-Con (R)"	July 24, 2016
Kevin Smith makes a pre-Comic-Con pit-stop in Las Vegas to visit his friend Matt Damon and discuss the eagerly awaited new installment of the Bourne franchise, Jason Bourne. Smith and Grunberg then head to San Diego and give viewers an all-access VIP pass through the convention, including a conversation with Oscar-winning composer Michael Giacchino, who gives Grunberg a preview of Star Trek Beyond IMAX and a first-look at the live orchestra that will perform along with the film. J. J. Abrams, Justin Lin, Simon Pegg, Marjorie Liu, Jim Lee, Garth Ennis, Evan Goldberg, Seth Rogen, Dominic Cooper, Cheo Hodari Coker and Charlie Hunnam are interviewed.
2	"Nathan Fillion / Alan Tudyk / J. J. Abrams"	August 14, 2016
Kevin and Greg talk with Nathan Fillion and Alan Tudyk about their current and past projects. Later, they interview J. J. Abrams at Universal Studios to talk about Westworld.
3	"Jeph Loeb / Charlie Cox"	August 21, 2016
Kevin and Greg talk with Jeph Loeb about overseeing Marvel Television properties. Later, Kevin interviews Charlie Cox about Daredevil.
4	"Jim Lee / Rhett Reese & Paul Wernick"	August 29, 2016
Kevin and Greg talk with the writers of Deadpool. Later, Kevin interviews DC co-publisher Jim Lee about Suicide Squad and DC Rebirth.
5	"Adam Savage / The Flash / Star Trek 50th"	September 5, 2016
Greg builds a prop replica with Adam Savage. Later, Kevin directs The Flash; and Tiffany, Greg and Kevin discuss the 50th anniversary of Star Trek.
6	"Antoine Fuqua / DC Toys / Blizzard Entertainment"	September 12, 2016
Kevin tours DC Direct Toys. Later, Kevin and Greg interview Antoine Fuqua; and Tiffany explores the world of video games at Blizzard Entertainment.
7	"Bryan Cranston / Stranger Things / McFarlane Toys"	September 19, 2016
Greg visits Bryan Cranston. Later, Tiffany and Greg talk to the Stranger Things kids and Tiffany gets a tour of McFarlane Toys with Todd McFarlane.
8	"Mike Colter / Simone Missick . Lucasfilm / Valiant Comics"	September 26, 2016
Kevin and Greg interview Mike Colter and Simone Missick from Luke Cage. Later, Kevin tours Lucasfilm; and Tiffany is on set of Valiant Comics new project.
9	"Robert Kirkman / David Alpert / Greg Nicotero / Kim Dickens"	October 3, 2016
In the first-season finale, Kevin and Greg interview the creative minds behind The Walking Dead. Later, Tiffany and Greg talk with Kim Dickens about Fear the Walking Dead.
