= Marisa Wegrzyn =

American dramatist

Marisa Wegrzyn (born 1981) is an American playwright based in Chicago, Illinois. She won the 2009 Wasserstein Prize for her play Hickorydickory.

== Early life ==
Wegrzyn grew up in Wilmette, Illinois. Born to an anesthesiologist and former flight attendant, she began writing plays at 18. While at Washington University in St. Louis, Wegrzyn won the university's A.E. Hotchner playwriting award after finishing second the preceding year. She came as runner-up as a freshman for Polar Bears on U.S. 41, and was chosen to take part in the WordBRIDGE program. Hosted by Eckerd College in St. Petersburg, Florida, is a two-week program with theatre professionals. The next year, her Killing Women, about female hitmen, won the award and was produced by the university's A.E. Hotchner Play Development Lab. After graduation in 2003, she was put in touch with the Steppenwolf Theatre Company's director of new play development.

== Career ==
Wegrzyn's black comedy The Butcher of Baraboo debuted by Chicago's Steppenwolf Theatre Company in 2006 and ran again at the Second Stage Theater in New York City a year later. The play went on to receive its West Coast premiere in San Diego, CA, in 2009 where it was then hailed by critics as a success. "With its acid blasts of humor and its carnival-fun-house vision of family values, Marisa Wegrzyn's "The Butcher of Baraboo" has a way of leaving people in stitches."-San Diego Union-Tribune

Wegrzyn's one-act Psalms of a Questionable Nature played at Los Angeles' Lucid By Proxy in 2005 to a positive reception. In June 2009, Ten Cent Night opened in Burbank, California and was called a "delightful but messy romp".

She is currently completing two plays commissioned by Steppenwolf and Yale Repertory Theatre.

Wegrzyn's comedy Killing Women will have its New York City premiere in a production that runs from May 13, 2010 - June 5, 2010 at The Beckett Theatre at Theatre Row. Killing Women will be presented by kef theatrical productions, directed by Adam Fitzgerald, and will star Lisa Brescia, Brian Dykstra, Autumn Hurlbert, Adam Kantor, Lori Prince, and Michael Puzzo.

She is a member of the Kilroys, the group that created the Kilroys' List for 2014 and 2015.

== Wasserstein Prize ==
In 2009, Wegrzyn won the third annual Wasserstein Prize for her play Hickorydickory, which had not yet been produced. The award, named in honor of Wendy Wasserstein, is given to a female playwright under 32 who has yet to receive national attention. The award was presented by set designer Heidi Ettinger, a longtime friend of Wasserstein, on December 1, 2009, at The Players.

The script for Hickorydickory, about a watch and clock repair shop in the Chicago suburbs where everyone comes in with a pocket watch saying exactly when they will die, was started in 2004. In addition to a $25,000 prize, the play will receive a staged reading at the Second Stage Theater.
