= Greg Grunberg =

American actor (born 1966)

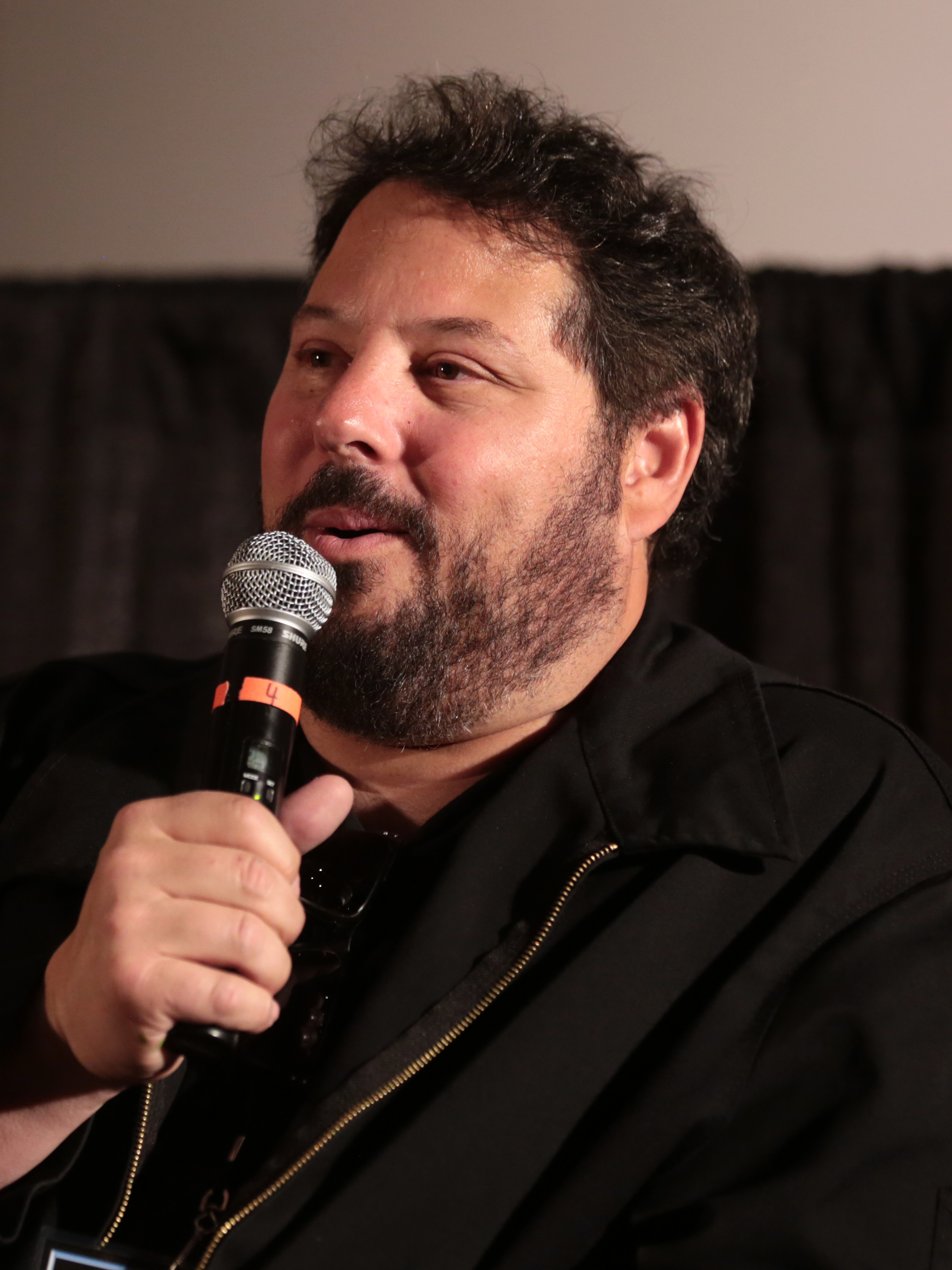
- Grunberg at the 2018 Phoenix Comic Fest
- Born: Gregory Phillip Grunberg; July 11, 1966 (age 60); Los Angeles, California, U.S.
- Occupation: Actor
- Years active: 1990–present
- Spouse: Elizabeth Dawn Wershow (m. 1992)
- Children: 3

Gregory Phillip Grunberg (born July 11, 1966) is an American film and television actor known for starring as Eric Weiss in the ABC series Alias, Matt Parkman in the NBC series Heroes, Temmin "Snap" Wexley in Star Wars: The Force Awakens and Star Wars: The Rise of Skywalker, and Phil in A Star Is Born. He has often appeared in works produced and directed by his childhood friend J. J. Abrams, such as Felicity as Sean Blumberg. He was a recurring cast member in the first two seasons of the Showtime American television drama series Masters of Sex.

== Early life ==
Grunberg was born in Los Angeles, California, the son of Sandy (née Klein) and Gerry Grunberg and had a Jewish upbringing. He attended University High School in West Los Angeles, class of 1984.

== Career ==
Grunberg got his first credited role in Matt Stone and Trey Parker's 1998 film BASEketball. From 1998 to 2002, he appeared as Sean Blumberg on Felicity. He appeared from 2001 to 2006 as Eric Weiss on Alias. He left that series as a regular to star on the NBC sitcom, Grand Union. Since 2003, Abrams had planned a series called The Catch about a bounty hunter, starring Grunberg in the lead role. Suggested for both the 2004–05 and 2005–06 seasons, the series was never produced; however, a pilot episode was shot.

Abrams also cast Grunberg in a brief role as a pilot for the 2004 series Lost. Grunberg returned for the first-season finale, but his scenes were cut for time and were instead included on the season 1 DVD set. He also appeared in a small role in Mission: Impossible III, which Abrams directed.

Grunberg had a major role in the NBC TV show Heroes as telepathic police officer Matt Parkman. He was offered a part in Star Trek, which Abrams directed, but was unable to do so because of scheduling conflicts. In the final film, he voices Kirk's stepfather in the opening sequence. Grunberg voices FBI agent Ethan Thomas in the video game Condemned: Criminal Origins.

Outside of acting, Grunberg is known as one of the creators of the Yowza!! Android and iPhone application, a GPS-aware coupon-referring program. The company was acquired in 2014 by Spindle, a mobile commerce solutions firm.

He also voices Ant-Man in the animated series The Super Hero Squad Show. Grunberg was featured on the May/June 2009 cover of Making Music magazine. On May 17, 2010, Grunberg announced that he would be joining the cast of Love Bites.

He took up a minor role in the 2011 neo-noir detective videogame L.A. Noire, in which he provided both voice and facial motion capture as murder suspect Hugo Moller. On November 7, 2011, he appeared as a guest star on an episode of the TV series Hawaii Five-0 with former Heroes co-star Masi Oka. He also appeared as a special guest star on the March 14, 2012, episode of the TV series Psych.

In 2013, Grunberg appeared in one episode during the first season of the TV series Masters of Sex as the character Gene Moretti, a rich business man. The part was expanded in 2014 to 4 episodes during the second season.

In February 2016, Grunberg co-hosted a late night talk show with Kevin Smith titled Geeking Out on AMC.

Since 2019, Grunberg has been a recurring guest star on the syndicated game show 25 Words or Less.

In 2021, he appeared as a guest star on an episode of 9-1-1: Lone Star in the role of a father fighting for the life of his son, who has epilepsy. This echoes Grunberg's real life activism due to his own son's epilepsy.

== Personal life ==
In 1992, Grunberg married Elizabeth Dawn Wershow. They have three children, one of whom has epilepsy, which has inspired Grunberg to take an active role in raising awareness of the neurological disorder and raising funds for research.

He often organizes charity efforts to raise funds for the Pediatric Epilepsy Project in Los Angeles. In the past, this has included events such as an auction of guitars handpainted by celebrities such as Pink and Grunberg's Alias co-stars Jennifer Garner and Michael Vartan.

In March 2007, Grunberg served as the chair of the first National Walk for Epilepsy, presented by the Epilepsy Foundation.

In 2009, Grunberg launched Talk About It, a website dedicated to epilepsy education and awareness, featuring many of his co-stars and celebrity friends, including Garner, Larter, Pasdar, Ramamurthy, Ventimiglia, and Panettiere, as well as Zachary Quinto, Chris Pine, Drew Pinsky, Ron Rifkin, and John Mayer. The site features Grunberg interviewing top epilepsy experts on the need to talk more about epilepsy, and includes a section for people all over the world to talk about it.

Grunberg was a participant in the first-ever national television advertising campaign supporting donations to Jewish federations. The program featured "film and television personalities celebrating their Jewish heritage and promoting charitable giving to the Jewish community" and included Marlee Matlin, Joshua Malina, Kevin Weisman, and Jonathan Silverman. He made a tongue-in-cheek promotional video for Temple Judea Religious School lambasting "boring" Hebrew Religious schools.

In May 2025, Grunberg revealed he had developed alopecia.

== Filmography ==
=== Film ===
Year	Title	Role	Notes
1993	Witchcraft V: Dance with the Devil	Bartender	
1996	The Pallbearer	Bobby	Uncredited
1997	Picture Perfect	Date #1	Uncredited
1998	BASEketball	Wilke	
1998	Senseless	Steve	
2000	Hollow Man	Carter Abbey	
2002	Austin Powers in Goldmember	Shirtless Fan T	
2003	Malibu's Most Wanted	Brett	
2004	The Ladykillers	TV commercial director	
2004	Connie and Carla	Studio tour guide	
2006	The Darkroom	Bob	
2006	Mission: Impossible III	Kevin	
2009	Star Trek	James T. Kirk's stepfather / Uncle Frank	Brad William Henke originally played Uncle Frank until his scenes were cut for time and Grunberg then redubbed his lines via voice only
2010	Kill Speed	Chief of Police	
2010	Group Sex	Jerry	
2013	Big Ass Spider!	Alex	
2014	Let's Kill Ward's Wife	Bruce	
2015	Underdog Kids	Announcer	
2015	Tales of Halloween	Alex Mathis	
2015	Star Wars: The Force Awakens	Temmin "Snap" Wexley	
2016	Star Trek Beyond	Commander Finnegan	
2018	The Cloverfield Paradox	Joe	Voice
2018	Suicide Squad: Hell to Pay	Steel Maxim	Voice
2018	A Star Is Born	Phil (Jackson's Driver)	
2019	Star Wars: The Rise of Skywalker	Temmin "Snap" Wexley	
2020	Max Reload and the Nether Blasters	Eugene Wylder / MMO Wizard	
2022	The Fabelmans	Bernie Fein	

=== Television ===
Year	Title	Role	Notes
1994	Baywatch	Nightclub Host	
1998	Diagnosis: Murder	Brad Carver	Episode: "The Last Resort"
1998–2002	Felicity	Sean Blumberg	Recurring (season 1); Main (season 2–4): 66 episodes
1999	Rescue 77	Paramedic #2	Episode: "Pilot"
2001	NYPD Blue	Joey Schulman	Season 8, episodes 18,19,20
2001–2006	Alias	Eric Weiss	
2004	The Dead Zone	Frankie Cantrell	
2004, 2010	Lost	Seth Norris (pilot)	
2006	Monk	Jack Leverett	Episode: "Mr. Monk and the Actor"
2006	The Jake Effect	Nick Case	
2006	House	Ronald Neuberger	Episode: "Sex Kills"
2006–2010	Heroes	Matt Parkman	
2008–2009	Head Case	Himself	
2009	The Super Hero Squad Show	Ant-Man	Voice, recurring role
2009	Robot Chicken	Odin	Voice, episode: "Dear Consumer"
2010	Bond of Silence	Detective Paul Jackson	TV film
2011	Love Bites	Judd Rousher	
2011	ISSUES	The Dark Kodiak	Webseries
2011	Hawaii Five-0	Agent Jeff Morrison	Guest (season 2), episode 8
2012	Psych	Jay	Guest (season 6), episode 12
2012	Ultimate Spider-Man	Ben Parker	Voice, episode: "Strange"
2012–2013	The Client List	Dale	Recurring
2012	Baby Daddy	Ray Wheeler	
2012	How to Rock	Principal Kersey	Episode: "How to Rock a Uniform"
2013	End of the World	Owen Stokes	Television film
2013–2014	Masters of Sex	Gene Moretti	
2014	Hell's Kitchen	Himself	Dining room guest in "18 Chefs Compete"
2015	The Haunting of... Greg Grunberg	Himself	Documentary TV series (season 5), episode 1
2015	Criminal Minds	Chris Callahan	
2015–2016	Heroes Reborn	Matt Parkman	Miniseries
2016–2017	Life in Pieces	Mikey	2 episodes
2016	Geeking Out	Himself	Co-host
2016–2017	The Flash	Tom Patterson	2 episodes
2017	Pawn Stars	Himself	Episode: "La La Land"
2018	Paterno	Scott Paterno	TV film
2018	Rapunzel's Tangled Adventure	William	Voice, episode: "Vigor the Visionary"
2019	Castle Rock	Boucher	
2020	The Boys	Himself	1 episode
2021	The Simpsons	Bad Robot's Head of Security	Voice, episode: "Do Pizza Bots Dream of Electric Guitars"
2021	9-1-1: Lone Star	George	Episode: "One Day"
2021	Goliath	Greg Wetzel	Episode: "The Pain Killer"
2021	The Rookie	Larry "Badger" Macer	Episode: "New Blood" (2021); "Backstabbers" (2022)
2022	Law & Order: Special Victims Unit	Detective Mark McDaniels	Episode: "A Better Person"
2025	Duster	Nathan Abbott	Main role
2026	How To Catch a Dirtbag	-	Documentary TV series Producer

=== Video games ===
Year	Title	Role	Notes
2005	Condemned: Criminal Origins	Ethan Thomas	
2007	TimeShift	Commander Mason Cooke	
2010	Halo: Reach	Trooper 2	
2011	L.A. Noire	Hugo Moller	
2016	Lego Star Wars: The Force Awakens	Temmin "Snap" Wexley	
2022	Lego Star Wars: The Skywalker Saga	Temmin "Snap" Wexley	

=== Music video ===
Year	Title	Role	Notes
2018	Have It All	Principal (uncredited)	Song by Jason Mraz
