= DWT =

DWT may stand for:

- Discrete wavelet transform, a mathematical procedure in numerical analysis and functional analysis
- Driving while texting, the act of composing, sending, or reading text messages, email, or making other similar use of the internet on a mobile device, while operating a motor vehicle, such as an automobile, truck or train.
- Dry weight
- D'Arcy Wentworth Thompson, a scholar
- Deadweight tonnage, an expression of a ship's carrying capacity, including the weight of the crew, passengers, cargo, fuel, ballast, drinking water, and stores.
- Deep Web Technologies, a software company that specializes in mining the deep Web
- Detroit–Windsor Tunnel, a highway connecting Michigan with Ontario
- Drowned World Tour, a 2001 concert tour by American entertainer Madonna
- Davis Wright Tremaine, a national business and litigation law firm representing clients in the United States and in China.
- Dangerous World Tour, a 1992–93 concert tour by Michael Jackson
- Dorset Wildlife Trust, a wildlife trust covering the county of Dorset, United Kingdom
- Diamonds World Tour, a concert tour by Rihanna
- Dangerous Woman Tour, a 2017 concert tour by Ariana Grande

dwt may refer to:

- Pennyweight, a unit of mass used in measuring the weight of gold

.dwt is a file extension used by several programs, including:

- Adobe Dreamweaver Template
- Dynamic Web Template, a Microsoft FrontPage feature
- AutoCAD Template/Prototype
