= Super Bowl LVII halftime show =

Event during the 2023 Super Bowl

- Part of: Super Bowl LVII
- Date: February 12, 2023
- Location: Glendale, Arizona, United States
- Venue: State Farm Stadium
- Headliner: Rihanna
- Sponsor: Apple Music
- Director: Hamish Hamilton
- Producer: Jesse Collins; Roc Nation

Super Bowl halftime show chronology
LVI (2022)	LVII (2023)	LVIII (2024)

The Super Bowl LVII halftime show, officially known as the Apple Music Super Bowl LVII Halftime Show, was the halftime entertainment of Super Bowl LVII, which took place on February 12, 2023, at State Farm Stadium in Glendale, Arizona. It featured Barbadian singer Rihanna as the headline performer. It was televised nationally in the U.S. by Fox, Fox Deportes, and the Fox Sports and NFL apps, and was the first Super Bowl halftime show to be sponsored by Apple Music. Reaching over 121 million concurrent viewers, it was the 2nd most-watched Super Bowl halftime show until the record would be broken two years later. Rihanna was pregnant during the performance. The show won two awards out of five nominations at the 75th Primetime Creative Arts Emmy Awards.

== Background and overview ==
In October 2019, Bajan singer Rihanna revealed to Vogue that she had turned down an offer from the National Football League (NFL) to perform at the Super Bowl LIII halftime show in solidarity with Colin Kaepernick. In 2016, Kaepernick knelt during the national anthem at the start of NFL games in protest of police brutality and racial inequality in the United States. He later filed a grievance against the NFL and its owners in November 2017, accusing them of colluding to keep him out of the league. Kaepernick withdrew the grievance in February 2019, ahead of Super Bowl LIII, after reaching a confidential settlement with the NFL.

On September 22, 2022, the NFL announced that the new naming rights sponsor for the Super Bowl halftime show would be Apple Music starting with Super Bowl LVII, replacing sponsor Pepsi, which had sponsored the previous ten halftime shows. Some media reports alleged on social media that American singer-songwriter Taylor Swift would be the headlining performer, based on her associations with Apple and traditional Pepsi rival, Coca-Cola. Subsequently, various outlets reported that Swift had turned down the offer, claiming that she would not do the halftime show until her re-recording process was complete.

On September 25, 2022, the NFL announced that Rihanna would headline the halftime show. The performance would be Rihanna's first live performance in five years since appearing at the 60th Annual Grammy Awards in 2018. In an interview with Apple Music's Nadeska Alexis, several days before the halftime show, Rihanna said she was on the 39th version of the show's set list. In the days leading up to the halftime show, Rihanna teased in an interview with Nate Burleson that she might bring out a "surprise" guest. It was confirmed following the show that she was pregnant with her second child.

Roc Nation, co-founded by Jay-Z and current CEO Desiree Perez among others, produced the Super Bowl LVII halftime show alongside Jesse Collins. Jay-Z, Perez, Collins, Dionne Harmon, Jay Brown, Dave Meyers, Aaron B. Cooke, Roger Goodell, and Rihanna were all nominated to receive an Emmy Award for Outstanding Variety Special (Live) for their roles in the Super Bowl LVII halftime performance.

== Reception ==
Chris Richards of The Washington Post believed Rihanna "made the biggest show of her life look easy". Rating it 5 stars out of five, Mark Beaumont of The Independent recounted the gig as "a roaring success". Jason Lamphier of Entertainment Weekly called it a "low-stakes return" for Rihanna, offering a "slick, chic, serviceable survey of some of pop's best offerings of the past two decades."

The Daily Beast's Coleman Spilde argued "Rihanna's performance may not have had the same level of spectacle as her peers, but it was distinctly Rihanna. She let the world move around her, showing off decades of power and influence like she was simply clocking into work." Rolling Stone's Rob Sheffield praised Rihanna for "being a boss and a half on her flying stage, reigning supreme" without any guests or surprises. However, he wrote that "two consecutive Kanye songs", "All of the Lights" and "Run This Town" felt "mighty strange". Steven McIntosh of BBC News wrote "The singer rattled through several recognisable hits, front-loading her set with some of her most danceable and up-tempo numbers including 'Only Girl (In The World)' and the excellent 'Where Have You Been'. It was a half-time show not short on spectacle, even once she had been lowered to the ground."

In a review for The New York Times, Adrian Horton argued "Rihanna — one of the crucial pop hitmakers of the 21st century — needs the Super Bowl less than the Super Bowl needs her, and her performance was a master class in doing exactly enough." The San Diego Union-Tribune's George Varga opined that the show was "more a triumph of choreography" than music, adding that "Rihanna crammed so many songs — make that, parts of songs — into her set that few of them had a chance to breathe, let alone gain traction and take flight." At NJ.com, Bobby Olivier criticized some of the setlist choices and felt Rihanna lacked showmanship, opining that "this halftime show will go down as one of the lamest offerings in recent memory."

=== Select critical rankings for Super Bowl LVII Halftime Show ===
Publication	List	Rank	Ref.
The Athletic	Super Bowl halftime shows ranked	3	
The A.V. Club	Every Super Bowl Halftime Show from the last three decades, ranked	15	
Billboard	The 14 Best Super Bowl Halftime Shows	11	
Digital Trends	The 10 best Super Bowl halftime shows ever, ranked	8	
Entertainment Weekly	The 15 best Super Bowl halftime shows, ranked	5	
Rolling Stone	Every Super Bowl Halftime Show, Ranked From Worst to Best	8	
The Independent	The 10 greatest Super Bowl halftime shows of all time	9	
Time Out	Best Super Bowl Halftime Shows Of All Time	8	

== Awards and nominations ==
Award	Date of ceremony	Category	Nominee(s)	Result	Ref.
Primetime Emmy Awards	January 6–7, 2024	Outstanding Variety Special (Live)	Shawn Carter, Desiree Perez, Jesse Collins, Dionne Harmon, Jay Brown, Dave Meyers, Aaron B. Cooke, Roger Goodell, Rihanna	Nominated	
Primetime Emmy Awards	January 6–7, 2024	Outstanding Directing for a Variety Special	Hamish Hamilton and Shawn Carter	Won	
Primetime Emmy Awards	January 6–7, 2024	Outstanding Music Direction	Adam Blackstone and Omar Edwards	Nominated	
Primetime Emmy Awards	January 6–7, 2024	Outstanding Production Design for a Variety Special	Bruce Rodgers, Shelley Rodgers, Lindsey Breslauer, Lily Rodgers and Maria Garcia	Won	
Primetime Emmy Awards	January 6–7, 2024	Outstanding Technical Direction and Camerawork For A Special	Eric Becker, David Alfano, Rob Balton, Danny Bonilla, Kary D'Alessandro, Keith Dicker, Sean Flannery, Kevin French, Shaun Harkins, Helena Jackson, Tayler Knight, Toré Livia, Allen Merriweather, Eann Potter, Jofre Rosero, Keyan Safyari, Casey Roche, Christopher Rybitski, and Rod Wardell	Nominated	

== Commercial impact ==
Rihanna's performance attained more than 121 million viewers across TV and digital platforms, overtaking the NBC airing of Katy Perry's Super Bowl XLIX halftime show (2015) to become the most-watched halftime show in U.S. television history and marking the first time since the latter to record consecutive years of Super Bowl halftime show and overall game viewership increase. In comparison, the Super Bowl telecast as a whole had an average viewership of 115.1 million, the largest average audience for any U.S. television broadcast.

Following the performance, Billboard reported that Rihanna's song catalogue received a leap of 140% across all on-demand streaming services in the US. On February 12–13, her songs received 62.2 million on-demand official streams nationwide. Sales-wise, she sold 42,000 downloads in the US during those two days. "Umbrella" and "Diamonds" were Rihanna's most streamed songs following the performance, with 3.8 million and 3.2 million streams on February 12–13 respectively. In the week ending February 16, Luminate reported that Rihanna had earned 166.13 million on-demand streams in the US across her full song catalogue. In doing so, she has received her best streaming week in the country ever. As a result of that, several of her songs re-entered the US Billboard Hot 100 chart, including "Umbrella" at number 37, "Diamonds" at number 44, and "We Found Love" charted at number 48.

The same week, Rihanna's studio albums sold a total of 142,000 album-equivalent units in the country. For the week dated February 25, five of Rihanna's albums charted within the top 50 of the US Billboard 200 chart. Anti (2016) charted at number eight and managed to earn 36,000 equivalent albums in the country, 166% up, according to Luminate. Furthermore, Good Girl Gone Bad (2007) charted at number 15, Unapologetic (2012) at number 18, Loud (2010) at number 26, and Talk That Talk (2011) at number 49. With this feat, Rihanna became only the seventh act to place at least five albums in the top 50 on the Billboard 200 in the last 50 years.

In the week following the performance, Rihanna's albums Good Girl Gone Bad and Anti re-entered the top 50 of the Australian Albums Chart at number 32 and 35, respectively. The same week, both of the albums also re-entered the UK Albums Chart; Anti at number 39 and Good Girl Gone Bad at number 42. Additionally, Loud charted at number 81. On the Norwegian Albums Chart four of Rihanna's albums charted within the top 40 that same week, including Anti at number 19, Unapologetic at number 27, Good Girl Gone Bad: Reloaded (2008) at number 36 and Loud at number 40.

== Set list ==
Setlist adapted from Today and Bustle.

1. "Bitch Better Have My Money" (contains elements of "Phresh Out the Runway")
2. "Where Have You Been" / "Only Girl (In the World)" (contains elements of "Cockiness (Love It)")
3. "We Found Love" (contains elements of "S&M")
4. "Rude Boy" (DJ Klean remix; contains elements of "Kiss It Better" and "We Found Love")
5. "Work"
6. "Wild Thoughts"
7. "Pour It Up" (contains elements of "Birthday Cake", "Numb" and "Pose")
8. "All of the Lights"
9. "Run This Town"
10. "Umbrella"
11. "Diamonds"
