= Cold Case Love =

Song by Rihanna

from the album Rated R
- Recorded: 2009
- Studio: German, Roc the Mic (New York City); Westlake (Los Angeles)
- Genre: R&B
- Length: 6:04
- Label: Def Jam; SRP
- Songwriters: Justin Timberlake; Robin Tadross; James Fauntleroy II
- Producers: The Y's; Makeba Riddick

Audio video
- "Cold Case Love" on YouTube

"Cold Case Love" is a song recorded by Barbadian singer Rihanna for her fourth studio album, Rated R (2009). It was written and produced by The Y's (Justin Timberlake, Robin Tadross and James Fauntleroy II). Following Chris Brown's assault on Rihanna, she started working on the sound of her new album. Timberlake, who co-wrote "Cold Case Love", labeled the sound of Rihanna's new project as a step forward for the singer. In February 2010, Rihanna admitted that the song's lyrics are about her complicated relationship with Brown.

An R&B song, "Cold Case Love" has an instrumentation infused with a simple piano pattern, thumping bassline, violin and viola strings and electric guitar licks. Lyrically, it is a "melancholic and mature farewell" to a failed relationship. "Cold Case Love" received acclaim from contemporary music critics who labeled the song as a highlight on Rated R and additionally praised Rihanna's vocals. The singer performed the song on her 2013 worldwide concert tour, Diamonds World Tour, in a medley with "Take a Bow" and "Hate That I Love You".

== Background and production ==
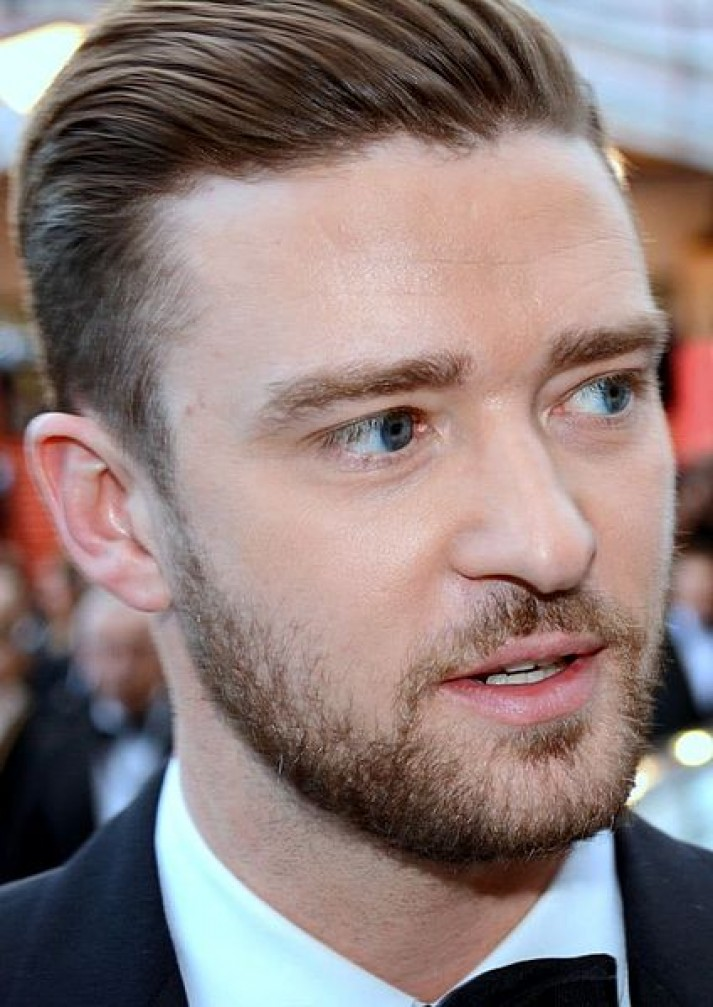
Timberlake who co-wrote "Cold Case Love", in an interview with MTV News, revealed that the new material of Rated R is different and represents a step forward for Rihanna.

Following the assault of Rihanna's boyfriend Chris Brown on her, there was much speculation as to whether any song featured on the upcoming album would be about him. Producer Chuck Harmony mused that no matter what song Rihanna released as the lead single from the record, it would immediately be looked at as referring to Brown. During an interview with Marc Malkin at the MTV Video Music Awards, American singer-songwriter Ne-Yo stated that listeners should expect an "edgier" and "angrier" Rihanna on the album. He later told In Touch Weekly that the album is definitely more menacing than Rihanna's prior work, describing the album as "liberated". The album was released under the title Rated R in November 2009.

"Cold Case Love" was written and produced by The Y's (Justin Timberlake, Robin Tadross and James Fauntleroy II). At the "Justin Timberlake & Friends Concert in Las Vegas", Timberlake told MTV News that Rated R is a whole new sound and that the new songs are not just a rehash of what fans heard on her last album. "She broke onto the scene so hard with the last record — to have that many songs on the charts is impressive. I think that the smartest thing she's doing is not trying to emulate what she did but move forward", Timberlake explained. In February 2010, Rihanna admitted that "Cold Case Love" was inspired by her difficult relationship with ex-boyfriend Chris Brown, "It's a song that everybody wanted to hear, everything that I didn't say for the past eight months, exactly how I felt about that relationship and how I feel about it now – that song says it all." When asked what the most important song from the album to her was, she stated that she doesn't have one, however, Rihanna cited "Cold Case Love" together with "Fire Bomb" as her favorites.

Makeba Riddick provided the vocal production of the song. "Cold Case Love" was recorded by Marcos Tovar and Paul Foley at the German Studios and Roc the Mic Studios in New York City and Westlake Recording Studios in Los Angeles. Bobby Campbell and Kevin Porter served as Tovar's assistant recording engineers, while Antonio Resendiz and Peter Martinez helped Foley. Jean Marie Horvat mixed the song at the Palms Studio in Las Vegas, with Foley serving as a mixing assistant. The engineering was completed by Jeff Chestek, with Montez Roberts and Rick Friedrich serving as assistant engineer. The cello was played by Glenn Fischbach and James J. Cooper III, while the viola was provided by Davis Barnett and Peter Nocella. The violins were played by Charles Parker, Emma Kummrow, Gregory Teperman, Igor Szwec, Luigi Mazzocchi and Olga Konopelsky. John Epcar provided the drums, while Mike Elizondo played the guitar. Larry Gold was the strings arranger and conductor.

== Composition and lyrical interpretation ==
"Cold Case Love"
A sample of "Cold Case Love", an R&B song that features an instrumentation" consisted of simple piano pattern, thumping bassline, violin and viola strings and electric guitar licks.

"Cold Case Love" is an R&B ballad that lasts for a duration of six minutes and four seconds. It contains an instrumentation infused with a simple piano pattern, thumping bassline, violin and viola strings and electric guitar licks. According to Kitty Empire of The Observer, "Cold Case Love" takes six minutes to "arc from a riveting short story for vocal, organ and life-support machine" into a "denouement laden with an actual living string section". It has a fluid melody and easier production which according to Jim Farber of Daily News, allows Rihanna "to fully emote, to show the feeling behind the stance".

"Cold Case Love" starts with a sparse melody and gradually builds through each verse before it culminates with a full production flourish. The Boston Globe's Sarah Rodman wrote that Timberlake manages to build a wall of sound, from simple voice and quavering organ to full "strings-beatbox-kitchen-sink melodrama". According to Will Welch of GQ "Cold Case Love" is a combination of the works by Phil Collins and Lionel Richie and Timberlake's song "Losing My Way" (FutureSex/LoveSounds, 2006). Sean Fennessey wrote that on the song Rihanna seems to discover the "flip" side of her 2007 single "Umbrella".

Lyrically, the song is a "melancholic and mature farewell" to a failed relationship. Jody Rosen of Rolling Stone wrote Rihanna "slow-boiling" interprets the line "What you did to me was a crime". According to Jude Rogers of BBC Music the lyrics of the song hint towards her failed relationship with Brown. A reviewer of Plugged In (publication) wrote that the lyrics that allude to this are "And I let you reach me one more time/But that’s enough." According to the reviewer, she later admits that the she was blind by her emotional confusion, "your love ain’t the kind you can keep." Jon Pareless of The New York Times wrote that Rihanna compares her love to a crime scene in the "elegiac" "Cold Case Love" which features the couplet "Prints, pictures and white outlines / Are all that's left at the scene of a cold case love".

== Reception ==
Kitty Empire of The Observer wrote that while most R&B ballads are woeful, "Cold Case Love" "at least has the wit to sustain a plot". About.com's Bill Lamb declared Rihanna's vocals to be among the "most beautiful" she has recorded and noted that "they are in the service of a very dark, bleak statement". HitFix reviewer Melinda Newman wrote that it is impossible to listen to the song and not filter it through "that horrific context whether that is how they are meant to be heard or not". Both Newman and Benjamin Boles of Now cited "Cold Case Love" as a highlight of Rated R.

Leah Greenblatt of Entertainment Weekly stated, "A genuine moment of vulnerability plays stunningly on the meticulously layered 'Cold Case Love'". Writing for GQ, Will Welch declared the song as a "sweeping, grandiose, almost ludicrously over-stuffed and endless album closer". He wrote that the song is "epic, evocative, on-message (eat shit, Chris Brown) and just plain catchy". Welch cited "Cold Case Love" as his favorite song on the album, while a reviewer for Rap-Up declared it, alongside "Wait Your Turn", "Hard" and "Rude Boy", as their favorite song from the album. Writing for Complex magazine, out of 26 Rihanna songs, Claire Lobenfeld placed the song at number 24 and compared it to the material present on Timberlake's 2006 studio album, FutureSex/LoveSounds.

== Live performances ==
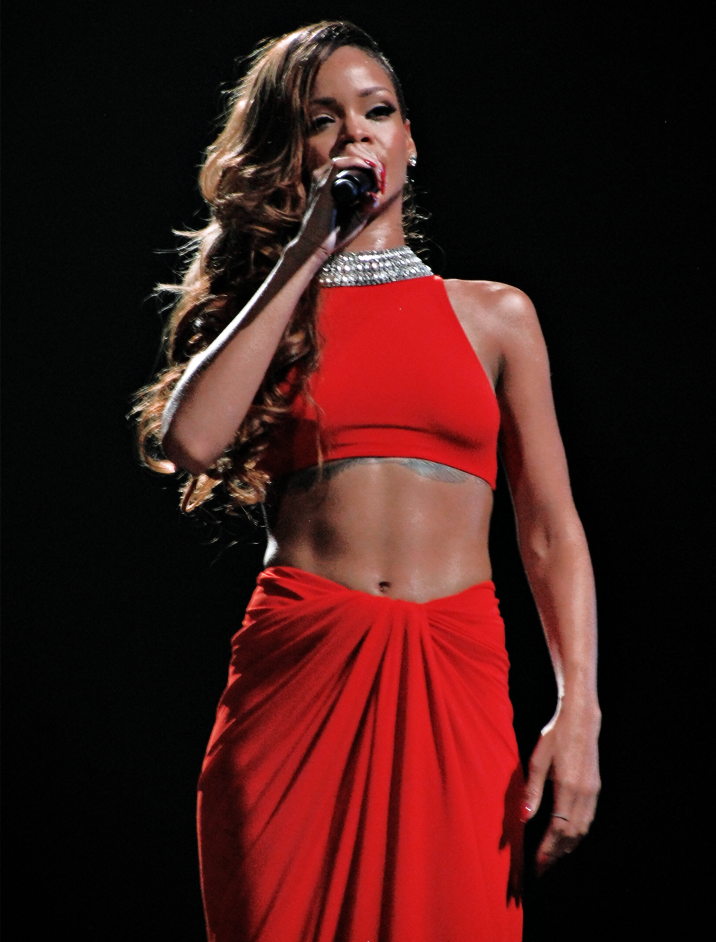
Rihanna performing "Cold Case Love" during the Diamonds World Tour

Rihanna performed "Cold Case Love" at her 2013 worldwide concert tour, the Diamonds World Tour, in a medley with "Take a Bow" and "Hate That I Love You". Natasha of HipHopCanada in a review of the concert in Toronto, wrote that during the set she "let out her softer side" and that her vocals were "exceptionally clear and strong". Reviewing the concert in Los Angeles, Rick Florino of Artistdirect wrote, "Scaling everything back momentarily, she emerged from the center of the stage in a stunning red dress for soaring renditions of 'Love the Way You Lie (Part II)', 'Take a Bow', and 'Cold Case Love' flowing within a perfect melody of hits." In a review of the Ottawa concert on May 2, 2013, Aedan Helmer of Ottawa Sun wrote that "diva RiRi" was "crooning" during the set consisted of songs such as "Loveeeeeee Song", "Take a Bow" and "Cold Case Love"; according to Helmer those were the tracks describing her "tumultuous" relationship with Brown.

== Credits and personnel ==
Locations

- Vocals recorded at German Studios and Roc the Mic Studios, New York City, New York; Westlake Studios, Los Angeles, California.
- Mixed at the Palm Studios, Las Vegas, Nevada.

Personnel

- Songwriting – Justin Timberlake, Robin Tadross, James Fauntleroy II
- Production – The Y's
- Vocal production – Makeba Riddick
- Recording engineers – Marcos Tovar, Paul Foley
- Assistant recording engineers – Bobby Campbell, Kevin Porter, Antonio Resendiz, Peter Martinez
- Mixing – Jean Marie Horvat
- Mixing assistant – Paul Foley
- Engineering – Jeff Chestek
- Assistant Engineering – Montez Roberts, Rick Friedrich
- Cello – Glenn Fischbach, James J. Cooper III
- Viola – Davis Barnett, Peter Nocella
- Violin – Charles Parker, Emma Kummrow, Gregory Teperman, Igor Szwec, Luigi Mazzocchi, Olga Konopelsky
- Drums – John Epcar
- Guitar – Mike Elizondo
- Strings arranger and conductor – Larry Gold

Credits adapted from the liner notes of Rated R.
