= Diamonds World Tour =

2013 concert tour by Rihanna

- Tour by Rihanna
- Promotional poster for the tour
- Associated album: Unapologetic
- Start date: March 8, 2013
- End date: November 15, 2013
- Legs: 5
- No. of shows: 96
- Supporting acts: A$AP Rocky; GTA; HAIM; David Guetta; Dizzee Rascal; 2 Chainz
- Box office: $140.1 million ($193.64 in 2025 dollars)

Rihanna concert chronology
- Loud Tour (2011); Diamonds World Tour (2013); The Monster Tour (2014)

The Diamonds World Tour was the fifth concert tour by Barbadian singer Rihanna. It was launched in support of her seventh studio album Unapologetic (2012). The tour began on 8 March 2013 in Buffalo, New York and concluded on 15 November of the same year in New Orleans, Louisiana. The tour visited the Americas, Europe, Asia, Africa, and Australia with 96 shows in total. This was Rihanna's first Australian tour since the February 2011 with The Last Girl On Earth Tour, and her first tour in Asia and Africa since 2008 with the Good Girl Gone Bad Tour.

The set list for the concerts included songs from a selection of Rihanna's studio albums; the Diamonds World Tour includes five acts and an encore. Rihanna's outfits were designed by a variety of designers including Riccardo Tisci of Givenchy, Raf Simons of Christian Dior and Alber Elbaz, footwear was designed by French fashion line Christian Louboutin and Manolo Blahnik. The tour featured support acts including 2 Chainz, ASAP Rocky, David Guetta, and Haim among others.

The tour was met with praise from critics who noted artistic growth. Commercially, the Diamonds World Tour was a success, with extra dates added due to high demand. The tour grossed $137,982,530 (USD) from 87 shows according to Billboard magazine and was the fifth highest grossing worldwide tour of 2013. Rihanna broke numerous records during the tour: she become the youngest artist to ever headline a sold-out show at France's National Stadium (at the age of 25); the youngest artist to have sold-out shows held at Millennium Stadium and Twickenham Stadium in the UK; and the first female and youngest artist to sell out the FNB Stadium in Johannesburg, South Africa.

== Background ==
On September 7, following the singer's performance at the 2012 MTV Video Music Awards, she announced that she will embark on her fourth worldwide tour entitled the Diamonds World Tour, to support her then upcoming album. Rihanna's managing company Live Nation Entertainment posted a video on YouTube with the announcement of the North American dates of the tour. The tickets for the concert shows were made available a week later on September 14, 2012. She will bring her tour to 27 cities in North America during two months. On Wednesday, November 14, 2012, Rihanna revealed the European dates. The singer will tour Europe for two months between late May and late July 2013, taking in the UK during June. A few dates were announced a few days later the official European announcement although they said: more shows are expected to be announced. On March 13, 2013, the Australian dates were confirmed.

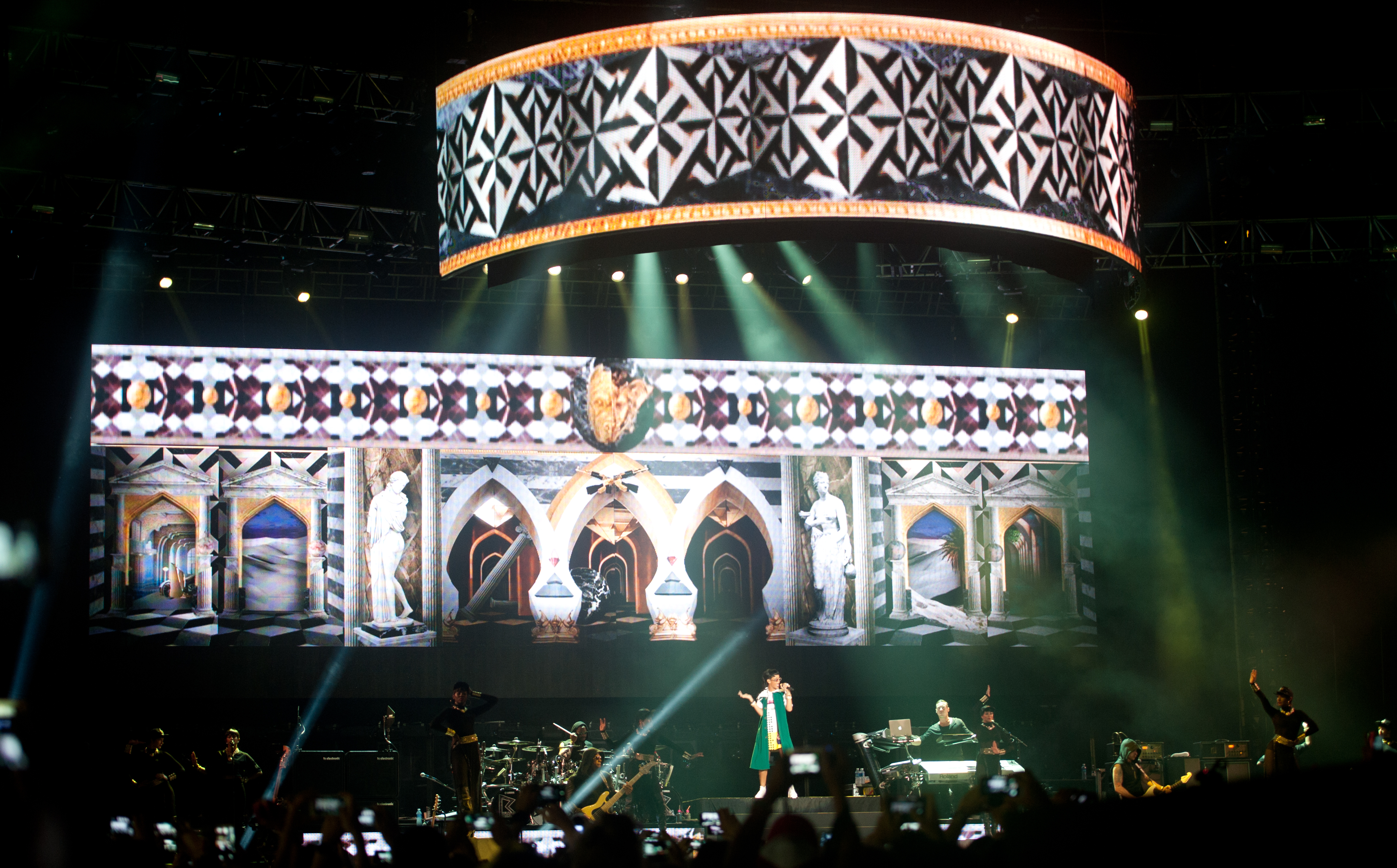
A view of the stage during Rihanna's performance in Singapore on September 22, 2013

In early March 2013, via her official YouTube channel, Rihanna posted a series of videos regarding the preparations for the tour. The first video featured the dancers auditions for the tour in which contestants applied to participate on the tour. They perform several dance sequences for Rihanna and her team while they are auditioning. She posted the second video on March 2, 2013, in which the crew is preparing the outfits for Rihanna, the dancers and the backup singers. Marley Glassroth who served as a costume builder, explained that the theme of the outfits is different for every section of the show, "There is a little bit of rock n' roll, there is a little bit of sexy... everything." The stylist assistant, Jahleel Weaver, also spoke and concluded that the most difficult process of the costume creation is making "the storming ideas" reality and further described the show as "dope".

A day later, she posted a third video in which the tour crew describes how the stage will be set up for every show. The production assistant of the stage, Cody Osborne explained that he worked on it probably for over 18 million hours and he hopes it will work. Scenes are intercut with people building the stage up together. Joe Sanchez, who serves as a production manager, stated that he started designing it since last year and it has been in construction for five weeks. He also said that it will take a team crew of over 58 people to construct and over 100 local people crew to turn it down the stage on every show. Sanchez said that the show is more complex than the previous tours by Rihanna. On March 4, another video was posted on the singer's channel in which she rehearsal's for the dance routine of "Pour It Up" together with the choreographer. According to the latter, "this routine gives you the feeling like a stripper-slash hood choreography, that's the type of energy, that's the type where your mind will be ported." The next day, a video of the "Run Through First Look" was uploaded in which Rihanna approved the stage lighting and video content. On March 6 a video where the singer and her dancers are doing the video photo shoot was uploaded, before finally the next day, the last video where Rihanna and her crew are making the last rehearsal before leaving for the first show in Buffalo, New York was posted.

== Fashion ==
To support her performances, Rihanna appeared in several different outfits on the stage. The outfit for the opening of the show was created by Italian fashion designer Riccardo Tisci for Givenchy. It features a masculine oversized black printed and hand embroidered parka, which channels his signature mix of streetwear and Haute Couture. Under the parka, there was a black and white leather bra and a gold star embellishments, a sheer black silk shirt, gold embroidered satin shorts, and a gold shark tooth necklace engraved with the singer's name: "RIRI". In an interview for Women's Wear Daily, Tisci said, "Rihanna represents what young and amazing means today. She is punk and talented. She offers intelligence, energy and pure beauty. She is the face of her generation." According to a representative from Givenchy, the costume is a symbol of "female empowerment and urban haute couture elegance." Tisci further contributed to a dark floor-length black cape, a printed parka with gold bullet motifs, and an energetic pink-and-neon dress paired with holographic kicks.

Belgian fashion designer Raf Simons and the creative director at Christian Dior, also collaborated with the singer and created a sheer black dress with white Rihanna x Raf Simons text on both sides of the item paired with shorts, and white python custom Christian Louboutin boots. According to Hilary Moss of New York magazine, both the boots [cargo pants] and the sunglasses which were worn with the outfit drew inspirations from the style of the nineties. Her personal costume designer Adam Selman also designed some of the outfits including a red halter and wrap-around skirt wore for the ballads section and a red, white and yellow color-block bustier with matching leather pants and Manolo Blahnik snakeskin boots. He also designed a dollar bill hologram dress combined with metallic Pierre Hardy high-tops. The jewelry for the Adam Selman looks was designed by Lynn Ban. Regarding Rihanna, Selman spoke to New York Daily News, "Her body is so insane. It's the dream body to make clothes for. You don't have to try as hard." For the encore, Rihanna wore an Alber Elbaz created jumpsuit that made visible her chest tattoo of goddess Isis. The singer's personal stylist Mel Ottenberg, describe the outfits for the show in general as "a very Thug Life Tupac mixed with nineties candy raver".

== Synopsis ==
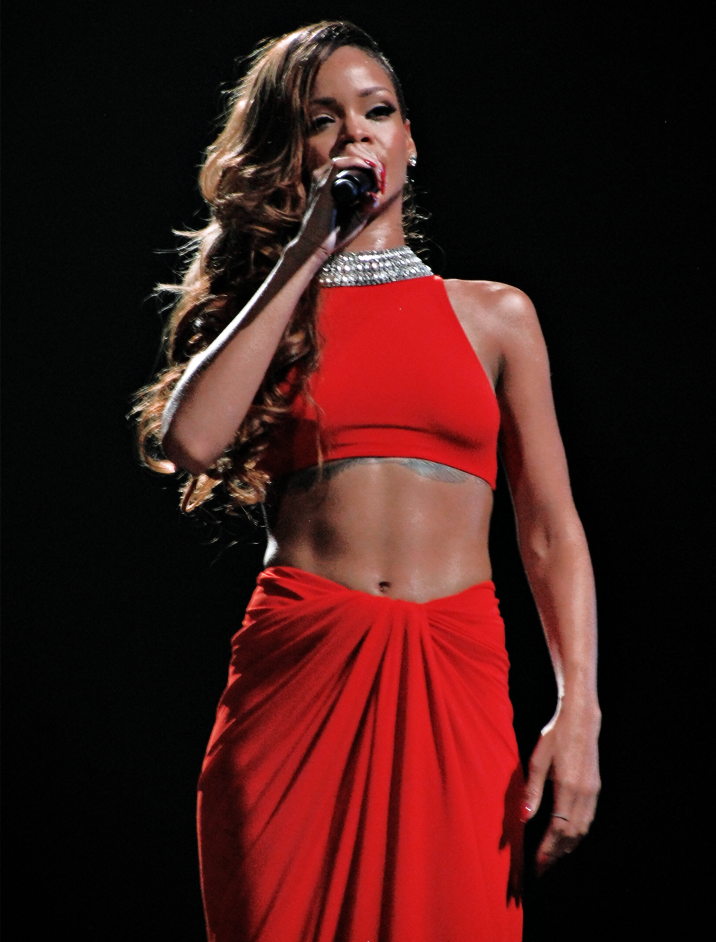
Rihanna performing during the fourth act of the show

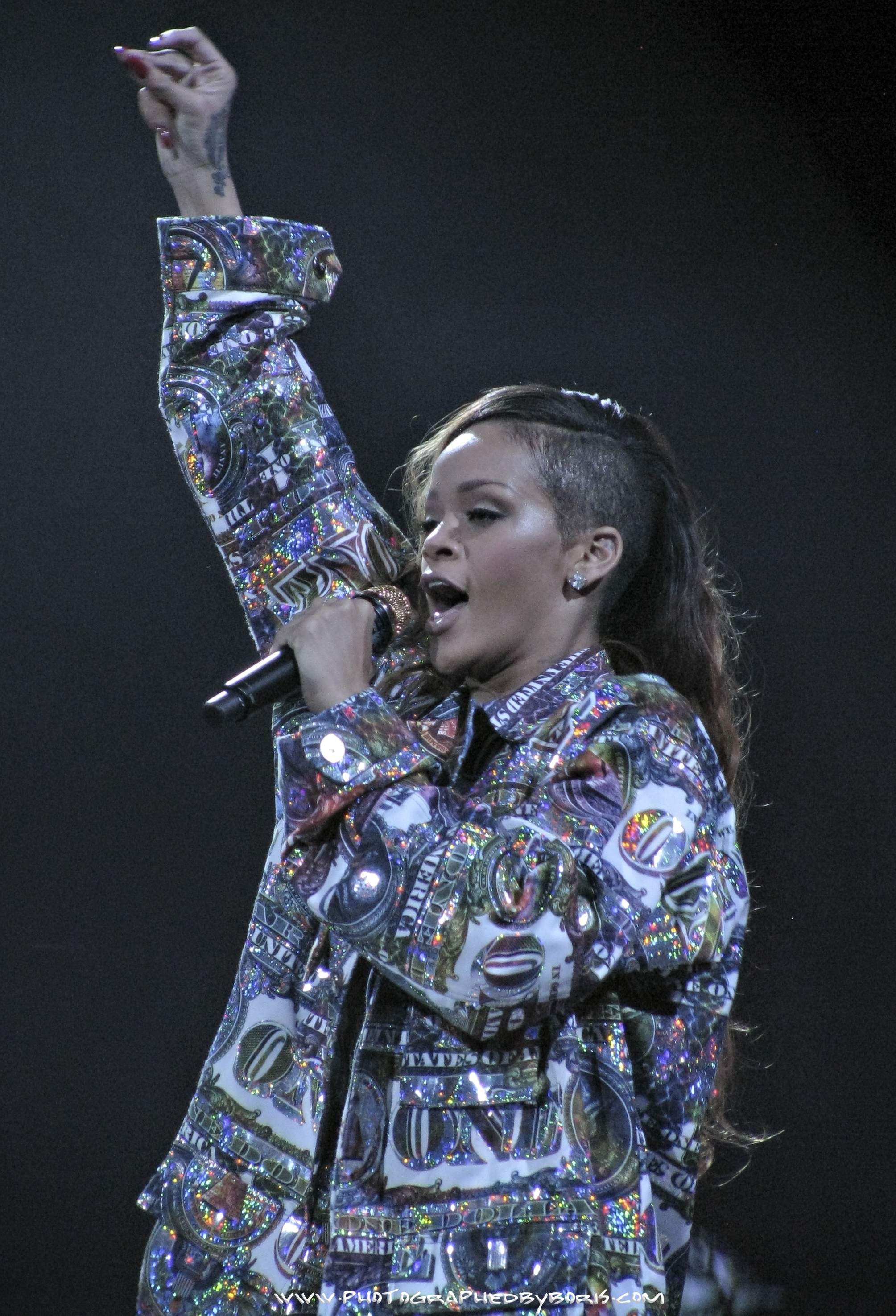
Rihanna performing in March in Toronto

The Diamonds World Tour includes five acts and an encore. The show opens with Rihanna singing "Mother Mary" while kneeling in front of a female monument in a "prayer-like" pose. The bright lights and rich stage production start after the song, when the singer performs "Phresh Out the Runway". The show continues with a rendition of the remix of "Birthday Cake"; a performance through which Rihanna performs several sexually charged movements. For the performance of "Talk That Talk", Rihanna is joined with additional dancers and musicians. After the performances of "Pour It Up" and "Cockiness (Love It)", the singer finishes the set with a rendition of "Numb".

The second set of the Diamonds World Tour is Caribbean inspired and begins with a guitar solo performed by Nuno Bettencourt. After the solo Rihanna appears on the stage with a changed costume and performs "You da One" and "No Love Allowed". For the performance of "Man Down", a mug shot of Rihanna together with her birth name "Robyn Rihanna Fenty" appearing on the video screen. The set is followed up with a performance of her 2009 single "Rude Boy" and ends with Rihanna singing "What's My Name?". The third set of the show, features Rihanna wearing multi-colored leather pants. The set is opened with a performance of "Jump" which features dubstep bass line and pyrotechnics. After that she performs "Umbrella", "All of the Lights", "Rockstar 101" and finishes the set with the ballad "What Now" which features fire and crowd involvement in the performance.

The fourth set features Rihanna wearing a long red dress. During the set she performs a range of ballads; it starts with a performance of "Loveeeeeee Song" (Future's vocals are played in the background) and then continues with "Love the Way You Lie (Part II)". Rihanna performs a shortened version of "Take a Bow", "Cold Case Love" and finishes the set with a rendition of "Hate That I Love You". The fifth act, during which the singer wore an outfit made of money started with a performance of "We Found Love". Rihanna performs a shortened version of "S&M" while having fun in the audience, followed up by "Only Girl (In the World)" and "Don't Stop the Music". The set is finished with a performance of her 2012 single "Where Have You Been". For the encore, Rihanna gets back on the stage as she sings "a strong version" of "Stay" and finishes the concert with "Diamonds".

== Commercial performance ==
After the North American leg of the tour was announced, due to high demand extra dates were added in Brooklyn, Toronto and Montreal. After Rihanna announced the UK leg of the tour, pre-sale tickets searches rose by 700% on viagogo. Experts predicted that tickets for all of Rihanna's European shows could sell out in under six minutes.

Rihanna made history on May 24 at the kickoff of Morocco's annual Mawazine Music Festival by performing for a crowd of 150,000; a new record in the country's capital. Rihanna also made history by becoming the youngest artist to ever headline a show at Paris' Stade de France, at the age of 25, stealing the distinction from Lady Gaga who performed at the stadium the year before at the age of 26. Rihanna also performed at Millennium Stadium and two times at the Twickenham Stadium on June 10, 2013 and June 15 & 16, 2013 and again became the youngest artist ever to sell out the stadiums. Istanbul's İnönü Stadium hosted Rihanna on May 30, 2013. The stadium welcomed 35,000 people for the concert, which lasted an hour and a half.

Rihanna performed to a crowd of 65,000 in Singapore during Singapore Grand Prix on Sunday September 22, 2013. It was one of the biggest concert crowds in recent history. Also, Rihanna's shows in South Africa were a commercial success. Rihanna made history on Sunday night when she became the youngest ever singer to sell out the FNB Stadium in Johannesburg. Rihanna was named the fifth-highest touring artist of 2013 by Billboard magazine, earning a gross of $137,982,530 over the course of 87 shows, of which 84 were sold out. On Pollstar's year-end chart of the top one hundred grossing worldwide tours, from January 1 to December 31, 2013, the Diamonds World Tour was placed at number six with a gross of $141.9 million from the shows that were played during the given time period. Tickets were sold with an average gross of $1,867,248 per city.

== Critical reception ==
=== North America ===
The tour received general acclaim during the North American legs. Mick Stingley of Billboard magazine reviewed Rihanna's performance in Hartford; according to him, the singer shined during the show. He wrote that "her interplay with her dancers and her longtime band leader Nuno Bettencourt, was a treat". Stingley concluded that with the costume and set changes, the video interludes and flashing lights, Rihanna put a "fantastic" show and was in "excellent" voice. Donnie Moorhouse of The Republican also reviewed the show and wrote that it was type of show you would expect from a Grammy star who is in a same stratosphere as singers like Alicia Keys, Beyoncé and Jennifer Lopez. "Rihanna's performance was certainly on par with the performances those stars can deliver." In a review of the concert in Chicago, Bob Gendron of Chicago Tribune stated, "Being a diva affords certain privileges. Which is why Rihanna didn't seem the least bit self-indulgent dressing up like an Egyptian princess, stomping in thigh-high boots and prancing around in the equivalent of expensive lingerie." He noted the heavy background vocals during the performance and wrote that Rihanna sang less in comparison with her previous tours, however moved more, "Her body became a blur of curves and angles—elbows, hands, legs and knees bent into various positions. Suggestive and erotic, she knows how to tease. Reviewing the concert in Detroit and writing for Detroit Free Press, Brian McCollum noted that the Diamonds World Tour is Rihanna's bid for showing 'Serious Artistic Growth. He stated that the performance, "was teeming with artsy flourishes and visual metaphor — from the Venus de Milo image behind her at show's start to the horror-film clips of 'Rockstar 101' to the stately pillars of light accompanying 'Man Down'."

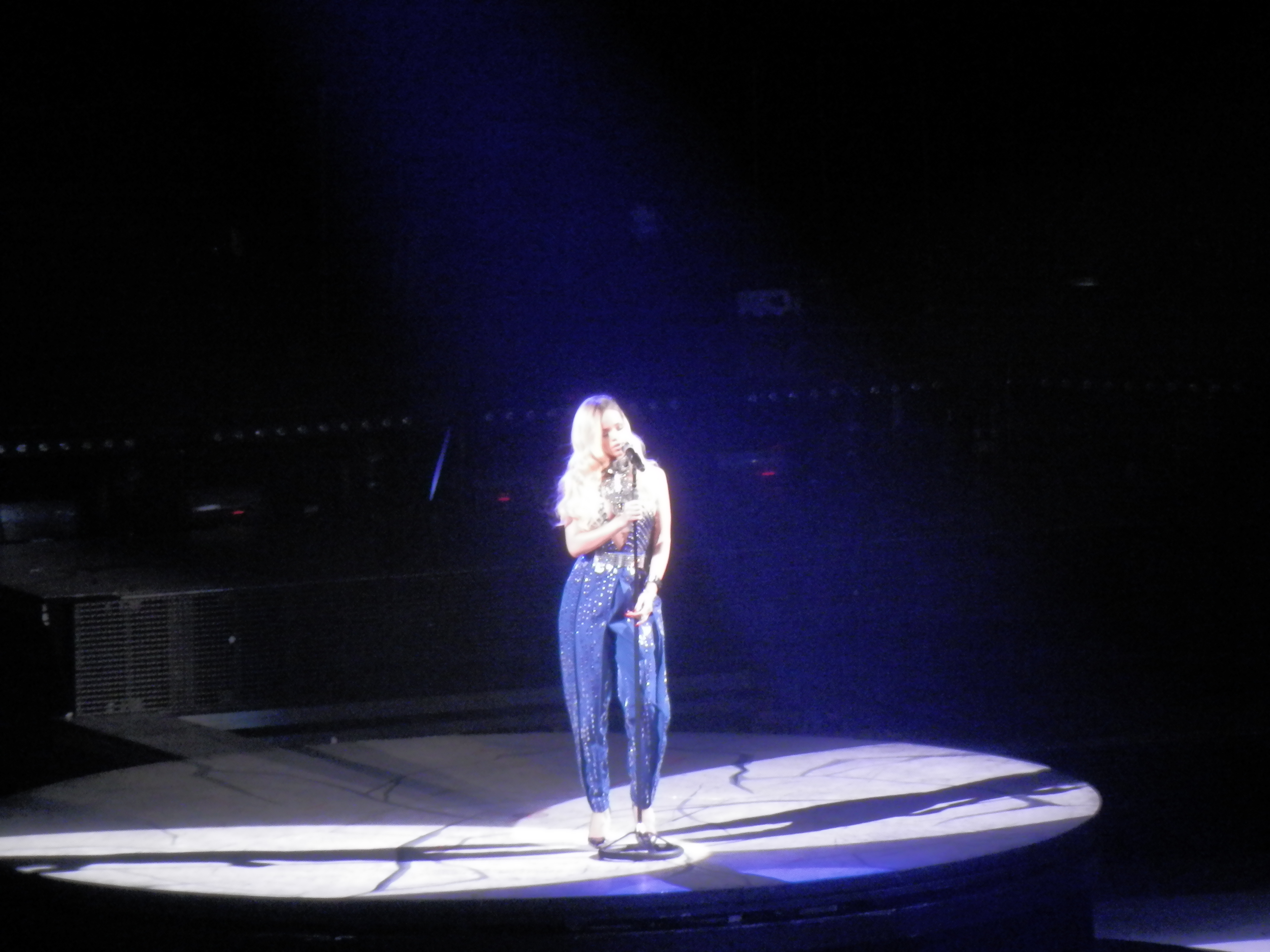
Rihanna performing "Stay" during the show in Lisbon, Portugal. The performance of the song together with other ballads was praised by critics.

The Globe and Mail's Brad Wheeler in a review of one of the Toronto shows wrote, "Rihanna's star is hot and still on the rise – Beyoncé's Sasha Fierce is now Sasha Fears." Natasha Paolini of HipHopCanada stated, "Since the last time I saw Rihanna live in concert, it was obvious that she has grown and matured as an artist and as an individual. I love the way she performed on this tour, she was sexy, charming and even vulnerable at times. With the exception of minor vocal slip-ups, Rihanna put on a stellar show that was tasteful, raw and fun." Mikael Wood of Los Angeles Times wrote, that "the singer inhabited each of her characters with total conviction, portraying a lifelike complexity often lost on A-list pop peers such as Katy Perry and Beyoncé." Wood praised the performance particular the rendition of "Stay" stating that the halter-top pantsuit she wore accompanied with the minimal arrangement of the song remind him of Diana Ross in her middle career. Rick Florino of Artistdirect also praised the show in Los Angeles and wrote, "In fact, she's one of the last real rockstars left, and she's owning the title like a true champ. Every tour Rihanna launches, she still manages to step up her game and best the last one. Of course, that's tradition for any rockstar worth his or her salt, but she's keeping live music exciting with mind-blowing production and tight performances."

Brenna Rushing of The Dallas Morning News similarly as other reviewers wrote, "Rihanna took full control of the surprisingly simple stage, dripping in sex appeal and belting knockout notes." She further stated that, "Rihanna treated the audience to rump-shaking sways and dance moves only a few pop stars can manage. But make no mistake, this sensual style wasn't a mask for her performance; it was just an enhancement." Rushing noted that if the fast club songs didn't catch the audience, then the ballad must did and praised their rendition. In a review of the Houston show, Joey Guerra of The Houston Chronicle stated "Rihanna sometimes emits a cold energy in videos and on record. But she comes alive onstage. There was energy and intent in every vocal lick, every hip swivel, every kick in thigh-high white boots. And that was before she even got to the big hits." Notably, Guerra praised the performances of "What Now" and the ballad set noting that nothing felt over choreographed as one moment led to another. Despite all the positive reviews during the North American leg, James Reed of Boston.com criticized Rihanna's tardiness to the Boston and the overtly use of backing tracks. However, he concluded with other critics that the ballads were her strongest moments of the night.

=== Europe and Oceania ===
Hannah Britt of British Daily Express reviewed Rihanna's concert at Twickenham Stadium in London stating, "Her vocals during the beautiful 'Stay' were bang on and, as a performer, she is simply captivating to watch. Whether thrusting her crotch towards the crowd, or simply standing smiling down at them, when Rihanna is in front of you, you can't take your eyes off her. Whether you agree with her morals or not, one cannot deny that the woman knows how to own a stage." Robert Copsey of Digital Spy gave the concert three out of five stars and concluded that although the concert was a "nonetheless a well-honed show that had its moments" including a 70,000 crowd singing "We Found Love" and "Only Girl (In the World)", it lacked shocking moments and spontaneity that "let her down". Manchester Evening News's gave the first show in Manchester Arena four out of five stars and wrote, "Not only is Rihanna a rockstar, and a showbiz veteran at the tender age of 25, but a legend in her own right." In a review of the show in Cardiff, Wales, Elena Cresci of Western Mail wrote that Rihanna commands the performance as well as her multi-platinum selling colleagues and also knows what her fans want and gives it to them.

== Set list ==
This set list is from the show on March 21, 2013 in Detroit. It does not represent all concerts for the tour.

1. "Mother Mary"
2. "Phresh Out the Runway"
3. "Birthday Cake"
4. "Talk That Talk"
5. "Pour It Up"
6. "Cockiness (Love It)"
7. "Numb"
8. "You da One"
9. "Man Down"
10. "No Love Allowed"
11. "Rude Boy"
12. "What's My Name?"
13. "Jump"
14. "Umbrella"
15. "All of the Lights" / "Rockstar 101"
16. "What Now"
17. "Loveeeeeee Song"
18. "Love the Way You Lie (Part II)" / "Take a Bow" / "Cold Case Love"
19. "Hate That I Love You"
20. "We Found Love"
21. "S&M" / "Only Girl (In the World)" / "Don't Stop the Music"
22. "Where Have You Been"

Encore

23. "Stay"
24. "Diamonds"

Notes

- During stadium and festival shows, Rihanna opened the show with "Phresh Out the Runway".

== Shows ==
List of 2013 concerts, showing date, city, country, venue, opening act, tickets sold, number of available tickets and amount of gross revenue
Date	City	Country	Venue	Opening act	Attendance	Revenue
March 8, 2013	Buffalo	United States	First Niagara Center	ASAP Rocky	15,614 / 15,614	$1,117,147
March 14, 2013	Philadelphia	United States	Wells Fargo Center	ASAP Rocky	15,095 / 15,095	$1,080,298
March 15, 2013	Hartford	United States	XL Center	ASAP Rocky	10,985 / 10,985	$842,941
March 17, 2013	Montreal	Canada	Bell Centre	ASAP Rocky	16,054 / 16,054	$1,278,497
March 18, 2013	Toronto	Canada	Air Canada Centre	ASAP Rocky	32,038 / 32,038	$2,498,532
March 19, 2013	Toronto	Canada	Air Canada Centre	ASAP Rocky	32,038 / 32,038	$2,498,532
March 21, 2013	Detroit	United States	Joe Louis Arena	ASAP Rocky	15,349 / 15,349	$937,674
March 22, 2013	Chicago	United States	United Center	ASAP Rocky	15,902 / 15,902	$1,234,380
March 24, 2013	Saint Paul	United States	Xcel Energy Center	ASAP Rocky	10,929 / 10,929	$780,143
March 25, 2013	Winnipeg	Canada	MTS Centre	ASAP Rocky	10,649 / 10,649	$880,893
March 27, 2013	Edmonton	Canada	Rexall Place	ASAP Rocky	13,133 / 13,133	$1,008,532
March 30, 2013	Calgary	Canada	Scotiabank Saddledome	ASAP Rocky	13,495 / 13,495	$1,012,286
April 1, 2013	Vancouver	Canada	Rogers Arena	ASAP Rocky	14,879 / 14,879	$1,153,688
April 3, 2013	Seattle	United States	KeyArena	ASAP Rocky	10,906 / 10,906	$782,027
April 6, 2013	San Jose	United States	HP Pavilion	ASAP Rocky	14,027 / 14,027	$1,047,778
April 8, 2013	Los Angeles	United States	Staples Center	ASAP Rocky	14,882 / 14,882	$1,297,755
April 9, 2013	Anaheim	United States	Honda Center	ASAP Rocky	11,050 / 11,050	$950,442
April 11, 2013	San Diego	United States	Valley View Casino Center	ASAP Rocky	11,831 / 11,831	$899,782
April 12, 2013	Las Vegas	United States	Mandalay Bay Events Center	ASAP Rocky	8,861 / 8,861	$1,047,675
April 19, 2013	Tampa	United States	Tampa Bay Times Forum	ASAP Rocky	11,705 / 11,705	$901,024
April 20, 2013	Sunrise	United States	BB&T Center	ASAP Rocky	13,959 / 13,959	$1,042,363
April 22, 2013	Atlanta	United States	Philips Arena	ASAP Rocky	13,233 / 13,233	$924,581
April 24, 2013 (Note: The April 24, 2013 concert at the 1st Mariner Arena in Baltimore was originally scheduled to take place on March 12, but was postponed due to Rihanna having laryngitis.)	Baltimore	United States	1st Mariner Arena	ASAP Rocky	11,002 / 11,002	$788,340
April 26, 2013	Atlantic City	United States	Revel Ovation Hall	ASAP Rocky	4,391 / 4,391	$515,641
April 28, 2013	Newark	United States	Prudential Center	ASAP Rocky	13,999 / 13,999	$1,215,879
April 29, 2013	Washington, D.C.	United States	Verizon Center	ASAP Rocky	14,339 / 14,339	$1,185,020
May 1, 2013	Montreal	Canada	Bell Centre	ASAP Rocky	14,028 / 14,028	$1,190,028
May 2, 2013	Ottawa	Canada	Scotiabank Place	ASAP Rocky	11,990 / 11,990	$852,724
May 5, 2013	New York City	United States	Barclays Center	ASAP Rocky	29,072 / 29,072	$2,465,993
May 6, 2013 (Note: The May 6, 2013 concert at the TD Garden in Boston was originally scheduled to take place on March 10, but was postponed due to Rihanna having laryngitis.)	Boston	United States	TD Garden	ASAP Rocky	14,083 / 14,083	$1,061,548
May 7, 2013 (Note: The May 7, 2013 concert at the Barclays Center in New York City was originally scheduled to take place on May 4, but was postponed due to 2013 NBA Playoffs.)	New York City	United States	Barclays Center	ASAP Rocky	(Note: The score data is combined from the two shows held at the Barclays Center on May 5 and May 7 respectively.)	
May 24, 2013 (Note: The May 24, 2013 concert at the OLM Souissi in Rabat, Morocco is part of the Mawazine festival.)	Rabat	Morocco	OLM Souissi	—N/a	—N/a	—N/a
May 26, 2013	Bilbao	Spain	Bizkaia Arena	GTA	13,770 / 13,770	$995,676
May 28, 2013	Lisbon	Portugal	MEO Arena	GTA	18,006 / 18,006	$1,151,120
May 30, 2013	Istanbul	Turkey	İnönü Stadium	GTA	33,483 / 33,483	$3,547,707
June 1, 2013	Barcelona	Spain	Palau Sant Jordi	GTA	17,761 / 17,761	$1,339,319
June 2, 2013	Montpellier	France	Park&Suites Arena	GTA	12,627 / 12,627	$915,172
June 3, 2013	Lyon	France	Halle Tony Garnier	GTA; HAIM	15,339 / 15,339	$994,578
June 5, 2013	Antwerp	Belgium	Sportpaleis	GTA; HAIM	39,436 / 39,436	$2,881,499
June 6, 2013	Antwerp	Belgium	Sportpaleis	GTA; HAIM	39,436 / 39,436	$2,881,499
June 8, 2013	Saint-Denis	France	Stade de France	David Guetta; GTA	75,841 / 75,841	$6,488,029
June 10, 2013	Cardiff	Wales	Millennium Stadium	David Guetta; GTA	60,307 / 60,307	$4,647,267
June 12, 2013	Manchester	England	Manchester Arena	GTA	55,687 / 55,687	$4,677,878
June 13, 2013	Manchester	England	Manchester Arena	GTA	55,687 / 55,687	$4,677,878
June 15, 2013	London	England	Twickenham Stadium	David Guetta; GTA	95,971 / 95,971	$8,656,858
June 16, 2013	London	England	Twickenham Stadium	David Guetta; GTA	95,971 / 95,971	$8,656,858
June 17, 2013	Birmingham	England	LG Arena	GTA	28,160 / 28,160	$2,446,331
June 20, 2013	Sunderland	England	Stadium of Light	David Guetta; GTA	54,259 / 54,259	$4,413,716
June 21, 2013	Dublin	Ireland	Aviva Stadium	GTA	48,482 / 48,482	$4,956,284
June 23, 2013	Amsterdam	Netherlands	Ziggo Dome	GTA	33,369 / 33,369	$2,354,542
June 24, 2013	Amsterdam	Netherlands	Ziggo Dome	GTA	33,369 / 33,369	$2,354,542
June 26, 2013	Cologne	Germany	Lanxess Arena	GTA	31,507 / 31,507	$2,560,136
June 27, 2013	Cologne	Germany	Lanxess Arena	GTA	31,507 / 31,507	$2,560,136
June 29, 2013	Zürich	Switzerland	Hallenstadion	GTA	27,122 / 27,122	$2,380,749
June 30, 2013	Zürich	Switzerland	Hallenstadion	GTA	27,122 / 27,122	$2,380,749
July 2, 2013	Berlin	Germany	O_{2} World	GTA	13,649 / 13,649	$1,079,422
July 3, 2013	Hanover	Germany	TUI Arena	GTA	10,888 / 10,888	$917,312
July 5, 2013 (Note: The July 5, 2013 concert in Roskilde, Denmark is a part of the Roskilde Festival.)	Roskilde	Denmark	Roskilde Festival	—N/a	—N/a	—N/a
July 7, 2013 (Note: The July 7, 2013 concert in Gdynia, Poland is a part of the Heineken Open'er Festival. The concert is a "bonus gig".)	Gdynia	Poland	Babie Doły Airport	Dizzee Rascal	—N/a	—N/a
July 9, 2013	Vienna	Austria	Wiener Stadthalle	GTA; HAIM	15,990 / 15,990	$1,306,615
July 10, 2013 (Note: The July 10, and July 11, 2013 concerts in Monte Carlo, Monaco are part of the Monte-Carlo Sporting Summer Festival.)	Monte Carlo	Monaco	Salle des Étoiles	—N/a	—N/a	—N/a
July 11, 2013	Monte Carlo	Monaco	Salle des Étoiles	—N/a	—N/a	—N/a
July 13, 2013 (Note: The July 13, 2013 concert in Perth and Kinross, Scotland is a part of the T in the Park Festival.)	Perth and Kinross	Scotland	Balado	—N/a	—N/a	—N/a
July 15, 2013	Manchester	England	Manchester Arena	GTA	(Note: The score data is combined from the four shows held at the Manchester Arena on June 12 and 13 and July 15 and 16.)	
July 16, 2013	Manchester	England	Manchester Arena	GTA	(Note: The score data is combined from the four shows held at the Manchester Arena on June 12 and 13 and July 15 and 16.)	
July 18, 2013	Birmingham	England	LG Arena	GTA	(Note: The score data is combined from the two shows held at the LG Arena on June 17 and July 18)	
July 20, 2013	Lille	France	Stade Pierre-Mauroy	—N/a	27,294 / 27,294	$2,188,620
July 22, 2013	Stockholm	Sweden	Ericsson Globe	GTA	13,929 / 13,929	$1,226,039
July 25, 2013	Oslo	Norway	Telenor Arena	GTA	17,832 / 17,832	$2,250,403
July 26, 2013	Bergen	Norway	Koengen	GTA	20,125 / 20,125	$2,516,799
July 28, 2013 (Note: The July 28, 2013 concert at the Hartwall Arena in Helsinki, Finland was originally scheduled to take place on July 20.)	Helsinki	Finland	Hartwall Arena	GTA	12,111 / 12,111	$1,198,861
September 13, 2013	Cotai	Macau	Cotai Arena	GTA	24,872 / 24,872	$2,909,479
September 14, 2013	Cotai	Macau	Cotai Arena	GTA	24,872 / 24,872	$2,909,479
September 19, 2013	Pasay	Philippines	Mall of Asia Arena	GTA	8,118 / 9,743	$810,543
September 22, 2013 (Note: The September 22, 2013 concert at the Marina Bay Street Circuit in Singapore is part of the 2013 Singapore Grand Prix.)	Singapore		Padang	GTA	—N/a	—N/a
September 24, 2013	Perth	Australia	Perth Arena	GTA	13,222 / 13,222	$1,535,953
September 26, 2013	Adelaide	Australia	Adelaide Entertainment Centre	GTA	9,281 / 9,281	$1,037,041
September 28, 2013	Brisbane	Australia	Brisbane Entertainment Centre	GTA	12,116 / 12,116	$1,341,098
September 30, 2013	Melbourne	Australia	Rod Laver Arena	GTA	24,017 / 24,017	$2,749,982
October 1, 2013	Melbourne	Australia	Rod Laver Arena	GTA	24,017 / 24,017	$2,749,982
October 3, 2013	Sydney	Australia	Allphones Arena	GTA	30,361 / 30,361	$3,449,021
October 4, 2013	Sydney	Australia	Allphones Arena	GTA	30,361 / 30,361	$3,449,021
October 6, 2013	Auckland	New Zealand	Vector Arena	GTA	33,565 / 33,565	$3,377,624
October 7, 2013	Auckland	New Zealand	Vector Arena	GTA	33,565 / 33,565	$3,377,624
October 8, 2013	Auckland	New Zealand	Vector Arena	GTA	33,565 / 33,565	$3,377,624
October 13, 2013	Johannesburg	South Africa	FNB Stadium	GTA	67,291 / 67,291	$3,732,307
October 16, 2013	Cape Town	South Africa	Cape Town Stadium	GTA	39,616 / 39,616	$1,872,570
October 19, 2013	Abu Dhabi	United Arab Emirates	du Arena	GTA	23,757 / 24,470	$3,717,513
October 22, 2013	Tel Aviv	Israel	Yarkon Park	GTA	50,554 / 50,554	$6,121,631
October 26, 2013	Punta Cana	Dominican Republic	Hard Rock Hotel & Casino	ASAP Rocky	13,974 / 17,326	$1,695,810
October 29, 2013	San Juan	Puerto Rico	Hiram Bithorn Stadium	ASAP Rocky	16,074 / 16,074	$1,569,910
November 9, 2013	Denver	United States	Pepsi Center	2 Chainz	10,180 / 10,180	$710,749
November 11, 2013 (Note: The November 11, 2013 concert at the American Airlines Center in Dallas was originally scheduled to take place on April 16, but was postponed due to sickness.)	Dallas	United States	American Airlines Center	2 Chainz	11,182 / 11,182	$765,281
November 12, 2013	Oklahoma City	United States	Chesapeake Energy Arena	2 Chainz	6,556 / 6,556	$501,475
November 14, 2013 (Note: The November 14, 2013 concert at the Toyota Center in Houston was originally scheduled to take place on April 15, but was postponed due to sickness.)	Houston	United States	Toyota Center	ASAP Rocky	12,610 / 12,610	$1,013,001
November 15, 2013	New Orleans	United States	New Orleans Arena	ASAP Rocky	10,974 / 10,974	$865,010
Total					1,618,745 / 1,624,435 (99.6%)	$138,860,541

== Cancelled shows ==
List of concerts, showing date, city, country, venue and reason for cancellation
Date	City	Country	Venue	Reason
November 1, 2013	Bridgetown	Barbados	Kensington Oval	Technical problems

== Personnel ==
=== Main ===
- Management – RocNation
- Tour Manager – Jason Milner
- Assistant Tour Managers – Jason Geisinger
- Production Coordinator – Tracy Metz
- Production Manager – Joe Sanchez
- Videographer – Evan Rodgers
- Personal Assistant – Jennifer Rosales
- Stage Manager – Roger Cabot
- Automation Techs- Brian Benauer, Trevit Cromwell, Yader Mena, Seth Posner, Mike Burgess, Tom Armstong
- Automation Operator- Collin Nevins, Nicholas Purciful
- Creative Direction – Willow Perron
- Stage Production – Antony Randall
- Design Director – Adam Selman
- Design Team – Marley Glassrot, Greg Kozatek, Laren Leblanc, Briana Magnifico, and Zev Schwartz
- Stylists – Mel Ottenberg and Yusef Williams
- GTA Tour Manager – Joseph Lyes

- Director of Choreography – HIHAT
- Choreographer – Troy Kirby
- Assistant Choreographers – Calvit Hodge and April Thomas
- Musical Director – Omar Edwards
- Musical Director – Adam Blackstone
- Tour Promoter – Live Nation Global Touring

=== Band ===
- Rihanna – Lead vocals
- Nuno Bettencourt – Guitar / Band Leader
- Chris Johnson (drummer) – Drums
- Nicole Kehl – Backing vocals
- Pete Kuzma – Keyboards
- Ashley Simpson – Backing vocals
- Eric Smith – Bass
- Devine Evans;– Electronic Musician / Protools Operator / Sound Design / Digital Effects

Credits and personnel adapted from official tour book.
