= Right Now (Rihanna song) =

Single by Rihanna featuring David Guetta

from the album Unapologetic
- B-side: "Pour It Up" (remix)
- Released: May 28, 2013
- Recorded: 2012
- Studio: Metropolis Studios (London, UK); R Studios (Los Angeles, California)
- Genre: EDM
- Length: 3:01
- Label: Def Jam; SRP
- Songwriters: David Guetta; Giorgio Tuinfort; Mikkel S. Eriksen; Nick Rotteveel; Shaffer Smith; Terius Nash; Tor Erik Hermansen; Robyn Fenty
- Producers: David Guetta; Nicky Romero; Stargate; Giorgio Tuinfort; Kuk Harrell

Rihanna singles chronology
"Pour It Up" (2013)	"Right Now" (2013)	"Bad" (remix) (2013)

David Guetta singles chronology
"Play Hard" (2013)	"Right Now" (2013)	"Ain't a Party" (2013)

"Right Now" is a song recorded by the Barbadian singer Rihanna featuring French DJ and producer David Guetta. It was released as part of Rihanna's seventh album, Unapologetic (2012). Guetta co-wrote the song with R&B singers Ne-Yo and The-Dream, while their longtime collaborators, Norwegian production duo Stargate, co-produced the track alongside Guetta and his own longtime collaborators Nicky Romero and Giorgio Tuinfort. It was sent to contemporary hit and rhythmic contemporary radios in the United States as the fourth single from the album on May 28, 2013. Musically, "Right Now" is an EDM and pop song. The lyrical content features Rihanna chanting to live life in the moment.

The song garnered a mostly positive response from music critics. While many of them deemed it one of the highlights of Unapologetic, some were also divided by the song, calling it safe. Upon the release of Unapologetic, "Right Now" charted in many countries worldwide, including the top ten in Israel and the UK Dance Chart. "Right Now" debuted at number 90 on the US Billboard Hot 100, reaching a peak of 50. Furthermore, it has topped the US Hot Dance Club Songs chart becoming Rihanna's twentieth number one on the chart, thus surpassing Janet Jackson's tally. The song performed well in Australia where it was certified Platinum by the Australian Recording Industry Association (ARIA).

No music video was shot for the song, and it received no televised performances as part of promotion. However, the song was used as the promotional musical backdrop for the coverage of the 2013 NBA Playoffs and was used by lager company Budweiser as part of their global "Made for Music" campaign co-starring Jay-Z. The song was also remixed by mash-up artist DJ Earworm.

== Background ==
Rihanna began "working on the new sound" for her seventh studio album in March 2012, even though she had not yet begun recording. On September 12, 2012, Def Jam France announced via Twitter that Rihanna would release a new single the upcoming week while her seventh studio album was scheduled to be released in November 2012. However, the tweet was shortly deleted and replaced with another clarifying that "more information will be made available tomorrow, Thursday, September 13". Via her official Twitter account, Rihanna posted series of "teasing" tweets announcing her seventh studio album.

== Production and composition ==
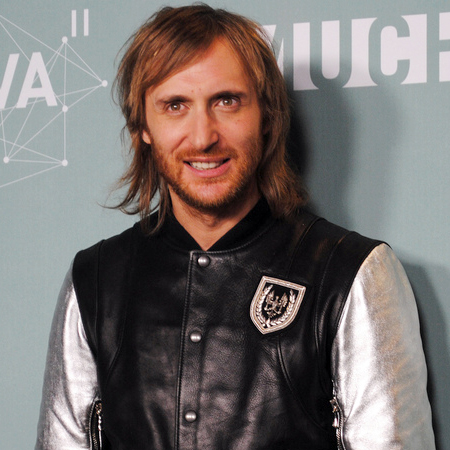
French disk-jockey David Guetta co-wrote and co-produced the song.

During the production process of Unapologetic, Rihanna wrote on her Twitter account that there was a secret collaboration featured on the album, and that the collaborator's birthday is on November 7. She later explicitly revealed the artist to be French disk-jockey David Guetta, announcing that he produced "Right Now" and another song "Phresh Out the Runway" for the album. Rihanna and Guetta previously collaborated on "Who's That Chick?" (2010), which is included in the re-release of his second studio album One Love (2009), titled One More Love (2010).

"Right Now" was written by Rihanna, David Guetta, Ne-Yo, The-Dream, Giorgio Tuinfort, Nicky Romero, and Norwegian production duo Stargate. Production, instrumentation, and programming for the song were handled by Guetta, Romero, Tuinfort, and Stargate. The record engineers were Paul Norris and Aamir Yaqub, who were assisted by Xavier Stephenson at Metropolis Studios in London. Rihanna's vocals were recorded by Marcus Tovar and Kuk Harrell at R Studios in Los Angeles, California, while it was mixed by Manny Marroquin at Larrabee Studios in Burbank, California and Romero at White Villa Studios in Ede, Netherlands. Harrell also handled production of Rihanna's vocals.

"Right Now" is an EDM song, with a duration of 3:01. According to the sheet music published at Musicnotes.com, the song is written in the key of E♭ minor with a moderately fast tempo of 130 beats per minute. "Right Now" follows the chord progression E♭m−C♭−A♭m−B♭m7, and Rihanna's vocals span from A♭_{3} to D♭_{5}.

== Critical reception ==
The song received mostly positive reviews from critics, deeming it as one of the standout tracks on Unapologetic. Smokey Fontaine for The Huffington Post praised the collaboration between Rihanna and Guetta, writing "'Right Now' is a future No. 1 that sounds so obvious because... it's so good." Jon Caramanica for The New York Times positively critiqued the song, as well as the other Guetta produced track "Phresh Out the Runway" on the album, as they are "appealingly guttural" despite sounding harsh. Robert Copsey for Digital Spy labelled it as "safe", and Genevieve Koski for The A.V. Club gave the song a mixed review.

== Commercial performance ==
Upon the release of Unapologetic, "Right Now" charted in several territories due to strong digital downloads. It debuted on the Irish Singles Chart at number 77 on November 22, 2012. The song re-entered the chart on June 6, 2013, at number 78. In the United Kingdom, "Right Now" debuted on the UK Singles Chart at number 36 on November 25. It also subsequently entered the UK Dance Chart at number seven in the same chart issue. In Scotland, the song debuted at number 25 on November 25, 2012, eleven places higher than its UK-wide position. Elsewhere in Europe, the song peaked at number 43 in Germany, number 31 in France and number 32 in Switzerland . "Right Now" also debuted at number 32 on the Canadian Hot 100 chart.

On February 25, 2013, "Right Now" entered the Australian Singles Chart at number 39. The song was later certified platinum in the country for sales of 70,000 copies. On June 10, 2013, "Right Now" entered the US Mainstream Top 40 chart at number 37. The debut scored Rihanna a record-extending thirty-sixth entry, extending her lead as the artist with most appearances on the chart since 1992. On August 8, 2013, "Right Now" reached number one on the US Dance Club Songs chart, marking Rihanna's 20th chart topper of her career. With the feat, Rihanna moved into second place, ahead of Janet Jackson who has 19 leaders, among artists with the most number ones in the chart's 37-year history. Rihanna trails only Madonna, with 43 number ones.

== Usage in media ==
From April 2013, Turner Sports began using "Right Now" as the promotional musical backdrop for its coverage of the 2013 NBA Playoffs. On July 2, 2013, mash-up artist DJ Earworm released a summer mix incorporating "Right Now" with other tracks released around the same period. Also in the same month, lager production company Budweiser announced that Rihanna had become a part of their global "Made For Music" campaign, also co-starring Jay-Z. A commercial video was released featuring the singer and "Right Now".

== Track listing ==
CD (2-track)
No.	Title	Writer(s)	Producer(s)	Length
1.	"Right Now" (featuring David Guetta)	Ester Dean; Nash; Fenty; Guetta; Eriksen; Hermansen; Shaffer Smith; Tuinfort; Nick Rotteveel	Guetta; Stargate; Nicky Romero; Tuinfort	3:01
2.	"Pour It Up" (remix; featuring Young Jeezy, Rick Ross, Juicy J and T.I.)	Jay Jenkins; Robyn Fenty; Williams Roberts; Jordan Houston; Clifford Harris; Michael Williams; Theron Thomas; Timothy Thomas	Mike Will Made It; J-Bo	5:08
Total length:				8:09

Digital download (remixes)
No.	Title	Version	Length
1.	"Right Now" (featuring David Guetta)	Dyro radio edit	3:04
2.	"Right Now" (featuring David Guetta)	Dyro club mix	4:04
3.	"Right Now" (featuring David Guetta)	Dyro instrumental	4:04
4.	"Right Now" (featuring David Guetta)	Sick Individuals radio edit	3:16
5.	"Right Now" (featuring David Guetta)	Sick Individuals club mix	5:31
6.	"Right Now" (featuring David Guetta)	Sick Individuals dub	5:16
7.	"Right Now" (featuring David Guetta)	Sick Individuals instrumental	5:31
8.	"Right Now" (featuring David Guetta)	Justin Prime radio edit	4:00
9.	"Right Now" (featuring David Guetta)	Justin Prime vocal mix	4:59
10.	"Right Now" (featuring David Guetta)	Justin Prime instrumental	4:59
11.	"Right Now" (featuring David Guetta)	Ralphi Rosario radio edit	3:47
12.	"Right Now" (featuring David Guetta)	Ralphi Rosario club mix	7:41
13.	"Right Now" (featuring David Guetta)	Ralphi Rosario tough mix	7:27
14.	"Right Now" (featuring David Guetta)	Ralphi Rosario dub	7:32
Total length:			1:11:11

== Credits and personnel ==
Recording

- Recorded at Metropolis Studios, London, UK; R Studios, Los Angeles, California.
- Mixed at White Villa Studios, Ede, Netherlands; Larrabbee Studios, Burbank, California.

Personnel

- Lead vocals – Rihanna
- Featured artist – David Guetta
- Songwriting – Terius Nash, Robyn Fenty, David Guetta, Mikkel S. Eriksen, Tor Erik Hermansen, Shaffer Smith, Giorgio Tuinfort, Nick Rotteveel
- Production – David Guetta, Stargate, Nicky Romero, Giorgio Tuinfort
- Recording engineers – Paul Norris, Aamir Yaqub
- Assistant vocal engineer – Xavier Stephenson
- Vocal production – Kuk Harrell
- Vocal recording – Kuk Harrell, Marcos Tovar
- Mixing – Nicky Romero, Manny Marroquin
- All instruments and programming – David Guetta, Stargate, Nicky Romero, Giorgio Tuinfort

Credits adapted from the liner notes of Unapologetic, Def Jam Recordings, SRP Records.

== Charts ==
=== Weekly charts ===
Weekly chart performance
Chart (2012–2013)	Peak position
Australia (ARIA)	39
Austria (Ö3 Austria Top 40)	25
Belgium (Ultratop 50 Flanders)	34
Belgium (Ultratop Flanders Dance)	17
Belgium (Ultratop 50 Wallonia)	37
Belgium (Ultratop Wallonia Dance)	3
Canada Hot 100 (Billboard)	32
Denmark (Tracklisten)	36
Finland Download (Suomen virallinen latauslista)	24
France (SNEP)	31
Germany (GfK)	43
Ireland (IRMA)	52
Israel International Airplay (Media Forest)	3
Japan Hot 100 (Billboard)	25
Netherlands (Dutch Top 40)	28
Netherlands (Single Top 100)	54
Scottish Singles Sales (Official Charts)	25
Poland Dance (ZPAV)	23
Slovakia Airplay (ČNS IFPI)	59
South Korea (Circle) Dyro radio edit	155
South Korea Foreign (Circle) original	3
Sweden (Sverigetopplistan)	25
Switzerland (Schweizer Hitparade)	32
UK Singles (Official Charts)	36
UK Dance (Official Charts)	7
US Billboard Hot 100	50
US Dance Club Songs (Billboard)	1
US Hot Dance/Electronic Songs (Billboard)	5
US Pop Airplay (Billboard)	15
US Rhythmic Airplay (Billboard)	13

=== Year-end charts ===
Year-end chart performance
Chart (2013)	Position
Australia Dance (ARIA)	49
Belgium Dance (Ultratop Flanders)	63
Belgium Dance (Ultratop Wallonia)	12
France (SNEP)	124
Netherlands (Dutch Top 40)	137
South Korea Foreign (Circle) Dyro radio edit	172
US Dance Club Songs (Billboard)	20
US Hot Dance/Electronic Songs (Billboard)	18

== Certifications ==
Certifications
Region	Certification	Certified units/sales
Australia (ARIA)	Platinum	70,000^{^}
Brazil (Pro-Música Brasil)	Platinum	60,000^{‡}
New Zealand (RMNZ)	Gold	15,000^{‡}
Sweden (GLF)	Platinum	40,000^{‡}
United Kingdom (BPI)	Silver	200,000^{‡}
United States (RIAA)	Gold	500,000^{‡}
^{^} Shipments figures based on certification alone.^{‡} Sales+streaming figures based on certification alone.

== Release history ==
Release history
Region	Date	Format(s)	Version	Label	Ref.
United States	May 28, 2013	Contemporary hit radio; rhythmic contemporary radio	Original	Def Jam	
Germany	June 21, 2013	CD	2-track	Universal	
United States	July 2, 2013	Digital download	Remixes	Def Jam	
United Kingdom	July 16, 2013	Digital download	Remixes	Virgin EMI	
United States	July 22, 2013	Adult contemporary radio; hot adult contemporary radio; modern adult contemporary radio	Original	Def Jam	

== See also ==
- List of Billboard Dance Club Songs number ones of 2013
