= Pour It Up =

2013 single by Rihanna

Single by Rihanna

from the album Unapologetic
- Released: January 8, 2013
- Recorded: 2012
- Studio: Westlake Recording Studios (Hollywood, CA)
- Genre: Club; trap; R&B
- Length: 2:48
- Label: Def Jam; Roc Nation; SRP
- Songwriters: Michael "Mike Will Made It" Williams; Theron Thomas; Timothy Thomas; Justin Garner; Robyn Rihanna Fenty
- Producers: Mike Will Made It; JBo

Rihanna singles chronology
"Stay" (2012)	"Pour It Up" (2013)	"Right Now" (2013)

Music video
- "Pour It Up" on YouTube

Remix single cover
- Remix featuring Young Jeezy, Rick Ross, Juicy J, and T.I. cover

Young Jeezy singles chronology
"R.I.P." (2013)	"Pour It Up" (remix) (2013)	"Act Right" (2013)

Rick Ross singles chronology
"U.O.E.N.O." (2013)	"Pour It Up" (remix) (2013)	"No New Friends" (2013)

Juicy J singles chronology
"One of Those Nights" (2013)	"Pour It Up" (remix) (2013)	"Crazy Kids" (2013)

T.I. singles chronology
"Blurred Lines" (2013)	"Pour It Up" (remix) (2013)	"Memories Back Then" (2013)

"Pour It Up" is a song by the Barbadian singer Rihanna from her seventh album, Unapologetic (2012). It was serviced to urban radio stations in the United States on January 8, 2013, as the second US single, and third overall single from the album. It was later also sent to contemporary hit radio radios in the country. Written by Rock City with Rihanna and producers Mike Will Made It and JBo, it is a club, trap, and R&B song with a minimal hip-hop beat. Rihanna brags about her wealth on the song which serves as both a strip club anthem and a declaration of independence.

"Pour It Up" received a mixed response from critics, some of whom cited it as a highlight on Unapologetic, whilst others felt it was out of place. Upon its release as a single in the US, "Pour It Up" debuted at number 90 on the Billboard Hot 100 chart, on which it ultimately peaked at number 19. It also became Rihanna's second number one single on the Hot R&B/Hip-Hop Airplay chart and reached number six on the Hot R&B/Hip-Hop Songs chart.

Rihanna performed the song on her fifth and sixth headlining tour, the Diamonds World Tour and Anti World Tour. The song's official remix was released on March 20, 2013, and features additional rap verses from Young Jeezy, T.I., Rick Ross and Juicy J. Rihanna took pole-dancing lessons from Nicole Williams before the shooting of the music video.

== Background and release ==
"Pour It Up" was written by Michael Williams, Justin Garner, Theron Thomas and Timothy Thomas (Planet VI). Rihanna is an additional cowriter of the song. It was produced by Williams under his stage name Mike Will Made It, while being co-produced by JBo of Eardrummer Ent. Williams stated in an interview with MTV News that he had produced multiple records for Rihanna for Unapologetic. He submitted three tracks in total, with "Pour It Up" making the track list. "Pour It Up" was released to urban radio in the United States on January 8, 2013, as the second single in the country following Unapologetic's lead single, "Diamonds". Over three months later, following the success of the song on the format, it was sent to contemporary hit radio on April 9.

== Composition ==
"Pour It Up" is a club, trap and R&B song, with a minimal hip hop beat. Lyrically, it finds Rihanna turning a strip-club anthem into a declaration of independence, pulling out her dollar bills at the strip club, getting drunk, and bragging loudly. A part of the song hears Rihanna bragging about how she is rich and can pay for a $100 valet service and a night at the strip club. "All I see is signs, all I see is dollar signs", she declares. "Throw it up / throw it up / watch it all fall out / Pour it up / Pour it up / That's how we ball out", she chants over a "hypnotic" beat and "handclaps". Rihanna's vocals span from the low note of F♯_{3} to the high note of A_{4}.

== Critical reception ==
"Pour It Up" received mixed reviews from music critics. Andy Kellman of AllMusic called it "convincing", writing that "she's at her best when she's flaunting". Kellman also noted that "Pour It Up" is "a characteristically chilly and booming Mike Will collaboration", also praising "Rihanna's trash talk", writing that "it's something else". Jon Caramanica of The New York Times commented that, "it sounds like a track the ambient-goth outfit Salem might make for a strip club." Alex Macpherson of Fact wrote that on 'Pour It Up', "Rihanna goes through mere scornful contempt and terrifies with her blank, relentless focus." Caryn Ganz of Spin called it "moody and murky". Andrew Hampp of Billboard named it "an irresistible, Mike WiLL-produced banger for the ladies."

Jessica Hopper of Pitchfork Media was also mixed, writing that on 'Pour It Up,' "she sounds alternately robotic and narcotized." Dan Martin of NME criticized the song for "killing the mood", calling it an "In Da Club guff". Philip Matusavage of MusicOMH was negative, commenting that the "sense of emotional trauma displays itself in a different way on the album", calling it "obnoxious", while Randall Roberts of the Los Angeles Times named it "a nausea-inducing track". Sarah H. Grant of Consequence of Sound reflected that, "the effervescence of her breakthrough Good Girl Gone Bad is lost to some hopeless place", citing "Pour It Up" as an example.

Cultural critic Camille Paglia praised the song in an August 2013 interview: "in the past year, the only things that sparked my enthusiasm and gave me hope for an artistic revival were in pop music... [one being] Rihanna’s eerie “Pour It Up,” which uses a strip club as a hallucinatory metaphor for an identity crisis about sex and materialism."

== Commercial performance ==
Upon the release of Unapologetic, "Pour It Up" debuted at number 191 on the French Singles Chart. Over three months later, the song re-entered the chart at 199 for the date issued March 23, 2013, climbed to a new peak of number 102 the following week. It debuted at number 90 on the Billboard Hot 100 for the issue dated January 19, 2013, since reaching a Top 20 peak of number 19. For the issue dated March 2, 2013, "Pour It Up" reached number one on the US Hot R&B/Hip-Hop Airplay chart, becoming Rihanna's second number one on the chart from 30 entries. It has remained atop the chart for five consecutive weeks. It has subsequently charted at number six on the US Hot R&B/Hip-Hop Songs chart. As of May 2013, the song had sold more than one million copies in the United States. In its ninth week on the chart, "Pour It Up" entered the UK R&B Chart at number 40 for the issue dated March 30, 2013. It climbed to number 22 the following week.

== Music video ==
The official music video for "Pour It Up" was filmed in May 2013. In September 2013, the director Vincent Haycock, tweeted that he was no longer involved with the project due to "creative differences", Rihanna later replied to him by stating: "Just take your name off the check while u at it! Whatever your issue is leave my fans out of it". That same month, Rihanna posted new behind the scenes pictures from the shoot and stated that the video would be released in October 2013. The video was released on her official YouTube channel October 2, 2013, but became unlisted 30 minutes after release. It was later uploaded on Rihanna's official VEVO account. The visual features Rihanna starring as a stripper writhing around and grinding on a giant golden throne, scantily clad in a diamond bra and a denim thong while strippers slide down poles positioned, amid a giant pool of water behind her. It also features the singer chucking a load of money around.

Rolling Stone said the video which is not of "high art certainly matches the lavish strip-club exploits referenced in the song." HitFix gave the video a D grade, "it' s a dimly lit video equivalent of a Playboy photo spread that is meant to serve the very same purpose for the boys and men who view it. And we're all supposed to scrape and bow and talk about how 'artfully' it's shot and pretend that it’s so very empowering for her to show off her body this way."

Just like Rihanna's previous videos for S&M and We Found Love (2011) were controversial for erotic imagery and sexual content, the video was deemed controversial in France, with the national broadcasting commission limiting French music channels to only broadcast it after 10 p.m, beginning with the disclaimer; Not advised to kids under 12 years old or Not advised to kids under 16 years old (in french : deconseillé aux moins de 12 ans ou moins de 16 ans).

== Live performances ==
"Pour It Up" was included in the set list as part of Rihanna's Diamonds World Tour. On February 25, 2014, Rihanna performed the song during Drake's sold-out concert at Palais Omnisports de Paris-Bercy in Paris, France, as part of his Would You like a Tour? tour. She also performed the song at the 2016 MTV Video Music Awards. "Pour It Up" was also included in the set list of Rihanna's performance at the Super Bowl LVII halftime show.

== Remixes and covers ==
On January 24, 2013, a freestyle cover of "Pour It Up" was released by rapper Trina. On February 4, 2013, American rapper Lil' Kim covered "Pour it Up" featuring her boyfriend "Mr. Papers". On March 6, 2013, rappers French Montana and Chinx Drugz released a cover of the single. Redlight and Seb Chew also remixed the song in the form of a bootleg titled "Pour It Zero's". Nigerian Hiphop/Pop duo Young Paperboyz also released their remix of "Pour It Up". Italian rapper Jesto featuring Briga and Killa Cali remixed the song making the Italian version called Fatti l'uno x l'altra.

On March 4, 2013, it was reported that Rihanna was enlisting various rappers for an official remix of "Pour It Up". The reports speculated guest appearances from American rappers Juicy J, 2 Chainz, T.I., Rick Ross and Young Jeezy. The official remix was released on March 20, 2013, featuring all but 2 Chainz, but sometime later, another unmastered version of the remix was released, with 2 Chainz rapping a verse after T.I.. With Rihanna's verses remaining the same, Jeezy begins rapping about "throwing hundreds" and "listening to Kendrick Lamar". Rick Ross then continues, "Dollar after dollar / Bottle after Bottle / Late for you haters even though my plane chartered", and rapping about "sexy ladies". This is followed by a verse from Juicy J promising "I'll make it rain, shawty / You might need a raincoat", and finally a verse from T.I.

Michael Depland of MTV said, "While we may never get a proper "Pour It Up" video, we DO (sic) have the next best thing: a brand-new remix featuring Young Jeezy, Rick Ross, Juicy J, and T.I. Can you imagine if all those dudes rolled through a strip club together? Every dancer in the place could probably retire that night! With all these hip-hop titans on this naughty track, the only rapper we can figure that's missing is Drake. He did recently drop $50,000 in a strip club, but we understand why he may have been left out of this particular remix. When a dude has legal issues with your boyfriend, you probably wouldn't invite him to collabo." Joe Lynch of Fuse noted the addition of both Rick Ross and Young Jeezy saying, "Even though Rick Ross said he "tried to finger" Young Jeezy at the BET Hip Hop Awards last September, the two rappers have put aside their backstage beef for a higher power: Rihanna. Well, Rihanna and/or money."

== Track listing ==
- Original radio single
1. "Pour It Up" – 2:48
- Digital remix single
1. "Pour It Up (Remix)" (featuring Young Jeezy, Rick Ross, Juicy J, and T.I.) – 5:08

== Credits and personnel ==
Recording

- Recorded at Westlake Recording Studios, Los Angeles, California.
- Mixed at Larabee Studios, Burbank, California.

Personnel

- Lead vocals – Rihanna
- Songwriting – Robyn Fenty, Michael Williams, Justin Garner, Theron Thomas, Timothy Thomas
- Production – Michael Williams, Justin Garner
- Music Recording – Alejandro Barajas
- Vocal production – Kuk Harrell
- Vocal recording – Kuk Harrell, Marcos Tovar
- Mixing – Manny Marroquin
- All instruments and programming – Michael Williams, Justin Garner

Credits adapted from the liner notes of Unapologetic, Def Jam Recordings, SRP Records.

== Charts ==
=== Weekly charts ===
Chart (2013)	Peak position
Australia (ARIA)	55
Belgium (Ultratip Bubbling Under Flanders)	18
Belgium (Ultratip Bubbling Under Wallonia)	17
Canada Hot 100 (Billboard)	49
Czech Republic Airplay (ČNS IFPI)	75
France (SNEP)	81
Ireland (IRMA)	56
UK Hip Hop/R&B (Official Charts)	8
UK Singles (Official Charts)	43
US Billboard Hot 100	19
US Hot R&B/Hip-Hop Songs (Billboard)	6
US Dance Club Songs (Billboard)	29
US Rhythmic Airplay (Billboard)	2

Chart (2023)	Peak position
US Digital Song Sales (Billboard)	49

=== Year-end charts ===
Chart (2013)	Position
US Billboard Hot 100	70
US Hot R&B/Hip-Hop Songs (Billboard)	16
US Rhythmic (Billboard)	16

== Certifications ==
Region	Certification	Certified units/sales
Australia (ARIA)	2× Platinum	140,000^{‡}
Brazil (Pro-Música Brasil)	2× Platinum	120,000^{‡}
Denmark (IFPI Danmark)	Gold	45,000^{‡}
New Zealand (RMNZ)	2× Platinum	60,000^{‡}
United Kingdom (BPI)	Platinum	600,000^{‡}
United States (RIAA)	3× Platinum	3,000,000^{‡}
^{‡} Sales+streaming figures based on certification alone.

== Release history ==
Country	Date	Format	Version	Label	Ref.
United States	January 8, 2013	Urban radio	Original	Def Jam Recordings	
Austria	March 20, 2013	Digital download	Remix	Universal Music	
Canada	March 20, 2013	Digital download	Remix	Universal Music	
Denmark	March 20, 2013	Digital download	Remix	Universal Music	
Finland	March 20, 2013	Digital download	Remix	Universal Music	
France	March 20, 2013	Digital download	Remix	Universal Music	
Germany	March 20, 2013	Digital download	Remix	Universal Music	
Italy	March 20, 2013	Digital download	Remix	Universal Music	
Netherlands	March 20, 2013	Digital download	Remix	Universal Music	
New Zealand	March 20, 2013	Digital download	Remix	Universal Music	
Norway	March 20, 2013	Digital download	Remix	Universal Music	
Spain	March 20, 2013	Digital download	Remix	Universal Music	
Sweden	March 20, 2013	Digital download	Remix	Universal Music	
Switzerland	March 20, 2013	Digital download	Remix	Universal Music	
United Kingdom	March 20, 2013	Digital download	Remix	Mercury Records	
United States	March 20, 2013	Digital download	Remix	Def Jam Records	
Australia	March 22, 2013	Digital download	Remix	Universal Music	
United Kingdom	April 3, 2013	Contemporary hit radio	Original	Def Jam Recordings	
United States	April 9, 2013	Contemporary hit radio	Original	Def Jam Recordings	
United Kingdom	April 18, 2013	Urban radio	Original	Def Jam Recordings	
