= Phresh Out the Runway =

Song by Rihanna

from the album Unapologetic
- Recorded: 2012
- Studio: Sarm Studios and Metropolis Studios (London); R Studios (Los Angeles)
- Genre: Hip hop; rave
- Length: 3:42
- Label: Def Jam; SRP
- Songwriters: David Guetta; Giorgio Tuinfort; Terius Nash; Robyn Fenty
- Producers: David Guetta; Giorgio Tuinfort; Terius Nash

"Phresh Out the Runway" is a song recorded by Barbadian recording artist Rihanna for her seventh studio album Unapologetic (2012). It was co-written by Rihanna with French disc-jockey David Guetta, Giorgio Tuinfort and Terius Nash. It is the first time that Rihanna and Guetta had collaborated since "Who's That Chick?", released in November 2010. "Phresh Out the Runway" is a hip hop and rave song that contains heavy synthesizers and bass. Lyrically, Rihanna explains how if any of her crew does not respect her, they should no longer remain with her.

"Phresh Out the Runway" received positive reviews from music critics; most of them praised the composition, production and how Rihanna interpreted the song. However, the lyrics were subjected to criticism. Rihanna performed the track at the Victoria's Secret Fashion Show on November 7, 2012, along with the album's lead single, "Diamonds". "Phresh Out the Runway" was included on the set list of the 777 Tour promotional tour and the Diamonds World Tour. Upon the release of Unapologetic, the song debuted at number 35 on the UK R&B Chart and 177 on the UK Singles Chart. It also debuted on the US R&B Songs chart at number 21.

== Background and production ==
Rihanna began "working on the new sound" for her seventh studio album in March 2012, even though she had not yet begun recording. On September 12, 2012, Def Jam France announced via Twitter that Rihanna would release a new single the upcoming week while her seventh studio album was scheduled to be released in November 2012. However, the tweet was shortly deleted and replaced with another clarifying that "more information will be made available tomorrow, Thursday, September 13". Via her official Twitter account, Rihanna posted series of "teasing" tweets announcing her seventh studio album.

On November 6, 2012, Rihanna revealed that there would be "another secret collab" on the album. She hinted at the identity: "Guess who is featured on the #7th song on #Unapologetic, Hint: his birthday is tomorrow November #7th." In a followed tweet, she explicitly revealed that the secret artist is the French disk-jockey David Guetta and announced that he produced "Phresh Out the Runway" along with "Right Now" for her seventh studio album Unapologetic. Rihanna and Guetta have previously collaborated on "Who's That Chick?" (2010), which is included in the re-release of his second studio album One Love (2009), entitled One More Love (2010).

"Phresh Out the Runway" was co-written by Rihanna herself, Terius Nash and Giorgio Tuinfort. Production of the song was helmed by Guetta, Tuinfort as well as Nash under his production name Terius Nash. Josh Campbell engineered the song, with assistance from Joel Peters at SARM Studios in London. Rihanna's vocals were recorded by Marcos Tovar and Kuk Harrell at R Studios in Los Angeles, California; Harrell also handled production of Rihanna's vocals. All instrumentation and programming was carried out by Guetta, Tuinfort and Nash. The song was finally mixed by Jaycen Joshua at SARM Studios and Metropolis Studios in London.

== Composition and lyrical interpretation ==
"Phresh Out the Runway" is a hip hop and rave song, with a duration of three minutes and forty-two seconds. Jon Caramanica of The New York Times noted that the song's composition is a "chaotic dense spray of boasts over a muscular, scraping beat". Brad Stern of MTV Buzzworthy labeled the song as "noisy, trap-tastic twerker" that is reminiscent of Rihanna's 2012 single "Birthday Cake" and according to him, contains blazin' beats, brags aplenty, nasty unapologetic attitude. Alexis Petridis of The Guardian noted that "Phresh Out the Runway" is an aggregation off "distorted" synthesisers derived from Joey Beltram's 1990 record "Mentasm" "until it sounds weird and disorientating". The Boston Globe's James Reed labeled "Phresh Out the Runway" as a club banger containing a heavy bass "that rumbles more in your chest instead of rattling your feet." Alex Macpherson of Fact wrote that on the song "Rihanna sprays declamations like machine gun fire over what could pass for a lost early ’90s Prodigy rave anthem." The lyrical content of "Phresh Out the Runway" revolves around Rihanna explaining how if any of her crew does not respect her, then she should no longer remain with her, singing: "How could you be so hood, but you're so fuckin' pop?/ How could you be so fun and sound like you're selling rocks?". On the song, Rihanna sounds "indignant" and "impressed" with being herself and proclaims: "Walk up in this bitch like I own the ho".

== Critical reception ==
"Phresh Out the Runway" received positive reviews from most music critics. Dan Martin for NME commented, "French overlord of the genre, David Guetta, is present, and his contributions on tracks like the opener 'Phresh Out the Runway' are largely box-ticking exercises to illustrate Rihanna's commitment to making loads of money, but they're at least subtle." Chris Youine for 4Music concluded that there is not doubt that the song is a "bold, brash and unapologetic opener of the album". Nathan S. for DJ Booth wrote that the song "finds Rihanna on the verge of just straight out rhyming"; according to him her rhyming is pretty well. Esquire's Miles Raymer commented that Rihanna is party girl and because of that every of her albums has one song with you can get crazy; according to Raymer in this case is "Phresh Out the Runway" which if it is played in proper volume it can be "handbanging".

Greg Kot for Chicago Tribune concluded that the song together with "Jump" and "Pour It Up" celebrates "live-for-the-moment hedonism". Smokey Fontaine for The Huffington Post called it a "loud" and "as-curse filled" for it can capture the album's title and reminds the parents that Rihanna's music is not yet for their kids. Bernard Perusse for The Montreal Gazette criticized the song and called it a "robotic whomp and f-bomb shtick", that rapidly creates "a melody-free, pedestrian turf". Pitchfork's Jessica Hopper wrote that "'Phresh Out the Runway' is capitalist braggadocio (nonsense grade) so static it borders on unmusical." Sarah H. Grant of Consequence of Sound called both "Right Now" and "Phresh Out the Runway" "texturally layered", but "lyrically barren".

== Live performances and usage in media ==
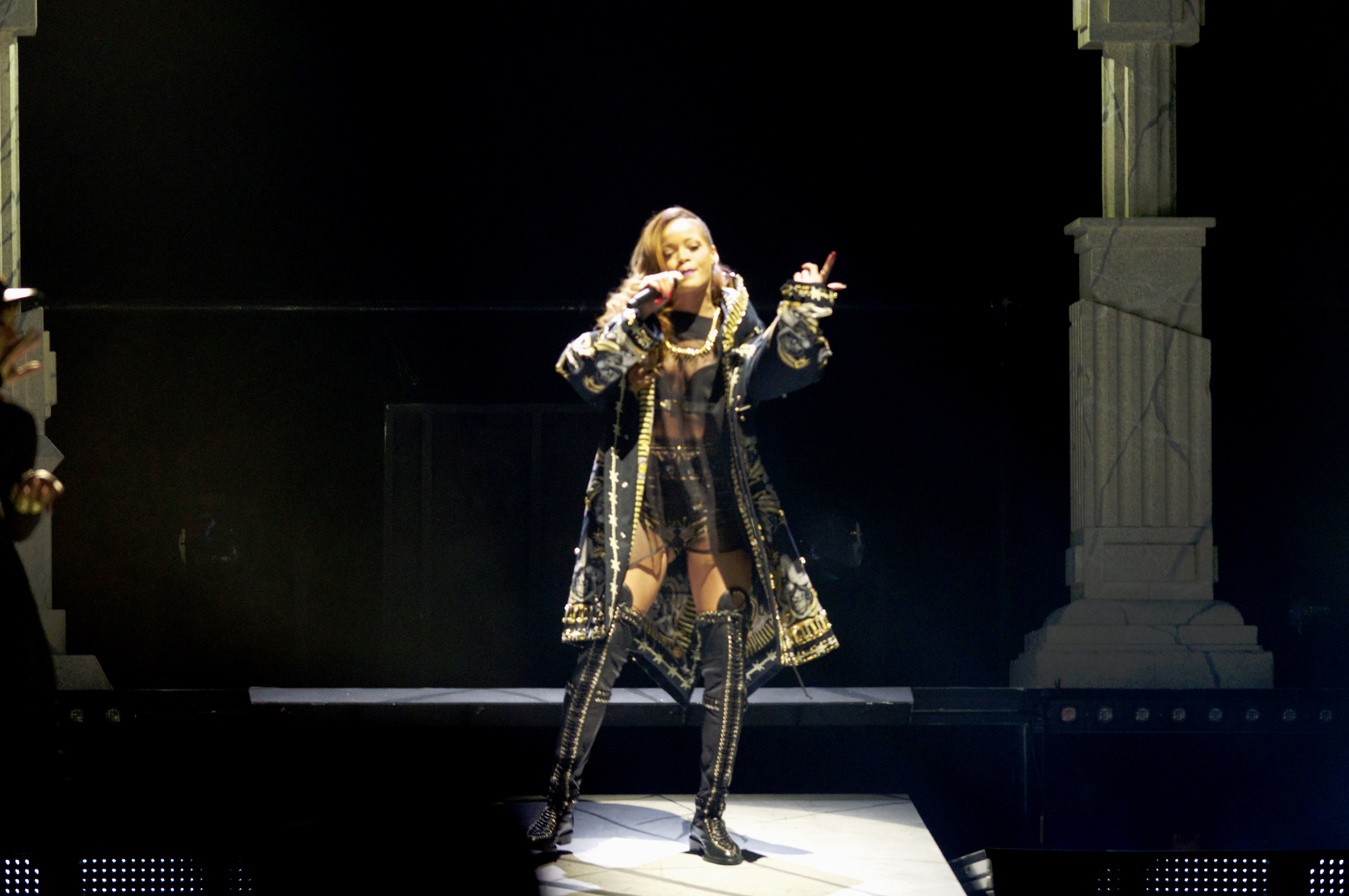
Rihanna performing "Phresh Out the Runway" during the Diamonds World Tour in 2013

Rihanna performed "Phresh Out the Runway" for the first time at the Victoria's Secret Fashion Show alongside "Diamonds", on November 7, 2012. She wore a pink sheer lingerie set for the performance, for the "Angels in Bloom" segment of the show. The show aired on December 4, 2012, on CBS, and Rihanna garnered enormous praise for her performance.

During the seven days prior to the release of the album, Rihanna embarked on the 777 Tour, a seven-date promotional tour where she performed seven concerts in seven cities in seven countries across North America and Europe. "Phresh Out the Runway" was included on the set list at the first concert in Mexico City, at the second concert in Toronto. Rihanna performed the song again at the third concert in Stockholm. Jack Rosenthal for Rolling Stone commented that performing the song appeared to be an "uphill climb" for Rihanna during the first two dates in Mexico City and Toronto, but felt that she looked more comfortable performing on the third date in Stockholm, writing "she sings it looking over her shoulder, a breezy afterthought." She also included the song in her setlist for her Diamonds World Tour.

"Phresh Out the Runway" was featured at the end of the season three eighth episode of the American police procedural drama TV series, Hawaii Five-0.

== Credits and personnel ==
Recording

- Recorded at SARM Studios, Notting Hill, London, UK; R Studios, Los Angeles, California; Metropolis Studios, London, UK.
- Mixed at Larrabee Recording Studios, Burbank, California.

Personnel

- Lead vocals – Rihanna
- Songwriting – David Guetta, Giorgio Tuinfort, Terius Nash, Robyn Fenty
- Production – David Guetta, Giorgio Tuinfort, Terius Nash
- Vocal production – Kuk Harrell
- Vocal recording – Kuk Harrell, Marcos Tovar
- Additional vocal recording – Bart Schoudel
- Recording engineer – Josh Campbell
- Assistant engineer – Joel Peters
- Assistant engineering – Ben Rhodes, Tom Hough
- Mixing – Jaycen Joshua
- All instruments/programming – David Guetta, Giorgio Tuinfort, Terius Nash
- Additional Drum programming and mixing – MJ

Credits adapted from the liner notes of Unapologetic, Def Jam Recordings, SRP Records.

== Charts ==
Upon the release of Unapologetic, "Phresh Out the Runway" debuted on the UK R&B Chart at number 35 on November 25, 2012. It debuted on the UK Singles Chart at number 177. The song debuted at number 21 on the US R&B Songs chart for the issue dated December 22, 2012, and peaked at number 46 on the R&B/Hip-hop Digital Songs chart on December 3, 2012.

Chart (2012)	Peak position
France (SNEP)	185
UK R&B Chart (OCC)	35
UK Singles Chart (OCC)	177
US R&B Songs (Billboard)	21
US R&B/Hip-Hop Digital Songs (Billboard)	46
