= Surface web =

Websites and pages easily accessible to user agents

The surface web (also called the visible web, indexed web, or indexable web) is the portion of the World Wide Web that is readily available to the general public and searchable with standard web search engines.

== Overview ==
It is the highest layer of the World Wide Web, the other two being the deep web, the area not accessible via standard search engines, and the Dark web, the area with your IP address, and therefore your identity, hidden. The Surface Web only consists of 10 percent of the information that is on the internet.

The Surface Web is made with a collection of public web pages on a server accessible by any search engine.

According to one source, as of June 14, 2015, Google's Index of the Surface Web contains about 14.8 billion pages.

== See also ==
- Clearnet (networking)
