= Loveeeeeee Song =

Song by Rihanna featuring Future

from the album Unapologetic
- Released: November 19, 2012
- Recorded: 2012
- Studio: Westlake (Los Angeles); Triangle Studios (Atlanta)
- Genre: R&B
- Length: 4:16
- Label: Def Jam; SRP
- Songwriters: Nayvadius Wilburn; Denisia "Blu June" Andrews; Robyn Fenty
- Producers: DJ Luney Tunez; Mex Manny; Future

"Loveeeeeee Song" is a song recorded by Barbadian singer Rihanna featuring American rapper Future for the former's seventh studio album, Unapologetic (2012). It was released on November 19, 2012, as the album's fifth track, through Def Jam Recordings and SRP Records. Rihanna and Denisia "Blu June" Andrews wrote the "druggy slab of sci-fi" R&B song alongside its producers, DJ Luney Tunez, Mex Manny, and Future. It was also recorded at Westlake Recording Studios in Los Angeles, California, and Triangle Studios in Atlanta, Georgia. The song received favorable reviews from music critics, some of whom complimented Rihanna's vocals and called it a standout track, while others called the song a "touching duet".

Following the release of Unapologetic, as a result of strong digital downloads, "Loveeeeeee Song" charted on multiple charts worldwide; it peaked at number 55 on the US Billboard Hot 100, number 14 on the US Hot R&B/Hip-Hop Songs chart, number 27 on the US Rhythmic Airplay chart, number 110 in France, number 105 on the UK Singles Chart, and number 17 on the UK Hip Hop and R&B Singles Chart. It was certified double platinum by the Australian Recording Industry Association (ARIA) and Recorded Music NZ (RMNZ), platinum by the British Phonographic Industry (BPI) and the Recording Industry Association of America (RIAA), and gold by Pro-Música Brasil (PMB). The song was also included on the set list of her fifth concert tour, the Diamonds World Tour (2013).

== Background and production ==
In March 2012, Rihanna began "working on the new sound" for her seventh studio album, even though she had not yet begun recording. On September 12, 2012, Def Jam France announced via Twitter that Rihanna would release a new single the upcoming week while her seventh studio album was scheduled to be released in November 2012. On October 11, 2012, in one of her tweets revealed that the title of her new album is Unapologetic along with its cover. On November 6, the singer posted the official track listing of the album, on which there was a song titled "Loveeeeeee Song" that featured American rapper Future.

Seth Firkins recorded the music for "Loveeeeeee Song" together with Future's vocals at Triangle Studios in Atlanta, Georgia. Rihanna's vocals were recorded by Marcus Tovar and Kuk Harrell at Westlake Recording Studios in Los Angeles, California, while it was mixed by Manny Marroquin at Larrabee Studios in Burbank, California. Harrell also handled production of Rihanna's vocals. All instrumentation and programming were carried out by Future, who appears as courtesy of Epic Records.

== Composition ==
"It was a record that I didn't spend that much time on either. Less thought, [so] it was more natural."

— Future talking about "Loveeeeeee Song" for MTV News"

"Loveeeeeee Song" is a "druggy slab of sci-fi" R&B song and is also the fifth track on the album, with a length of four minutes and sixteen seconds. Co-producer Luney Tunez spoke about the process of working on it. In an interview with Complex he stated, "that was one of the beats I really don't like. It wasn't one of my favorites. When I made it, I was in the mindset of being real, melodic, laid back, and sexy." He further added that from the beginning he was aware that the song would be a "pop-female record" and that he also didn't want to put too many instruments in it. Luney Tunez labeled it as one of the favorite songs that he has ever produced.

In an interview for MTV News, Future spoke about collaborating with Rihanna: "They wanted a more uptempo record, so I sent four or five records, and I left the last record. It was more like a ballad, and I left it." He further revealed that the original title of the song was "Love & Affection", however, Rihanna's mentor Jay-Z changed it to "Love Song" and added two additional 'e's becoming "Loveee Song". The song starts with Future "slow-rolling track singing in his computerized drawl" the lyrics, "I don't want to give you the wrong impression, I need love and affection" and croons before Rihanna starts singing, "I want you now, I want you now." It ends with him saying "L O V E E E and affection". The song was composed in the key of B♭major and set in common time signature, and has a moderately fast tempo of 116 beats per minute. Rihanna and Future's vocals span from the low note of F_{3} to the high note of F_{5}.

== Reception ==
Caryn Ganz of Spin called the song a slow jam, while The New York Times's Jon Caramanica labeled it as a striking and affecting duet. Shamika Sanders of Hello Beautiful called the song a "stand-out track" on the album and concluded that Future's rapping and singing vocals "find a nestled residence beside Rihanna's sensual register. Together, they create a harmonious mixture of bedroom magic". According to Sarah H. Grant of Consequence, "Loveeeeeee Song" is an "emotionally fragmented" and a "touching duet" with Future. Digital Spy's Robert Copsey wrote that the song is one of the few ballads on Unapologetic that can touch you deeper than the average slow songs. According to him, the reason for that is the circumstances with American singer Chris Brown that are felt throughout the whole album. In a review of Unapologetic, Alex Macpherson of Fact wrote that "Loveeeeeee Song" "is a boilerplate Future space ballad with an unforgivably stupid title".

In North America, "Loveeeeeee Song" peaked at number 55 on the US Billboard Hot 100 and number 14 on the US Hot R&B/Hip-Hop Songs chart. On airplay charts, it peaked at 27 on Rhythmic Airplay. It was certified platinum by the Recording Industry Association of America (RIAA). In South America, it was certified gold by Pro-Música Brasil (PMB). In Europe, the song peaked at number 110 in France, number 105 on the UK Singles Chart, and number 17 on the UK Hip Hop and R&B Singles Chart. It was certified platinum by the British Phonographic Industry (BPI). In Oceania, it was certified double platinum by the Australian Recording Industry Association (ARIA) and Recorded Music NZ (RMNZ).

== Credits and personnel ==
Credits are adapted from the liner notes of Unapologetic.

=== Recording ===
- Recorded at Westlake Recording Studios, Los Angeles, California; Triangle Studios, Atlanta, Georgia.
- Mixed at Larrabee Studios, Burbank, California.

=== Personnel ===
- Vocals – Rihanna, Future
- Featured artist – Future
- Songwriting – Nayvadius Wilburn, Denisea "Blu June" Andrews, Robyn Fenty
- Production – Luney Tunez and E. Zaragoza p/k/a (Mex Manny) and Future
- Future's performance recorded & engineered by – Seth Firkins
- Vocal production – Kuk Harrell
- Rihanna's Vocals recorded by – Kuk Harrell, Marcos Tovar
- Assistant engineer – Robert Cohen
- Mixing – Manny Marroquin
- All instruments and programming – Future

== Charts ==
Chart performance for "Loveeeeeee Song"
Chart (2012–2013)	Peak position
France (SNEP)	110
UK Singles (Official Charts)	105
UK Hip Hop/R&B (Official Charts)	17
US Billboard Hot 100	55
US Hot R&B/Hip-Hop Songs (Billboard)	14
US Rhythmic Airplay (Billboard)	27

== Certifications ==
Certifications for "Loveeeeeee Song"
Region	Certification	Certified units/sales
Australia (ARIA)	2× Platinum	140,000^{‡}
Brazil (Pro-Música Brasil)	Gold	30,000^{‡}
New Zealand (RMNZ)	2× Platinum	60,000^{‡}
United Kingdom (BPI)	Platinum	600,000^{‡}
United States (RIAA)	Platinum	1,000,000^{‡}
^{‡} Sales+streaming figures based on certification alone.
