= Scirus =

Scientific search engine, 2001–2014

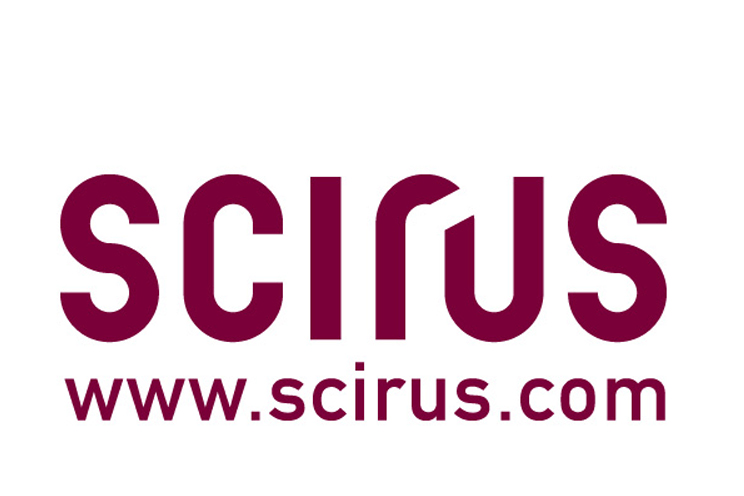
- Languages: English

Access
- Providers: Elsevier

Coverage
- Disciplines: Life Sciences; Social Sciences; Physical Sciences; Health Sciences
- Temporal coverage: 2001-2014
- Geospatial coverage: Worldwide
- No. of records: 167 million pages

Links
- Website: www.scirus.com

Scirus was a comprehensive science-specific search engine, first launched in 2001. Like CiteSeerX and Google Scholar, it was focused on scientific information. Unlike CiteSeerX, Scirus was not only for computer sciences and IT and not all of the results included full text. It also sent its scientific search results to Scopus, an abstract and citation database covering scientific research output globally. Scirus was owned and operated by Elsevier. In 2013 an announcement appeared, on the Scirus homepage, announcing the site's retirement in 2014:

"We are sad to say goodbye. Scirus is set to retire in early 2014. An official retirement date will be posted here as soon as it is determined. To ensure a smooth transition, we are informing you now so that you have sufficient time to find an alternative search solution for science-specific content. Thank you for being a devoted user of Scirus. We have enjoyed serving you."

By February 2014, the Scirus homepage indicated that the service was no longer running.

== See also ==
- Academic databases and search engines
- Author-level metrics
- CiteSeerX
- Impact factor
