= All of the Lights =

2010 single by Kanye West featuring Rihanna and Kid Cudi

Single by Kanye West featuring Rihanna and Kid Cudi

from the album My Beautiful Dark Twisted Fantasy
- Released: January 18, 2011
- Recorded: 2009–2010
- Studio: Avex Recording Studios (Honolulu, HI); Electric Lady Studios (New York City, NY); Westlake Recording Studios (Los Angeles, CA)
- Genre: Hip hop; R&B
- Length: 4:20 (radio edit); 5:00 (album version)
- Label: Roc-A-Fella; Def Jam
- Songwriters: Kanye West; Scott Mescudi; Jeffrey Bhasker; Stacy Ferguson; Terius Nash; Malik Yusef; Warren Trotter
- Producers: Kanye West; Jeff Bhasker

Kanye West singles chronology
| "Hurricane 2.0" (2010) | "All of the Lights" (2011) | "Christmas in Harlem" (2010) |

Rihanna singles chronology
| "Raining Men" (2010) | "All of the Lights" (2011) | "S&M" (2011) |

Kid Cudi singles chronology
| "Mr. Rager" (2010) | "All of the Lights" (2011) | "No One Believes Me" (2011) |

Music videos
- "All of the Lights" on YouTube
- "All of the Lights (Revised)" on YouTube

"All of the Lights" is a song by American rapper Kanye West, released as the fourth single from his fifth studio album, My Beautiful Dark Twisted Fantasy (2010). It was produced by West and features additional vocals from several other recording artists, including John Legend, The-Dream, Drake, Alicia Keys, Fergie, Elton John, Ryan Leslie, Charlie Wilson, Tony Williams, La Roux, Alvin Fields, Ken Lewis, Kid Cudi, and Rihanna; the latter two are credited on the official music video and single version, but not on the album version. It is often played along with its accompanying interlude "All of the Lights (Interlude)", which precedes the song on the album's tracklist.

"All of the Lights" was universally acclaimed by music critics, who complimented its detailed, maximalist production and dramatic theme. It was commercially successful in the U.S., peaking at number 18 on the Billboard Hot 100 and number 2 on the Hot R&B/Hip-Hop Songs; it landed at number 59 At the 54th Annual Grammy Awards, the song won Grammy Awards for Best Rap Song and Best Rap/Sung Collaboration, and was nominated for Song of the Year. By December 2011, the song had sold over 1,561,000 digital units in the US. It has been certified septuple Platinum by the RIAA.

The song's accompanying music video, directed by Hype Williams, featured strobe-lit performances of Rihanna and West, as well as Kid Cudi. It was given a discretionary warning by Epilepsy Action, stating that the video "potentially triggers seizures for people with photosensitive epilepsy". West and Rihanna performed the song at the 2011 NBA All-Star Game, while it was also featured in the promo for the same event. A snippet of the song was performed by Rihanna at the 2023 Super Bowl Halftime Show.

== Background and recording ==
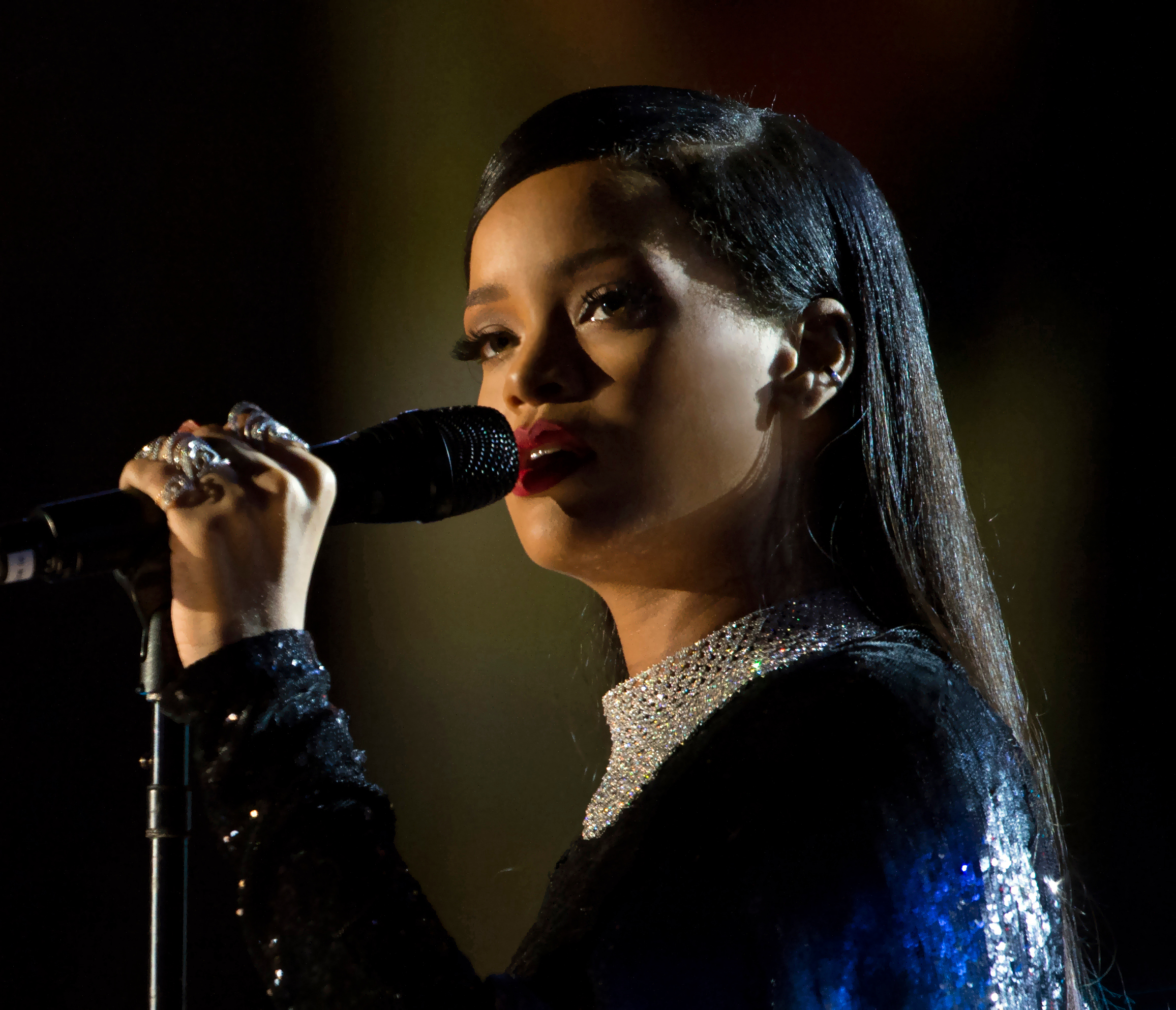
Fourteen artists lent their voices as background vocals on "All of the Lights" including Rihanna (pictured) who also sang the song's hook.

"All of the Lights" was written by Kanye West, Jeff Bhasker, Malik Jones, Warren Trotter, Stacy Ferguson and Terius Nash. Its production was helmed by West himself and co-produced by Bhasker. Fourteen artists lent their voices as background vocals to the song: Alicia Keys, John Legend, The-Dream, Drake, Fergie, Kid Cudi, Elton John, Ryan Leslie, Charlie Wilson, Tony Williams, La Roux, Alvin Fields, Ken Lewis, and Rihanna, who also sang the song's hook and is labeled as a featured artist on the single version. West and Rihanna previously collaborated with Jay-Z on "Run This Town" (The Blueprint 3, 2009).

The early working title for "All of The Lights" was previously "Ghetto University" when the production on the song was just beginning. Songwriter Malik Yusef revealed that the original demo for the song contained a sample of Muhammad Ali saying "The champ is here"; Yusef attempted to create rhymes around it, but ended up telling the engineer to remove the sample to clear space on the song. After having taken the sample out, Yusef eventually came up with the "all of the lights" part after thinking about his son's first words, which were "light";

I thought, light is a beautiful word. There's all kinds of light–there's sunlight, there's flashlight, there's strobe lights, there's night lights, there's streetlights...all of the lights. When I said that, a literal light went off in my brain, I was like [singing] "All of the lights, all of the lights". I had it. I went upstairs and told Rick Ross, "I've got it", he said "you sure?" and I said, "I got it!" Jeff Bhasker was in there and he came down, we recorded it, and it just started after that.

In a 2013 interview with The Breakfast Club, West said that the song took two years to finish, and detailed the creation and process of the song;

"'All The Lights' is a futurist song that started out as a Jeezy record with horns on it, then we put in another bridge, then Dream wrote the hook, then Rihanna sang it, and by the time you got it, it was to the level of like, the Nike Flyknit or something like that.

During the 2010 MTV Europe Music Awards, on November 10, 2010, Rihanna was interviewed by MTV News' staff. In the interview she explained that, West already played his album to her three months ago and that "All of the Lights" was one of her favorite songs. About it, she further commented, "So when he asked me to come up to the studio at 2 o'clock in the morning, I had to, because I loved it, I knew it was that song."

In an interview for the same publication, Elly Jackson said of the song's vocal layering, "He got me to layer up all these vocals with other people, and he just basically wanted to use his favorite vocalists from around the world to create this really unique vocal texture on his record, but it's not the kind of thing where you can pick it out". Andrew Dawson, Anthony Kilhoffer, Mike Dean, HI and Noah Goldstein recorded West's vocals at Avex Recording Studios in Honolulu, Hawaii and Electric Lady Studios in New York City. Rihanna's vocals were recorded by Marcos Tovar at the Westlake Recording Studios in West Hollywood, California.

== Composition ==
"All of the Lights"
According to AllMusic's Andy Kellman, the song exemplifies its album's contrasting elements and is "a celebration of fame and a lament of its consequences".

"All of the Lights" is a hip hop song that runs for 4 minutes and 59 seconds. According to the sheet music published by Universal Music Publishing Group at Musicnotes.com, it was composed in the key of B-flat minor using common time and a steady groove. The vocal range spans from the low note of A♭_{3}> to the high note of F_{5}. Instrumentation is provided by drums, bass, piano and horns. The piano is played by Elton John, who also together with thirteen other vocalists provides the background vocals. American singers Fergie and Alicia Keys, sing the break-downs and ad-libs, respectively. Alex Deney from NME called the song a "sleb-studded centrepiece".

== Leaks and release ==
Even though not fully leaked, "All of the Lights" was featured for the first time on Runaway—a 35-minute film about West's "true labor of love" which was released on October 23, 2010. The song was featured in the film together with other songs from West's then-upcoming fifth studio album My Beautiful Dark Twisted Fantasy (2010), including "Monster", "Power" and "Lost in the World" among others. The song fully leaked on November 4, 2010, online.

West announced through his Twitter account that "All of the Lights" would be the album's fourth single. Following the album's release, the song debuted at number 92 on the Billboard Hot 100. It was sent to Australian contemporary hit and alternative radio stations on December 13, 2010. "All of the Lights" was released as a single in the United States on January 18, 2011. Rihanna was credited as a featured artist for the single when impacting radio.

== Critical reception ==
"All of the Lights" received universal critical acclaim. AllMusic's Andy Kellman stated "At once, the song features one of the year’s most rugged beats while supplying enough opulent detail to make Late Registration collaborator Jon Brion's head spin". Alex Denney of NME called it "the sleb-studded centrepiece", commenting that "In anyone else’s hands it’d be an A-list circle-jerk of horrid proportions, but through Kanye’s bar-raising vision it becomes a truly wondrous thing". Zach Baron of The Village Voice found the song's lyrics relevant to the "year of economic suffering", writing that "West interrupted his own wealthy anomie to pen 'All of the Lights,' an incongruously star-stuffed song about a disoriented parolee trying to beat a restraining order and see his daughter, working out a brief reunion with her estranged mother: 'Public visitation, we met at Borders'". Chicago Sun-Times writer Thomas Conner viewed that "as crowded as 'All of the Lights' is [,] it maintains an almost operatic drama, telling a tale of adultery and its aftermath that winds up being quite moving". The Guardian's Kitty Empire cited the song as "the album's most magnificent high", writing that it "backs up operatic levels of sound with great drama".

Ann Powers of NPR included "All of the Lights" in her list of the Top 10 Top 40 singles of 2011, commenting "its like an action painting: the artist scatters elements across its canvas to form a whole that's all motion and colorful build." Slant Magazine named it the best single of 2011, describing the song as "perhaps the most acute example of Kanye West’s pitched mania for theatrical expressions of manic-depressive instability, his mixture of self-destruction and self-love", they later listed it second in their list of the best singles of the 2010s in 2019.

Tampa Bay Times named it the second best pop song of the decade, proclaiming "Everything Kanye West has ever believed himself to be came to life in this song: The stadium-sized horns, the chilling Rihanna hook, the snarl of cockiness in his voice, the insane list of uncredited cameos .. It’s the moment King Midas figured out how to use his touch." Elsewhere, Nothing but Hope and Passion listed it 13th on its list of "100 Must Listen Songs of the 2010s". Time Out named it the 13th best song of all time in 2016.

== Music video and remixes ==
West on a police car in the music video

The music video for "All of the Lights" was filmed in January 2011 and directed by Hype Williams. It features strobe-lit images of Rihanna and West, Kid Cudi in a red leather suit, and visual references to Gaspar Noé's 2009 film Enter the Void. The video premiered through West's Vevo channel on February 19, 2011. After reports of the video's images causing seizures with epileptic viewers and a public response from British organization Epilepsy Action, an alternate video was released that includes a discretionary warning that the video "potentially trigger[s] seizures for people with photosensitive epilepsy", and removed its opening prologue and neon credits. In 2015, the video faced controversy when Gaspar Noé commented on the similarities between the video and Enter the Void, especially the portion where Hype Williams featured his name in the title and credit sequences over and over again.

An earlier version of the song's remix was leaked in 2010, featuring a verse by Drake. On March 14, 2011, an unfinished version of the remix was leaked to the internet, featuring guest verses from Lil Wayne, Big Sean, and Drake, a different verse from the leak. It did not feature West himself, though he did write a verse for it, according to Big Sean.

On May 3, 2023, a version of the song by rapper Lil Uzi Vert was leaked onto Twitter. The few seconds were leaked by Waterfalls, an online user known for leaking songs from popular artists. The snippet has gained traction from social media and music services such as SoundCloud and YouTube. The song was supposed to release on Uzi's third album, Pink Tape.

== Usage in popular culture ==
In 2016, the song was used in a Gatorade commercial starring Serena Williams. The song is also featured in the game NBA 2K14 as part of the soundtrack chosen by LeBron James. In 2019, the song was featured in a Peloton TV commercial, entitled; Our Kind of Joy.

In 2023, Rihanna performed the song's hook as part of the Super Bowl LVII halftime show.

== Accolades ==
| Year | Ceremony | Category | Result | Ref(s) |
|---|---|---|---|---|
| 2011 | BET Awards | Best Collaboration | Nominated | |
| 2011 | BET Hip Hop Awards | Best Hip-Hop Video | Nominated | |
| 2011 | BET Hip Hop Awards | Viewer's Choice | Nominated | |
| 2011 | MP3 Music Awards | Best Hip Hop/R&B/Rap | Won | |
| 2011 | MTV Video Music Awards | Best Male Video | Nominated | |
| 2011 | MTV Video Music Awards | Best Editing | Nominated | |
| 2011 | MTV Video Music Awards | Best Collaboration | Nominated | |
| 2011 | MTV Video Music Awards | Best Hip-Hop Video | Nominated | |
| 2011 | Soul Train Music Awards | Song of the Year | Nominated | |
| 2011 | Soul Train Music Awards | Hip-Hop Song of the Year | Nominated | |
| 2011 | Teen Choice Awards | Choice Music: R&B/Hip-Hop Track | Nominated | |
| 2012 | ASCAP Rhythm & Soul Music Awards | Award Winning R&B/Hip-Hop Songs | Won | |
| 2012 | ASCAP Rhythm & Soul Music Awards | Award Winning Rap Songs | Won | |
| 2012 | MTV Video Play Awards | Gold | Won | |
| 2012 | BMI R&B/Hip-Hop Awards | Award Winning Songs | Won | |
| 2012 | 54th Annual Grammy Awards | Song of the Year | Nominated | |
| 2012 | 54th Annual Grammy Awards | Best Rap/Sung Collaboration | Won | |
| 2012 | 54th Annual Grammy Awards | Best Rap Song | Won | |
| 2012 | International Dance Music Awards | Best Rap/Hip Hop/Trap Dance Track | Nominated | |

== Credits and personnel ==
Credits for "All of the Lights" adapted from liner notes.

- Produced by Kanye West
- Co-produced by Jeff Bhasker
- Recorded by Andrew Dawson, Anthony Kilhoffer, and Mike Dean
- Mixed by Anthony Kilhoffer
- Assistant engineers: Christian Mochizuki, Pete Bischoff, Koby Hass and Phil Joly
- Keyboards: Jeff Bhasker and Mike Dean
- Piano: Elton John
- Brass and woodwinds: Danny Flam, Tony Gorruso, and Ken Lewis
- Horn arrangements: Ken Lewis
- Engineered by Brent Kolatalo
- Orchestral arranger and conductor: Rosie Danvers
- Trumpets: Mike Lovatt, Simon Finch, Andy Gathercole
- French horns: Tim Anderson, Tom Rumsby, Richard Ashton
- Trombone: Mark Frost, Philip Judge
- Flute: Chloe Vincent
- Violins: Kotono Sato, Jenny Sacha
- Viola: Rachel Robson
- Cello: Rosie Danvers, Chris "Hitchcock" Chorney
- Cello arrangement: Mike Dean
- Additional vocals: Rihanna, Kid Cudi, Tony Williams, The-Dream, Charlie Wilson, John Legend, Elly Jackson, Alicia Keys, Elton John, Fergie, Ryan Leslie, Drake, Alvin Fields, and Ken Lewis

== Charts ==
=== Weekly charts ===
Weekly chart performance
| Chart (2010–2011) | Peak position |
|---|---|
| Australia (ARIA) | 24 |
| Australia (ARIA Urban Singles) | 8 |
| Austria (Ö3 Austria Top 40) | 68 |
| Belgium (Ultratop 50 Flanders) | 27 |
| Belgium (Ultratip Bubbling Under Wallonia) | 3 |
| Canada Hot 100 (Billboard) | 53 |
| France (SNEP) | 52 |
| Germany Urban Charts | 17 |
| Ireland (IRMA) | 13 |
| New Zealand (Recorded Music NZ) | 13 |
| Scottish Singles Sales (Official Charts) | 14 |
| South Korea (Circle) | 50 |
| Switzerland (Schweizer Hitparade) | 46 |
| UK Singles (Official Charts) | 15 |
| UK Hip Hop/R&B (Official Charts) | 5 |
| US Billboard Hot 100 | 18 |
| US Hot R&B/Hip-Hop Songs (Billboard) | 2 |
| US Hot Rap Songs (Billboard) | 2 |
| US Pop Airplay (Billboard) | 38 |
| US Rhythmic Airplay (Billboard) | 5 |

=== Year-end charts ===
Year-end chart performance
| Chart (2011) | Position |
|---|---|
| Australia (ARIA) | 99 |
| Australia Urban (ARIA) | 38 |
| UK Singles Chart (OCC) | 87 |
| US Billboard Hot 100 | 59 |
| US Hot R&B/Hip-Hop Songs (Billboard) | 12 |
| US Rhythmic (Billboard) | 25 |

== Certifications ==
Certifications
| Region | Certification | Certified units/sales |
|---|---|---|
| Australia (ARIA) | 2× Platinum | 140,000^{^} |
| Brazil (Pro-Música Brasil) | Gold | 30,000^{‡} |
| Denmark (IFPI Danmark) | Platinum | 90,000^{‡} |
| Germany (BVMI) | Gold | 150,000^{‡} |
| Italy (FIMI) | Gold | 50,000^{‡} |
| New Zealand (RMNZ) | 4× Platinum | 120,000^{‡} |
| United Kingdom (BPI) | 3× Platinum | 1,800,000^{‡} |
| United States (RIAA) | 8× Platinum | 8,000,000^{‡} |
| United States (RIAA) Interlude | Gold | 500,000^{‡} |
Streaming
| Denmark (IFPI Danmark) Streaming | Gold | 900,000^{†} |
^{^} Shipments figures based on certification alone.^{‡} Sales+streaming figures based on certification alone.^{†} Streaming-only figures based on certification alone.

== Release history ==
Release history
| Region | Date | Formats | Labels | Ref. |
|---|---|---|---|---|
| Australia | December 13, 2010 | Alternative radio; contemporary hit radio | Def Jam; Universal | |
| United States | January 18, 2011 | Contemporary hit radio; rhythmic contemporary radio | Def Jam; Roc-A-Fella | |
