= Deep Web Technologies =

Deep Web Technologies, Inc.
- Type: Private
- Industry: Computer software
- Founded: 2002
- Headquarters: Santa Fe, NM
- Key people: Abe Lederman (President and CEO)
- Products: Explorit Research Accelerator
- Number of employees: 15 (2007)
- Website: deepwebtech.com

Deep Web Technologies is a software company that specializes in mining the Deep Web — the part of the Internet that is not directly searchable through ordinary web search engines. The company produces a proprietary software platform "Explorit" for searches. It also produces the federated search engine ScienceResearch.com, which provides free federated public searching of a large number of databases, and is also produced in specialized versions, Biznar for business research, Mednar for medical research, and customized versions for individual clients.

In January 2020, Deep Web Technologies were acquired by UK technology company AMPLYFI Ltd. AMPLYFI Ltd were established in 2015 and provide business intelligence solutions to global corporations through artificial intelligence based software. AMPLYFI Ltd's CEO is Chris Ganje, and has offices in London and Cardiff.
