= The Monster Tour (Eminem and Rihanna) =

2014 concert tour by Eminem and Rihanna

- Promotional tour by Eminem and Rihanna
- Promotional poster for the tour
- Location: U.S., North America
- Associated album: The Marshall Mathers LP 2; Unapologetic
- Start date: August 7, 2014
- End date: August 23, 2014
- No. of shows: 6
- Box office: $36 million ($48.96 million in 2025 dollars)
Eminem tour chronology
Rapture Tour (2014)	The Monster Tour (2014)	Revival Tour (2018)
Rihanna tour chronology
Diamonds World Tour (2013)	The Monster Tour (2014)	Anti World Tour (2016)

The Monster Tour was a co-headlining concert tour by American rapper Eminem and Barbadian singer Rihanna. The tour began on August 7, 2014, at the Rose Bowl in Pasadena and concluded on August 23, 2014, at the Comerica Park in Detroit.

== Background ==
Eminem and Rihanna first collaborated in 2010 with "Love the Way You Lie". Since then they have released three more collaborations: "Love the Way You Lie (Part II)" (2010), "Numb" (2012), and "The Monster" (2013).

In February 2014, it was announced that they would embark on a mini-tour. On March 19, 2014, it was confirmed that it would be called The Monster Tour and three dates were announced. Tickets went on sale to the general public on March 28, 2014. On March 21, 2014, three further dates were added to the tour due to popular demand.

== Commercial performance ==
The Monster Tour was one of the highest-grossing tours of 2014 in North America, with a gross of $36 million in only six shows. A total of 581,276 people attended (including outside the stadiums).

The two shows at MetLife Stadium in New Jersey grossed $12.4 million with 101,941 people attending each concert. It was the sixth highest-grossing box office of the year in North America, only behind Billy Joel, George Strait, One Direction and Garth Brooks.

== Set list ==
The following set list is taken from the concert held on August 7, 2014; at the Rose Bowl in Pasadena, California.

=== Act 1: Eminem & Rihanna ===
1. "Numb"
2. "No Love"
3. "Run This Town" / "Renegade" / "Live Your Life"
4. "Crack a Bottle"
5. "Won't Back Down"

=== Act 2: Rihanna ===
1. "What Now"
2. "Phresh Out the Runway"
3. "Birthday Cake" / "Talk That Talk"
4. "Rude Boy"
5. "What's My Name?" (contains elements of "Na Na")
6. "Pour It Up" (contains elements of "Forgot About Dre")
7. "Cockiness (Love It)"
8. "Man Down"
9. "You da One"
10. "Wait Your Turn"
11. "Jump"
12. "Umbrella"
13. "All of the Lights" / "Rockstar 101"
14. ”Only Girl (In The World)”
15. "Where Have You Been"
16. "Stay"

=== Act 3: Eminem ===
1. "Love the Way You Lie" (with Rihanna)
2. "3 A.M."
3. "Square Dance"
4. "Business" / "Kill You"
5. "Evil Deeds"
6. "Rap God"
7. "Marshall Mathers"
8. "Just Don't Give a Fuck"
9. "Still Don't Give a Fuck" / "Criminal" / "The Way I Am"
10. "Airplanes, Part II" (with Rihanna)
11. "Stan" (with Rihanna)
12. "Sing For The Moment"
13. "Like Toy Soldiers" / "Forever" / "Berzerk"
14. "Till I Collapse"
15. "Cinderella Man"
16. "My Name Is"
17. "The Real Slim Shady"
18. "Without Me" / "Not Afraid"

=== Act 4: Rihanna & Eminem ===
1. "Diamonds"
2. "We Found Love"
3. "Lose Yourself"
4. "The Monster"

== Shows ==
List of 2014 concerts showing date, city, country, venue, tickets sold, number of available tickets
Date (2014)	City	Country	Venue	Attendance	Revenue
August 7	Pasadena	United States	Rose Bowl	110,346 / 110,346	$13,148,346
August 8	Pasadena	United States	Rose Bowl	110,346 / 110,346	$13,148,346
August 16	East Rutherford	United States	MetLife Stadium	101,941 / 101,941	$12,721,417
August 17	East Rutherford	United States	MetLife Stadium	101,941 / 101,941	$12,721,417
August 22	Detroit	United States	Comerica Park	105,092 / 105,092	$10,598,888
August 23	Detroit	United States	Comerica Park	105,092 / 105,092	$10,598,888
Total				317,379 / 317,379 (100)	$36,468,651
