= Watch n' Learn =

Song by Rihanna

from the album Talk That Talk
- Recorded: 2011
- Studio: Roc the Mic Studios (New York City); Sofitel Paris Le Faubourg, Room 508 (Paris)
- Genre: Dancehall; soca
- Length: 3:31
- Label: Def Jam; SRP
- Songwriters: Robyn Fenty; Priscilla Renea; Chauncey Hollis; Alja Jackson
- Producers: Hit-Boy; Kuk Harrell

"Watch n' Learn" is a song recorded by Barbadian singer Rihanna, for her sixth studio album Talk That Talk (2011). It was written by Priscilla Renea, Chauncey Hollis, Rihanna and Alja Jackson. The production was done by Hollis under his stage-name Hit-Boy. When Renea came with an idea and concept for the song, Hollis had already started working on the composition, without having in mind any particular artist. With the work on the track being finished, it was forwarded to Rihanna and her label, which eagerly accepted it.

"Watch n' Learn" is a dancehall song with prominent reggae characteristics. The song's instrumentation uses finger-snapping, percussions, background clicks, synths and "island-flavored" drum beat. Lyrically, it is about a woman who teaches her partner how to love her in the right way, throughout which she uses sexual references. "Watch n' Learn" received predominantly positive reviews from music critics, with many of them praising its composition and sound. Upon the release of Talk That Talk, the song debuted at number 80 on the singles chart in South Korea.

== Background and development ==
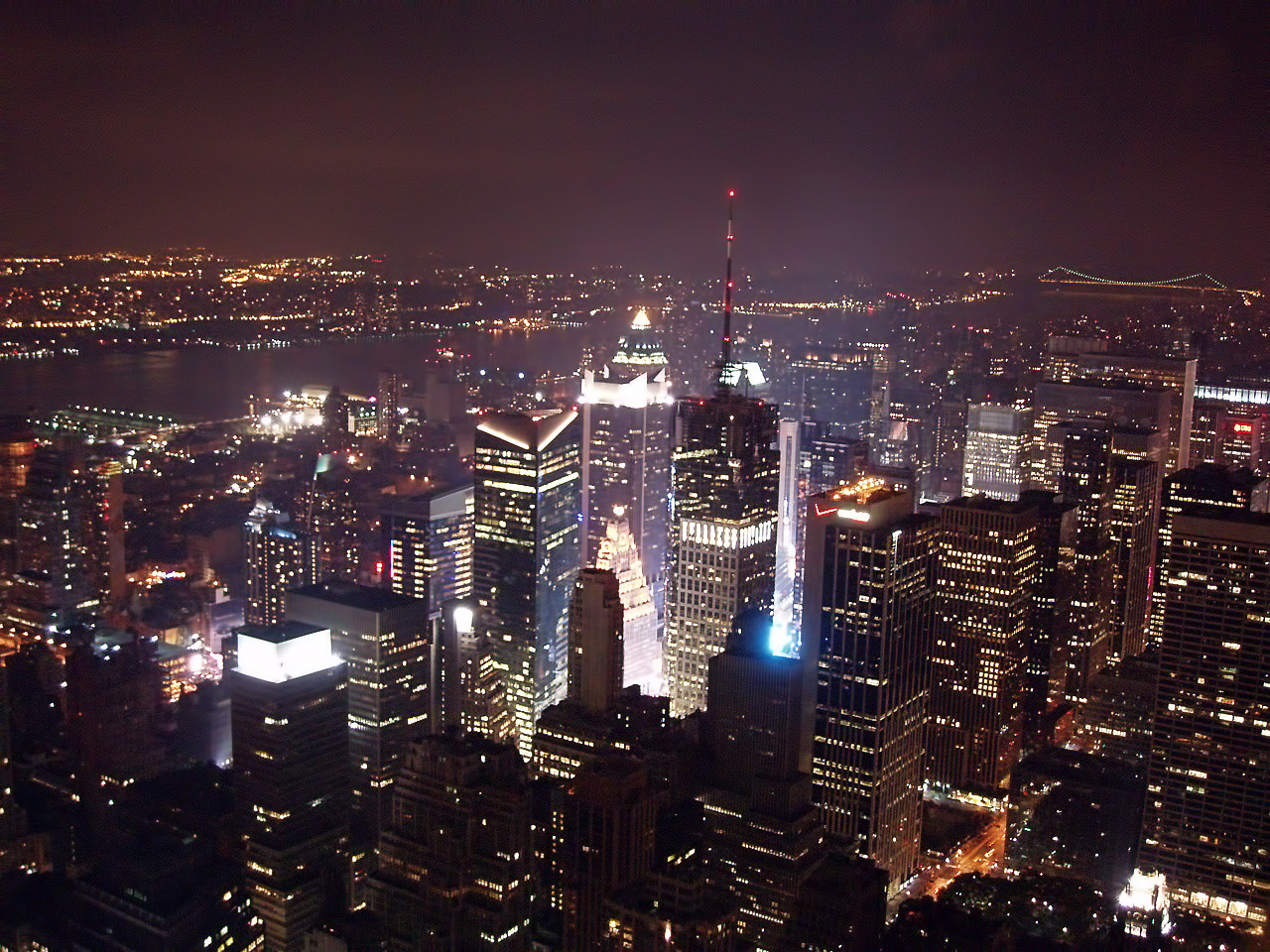
One of the recording locations of the song were Roc the Mic Studios in New York City (pictured).

"Watch n' Learn" was written by Priscilla Renea, Chauncey Hollis, Rihanna and Alja Jackson. The production of the song was helmed by Hollis under his stage-name Hit-Boy. Hollis had previously worked with music artists like Lil Wayne, The Throne, Eminem and Jennifer Lopez. "Watch n' Learn" wasn't originally meant for any particular artist when Hit-Boy started to work on it. In an interview with Jocelyn Vena from MTV News he explained: "I was at the studio with this amazing [songwriter] Priscilla Renea, and I was going to tell her to go home, but I was like, 'Stay here and see if you could come up with an idea for this [the song]'". Renea previously penned Rihanna's 2011 single "California King Bed" (Loud, 2010). Hollis further explained that by the time he left the studio and came home, Renea already sent him the idea and concept for the song through iChat. He was eventually satisfied with it and sent the song to Rihanna, in which her team "went crazy" when they heard it. Rihanna then recorded the song for inclusion on her sixth studio album Talk That Talk (2011).

In the same interview for the publication, Hollis explained the title of the song: "It's called 'Watch n' Learn,' and people will understand what it's about once it comes out. It's a very sexy record, but it's fun. It's [got] great melodies; it's catchy; the beat knocks. It's so many different elements to it." When asked how is he satisfied with Rihanna's vocals and his prediction on the song he further stated: "She definitely murdered it vocally. I was just at the studio last week listening to a mix of it, and man, she killed it. I really feel like, this song, it's going to be big. I'm really excited about it." "Watch n' Learn" was recorded at Roc the Mic Studios in New York City and at Sofitel Paris Le Faubourg in Paris. The song was mixed by Marcos Tovar. Its vocal production was completed by Kuk Harrell and assisted by TT. and Jennifer Rosales.

== Composition ==
"Watch n' Learn"
A sample of "Watch n' Learn" which uses finger-snapping, percussions, background clicks, "swirling/swelling" synths and "island-flavored" drum beat.

"Watch n' Learn" is a dancehall song with prominent reggae characteristics that runs for 3 minutes and 31 seconds. It begins with a reggae drum fill that according to Melissa Maerz of Entertainment Weekly originates from Bob Marley's 1983 single "Buffalo Soldier" (Confrontation, 1983). "Watch n' Learn" uses finger-snapping, percussions, background clicks, "swirling/swelling" synths and "island-flavored" drum beat.

Jason Lipshutz of Billboard complimented the balance between the synths and percussion while calling it "taut and engaging". Flavour Magazine's Maz Halima thought that the beat sounds futuristic and reminds her of a new version of an old beat that was predominantly used in the songs performed by rapper Kanye West. Edward Keeble from Gigwise wrote that "Watch n' Learn" cares influence from the works by American hip hop and R&B band TLC, as well as sounds like a "call back to the" synthpop group Art of Noise.

Lyrically, the song is about a woman who teaches her partner how to love her in the right way, throughout which she uses sexual references. MTV News' Jocelyn Vena concluded that song has "sassy" lyrics, but its melody is soft enough and makes you forget that "the track is actually kind of dirty". Chris Coplan of Consequence of Sound stated that during the interpretation of the lyrics, Rihanna is proud and sexual and her confidence comes from elsewhere. Rihanna reveals her sex fantasies through singing the lyrics: "I'mma do it do it do it/On the bed on the floor on the couch/Only cause your lips say make it to my mouth/Just because I can't kiss back/Doesn't mean you can't kiss that", which were described as the "nastiest" on the song by Brad Wete of Complex. As the song continues further, Rihanna is "not-so-subtly" instructing her lover within the lines "It’s your turn now / Watch and learn now / Watch and learn how / If you learn how / I'll stay".

== Critical reception ==
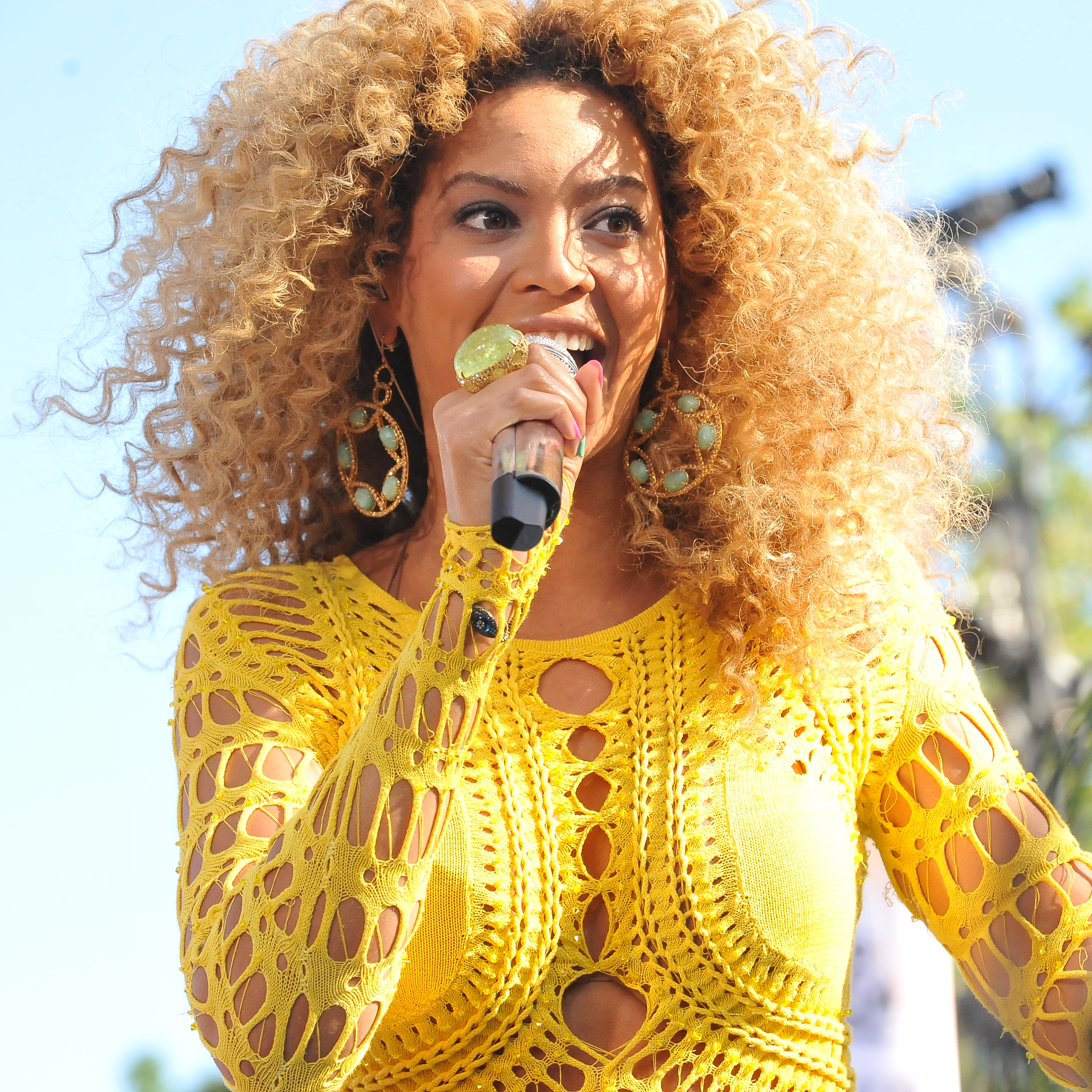
Jon Caramanica from The New York Times linked "Watch n' Learn" to Beyoncé's 2011 single "Party".

Chris Coplan of Consequence of Sound called "Watch n' Learn" a "reggae jam" and further concluded that "low-key Rihanna, without heaps of easily identifiable help or loads of over-saturated gimmicks, is still a knockout". Matthew Horton of Virgin Media called the song a "wonderfully sunny tribal disco" track with a thematics regarding oral sex. In a review of Talk That Talk, Mesfin Fekadu of The Boston Globe stated that Rihanna is "raunchy" on the new album and it works. Regarding the song he further commented that she's [Rihanna] schooling her man in the bedroom on the fun "Watch N' Learn.". Giovanny Caquais of CultureBlues concluded that the track "strips away" from the techno and David Guetta influences which according to him the album is "drowning in". He further thought that "sassy women will absolutely love to sing [the song] in their cars." Maz Hallima of Flavour Magazine positively reviewed "Watch n' Learn", considering her favorite song from the album together with "Cockiness (Love It)" and "You da One". Hallima thought that the song has Rihanna's signature sound and wrote she "really enjoyed the contrast between the light beat and her husky voice – pure catchiness."

Glenn Gamboa of Newsweek considered "Watch n' Learn" an "answer to Janet Jackson's "Doesn't Really Matter" for its similar production and "playful" nature. Los Angeles Times’ Randal Roberts while reviewing the song stated: Rihanna "reels off her carnal intentions with an impressive though not entirely believable candor." Julianne Shepherd of Spin called the track Rihanna's game in which there is a very little chance for winning — "but she'd love it if you tried". Andy Kellman of Allmusic commended the melody of the song and noted that "Watch n' Learn" is more unique than Hit-Boy's work on Kanye West and Jay-Z's 2011 single "Niggas in Paris" (Watch the Throne, 2011). Chelsea Lewis from The Celebrity Cafe concluded that Rihanna "is expressing her independence as a woman in the music industry, as she is making a statement with 'Watch n’ Learn' and Talk That Talk as a whole." Herald Sun's Cameron Adams while comparing the song with the other sexual themes on the album, stated that "Watch n' Learn" is "at least instructional". Jon Caramanica from The New York Times linked "Watch N' Learn" to Beyoncé Knowles' "Party", however he concluded that even though it has "good mouth feel but no taste".

== Credits and personnel ==
Recording

- Recorded at Roc the Mic Studios, New York City, New York; Sofitel Paris Le Faubourg, Room 538, Paris, France

Personnel

- Songwriting – Priscilla Renea, Chauncey Hollis, Robyn Fenty, Alja Jackson.
- Production – Hit-Boy
- Vocal production – Kuk Harrell
- Vocal recording – Kuk Harrell, Marcos Tovar
- Vocal assistant – TT., Jennifer Rosales
- Mixing – Marcos Tovar

Credits adapted from the liner notes of Talk That Talk, Def Jam Recordings, SRP Records.

== Charts ==
Upon the release of Talk That Talk, due to digital downloads "Watch n' Learn" charted in lower regions on the singles chart in South Korea. It debuted on the South Korea Gaon International Chart at number 80 on November 26, 2011, with sales of 6,049 digital copies.

Chart (2011)	Peak position
South Korea (Gaon Chart)	80
