= Talk That Talk (Rihanna song) =

2012 single by Rihanna

Single by Rihanna featuring Jay-Z

from the album Talk That Talk
- Released: January 17, 2012
- Recorded: 2011
- Studio: Roc the Mic Studios, Jungle City Studios (New York City); Westlake Recording Studios (Los Angeles); The Hide Out Studios (London)
- Genre: Hip-hop; R&B
- Length: 3:29
- Label: Def Jam; SRP
- Songwriters: Ester Dean; Mikkel S. Eriksen; Tor Erik Hermansen; Shawn Carter; Anthony Best; Sean Combs; Chucky Thompson; Christopher Wallace
- Producers: Stargate; Kuk Harrell

Rihanna singles chronology
"You da One" (2011)	"Talk That Talk" (2012)	"Take Care" (2012)

Jay-Z singles chronology
"Glory" (2012)	"Talk That Talk" (2012)	"No Church in the Wild" (2012)

"Talk That Talk" is a song by the Barbadian singer Rihanna from her sixth studio album of the same name. It features a rap verse by American rapper Jay-Z, who had previously collaborated with Rihanna on her song "Umbrella" in 2007 and "Run This Town" in 2009. The song was written by Jay-Z, Ester Dean, together with the Norwegian production duo Stargate. Def Jam Recordings serviced the track to urban contemporary radio in the United States on January 17, 2012, as the third single from Talk That Talk. It was released in France as a CD single on March 26. "Talk That Talk" is a hip hop song with R&B beats, rough drums, and unrefined synths, and has a similar style to Rihanna's 2010 single "Rude Boy". It contains a sample of "I Got a Story to Tell" by the Notorious B.I.G. Therefore, the Buckwild, Sean Combs, Chucky Thompson, and the Notorious B.I.G. are credited as songwriters.

"Talk That Talk" was nominated for a Grammy Award for Best Rap/Sung Collaboration at the 2013 ceremony. The song appeared on several charts worldwide; it reached number 31 on the US Billboard Hot 100, number 25 on the UK Singles Chart, and the Top 10 in Israel and Norway. It was certified double Platinum by the Recording Industry Association of America (RIAA), denoting digital downloads of over two million copies in the US. Rihanna performed "Talk That Talk" on television shows such as The Jonathan Ross Show and Saturday Night Live and included it on the set lists of the 2013 Diamonds and the 2014 The Monster Tour with Eminem.

== Background ==
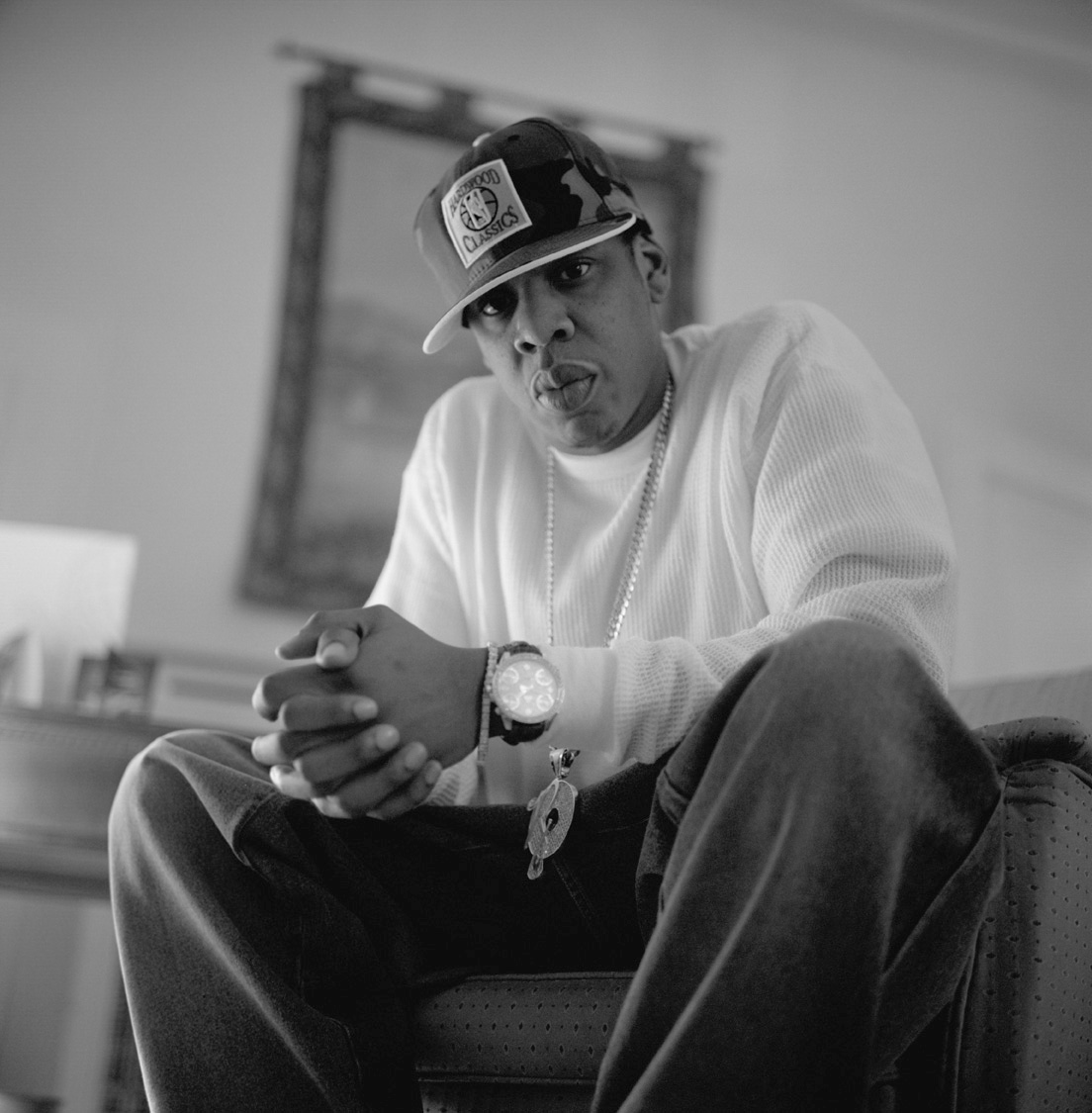
"Talk That Talk" features rapper Jay-Z, who also co-wrote the song.

Before her sixth studio album Talk That Talk was released in November 2011, Rihanna announced on her Twitter account that, apart from the song "We Found Love" with Calvin Harris, the album would have only one other featured artist, although she did not mention the artist's name. Jay Brown, Rihanna's manager, explained that they preferred to record independently rather than collaborate with other artists. On November 8, Rihanna confirmed on Twitter that her mentor, American rapper Jay-Z, would appear as a featured artist on the album's title track. Brown said that the collaboration "happened organically".

"Talk That Talk" is the third major collaboration between Rihanna and Jay-Z, who had worked together on "Umbrella" in 2007 and "Run This Town" in 2009. "Umbrella" was the lead single from Rihanna's 2007 album Good Girl Gone Bad and topped the charts in more than ten countries, including the US Billboard Hot 100, on which it spent seven consecutive weeks at number 1. "Run This Town", which also featured rapper Kanye West, was released as the second single from Jay-Z's 2009 album The Blueprint 3.

== Production and release ==
"Talk That Talk" was written by Ester Dean, Jay-Z, Stargate, Anthony Best, Sean Combs, and Chucky Thompson, and produced by Stargate. They had produced Rihanna's 2010 hit singles "Only Girl (In the World)" and "What's My Name?" for her fifth album Loud. Stargate told Norwegian website 730.no that it was their first collaboration with Jay-Z and said that they were very satisfied with both the song and each artist's contribution. "Talk That Talk" was recorded at Roc the Mic Studios and The Jungle City Studios in New York City, Westlake Recording Studios in Los Angeles, and The Hide Out Studios in London. Stargate, Miles Walker, and Mike Anderson served as the song's recording engineers. Rihanna's vocals were recorded by Marcos Tovar and Kuk Harrell, who additionally produced them, while Jordan "DJ Swivel" Young recorded Jay-Z's verses. Additional recording of the song was done in Sofitel Paris Le Faubourg and Savoy London hotels. "Talk That Talk" was mixed by Phil Tan and assistant Daniela Rivera at Ninja Beat Club Studios in Atlanta. Eriksen and Hermansen recorded the song's instrumentation, and Tim Blacksmith and Danny D. were assigned as its executive producers.

In December 2011, Rihanna asked her fans on Twitter to recommend a song from Talk That Talk for release as the third single. On January 10, 2012, she announced that the title track was chosen and also debuted the single's cover—a black-and-white image in which Rihanna is dressed in "street punk/rockabilly clothes" and crouches against a wall. According to Jazmine Gray of Vibe magazine, the singer has an ambiguous facial expression on the cover. On January 17, Def Jam Recordings serviced "Talk That Talk" to urban contemporary radio stations in the United States. It was also sent to US contemporary hit and rhythmic radios on February 14. On March 26, "Talk That Talk" was released in France as a CD single, which contained the album version of the song and the Chuckie Extended Remix of "We Found Love".

== Composition and lyrical interpretation ==
"Talk That Talk"
A sample of "Talk That Talk", a hip hop song with a pop hook that features R&B beats, rough drums, and unrefined synths.

"Talk That Talk" has a length of three minutes and twenty-nine seconds. Time magazine's Claire Suddath characterized it as a lively hip hop track with a pop hook. It features R&B beats, "hard drums", unrefined synths, and a brief sample of the song "I Got a Story to Tell" by rapper The Notorious B.I.G., which can be found at 0:44.

Sam Lansky of MTV Buzzworthy found it sensual and confident, and observed that Rihanna counts when she sings the song's chorus. IGN's Chad Grischow wrote that a "fuzzy synth melody" interjects Rihanna's "sexy plea for pillow talk", which is complemented by "bling-loving rap from Jay-Z." Digital Spy's Robert Copsey felt that its riff is similar to Rihanna's 2010 single "Rude Boy".

The song begins with a rap verse performed by Jay-Z, whose lines include: "I talk big money, I talk big homes / I sell out arenas, I call that getting dome / Million dollar voice, came through phone / We heading to the top, if you coming, come on". He raps at a slow pace and incorporates both double entendres and humorous remarks, including a sexual reference that Claire Suddath viewed, was an indication of Jay-Z's enjoyment on the song: "[I] had it by her bladder, she's like 'Oh I gotta pee!'." Melissa Maerz from Entertainment Weekly remarked that he "even touts their jet-set lifestyle on the title track, bragging that he can fly out to Pisa / Just to get some pizza."

== Critical reception ==
Daily Mirror critic Gavin Martin commented that the song has Rihanna "stealing not just Beyoncé's bootylicious crown but also her husband Jay-Z for a frisky exchange against sibilant drum cracks." Sputnikmusic's Steve M. felt that it could be a major hit on radio partly because of Jay-Z's guest rap. Reem Buhazza of The National similarly felt that "Talk That Talk", along with "You da One" and "Roc Me Out", is part of "the winning combination of made-for-radio pop sensibility". David Griffiths from 4Music found the song to be compelling and viewed it as another successful collaboration between Rihanna and Jay-Z. Lansky from MTV Buzzworthy was not surprised that another collaboration between the two was a success. MTV News' Jocelyn Vena called it "big and hard with just enough brightness" and felt that the song discusses sexual intercourse more appropriately than "Cockiness (Love It)"; in the latter, Rihanna expresses her desire to have sex while singing the lyrics "Suck my cockiness, lick my persuasion".

Lewis Corner of Digital Spy gave the song four out of five stars and called it an enticing, anthemic club song. In a review of Talk That Talk, Pitchfork's Lindsay Zoladz wrote that it is one of the album's more lighthearted songs, even though it is not as good as "Umbrella". Consequence of Sound's Chris Coplan found Jay-Z's rap unenthusiastic, but said that Rihanna is as emotional and invested in her singing as she was on Saturday Night Live. People magazine's Chuck Arnold called the song "another moment in the sun." Julianne Escobedo Shepherd of Spin thought that it is a collaboration that "does not go unnoticed". On the critical side, Priya Elan of NME wrote that the song is a "gamble that doesn't pay off". The single was nominated for Best Rap/Sung Collaboration at the 55th Annual Grammy Awards. but lost to "No Church in the Wild" (2012) by Jay-Z and Kanye West featuring Frank Ocean and The-Dream.

== Commercial performance ==
After the release of the album, the song charted in many countries owing to strong digital sales. It debuted and peaked at number 31 on the US Billboard Hot 100 and sold 73,000 digital copies, which was the highest debut on the chart for that week. In the week of January 28, 2012, "Talk That Talk" re-entered the chart at number 100. It reached number 36 in the week of March 24. The song also appeared on the Hot R&B/Hip-Hop Songs chart at number 63 in the issue dated January 28. It peaked of number 12 and stayed on the chart for twenty-one weeks. It was ranked number 73 on the Billboard's year-end R&B/Hip-Hop Songs chart. On the Mainstream Top 40 chart, the single debuted and peaked at number 26 in the week of April 7. It was certified double Platinum by the Recording Industry Association of America (RIAA), denoting digital downloads of 2 million copies in the United States. "Talk That Talk" debuted and peaked at number 30 on the Canadian Hot 100 chart.

In Europe, after the release of the album, the song appeared on ten national charts. It debuted at number 25 on the UK Singles Chart, and reached number 7 on the UK Hip Hop and R&B Singles Chart. The song made a Top 10 debut on the Norwegian Singles Chart and charted at number 11 on the Swiss Singles Chart. It also made Top 40 appearances in the Republic of Ireland, New Zealand, and Spain, and also charted highly in Scotland, France, and Denmark. After its release as a single, "Talk That Talk" entered the Australian Singles Chart at number 42 and peaked at number 28 on February 19. It was certified Platinum by the Australian Recording Industry Association (ARIA) for selling 70,000 digital copies. It peaked at number 172 on the Circle Digital Chart in South Korea.

== Live performances ==
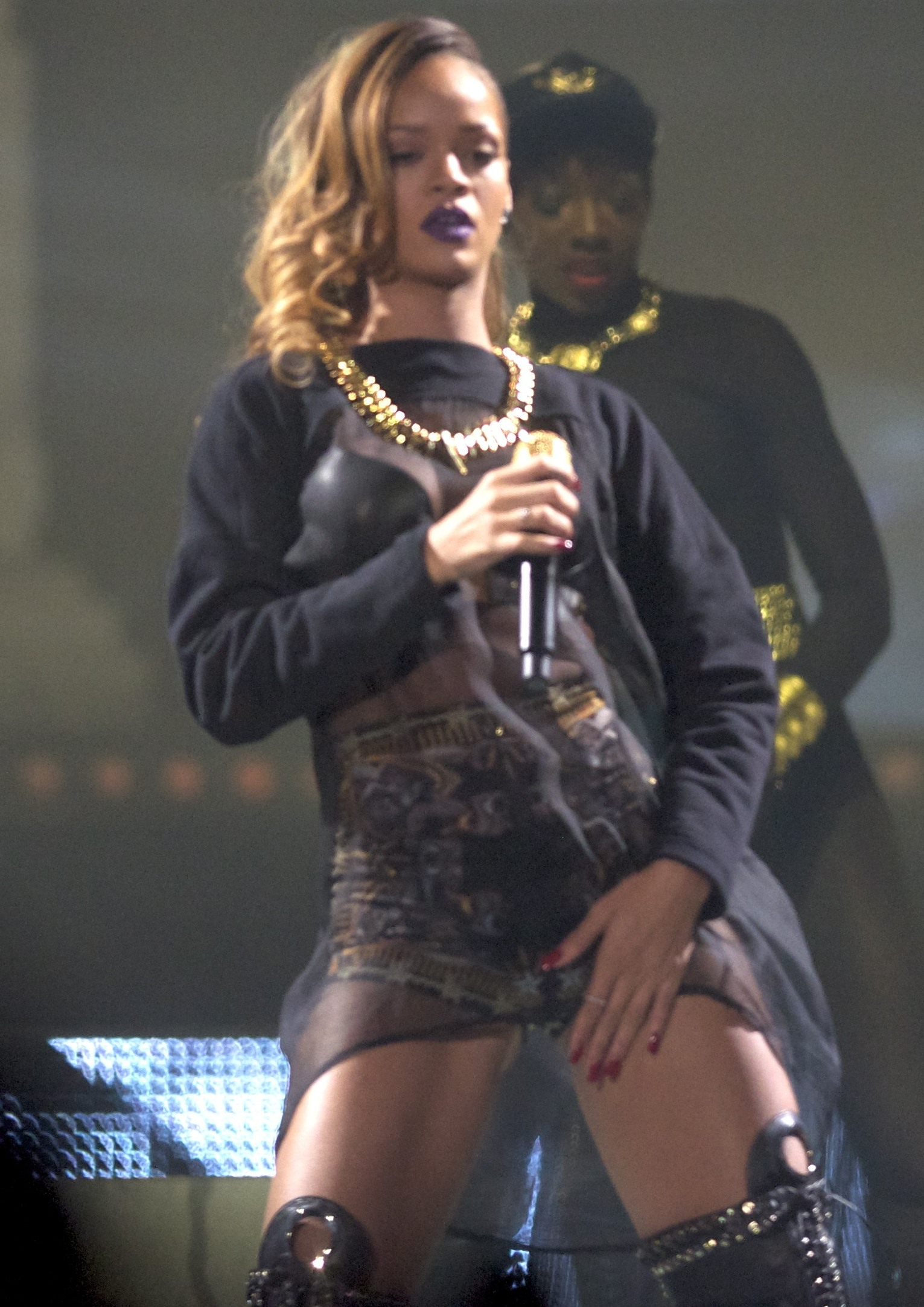
Rihanna performing "Talk That Talk" on the Diamonds World Tour (2013)

Rihanna first performed "Talk That Talk" on the British talk show The Jonathan Ross Show, which aired on March 3, 2012. She performed without Jay-Z and was also interviewed. On May 5, Rihanna performed the song on the American comedy show Saturday Night Live as part of a medley that included the original interlude version of "Birthday Cake". In her performance, she wore an all-black outfit with a giant spider web as her backdrop. She sang a short section of "Birthday Cake", which transitioned into "Talk That Talk", of which the latter was performed in its entirety. Rihanna and Jay-Z performed "Talk That Talk" together at the 2012 BBC Radio 1's Hackney Weekend in London. The performance also featured their previous collaborations "Run This Town" and "Umbrella". In November, she performed the song on the set list of her 777 Tour, a seven-day long promotional tour that supported the release of her 2012 album Unapologetic. "Talk That Talk" was also included on the set list of her 2013 Diamonds World Tour. Rihanna performed the song on her joint tour with rapper Eminem, titled The Monster Tour in 2014.

== Track listing ==
- CD
1. "Talk That Talk" (featuring Jay-Z)
2. "We Found Love" (Chuckie extended remix)

== Credits and personnel ==
Credits are adapted from the liner notes of Talk That Talk.

Locations

- Recorded at Roc the Mic Studios and The Jungle City Studios, New York City; Westlake Recording Studios, Los Angeles, CA; The Hide Out Studios, London
- Mixed at Ninja Club Studios, Atlanta, GA

Personnel

- Songwriting – Ester Dean, Mikkel S. Eriksen, Tor Erik Hermansen, Shawn Carter, Anthony Best, Sean Combs, Chucky Thompson, Christopher Wallace
- Production – Stargate
- Recording – Mikkel S. Eriksen, Miles Walker, Mike Anderson
- Vocal Production – Kuk Harrell
- Vocal Recording – Kuk Harrell, Marcos Tovar, Jordan "DJ" Swivel Young
- Mixing – Phil Tan
- Mixing assistant – Daniela Rivera
- Instrumentation – Mikkel S. Eriksen, Tor Erik Hermansen
- Executive producers – Tim Blacksmith, Danny D.

== Charts ==
=== Weekly charts ===
Weekly chart performance
Chart (2011–2012)	Peak position
Australia (ARIA)	28
Australia Urban (ARIA)	12
Belgium (Ultratip Bubbling Under Flanders)	4
Belgium (Ultratip Bubbling Under Wallonia)	2
Canada Hot 100 (Billboard)	30
Denmark (Tracklisten)	26
France (SNEP)	24
Greece Airplay (Billboard)	63
Ireland (IRMA)	22
Israel (Media Forest)	4
Japan Hot 100 (Billboard)	96
Netherlands (Dutch Top 40)	29
Netherlands (Single Top 100)	61
New Zealand (Recorded Music NZ)	37
Norway (VG-lista)	10
Scottish Singles Sales (Official Charts)	24
Slovakia Airplay (ČNS IFPI)	38
South Korea (Circle)	172
Spain (Promusicae)	37
Sweden (Sverigetopplistan)	41
Switzerland (Schweizer Hitparade)	11
UK Hip Hop/R&B (Official Charts)	7
UK Singles (Official Charts)	25
US Billboard Hot 100	31
US Hot R&B/Hip-Hop Songs (Billboard)	12
US Pop Airplay (Billboard)	26
US Rhythmic Airplay (Billboard)	3

=== Year-end charts ===
Year-end chart performance
Chart (2012)	Position
France (SNEP)	147
UK Singles (OCC)	185
US Hot R&B/Hip-Hop Songs (Billboard)	73
US Rhythmic (Billboard)	34

== Certifications ==
Certifications
Region	Certification	Certified units/sales
Australia (ARIA)	Gold	35,000^{^}
Brazil (Pro-Música Brasil)	Gold	30,000^{‡}
Denmark (IFPI Danmark)	Gold	45,000^{‡}
New Zealand (RMNZ)	Platinum	30,000^{‡}
Sweden (GLF)	Gold	20,000^{‡}
United Kingdom (BPI)	Gold	400,000^{‡}
United States (RIAA)	2× Platinum	2,000,000^{‡}
^{^} Shipments figures based on certification alone.^{‡} Sales+streaming figures based on certification alone.

== Release history ==
Release history
Region	Date	Format(s)	Label	Ref.
United States	January 17, 2012	Urban contemporary radio	Def Jam	
United States	February 14, 2012	Contemporary hit radio; rhythmic contemporary radio	Def Jam	
France	March 26, 2012	CD	Universal	
