= Birthday Cake (song) =

2011 song by Rihanna

Song by Rihanna

from the album Talk That Talk
- Released: November 11, 2011
- Recorded: October 2011
- Studio: Radisson Blu Royal Hotel, Room 1306, Copenhagen, Denmark
- Genre: R&B
- Length: 1:18 (Interlude); 3:39 (Full-length)
- Label: Def Jam; SRP
- Songwriters: Terius Nash; Robyn Fenty; Marcos Palacios; Ernest Clark
- Producers: Da Internz; Terius "The-Dream" Nash; Kuk Harrell

Rihanna singles chronology
"Princess of China" (2012)	"Birthday Cake" (2012)	"Where Have You Been" (2012)

Chris Brown singles chronology
"Turn Up the Music" (2012)	"Birthday Cake" (2012)	"Right by My Side" (2012)

"Birthday Cake" is a song by Barbadian singer Rihanna, from her sixth album, Talk That Talk (2011). After it leaked onto the Internet, fans expressed interest in the track being included on Talk That Talk, but it was later revealed that the 1:18 (one minute, 18 seconds) length that leaked was in fact the final cut and was not being considered for inclusion on the album. Due to a high level of fan interest, the song was included on the album as an interlude.

The full-length version, featuring singer and Rihanna's ex-boyfriend Chris Brown, premiered online on February 20, 2012, to coincide with Rihanna's 24th birthday. The song peaked at number 24 on the Billboard Hot 100. The lyrics to "Birthday Cake" express the desire to have spontaneous sex. Music critics were divided on "Birthday Cake", with the majority both praising and criticizing the song's sexual lyrical content. Several critics compared the song to the previous track on the album "Cockiness (Love It)", which also consists of sexually explicit lyrics. Upon the release of Talk That Talk, the song debuted on the lower regions of the singles charts in South Korea, the United Kingdom, and the United States. It was certified Double Platinum in the US.

== Background and development ==
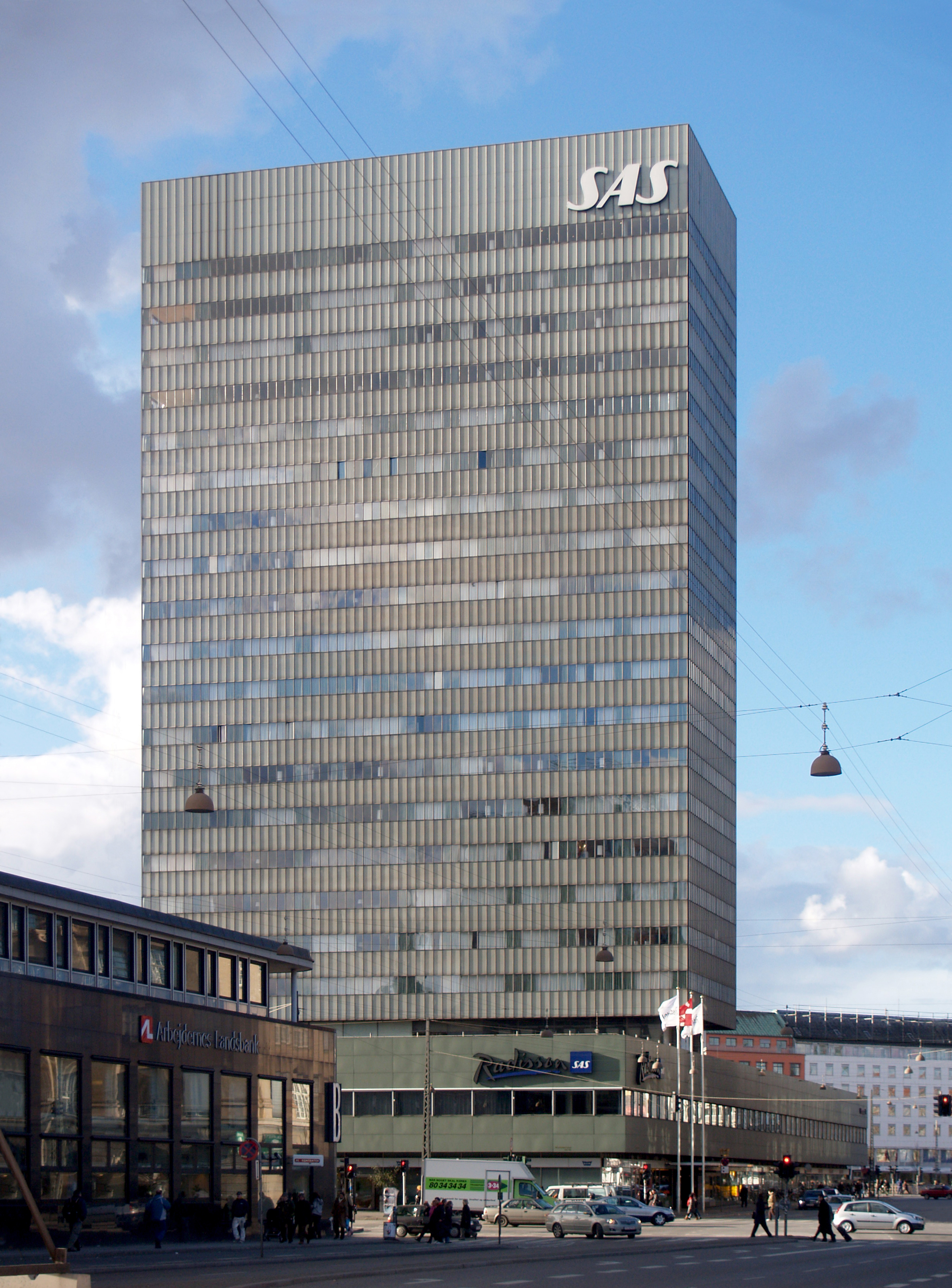
"Birthday Cake" was recorded in Room 1306 at the Radisson Blu Royal Hotel, Copenhagen in Denmark.

"Birthday Cake" was written by The-Dream, Rihanna, Marcos Palacios, and Earnest Clark, with production helmed by Da Internz and The-Dream. The interlude was recorded in room 1306 of the Radisson Blu Royal Hotel in Copenhagen, Denmark. In an interview for The Boom Box, producer The-Dream answered a question about fans being disappointed that "Birthday Cake" would not be featured on Talk That Talk (2011) after it leaked online before the album's November 2011 release; the producer explained that only an interlude had been produced, and that a full-length version of the song would be released at some point during the Talk That Talk era, saying:

I was just talking to Rihanna about that, because she [originally] made [just] an interlude. I was like, 'Your fans are going to be so mad at you.' As soon as I said that, I got back, and I guess she released a piece of it, and they saw how long it is. Man, they tore me up on Twitter! So I hit her on the phone. I was like, 'Yo, your fans, they're going crazy on me right now, like I could make you do something.' So 'Birthday Cake' is on there. It's going to turn into a whole song because the fans are ganging up on me, and I don't want to be murdered by the Rihanna Navy!.

Responding to requests from fans, Rihanna posted a message via her official Twitter account, promising that a full version of "Birthday Cake" was coming. Katherine St. Asaph of PopDust criticized the notion, writing "Honestly, at this point Rihanna and Def Jam would be better off just calling 'Birthday Cake' an interlude, not an incomplete version, because otherwise that's saying the album is released but essentially unfinished." Beck Bain of Idolator noted that the release of the full-length song is "doubtful", writing "the song is already too dirty in its current minute-and-twenty-second version. But if 'S&M' could be a single, is anything [sic] too risque for the radio these days?" On February 15, 2012, Kosine of Da Internz, who produced the interlude, claimed that the featured collaborator will "shock the world," and that the full-length version would premiere between February 16, and February 20, 2012.

On February 16, 2012, it was speculated that former boyfriend Chris Brown was the featured artist on the full-length version. Reports surfaced after the pair were photographed leaving Westlake Recording Studios in Los Angeles at separate times and Brown being invited to Rihanna's birthday party. Rumors were also fueled when Rihanna and Brown spent time together at the 2012 Grammy Awards on February 8, 2012. The reports gained worldwide media controversy, because Brown and Rihanna were involved in a physical altercation on the evening of the 2009 Grammy Awards. The full-length version, eventually revealed to feature Brown, was released on Rihanna's birthday, February 20, 2012. In an interview with Billboard, The-Dream stated that he believed Rihanna and Brown's past together should not be judged and that "Birthday Cake" is simply a song, saying, "For me, it's just music - two talented people doing a record together, doing two records together, and that's what it was. It wasn't about an incident that happened. The true thing really is to forgive, and you want to believe in people." "Birthday Cake" impacted US Urban contemporary radio on March 6, 2012, serving as the fourth U.S. single from Talk That Talk.

On March 15, 2012, Rihanna explained her collaboration with Brown on "Birthday Cake" and the remix of his song "Turn Up the Music" to Ryan Seacrest during his morning show: "The first song that came about was 'Birthday Cake'. I mean, we ended up recording them at the same time and executing them together. But I reached out to him about doing 'Birthday Cake' because that’s the only person that, really, it made sense to do the record. Just as a musician, despite everything else, that was going to be the person. You know I thought about rappers, and I've done that so many times, and the hottest R&B artist out right now is Chris Brown. So I wanted him on the track, and then in turn he was like, 'Why don't you do the remix to my track?' and it was a trade-off. We did two records. One for my fans, one for his fans, and that way our fans can come together. There shouldn’t be a divide. You know? It's music, and it's innocent." In March 2012, American rapper Fabolous released his own verse to the "Birthday Cake" remix. The following month, another version featuring Fabolous premiered online.

== Composition and lyrics ==
"Birthday Cake" is an R&B interlude which lasts for one minute and 18 seconds, appearing as the sixth track on the album. The instrumentation of "Birthday Cake" consists of a heavy bass, schoolbells, engine sounds, claps, and electro beats. It also samples the song "Dominator" by Human Resource. The track also consists of hoover synths, synth handclaps, an Eastern-inspired tone and chants. In the song, Rihanna adopts a sensual tone in her vocals, as she chants the song's provocative and sexually explicit lyrics. A reviewer for Flavour described the singer's vocal performance in "Birthday Cake" as "sultry". Nathan S. of DJ Booth concurred that Rihanna sounds "sultry" as well as "playful" on the song.

"Birthday Cake"
An eight second sample of "Birthday Cake". Rihanna can be heard chanting "cake" repetitively.

The lyrical content of the interlude is spare and largely revolves around Rihanna chanting, "cake cake cake cake cake cake." Aside from the repetitive chant of "cake", the interlude consists of multiple sexual metaphors. The lyric "I know you wanna bite this/ It's so enticing/ Nothing else like this, I'ma make you my bitch/ And it's not even my birthday/ But you wanna put your name on it" is a metaphor referring to a vagina. Rihanna sings about the desire to have spontaneous sex. Rihanna promises her lover that she will make him do whatever she pleases, singing "I'mma make you my bitch." T'Cha Dunlevy of The Montreal Gazette described the lyric as a "promise", with Rihanna intending to act upon her desires. The interlude ends mid-verse and mid-lyric with a fade at 1:18. Katherine St. Asaph of Popdust described the fade as "ungraceful", as well as writing that it makes the track appear as though it is not finished. Upon the fade, Rihanna puts forward the line "Ooh, I wanna fuck you right now." Dunlevy and St. Asaph were critical of the final line, with the former labeling it as "blatant", and the latter noting that "cursing makes everything obvious."

"Birthday Cake"
A 24 second sample of the remix featuring Brown's vocals on "Birthday Cake". Brown sings "Give it to her in the worst way, can't wait to blow her candles out."

Brown's verse on the full-length version begins with the lyric "Girl, I wanna fuck you right now," which is the antithesis of how Rihanna concludes the original interlude, singing "Ooh, I wanna fuck you right now." Brown's verse continues with "Been a long time I've been missing your body/ Turn the lights down/ When I go down it's a private party." Brown delivers his vocals in an aggressive and manipulative manner as he sings "Give it to her in the worst way, can't wait to blow her candles out." At the end of the song, Rihanna performs new lyrics which were not included on the original 1 minute and 18 second interlude; "Remember how you did it/ If you still wanna kiss it/ Then come and get it." According to Ben Rayner of the Toronto Sun, the instrumentation of "Birthday Cake" consists of "snaky, slurpy, bass-droppin' beats." The song's lyrics revolve around sadomasochistic sexuality and dominance over men, and consists mainly of oral sex metaphors, including the lyric "Doggy want the kitty."

== Critical reception ==
"Birthday Cake" garnered mixed reviews from music critics. Jayson Lipshutz of Billboard praised the interlude, writing "We're all for birthday-themed naughtiness in pop music form, but only 78 seconds of 'Birthday Cake' is just not enough of a celebration!" Lipshutz continued to compare the song's lyrical message to Jeremih's "Birthday Sex". Sam Lansky of MTV Buzzworthy was complimentary of "Birthday Cake", writing, "The only misstep on the album – not because it's not amazing (it is!), but because it's only 78 seconds long. 'Birthday Cake' is more decadent Rihanna filth, this time courtesy of sensual R&B-master The-Dream. Have any Rihanna Navy members made an hour-long mix yet? We need to keep the bump 'n' grind going all night." Pip Ellwood of Entertainment-Focus noted that "Birthday Cake", along with "Cockiness (Love It)", "leave you under no misunderstanding that Rihanna is as sexual as she's ever been throughout her career." Melissa Maerz of Entertainment Weekly wrote that "Birthday Cake", along with "Cockiness (Love It)", were the most provocative songs on the album, describing them as "I-like-it-rough tracks", but criticized them for being album fillers designed to get the listener out of the bedroom and on to the dance floor.

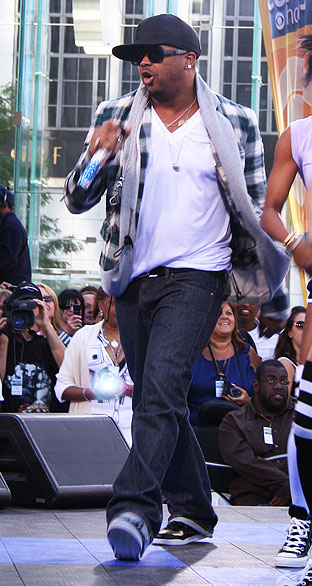
The-Dream (pictured) assisted in the songwriting and production of "Birthday Cake".

Mike Diver of BBC Music disliked "Birthday Cake" as a "wholly pointless minute-something in the company of star producer The-Dream, wasted on the boring profanities of Birthday Cake." A reviewer for Flavour had a mixed reaction to the lyrical content, writing, "I can't exactly say it is a bad song. In fact, I will probably be singing it over the next few weeks. But at this point its like, 'we get it – you like sex.' Chill out about it and sing about education or something – your younger fans need more SUBSTANCE." [sic] Nathan S. of DJ Booth noted that the song resembles a real life "quickie", continuing to write that the overtly sexual lyrics in the song earned Talk That Talk the Parental Advisory sticker. Randall Roberts of the Los Angeles Times commented that the lyrics on "Birthday Cake" "wouldn't seem out of place on Spinal Tap's 'Smell the Glove'." Roberts continued to note that "Birthday Cake" appeared to be an afterthought, writing,

The hottest lines on the album come nearly as an afterthought on the all-too-brief 'Birthday Cake,' produced by The-Dream. 'I know you wanna bite this/ It's so enticin'/ Nothin' else like this/ I'mma make you my bitch,' she sings. But as if the network censors had let the song run before realizing their mistake, a little over a minute into it the music fades out, just as it's getting dirty, leaving us wondering whether Rihanna really believes what she's selling on "Talk That Talk."

Like the interlude, the full-length version received mixed reviews from music critics. Beth Hardie for the Daily Mirror wrote that the remix came as a shock, because of how Brown "beat her virtually senseless in a car three years ago just before the Grammys", and noted that Rihanna would face harsh criticism from journalists and fans alike for not setting a good example to younger girls. Hardie continued to state that although the collaboration came as a surprise, "We have to admit, it's a pretty amazing stroke of genius in terms of publicity and messing with people’s minds." Regarding the collaboration on the remix Jo Usmar from Daily Mirror compared the collaboration to the physical altercation between Rihanna and Brown at the 2009 Grammy Awards, writing "In case you've been living in a cave for the last two years this is extraordinarily controversial as Brown was convicted of assaulting Rihanna in 2009 and there was a restraining order issued against him." Ben Rayner for the Toronto Sun was critical of the remix and the original interlude, writing that "What was empty, unfinished titillation before, then, has become empty, overstated, boardroom-written pseudo-pornography for the pop charts."

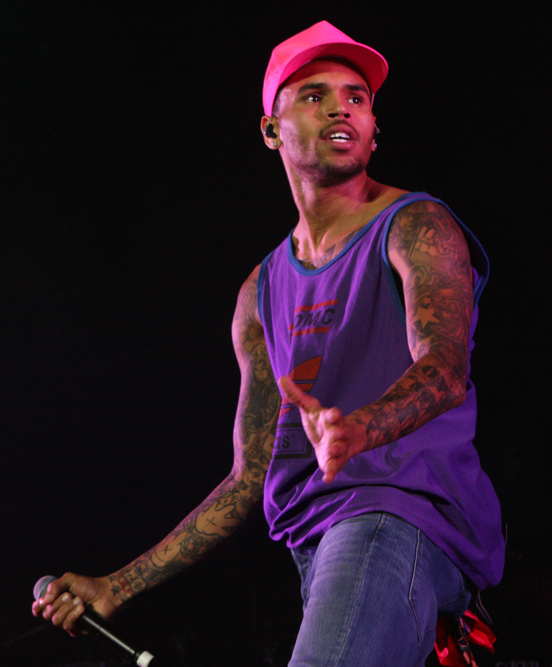
Critics were divided on the decision to include Rihanna's ex-boyfriend Chris Brown on the remix of "Birthday Cake" due to their past together.

Jon Caramanica for The New York Times commented that the remix of "Birthday Cake", as well as the original, was "very much so" a good song. However, Caramanica was critical of the collaboration itself, due to Rihanna and Brown's history, writing "You want to forget? Fine. But don't forgive." Caramanica continued to explain his distaste, writing "It displays an advanced understanding of marketing and an understanding of moral obligations and ethics that's not much more than rudimentary. It is a woman publicly accepting her abuser - nothing more, nothing less." J. Bryan Lowder for The Huffington Post labelled the song as "innuendo-iced" with regard to the song's explicit lyrics. Lowder provided an explanation for what he thought the reason was behind Rihanna asking Brown to collaborate on "Birthday Cake", writing:

Even though we know that collaborations like this are almost always commercial in motivation, we like to imagine that the artist's choice of a creative partner gives us some kind of access to their private, emotional world. Collaboration suggests a personal relationship, and our eavesdropping on that interplay conjures up a feeling of intimacy between audience and artist that is very powerful. We feel like we know what's really going on with Rihanna and Chris Brown because we are virtually present in the studio with them, and here, the thing we're meant to know is that everything's OK now. The problem is, the strategy won't work; because of an infamous leaked photograph, we were also virtually present in the car that night three years ago when Brown beat Rihanna till her face was bruised and bloodied. And that kind of terrifying intimacy is not easily forgotten.

== Chart performance ==
Upon the release of Talk That Talk, "Birthday Cake" debuted on several world charts. The song entered the South Korea Gaon International Chart at number 67 on November 26, 2011, with sales of 6,661 digital downloads. In the United Kingdom, "Birthday Cake" debuted at number 172 on December 3, 2011. In the United States, the song charted at number 22 on the US Bubbling Under Hot 100 Singles chart, which represents the 25 songs which failed to chart on the Billboard Hot 100. On March 3, 2012, "Birthday Cake" made its first appearance on the US Digital Songs chart at number 62, following the release of the official remix featuring Brown, and has peaked at number 30. Due to strong airplay spins, the interlude of "Birthday Cake" peaked at number 4 on the Hot R&B/Hip-Hop Songs chart. "Birthday Cake" was certified two-times platinum by the Recording Industry Association of America (RIAA), denoting shipments of over 2,000,000 units.

The full-length version of "Birthday Cake" debuted at number 20 on the US Billboard R&B/Hip-Hop Songs chart on chart issue dated March 10, 2012, and received both the Airplay and Greatest Gainer honors. The following week, it ascended to number 17. In its third week on the chart, the song ascended to number 7, and received the Airplay Gainer honor. The song ascended to number 4 the following week, and was awarded with the Airplay Gainer honor again. It has so far reached a peak of number 2. It debuted at number 63 on the US Billboard Hot 100 on the chart issue dated March 10, 2012. In its fourth week on the chart, the song climbed to number 39 and became the fourth Top 40 single from Talk That Talk. "Birthday Cake (Remix)" has reached a peaked of number 24. The remix of "Birthday Cake" debuted at number 73 on the Radio Songs chart, generating a 372% increase in spins, on the chart issue dated March 10, 2012. It reached a peak of number 16.

== Live performance ==
Rihanna performed the song for the first time on May 5, 2012, on Saturday Night Live, as part of a medley with "Talk That Talk". The performance started with the original interlude version "Birthday Cake" and featured Rihanna in an all black outfit with a giant spiders web as the backdrop behind her. After she performed a short section of the song, it transitioned into "Talk That Talk", where she performed her part of the song in full, without the rap vocal by Jay-Z.

Rihanna performed the full-length version at Radio 1's Hackney Weekend on May 24, 2012, as the fifth song on the set list. She performed the remix in its entirety, and sang Brown's lyrics. The full-length of the song was included on her Diamonds World Tour as part of her first act in 2013. She performed it on the Anti World Tour with a different beat in 2016 with included Rihanna rap in the song.

== Track listing ==
- Album interlude version
1. "Birthday Cake" – 1:18
- Full-length single version
1. "Birthday Cake" – 3:39

== Credits and personnel ==
Recording

- Recorded at Radisson Blu Royal Hotel, Room 1306, Copenhagen, Denmark.

Personnel

- Songwriting – Terius Nash, Robyn Fenty, Marcos Palacios, Earnest Clark
- Production – Da Internz, The-Dream
- Vocal engineering and recording – Kuk Harrell, Marcos Tovar
- Assistant vocal recording – Jennifer Rosales
- Mixing – Kevin "KD" Davis
- Assistant mixing – Calvin Bailiff

Credits adapted from the liner notes of Talk That Talk, Def Jam Recordings, SRP Records.

== Charts ==
=== Weekly charts ===
Weekly chart performance
Chart (2011–12) Interlude	Peak position
South Korea (Gaon)	67
US Billboard Hot 100	24
US Hot R&B/Hip-Hop Songs (Billboard)	4

Weekly chart performance
Chart (2012) Full-length	Peak position
US Billboard Hot 100	24
US Hot R&B/Hip-Hop Songs (Billboard)	2
US Rhythmic Airplay (Billboard)	5
US Bubbling Under Mainstream Top 40 (Billboard)	2

=== Year-end charts ===
Year-end chart performance
Chart (2012) Full-length	Position
US Billboard Hot 100	79
US Hot R&B/Hip-Hop Songs (Billboard)	15
US Rhythmic (Billboard)	28

== Certifications ==
Certifications
Region	Certification	Certified units/sales
Australia (ARIA)	Gold	35,000^{‡}
United States (RIAA)	2× Platinum	2,000,000^{‡}
^{‡} Sales+streaming figures based on certification alone.

== Release history ==
Release dates
Country	Date	Format	Version	Label
United States	February 20, 2012	Premiere	Full-length	Def Jam Recordings
United States	March 6, 2012	Urban contemporary radio	Full-length	Def Jam Recordings
