= Talk That Talk =

- Standard edition cover (Note: The deluxe edition cover features a close up black and white photo of Rihanna from the shoulders up.)

Studio album by Rihanna
- Released: November 18, 2011
- Recorded: July–November 2011
- Genres: Pop; dance; R&B
- Length: 37:29
- Labels: Roc Nation; SRP; Def Jam
- Producers: Alex da Kid; Mr. Bangladesh; Calvin Harris; Chase & Status; Cirkut; Da Internz; Dr. Luke; Ester Dean; Gareth McGrillen; Hit-Boy; No I.D.; Rob Swire; Stargate; The-Dream

Rihanna chronology
Loud (2010)	Talk That Talk (2011)	Unapologetic (2012)

Singles from Talk That Talk
- 1. "We Found Love" Released: September 22, 2011; 2. "You da One" Released: November 14, 2011; 3. "Talk That Talk" Released: January 17, 2012; 4. "Where Have You Been" Released: April 17, 2012

Talk That Talk is the sixth studio album by Barbadian singer Rihanna. It was released on November 18, 2011 by Def Jam Recordings, SRP Records, and Roc Nation. Talk That Talk was recorded during the Loud Tour between July and November 2011. It was originally planned to be a reissue of her previous studio album Loud (2010). As executive producer, Rihanna enlisted a wide range of producers including Alex da Kid, Calvin Harris, Chase & Status, No I.D., and Stargate to achieve her desired sound. Following in the same vein as Loud, Talk That Talk is a dance-oriented pop/R&B crossover album that incorporates elements of hip-hop, dubstep, electronic and house music. The album also contains subtle dancehall influences while its lyrical content and themes revolve around a nihilistic, romantic, and lascivious lover.

Talk That Talk received generally positive reviews from music critics, who praised the album's lyrics. Others were less favorable of its themes. Talk That Talk debuted at number three on the US Billboard 200 with first-week sales of 198,000 copies and went on to sell 1.15 million copies in the United States by June 2015. The album also peaked at number one in Austria, New Zealand, Norway, Switzerland and the United Kingdom, where it debuted at number one on the UK Albums Chart, selling 163,000 copies in its first week. As of April 2012, the album has been certified triple Platinum by the British Phonographic Industry (BPI) for shipments of 900,000 copies. According to the International Federation of the Phonographic Industry (IFPI), Talk That Talk was the ninth global best-selling album of 2011. As of March 2013, the album has sold more than 5.5 million copies worldwide.

The album produced six singles, led by "We Found Love". The song became an international hit, topping the charts of 27 countries, including the US Billboard Hot 100, where it became Rihanna's eleventh number-one song and her longest-running chart-topper, spending 10 weeks at the top. "You da One", "Talk That Talk" (featuring rapper Jay-Z) and a remix of "Birthday Cake" (featuring Chris Brown) experienced moderate success, while "Where Have You Been" reached the top ten of twenty countries around the world. A remixed form of "Cockiness (Love It)" (featuring rapper ASAP Rocky) was released to further promote the album.

== Background ==
Following the release of Rihanna's previous studio album, Loud (2010), the singer revealed that the album would be re-issued with new songs and released in fall 2011. In September 2011, Rihanna confirmed that plans for a re-issue of Loud had been scrapped, with the singer tweeting "I [thought about] a [re-release], but LOUD is its own body of work! Plus [you] guys work so [fucking] hard that [you] deserve to act brand new."

In an interview with Mixtape Daily, songwriter Verse Simmonds, half of the duo The Jugganauts, who wrote and produced the reggae-infused song "Man Down" from Loud, revealed that the singer was nearing completion of her sixth studio album in August 2011. The duo also said that they had penned two tracks for possible inclusion on the album, saying "From what I understand, she is closing the album up now, and we did two records for her that she really, really loved and I'm really excited about them as well" and also expressed interest in writing a third song. On September 15, 2011, Rihanna confirmed that recording sessions for the album were indeed underway, tweeting "I can't wait to start filling u guys in on some details!"

Rihanna created a Facebook campaign page entitled "Rihanna: UNLOCKED" [sic], whereby her fans on Facebook are given missions to complete, in the form of games, in order to "unlock" new information about the album. Upon the unveiling of the standard edition's artwork, both James Dinh of MTV and a reviewer for NME commented that Rihanna looks "seductive" in the image.

== Recording and production ==
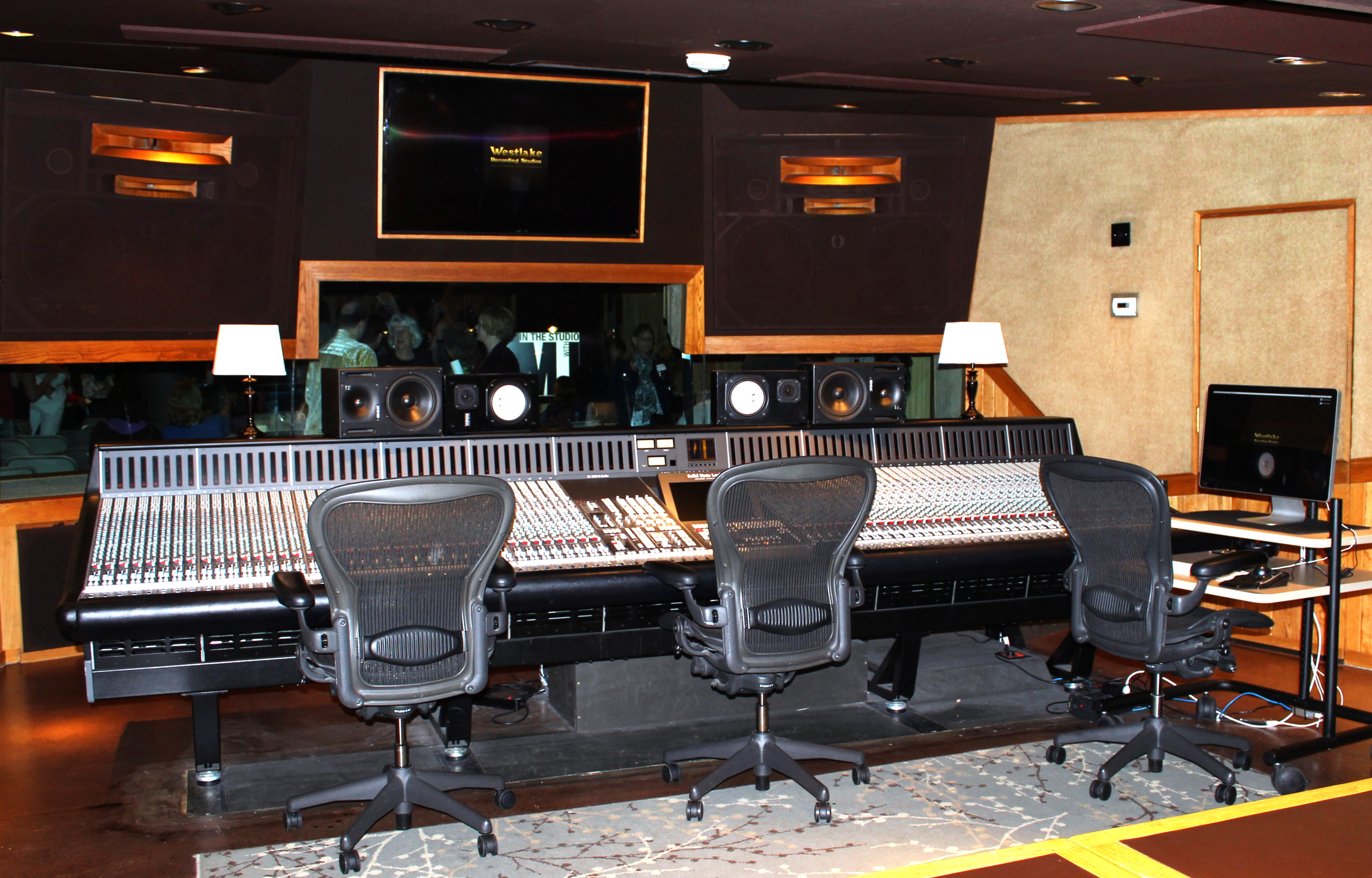
Westlake Recording Studios was one of many locations in which the album was recorded.

Recording sessions for Talk That Talk began in July 2011 and ended in November 2011. Recording for the album took place during the Loud Tour. Due to this, recording sessions for the album took place in various countries including France, United Kingdom, Norway, Denmark and Germany. Vocal producer Kurk Harrell estimates the album was cut in more than 25 cities. Rihanna recorded a total of sixteen to seventeen songs. The singer would record late into the morning, sometimes until noon, before riding her bus to the next city. In May 2012, Rihanna revealed that whilst she was recording the album, she suffered from exhaustion, saying in part: "It was the best [shit] ever, it was some rock star [shit] This is the craziest schedule I've ever been on in my entire life. One morning I woke up and started crying so hard. I finally just got to my bed from the IV [drip] and I was just like, 'Good I can actually get to sleep tonight', because we stayed up all night' and I finished [the album] at 5 pm the day before..."

Kuk Harrell, one of the producers of Talk That Talk, spoke on the recording of the album saying: "In addition to touring, we are recording Rihanna's new album. We have a portable studio that we set up at the different hotels that we are staying at. We set up shop anywhere in the hotel. Before we went on the European leg of Rihanna's Loud tour, we started recording the album in Los Angeles. Rihanna likes to work late hours, so she would come into the studio at 9pm and work until 6am." Continuing Harrell stated "The show was the priority, and then the album. That's how the day was broken up." Expanding on this Harrell stated that Rihanna would perform every night, finish her meet and greet by 1 a.m. Then go to the studio for around two or three a.m. During these session Harrell stated "I’d make the decision based off [sic] where I felt her voice was. Knowing she just did two hours of a show and meet-and-greets, I would suggest capturing the stuff that was easier to get like the lower-range stuff so we wouldn’t hurt or damage her voice."

== Composition ==
=== Music and lyrics ===
Talk That Talk is a danceable pop/R&B crossover album, comprising uptempo club tracks, raunchy pop songs, and mid-tempo inspirational ballads. It also incorporates elements of dancehall, hip hop, and house. Most of the songs feature heavy bass and coarse sounds, including electro beats and imposing synthesizers. James Lachno of The Daily Telegraph cites Talk That Talk as Rihanna's "most club-ready album to date", while Robert Christgau calls it "pop without shame—her hookiest and most dance-targeted album, decorated with a thoughtful assortment of suitably titillating blats, noodles, dubs, groans, hiccups, boom-booms, cut-ups, speed-ups, xx samples, and spoken-word bits." Jon Caramanica of The New York Times writes that Rihanna's version of dance music on the album draws on "the club music of the early 1990s".

"You da One"
A 17-second sample of "You da One"'s chorus, which features the mid-tempo pop and electropop composition.

The album's lyrics posit Rihanna as a nihilist romantic and lascivious lover. The album also has subtle dancehall influences, with slower songs that have double-snare riddims. Music journalist Greg Kot observes that, along with droning electronic sounds, "Caribbean and Eastern touches from past Rihanna albums get recycled into bombastic dance tunes." Apart from its sexual innuendo, Talk That Talk features odes to dysfunctional love and universal love. Christgau interprets the lyrics to be "associating carnality with love" and writes that the album "celebrates the relationship of sex to love rather than pain," before leaning on "heart songs and theme statements" in the second half."

=== Songs ===
The opening track, "You Da One", which was produced by Dr. Luke, is a bouncy mid-tempo song with a Caribbean flavor, and features a dubstep influenced breakdown towards the middle of the song. "Where Have You Been", produced by Dr. Luke and Ester Dean, runs through an acoustic beat and incorporates elements of trance. The lead single, "We Found Love", is an electro house and dance-pop song. The title track features rapper Jay-Z and samples The Notorious B.I.G.'s "I Got a Story to Tell". "Roc Me Out" is set in "chugging" tempo and features heavy synths. The tenth track, "Watch n' Learn", features a flirtatious and playful hip pop melody with grinding synths. The final standard edition track of the album, "Farewell", is a ballad. The song was written by Ester Dean and Alexander Grant, with production helmed by Grant under his production name Alex da Kid. "Farewell" contains lyrics that revolve around saying goodbye to a lover who is not able to be physically present in the relationship for long periods of time. Instrumentation consists of a rolling piano.

Additional tracks released on the deluxe edition of Talk That Talk include the songs "Red Lipstick", "Do Ya Thang", and "Fool in Love". "Red Lipstick" is described as a "dark 'n' twisted" dubstep number which was written by The Dream and Rihanna and produced by the two along with production duo Chase & Status, who first worked with the singer on her fourth studio album, Rated R (2009). "Do Ya Thang" is a contemporary R&B track with a subtle hook and a simple message. It was written and produced by Rihanna and The-Dream. "Fool in Love" is a rhapsodic ballad which incorporates acoustic and electric guitars, synthesizers, and drums, and has received comparisons to Britney Spears' "Criminal".

== Singles ==
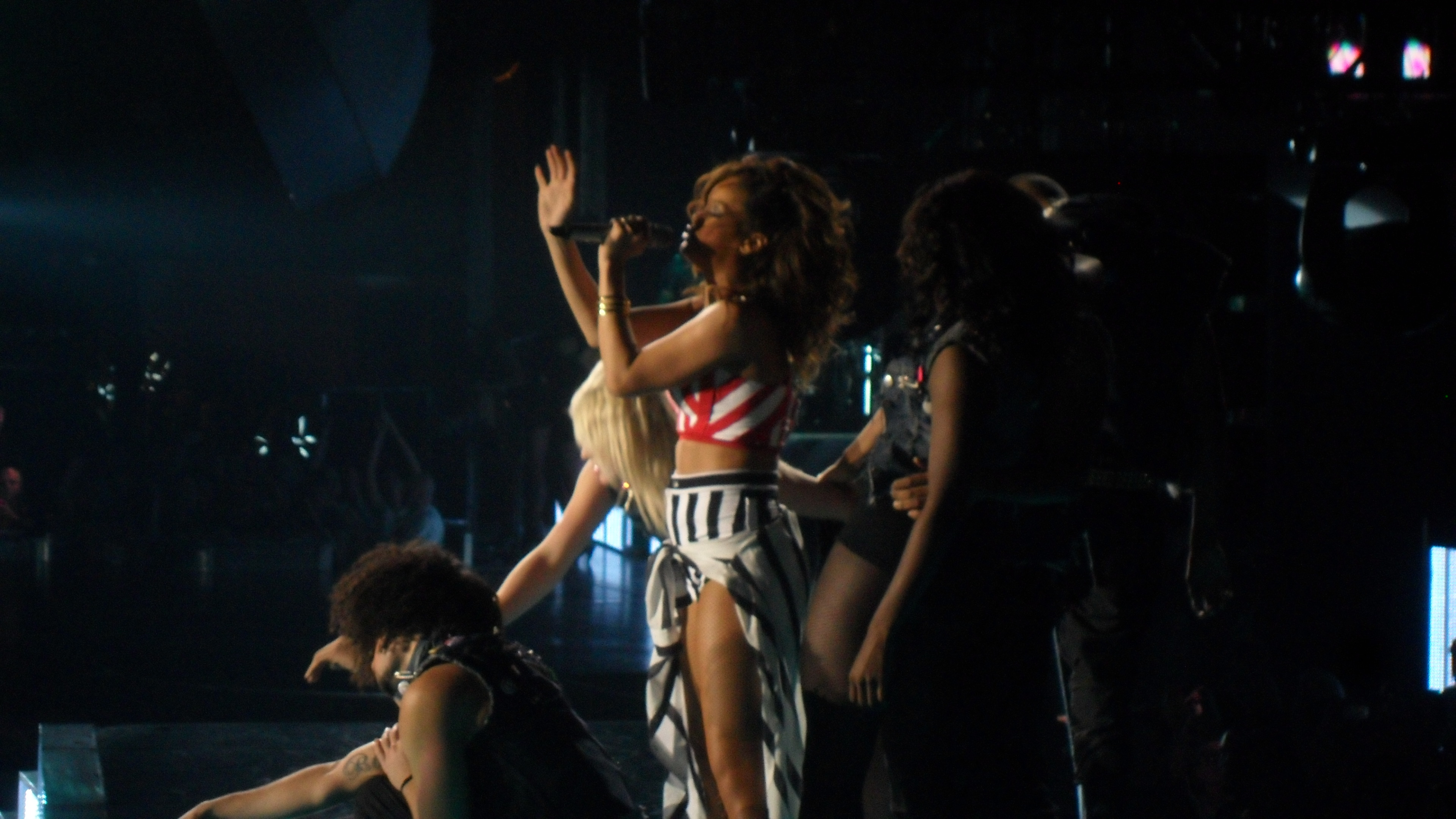
Rihanna performing "We Found Love" during her Loud Tour in November 2011.

"We Found Love", featuring Calvin Harris, was released as the lead single from the album, premiering on September 22, 2011 in the United Kingdom, and being released the same day. Critical reaction was mixed. They criticized the lack of lyrical content, with many citing the lyrics as second best to the song's production and composition, though they praised Harris's production of the song. The music video, which premiered on October 19, 2011, depicts the singer as a drug abusing thrill seeker in a relationship that quickly spirals downward into addiction and violence. "We Found Love" debuted at number 16 on the US Billboard Hot 100 chart, eventually reaching number one, giving Rihanna the record for a solo artist to have amassed twenty top ten singles in the shortest amount of time in the history of the Billboard Hot 100 chart.

"You da One" was released as the second single from the album, having its radio premiere on November 11 and being released digitally on November 14, 2011. The single was a moderate success, reaching the top twenty of the US Billboard Hot 100 peaking at fourteen as well as reaching the top twenty of the UK Singles Chart peaking at sixteen, while also topping the US Hot Dance Club Songs chart, and attaining top twenty positions in eleven other countries. "Talk That Talk", was confirmed as the third single from the album, following a vote from her fans. The song, which features a rap verse from Jay-Z, was serviced to urban radio in the United States on January 17, 2012.

"Birthday Cake" was released as a full length remix version featuring former boyfriend Chris Brown on February 20, 2012, coinciding with Rihanna's 24th birthday. It was sent to radio as the fourth single from the album on March 6, 2012.

"Where Have You Been" was released as the fifth single from the album, impacting contemporary hit radio and rhythmic contemporary radio stations in the United States on April 17, 2012. Commercially, "Where Have You Been" was an international success, peaking at number five in the US for two weeks. In addition to attaining top five positions in the Czech Republic, Denmark, France, Israel, New Zealand and the United Kingdom, while peaking in the top ten of charts in twenty countries worldwide including Australia, Belgium and Norway. The song is certified Platinum or higher in eight countries.

"Cockiness (Love It)" was released as the sixth and final single on September 7, 2012 in a remixed form of the original version and features rapper ASAP Rocky. Upon the release of Talk That Talk, the song debuted on multiple world charts. The song debuted on the South Korea Gaon International Chart at number 62 on November 26, 2011, with sales of 6,918 digital downloads. In the United Kingdom, "Cockiness (Love It)" debuted at number 33 on the UK R&B Chart on November 27, 2011. It also debuted on the UK Singles Chart at number 121 in the chart issue December 3, 2011. In the United States, the song debuted on the US Billboard Bubbling Under Hot 100 chart at number 17 in the chart issue December 10, 2011.

== Release and promotion ==
=== Live performances ===
"We Found Love" was the first performed song from the album, as it was performed for the first time on November 14, 2011 at Rihanna's Loud Tour (2011) in London. On November 17, 2011 Rihanna performed the song on first season of The X Factor USA. On November 20, 2011 Rihanna performed the song on eighth season of The X Factor UK. On February 12, 2012, Rihanna performed "We Found Love" at the 2012 Grammy Awards held at the Staples Center in Los Angeles, followed by her duet single "Princess of China" with Coldplay for first time. Later that month, the singer performed the song at the 2012 BRIT Awards held on February 21, 2012 at The O2 Arena in London. Whilst promoting her first feature film appearance in Battleship, Rihanna made a rare visit to Japan, performing "We Found Love" on the Japanese music television program Music Station. She donned a traditional kimono and concluded the performance by crowd surfing into the audience.

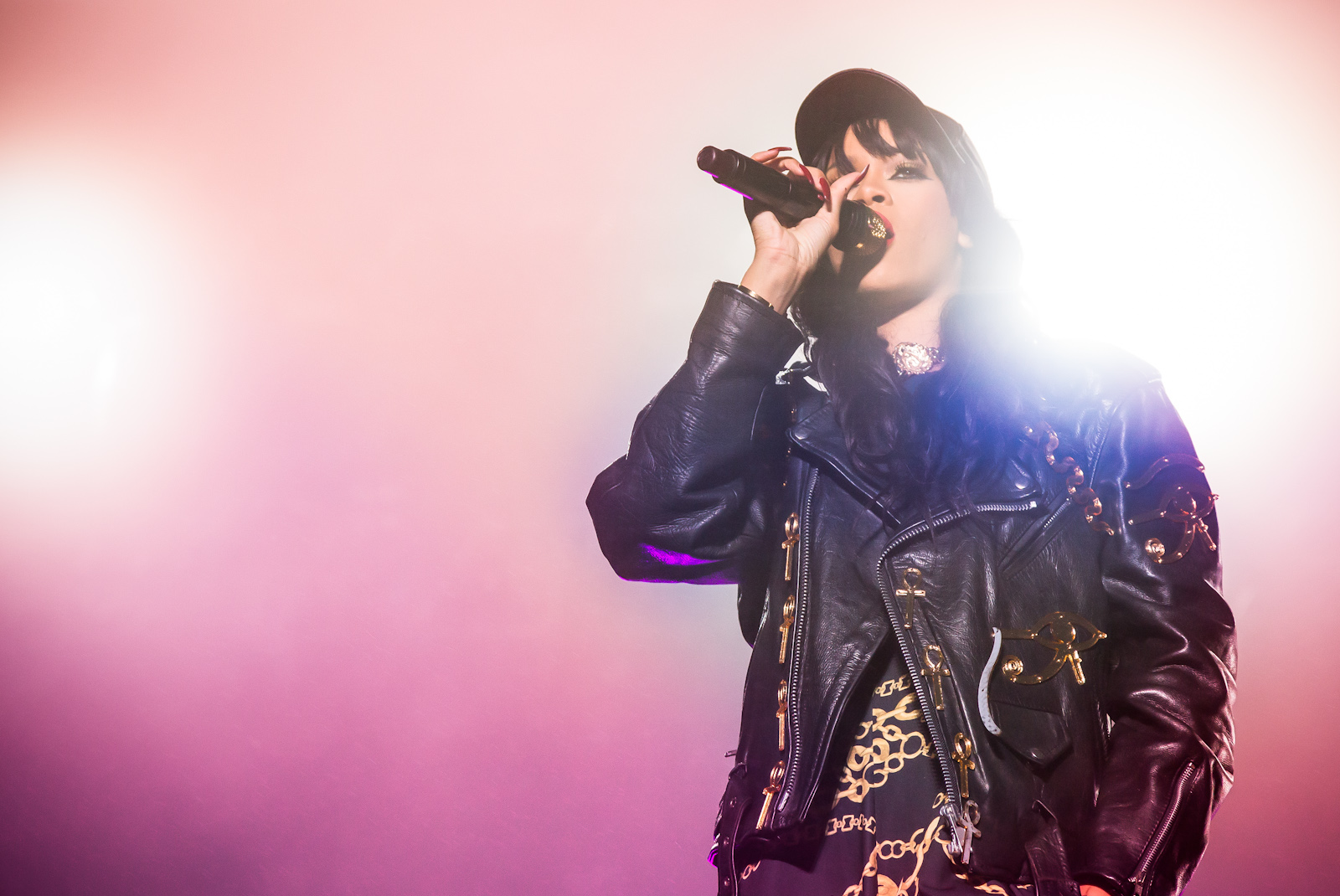
Rihanna performing during Kollen Music Festival in June 2012

Rihanna performed "Where Have You Been" for the first time live at the 2012 Post-Grammy Charity Fundraiser, along with "We Found Love", on February 13, 2012. On May 5, 2012, she sang "Where Have You Been" and a Medley of "Birthday Cake" and "Talk That Talk" on Saturday Night Live in the United States. The performance of "Where Have You Been" featured an aesthetic similar to that of the music video; the SNL set was decorated in a One Thousand and One Nights fashion. Rihanna and her backup dancers performed a highly choreographed dance routine, the same as the music video, and they wore Arabian inspired outfits. The performance of the medley with the original interlude version of "Birthday Cake" and "Talk That Talk" started with the singer performing "Birthday Cake" and featured Rihanna in an all black outfit with a giant spiders web as the backdrop behind her. After she performed a short section of the song, it transitioned into "Talk That Talk", where she performed her part of the song in full, without the rap vocal by Jay-Z. On May 14, 2012, Rihanna performed "Where Have You Been" at the 2012 Robin Hood Benefit in New York. The performance was in Cleopatra style. Rihanna also performed the song on American Idol's season 11 finale on May 23, 2012.

Rihanna later performed "We Found Love", "Talk That Talk", "Birthday Cake" and "Where Have You Been" at Radio 1's Hackney Weekend on May 24, 2012, where she also performed her previous singles "Run This Town" and "Umbrella". Lastly, on September 6, 2012, Rihanna and ASAP Rocky performed the remix of "Cockiness (Love It)" at the 2012 MTV Video Music Awards in a medley with "We Found Love".

=== Documentary ===
The album was supported by a two-part documentary, "Road to Talk That Talk", that shows Rihanna behind the scenes during its production. The first part of "Road to Talk That Talk", which was released onto the internet on February 17, 2012, shows Rihanna back stage on the last day of her Loud Tour, and in the studio whilst she talks about the track listing of Talk That Talk, and in Barbados with her family. The second part of "Road to Talk That Talk", which was released May 9, 2012, shows Rihanna during the rest of her trip to Barbados, and in the hotel where she was with Katy Perry, and behind the scenes of the photoshoots, and talking about her breakdown.

== Critical reception ==
Professional ratings
Aggregate scores
Source	Rating
AnyDecentMusic?	6.0/10
Metacritic	64/100
Review scores
Source	Rating
AllMusic	3.5/5 stars
The Daily Telegraph	4/5 stars
The Guardian	4/5 stars
The Independent	2/5 stars
MSN Music (Expert Witness)	A−
NME	5/10
Pitchfork	6/10
Rolling Stone	3.5/5 stars
Spin	8/10
The Times	3/5 stars

Talk That Talk received generally positive reviews from critics. At Metacritic, which assigns a normalized rating out of 100 to reviews from mainstream publications, the album received an average score of 64, based on 27 reviews. AllMusic's Andy Kellman dubbed it Rihanna's "third best album to date ... behind Good Girl Gone Bad (2007) and Rated R (2009)," and stated, "Minus the fluff, it's close to the latter's equal." Jon Caramanica of The New York Times wrote that the album places Rihanna "squarely at the center of the pop genre best suited for a singer of her fundamental evanescence – dance music, which conveniently is the mode du jour of contemporary R&B and pop." James Lachno of The Daily Telegraph called it "an adrenalised behemoth of a record which reasserts her position as one of pop's most compulsive pleasures". Rebecca Nicholson of The Guardian called it "a blast of obnoxious, filth-fuelled pop" and felt that "it works best when the music hall bawdiness is left aside in favour of bleak euphoria". In a review of its deluxe edition for MSN Music, Robert Christgau complimented the songs' carnal lyrics and stated, "I prefer it to her earlier albums because I find its many porny moments titillating."

In a mixed review, Randall Roberts of the Los Angeles Times expressed dissatisfaction with the themes of the album and stated, "The singer works that NC-17 territory, but the sauciness sometimes borders on shtick. With an eye toward Middle America, it's mostly just insinuation." Greg Kot of the Chicago Tribune panned its "double or single entendres", and felt that it gives the impression of "a chintzy soft-core porn movie." Andy Gill of The Independent said that Rihanna mostly "struggles to assert her vocal character against a sea of effects". Matthew Cole from Slant Magazine panned it as "pretty easily the worst Rihanna album yet". Pitchfork's Lindsay Zoladz wrote that the album "tries too hard to send a more one-dimensional message" than other pop artists in 2011, adding that it "ends up falling flat". Priya Elan of NME found it "annoyingly safe" and wrote that it "leaves us with the impression Rihanna has spread herself so thinly that she doesn’t have time to record a cohesive album."

== Commercial performance ==
The album debuted at number three on the US Billboard 200, with first-week sales of 198,000 copies in the United States, slightly below her last album, which also debuted at number three with 207,000 copies. In its second week, the album sold an additional 68,200 copies in the United States, dropping to number 7 on the charts and bringing its total sales to 266,400 units sold. On November 17, 2026, Talk That Talk was certified 4× Platinum by the Recording Industry Association of America (RIAA), marking shipments of over four million album-equivalent units. It has sold over 1,150,000 copies in the United States as of June 2015.

In the United Kingdom, the album was certified Platinum by the British Phonographic Industry (BPI) for shipments of 300,000 units after six days of sale. Talk That Talk debuted at number one on the UK Albums Chart, selling more than 163,000 copies in its first week. With the album and "We Found Love" both at number one, it made Rihanna the only female artist in the UK to simultaneously have a number one single and album twice in the same year with a different album and single. The other double chart topper being "What's My Name?" and Loud in January 2011. On December 9, 2011 the album was certified two-times Platinum by the British Phonographic Industry (BPI) for shipments of 600,000 copies in the UK. As of May 2013 it has sold 1,000,000 copies.

It was the second biggest selling R&B / hip hop album of 2011 in the UK, only beaten by Rihanna's previous album, Loud (2010). On August 12, 2012, the album returned to the number one position of the UK Albums Chart, selling 9,578 copies, making it the UK's lowest-selling number one since records began. The record was beaten 4 years later by Blossoms' self-titled album which sold 7,948 copies on August 19, 2016. As of March 2013, the album has sold more than 5.5 million copies worldwide.

== Track listing ==
Standard edition
No.	Title	Writer(s)	Producer(s)	Length
1.	"You da One"	Ester Dean; Lukasz Gottwald; Robyn Fenty; John Hill; Henry Walter	Dr. Luke; Cirkut; Kuk Harrell^{[a]}	3:18
2.	"Where Have You Been"	Dean; Gottwald; Calvin Harris; Walter; Geoff Mack	Dr. Luke; Cirkut; Harris; Harrell^{[a]}	4:02
3.	"We Found Love" (featuring Calvin Harris)	Harris	Harris; Harrell^{[a]}	3:35
4.	"Talk That Talk" (featuring Jay-Z)	Dean; Mikkel S. Eriksen; Tor Erik Hermansen; Shawn Carter; Anthony Best; Sean Combs; Carl Thompson; Christopher Wallace	Stargate; Harrell^{[a]}	3:30
5.	"Cockiness (Love It)"	Candice Pillay; Dwayne Abernathy; Shondrae "Mr. Bangladesh" Crawford; Fenty	Crawford; Harrell^{[a]}	2:58
6.	"Birthday Cake"	Terius "The-Dream" Nash; Fenty; Marcos Palacios; Earnest Clark	Da Internz; Nash^{[b]}; Harrell^{[a]}	1:18
7.	"We All Want Love"	Dean; Ernest Wilson; Steve Wyreman; Kevin Randolph	No I.D.; Harrell^{[a]}	3:57
8.	"Drunk on Love"	Dean; Eriksen; Hermansen; Baria Qureshi; Romy Madley Croft; Oliver Sim; Jamie Smith	Stargate; Harrell^{[a]}	3:31
9.	"Roc Me Out"	Dean; Eriksen; Hermansen; Rob Swire; Gareth McGrillen	Stargate; Knife Party; Harrell^{[a]}	3:29
10.	"Watch n' Learn"	Chauncey Hollis; Priscilla Renea; Alja Jackson; Fenty	Hit-Boy; Harrell^{[a]}	3:31
11.	"Farewell"	Dean; Alexander Grant	Alex da Kid; Harrell^{[a]}	4:16
Total length:				37:29

Deluxe edition
No.	Title	Writer(s)	Producer(s)	Length
12.	"Red Lipstick"	Nash; Fenty; James Hetfield; Lars Ulrich; William Kennard; Saul Milton	Chase & Status; Harrell^{[a]}	3:37
13.	"Do Ya Thang"	Nash; Fenty	Nash; Harrell^{[a]}	3:43
14.	"Fool in Love"	Dean; Gottwald; Walter	Dr. Luke; Cirkut; Dean; Harrell^{[a]}	4:15
Total length:				49:04

=== Notes ===
- ^{^[a]} signifies a vocal producer
- ^{^[b]} signifies a co-producer
- iTunes Store includes the Calvin Harris extended mix of "We Found Love".

=== Sample credits ===
- "Where Have You Been" contains elements from the composition "I've Been Everywhere" written by Geoff Mack.
- "Talk That Talk" contains samples from The Notorious B.I.G. recording "I Got a Story to Tell" written by Anthony Best, Sean Combs, Carl Thompson and Christopher Wallace.
- "Cockiness (Love It)" contains samples from Greg Kinnear's performance of "Summertime" in the 2003 film Stuck On You, originally performed by Billy Stewart, written by DuBose Heyward.
- "Drunk on Love" contains samples from the recording "Intro" as performed by the xx and written by Baria Qureshi, Romy Madley Croft, Oliver Sim and Jamie Smith.
- "Red Lipstick" contains samples from the song "Wherever I May Roam" as performed by Metallica and written by James Hetfield and Lars Ulrich. Contains a sample from the sound recording "Saxon" performed by Chase & Status and written by William Kennard and Saul Milton.

== Personnel and credits ==
=== Recording studios ===
Credits for Talk That Talk deluxe edition:

- Sofital Paris Le Laubourg Room 538 (Paris, France)
- Westlake Recording Studios (Hollywood, CA)
- Eightysevenfourteen Studios (Los Angeles, CA)
- Eyeknowasecret Studios (Los Angeles, CA)
- Fly Eye Studios (London, England)
- Roc the Mic Studios (New York, NY)
- Jungle City Studios (New York, NY)
- The Hide Out Studios (London, England)
- Radisson Blue Royal Hotel Room 1306 (Copenhagen, Denmark)
- 4220 Studios (Hollywood, CA)
- The Amstel Intercontinental Hotel Room 123 (Amsterdam, Netherlands)
- The Park Hyatt Hotel Room 341 (Hamburg, Germany)
- Festhalle Frankfurt Dressing Room (Frankfurt, Germany)
- No. 4 Entertainment (New York, NY)
- Pelican Hill (Newport Beach, CA)
- Studio de la Grande Armee (Paris, France)
- Grand Hotel Room 654 (Stockholm, Sweden)

=== Personnel ===
- Alex da Kid – producer (track 11)
- Mike Anderson – engineer (tracks 4, is 8, 9)
- Calvin Bailiff – assistant mix engineer (tracks 6, 12)
- Alejandro Barajas – assistant vocal engineer (tracks 1, 3, 8)
- Nuno Bettencourt – guitar (track 14)
- Tim Blacksmith – executive producer (tracks 4, 8, 9)
- Jay Brown – A&R
- Chase – producer (track 12)
- Cirkut – producer, instrumentation, and programming (tracks 1, 2, 14)
- Ernest Tuo Clark — producer (track 6)
- Carol Corless – package production
- Shondrae "Mr. Bangladesh" Crawford – producer, instrumentation, and programming (track 5)
- Danny D. – executive producer (tracks 4, 8, 9)
- Kevin "KD" Davis – mixing (tracks 6, 12)
- Ester Dean – producer (track 14)
- Aubry "Big Juice" Delaine – engineer (tracks 1, 2, 14)
- Mikkel S. Eriksen – producer, engineer, and instrumentation (tracks 4, 8, 9)
- Robyn Rihanna Fenty – vocals, executive producer
- Chris Galland – mixing assistant (tracks 7, 11, 13)
- Chris Gehringer – mastering
- Serban Ghenea – mixing (tracks 1, 2, 14)
- Clint Gibbs – engineer (tracks 1, 2, 14)
- Omar Grant – A&R
- John Hanes – mixing engineer (track 1, 2, 14)
- Kuk Harrell – vocal producer and vocal engineer (all tracks), engineer (track 12)
- Calvin Harris – producer, engineer, and instruments (tracks 2, 3); programming (track 2); mixing (track 3)
- Tor Erik Hermansen – producer and instrumentation (tracks 4, 8, 9)
- John Hill – instrumentation and programming (track 1)
- Hit-Boy – producer (track 10)
- Sam Holland – additional engineering (track 13)
- Ghazi Hourani – assistant mix engineer (track 5)
- Jay-Z – rap (track 4)
- Terese Joseph – A&R
- Rob Kinelski – music engineer (track 7)
- Damien Lewis – mixing assistant (track 3)
- Omar Loya – assistant music engineer (track 7)
- Dr. Luke – producer, programming, and instrumentation (tracks 1, 2, 14)
- Tyron Machhausen – makeup
- Erik Madrid – mixing assistant (tracks 7, 11, 13)
- Deborah Mannis-Gardner – sample clearance
- Scott Marcus – A&R
- Manny Marroquin – mixing (tracks 7, 11, 13)
- Fabian Marasciullo – mixing (track 5)
- Katie Mitzell – production coordination (tracks 1, 2, 14)
- Skylar Mones – music engineer (track 10)
- Terius "The-Dream" Nash – producer (track 13), co-producer (track 6)
- No I.D. – producer (track 7)
- Mel Ottenberg – wardrobe
- Marcos "Kosine" Palacios — producer (track 6)
- Ciarra Pardo – art direction, creative director
- Kevin Randolph – keyboards (track 7)
- Irene Richter – production coordination (tracks 1, 2, 14)
- Daniella Rivera – additional and assistant engineer (tracks 4, 8, 9)
- JP Robinson – art direction
- Evan Rogers – executive producer
- Jennifer Rosales – assistant vocal engineer (tracks 1, 2, 4-14)
- Gabriela Schwartz – marketing
- Chris Sclafani – assistant engineer (tracks 1, 2, 14)
- Phil Seaford – assistant mixing engineer (tracks 1, 2, 14)
- Jonathan Sher – assistant engineer (tracks 1, 2, 14)
- Status – producer (track 12)
- Ursula Stephens – hair stylist
- Yusef Stephens – hair stylist
- Carl Sturken – executive producer
- Phil Tan – mixing (tracks 3, 4, 8, 9)
- Ludovick Tartavel – assistant engineer (track 13)
- Dan Tobiason – assistant vocal engineer for Jay-Z (track 4)
- Abou Thiam – A&R
- Pat Thrall – engineer (track 13)
- Marcos Tovar – vocal engineer (all tracks), mixing (track 10), engineer (track 12)
- TT – assistant vocal engineer (track 10)
- Ellen von Unwerth – photography
- Miles Walker – engineer (tracks 4, 8, 9)
- Eric Wong – marketing
- Steve Wyreman – guitar and bass (track 7)
- The xx – instrumentation (track 8)
- Jordan "DJ Swivel" Young – vocal engineer for Jay-Z (track 4)

== Charts ==
=== Weekly charts ===
Weekly chart performance for Talk That Talk
Chart (2011)	Peak position
Australian Albums (ARIA)	5
Australian Urban Albums (ARIA)	1
Austrian Albums (Ö3 Austria)	1
Belgian Albums (Ultratop Flanders)	3
Belgian Albums (Ultratop Wallonia)	6
Canadian Albums (Billboard)	3
Croatian International Albums (HDU)	3
Czech Albums (ČNS IFPI)	16
Danish Albums (Hitlisten)	10
Dutch Albums (Album Top 100)	6
Finnish Albums (Suomen virallinen lista)	16
French Albums (SNEP)	2
German Albums (Offizielle Top 100)	3
Greek Albums (IFPI Greece)	10
Hungarian Albums (MAHASZ)	18
Irish Albums (IRMA)	2
Italian Albums (FIMI)	10
Japanese Albums (Oricon)	11
Mexican Albums (Top 100 Mexico)	21
New Zealand Albums (RMNZ)	1
Norwegian Albums (VG-lista)	1
Polish Albums (OLiS)	2
Portuguese Albums (AFP)	14
Russian Albums (2M)	3
Scottish Albums (Official Charts)	1
South African Albums (RISA)	7
South Korean Albums (Gaon)	44
South Korean International Albums (Gaon)	8
Spanish Albums (Promusicae)	6
Swedish Albums (Sverigetopplistan)	26
Swiss Albums (Schweizer Hitparade)	1
UK Albums (Official Charts)	1
UK R&B Albums (Official Charts)	1
US Billboard 200	3
US Top R&B/Hip-Hop Albums (Billboard)	1

=== Year-end charts ===
Year-end chart performance for Talk That Talk
Chart (2011)	Position
Australian Albums (ARIA)	46
Australian Hip-Hop/R&B Albums (ARIA)	8
Danish Albums (Hitlisten)	34
Dutch Albums (Album Top 100)	73
French Albums (SNEP)	32
German Albums (Offizielle Top 100)	44
Hungarian Albums (MAHASZ)	69
Irish Albums (IRMA)	8
New Zealand Albums (RMNZ)	21
Polish Albums (OLiS)	43
Swiss Albums (Schweizer Hitparade)	36
UK Albums (Official Charts)	10
Worldwide Albums (IFPI)	9

Chart (2012)	Position
Australian Albums (ARIA)	62
Australian Hip-Hop/R&B Albums (ARIA)	5
Canadian Albums (Billboard)	14
French Albums (SNEP)	49
Hungarian Albums (MAHASZ)	70
Italian Albums (FIMI)	98
Japanese Albums (Oricon)	97
Swiss Albums (Schweizer Hitparade	40
UK Albums (Official Charts)	19
US Billboard 200	8
US Digital Albums (Billboard)	18
US R&B/Hip Hop Albums Chart	2

=== Decade-end charts ===
2010s-end chart performance for Talk That Talk
Chart (2010–2019)	Position
UK Albums (Official Charts)	42
US Billboard 200	127

=== All-time charts ===
All-time chart performance for Talk That Talk
Chart	Position
Irish Female Albums (IRMA)	48

== Certifications ==
Certifications and sales for Talk That Talk
Region	Certification	Certified units/sales
Australia (ARIA)	2× Platinum	140,000^{‡}
Austria (IFPI Austria)	Gold	10,000^{*}
Belgium (BRMA)	Gold	15,000^{*}
Brazil (Pro-Música Brasil)	Gold	20,000^{*}
Denmark (IFPI Danmark)	3× Platinum	60,000^{‡}
France	—	200,000
Germany (BVMI)	Platinum	200,000^{‡}
Hungary (MAHASZ)	Gold	3,000^{^}
Ireland (IRMA)	3× Platinum	45,000^{^}
Italy (FIMI)	Platinum	50,000^{‡}
Japan (RIAJ)	Gold	100,000^{^}
New Zealand (RMNZ)	4× Platinum	60,000^{‡}
Poland (ZPAV)	3× Platinum	60,000^{*}
Singapore (RIAS)	Gold	5,000^{*}
Spain (Promusicae)	Gold	30,000^{^}
Sweden (GLF)	Gold	20,000^{‡}
Switzerland (IFPI Switzerland)	Platinum	30,000^{^}
United Kingdom (BPI)	3× Platinum	1,000,000
United States (RIAA)	4× Platinum	4,000,000^{‡}
Summaries
Europe (IFPI)	Platinum	1,000,000^{*}
Worldwide	—	5,500,000
^{*} Sales figures based on certification alone.^{^} Shipments figures based on certification alone.^{‡} Sales+streaming figures based on certification alone.

== Release history ==
Release dates for Talk That Talk
Region	Date	Format(s)	Label	Edition(s)
Australia	November 18, 2011	CD, digital download	Universal Music	Standard, deluxe
Germany	November 18, 2011	CD, digital download	Universal Music	Standard, deluxe
Ireland	November 18, 2011	CD, digital download	Universal Music	Standard
Poland	November 18, 2011	CD, digital download	Universal Music	Standard, deluxe
Canada	November 21, 2011	CD, digital download	Universal Music	Standard, deluxe
France	November 21, 2011	CD, digital download	Def Jam	Standard, deluxe
Italy	November 21, 2011	CD, digital download	Def Jam	Standard, deluxe
United Kingdom	November 21, 2011	CD, digital download	Mercury	Standard, deluxe
United States	November 21, 2011	CD, digital download	Def Jam	Standard, deluxe
Japan	November 23, 2011	CD, digital download	Universal Music	Standard, deluxe
India	November 23, 2011	CD, digital download	Universal Music	Standard, deluxe
Brazil	November 29, 2011	CD, digital download	Universal Music	Standard, deluxe
Colombia	December 1, 2011		Universal Music	Standard, deluxe
Indonesia	December 2, 2011	CD	Universal Music	Standard, deluxe
