= Quickie (sexual act) =

Brief or spontaneous episode of sexual activity

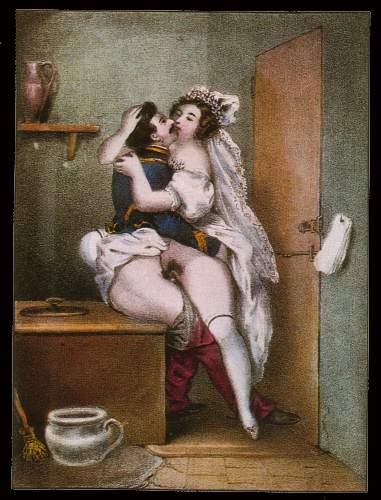
Quickies often do not provide much time for stimulation or the removal of clothing.

A quickie is sexual intercourse that individuals engage in when the time available is minimal. It can arise from a spontaneous sexual desire by the parties involved or be a regular or planned arrangement.

== Description ==
Because of the limit on available time during quickies, foreplay might be skipped and women may not have enough time to lubricate naturally. In a planned encounter, the partners may dress in a manner that reduces the time needed for undressing. For example, a woman may wear a wide skirt or a front closing dress and open crotch lingerie, thongs to be pushed aside or no underwear, especially pantyhose. A man may dispense with a jacket and belt. A quickie between a heterosexual couple may generally satisfy only the man's sexual desire.

Quickies may solve unequal sexual desire in a relationship; however, if they become the only form of sex, with only men getting sexual satisfaction, the relationship may suffer. Author and psychologist Joel Block has suggested that the quickie is a necessary part of a relationship and suggests practical ways for both partners to enjoy the experience.
