= You da One =

2011 single by Rihanna

Single by Rihanna

from the album Talk That Talk
- Released: November 14, 2011
- Recorded: 2011
- Studio: Sofital Paris Le Laubourg, Room 538 (Paris, France); Westlake Recording Studios (Los Angeles, CA)
- Genre: Pop; dancehall; R&B
- Length: 3:21
- Label: Def Jam; SRP
- Songwriters: Ester Dean; Lukasz Gottwald; Robyn Fenty; John Hill; Henry Walter
- Producers: Dr. Luke; Cirkut; Kuk Harrell

Rihanna singles chronology
| "We Found Love" (2011) | "You da One" (2011) | "Talk That Talk" (2012) |

Music video
- "You da One" on YouTube

"You da One" is a song by the Barbadian singer Rihanna recorded for her sixth album, Talk That Talk (2011). It was co-written by Rihanna with Ester Dean, Henry Walter, John Hill and Lukasz Gottwald. Production of the song was completed by Gottwald, under his production name Dr. Luke, and Cirkut. Kuk Harrell and Marcas Tovar recorded the track at the Sofital Paris Le Laubourg, Room 538, and Westlake Recording Studios in Los Angeles, California. It premiered on US radio on November 11, 2011, and was made available to download digitally throughout Europe and Australasia on November 14, 2011. It was added to US Mainstream, rhythmic and urban radio station playlists on November 29, 2011. Throughout December 2011 and January 2012, a remix extended play (EP) was released worldwide.

Musically, "You Da One" is a mid-tempo pop, dancehall and R&B song, which incorporates elements of house, reggae and dubstep. It also features a dubstep bridge before the final chorus. It garnered positive reviews from music critics, many of whom complimented the West Indian and Caribbean tone, and compared it to "What's My Name?" and "Man Down", from her previous studio album Loud (2010). The song achieved moderate chart success; it peaked at number 1 on the US Dance Club Songs and number 14 on the Billboard Hot 100. Internationally, it peaked inside the top 10 in New Zealand and the UK Hip Hop and R&B Singles Chart, and attained top twenty positions in Canada, Hungary, Norway and Sweden.

To promote the song, an accompanying music video was shot in east London and directed by Melina Matsoukas. It was inspired by the 1971 film A Clockwork Orange, and premiered on December 23, 2011. It was mainly shot in black and white, and features Rihanna in a variety of different set ups, such as in a photo shoot and a lyric video game. At various points, lyrics are stamped across the video as Rihanna sings them. Hours after the release of the video, Norwegian photographer Sølve Sundsbø accused Rihanna and Matsoukas of plagiarism, suggesting that the scene featuring the singer wearing a white outfit with black dots was deliberately copied from his 2008 montage "Numero 93".

== Production and release ==
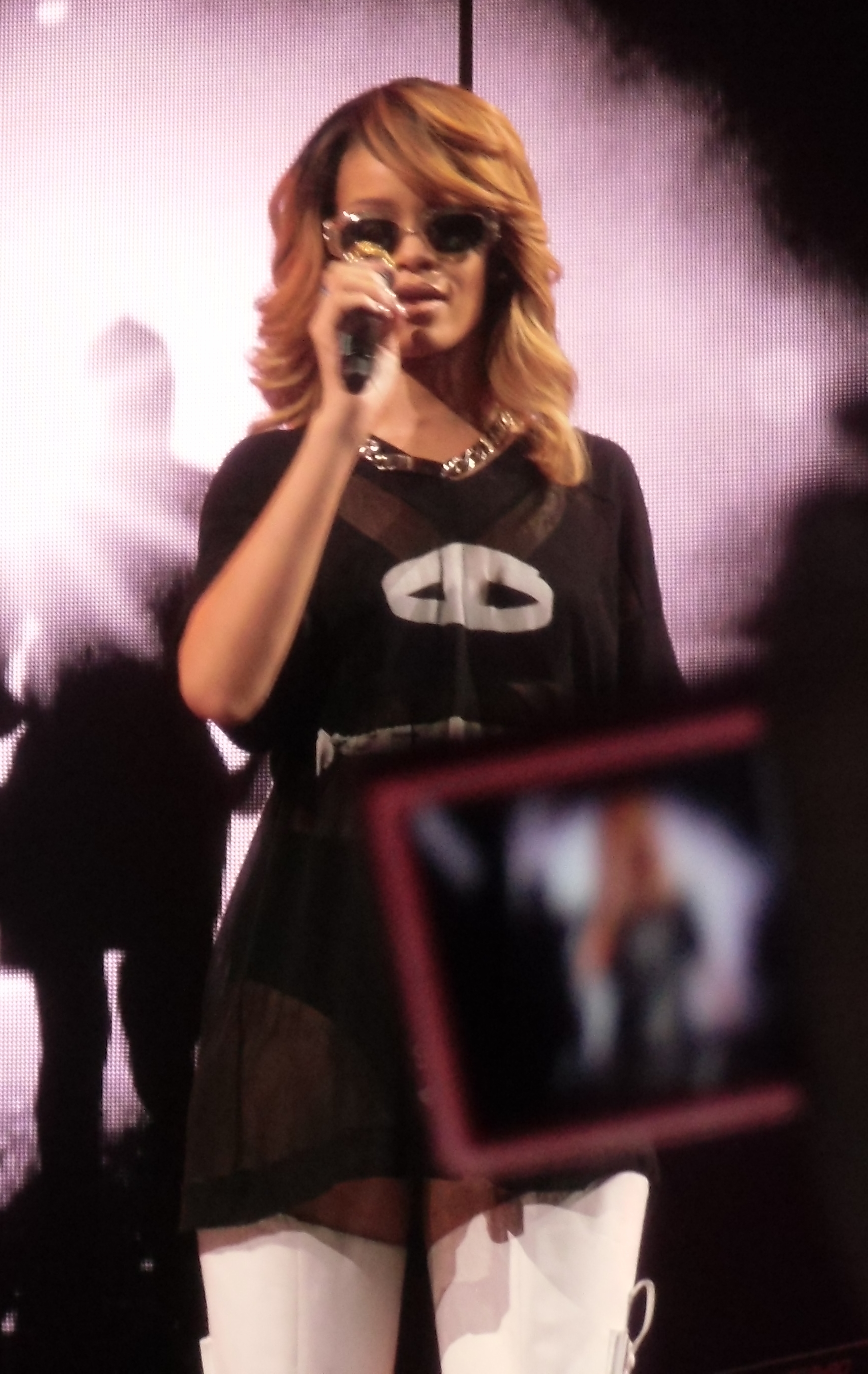
Rihanna performing the song during her 2013 Diamonds World Tour.

"You da One" was written by Ester Dean, Henry Walter, John Hill, Lukasz Gottwald and Rihanna. Production of the song was helmed by Dr. Luke and Cirkut. Rihanna recorded the song at several recording studios around the world during her Loud Tour (2011), which included Sofital Paris Le Laubourg in Room 538 and at Westlake Recording Studios in Studio B in Los Angeles, California. Vocal recording and production was carried out by Kuk Harrell and Marcos Tovar. Alejandro Barajas and Jennifer Rosales served as the vocal recording and production assistants to Harrel and Tovar. "You da One" was mixed by Serban Ghenea and assisted by Phil Seaford, at Mixstar Studios, Virginia Beach, Virginia. John Hanes served as the mixing engineer. The song was engineered by Aubrey “Big Juice” Delaine and Clint Gibbs, and were assisted by Chris Sclafani and Jonathon Steer. All instrumentation was provided by Dr. Luke, Cirkut and Hill, and the production coordinators were Irene Richter and Katie Mitzell.

During an interview with Ryan Seacrest on his radio show On Air with Ryan Seacrest, Rihanna revealed that she found "You da One" to be highly addictive to listen to after she heard the final cut, saying "'You da One' is one of those records that became very addictive for me. I could not stop listening to this song. It's very infectious." The artwork for the single was shot in black-and-white, the same technique which was used for Rihanna's previous single's artwork, "We Found Love". "You da One"'s artwork displays the singer with her head tilted back and her eyes closed holding a cigarette between her lips. It prompted a mixed reaction from Sarah Anne Hughes for The Washington Post; while she noted that Rihanna looks "perfectly coiffed," she criticized the inclusion of the cigarette, and called it a "social taboo."

The song was released as the second single from Talk That Talk, and premièred in the United States nationwide on November 11, 2011, via the Clear Channel Radio station network. "You Da One" was made available to download digitally via iTunes on November 14, 2011, in Australia, New Zealand, South America, the United States and multiple European countries.

== Composition ==
"You da One"
A 17-second sample of "You da One"'s chorus, which features the mid-tempo pop, dancehall and R&B composition.

"You da One" is a pop, dancehall and R&B and reggae song with just a touch of a dubstep groove that embraces Caribbean rhythms, reggae, and pulsing house beats. which incorporates elements of dancehall The song also features a dubstep bridge before the final chorus. "You da One" runs for 3 minutes and 19 seconds, and it was composed in the key of E♭ major using common time and a moderate groove of 126 beats per minute; it follows a chord progression of A♭–Cm–E♭. Instrumentation is provided by a piano. Rihanna's vocal range spans one octave from the low note of B♭_{3} to the high note of B♭_{4} on the song. According to Bradley Stern of MTV, the song's musical structure bore a resemblance to Britney Spears' "Inside Out", writing that Rihanna "gets squeezed between a killer dubstep-to-death breakdown, not unlike the ex-sexin' jam Dr. Luke crafted for Britney's 'Femme Fatale' cut." James Montgomery of the same publication commented on the song's structure, writing that the song "starts in traditional [Rihanna] territory — building on a slow, skanking rhythm — expands with a starbursty chorus, then contracts nearly as quickly on a knotty, ratcheting middle."

The lyrics to "You da One" are about a stable and comfortable relationship, which can be heard in the lyrics "You know how to love me hard / I won't lie, I'm falling hard / Yup, I'm falling for ya, but there's nothing wrong with that." Michael Cragg of The Guardian explained some of the lyrics in the song as part of his review, writing "It's perhaps less immediate, but there's a lovely pre-chorus of 'My love is your love, your love is my love' that leads into a refrain about how great it is to have found someone decent, ('I'm so happy that you came in my life').

== Critical reception ==
"You da One" garnered positive reviews from music critics. In regards to the song's sexually lewd demeanor, Jocelyn Vena of MTV News felt that Rihanna embodied a "potty-mouthed sex kitten"; Vena continued to write that the song is the most radio friendly on Talk That Talk, despite the excessive use of "NSFW lyrics". Robert Copsey for Digital Spy praised the song, writing that it is "bouncy" and is "oozing with Caribbean flavor". The song was also positively reviewed by Sadao Turner of On Air with Ryan Seacrest, who said that "'You da One' is a radio-friendly record with island influence teeming with pop goodness and that signature Rihanna sound that carries across a dancefloor". Amanda Dobbins of Vulture wrote that "You da One" and "We Found Love" are "relatively PG" compared to other songs on Talk That Talk. Entertainment Weekly's Melissa Maerz praised the song, writing that "You da One" is "the perfect opener to set the tone for an album that embraces Caribbean rhythms, reggae, and pulsing house beats." Maerz continued to call the song "an island-breezy tribute to some guy who's got [Rihanna] 'dreaming all the time'." Jason Lipshutz of Billboard magazine noted that the song is similar to some of Rihanna's previous dancehall influenced songs, such as "What's My Name?" and "Man Down", from her previous studio album Loud (2010). Leah Collins of Dose praised the lyrics in the song which she described as "lovey-dovey and most definitely radio-friendly."

Andrew Martin of Prefix Magazine commented on the infectiousness of the song, writing that once it has been listened to, it is hard to stop thinking about it. Martin continued to praise the "sugary sweetness of the song", but criticized the incorporation of the dubstep breakdown toward the end of the song, citing that the reason as to why it was included was to try and make the song "even bigger". Michael Cragg of The Guardian also noted that the song has a relaxed feel to it, and compared it to some of the singer's previous dancehall songs, "What's My Name?" and "Rude Boy". A reviewer for Spin criticized the song, writing "[Rihanna] is giving us a half-limp reggae jam full of platitudes like, '[You da] one I dream about all day'." The reviewer continued to write that there is "more chaste" on "You da One" than there was presented on Britney Spears' guest vocal on "S&M".

== Chart performance ==
=== North America ===
In the United States, "You da One" debuted on the Billboard Hot 100 chart at number 73 on November 16, 2011, two days after it was released to iTunes. The following week, it peaked at number 14. It debuted at number 28 on the US Radio Songs, the apex of its stay, with a first week audience impression of 28 million. With this chart entry, the song became the highest chart position debut since Lady Gaga's "Born This Way", which debuted at number 6 in February 2011. On the US Digital Songs chart, the song debuted and peaked at number 9 with digital download sales of 124,000 units sold. With this chart entry, Rihanna became the first female artist in the history of the chart to have three songs in the top 10 of the Digital Songs Chart; that week, the lead single from Talk That Talk, "We Found Love", was at number 1 with sales of 211,000 units, while her duet with Drake, "Take Care" from album of the same name, was at number 4 with sales of 162,000 units. She became the first artist to have three songs in the top 10 of the chart since Michael Jackson had a record breaking six songs in the top 10 following his death in July 2009.

On the US Mainstream Top 40, "You da One" debuted at number 26 on November 26, 2011, and was awarded the honor of that week's Greatest Gainer, and peaked at number 19. "You da One" achieved the most success on the US Dance Club Songs chart, where it peaked at number 1, and became her seventeenth number 1 song on the chart. With this chart entry, she tied with Beyoncé for the third-most Dance Club Songs chart number 1 songs in the chart's thirty-five-year history. Only Madonna (40) and Janet Jackson (19) have achieved more number 1 songs on the chart. The song also peaked at number 60 on the US Hot R&B/Hip-Hop Songs chart, and number 12 on the Canadian Hot 100. In the United States, "You da One" was certified quadruple Platinum by the Recording Industry Association of America (RIAA) on November 17, 2026, denoting shipments of over four million units.

=== Europe and Australia ===
In France, "You da One" debuted at number 64 on November 19, 2011, and reached a 2011 peak of 28. In its ninth week on the chart, February 14, 2012, the song peaked at number 23; it spent twenty-three weeks on the chart in total. In the Netherlands, "You da One" debuted at number 92 on November 19, 2011, and peaked at number 53 in its third week. It made a re-entry on the chart at number 61 on December 31, 2011, and remained on the chart for a further two weeks in January 2012. Elsewhere in Europe, the song managed to peak inside the top 20 in Ireland at number 12, in Norway at number 16, and in Sweden at number 17. It peaked inside the top 50 in Austria, Switzerland, and Spain. In the United Kingdom, "You da One" debuted on the UK Singles Chart at number 39 on December 3, 2011. The following week, it fell by one position to number 40. In the last week of December 2011, it charted at number 22. In the first week of January 2012, the song reached its peak of number 16. On the UK Hip Hop and R&B Singles Chart, "You da One" debuted at number 11 on December 3, 2011, and reached a 2011 peak of number 6. On January 1, 2012, it peaked at number 5.

In Australia, "You da One" debuted at number 41 on December 14, 2011, and peaked at number 26 in its third week. In 2012, it reached a peak of number 35. In total, it remained on that countries singles chart for a period of ten weeks. It has since been certified triple platinum by Australian Recording Industry Association (ARIA), denoting 210,000 equivalent units. In New Zealand, it debuted at number 22 on November 21, 2011, and peaked at number 10 in its third week. In 2012, it reached a peak of number 27. It remained on the chart for a total of ten weeks.

== Music video ==
=== Background and synopsis ===
Rihanna in a flesh-colored leotard in the music video. This scene was subject of an allegation by Norwegian photographer Sølve Sundsbø who accused Rihanna of plagiarism.

The music video for "You da One" was filmed on November 30, 2011, at MC Motors in Dalston, East London. It was directed by Melina Matsoukas, who also directed the controversial video for her previous single, "We Found Love". In the first images from the London set, Rihanna sported short blonde hair, torn denim shorts, patterned leggings, and a white bowler hat. She held a black cane as she performed scenes in front of a bright pink wall in the visuals inspired by the 1971 film A Clockwork Orange. It premiered on December 23, 2011.

The clip is partly a photo shoot and a lyric video as lyrics are stamped across the screen and Rihanna's body, and was shot mainly in black and white. She wears numerous outfits and blonde wigs throughout the video as she emulates the clothes from A Clockwork Orange by wearing a white bowler hat and cane from Laird Hatters, sporting a smoky eye in homage, and smacking her pink pouty lips with bubble gum. Rihanna later strips down to a flesh-coloured leotard as she writhes on the floor with strategically placed artistic shards of light to create leopard spots and tiger stripes on her skin. Several scenes capture solely her mouth; first with a gold grill covering her bottom row of teeth, and later with smoke billowing from her lips transitioning into and out of the words "Dream" and later "You Da One". Another scene finds Rihanna in a white tank top and tattered jean shorts, swinging a cane in between two brick buildings. She continuously exudes sexuality; in several scenes, she touches and thrusts her crotch (reminiscent of Michael Jackson's dance moves, as noted by Jason Lipshutz of Billboard), struts toward the camera with a pimp cane, endorses provocative dance moves, and drapes herself over a giant ball. Using the latter move, she is found in a black and white chequered background room where she moves around a larger than life playing card. The video ends with Rihanna running away from the camera and jumping into a chair, throwing her legs over the side with a smile on her face.

=== Reception and plagiarism allegations ===
A reviewer for Idolator described the video as "glorious." Amy Sciarretto for PopCrush wrote "Judging from the song's official video, it is, since RiRi can’t keep her hands to herself. The black and white video features the newly blond singer cavorting in an array of black and white outfits, dancing, smiling, giggling and grabbing her crotch with a great degree of regularity." Hours after the release of the video, Norwegian photographer Sølve Sundsbø alleged that the scene of Rihanna wearing a white outfit with black dots shining on her (pictured) is the same as a photo shoot he completed in 2008 titled "Numero 93'". A reviewer for Idolator wrote that "the evidence really doesn’t look to be in Rihanna's favor." The reviewer continued to write "Not only are the projected shapes similar, but both Rihanna and the model are wearing nearly-identical body suits and wigs (though the color differs). Plus, those pink lips providing the only splash of color also look pretty familiar." A reviewer for The Huffington Post concurred with Idolator's observations, and noted "The nakedness, the projections, the interplay of light and shadow... even the haircut" were very similar to that of the work by Sundsbo.

== Track listing ==
- Digital download
1. "You da One" – 3:18
- CD
1. "You da One"
2. "We Found Love" (Chuckie extended remix)
- Digital download (remixes)
1. "You da One" (Dave Audé radio) – 3:53
2. "You da One" (Dave Audé club) – 7:59
3. "You da One" (Dave Audé dub) – 7:29
4. "You da One" (Almighty radio) – 3:46
5. "You da One" (Almighty club) – 6:26
6. "You da One" (Almighty dub) – 6:26
7. "You da One" (Gregor Salto Amsterdam edit) – 2:58
8. "You da One" (Gregor Salto Amsterdam club) – 5:21
9. "You da One" (Gregor Salto Amsterdam dub) – 5:06
10. "You da One" (Gregor Salto Vegas edit) – 2:46
11. "You da One" (Gregor Salto Vegas club) – 4:46
12. "You da One" (Gregor Salto drum dub) – 4:34

== Credits and personnel ==
Recording locations

- Vocal recording – Sofital Paris Le Laubourg, Room 538; Westlake Recording Studios (Studio B), Los Angeles, California.
- Music recording – eightysevenfourteen Studios, Brentwood, California.
- Mixing – Mixstar Studios, Virginia Beach, Virginia.

Personnel

- Songwriting – Ester Dean, Lukasz Gottwald, Robyn Fenty, John Hill, Henry Walter
- Production – Dr. Luke, Cirkut
- Vocal producing and recording – Kuk Harrell, Marcos Tovar
- Assistant vocal recording – Alejandro Barajas, Jennifer Rosales
- Engineer – Aubrey "Big Juice" Delaine and Clint Gibbs
- Assistant engineer – Chris Sclafani, Jonathan Sheer
- Mixing – Serban Ghenea
- Assistant mixing – Phil Seaford
- Engineer for mixing – John Hanes
- All instruments and programming – Dr. Luke, Cirkut, John Hill
- Production coordination – Irene Richter, Katie Mitzell

Credits adapted from the liner notes of Talk That Talk, Def Jam Recordings, SRP Records.

== Charts ==
=== Weekly charts ===
Weekly chart performance
| Chart (2011–2012) | Peak position |
|---|---|
| Australia (ARIA) | 26 |
| Austria (Ö3 Austria Top 40) | 23 |
| Belgium (Ultratop 50 Flanders) | 39 |
| Belgium (Ultratop 50 Wallonia) | 50 |
| Brazil Hot 100 Airplay (Billboard Brasil) | 27 |
| Canada Hot 100 (Billboard) | 12 |
| Croatia International Airplay (HRT) | 5 |
| Czech Republic (IFPI) | 29 |
| Euro Digital Song Sales (Billboard) | 20 |
| France (SNEP) | 23 |
| Hungary (Rádiós Top 40) | 14 |
| Ireland (IRMA) | 12 |
| Italy (FIMI) | 30 |
| Lebanon (The Official Lebanese Top 20) | 14 |
| Netherlands (Dutch Top 40) | 28 |
| Netherlands (Single Top 100) | 53 |
| New Zealand (Recorded Music NZ) | 10 |
| Norway (VG-lista) | 16 |
| Romania (Romanian Top 100) | 16 |
| Scottish Singles Sales (Official Charts) | 15 |
| Slovakia (IFPI) | 16 |
| South Korea (Circle) | 142 |
| Spain (Promusicae) | 44 |
| Sweden (Sverigetopplistan) | 17 |
| Switzerland (Schweizer Hitparade) | 36 |
| UK Singles (Official Charts) | 16 |
| UK Hip Hop/R&B (Official Charts) | 5 |
| US Billboard Hot 100 | 14 |
| US Dance Airplay (Billboard) | 10 |
| US Dance Club Songs (Billboard) | 1 |
| US Hot R&B/Hip-Hop Songs (Billboard) | 60 |
| US Pop Airplay (Billboard) | 19 |
| US Rhythmic Airplay (Billboard) | 11 |

=== Year-end charts ===
Year-end chart performance
| Chart (2012) | Position |
|---|---|
| Canada (Canadian Hot 100) | 60 |
| France (SNEP) | 159 |
| Poland (ZPAV) | 27 |
| UK Singles (OCC) | 176 |
| US Billboard Hot 100 | 89 |
| US Dance Club Songs (Billboard) | 19 |

== Certifications ==
Certifications
| Region | Certification | Certified units/sales |
|---|---|---|
| Australia (ARIA) | 3× Platinum | 210,000^{‡} |
| Brazil (Pro-Música Brasil) | Diamond | 250,000^{‡} |
| New Zealand (RMNZ) | 2× Platinum | 60,000^{‡} |
| Sweden (GLF) | Gold | 20,000^{‡} |
| United Kingdom (BPI) | Gold | 400,000^{‡} |
| United States (RIAA) | 4× Platinum | 4,000,000^{‡} |
Streaming
| Denmark (IFPI Danmark) | Gold | 900,000^{†} |
^{‡} Sales+streaming figures based on certification alone.^{†} Streaming-only figures based on certification alone.

== Release history ==
Release history
| Region | Date | Format(s) | Version | Label | Ref. |
|---|---|---|---|---|---|
| United States | November 11, 2011 | Radio premiere | Original | Def Jam | |
| Argentina | November 14, 2011 | Digital download | Original | Def Jam | |
| Australia | November 14, 2011 | Digital download | Original | Def Jam | |
| Austria | November 14, 2011 | Digital download | Original | Def Jam | |
| Finland | November 14, 2011 | Digital download | Original | Def Jam | |
| France | November 14, 2011 | Digital download | Original | Def Jam | |
| Italy | November 14, 2011 | Digital download | Original | Def Jam | |
| Netherlands | November 14, 2011 | Digital download | Original | Def Jam | |
| New Zealand | November 14, 2011 | Digital download | Original | Def Jam | |
| Norway | November 14, 2011 | Digital download | Original | Def Jam | |
| Portugal | November 14, 2011 | Digital download | Original | Def Jam | |
| Spain | November 14, 2011 | Digital download | Original | Def Jam | |
| Switzerland | November 14, 2011 | Digital download | Original | Def Jam | |
| United States | November 14, 2011 | Digital download | Original | Def Jam | |
| Italy | November 18, 2011 | Radio airplay | Original | Universal | |
| United States | November 29, 2011 | Contemporary hit radio; rhythmic contemporary radio; urban contemporary radio | Original | Def Jam | |
| Belgium | December 21, 2011 | Digital download | Remixes | Def Jam | |
| United Kingdom | December 27, 2011 | CD | 2-track | Universal | |
| United States | January 17, 2012 | Digital download | Remixes | Def Jam | |
| Germany | January 27, 2012 | CD | 2-track | Universal | |

== See also ==
- List of Billboard Dance Club Songs number ones of 2012
