= Cockiness (Love It) =

2012 single by Rihanna and ASAP Rocky

Song by Rihanna

from the album Talk That Talk
- Recorded: September 2011
- Studio: Sofitel Paris Le Faubourg, Room 538
- Genre: Dancehall; dubstep
- Length: 2:58
- Label: Def Jam; SRP
- Songwriters: Candice Pillay; D. Abernathy; Shondrae Crawford; Robyn Fenty
- Producers: Shondrae "Mr. Bangladesh" Crawford; Kuk Harrell

Remix single cover
- Remix featuring ASAP Rocky cover

Rihanna singles chronology
"Where Have You Been" (2012)	"Cockiness (Love It)" (remix)	"Diamonds" (2012)

ASAP Rocky singles chronology
"Goldie" (2012)	"Cockiness (Love It)" (remix) (2012)	"Fuckin' Problems" (2012)

"Cockiness (Love It)" is a song by Barbadian singer Rihanna, from her sixth studio album Talk That Talk (2011). The song was written by Rihanna, Candice Pillay, D. Abernathy and Shondrae Crawford, with production helmed by Mr. Bangladesh. Conceptualized by Mr. Bangladesh, the producer revealed in an interview with MTV that the song had undergone many different versions before the final cut was included on the album. He stated that while he was writing and developing the song, Rihanna was the principal artist whom he wanted to record it.

"Cockiness (Love It)" is a dubstep and dancehall track. Instrumentation is provided by vocal whoops, drums and horns. The lyrics of the song revolve around declaring the singer's desire for sex. "Cockiness (Love It)" received mixed reviews from music critics. Whilst some praised the song's memorability and compositional structure, others criticized its overtly sexual lyrical content. Upon the release of Talk That Talk, the song charted in lower regions on the singles charts in South Korea, the United Kingdom, and the United States.

== Background and conception ==
"Cockiness (Love It)" was written by Candice Pillay, D. Abernathy, Shondrae Crawford and Rihanna, with production helmed by Crawford under his stage name Mr. Bangladesh. In an interview with MTV, Mr. Bangladesh revealed that Rihanna was the principal artist who he wanted to record "Cockiness (Love It)". The producer continued to say that the song had undergone "many different guises" before the final version including on Talk That Talk (2011), saying "'Cockiness', it's layers of things I had sampled for a long time, never really messed with it too much." Mr. Bangladesh continued to describe "Cockiness (Love It)"'s development and song-writing process, saying:

I was in LA, and I had just pulled it out, chopped it up, made it a beat. My artist Candice Pillay, my other writers, Dem Jointz, they wrote the song. It wasn't 'Cockiness' at first, it was something else. They had the 'I love it' part. ... [They] came up with that part first, and that wasn't even on that track. It was just an idea. I was going to make a whole new beat out of it, what they wrote to it that day, it wasn't really all the way done. A couple days later, they revisited it and came up with the 'Cockiness'.

After revealing that the song was finished, Mr. Bangladesh stated that he wanted to wait until the right artist came along to record the song. He later decided that it would be Rihanna, saying, "I was like, 'That's dope. That's Rihanna all day'. They sent the song back, and I finished producing it. I put the 'I love it' on it that they had already had ... She loved it, and that's what it was."

== Composition and lyrics ==
"Cockiness (Love It)"
A 16-second sample of the song's chorus, which features the lyrics "Suck my cockiness, [lick] my persuasion", which Andy Kellman of Allmusic described as Rihanna taking pleasure in being able to tease the listener as she sings in a taunting nature.

As a dubstep and dancehall song, "Cockiness (Love It)" features dancehall stylised vocals and a rap bridge by Rihanna. Claire Suddath of Time Entertainment noted that the speed in which Rihanna delivers her vocal is so fast that it blends in with the composition, which she wrote "becomes the basis for the beat." The instrumentation of "Cockiness (Love It)" consists of vocal whoops, cracking drums and bawling horns.

Throughout the song, Rihanna sings in a taunting nature, taking pleasure in being able to tease the listener. T'Cha Dunlevy of The Montreal Gazette compared Rihanna's "[taunting]" vocals in the lyrics "Suck my cockiness/Lick my persuasion" to the style in which Britney Spears sings on her 2009 single "If U Seek Amy" (Circus, 2008). Jason Lipshutz of Billboard magazine noted that Rihanna's vocals in the lyrics "I love it, I love it, I love it when you eat it" offer "coos" about wanting sex, whilst sarcastically writing that "we're pretty sure she's not talking about the chicken pot pie she left for dinner." James Montgomery of MTV noted that the lyrics "Suck my cockiness/Lick my persuasion", are, in his opinion, the best "come-on" line of 2011 alongside Lady Gaga's "Heavy Metal Lover" (Born This Way, 2011) lyrics "I want your whiskey mouth/All over my blond south".

The song heavily samples the beginning of Greg Kinnear's performance of "Summertime" from the 2003 comedy film Stuck on You.

== Remix ==
"Cockiness (Love It)" was officially remixed featuring a guest appearance from American rapper ASAP Rocky, rapping the first verse. The song was digitally released on September 7, 2012, as the sixth and final single from Talk That Talk. On September 4, 2012, via her Twitter account Rihanna streamed the official remix of "Cockiness (Love It)" through her MTV page. On September 6, 2012, Rihanna and ASAP Rocky performed the remix at the 2012 MTV Video Music Awards in a medley with "We Found Love".

== Critical reception ==
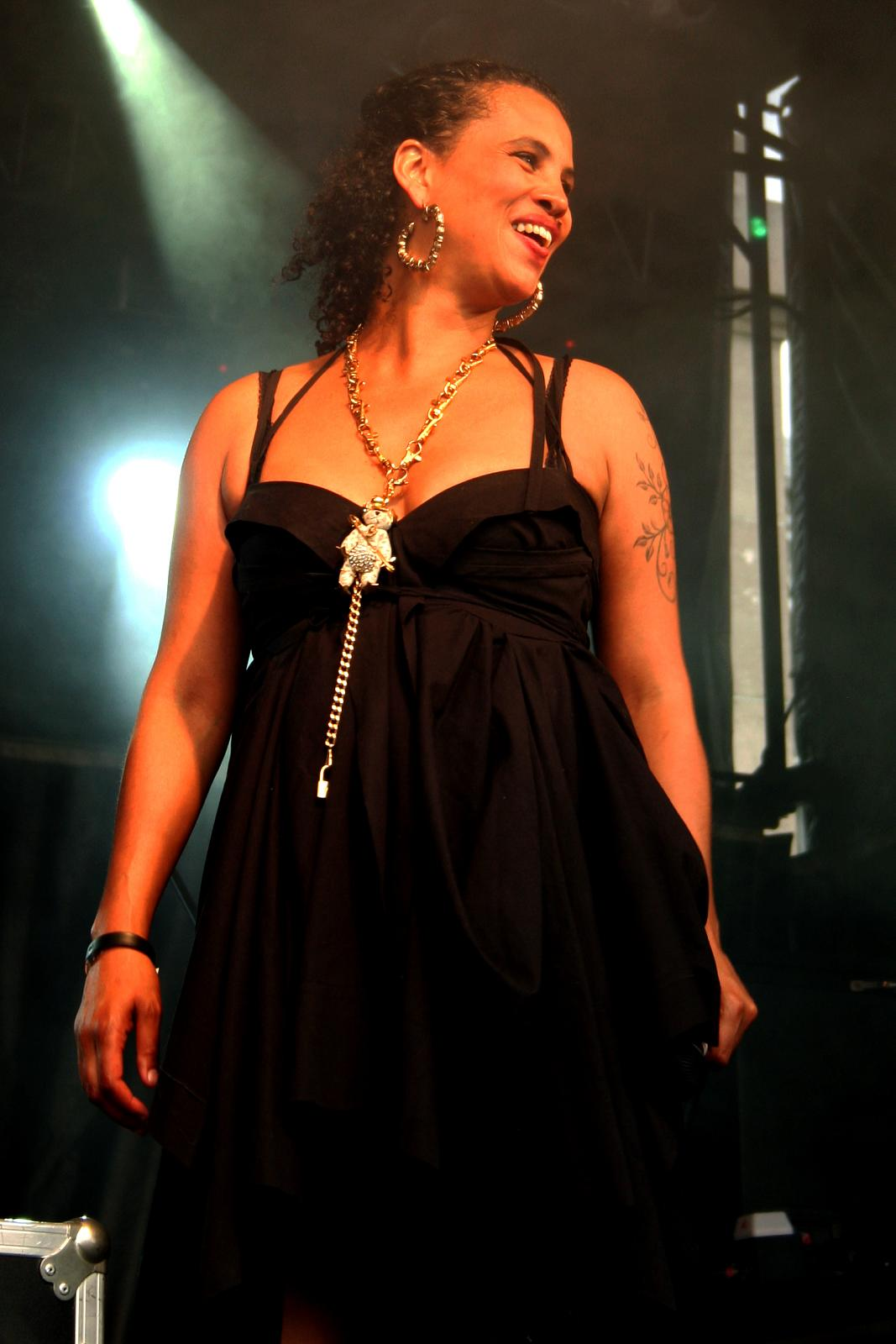
Jon Caramanica of The New York Times wrote that Rihanna appeared to be channelling Swedish singer-songwriter and rapper Neneh Cherry (pictured) on "Cockiness (Love It)" in a "pseudo-melodic" impersonation.

The song received mixed reviews from music critics. Andy Kellman of Allmusic praised the song and its memorability, writing "'Cockiness (Love It),' [is] one of the most hypnotic and wicked beats of the last decade". Priya Elan of NME described the lyrics "Suck my cockiness, [lick] my persuasion" as "cringey", but complimented the song's compositional structure, writing that it provides a "genuine elastic thrill, twisting into all sorts of jaw-dropping musical shapes". Randell Roberts of the Los Angeles Times described "Cockiness (Love It)" and another track from the album, "Birthday Cake", as the "breast and booty" of Talk That Talk but noted that they failed to capture the raunchiness that they set out to achieve. Melissa Maerz of Entertainment Weekly also wrote that "Cockiness (Love It)" and "Birthday Cake" were the most provocative songs on the album, describing them as "I-like-it-rough tracks", but criticized them for being album fillers designed to get the listener out of the bedroom and on to the dance floor.

Jon Caramanica of The New York Times wrote that Rihanna appeared to be channelling Swedish singer-songwriter and rapper Neneh Cherry on "Cockiness (Love It)" in a "pseudo-melodic" impersonation. Caramanica continued to praise the song and called it a "triumph", writing that the singer "[eases] out come-ons as if she were lapping up milk". Despite raising concerns for younger audiences with regard to the song's overt sexual lyrics, a reviewer for Flavour magazine praised Mr. Bangladesh's production on "Cockiness (Love It). Pip Ellwood of Entertainment-Focus noted that "Cockiness (Love It)", along with "Birthday Cake", "leave you under no misunderstanding that Rihanna is as sexual as she's ever been throughout her career." Arwa Haider of Metro wrote that the song is "predictably filthy". Nathan S. of DJ Booth noted that "Cockiness (Love It)" is "by far the album's most explicit offering," and listed the song, along with "Watch n' Learn" as his top two songs from Talk That Talk.

Lindsay Zoladz of Pitchfork was critical of the song, writing "Rihanna's always been singing about sex – she's just never shown such an unfortunate proclivity for cheesy lyrics and dessert metaphors. 'Suck my cockiness/Lick my persuasion,' [Rihanna] commands on the embarrassingly literal 'Cockiness (Love It)', hoping the boldness of the delivery will distract you from thinking about what a clunky line it is (it won't, though Bangladesh's beats might)." Tuyet Nguyen of The A.V. Club commented that although Rihanna evokes a "raunchy" appeal during the verses, he criticized the singer for providing "stony, deadpanned [vocals]." Simon Price of The Independent shared the same opinion as Nguyen with regard to Rihanna's vocal performance, writing, "It's a shame that [Cockiness (Love It)], like every Rihanna vocal, is delivered in a voice which sounds as bored as a sex-line worker filing her nails." Mike Diver for the BBC was critical of the song's inclusion on the album, writing "A forgettable vocal from Jay-Z on the title-track foreshadows an awful exercise in quasi-erotic wordplay on Cockiness (Love It)."

== Chart performance ==
Upon the release of Talk That Talk, "Cockiness (Love It)" debuted on multiple world charts. The song debuted on the South Korea Gaon International Chart at number 62 on November 26, 2011, with sales of 6,918 digital downloads. In the United Kingdom, "Cockiness (Love It)" debuted at number 33 on the UK R&B Chart on November 27, 2011. It also debuted on the UK Singles Chart at number 121 in the chart issue December 3, 2011. In the United States, the song debuted on the US Billboard Bubbling Under Hot 100 Singles chart at number 17 in the chart issue December 10, 2011.

The remix single failed to attain chart success. It peaked at number two on the Bubbling Under Hot 100. The remix has sold 54,000 digital copies in the US.

== Live performance ==
Rihanna performed "Cockiness (Love It)" for the first time at Radio 1's Hackney Weekend on May 24, 2012, as the fourth song on the set list. She also performed the song at the 2012 MTV Video Music Awards which placed on September 6 when she opened the award show alongside her now-husband ASAP Rocky and closed her performance with "We Found Love". The song was later included as part of the setlist on her Diamonds World Tour during the first act.

== Track listing ==
- Album version
1. "Cockiness (Love It)" – 2:58
- Digital remix single
1. "Cockiness (Love It) [Remix]" (featuring ASAP Rocky) – 3:39

== Credits and personnel ==
Recording

- Recorded at Sofitel Paris Le Faubourg, Room 538.

Personnel

- Songwriting – Candice Pillay, D. Abernathy, Shondrae Crawford, Robyn Fenty
- Production, instruments, programming – Shondrae "Bangladesh" Crawford
- Vocal engineering and recording – Kuk Harrell, Marcos Tovar
- Assistant vocal recording – Jennifer Rosales
- Mixing – Fabian Marasciullo
- Assistant mixing – Ghazi Hourani

Credits adapted from the liner notes of Talk That Talk, Def Jam Recordings, SRP Records.

== Charts ==
Chart (2011)	Peak position
South Korea Gaon International Chart	62
UK R&B (Official Charts Company)	33
UK Singles (Official Charts Company)	121
US Bubbling Under Hot 100 Singles (Billboard)	17
US R&B/Hip-hop Digital Songs (Billboard)	26

Chart (2012)	Peak position
Canadian Digital Songs (Billboard)	75
US Bubbling Under Hot 100 (Billboard)	2
US Bubbling Under R&B/Hip-Hop Singles (Billboard)	7
US Hot R&B Songs (Billboard)	18
US R&B/Hip-Hop Digital Songs (Billboard)	10
US Hot Digital Songs (Billboard)	61

== Certifications ==
Region	Certification	Certified units/sales
New Zealand (RMNZ)	Gold	15,000^{‡}
United States (RIAA)	Platinum	1,000,000^{‡}
^{‡} Sales+streaming figures based on certification alone.

== Release history ==
Date	Format	Version	Label	Ref.
September 7, 2012	Digital download	Remix	Def Jam	
