= List of songs recorded by Rihanna =

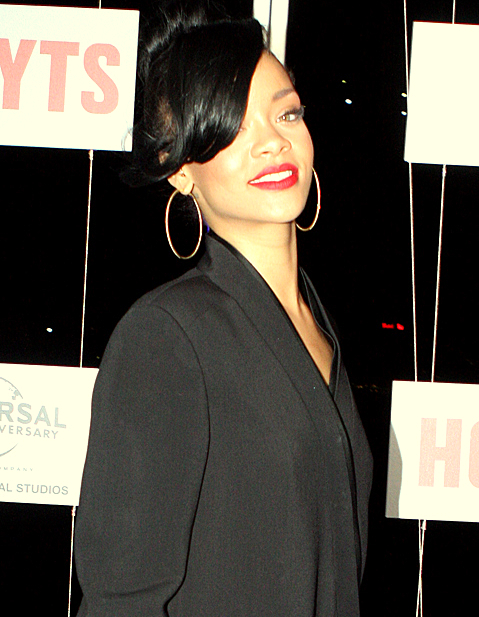
Rihanna in 2012

Barbadian singer Rihanna has recorded music for her eight studio albums and has collaborated with other artists for duets and featured songs on their respective albums, which also includes charity songs. After signing a record contract with the Def Jam Recordings in February 2005, Rihanna began to work with producers Carl Sturken and Evan Rogers, who co-wrote and co-produced 12 out of the 15 songs on her 2005 debut album, Music of the Sun. Award-winning songwriter Diane Warren co-wrote the title track, while Grammy Award-winning singer-songwriter Deniece Williams co-wrote the song "Willing to Wait". Sturken and Rogers co-wrote and co-produced 9 songs out of 16 on Rihanna's 2006 album A Girl Like Me. The album's lead single "SOS" was written by Evan "Kidd" Bogart and J. R. Rotem. It contains a sped-up sample of "Tainted Love", written in 1965 by Ed Cobb, who was credited as a co-writer on "SOS".

Rihanna's third studio album Good Girl Gone Bad was developed by songwriters and producers with whom she had previously collaborated as well as different artists. Sturken and Rogers co-wrote and co-produced 2 songs out of 13. Different writers and producers, including Christopher "Tricky" Stewart, Timbaland and Norwegian production team Stargate (Tor Erik Hermansen and Mikkel S. Eriksen) significantly contributed to the album, writing and producing a total of nine songs between them. "Don't Stop the Music", the third single to be released from Good Girl Gone Bad, contains a sample of Michael Jackson's "Wanna Be Startin' Somethin'" and attributes to Jackson as a co-writer. The album was re-released in 2008 and featured new songs written by then-boyfriend Chris Brown and Maroon 5. Rated R, Rihanna's fourth studio album, presented a new creative direction for the singer. Ne-Yo, "Tricky" Stewart, Hermansen and Eriksen produced tracks for the album, as well as Chase & Status and Justin Timberlake. The lyrical content cast an ominous, dark and foreboding tone over Rated R, which critics noted as a step away from her more care-free persona of past albums.

Rihanna's fifth studio album Loud saw the singer return to her dancehall roots. Stargate composed three tracks for the album—"Only Girl (In the World)", "What's My Name?" and "S&M". Fellow Barbadian singer-songwriter Shontelle co-wrote the reggae-infused song "Man Down". The singer's sixth studio album in as many years, Talk That Talk, incorporated predominantly R&B songs. Tracks were produced by Calvin Harris, Dr. Luke and Stargate. The album's lead single "We Found Love" was written and produced solely by Harris. Dr. Luke co-wrote and co-produced three songs for the album: "You da One", "Where Have You Been" and "Fool in Love". The lead single from Rihanna's seventh studio album, Unapologetic, is entitled "Diamonds".

== Songs ==
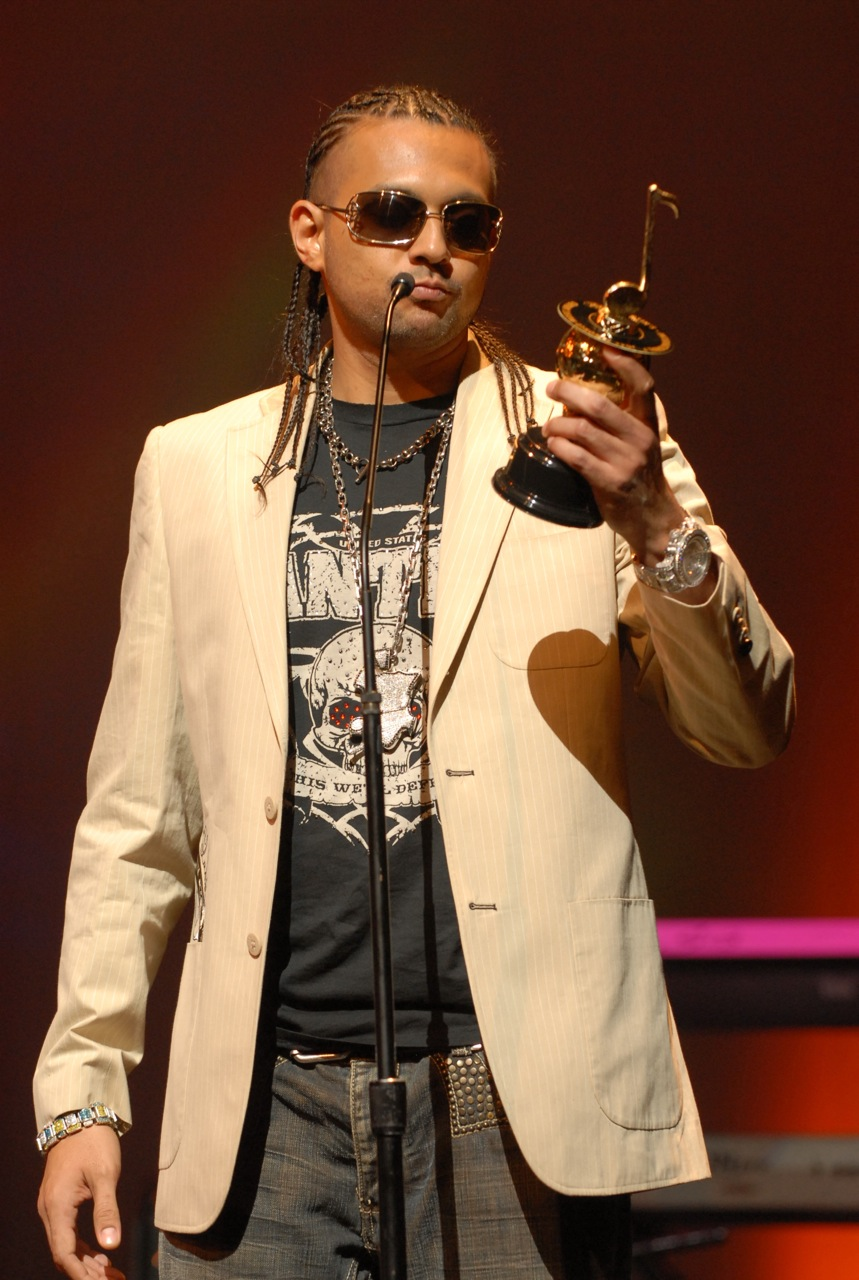
Sean Paul co-wrote "Break It Off" and appeared as a featured vocalist.

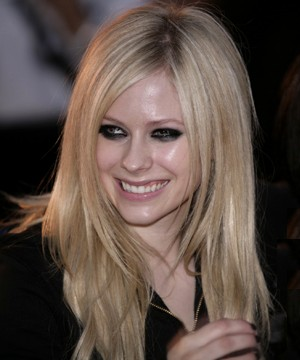
"Cheers (Drink to That)" interpolates Avril Lavigne's song "I'm with You". Due to the interpolation, Lavigne received co-writing credits.

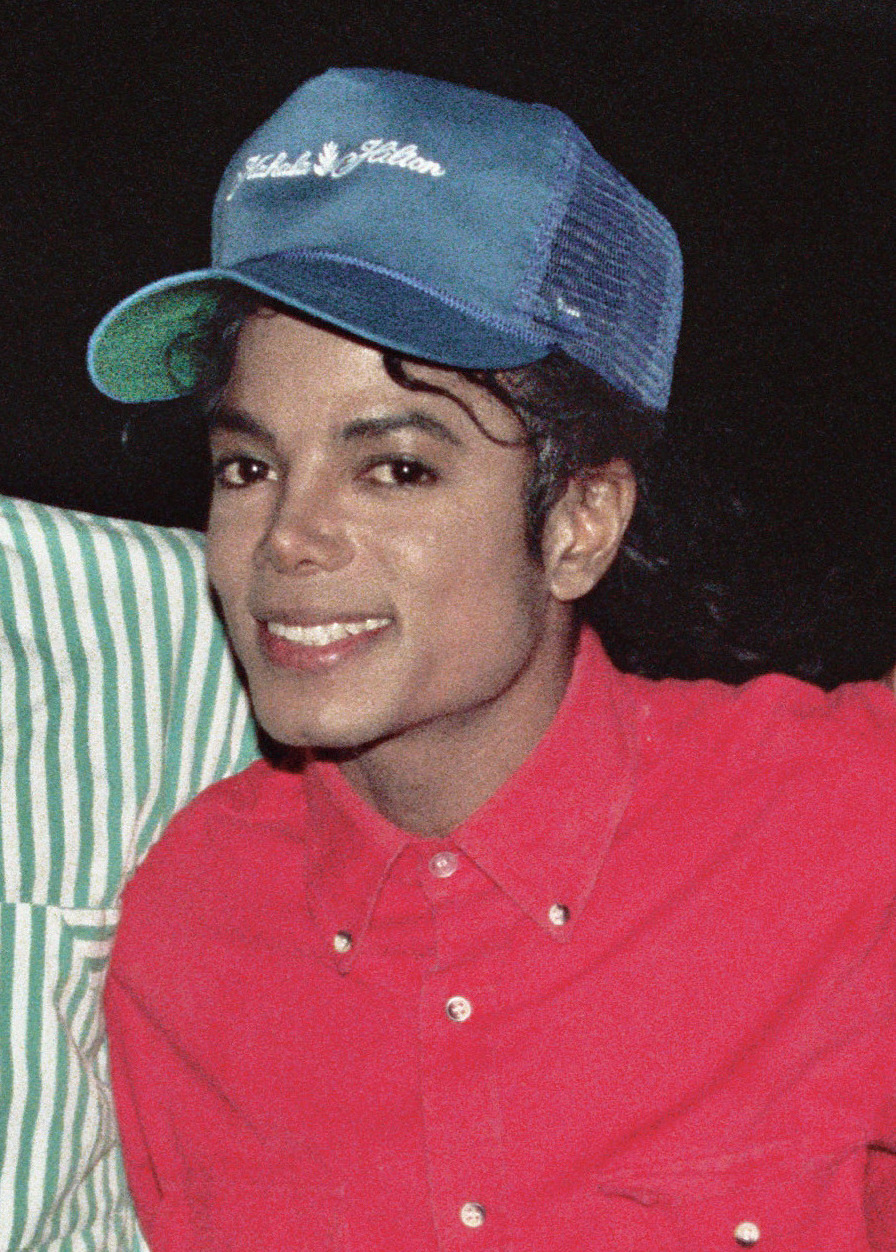
"Don't Stop the Music" contains a sample of Michael Jackson's song "Wanna Be Startin' Somethin'". Due to the inclusion of the sample, Jackson received co-writing credits.

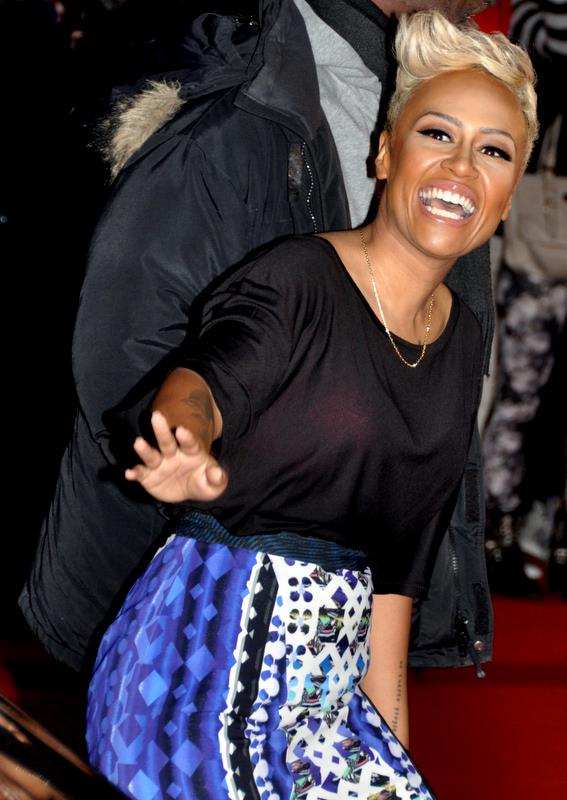
"Half of Me" (from Unapologetic) was written by British singer-songwriter Emeli Sandé.

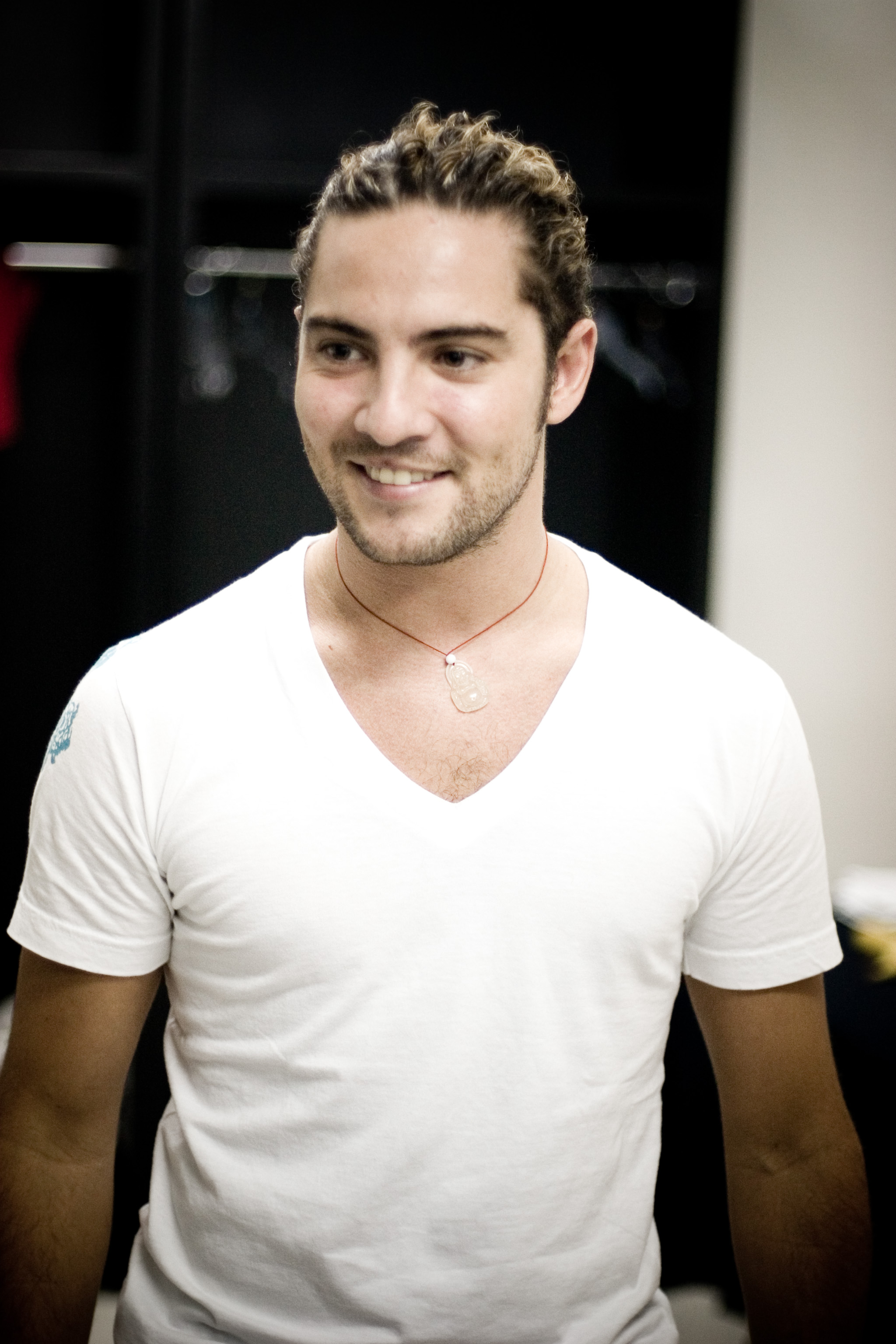
Spanish pop singer David Bisbal features on the Spanglish version of "Hate That I Love You". The song was included on the re-release of Rihanna's Good Girl Gone Bad in 2008.

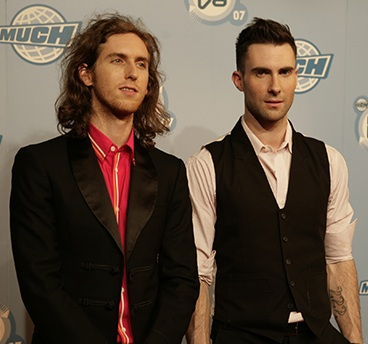
Adam Levine (pictured, right) and James Valentine (pictured, left) of Maroon 5 co-wrote "If I Never See Your Face Again", on which Rihanna appeared as a featured vocalist.

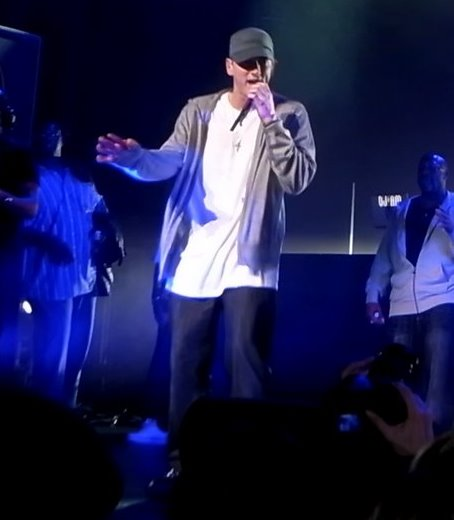
Eminem co-wrote both "Love the Way You Lie" and its sequel.

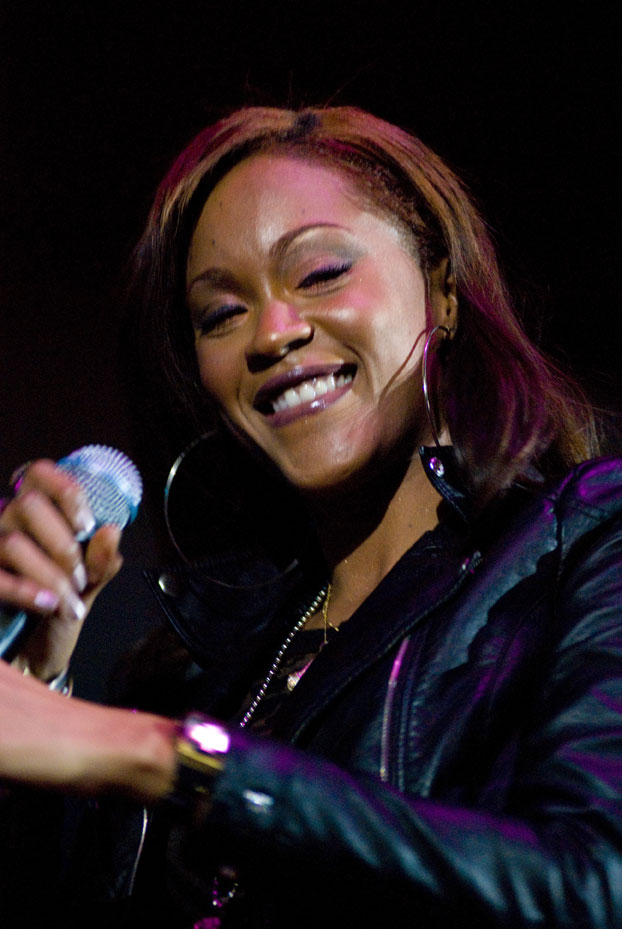
Barbadian singer-songwriter Shontelle co-wrote the reggae-infused song "Man Down".

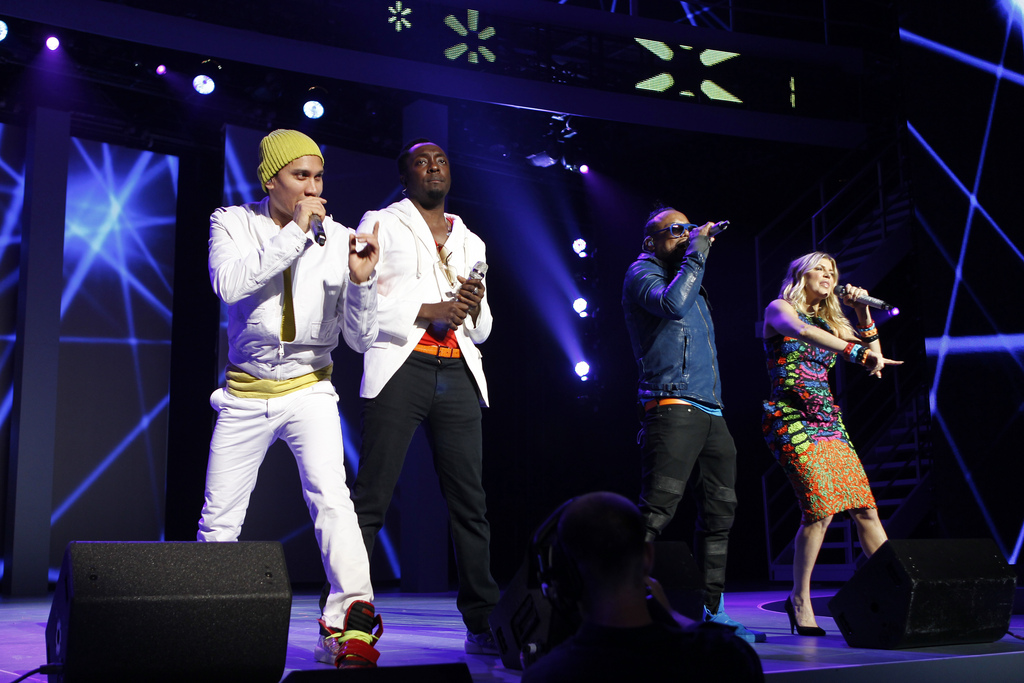
apl.de.ap (pictured, centre right) and will.i.am (pictured, centre left) of The Black Eyed Peas co-wrote "Photographs", while will.i.am appeared as a featured vocalist.

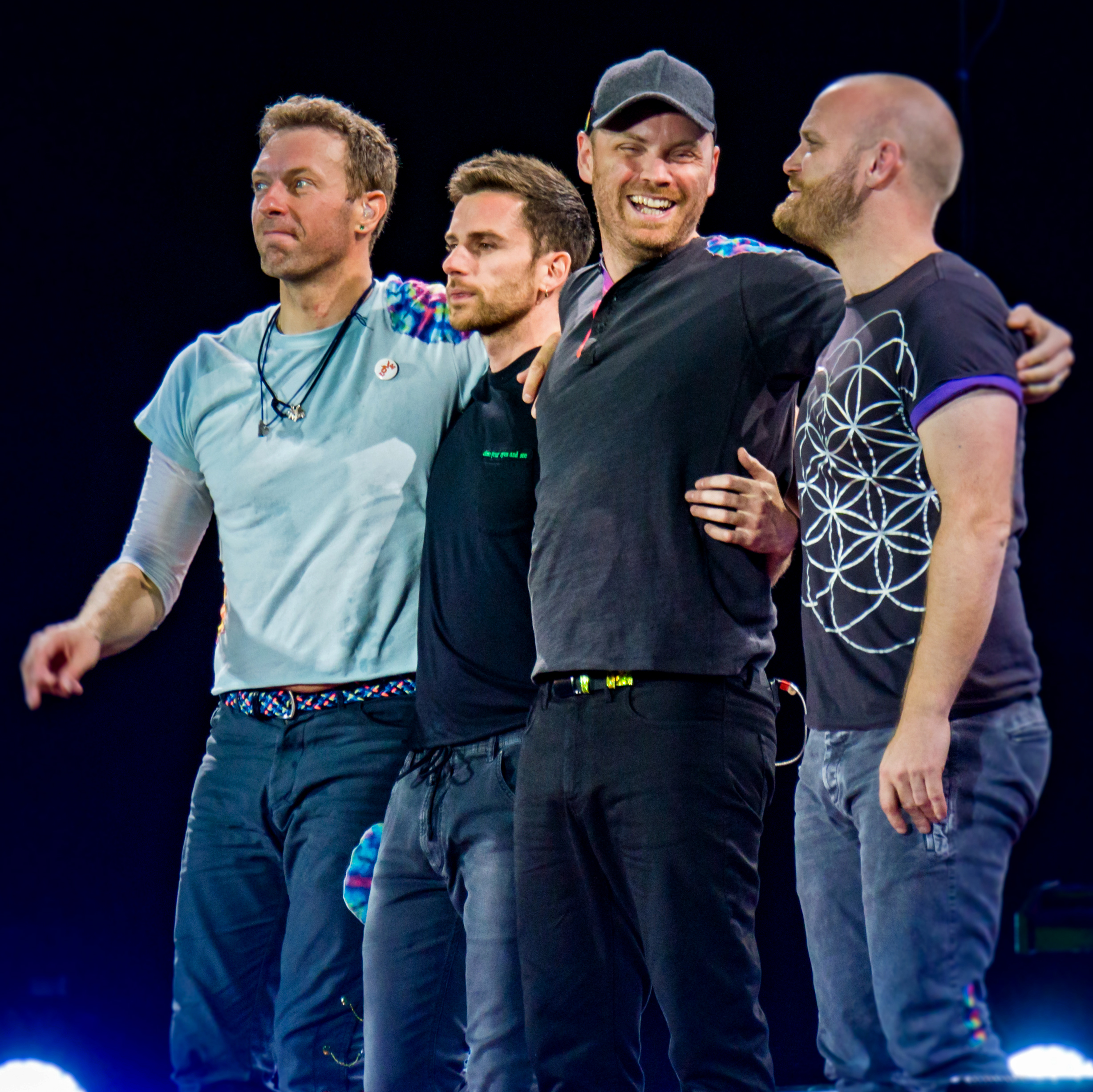
All four bandmates of Coldplay wrote "Princess of China", on which Rihanna appears as a featured vocalist. Additional songwriting was carried out by Brian Eno.

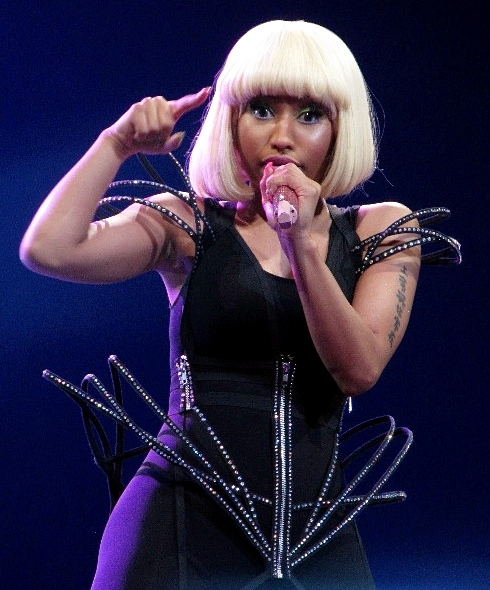
Nicki Minaj wrote her rap verse on the song "Raining Men", on which she appeared as a featured vocalist. Minaj is credited as a songwriter under her birth name Onika Maraj.

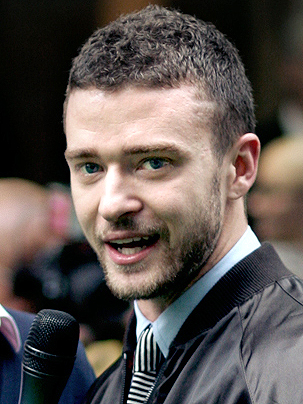
Justin Timberlake co-wrote the song "Rehab" and contributed backing vocals.

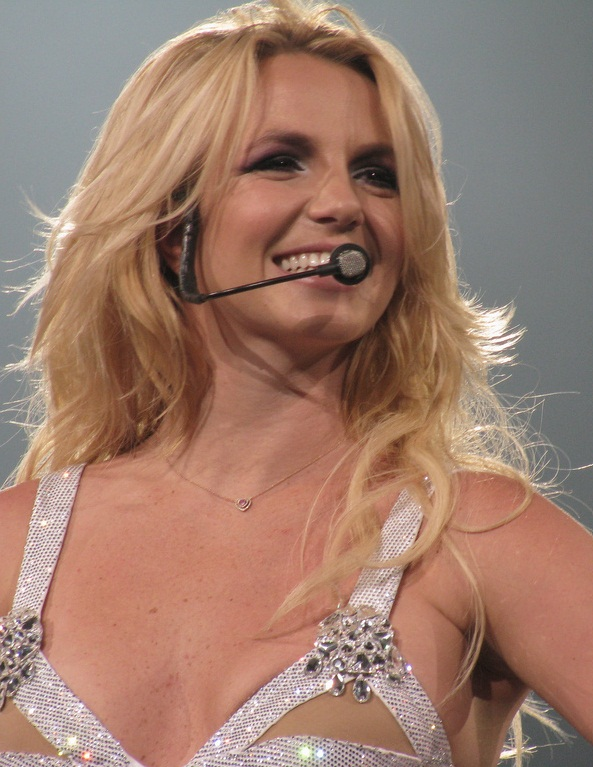
The remix version of "S&M" features guest vocals by American recording artist Britney Spears.

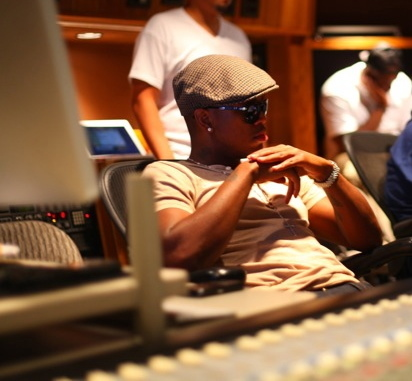
Ne-Yo co-wrote "Stupid in Love" along with production duo Stargate. Many music critics cited the song as a reference to Rihanna and former boyfriend Chris Brown's altercation on the evening of the 2009 Grammy Awards. However, the songwriter later revealed that the song was written two days before the event.

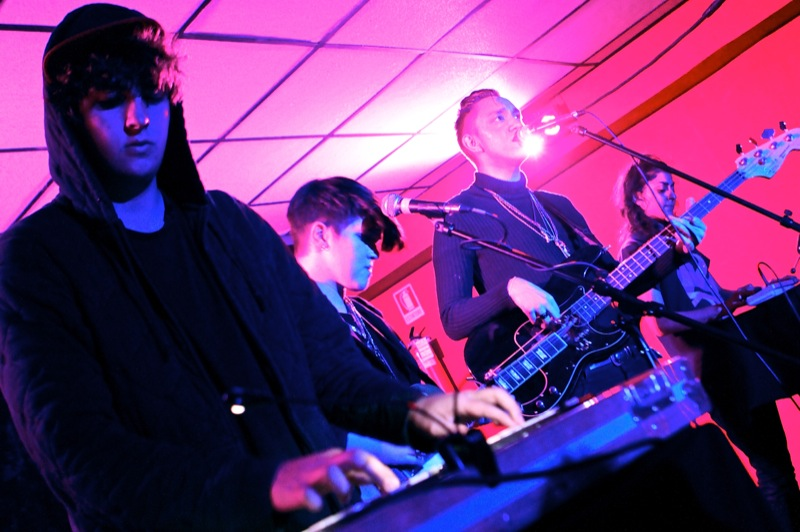
Jamie xx (pictured, far left) of The xx contributed to the songwriting process of Drake's "Take Care", on which Rihanna appears as a featured vocalist.

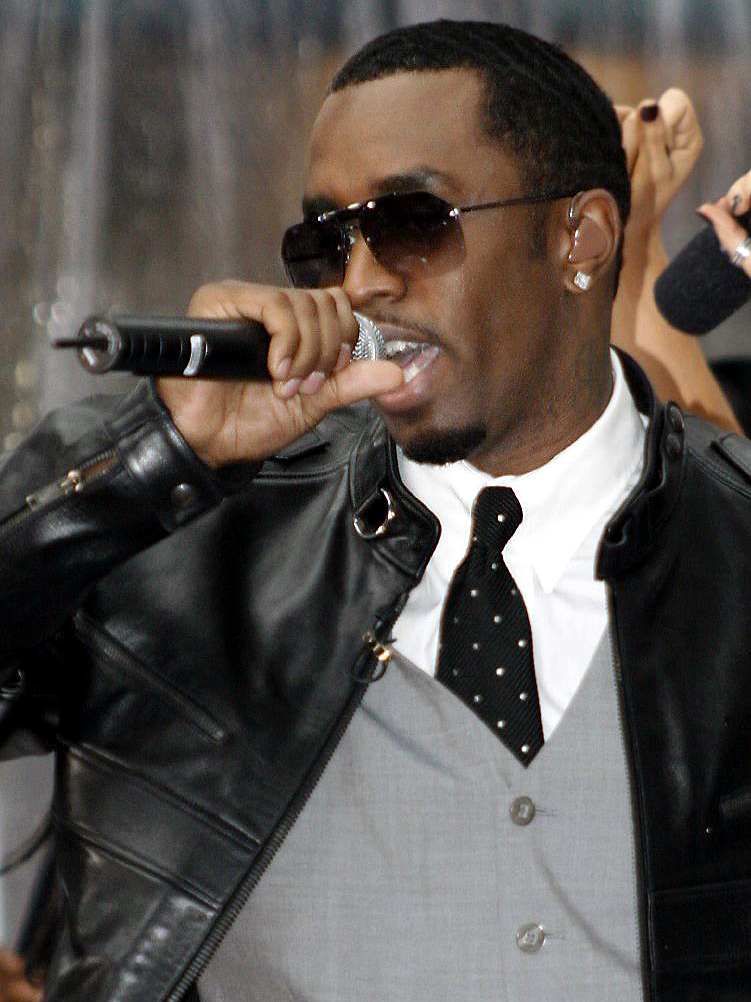
Sean Combs co-wrote Rihanna's "Talk That Talk", which features Jay-Z as a guest vocalist.

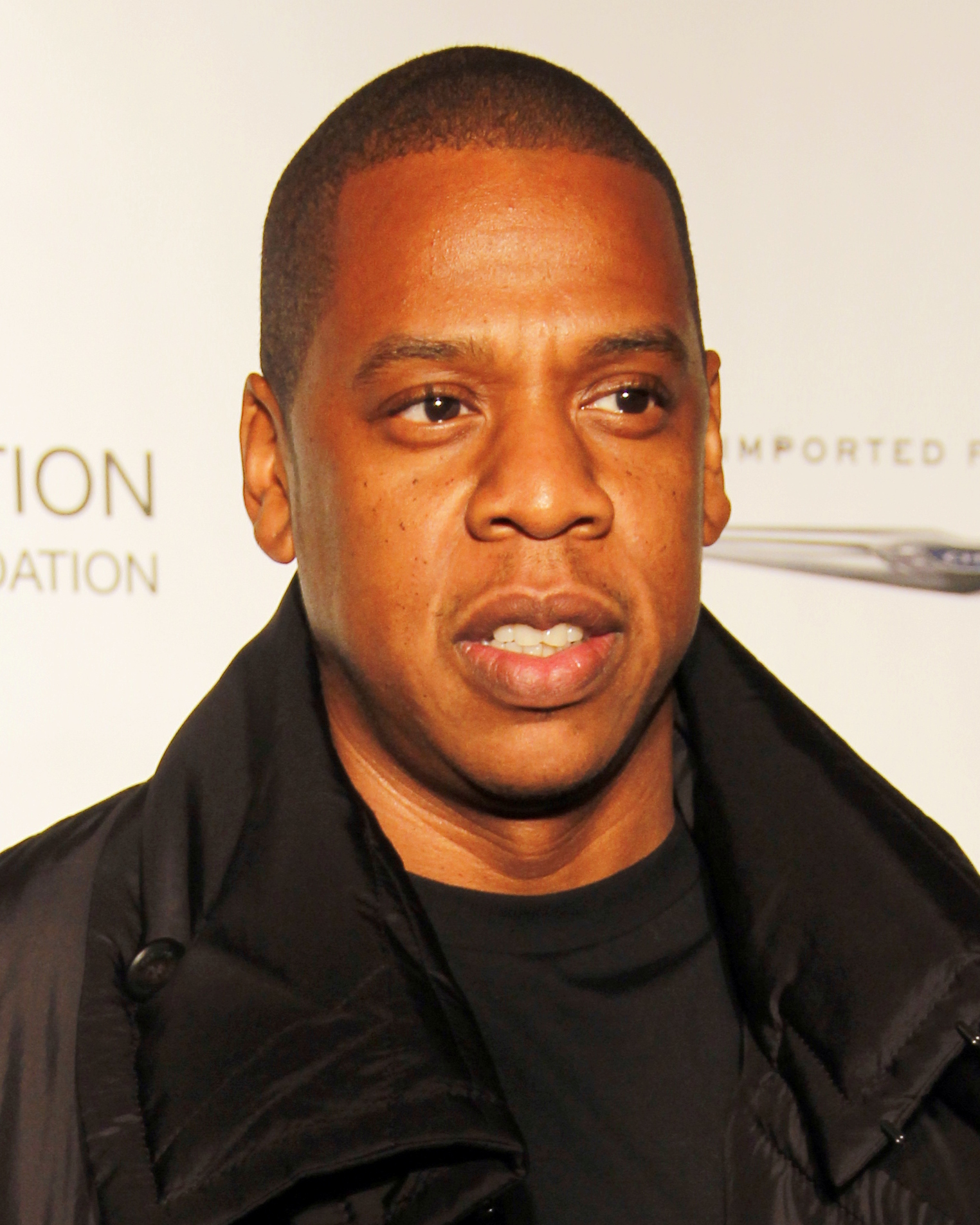
Rapper Jay-Z wrote several songs which he worked with Rihanna. Namely, "Umbrella", "Run This Town" and "Talk That Talk".

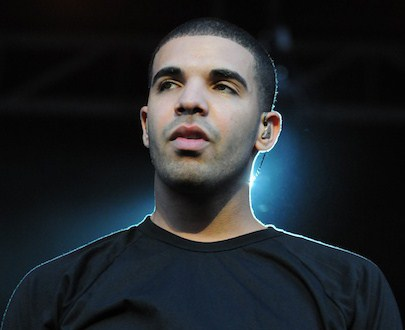
Drake co-wrote "What's My Name?", on which he appears as a featured vocalist.

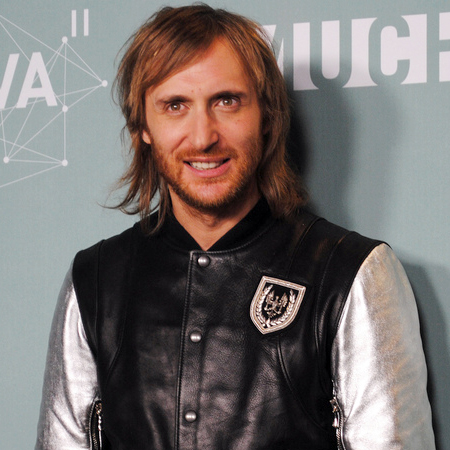
David Guetta co-wrote "Right Now" and "Who's That Chick?", where Rihanna is a featured artist.

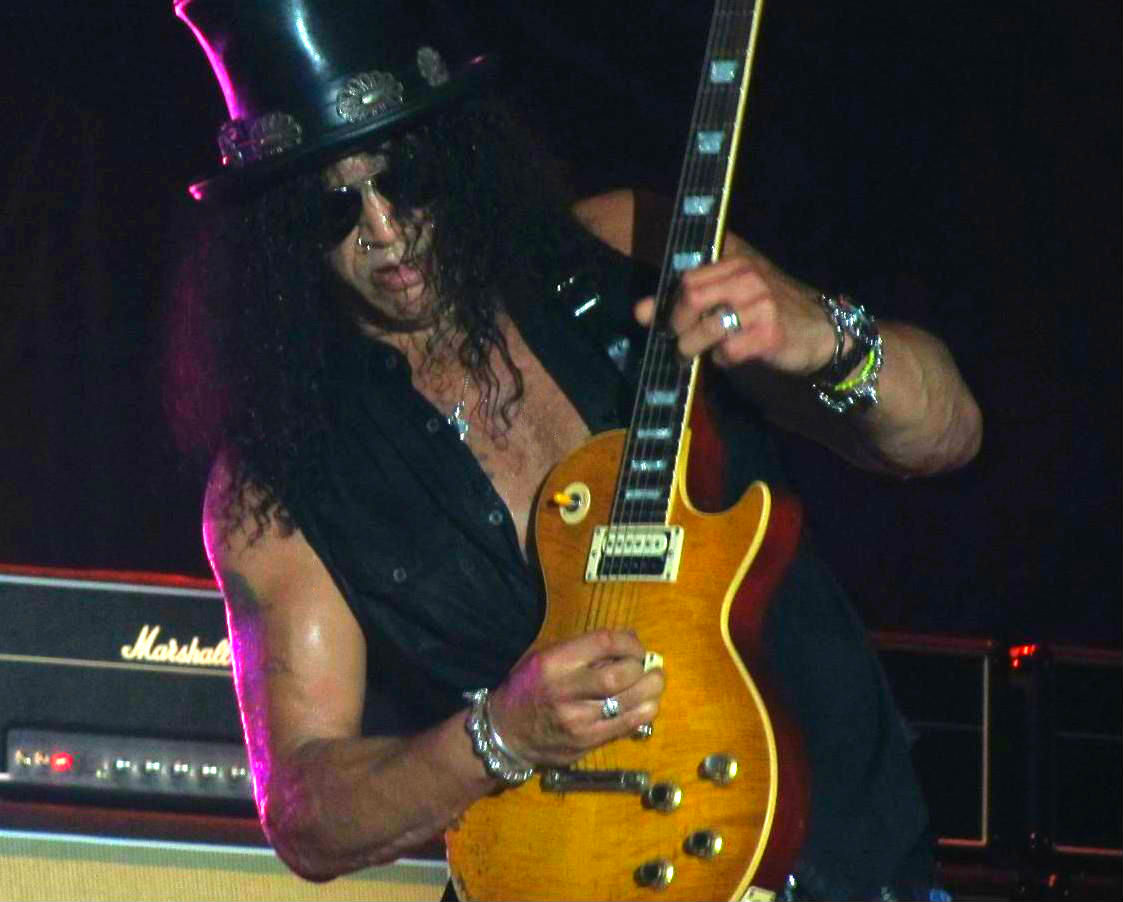
Guitarist Slash made a guest appearance on "Rockstar 101".

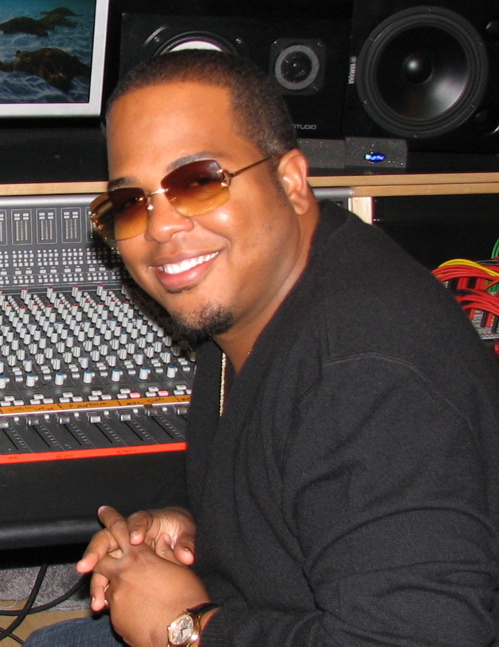
Producer Tricky Stewart co-wrote and produced several of Rihanna's songs since her album, Good Girl Gone Bad, including the hit singles "Umbrella" and "Hard".

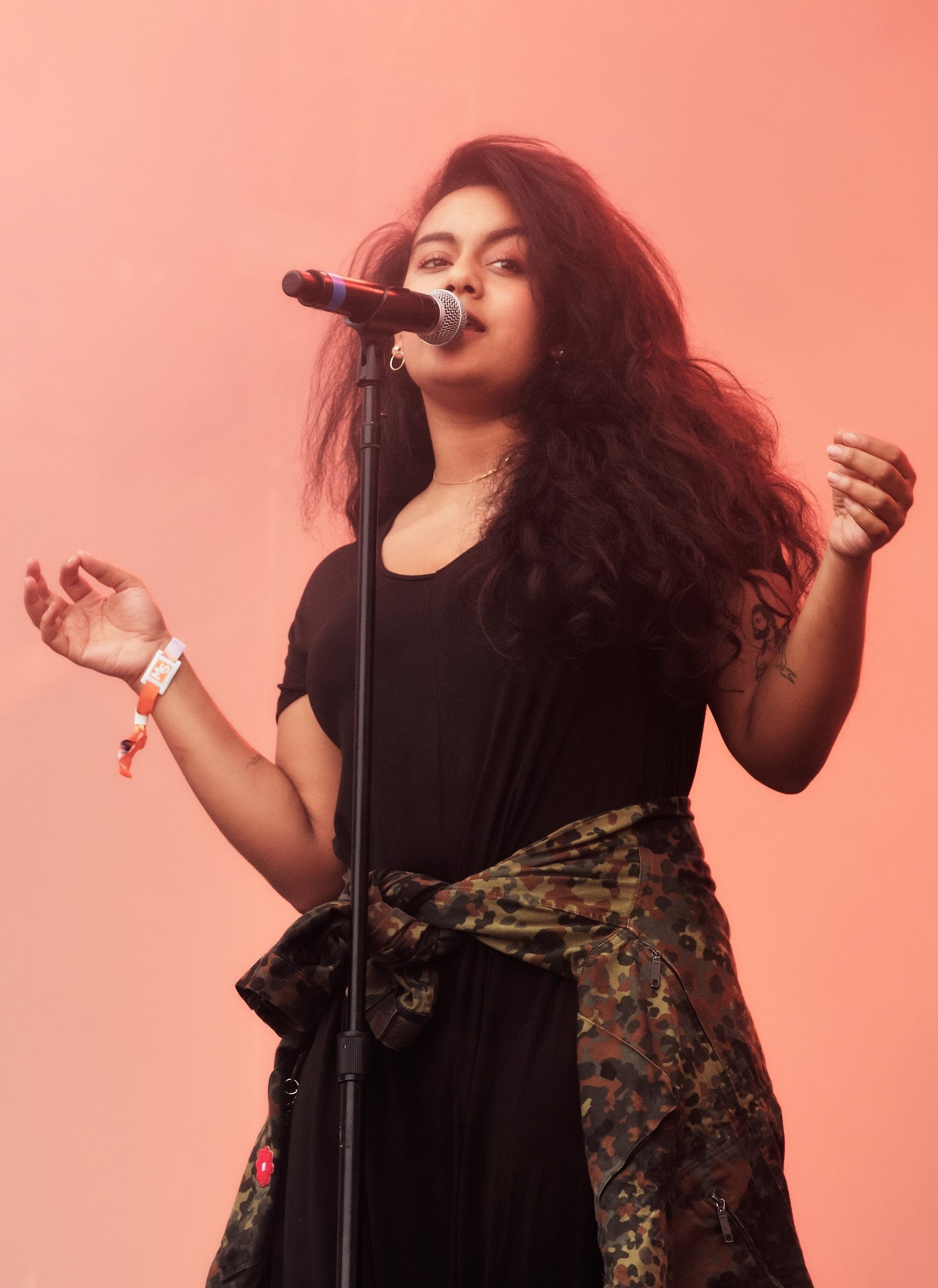
German singer-songwriter Bibi Bourelly co-wrote several songs on Anti, as well as the hit single "Bitch Better Have My Money."

Song	Writer(s)	Album(s)	Year	Ref.
"All of the Lights" Kanye West featuring Rihanna and Kid Cudi	Kanye West; Jeff Bhasker; Malik Yusef; Warren Trotter; Stacy Ferguson; Scott Mescudi	My Beautiful Dark Twisted Fantasy	2010	
"American Oxygen"	Alexander Grant; Candice Pillay; X Ambassadors; Robyn Fenty	Non-album single	2015	
"As Real as You and Me"	Rodney "Darkchild" Jerkins; Alicia Renee Williams; Robyn Fenty	Home	2015	
"Bad (Remix)" Wale featuring Rihanna	Olubowale Akintimehin; Tiara Thomas; Kelson Camp	The Gifted	2013	
"Bad Girl" Rihanna featuring Chris Brown	Chris Brown; Darnell Dalton; Eric Florence; Ester Dean; Jamal Jones; Lamar Raynard Taylor	Confessions of a Shopaholic	2009	
"Believe It" PartyNextDoor featuring Rihanna	Jahron Brathwaite; Robyn Fenty; Andre Robertson; Carl McCormick; Eric Dugar; David Hughes; Desma Triplett	Partymobile	2020	
"Birthday Cake"	Ernest Clark; Marcos Palacios; Robyn Fenty; Terius Nash	Talk That Talk	2011	
"Bitch Better Have My Money"	Jamille Pierre; Bibi Bourelly; Robyn Fenty; Travis Scott	Non-album single	2015	
"Boom Boom" Cham featuring Rihanna	Damian Beckett; Dave Kelly	Ghetto Story	2006	
"Born Again"	Robyn Fenty; James Fauntleroy; Ludwig Göransson; Terius Nash	Black Panther: Wakanda Forever – Music From and Inspired By	2022	
"Break It Off" Rihanna featuring Sean Paul	Donovan Bennett; K. Ford; Robyn Fenty; Sean Paul	A Girl like Me	2006	
"Breakin' Dishes"	Christopher "Tricky" Stewart; Terius Nash	Good Girl Gone Bad	2007	
"California King Bed"	Alex Delicata; Andrew Harr; Jermaine Jackson; Priscilla Renea; Robyn Fenty	Loud	2010	
"Can't Remember to Forget You" Shakira featuring Rihanna	John Hill; Tom Hull; Daniel Alexander; Erik Hassle; Shakira; Robyn Fenty	Shakira	2014	
"Cheers (Drink to That)"	Andrew Harr; Avril Lavigne; Chris Ivery; Corey Gibson; Graham Edwards; Jermaine Jackson; Laura Pergolizzi; Lauren Christy; Scott Spock; Stacy Barthe; Robyn Fenty	Loud	2010	
"A Child Is Born"	Stephen Vincent Benét	Now That's What I Call Christmas! 4	2010	
"Close to You"	Brian Kennedy Seals; James Fauntleroy II; Robyn Fenty	Anti	2016	
"Cockiness (Love It)"	Candice Pillay; Dwayne Abernathy; Robyn Fenty; Shondrae Crawford	Talk That Talk	2011	
"Cold Case Love"	James Fauntleroy II; Justin Timberlake; Robin Tadross	Rated R	2009	
"Complicated"	Ester Dean; Christopher "Tricky" Stewart	Loud	2010	
"Consideration" Rihanna featuring SZA	Solana Rowe; Tyran Donaldson; Robyn Fenty	Anti	2016	
"Coulda Been the One"	Carl Sturken; Evan Rogers	A Girl Like Me (bonus track)	2006	
"Counterfeit" Chris Brown featuring Rihanna, Kelly Rowland & Wiz Khalifa	Sevyn Streeter; Wiz Khalifa; Chris Brown	Before The Party	2015	
"Crazy Little Thing Called Love" Rihanna featuring J-Status	Andrew Barwise; Andrew Thompson; Byron Barwise; Carl Sturken; Dale "Dizzle" Virgo; Evan Rogers; Oraine Stewart	A Girl Like Me	2006	
"Cry"	Frankie Storm; Mikkel Storleer Eriksen; Tor Erik Hermansen	Good Girl Gone Bad (bonus track)	2007	
"Dancing in the Dark"	Mikkel Storleer Eriksen; Tor Erik Hermansen; Ester Dean; Maureen Anne McDonald; Robyn Fenty	Home	2015	
"Dem Haters" Rihanna featuring Dwane Husbands	Aion Clarke; Carl Sturken; Evan Rogers; Melanie Hallim; Michael Flowers; Vincent Morgan	A Girl Like Me	2006	
"Desperado"	Krystin "Rook Monroe" Watkins; Mick Schultz; Robyn Fenty; James Fauntleroy; Derrus Rachel	Anti	2016	
"Diamonds"	Benjamin Levin; Mikkel Storleer Eriksen; Sia Furler; Tor Erik Hermansen	Unapologetic	2012	
"Disturbia"	Andre Merritt; Brian Kennedy; Robert Allen; Chris Brown	Good Girl Gone Bad: Reloaded	2008	
"Do Ya Thang"	Robyn Fenty; Terius Nash	Talk That Talk (bonus track)	2011	
"Don't Stop the Music"	Michael Jackson; Mikkel Storleer Eriksen; Tawanna Dabney; Tor Erik Hermansen	Good Girl Gone Bad	2007	
"Drop That"	Jacob Plant; Robyn Fenty	Home	2015	
"Drunk on Love"	Baria Qureshi; Ester Dean; Jamie Smith; Mikkel S. Eriksen; Oliver Sim; Romy Madley Croft; Tor Erik Hermansen	Talk That Talk	2011	
"Fading"	Quintin Amey; Darnell Dalton; Lamar Taylor; William Hodge Jr; Alex Gazaway; Jamal Jones	Loud	2010	
"Famous" Kanye West featuring Rihanna	Kanye West; Cydel Young; Kejuan Muchita; Noah Goldstein; Andrew Dawson; Michael Dean; Chancellor Bennett; Kasseem Dean; Ernest Brown; Ross Birchard; Pat Reynolds	The Life of Pablo	2016	
"Farewell"	Ester Dean; Alexander Grant	Talk That Talk	2011	
"Final Goodbye"	Charlene Gilliam; Curtis Richardson; Luke McMaster	A Girl Like Me	2006	
"Fire Bomb"	Brian Kennedy; James Fauntleroy II; Robyn Fenty	Rated R	2009	
"First Time" Fabolous featuring Rihanna	John Jackson; Derryck Thornton; Trina Powell	From Nothin' to Somethin'	2007	
"Fly" Nicki Minaj featuring Rihanna	Clemm Rishad; Jonathan Rotem; Kevin "Boonn" Hissink; Onika Maraj; William Jordan	Pink Friday	2010	
"Fool in Love"	Ester Dean; Henry Walter; Lukasz Gottwald	Talk That Talk (bonus track)	2011	
"FourFiveSeconds" Rihanna, Kanye West and Paul McCartney	Kanye West; Paul McCartney; Kirby Lauryen; Mike Dean; Ty Dolla Sign; Dave Longstreth; Dallas Austin; Elon Rutberg; Noah Goldstein; Robyn Fenty	Non-album single	2015	
"Friend of Mine"	Robyn Fenty; Lee Stashenko; Jon Bellion; Pete Nappi; Elijah Noll; Jason Cornet; Paul Omar Elkan Agyei	Smurfs Movie Soundtrack (Music From & Inspired By)	2025	
"G4L"	Saul Milton; James Fauntleroy II; Robyn Fenty; Will Kennard	Rated R	2009	
"Get It Over With"	Brian Seals; James Fauntleroy	Unapologetic	2012	
"A Girl like Me"	Carl Sturken; Evan Rogers; Robyn Fenty	A Girl Like Me	2006	
"Good Girl Gone Bad"	Lene Marlin; Mikkel S. Eriksen; Shaffer Smith; Tor Erik Hermansen	Good Girl Gone Bad	2007	
"Goodnight Gotham"	Paul Epworth; Florence Welch; Robyn Fenty; Christian Keyon Boggs Jr	Anti (bonus track)	2016	
"Half of Me"	Emeli Sandé; Mikkel S. Eriksen; Shahid Khan; Tor Erik Hermansen	Unapologetic (bonus track)	2012	
"Hard" Rihanna featuring Jeezy	Christopher "Tricky" Stewart; Jay Jenkins; Terius Nash; Robyn Fenty	Rated R	2009	
"Hate That I Love You" Rihanna featuring Ne-Yo	Mikkel S. Eriksen; Shaffer Smith; Tor Erik Hermansen	Good Girl Gone Bad	2007	
"Hate That I Love You" (Spanglish version) Rihanna featuring David Bisbal	Mikkel S. Eriksen; Shaffer Smith; Tor Erik Hermansen	Good Girl Gone Bad: Reloaded	2008	
"Haunted"	Carl Sturken; Evan Rogers	Good Girl Gone Bad (bonus track)	2007	
"Here I Go Again" Rihanna featuring J-Status	Carl Sturken; Evan Rogers; J-Status; Robyn Fenty	Music of the Sun	2005	
"Higher"	Ernest Wilson; Bibi Bourelly; Robyn Fenty; James Fauntleroy II; Jerry Butler; Kenny Gamble; Leon Huff	Anti	2016	
"Hole in My Head" Rihanna featuring Justin Timberlake	James Fauntleroy II; Justin Timberlake; Robyn Fenty	Rated R (bonus track)	2009	
"The Hotness" Rihanna featuring Shontelle	Carl Sturken; Evan Rogers; Alisha Brooks; Shontelle Layne	Save the Last Dance 2	2006	
"Hypnotized"	Carl Sturken; Evan Rogers; Robyn Fenty	Music of the Sun (bonus track)	2005	
"If I Never See Your Face Again" Maroon 5 featuring Rihanna	Adam Levine; James Valentine	Good Girl Gone Bad: Reloaded and It Won't Be Soon Before Long	2008	
"If It's Lovin' that You Want"	Jean-Claude Oliver; Lawrence Krisna Parker; Makeba Riddick; Samuel Barnes; Scott La Rock	Music of the Sun	2005	
"If It's Lovin' that You Want (Part 2)" Rihanna featuring Cory Gunz	Jean-Claude Oliver; Lawrence Krisna Parker; Makeba Riddick; Samuel Barnes; Scott La Rock; Alaxsander Mosely	A Girl Like Me	2006	
"It Just Don't Feel Like Xmas (Without You)"	Carl Sturken; Evan Rogers	Now That's What I Call Christmas! 3	2006	
"James Joint"	Robert Shea Taylor; James Fauntleroy; Robyn Fenty	Anti	2016	
"Jump"	Elgin Lumpkin; Kevin Cossom; Michael Williams; Mikkel S. Eriksen; Sam Milton; Stephen Garrett; Timothy Mosely; Tor Erik Hermansen; Will Kennard	Unapologetic	2012	
"Just Stand Up!" Various artists	Kenneth "Babyface" Edmonds; Ronnie Walton	Charity record	2008	
"Kiss It Better"	Jeff Bhasker; John Glass; Teddy Sinclair; Robyn Fenty	Anti	2016	
"Kisses Don't Lie"	Carl Sturken; Evan Rogers; Robyn Fenty	A Girl Like Me	2006	
"The Last Song"	Ben Harrison; Brian Kennedy; James Fauntleroy II; Robyn Fenty	Rated R	2009	
"The Last Time"	Carl Sturken; Evan Rogers	Music of the Sun	2005	
"Lemme Get That"	Shawn Carter; Terius Nash; Timothy Mosley	Good Girl Gone Bad	2007	
"Lemon" N.E.R.D. featuring Rihanna	Pharrell Williams; Robyn Fenty	No One Ever Really Dies	2017	
"Let Me"	Carl Sturken; Evan Rogers; Makeba Riddick; Mikkel S. Eriksen; Tor Erik Hermansen	Music of the Sun	2005	
"Lift Me Up"	Robyn Fenty; Ryan Coogler; Ludwig Göransson; Temilade Openiyi	Black Panther: Wakanda Forever – Music From and Inspired By	2022	
"Live Your Life" T.I. featuring Rihanna	B. Dan Mihai; Clifford Harris; Justin Smith; Makeba Riddick	Paper Trail	2008	
"Livin' a Lie" The-Dream featuring Rihanna	Carlos McKinney; Christopher "Tricky" Stewart; Terius Nash	Love Hate	2007	
"Lost in Paradise"	Ester Dean; Mikkel S. Eriksen; Timothy McKenzie; Tor Erik Hermansen	Unapologetic	2012	
"Love on the Brain"	Fred Ball; Joseph Angel; Robyn Fenty	Anti	2016	
"Love the Way You Lie" Eminem featuring Rihanna	Alexander Grant; Holly Hafermann; Marshall Mathers	Recovery	2010	
"Love the Way You Lie (Part II)" Rihanna featuring Eminem	Alexander Grant; Holly Hafermann; Marshall Mathers	Loud	2010	
"Love Without Tragedy / Mother Mary"	Carlos McKinney; Terius Nash	Unapologetic	2012	
"Loveeeeeee Song" Rihanna featuring Future	Denisea "Blue June" Andrews; Nayvadius Wilburn	Unapologetic	2012	
"Loyalty" Kendrick Lamar featuring Rihanna	Kendrick Duckworth; Dacoury Natche; Mark Spears; Terrace Martin; Anthony Tiffith	Damn	2017	
"Mad House"	Makeba Riddick; Robyn Fenty; Saul Milton; Will Kennard	Rated R	2009	
"Man Down"	Shama Joseph; Timothy Thomas; Theron Thomas; Shontelle Layne; Robyn Fenty	Loud	2010	
"A Million Miles Away"	Carl Sturken; Evan Rogers	A Girl Like Me	2006	
"The Monster" Eminem featuring Rihanna	Marshall Mathers; Bryan Fryzel; Aaron Kleinstub; M. Athanasiou; Robyn Fenty; Jon Bellion; Bebe Rexha	The Marshall Mathers LP 2	2013	
"Music of the Sun"	Carl Sturken; Diane Warren; Evan Rogers; Robyn Fenty	Music of the Sun	2005	
"Needed Me"	Dijon McFarlane; Robyn Fenty; Nick Audino; Lewis Hughes; Khaled Rohaim; Te Warbrick; Adam Feeney; Brittany Hazzard; Charles Hinshaw Jr. Derrus Rachel	Anti	2016	
"Never Ending"	Chad Sabo; Robyn Fenty; Paul Herman; Dido Armstrong	Anti	2016	
"No Love Allowed"	Alexander Izquierdo; Ernest Wilson; Sean Fenton; Steve Wyreman	Unapologetic	2012	
"Now I Know"	Carl Sturken; Evan Rogers; Robyn Fenty	Music of the Sun	2005	
"Nobody's Business" Rihanna featuring Chris Brown	Carlos McKinney; Michael Jackson; Terius Nash	Unapologetic	2012	
"Nothing Is Promised" Mike Will Made It and Rihanna	James Fauntleroy II; Michael Williams II; Asheton "Pluss" Hogan; Nayvadius Wilburn; Robyn Fenty	Ransom 2	2016	
"Numb" Rihanna featuring Eminem	Aldrin Davis; Connie Mitchell; Kanye West; Marshall Mathers; Warren "Oak" Felder; Ronald "Flippa" Colson; Sam Dew	Unapologetic	2012	
"Numba 1 (Tide Is High)" Kardinal Offishall featuring Rihanna	Dwayne Chin-Quee; Jason Harrow; John Holt	Not 4 Sale	2008	
"The One" Memphis Bleek featuring Rihanna	Carl Sturken; Charles Jackson; Evan Rogers; Malik Cox; Roosevelt Harrell	534	2005	
"Only Girl (In the World)"	Crystal Nicole Johnson; Mikkel S. Eriksen; Sandy Wilhelm; Tor Erik Hermansen	Loud	2010	
"Photographs" Rihanna featuring will.i.am	Allan Pineda; Jean Baptiste; Michael McHenry; William Adams	Rated R	2009	
"Phresh Out the Runway"	David Guetta; Giorgio Tuinfort; Robyn Fenty; Terius Nash	Unapologetic	2012	
"Pon de Replay"	Carl Sturken; Evan Rogers; Vada Nobles	Music of the Sun	2005	
"Pose"	Chauncey Hollis; Bibi Bourelly; Robyn Fenty; Jacques Webster	Anti (bonus track)	2016	
"Pour It Up"	Michael Williams; Theron Thomas; Timothy Thomas	Unapologetic	2012	
"Princess of China" Coldplay featuring Rihanna	Brian Eno; Chris Martin; Guy Berryman; Jonny Buckland; Will Champion	Mylo Xyloto	2011	
"P.S. (I'm Still Not Over You)"	Carl Sturken; Evan Rogers	A Girl Like Me	2006	
"Push Up on Me"	Cynthia Weil; J. R. Rotem; Lionel Richie; Makeba Riddick	Good Girl Gone Bad	2007	
"Question Existing"	Shawn Carter; Shaffer Smith; Shea Taylor	Good Girl Gone Bad	2007	
"Raining Men" Rihanna featuring Nicki Minaj	Melvin Hough II; Onika Maraj; Rivelino Wouter; Timothy Thomas; Theron Thomas	Loud	2010	
"Red Lipstick"	Saul Milton; Terius Nash; Robyn Fenty; Will Kennard	Talk That Talk (bonus track)	2011	
"Redemption Song"	Bob Marley	Charity record	2010	
"Rehab"	Hannon Lane; Justin Timberlake; Timothy Mosley	Good Girl Gone Bad	2007	
"Right Now" Rihanna featuring David Guetta	David Guetta; Giorgio Tuinfort; Mikkel S. Eriksen; Nick Rotteveel; Robyn Fenty; Shaffer Smith; Terius Nash; Tor Erik Hermansen	Unapologetic	2012	
"Roc Me Out"	Ester Dean; Mikkel S. Eriksen; Tor Erik Hermansen	Talk That Talk	2011	
"Rockstar 101" Rihanna featuring Slash	Christopher "Tricky" Stewart; Robyn Fenty; Terius Nash	Rated R	2009	
"Roll It" J-Status featuring Rihanna and Shontelle	Sheldon Benjamin; Shontelle Layne	The Beginning	2007	
"Rude Boy"	Ester Dean; Makeba Riddick; Mikkel S. Eriksen; Rob Swire; Robyn Fenty; Tor Erik Hermansen	Rated R	2009	
"Run This Town" Jay-Z featuring Kanye West and Rihanna	Alatas Athanasios; Ernest Wilson; Jeff Bhasker; Kanye West; Robyn Fenty; Shawn Carter	The Blueprint 3	2009	
"Rush" Rihanna featuring Kardinal Offishall	Carl Sturken; Evan Rogers	Music of the Sun	2005	
"Russian Roulette"	Charles T. Harmon; Shaffer Smith	Rated R	2009	
"S&M"	Ester Dean; Mikkel S. Eriksen; Sandy Wilhelm; Tor Erik Hermansen	Loud	2010	
"Same Ol' Mistakes"	Kevin Parker	Anti	2016	
"Say It"	Brian Thompson; Clifton Dillon; Ewart Brown; Makeba Riddick; Quaadir Atkinson; Lowell "Sly" Dunbar	Good Girl Gone Bad	2007	
"Selfish" Future featuring Rihanna	Nayvadius Wilburn; Noel Fisher; Omar Walker; Robyn Fenty	Hndrxx	2017	
"Selfish Girl"	Carl Sturken; Evan Rogers	A Girl like Me	2006	
"Sell Me Candy"	Makeba Riddick; Terius Nash; Timothy Mosley	Good Girl Gone Bad	2007	
"Sex with Me"	Jahron Braithwaite; Matthew Samuels; Adam Feeney; Anderson Hernandez; Chris Hansen; Robyn Fenty	Anti (bonus track)	2016	
"Should I?" Rihanna featuring J-Status	Carl Sturken; Evan Rogers; J-Status	Music of the Sun (bonus track)	2005	
"Shut Up and Drive"	Bernard Sumner; Carl Sturken; Evan Rogers; Gillian Gilbert; Peter Hook; Stephen Paul David Morris	Good Girl Gone Bad	2007	
"Shy Ronnie 2: Ronnie & Clyde" The Lonely Island featuring Rihanna	Andy Samberg; Robyn Fenty; Akiva Schaffer; Jorma Taccone; T. Williams	Turtleneck & Chain	2011	
"Skin"	Kenneth Coby; Ursula Yancy; Robyn Fenty	Loud	2010	
"Sledgehammer"	Jesse Shatkin; Robyn Fenty; Sia Furler	Non-album single	2016	
"SOS"	Ed Cobb; Evan "Kidd" Bogart; J. R. Rotem	A Girl like Me	2006	
"Stay" Rihanna featuring Mikky Ekko	Elof Loelv; Justin Parker; Mikky Ekko	Unapologetic	2012	
"Stranded (Haiti Mon Amour)" Rihanna with Bono, The Edge and Jay-Z	David Evans; Kasseem Dean; Paul Hewson; Robyn Fenty; Shawn Carter	Hope for Haiti Now	2010	
"Stupid in Love"	Mikkel S. Eriksen; Tor Erik Hermansen; Shaffer Smith	Rated R	2009	
"Take a Bow"	Mikkel S. Eriksen; Shaffer Smith; Tor Erik Hermansen	Good Girl Gone Bad: Reloaded	2008	
"Take Care" Drake featuring Rihanna	Aubrey Graham; James Smith; Noah Shebib	Take Care	2011	
"Talk That Talk" Rihanna featuring Jay-Z	Anthony Best; Chucky Thompson; Christopher Wallace; Ester Dean; Mikkel S. Eriksen; Sean Combs; Shawn Carter; Tor Erik Hermansen	Talk That Talk	2011	
"Te Amo"	James Fauntleroy II; Mikkel S. Eriksen; Robyn Fenty; Tor Erik Hermansen	Rated R	2009	
"That La, La, La"	Brian George; Curt Bedeau; Dernst Emile II; Gerry Charles; Junior Clark; Lucien George Jr. Paul Anthony	Music of the Sun	2005	
"There's a Thug in My Life" Rihanna featuring J-Status	Carl Sturken; Evan Rogers; E. Jordan	Music of the Sun	2005	
"This Is What You Came For" Calvin Harris featuring Rihanna	Calvin Harris; Taylor Swift	Non-album single	2016	
"Throw Your Hands Up" Elephant Man featuring Rihanna	Carl Sturken; Bryan O'Neil; Christopher Birch; Evan Rogers; R. Martin; Robyn Fenty	Let's Get Physical	2008	
"Too Good" Drake featuring Rihanna	Aubrey Graham; Robyn Fenty; Paul "Nineteen85" Jefferies; Maneesh Bidaye; Dwayne "Supa Dups" Chin-Quee; Andrew Hershey; Andre Sutherland; A. Martin	Views	2016	
"Towards the Sun"	Tiago Carvalho; Robyn Fenty; Gary Go	Home	2015	
"Umbrella" Rihanna featuring Jay-Z	Christopher "Tricky" Stewart; Kuk Harrell; Shawn Carter; Terius Nash	Good Girl Gone Bad	2007	
"Unfaithful"	Mikkel S. Eriksen; Shaffer Smith; Tor Erik Hermansen	A Girl like Me	2006	
"Wait Your Turn"	James Fauntleroy II; Mikkel S. Eriksen; Robyn Fenty; Saul Milton; Takura Tendayi; Tor Erik Hermansen; Will Kennard	Rated R	2009	
"Watch n' Learn"	Alja Jackson; Chauncey Hollis; Priscilla Renea; Robyn Fenty	Talk That Talk	2011	
"We All Want Love"	Ernest Wilson; Ester Dean; Kevin Randolph; Steve Wyreman	Talk That Talk	2011	
"We Found Love" Rihanna featuring Calvin Harris	Calvin Harris	Talk That Talk	2011	
"We Ride"	Makeba Riddick; Mikkel S. Eriksen; Tor Erik Hermansen	A Girl like Me	2006	
"What's My Name?" Rihanna featuring Drake	Aubrey Graham; Ester Dean; Mikkel S. Eriksen; Traci Hale; Tor Erik Hermansen	Loud	2010	
"What Now"	Parker Ighile; Olivia Waithe; Nathan Cassells	Unapologetic	2012	
"Where Have You Been"	Calvin Harris; Ester Dean; Geoff Mack; Henry Walter; Lukasz Gottwald	Talk That Talk	2011	
"Who Ya Gonna Run To"	Carl Sturken; Evan Rogers	A Girl like Me (bonus track)	2006	
"Who's That Chick?" David Guetta featuring Rihanna	David Guetta; Frédéric Riesterer; Giorgio Tuinfort; Kinda "Kee" Hamid	One Love	2010	
"Wild Thoughts"	Jahron Braithwaite; Khaled Khaled; Robyn Fenty; Bryson Tiller; Jerry Duplessis; Wyclef Jean; David Mcrae; High Moore; Carlos Santana	Grateful	2017	
"Willing to Wait"	Carl Sturken; Cotton Greene; Deniece Williams; Evan Rogers; Henry Redd; Nathan Watts; Robyn Fenty	Music of the Sun	2005	
"Work"	Jahron Braithwaite; Matthew Samuels; Allen Ritter; Rupert Thomas; Aubrey Graham; Robyn Fenty; Monte Moir	Anti	2016	
"Woo"	Chauncey Hollis; Jacques Webster; Jeremih Felton; Abel Tesfaye; Robyn Fenty; Terius Nash; D. Rachel; Jean Baptist	Anti	2016	
"Yeah, I Said It"	Tim Mosley; Bibi Bourelly; Evon Barnes; Daniel Jones; Chris Godbey; Jean-Paul Bourelly; Robyn Fenty	Anti	2016	
"You da One"	Ester Dean; Henry Walter; John Hill; Lukasz Gottwald; Robyn Fenty	Talk That Talk	2011	
"You Don't Love Me (No, No, No)" Rihanna featuring Vybz Kartel	Dawn Penn; Bo Diddley; Willie Cobbs	Music of the Sun	2005	

== Unreleased songs ==
Song	Writer(s)	Album(s)	Year	Ref.
"Ah!"	Unknown	Music removed from the lineup Anti	2015	
"Abort"	Unknown	Music removed from the lineup Anti	2015	
"Answer"	Unknown	Music removed from the lineup Talk That Talk	2011	
"Baby Brown Eyes"	Unknown	Music removed from the lineup Music Of The Sun	2005	
"Body, Soul & Mind"	Unknown	Music removed from the lineup Anti	2015	
"Brand New"	Unknown	Music removed from the lineup Anti	2015	
"Bring it Back"	Unknown	Music removed from the lineup A Girl Like Me	2006	
"Bubble Pop"	Makeba Riddick; Faløn King; Will Adams; Kevin Saunderson	Music removed from the lineup Good Girl Gone Bad	2008	
"Burritos"	Unknown	Music removed from the lineup Anti	2014	
"Cause It Don't Matter"	Unknown	Music removed from the lineup Anti	2015	
"Cigarettes & Lipstick"	Unknown	Music removed from the lineup Anti	2015	
"Dream Come On Up"	Unknown	Music removed from the lineup Anti	2015	
"Danger"	Benito Benites; John Virgo Garrett III; Giorgio Tuinfort; David Guetta	—N/a	2021	
"Drive Alone"	Priscilla Renea; Andrew Harr; Jermaine Jackson; Alexander Delicata	Music removed from the lineup Loud	2010	
"Drop That"	Unknown	Music removed from the lineup Anti	2015	
"Freeze It"	Aleicia Renee Gibson; Tyshane Thompson; Robyn Fenty; Simon Plummer; Almando Cresso	—N/a	2019	
"Garden"	Jonathan David Bellion; Robyn Fenty; Stephen David McGregor; Travis Franklyn Mendes; Dwayne Richard Chin-Quee	—N/a	2019	
"Goodbye"	Carl Sturken; Evan Rogers; Robyn Fenty	Music removed from the lineup Good Girl Gone Bad	2007	
"Gwan Look Pon It"	Rachel Derrus; Jon Mills; Robyn Fenty; Garfield Spence; Royah Sydnee; Knox Brown; Jon Asher	—N/a	2019	
"Hatin' on the Club" Rihanna featuring The-Dream	Terius Nash; Tricky Stewart	Music removed from the lineup Good Girl Gone Bad	2008	
"Hot Gyal" XXXTENTACION featuring Rihanna & Mavado	Unknown	Bad Vibes Forever	2019	
"How I Like It"	Makeba Riddick; Solomon "King" Logan; Johnkenun Spivery	Music removed from the lineup Good Girl Gone Bad	2007	
"I Hate It"	Unknown	Music removed from the lineup Anti	2015	
"Just Be Happy"	Marcus Allen; Melvin Sparkman; Shaffer Smith	Promotional release only	2006	
"Just Feel It"	Unknown	Music removed from the lineup Anti	2014	
"Only One Who Knows"	Rihanna; Raquelle Anteola; Jake Broido; Ryan Gladieux; Salva; Tiarra Thomas	Music removed from the lineup Anti	2015	
"One Way Ticket"	Unknown	Music removed from the lineup Anti	2015	
"PND"	Unknown	Music removed from the lineup Anti	2015	
"Put It Up" Rihanna featuring Chris Brown	Unknown	—N/a	2015	
"Same Old Love"	Charlotte Aitchison; Ross Golan; Tor Erik Hermansen; Mikkel S. Eriksen; Benjamin Levin	Music removed from the lineup Anti	2014	
"Suffer"	Unknown	Music removed from the lineup Anti	2015	
"Sexuality"	Philip Taj Jackson; Mikkel Storleer Eriksen; Tor Erik Hermansen	Music removed from the lineup Good Girl Gone Bad	2008	
"Taurus"	Unknown	Music removed from the lineup Anti	2015	
"Tip Pon Toe"	Angela Hunte; Peter Keusch; Jason Poras	Music removed from the lineup Music Of The Sun	2005	
"Turn Up the Music (Remix)" Chris Brown featuring Rihanna	Alexander "Fuego" Palmer; Chris Brown; Damon Thomas; Harvey Mason Jr. Michael "Mike J" Jimenez; Robyn Fenty; Terence Cole; Agent X	—N/a	2012	
"Used To (Nobody)" Rihanna featuring Chris Brown	Unknown	—N/a	2017	
"Whipping my Hair"	Terius Nash; Tricky Stewart	Music removed from the lineup Good Girl Gone Bad	2007	
"World Peace" Rihanna featuring Martha Redbone	Ester Dean	Didn't make the cut Unapologetic	2014	
"Walk Away"	Unknown	Music removed from the lineup Anti	2015	
