= Patrick Allen (music educator) =

British author (born 1955)

- Born: 17 October 1955 (age 70)
- Education: University of Leeds, University of Sussex, University of Strasbourg, SOAS
- Occupations: Teacher and author
- Writing career
- Language: English
- Period: 1987–present
- Genre: Music Education
- Notable work: Singing Matters
- Notable awards: Times Educational Supplement Schoolbook Award, The Guardian Award for Secondary Teacher of the Year, NUT/MfY Teacher Award
- Website: www.musicskool.com

Patrick Allen (born 17 October 1955) is the English author of Singing Matters (Heinemann publishers), which won the Times Educational Supplement Schoolbook Award in 1999. He also won The Guardian Award for Teacher of the Year in a Secondary School in 2004 and the NUT Teacher Award for "inspirational leadership of a music group" at the 2015 National Festival of Music for Youth. Until July 2015, he worked as an Advanced Skills Teacher, based at Ifield Community College in Crawley, England where he was also Head of Music and Chair of Arts. He was awarded Advanced Skills Teacher status in 2001. Allen is a UK judge for the Teaching Awards, a music education consultant and a PhD research student at SOAS.

== Early career ==
Patrick Allen studied French, Music and English at three Universities (Leeds, Sussex and Strasbourg), and he began his career as a teacher of English and Drama. He switched to music teaching following MA studies at Sussex University. His practical, hands-on approach to music proved popular with students and word of his success with classes and performing ensembles led to approaches from publishers in the 1990s.

== Publications ==
Singing Matters (Heinemann 1997) was widely acclaimed in the educational and academic press and remains a very popular text and teaching tool with music educators in the United Kingdom and beyond. Allen's subsequent Heinemann publications, Developing Singing Matters (1999) and Composing Matters (2002) are also widely used in schools and provide a practical and inclusive repertoire of activities for secondary pupils. Allen also contributes to educational journals, and was a co-author of Music Suite, an interactive CD-ROM published by On-Line Classics (2004).

== Outreach work ==
His work as an Advanced Skills Teacher and his consultancy work have seen him provide support and training since 1998 for local education authorities and universities across the United Kingdom the National Association of Music Educators, The Scottish Association for Music Education, The Halle Orchestra, the Department for Education and Skills and a range of private training providers.

== Ifield Community College Choir ==
Patrick Allen has been the director and conductor of this youth choir based at Ifield Community College since 1987. As well as being seven times regional winners and national finalists in the National Festival of Music for Youth, the choir was one of two choirs selected by the BBC in 2011 to represent the UK in the international Let the Peoples Sing choral festival. The choir has performed five times on BBC Radio 3. In 2011 it was the subject of a feature on BBC Radio 3 Music Matters, focusing on the integration of the school's Chagossian drummers, and later in the year performed in a broadcast gala concert from the BBC MediaCityUK in Salford Quays. In 2012 the choir performed live on BBC Radio 3 from The Roundhouse in London. As well as receiving widespread praise for its musical achievements the choir has also been praised for its inclusive approach, multicultural repertoire and for "raising the aspirations" of its members. The choir was the subject of a film by SVC Television, directed by Andrew Vere in 1996 and has performed at world class venues such as The Royal Festival Hall, St Mark's Basilica in Venice and Barcelona Cathedral. The choir perform on Rihanna's single Towards the Sun (released March 2015), co-written and produced by former choir member, Tiago Carvalho. The song, featuring the choir and Patrick Allen as Choir Master, also appears in the DreamWorks Animation production Home: Original Motion Picture Soundtrack, curated by Rihanna.

== Chagossian Drummers ==
Patrick Allen is responsible for the formation and development of a drumming group at Ifield Community College consisting entirely of boys from the displaced Chagossian community, who had been arriving in Crawley from Mauritius since 2004. The special musical culture and relationship between the performers led to immediate national interest, and integration with the choir. A first performance at the Royal College of Music for the National Association of Music Educators, was followed by a performance at the Royal Geographical Society at the Chagos Regagne Conference and two performances with the BBC Singers in Crawley and at Maida Vale Studios, entitled Rhythms of the World. In May 2011 they, and the choir, were the subject of a feature in The Times. The drummers performed with the college choir on BBC Radio 3 and were interviewed for BBC Radio in 2011. Their journey and experience in Crawley is described in a blog, and in a number of articles. They have also come to the attention of academic researchers, including a conference at King's College London in March 2012. The group have also had coverage in the Mauritian press and won awards in the Crawley community.

== Books ==
Title	Publisher
Singing Matters ISBN 978-0435810153	Heinemann 1997 Oxford
Developing Singing Matters ISBN 978-0435810184	Heinemann 1999 Oxford
Composing Matters Pupil Book ISBN 978-0435811822	Heinemann 2002 Oxford
Composing Matters CD/CD-ROM ISBN 978-0435811808	Heinemann 2002 Oxford
Composing Matters Teacher Resource Pack ISBN 978-0435811815	Heinemann 2002 Oxford
Europe: World of Music ISBN 978-0431117768	Heinemann Library 2008 Chicago

== Published articles ==
Main Publication	Chapter
NAME Magazine (National Association of Music Educators) No.2 1999	Singing Really Matters!
Bluebirds and Crows (NAME) ISBN 0 9505789-3-2	Finding the Perfect Song -a look at classroom repertoire.
NAME Magazine (National Association of Music Educators) No.12 2004	Are Public Examinations Damaging Music Education?
NAME Magazine (National Association of Music Educators) No.29 2007	Motivating Students to Sing
SecEd Magazine 14 October 2010	What I have learned from the Chagossians
Sussex Life Magazine December 2011	Singing the World.
Constructing Critical Consciousness ed. Lea. Peter Lang (New York) 2012	Working with Chagossian Teenagers in Crawley, England
