= Ifield Community College =

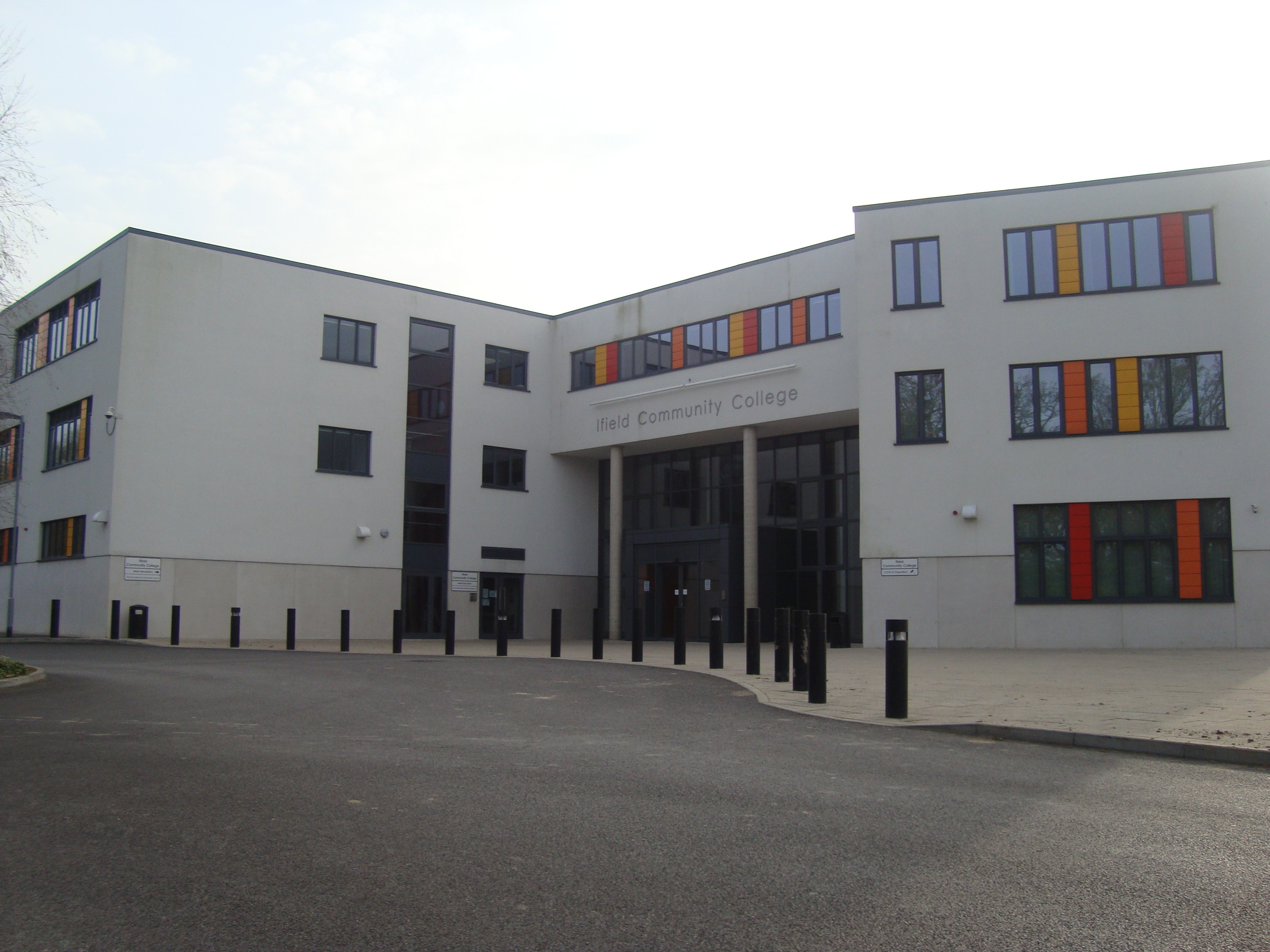

Location
- Crawley Avenue; Crawley, West Sussex, RH11 0DB; England; 51.1172°N 0.2096°W

Information
- Type: Community school
- Established: 1966
- Founder: Sarah Robinson
- Local authority: West Sussex County Council
- Department for Education URN: 150094 Tables
- Ofsted: Reports
- Principal: Dan Conlon
- Gender: Mixed
- Age: 11 to 18
- Enrolment: 1204
- Colour: Black (and red logo)
- Former name: Ifield Grammar School
- Website: www.ifieldcc.w-sussex.sch.uk

Ifield Community College (ICC) is a maintained comprehensive secondary school in Crawley, England, for pupils aged 11 to 18, containing approximately 1200 pupils.

== Admissions ==
It has around 1200 pupils in all years, including over 100 in its sixth form. It is situated in the west of Crawley, next to the A23. Ifield railway station is nearby to the south. The school is comprehensive, providing education for pupils aged between 11 and 18 of all abilities.

The school tends to be highly oversubscribed, and so prioritization for students focuses on students with EHCP plans naming Ifield Community College, students who reside in Bewbush, Ifield, Gossops Green, West Green, Langley Green, Gatwick and parts of County Oak, and students with siblings who already attend the school.

== History ==
The school has history dating back to 1852 – nearly 100 years before the coming of the new town. It began as a free school opened by Mrs Sarah Robinson in the village of Crawley. A new building was opened in 1854 in what was later to become known as Robinson Road in honour of the teacher. In 1953, the school lost its primary-aged pupils with the opening of the new West Green county junior and infants' school. Many older pupils were moved to the newly opened Hazelwick School with the remainder transferring to the new Sarah Robinson secondary modern School buildings opened on the Ifield campus in 1956.

=== Comprehensive ===
At this time, the secondary modern school shared a campus with the newly-opened Ifield County Grammar School, built in 1955. The schools worked closely together, eventually merging in 1966 to become Ifield comprehensive school following retirement of F.C. Willmott, the Headmaster at the Sarah Robinson school. A headmaster, Mr Bomford, was brought in to oversee the transition and he introduced formality, with senior teachers wearing gowns in assemblies for the first time, a tradition now discontinued. Ifield Comprehensive at this time held a considerable reputation for sport, particularly football and athletics. The pupils at this time included Jeff Bryant, who went on to be a professional footballer with Wimbledon, and Alan Minter, a World Boxing Champion.

=== 1980 arson attack ===
On the 24th of February, 1980, there was a large fire that cost £100,000. A 15 year old boy and 16 year old boy were jailed for life in August 1980. Their parents appealed against the heavy sentences, which were considered disproportionate, in February 1981, but lost the appeal.

=== New buildings ===
By 1984 there were some 1600 pupils on roll - including Keith Newell who went on to play cricket for Sussex County Cricket Club.

Developments in the early 1980s saw the two separate buildings co-locating, with former buildings becoming the home of Ifield Middle School in 1985. In 2005, a new school building opened in the centre of the campus, with the old buildings being demolished.

=== Academisation ===
On the 1st of June, 2025, Ifield Community College joined the Collegiate Trust.

== Campus ==
The campus for the school was set aside in the masterplan for Crawley New Town along the eastern edge of the neighbourhood of Ifield alongside the A23. It was shared with St Margaret's Church of England primary school, and later the Holy Cross Intermediate School.

In 2005, a new building for the school was opened in the southeasternmost corner of the large campus, maintaining the existing tree-lined boundaries. The campus is still shared with St Margaret's School, and now The Mill Primary School and the Manor Green special schools.

== Choir ==
Ifield Community College had a choir made up of students from all age groups in the school. In 1996 it was the subject of a film by SVC television, directed by Andrew Vere. The choir, led by Patrick Allen (music educator), has performed at European venues including St Mark's Basilica in Venice (2008), the Royal Festival Hall, London, Barcelona Cathedral, the Auditorium Stravinski in Montreux and a recent (June 2011) collaboration with the BBC Singers saw them performing and recording at Maida Vale Studios. They have been six times finalists at the National Festival of Music for Youth, most recently in 2009, 2010 and 2014. The choir was the subject of a feature on BBC Radio 3's Music Matters in May 2011, focusing on the integration of the choir's Chagossian Drummers. The choir also represented the UK in The Let The People's Sing Gala Concert, broadcast on BBC Radio 3 in October 2011. The choir broadcast live on BBC Radio 3 in March 2012 as part of the Voice's Now festival from The Roundhouse, London. The choir is now discontinued.

== School Productions ==
Every year, a whole-school production is performed - casting and auditions take place around July–September, and the show is usually put on around December. All students are allowed to join. Previously, the school has put on both pantomimes and musicals.Previous whole-school productions include:

- Beauty And The Beast Jr - 2026
- Shrek The Musical Jr - 2025
- Matilda - 2024
- Alice In Wonderland - 2023
- Jack and the Beanstalk - 2022
- Peter Pan - 2021

Some productions also occur within specific year-groups of the school, such as The Pillowman, taking place in 2025, which was limited to Sixth Formers.

== Notable former pupils ==
- Jodie Grinham, representing Team GB in the 2016 Summer Paralympics and the 2024 Summer Paralympics as an archer; She grew up in Crawley and attended Ifield Community College.

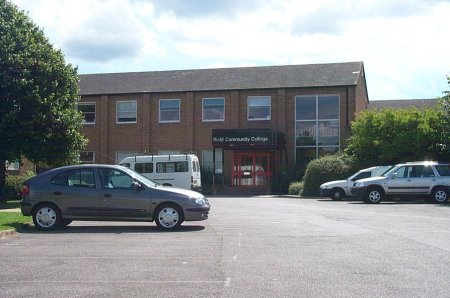
School in 2004 before demolition in 2005
