= Feel the Light =

Single by Jennifer Lopez

from the album Home
- Released: February 25, 2015
- Recorded: 2014
- Length: 4:52
- Label: Westbury Road
- Songwriters: Mikkel S. Eriksen; Tor Erik Hermansen; Kiesza Rae Ellestad; Emile Haynie
- Producers: Stargate; Emile Haynie

Jennifer Lopez singles chronology
| "Booty" (2014) | "Feel the Light" (2015) | "Back It Up" (2015) |

Music video
- "Feel the Light" on YouTube

"Feel the Light" is a ballad song recorded by American singer Jennifer Lopez for the soundtrack of the 2015 film, Home.

== Background ==
In June 2012, it was revealed that Barbadian singer Rihanna and American actor Jim Parsons would star as the lead roles in the film Happy Smekday!, retitled to Home in June 2013. In 2014, Variety reported that, in addition to her voice role, Rihanna created a concept album for the film which was released on March 17, 2015. It was later revealed that the film's soundtrack would also include songs recorded by Charli XCX, Kiesza, and Jennifer Lopez. "Feel the Light" was written by Mikkel S. Eriksen, Tor Erik Hermansen, and Kiesza, while the production was done by the former two under their production name StarGate. Following "Towards the Sun", it was digitally released as the second single from the soundtrack on February 25, 2015 via the iTunes Store. In the film, the song was heard when Oh the Boov and his new friend Tip finally find Tip's mom (voiced by Lopez), as well as during the end credits.

== Music video ==
On February 24, 2015, a lyric video of "Feel the Light" was posted on YouTube via the DreamWorks Animation official channel. The video features Jennifer Lopez in a studio while recording the song, while the footage is being intercut with scenes from Home.

On March 3, 2015, Jennifer Lopez teased the song's official music video, posting images from the shoot on her Instagram account. The images showed her wearing a white suit, standing in front of a green screen and sporting a braid. Erin Strecker of Billboard noted that the shoot appears to be intergalactic.

The official music video was released by Jennifer Lopez on her Vevo YouTube channel on March 20, 2015 and was directed by Hype Williams.

== Critical reception ==
In her review of the song, Bianca Gracie of Idolator wrote, "the featherlight tune (pun intended) is a beautiful and delicate mid-tempo that can be enjoyed by children and adults alike." MTV UK's Michael Pell noted, "Feel The Light is a heart-felt ballad with the video taking us through a magical journey of friendship between the wee girl and her alien pal."

== Charts ==
| Chart (2015) | Peak position |
|---|---|
| US Kid Digital Songs (Billboard) | 1 |

== Release history ==
| Country | Date | Format | Label |
|---|---|---|---|
| Australia | February 25, 2015 | Digital download | Westbury Road |
| Canada | February 25, 2015 | Digital download | Westbury Road |
| France | February 25, 2015 | Digital download | Westbury Road |
| Germany | February 25, 2015 | Digital download | Westbury Road |
| Ireland | February 25, 2015 | Digital download | Westbury Road |
| Italy | February 25, 2015 | Digital download | Westbury Road |
| New Zealand | February 25, 2015 | Digital download | Westbury Road |
| Spain | February 25, 2015 | Digital download | Westbury Road |
| United Kingdom | February 25, 2015 | Digital download | Westbury Road |
| United States | February 25, 2015 | Digital download | Westbury Road |
