= Dancing in the Dark (Rihanna song) =

Song by Rihanna

from the album Home
- Released: March 5, 2015
- Recorded: 2014
- Genre: Dance-pop
- Length: 3:43
- Label: Westbury Road; Roc Nation
- Songwriters: Tor Erik Hermansen; Mikkel Storleer Eriksen; Ester Dean; Maureen Anne McDonald; Robyn Fenty
- Producers: Stargate; Kuk Harrell

"Dancing in the Dark" is a song recorded by Barbadian singer Rihanna for the soundtrack to the 2015 film Home. It was written by Ester Dean, Maureen Anne McDonald and Rihanna together with its producers Stargate.

== Development ==
In June 2012, it was revealed that Rihanna would star as the lead role in the film Happy Smekday!, alongside American actor Jim Parsons. In September 2012, 20th Century Fox and DreamWorks Animation announced that the movie will be released for November 26, 2014. In June 2013, the film was retitled from Happy Smekday! to Home. In 2014, Variety magazine reported that, in addition to her voice role, Rihanna created a concept album for the film was released on March 13, 2015. It was later revealed that the film's soundtrack would also include songs recorded by Charli XCX, Kiesza and Jennifer Lopez. "Dancing in the Dark" was written by Tor Erik Hermansen, Mikkel Storleer Eriksen, Ester Dean, Maureen Anne McDonald and Rihanna. The production was done by Hermansen and Eriksen under their production name Stargate. Dean has previously co-penned a number of songs for Rihanna including, "S&M" (2011) and "Rude Boy" (2010), both of which were produced by Stargate. The vocals were recorded by Marcos Tovar and Kuk Harrell, while the later also did their production. Phil Tan mixed the song at the Ninja Beat Club in Atlanta, Georgia while Daniela Rivera served as the track's engineer.

== Composition ==
"Dancing in the Dark" is a dance-pop song with a length of three minutes and forty-three seconds. The track is an up-tempo "poppy-number" that features "enough backdrop of saccharine synths and snap beats". According to James Grebey of Spin magazine it's also "upbeat and a little funkier — if a tad repetitive." Rolling Stone's Jon Blistein linked "Dancing in the Dark"'s chorus to the one of Whitney Houston's 1987 single "I Wanna Dance with Somebody (Who Loves Me)". He also wrote that the song has a "wubby bass groove" that could feature American actress Courteney Cox dancing to it in its potential music video, a reference to her appearance in the video for Bruce Springsteen's 1984 single with the same name.

== Credits and personnel ==
Credits adapted from the liner notes of Home.

Locations

- Mixed at Ninja Beat Club, Atlanta, Georgia

Personnel

- Lead and background vocals - Rihanna
- Songwriting – Tor Erik Hermansen, Mikkel Storleer Eriksen, Ester Dean, Maureen Anne McDonald, Robyn Fenty
- Production – Stargate
- Engineer – Daniela Rivera
- Vocal production – Kuk Harrell
- Recording – Marcos Tovar, Kuk Harrell
- Mixing – Phil Tan

== Charts ==
Chart (2015)	Peak position
France (SNEP)	92
US Kid Digital Songs (Billboard)	2

== Certifications ==
Region	Certification	Certified units/sales
Australia (ARIA)	Platinum	70,000^{‡}
New Zealand (RMNZ)	Platinum	30,000^{‡}
United Kingdom (BPI)	Silver	200,000^{‡}
United States (RIAA)	Platinum	1,000,000^{‡}
^{‡} Sales+streaming figures based on certification alone.
