= Home (soundtrack) =

2015 soundtrack album

Home: Original Motion Picture Soundtrack

Soundtrack album by various artists
- Released: March 13, 2015
- Recorded: 2014–2015
- Studio: Various: The Canvas Room, London; Metropolis Studios, London; Westlake Studios, Los Angeles
- Genres: Pop; house; R&B
- Length: 32:41
- Labels: Westbury Road; Roc Nation
- Producers: Emile Haynie; Rodney "Darkchild" Jerkins; Paul Dawson; Jacob Plant; StarGate; Stereotypes; Tiago; Rihanna exec.

Singles from Home: Original Motion Picture Soundtrack
- 1. "Towards the Sun" Released: February 9, 2015; 2. "Feel the Light" Released: February 25, 2015

Home: Original Motion Picture Soundtrack is the soundtrack album for the 2015 animated film Home, based on the 2007 children book The True Meaning of Smekday by Adam Rex. It features songs recorded by film stars Rihanna and Jennifer Lopez, as well as Clarence Coffee Jr., Kiesza, Charli XCX, and Jacob Plant. It was released on March 13, 2015 through Rihanna's Westbury Road Entertainment and Jay-Z's Roc Nation. Following the announcement that Rihanna would star in the film, it was revealed she would release a concept album based on the animated film. As the executive producer of the soundtrack, she called on various artists to feature on the album. Rihanna's "Towards the Sun" and Jennifer Lopez's "Feel the Light" were released as singles to promote the album and movie.

== Background ==
In June 2012, it was revealed that Rihanna would star as the lead role in the film Happy Smekday!, alongside American actor Jim Parsons. In September 2012, 20th Century Fox and DreamWorks Animation announced that the movie will be released for November 26, 2014. In June 2013, the film was retitled from Happy Smekday! to Home. In 2014, Variety magazine reported that, in addition to her voice role, Rihanna created a concept album for the film which will be released on March 13, 2015. It was later revealed that the film's soundtrack would also include songs recorded by Charli XCX, Kiesza and Jennifer Lopez. In a statement for MTV News Rihanna said:

"I think music is important to every film. I think it sets the tone, in the moment. It creates the sensitivity, the suspense, no matter what film it is, especially in animation. I've had an incredible time making music for this film. I've worked really closely with Tim Johnson, the director, just to make sure that lyrically, and musically the songs were matching exactly what he needed — what he needed the audience to feel in that moment."

In July 2014 singer songwriter Kiesza announced that Rihanna had recorded two or three of her songs for the album but was unsure if they would appear on the final project. In September 2014, Rihanna was recording in New York City in which she was working with frequent collaborator Ester Dean.

== Composition ==
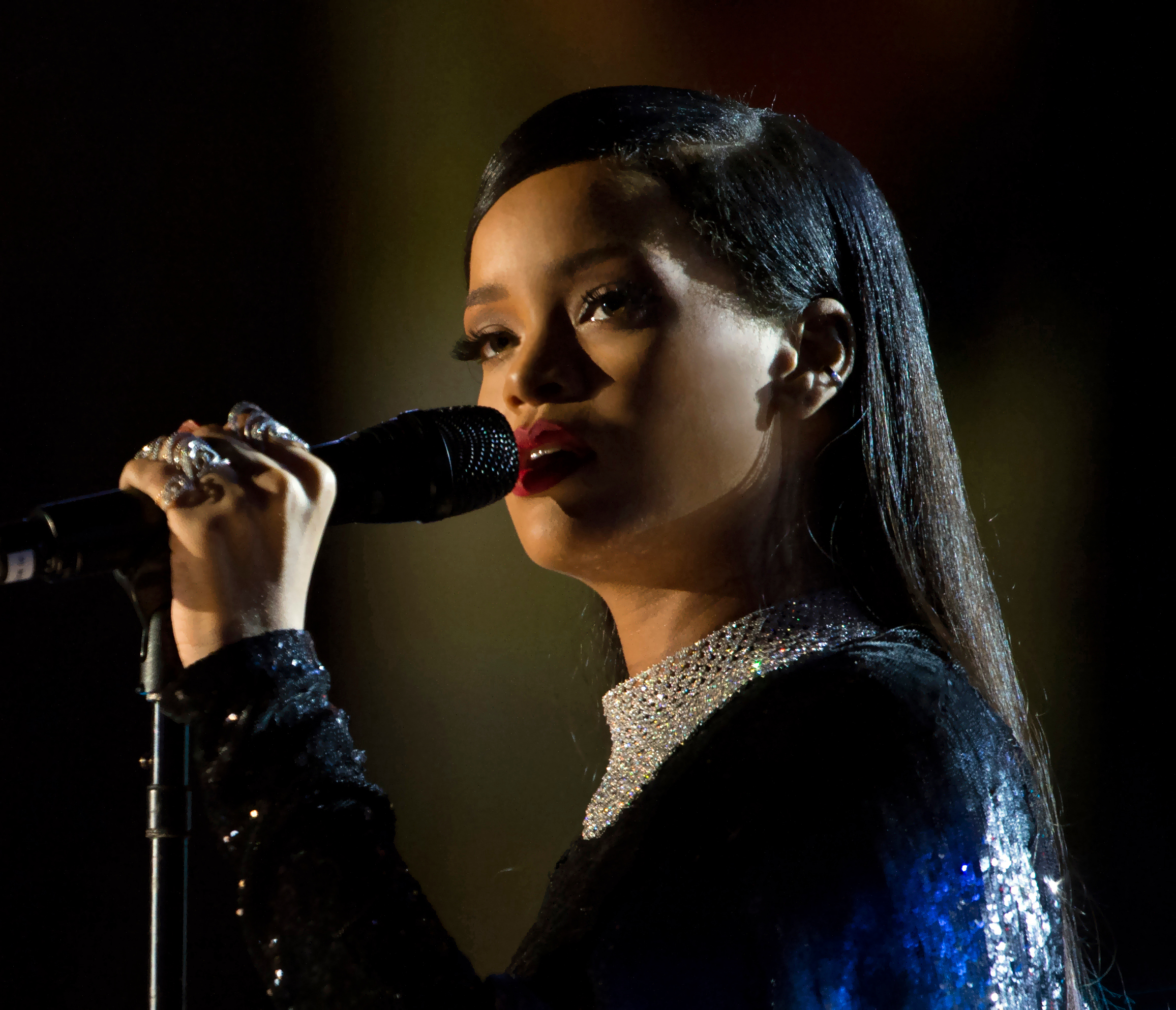
In addition to be the album's executive producer, Rihanna performed three of the soundtrack's songs and co-wrote four of them.

"Towards the Sun" performed by Rihanna, is a mid-tempo pop ballad with R&B influences that features "pounding" drums, sing-along lyrics, "gigantic" chorus, "layered harmonies", "swirling effects" and uplifting, positive lyrics. Madison Vain of Entertainment Weekly opined that the song is "anthemic" and more "whispier" than Rihanna's previous singles. According to Brittany Spanos of Rolling Stone the song is more optimistic and positive than her previous singles and albums which could be heard in the lines, "Turn your face towards the sun. Let the shadows fall behind you."

Another song performed by Rihanna; "Dancing in the Dark" is a dance-pop song with a length of three minutes and forty-three seconds. The track is an up-tempo "poppy-number" that features "enough backdrop of saccharine synths and snap beats". Rolling Stone's Jon Blistein linked "Dancing in the Dark"'s chorus to the one of Whitney Houston's 1987 single "I Wanna Dance with Somebody (Who Loves Me)". He also wrote that the song has a "wubby bass groove" that could feature American actress Courteney Cox dancing to it in its potential music video, a reference to her appearance in the video for Bruce Springsteen's 1984 single with the same name.

Jennifer Lopez's song, "Feel the Light" is an "uplifting" and "tender" ballad with a length of four minutes and fifty-two seconds. During the last of it, Lopez sings the lines, "Feel the light shining in the dark of night / Remember what we forgot / I know it's a longshot / But we're bringing it all back". She performed the song live on American Idol, where short clips from the film were projected onto her dress.

== Singles ==
"Towards the Sun" was written by Tiago Carvalho, Gary Go, and Rihanna. Scott Mills premiered the song on BBC Radio 1 on February 9, 2015 and it was made available for digital download the same day via the iTunes Store. The song was supposed to impact U.S. Top 40/Mainstream radio on March 17, 2015, however, its release was cancelled at the last minute. Upon release it received generally positive reviews from music critics who praised its lyrics, production, chorus and Rihanna's vocals. Commercially the song was a moderate success on charts peaking at seventy six on the UK Singles Chart and twenty two on the French singles chart.

Following "Towards the Sun", "Feel the Light" was digitally released as the second single from the soundtrack on February 25 via the iTunes Store. On February 24, a lyric video of "Feel the Light" was posted on YouTube via the DreamWorks Animation official channel. The video features Lopez in a studio while recording the song while the footage being intercut with scenes from Home. MTV UK's Michael Pell noted, "is a heart-felt ballad with the video taking us through a magical journey of friendship between the wee girl and her alien pal." On March 3, 2015, Lopez teased the song's official music video, posting images from the shoot on her Instagram account. The images showed Lopez wearing a white suit, standing in front of a green screen and sporting a braid. Erin Strecker of Billboard wrote "Naturally, the shoot appears to be quite intergalactic".

== Track listing ==
Home track listing
No.	Title	Writer(s)	Producer(s)	Length
1.	"Towards the Sun" (Rihanna)	Tiago Carvalho; Gary Go; Robyn Fenty	Tiago; Gary Go^{[a]}; Kuk Harrell^{[b]}	4:33
2.	"Run to Me" (Clarence Coffee Jr.)	Jonathan Yip; Ray Romulus; Jeremy Reeves; Ray Charles McCulloch II; Coffee Jr.	Stereotypes	4:14
3.	"Cannonball" (Kiesza)	Tor Erik Hermansen; Mikkel Storleer Eriksen; Kiesa Rae Ellestad; Benjamin Eli Hanna; Emile Haynie	Stargate; Haynie^{[a]}	3:57
4.	"As Real as You and Me" (Rihanna)	Rodney "Darkchild" Jerkins; Alicia Renee Williams; Fenty	Darkchild; Paul Dawson; Harrell^{[b]}	3:40
5.	"Red Balloon" (Charli XCX)	Hermansen; Eriksen; Charlotte Aitchison; Magnus Høiberg	Stargate	3:26
6.	"Dancing in the Dark" (Rihanna)	Hermansen; Eriksen; Ester Dean; Maureen Anne McDonald; Fenty	Stargate; Harrell^{[b]}	3:43
7.	"Drop That" (Jacob Plant)	Plant; Fenty	Plant	4:17
8.	"Feel the Light" (Jennifer Lopez)	Hermansen; Erikson; Ellestad; Haynie	Stargate; Haynie^{[a]}	4:51
Total length:				32:41

Notes

- ^{^a} signifies a co-producer
- ^{^b} signifies a vocal producer

== Personnel ==
- Robyn Rihanna Fenty – executive producer
- Mikkel Eriksen – executive music producer
- Sunny Park – executive in charge of music for DreamWorks Animation
- Jay Brown – A&R
- Tyran "Ty Ty" Smith – A&R
- Omar Grant – A&R
- Justin Adams – A&R coordination
- Karen Console – A&R administration
- Ciarra Pardo – creative direction (Fenty Corp.)
- Dara Michelle – marketing (Roc Nation)
- Gabriela Schwartz – marketing (Def Jam)
- Edward Shapiro – business and legal affairs (Westbury Road Entertainment, LLC)
- Christina Suarez – business and legal affairs (Roc Nation)
- Julie Butchko – music clearances (DreamWorks Animation music department)
- Charlene Ann Huang – director of music (DreamWorks Animation music department)
- Tori Fillat – music coordinator (DreamWorks Animation music department)
- Sebastian Christie – music coordinator (DreamWorks Animation music department)
- Kevin Breen – music business affairs (DreamWorks Animation music department)
- Emily Morchower – music business affairs (DreamWorks Animation music department)
- Chris Gehringer at Sterling Sound, NYC – mastering

== Charts ==
Chart (2015)	Peak position
Australian Albums (ARIA)	40
Belgian Albums (Ultratop Wallonia)	191
Spanish Albums (Promusicae)	76
UK Compilation Albums (Official Charts)	26
UK Soundtrack Albums (OCC)	4
US Billboard 200	40
US Soundtrack Albums (Billboard)	4

== Release history ==
Country	Date	Format	Label	Ref.
Canada	March 13, 2015	Digital download	Westbury Road; Roc Nation	
Germany	March 13, 2015	Digital download	Westbury Road; Roc Nation	
Italy	March 13, 2015	Digital download	Westbury Road; Roc Nation	
Spain	March 13, 2015	Digital download	Westbury Road; Roc Nation	
United Kingdom	March 13, 2015	CD; Digital download	Westbury Road; Roc Nation	
United States	March 13, 2015	CD; Digital download	Westbury Road; Roc Nation	
Australia	March 27, 2015	Digital download	Westbury Road; Roc Nation	
Austria	March 27, 2015	Digital download	Westbury Road; Roc Nation	
New Zealand	March 27, 2015	Digital download	Westbury Road; Roc Nation	
Switzerland	March 27, 2015	Digital download	Westbury Road; Roc Nation	
Germany	April 1, 2015	CD	Westbury Road; Roc Nation	

== See also ==
- List of soundtracks to fictitious movies
