= Save the Last Dance 2 (soundtrack) =

Save The Last Dance 2

Soundtrack album by Various artists
- Released: November 14, 2006
- Length: 46:07
- Label: Mass Appeal Entertainment
- Producer: Shaffer "Ne-Yo" Smith, Reynell "Tango" Hay, Yuson Sherief for Compound Entertainment, Marcus "DL" Siskind, Paul Degooyer, Robert Cort, Dave Petrarca, Tishawn Gayle

Music From And Inspired By The Motion Picture Save The Last Dance 2 is the soundtrack to the film Save the Last Dance 2, a collaboration between MTV and Paramount.

Def Jam recording artist Ne-Yo served as co-executive producer for the album, penning most of the original recordings on the soundtrack including "Watch You Dance".

The set features many R&B artists, including Joe, Rihanna, Ruben Studdard, Cassie, T-Pain, Pitbull, Ghostface Killah, Ryan Toby (formerly of City High,) as well as newcomers Debreca, Noel, Jalen, Jaiden, Candace Jones, and Boxie. Mass Appeal Entertainment is distributed through Fontana Distribution, a division of Universal Music Group.

== Track listing ==
Music From And Inspired By The Motion Picture Save The Last Dance 2:

1. "Dance Floor" by T-Pain – 3:42
2. "Clap for That" by Noel feat. Ghostface Killah – 3:23
3. "Watch You Dance" by Ne-Yo– 3:07
4. "Just My Thang" by Ryan Toby – 3:05
5. "The Hotness " by Rihanna feat. Shontelle – 3:11
6. "Dance Alone" by Debreca – 3:43
7. "It's On You'" by Joe – 3:25
8. "Kiss Me" by Cassie – 4:08
9. "All I Need" by Jalen – 3:28
10. "Feel Beautiful" by Ruben Studdard – 3:27
11. "You and Me" by Candace Jones – 3:52
12. "Bridging the Gap" by Boxie – 3:34
13. "Escape" by Jaiden – 4:04

== Trivia ==
Ne-Yo wrote "Watch You Dance," "It's On You," "All I Need," "Feel Beautiful," and "Bridging the Gap."
