= The True Meaning of Smekday =

2007 children's book by Adam Rex

- Author: Adam Rex
- Cover artist: Adam Rex
- Genre: Science fiction
- Publisher: Disney Hyperion
- Publication date: 2007
- Media type: Print (hardcover and paperback)
- Pages: 423
- ISBN: 978-0-7868-4900-0
- OCLC: 156912803
- LC Class: PZ7.R32865 Tr 2007
- Followed by: Smek for President!
- Website: smekday.com (archived)

The True Meaning of Smekday is a 2007 children's book by Adam Rex. It was adapted by DreamWorks Animation into the 2015 feature film Home.

Rex's second volume in the series, Smek for President!, was published in 2015, prior to the release of Home. The film version, which departed significantly from the books' continuity, was followed by the 2016 animated TV series Home: Adventures with Tip & Oh.

An audiobook edition of The True Meaning of Smekday, read by Bahni Turpin, was released on March 8, 2011.

== Plot summary ==
The story is narrated in first person by an 11-year-old girl and takes the form of a school-assigned essay intended for submission to a national competition, and expected to be stored in a time capsule to be opened in 100 years.

The protagonist is Gratuity "Tip" Tucci, who must survive on her own at age 11, after her mother is abducted by an alien race called the Boov. The entire Boov population arrives in a fleet of ships on Christmas Eve, and use their advanced technology to take over the Earth without bloodshed. The Boov promptly rename Earth and Christmas "Smekland" and "Smekday" respectively, in honor of their leader, Captain Smek.

On "Moving Day", when all humans are required by the Boov to relocate to Florida, Tip evades being transported by the Boov, and instead drives the family car to Florida in search of her mother. When the car breaks down, Tip reluctantly joins forces with a fugitive Boov mechanic who had taken the name J.Lo, thinking it to be a "common Earth name." Tip learns that the overly-friendly J.Lo was fleeing from his fellow Boov because, while modifying radio tower antennas for Boov use, he had accidentally transmitted a strong test signal in the wrong direction. The signal gave away the Earth's location to the Gorg, a violent alien race who had previously conquered the Boov's home planet.

Tip journeys across the Boov-controlled United States with her cat Pig and J.Lo, unsuccessfully seeking her mother at Florida's "Happy Mouse Kingdom," and continuing west to Roswell, New Mexico and Arizona. There, Tip and J.Lo, together with a wise old junk dealer named Chief Shouting Bear, must prevent politician Dan Landry from incompetently reaching a disastrous accommodation with the invading Gorg. In the face of certain death or enslavement by the Gorg, Tip finds her own way to defeat the powerful aliens, saving humans and Boov alike.

== Reception and sequel ==
The book was highly recommended by The New York Times.

Smek for President!, a sequel billed as "Book Two of the Smek Smeries [sic]", was released by Disney Hyperion on February 10, 2015, along with an audiobook edition read by Bahni Turpin. The novel follows Tip and J.Lo on an impromptu summer vacation to New Boovworld, where J.Lo seeks a pardon from Captain Smek, but instead finds himself a pawn in Smek's campaign for High Boov when the Boov adopt human-style politics.

== Film adaptation ==
DreamWorks Animation, in 2008, optioned the book's rights to adapt it into an animated feature film. Adam Rex announced in 2011 on Twitter that DreamWorks had renewed its option on the adaptation.

It was announced on June 20, 2012 that Tim Johnson was set to direct the film, with Rihanna and Jim Parsons voicing the lead roles, and the film would be released in fourth-quarter 2014. Chris Jenkins and Suzanne Buirgy would produce, and writers Tom J. Astle and Matt Ember were signed to adapt the novel into a screenplay. The title of the film was announced as Happy Smekday!; the project was retitled Home a year later.

In September 2012, 20th Century Fox and DreamWorks Animation announced the release for November 26, 2014. The release of Home was later delayed to Spring 2015 in order to avoid competition with Penguins of Madagascar.

Released on March 27, 2015, Home grossed $386 million worldwide. In addition to Rihanna and Parsons, it featured the voices of Steve Martin as Smek, and Jennifer Lopez as Tip's mother.

According to director Tim Johnson, Lopez had known about the book because of the character who used her nickname J.Lo, which helped him attract her to take a voice role in the film. However, despite the actress being "into the idea the alien would be named after her," legal concerns involving trademarks and licensing prompted the filmmakers to rename the character Oh.

In addition to renaming a lead character, the film version departed completely from the plot and continuity of the book in numerous ways. Seeking a more worldwide scope, the screen adaptation had the Boov relocate the human population to Australia, eliminating large portions of the book that took place in Florida, Arizona, and New Mexico. Significant supporting characters, such as Dan Landry and the Chief, did not appear at all, and the film took an entirely different approach in its resolution of the conflict between the Boov and the Gorg. The film also shied away from the more mature and complex aspects of the book, opting to be more kid-friendly.

Home: Adventures with Tip & Oh, an animated television series based on the 2015 film, debuted on Netflix in July 2016.

== Website ==
In conjunction with the 2007 publication of the book, author Adam Rex created a website that purported to be an educational effort by the National Time Capsule Project to provide a historic record of the Boov invasion of Earth for the benefit of future generations. The site included, for example, a short Boov-produced "training video" for humans in which the Boov explained their simplification of the calendar to three months, as well as Smekland's new Boov-approved holidays (such as Smekday, Smeksgiving, and Boov Passover).
