= Home (2015 film) =

DreamWorks Animation film

- Theatrical release poster
- Directed by: Tim Johnson
- Screenplay by: Tom J. Astle; Matt Ember
- Based on: The True Meaning of Smekday by Adam Rex
- Produced by: Mireille Soria; Suzanne Buirgy; Chris Jenkins
- Starring: Jim Parsons; Rihanna; Steve Martin; Jennifer Lopez
- Edited by: Nick Fletcher
- Music by: Lorne Balfe; Stargate
- Production company: DreamWorks Animation
- Distributed by: 20th Century Fox (Note: In 2018, the film's distribution rights were transferred from 20th Century Fox to Universal Pictures, following NBCUniversal's acquisition of DreamWorks Animation in 2016.)
- Release dates: March 7, 2015 (BIFF); March 27, 2015 (United States)
- Running time: 94 minutes
- Country: United States
- Language: English
- Budget: $135 million
- Box office: $386 million

Home is a 2015 American animated science fiction comedy film produced by DreamWorks Animation. which is loosely based on the 2007 children's book The True Meaning of Smekday. The film was directed by Tim Johnson, written by Tom J. Astle and Matt Ember, and stars the voices of Jim Parsons, Rihanna, Jennifer Lopez, and Steve Martin. The story relates the shared adventures of a friendly alien (Parsons) who is shunned by the rest of his kind, and a teenage girl (Rihanna) searching for her lost mother (Lopez) after they are separated during an invasion of Earth.

The film premiered at the Boulder International Film Festival on March 7, 2015, and was released in theaters on March 27 by 20th Century Fox. Home was promoted with the release of a prequel short film, Almost Home, which was shown in theaters in 2014. Rihanna created a concept album of the same name. The soundtrack also includes guest vocals from Lopez, among others, and was supported by two singles, "Towards the Sun" and "Feel the Light". Home received mixed reviews from critics, who praised the animation, voice acting and charm, but were divided on the soundtrack, while also criticizing its humor, plot and unfaithfulness to the source material. Despite this, the film grossed $386 million worldwide against a $135 million budget.

A spin-off television series, Home: Adventures with Tip & Oh, was released on Netflix in 2016. However, it was removed in April 2024 due to licensing agreements.

== Plot ==
A cowardly alien race called the Boov, led by Captain Smek, commences their "friendly" invasion on Earth. Relocating the humans, whom they deem as simple and backwards, to the Australian Outback, the Boov inhabit their homes. Oh, an accident-prone, free-thinking Boov who is trying to fit in, decides to invite the other Boov to his apartment for a housewarming party, but no one comes. Meanwhile, 13-year-old Gratuity "Tip" Tucci, the only human who managed to avoid being taken during the invasion, alongside her Japanese Bobtail cat Pig, is trying to figure out where the other humans have been sent, desperate to reunite with her mother Lucy.

Oh visits Kyle, a grumpy Boov traffic officer and Smek's lieutenant, to invite him to the party, but mistakenly sends the invitation email to every alien race in the galaxy, including the Gorg, who have been the Boov's longtime enemy ever since a failed peace meeting, during which Smek stole an artifact he dubbed "The Shusher". Angry with Oh for revealing their new home to the Gorg, the Boov declare him a fugitive. Oh runs away from the Boov, ending up in a convenience store, just as Tip, driving around in Lucy's car, enters it in search of supplies. Tip attacks Oh on sight and locks him in a freezer, until she lets him out to fix her car, which he turns into a flying craft named "Slushious". To hide from the Boov, Oh promises to help Tip find Lucy, but he secretly plans to abandon her and take himself to Antarctica, the only place on Earth without Boov. He attempts to abandon Tip at a gas station but is thwarted by Kyle, who was sent by Smek to force Oh to give him his email password so Smek can cancel the party invitation that Oh sent.

Escaping Kyle, Oh and Tip head to Paris, home of the Boov Command Center located in the Eiffel Tower, and manage to sneak inside. Oh cancels the invitation before it reaches the Gorg; he then looks for Lucy, and the computer confirms she is in a human camp in Australia, where she is also looking for her daughter. Trying to return to Slushious, Oh and Tip are cornered by Smek, who orders Oh's execution, but Tip uses a Boov gravity device to turn the tower upside down, and she and Oh escape. Oh informs Tip that he no longer believes Smek's propaganda about humans being simple and backward, and apologizes to her. The two set off to Australia, but are attacked by Gorg drones, sent to search for them. Slushious is wrecked as a result, but Oh finds a Gorg SuperChip in a crashed drone, and uses it to repair the car.

When they reach the human relocation camp, Oh realizes the other Boov are evacuating, and fears that the Gorg will take vengeance on Earth when they cannot find the Boov. He then tries to convince Tip to flee with them, but she refuses. Oh joins the Boov, and the Gorg attacks their mothership, but Oh uses the SuperChip he found to increase the ship's speed and escape. Impressed at his bravery, the other Boov listen as Oh berates Smek for his lies and the other Boov for their cowardice. Moved, Kyle takes the Shusher from a horrified Smek and decrees that Oh should be the new captain. Oh reluctantly accepts, turns the mothership around and returns to Earth, where he helps Tip reunite with Lucy, fulfilling his promise.

Realizing from a chance remark of Tip's that the Gorg are actually tracking the Shusher and not the Boov, Oh locks Tip and Lucy inside Slushious, and faces the approaching Gorg's mothership alone. With help from Tip, he returns the Shusher, which is revealed to be an egg containing the entire next generation of Gorg. The lone Gorg inside the ship happily accepts the egg, as he is the last of his kind and he had been desperately searching for his children.

Two weeks later, the Boov move their colony to the Moon. Many Boov visit Earth and mingle with the humans, who are restored to their original homes. Oh moves in with the Tuccis, and invites many other aliens to visit Earth and attend his parties.

== Voice cast ==
- Jim Parsons as Oh, a Boov outcast
- Rihanna as Gratuity "Tip" Tucci, a 13-year-old girl who befriends Oh
- Steve Martin as Captain Smek, the leader of the Boov race
- Jennifer Lopez as Lucy Tucci, Tip's mother. This is Lopez's first collaboration with Johnson since her previous role as Azteca in the 1998 DreamWorks film, Antz.
- Matt Jones as Kyle, a grumpy Boov police officer and Smek's right-hand man who Oh thinks is his best friend.
- Brian Stepanek as the Gorg Commander, the leader and father of the Gorg races
  - Stepanek also voices some Boov.
- Frank Welker as Pig, Tip's pet Japanese Bobtail (uncredited)

April Lawrence and Nigel W. Tierney voice Boov Announcer and Child A, respectively.

== Production ==
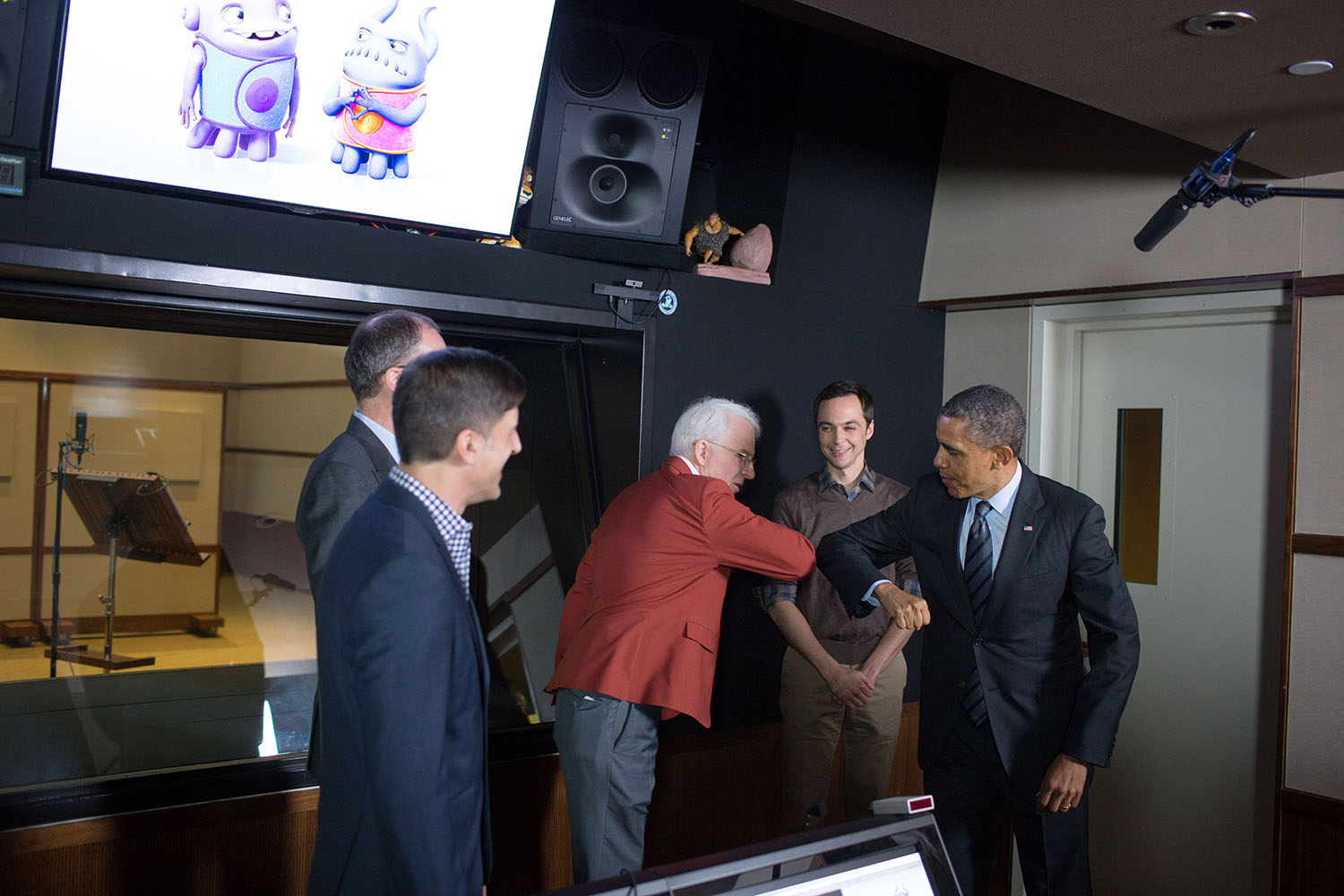
President Barack Obama visited DreamWorks Animation in November 2013, where he met with Steve Martin and Jim Parsons, who were recording lines for the film.

In 2008, DreamWorks Animation optioned the book's rights to adapt it into an animated feature film. On his blog, Adam Rex announced that DreamWorks renewed the option of the adaptation in 2011. On June 20, 2012, it was revealed that the title of the film would be Happy Smekday!, Jim Parsons and Rihanna would star in the lead roles, and the film would be released in the fourth quarter of 2014. In September 2012, 20th Century Fox and DreamWorks Animation announced a release date of November 26, 2014. In June 2013, the film was retitled from Happy Smekday! to Home.

It was the final DreamWorks Animation film to have Hewlett-Packard as the studio's preferred technology partner, as the company split into two entities, Hewlett Packard Enterprise for its enterprise product division and HP Inc. for its consumer division, on November 1, 2015.

=== Music ===
In addition to her voice role, Rihanna created a concept album for the film (also titled Home) which was released on March 13, 2015. It consists of eight original songs. The soundtrack's lead single, Rihanna's "Towards the Sun", premiered on BBC Radio 1 on February 9, 2015, and was made available for digital download the same day, via the iTunes Store. The second single, "Feel the Light", recorded by Lopez, was released on February 25, 2015, via the iTunes Store.

== Release ==
=== Theatrical ===
Home was initially scheduled for release on November 26, 2014. On May 20, 2014, the film's release date was pushed back to March 27, 2015, switching places with another DreamWorks Animation film, Penguins of Madagascar. DreamWorks Animation's CEO Jeffrey Katzenberg, said Penguins, coming from one of DWA's most successful franchises, would have an easier task to stand out around the Thanksgiving holiday season while Home was to try taking advantage of a less competitive spring release window and repeat successful spring launches of some of DWA's original films like The Croods and How to Train Your Dragon.

A 4-minute prequel short film called Almost Home was attached to theatrical showings of DreamWorks Animation's Mr. Peabody & Sherman in early 2014 and Blue Sky Studios' Rio 2 also in 2014. It was directed by Todd Wilderman and features a score composed by Lorne Balfe. The short shows the Boov and Captain Smek (again voiced by Steve Martin) in a sequence of unsuccessful attempts at finding a hospitable planet, before they finally come across the Earth. The film had its world premiere on March 7, 2015, for the first time to the public as the grand opening matinee of an international children's competition in the Championship Finals category for a young audience during the opening night of the Boulder International Film Festival Grand Opening Celebration's Fanfare Highlights Showcase event as a special BIFF headliner, becoming the first ever RealD 3D film in history to open the event and Boulder's "biggest opening night matinee in decades".

=== Home media ===
Home was released digitally on June 26, 2015, and came out on DVD, Blu-ray and Blu-ray 3D on July 28, 2015. In the United Kingdom, Home went to number one on the Official Video Chart in its first week of sale.

== Reception ==
=== Box office ===
Home grossed $177.4 million in North America and has grossed $208.6 million in other territories for a worldwide total of $386 million. Its production cost was $135 million, with a similar sum spent for prints and advertising (P&A). Deadline Hollywood calculated the net profit of the film to be $29.12 million, when factoring together all expenses and revenues for the film.

Home opened in the U.S. and Canada simultaneously with the comedy Get Hard on March 27, 2015. Though the latter earned higher in its Thursday late-night run, estimates were showing that Home was heading to No. 1 in its opening weekend. It scored one of the biggest opening days for a DreamWorks Animation non-sequel ever with $15.6 million, behind Kung Fu Panda ($20 million) and Monsters vs. Aliens ($16.75 million). Home debuted at the top of the box office, with $52.1 million, which exceeded predictions of a $30 million to $35 million opening and was also DreamWorks Animation's best opening since the $60.3 million debut of Madagascar 3: Europe's Most Wanted.

Outside North America, Home was released in 10 countries on March 20, 2015, a week ahead of its U.S. premiere. It earned $20.1 million, coming in third place at the international box office behind Cinderella and The Divergent Series: Insurgent. The following weekend, it expanded to 55 additional countries and grossed a total of $24 million from 11,250 screens in 64 countries. Its largest openings occurred in the UK, Ireland and Malta ($9.12 million), Russia ($5.17 million), Mexico ($3 million), Brazil ($2.3 million), Australia ($2.42 million), and Spain ($2.24 million).

=== Critical response ===
Review aggregation website Rotten Tomatoes gives the film a score of 53% based on reviews from 137 critics, with an average rating of 5.5/10. The website's consensus reads, "Colorful, silly, and utterly benign, Home is a passable diversion, but there's no shortage of superior animated alternatives." On Metacritic, which assigns a weighted average rating, the film has a score of 55 out of 100, based on 31 critics, indicating "mixed or average" reviews. In CinemaScore polls conducted during the opening weekend, cinema audiences gave Home an average grade of "A" on an A+ to F scale.

Michael Rechtshaffen of The Hollywood Reporter said, "There may be no place like home, but there are a lot of places like Home, an animated adventure about the unlikely friendship between a lonely girl and an alien misfit that can't help but feel familiar." James Rocchi of The Wrap gave the film a positive review, saying "As animated sci-fi for small fry, it's a success whose modest but well-executed ambitions are no small part of its charm." Stephen Whitty gave the film two out of five stars, saying "The Gummi-colored animation is imaginative, but director Tim Johnson's ho-hum 3D cartoon remains strictly 1D." Rafer Guzman of Newsday gave the film two out of four stars, saying "The film moves quickly and keeps the jokes coming, which only means that Home would rather keep young viewers occupied than give them something to think about." Ben Sachs of the Chicago Reader gave the film a negative review, saying "Aggressive and cynical approach to children's entertainment, pummeling viewers with mechanical-looking action sequences (which suggest video game demos), unfunny one-liners, and overly loud pop songs and sound effects." Claudia Puig of USA Today gave the film two out of five stars, saying "Key characters are admirably diverse, but the fast-paced tale is thoroughly predictable."

Soren Anderson of The Seattle Times gave the film two and a half stars out of four, saying "It works moderately well thanks largely to the voice talents of Jim Parsons and, to a lesser extent, Steve Martin. Two droll dudes who put a fair share of funny into this animated picture." Neil Genzlinger of The New York Times called the film "A charming concoction with positive messages for younger children about conquering fears, understanding outsiders and knowing yourself." Betsy Sharkey of the Los Angeles Times gave the film a negative review, saying "Tension is one of Home's biggest issues. There just isn't nearly enough of it. Story is another. Even a kids' movie needs more complexity and more invention." Linda Barnard of the Toronto Star gave the film two and a half stars out of four, saying "Aside from Parsons' initially amusingly mangled Yoda-like English, which gets a tad repetitive, Home doesn't stand out as fresh or particularly funny." Dana Rose Falcone of Entertainment Weekly gave the film an A−, saying "The combination of Home's layered message, fun score, and clever comedy make it a colorful choice for moviegoers of any age." Stephanie Zacharek of The Village Voice gave the film a mixed review, saying "If director Tim Johnson-adapting Adam Rex's book The True Meaning of Smekday-can't do much with the story's confused, if well-intentioned, agenda, at least he's got some charming, vivid characters to work with." Richard Roeper of the Chicago Sun-Times gave the film a C, saying "Anyone over 10 will see the plot twists a mile away. Kids will probably enjoy the goofy Boovs, the rainbows of colors and the music. Call me a traditionalist, but I still say the world was a better place before those darn Boovs invaded."

Peter Debruge of Variety gave the film a negative review, saying "From a creative standpoint, this is the studio's least exciting feature yet-hardly its worst, execution-wise, but entirely lacking in the risk-taking spirit that has spawned such successful franchises as Shrek, Kung Fu Panda and Dragons." Barbara VanDenburgh of The Arizona Republic gave the film two out of five stars, saying "For all its energy, razzle-dazzle and whiz-bang technology, it doesn't know how to tell a simple story or cobble together three-dimensional characters, and that's a problem not even the best of 3-D glasses can fix." Susan Wloszczyna of RogerEbert.com gave the film two out of four stars, saying "I kept thinking about Lilo & Stitch while watching Home, a decidedly disappointing effort based on the popular kid-lit book The True Meaning of Smekday from the already embattled folks at DreamWorks Animation."

=== Accolades ===
Award	Category	Recipients	Result
Annie Awards	Outstanding Achievement, Animated Effects in an Animated Production	Greg Gladstone, Tim Hoff, Mark Newport, Jason Rickwald, Stephen Wood	Nominated
Annie Awards	Outstanding Achievement, Character Animation in a Feature Production	Mark Donald	Nominated
Annie Awards	Outstanding Achievement, Production Design in an Animated Feature Production	Emil Mitev	Nominated
Black Reel Awards	Best Voice Performance	Rihanna	Won
Kids' Choice Awards	Favorite Animated Movie	Home	Nominated
Kids' Choice Awards	Favorite Voice From an Animated Movie	Jennifer Lopez	Nominated
Kids' Choice Awards	Favorite Voice From an Animated Movie	Jim Parsons	Nominated
People's Choice Awards	Favorite Animated Movie Voice	Rihanna	Nominated
People's Choice Awards	Favorite Family Movie	Home	Nominated
Visual Effects Society Awards	Outstanding Effects Simulations in an Animated Feature	Greg Gladstone, Michael Losure, Chris De St Jeor, Alex Timchenkio	Nominated
MovieGuide Awards	Best Movie for Families	Home	Won

== Television series ==
An animated series titled Home: Adventures with Tip & Oh was released on Netflix on July 29, 2016. Parsons and Rihanna did not reprise their roles as Oh and Tip. They are voiced by Mark Whitten and Rachel Crow respectively, although Matt Jones reprises his role of Kyle from the film. It was developed by Thurop Van Orman and Ryan Crego. The series left Netflix in April 2024.

== See also ==
- List of animated feature films of 2015
- The True Meaning of Smekday, a book on which the film is based
