= Jacob Plant =

British record producer and DJ (born 1991)

Jacob Plant (born 16 February 1991) is a British record producer and DJ. He's released on Ministry of Sound imprint label Speakerbox, Calvin Harris' Fly Eye Records and Steve Aoki's Dim Mak Records, and has been commissioned to officially remix songs for numerous high-profile artists including Rihanna, Calvin Harris, Tinie Tempah, Example, Axwell, Benny Benassi, Iggy Azalea and Sub Focus.

Plant has performed at several large festivals, including Reading and Leeds Festivals and Chicago's Lollapalooza festival in 2014. His debut EP, Warehouse, was released through his own label Shakedown Recordings. Jacob's music has earned playtime on BBC Radio 1 shows by DJs such as Annie Mac and Zane Lowe (who crowned "Fire" his Hottest Record in the World). His latest EP, Louder, was released in 2014 through Dim Mak Records.

== Discography ==
=== Extended plays ===
Title	Details	Track listing
Warehouse	Released: 2013; Label: Shakedown Recordings; Formats: Digital download	"Warehouse"; "Can't Hold Back"; "When I Say Go"
Louder	Released: 2014; Label: Dim Mak Records; Formats: Digital download	"Louder"; "Radar"; "Tell Them"

=== Singles ===
Year	Title	Peak chart positions			Album
Year	Title	UK	UK Dance	SCO	Album
2010	"Basslines In"	–	—	—	Non-album singles
2010	"Jump Up"	–	—	—	Non-album singles
2012	"Mosh Pit" (featuring Majestic)	–	—	—	Non-album singles
2013	"Shakedown"	–	—	—	Non-album singles
2013	"Fire"	–	—	—	Non-album singles
2015	"Ice Cream"	—	—	—	Non-album singles
2015	"All Night" (with Tujamo)	—	—	—	Non-album singles
2016	"Reflections" (featuring Example)	—	—	—	Non-album singles
2016	"Bike Engine" (featuring Stylo G)	—	—	—	Non-album singles
