= Music for Youth =

British charity

Music for Youth (MFY) is a British charity which provides free access to educational and performance opportunities for groups of young musicians and audiences through a series of festivals and concerts throughout the UK. Two million children have taken part in Music for Youth events since 1971. Sixty thousand 4- to 21-year-olds took part in 76 Music for Youth festivals and concerts in 2006, with 85% of these coming from state schools. Each year MFY aims to work with 100,000 young musicians.

== History ==
Music for Youth (MFY) was founded in 1970, the first event staged was the National Festival on 10 and 11 July 1971 at the Lyceum on the Strand, London. Following this a nationwide series of Regional Festivals were introduced and there was an increase in entries for the second National Festival in Fairfield Halls, Croydon, in 1972. The National Festival moved to London's South Bank Centre in 1981 and to Birmingham in 2005. The first Schools Prom (now called the MFY Prom) was held at the Royal Albert Hall in November 1975.

== Festivals ==
=== Regional Festivals ===
These annual festivals run from February to April. The Regional Festivals are the gateway to the MFY season, are free to take part and open to any group of two or more aged 21 and under. Festivals are held at a wide range of venues across the country and groups at any stage of their musical journey can take part.

=== National Festival ===
Each year the National Festival is held in Birmingham. The festival runs for seven days and involves around 8,000 young musicians.

=== MFY Proms ===
The MFY Proms at the Royal Albert Hall celebrate music-making by young musicians, singers and dancers from the UK. 3,000 young performers perform over three days. The children play to audiences of up to 14,000 and the bands range from boy-bands to symphony orchestras.

=== Showcase music ===
MFY groups perform at major political, business, industry and education events. Events include the Junior Ignite at the Royal Albert Hall, the National Union of Teachers Annual Conference, the TUC Congress and the major party political conferences.

=== Inspiration series ===
MFY also runs a range of events such as the Primary Proms, Secondary Proms, Upbeat and a Family Concert.

== Celebrity involvement ==
Throughout the years MFY has had many guest performers including John Dankworth, Ronnie Scott, Don Lusher, Humphrey Lyttelton, Andrew Lloyd Webber, John Williams, Rick Wakeman, Tim Rice, Julian Lloyd Webber, Kenny Baker and Malcolm Arnold. Past performers include Evelyn Glennie, Nigel Kennedy, Thomas Adès, John Harle and Gary Barlow.
