= Towards the Sun (song) =

Single by Rihanna

from the album Home: Original Motion Picture Soundtrack
- Released: February 9, 2015
- Recorded: 2014
- Studio: The Canvas Room (London, England)
- Genre: Pop; R&B
- Length: 4:33
- Label: Westbury Road
- Songwriters: Tiago Carvalho; Gary Go; Robyn Fenty
- Producers: Tiago; Gary Go; Kuk Harrell

Rihanna singles chronology
"FourFiveSeconds" (2015)	"Towards the Sun" (2015)	"Bitch Better Have My Money" (2015)

"Towards the Sun" is a song by Barbadian singer Rihanna for the soundtrack to the 2015 film Home, in which she voices main character Tip. The song was premiered on BBC Radio 1 on February 9, 2015, and it was released for digital download as the soundtrack's lead single the same day by Westbury Road. The song was sent to mainstream radio on March 17, 2015 in the US. The song was written and produced by Tiago Carvalho and Gary Go, with additional writing by Rihanna.

"Towards the Sun" is a mid-tempo pop and R&B ballad with positive and optimistic lyrics. On release, it received positive reviews from music critics who praised Rihanna's vocals and compared the song to the works of the British band Coldplay and their 2012 collaboration with Rihanna, "Princess of China". Commercially the song was a moderate success, peaking at 76 on the UK Singles Chart and 22 on the French singles chart.

It was later heard in a promo for the superhero drama miniseries Heroes Reborn.

== Background ==
In June 2012, it was announced that Rihanna would star in the lead role in the film Happy Smekday! with the American actor Jim Parsons. In September 2012, 20th Century Fox and DreamWorks Animation announced that the movie would be released on November 26, 2014. In June 2013, the film was retitled from Happy Smekday! to Home. On May 20, 2014, the film's release date was pushed back to March 27, 2015, switching places with DreamWorks Animation's film Penguins of Madagascar. In 2014, Variety magazine reported that in addition to her voice role, Rihanna had created a concept album for the film which was to be released on March 13, 2015. It was later reported that the film's soundtrack would also include songs recorded by Charli xcx, Kiesza, and Jennifer Lopez (who also stars in the film). "Towards the Sun" was written by Tiago Carvalho, Gary Go and Rihanna. Scott Mills premiered the song on BBC Radio 1 on February 9, 2015 and it was made available for digital download the same day on the iTunes Store. It was sent to the US Top 40/Mainstream radio on March 3, 2015.

== Composition and lyrics ==
"Towards the Sun" is a mid-tempo pop and R&B ballad with a length of four minutes and thirty-three seconds. The single has "pounding" drums, sing-along lyrics, "gigantic" chorus, "layered harmonies", "swirling effects" and uplifting, positive lyrics. Nolan Feeney of Time noted that the song features "a children's choir and otherwordly [sic] atmospherics". Andrew Trendell of Gigwise described it as a "slow-burning stomper of a number, loaded with huge drums and arena backing vocals", further comparing it to the works of the British band Coldplay. Daniel Welsh of The Huffington Post UK agreed with Trendell about the Coldplay comparison and linked the song to the band's 2012 collaboration with Rihanna, "Princess of China". Jason Lipshutz of Billboard compared the song's mid-tempo groove to the one on the singer's 2012 single, "Diamonds". New York Post's Jaclyn Hendricks noted that the song has a "livelier" production than Rihanna's previous single, her collaboration with Kanye West and Paul McCartney, "FourFiveSeconds" (2015).

Madison Vain of Entertainment Weekly opined that the song is "anthemic" and "whispier" than Rihanna's previous singles. According to Brittany Spanos of Rolling Stone, the song is more optimistic and positive than her previous singles and albums which could be heard in the lines, "Turn your face towards the sun. Let the shadows fall behind you." According to Welsh the song's lyrics are "seriously empowering" and "very dramatic stuff". MTV News' Brenna Enrlich called the song "heroic" in which Rihanna is clearly singing to turn the face to the shadows and look at the sun.

== Critical reception ==
Daniel Welsh of The Huffington Post UK praised "Towards the Sun"'s lyrics, its production, Rihanna's voice on the song and its chorus. According to him, "with the theatrical atmosphere of the track, we can imagine the chorus will sound particularly anthemic being sung by a stadium crowd". Spin's Brennan Carley called the song "bombastic" and also praised its chorus and the "anthemic" nature. Trendell noted, "The result is no less than epic and triumphant. Expect this to soundtrack many a victory this summer." Spanos praised Rihanna's falsetto on the song and called the track "epic" and "empowering".

== Credits and personnel ==
Credits adapted from the liner notes of Home.

Locations

- Recorded at The Canvas Room, London
- Mixed at Larabee Studios, North Hollywood, Los Angeles

Personnel

- Lead vocals – Rihanna
- Songwriting – Tiago Carvalho, Gary Go, Robyn Fenty
- Production – Tiago
- Co-production – Gary Go
- Additional vocals and instrumentation – Tiago, Gary Go
- Choir – Ifield Community College Choir
- Choir master – Patrick Allen
- Engineer – Andreas Eide Larsen
- Assistant engineer – B.B. Banks
- Vocal production – Kuk Harrell
- Recording – Marcos Tovar, Kuk Harrell
- Mixing – Manny Marroquin
- Assistant mixing – Chris Galland, Jeff Jackson, Ike Schultz

== Charts ==
Chart (2015)	Peak position
Belgium (Ultratip Bubbling Under Flanders)	56
Belgium (Ultratip Bubbling Under Wallonia)	32
CIS Airplay (TopHit)	141
France (SNEP)	22
Scottish Singles Sales (Official Charts)	42
Slovakia Airplay (ČNS IFPI)	52
UK Singles (Official Charts)	76
Ukraine Airplay (TopHit)	71
US Kid Digital Songs (Billboard)	1

== Certifications ==
Certifications for "Towards the Sun"
Region	Certification	Certified units/sales
Australia (ARIA)	Gold	35,000^{‡}
^{‡} Sales+streaming figures based on certification alone.

== Release history ==
Country	Date	Format	Label	Ref.
Australia	February 9, 2015	Digital download	Westbury Road	
Canada	February 9, 2015	Digital download	Westbury Road	
France	February 9, 2015	Digital download	Westbury Road	
Germany	February 9, 2015	Digital download	Westbury Road	
Ireland	February 9, 2015	Digital download	Westbury Road	
Italy	February 9, 2015	Digital download	Westbury Road	
New Zealand	February 9, 2015	Digital download	Westbury Road	
Spain	February 9, 2015	Digital download	Westbury Road	
United Kingdom	February 9, 2015	Digital download	Westbury Road	
United States	February 9, 2015	Digital download	Westbury Road	
United Kingdom	March 2, 2015	Mainstream radio		
