= Nobody's Business (song) =

2012 song by Rihanna featuring Chris Brown

Song by Rihanna featuring Chris Brown

from the album Unapologetic
- Released: November 19, 2012
- Recorded: 2012
- Studio: Sarm (London); Westlake (Los Angeles)
- Genre: Dance; disco-pop; disco house; pop; club; R&B-funk
- Length: 3:36
- Label: Def Jam; SRP
- Songwriters: Terius Nash; Robyn Fenty; Carlos McKinney
- Producers: The-Dream; Carlos McKinney

Audio
- "Nobody's Business" on YouTube

"Nobody's Business" is a song by Barbadian singer Rihanna featuring American singer Chris Brown from the former's seventh studio album, Unapologetic (2012). It is their third collaboration following Brown's felony assault on Rihanna in 2009. Rihanna wrote the song with its producers The-Dream and Carlos McKinney. It became available on November 19, 2012, when the album was released by Def Jam Recordings and SRP Records. An upbeat dance, disco-pop, disco house, pop, club, and R&B-funk song, "Nobody's Business" mixes Chicago stepping and features strings, piano, a four-on-the-floor kick drum, and an interpolation of Michael Jackson's 1987 single "The Way You Make Me Feel".

"Nobody's Business" received generally positive reviews from music critics, with many of them labeling the song as a standout on the album. Despite that, some journalists criticized Rihanna's decision to collaborate with Brown again after his violence against her. Following the release of Unapologetic, as a result of strong digital downloads, the song charted on multiple charts worldwide; it peaked at numbers 19 and 14 on the bubbling under charts in the Flanders and Wallonia regions of Belgium, number 36 in France, number 63 on the UK Singles Chart, number 7 on the UK Hip Hop and R&B Singles Chart, and number 39 on the US Hot R&B/Hip-Hop Songs chart. It was certified platinum in Australia and New Zealand, gold in Denmark, and silver in the United Kingdom.

== Background and production ==
On February 8, 2009, Rihanna's scheduled performance at the 51st Annual Grammy Awards was canceled. Reports surfaced of an altercation with her then-boyfriend, singer Chris Brown, who was arrested on suspicion of making criminal threats. On March 5, 2009, Brown was charged with assault and making criminal threats. On June 22, Brown pleaded guilty to felony assault and accepted a plea deal of community labor, five years of probation, and domestic violence counseling. On August 25, Brown received five years of probation. He was ordered to attend one year of domestic violence counseling and undergo six months of community service. The judge retained a five-year restraining order on Brown, which required him to remain 50 yards away from Rihanna, reduced to 10 yards at public events.

In January 2012, Rihanna was planning to remix the interlude "Birthday Cake" from her 2011 studio album Talk That Talk. On February 15, 2012, Kosine of Da Internz, the producer of the interlude, stated that the featured collaborator would "shock the world", and that the full-length version would premiere between February 16 and February 20, 2012. The full-length version of "Birthday Cake" featured Brown and was released on Rihanna's birthday, February 20, 2012. Subsequently, Rihanna lent her vocals to the remix of Brown's 2012 single "Turn Up the Music". Rihanna's decision to collaborate with Brown after the 2009 assault was largely criticized by the media.

In March 2012, Rihanna began "working on the new sound" for her seventh album, though she had not yet begun recording. On September 12, 2012, Def Jam France announced via Twitter that Rihanna would release a new single the upcoming week, and her next album was scheduled to be released in November 2012. On October 11, 2012, in one of Rihanna's tweets, she revealed the title of her new album, Unapologetic, along with its cover. On November 6, the singer posted the official track listing of the album, which included a song titled "Nobody's Business" that featured Brown. Rihanna co-wrote the song with the producers The-Dream and Carlos McKinney. Bart Schoudel recorded the track at Sarm Studios in London and Westlake Recording Studios in Los Angeles. The vocal recording of "Nobody's Business" was done by Kuk Harrell and Marcos Tovar; Harrell also did the vocal production of the song. Blake Mares and Robert Cohen were assistant vocal engineers on the track. It was mixed at Larabee Studios in Los Angeles by Manny Marroquin.

== Composition and lyrical interpretation ==
"Nobody's Business"
A 23-second sample of "Nobody's Business", which has been characterized by critics as a disco-pop, pop, and R&B-funk song that mixes Chicago stepping and house styles and features strings, piano, and a four-on-the-floor kick drum.

"Nobody's Business" is an upbeat dance, disco-pop, disco house, pop, club, and R&B-funk song with a length of three minutes and thirty-six seconds. Music critic Smokey D. Fontaine described it as "a perfect blend of R&B soul and pop feel-good with an irresistible sing-in-the-shower falsetto hook". The track contains an interpolation of Michael Jackson's 1987 single "The Way You Make Me Feel". Additionally, it has disco-driven influences, a 1980s R&B sound, and a "funkified" quick tempo. Greg Kot of Chicago Tribune wrote that "Nobody's Business" mixes Chicago stepping and house styles and features strings, piano, and a four-on-the-floor kick drum. The Billboard staff described it as a "wonderfully catchy throwback to early-90s club music", while Dan Martin of NME called it a swinging summer jam. Writing for The New York Times, Jon Caramanica stated that "Nobody's Business" is gelatinous, smooth, and carefree.

Genevieve Koski of The A.V. Club labeled the duet as an "eminently danceable paean to forbidden love". Lyrically, the couple proclaim their eternal fealty, make out in a Lexus, and acknowledge to the world that their romantic relationship is their business alone. According to a Billboard reviewer, lines like "you'll always be the one I want to come home to" and "you'll always be my baby" "[make] the beyond-complicated circumstances of their history impossible to ignore". Stacy-Ann Ellis of Vibe wrote that the song, like the couple's first post-relationship collaboration, "Birthday Cake (Remix)", is about the history they share and "refuse to let go of—it'll irk some people". Digital Spy's Robert Copsey noted that vocally, Brown appears to attempt a Michael Jackson impression. Robert Leedham of Drowned in Sound stated that "Nobody's Business" "makes you want to write a long, worthy think piece so you can come to terms with your own moral standing on it".

== Response ==
=== Commercial performance ===
In North America, "Nobody's Business" peaked at number 39 on the US Hot R&B/Hip-Hop Songs chart. In Europe, it peaked at number 19 and 14 on the Bubbling Under charts in the Flanders and Wallonia regions of Belgium, number 36 in France, number 63 on the UK Singles Chart, and number 7 on the UK Hip Hop and R&B Singles Chart. It was certified Gold by IFPI Danmark and Silver by the British Phonographic Industry (BPI). In Oceania, it was certified Platinum by the Australian Recording Industry Association (ARIA) and Recorded Music NZ (RMNZ).

=== Critical reception ===
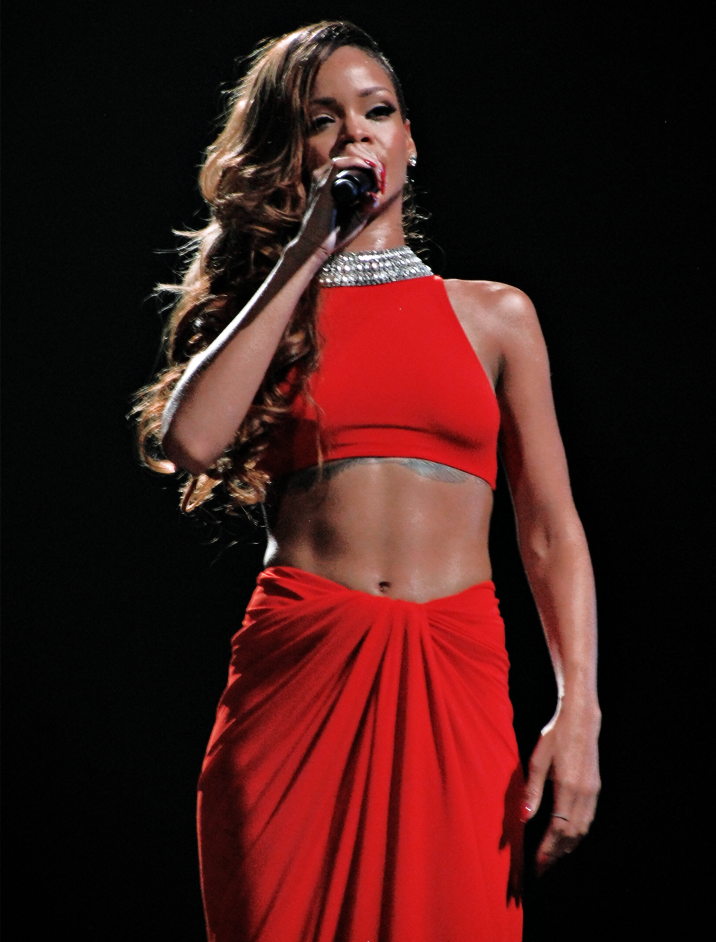
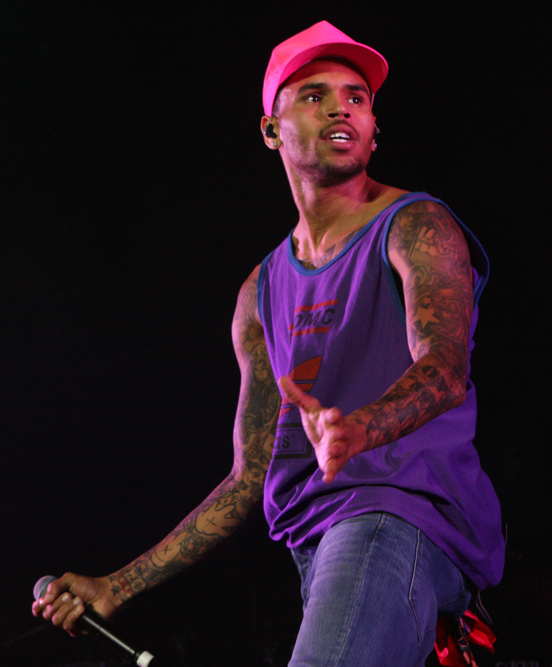
The media criticized Rihanna's (left) decision to collaborate with Chris Brown (right) following their 2009 domestic violence case.

"Nobody's Business" received generally positive reviews from music critics. Brad Stern of MTV Buzzworthy wrote that although the collaboration was controversial, the song is one of the album's standouts. Copsey of Digital Spy, Ellis of Vibe, and Leedham of Drowned in Sound agreed with Stern; Leedham stated, "On an album that's mildly abrasive and not a lot of fun, its piano-led stomp and teasing vocal interplay are actually enjoyable". Similarly, Pitchfork's Jessica Hooper recognized it as one of the high points of Unapologetic. Caramanica of The New York Times wrote that it is the most tender, affectionate, spirited song on the record: "On an album full of dyspeptic relationships, it is the breath of cool, nourishing air". Jon Reyes of HipHopDX wrote that the song is "a very well thought out move, probably in hopes that it would help soften the impending criticism that Rihanna would receive from singing the pop version of makeup sex with her abusive ex-boyfriend".

Reviewers also noted and praised the interpolation of Michael Jackson's song on the track. Fontaine named "Nobody's Business" the album's best track, further stating that Jackson's 1989 single "Leave Me Alone" "ain't got nothing" on "Nobody's Business". A Billboard reviewer praised Jackson's influence in the song and stated that it is hard to resist its charm. Koski of The A.V. Club deemed "Nobody's Business" one of the strongest tracks on the album and compared it to songs from Jackson's seventh studio album, Bad (1987). The Huffington Post's Mesfin Fekadu praised Jackson's sample on the track; however, he dismissed the track's lyrical content.

Critics were divided on Rihanna's decision to collaborate with Brown again. Toronto Star's Lucas Oleniuk stated that "Nobody's Business" was not a bad track, writing that "it's one of the catchiest and freshest-sounding here—but the troubling subtext is as irksome as the irony of titling a song that proudly makes the pair's business everybody's". Bernard Perusse of Montreal Gazette noted that although it was a pretty fair R&B smoker, the message was nauseating and sinister. Being more critical of the collaboration, Randall Roberts of the Los Angeles Times wrote that the track represented a sad inversion of the 1965 single "I Got You Babe" by Sonny & Cher, further noting that "instead of singing about connection, true love and wanting to shout it to the world, the song features a convicted abuser and the woman he assaulted asking everyone to shut up and leave them alone".

== Credits and personnel ==
Credits are adapted from the liner notes of Unapologetic.

=== Recording ===
- Music recording – Sarm Studios, London; Westlake Recording Studios Los Angeles
- Mixing – Larabee Studios, Los Angeles

=== Sample ===
- Contains interpolation from the composition "The Way You Make Me Feel" as written and performed by Michael Jackson courtesy of Mijac Music/Sony/ATV Songs LLC (BMI)

=== Personnel ===
- Songwriting – Terius Nash, Robyn Fenty, Carlos McKinney
- Production – The-Dream, Carlos McKinney
- Featured artist – Chris Brown
- Recording engineers – Bart Schoudel
- Vocal recording – Kuk Harrell, Marcos Tovar
- Vocal production – Kuk Harrell
- Assistant vocal engineering – Blake Mares, Robert Cohen
- Mixing – Manny Marroquin

== Charts ==
Chart performance for "Nobody's Business"
Chart (2012)	Peak position
Belgium (Ultratip Bubbling Under Flanders)	19
Belgium (Ultratip Bubbling Under Wallonia)	14
France (SNEP)	36
UK Singles (Official Charts)	63
UK Hip Hop/R&B (Official Charts)	7
US Hot R&B/Hip-Hop Songs (Billboard)	39

== Certifications ==
Certifications for "Nobody's Business"
Region	Certification	Certified units/sales
Australia (ARIA)	Platinum	70,000^{‡}
Denmark (IFPI Danmark)	Gold	45,000^{‡}
New Zealand (RMNZ)	Platinum	30,000^{‡}
United Kingdom (BPI)	Silver	200,000^{‡}
^{‡} Sales+streaming figures based on certification alone.
