= Unapologetic =

Studio album by Rihanna
- Released: November 19, 2012
- Recorded: June–November 2012
- Studios: Westlake (Los Angeles); Sarm Studios (London); Metropolis Studios (London); Roc the Mic (New York); Triangle (Atlanta); NightBird (West Hollywood)
- Genres: Pop; synth-pop; R&B
- Length: 55:06
- Labels: Roc Nation; SRP; Def Jam
- Producers: Benny Blanco; Brian Kennedy; Carlos McKinney; Chase & Status; David Guetta; Elof Loelv; Flippa123; Future; Giorgio Tuinfort; Justin Parker; Labrinth; Luney Tunez; Mex Menny; Mike Will Made It; Mikey Mike; Mikky Ekko; Naughty Boy; Nicky Romero; No I.D.; Oak; Parker Ighile; Andrew "Pop" Wansel; Stargate; Terius "The-Dream" Nash

Rihanna chronology
Talk That Talk (2011)	Unapologetic (2012)	Anti (2016)

Singles from Unapologetic
- 1. "Diamonds" Released: September 26, 2012; 2. "Stay" Released: December 13, 2012; 3. "Pour It Up" Released: January 8, 2013; 4. "Right Now" Released: May 28, 2013; 5. "What Now" Released: August 29, 2013

Unapologetic is the seventh studio album by Barbadian singer Rihanna. It was released on November 19, 2012 by Def Jam Recordings, SRP Records, and Roc Nation. It was recorded between June and November 2012, during the promotion of her sixth studio album, Talk That Talk (2011). As executive producer, Rihanna enlisted previous collaborators The-Dream, David Guetta, Chase & Status, and Stargate to work alongside new collaborators such as Parker Ighile, Mike Will Made It, and Labrinth. Unapologetic is primarily a pop, synth-pop, and R&B record that incorporates elements of hip hop, EDM, dubstep, rock and reggae in its production, merging the sound of her previous albums Talk That Talk, Loud (2010) and Rated R (2009).

Unapologetic received generally mixed reviews from critics, with some reviewers describing its music as interesting, while others criticized its weak lyrical content and rushed nature. The album won the Grammy Award for Best Urban Contemporary Album at the 2014 ceremony, while "Stay" was nominated for Best Pop Duo/Group Performance. It debuted at number one on the US Billboard 200 with first-week sales of 238,000 copies, becoming Rihanna's first number one album on the chart and best-selling debut week of her career. The album also became the singer's third, fourth, and fifth consecutive number one album in the United Kingdom, Norway, and Switzerland, respectively. According to the International Federation of the Phonographic Industry (IFPI), it was the ninth global best-selling album of 2012 with sales of 2.3 million copies. As of December 2014, Unapologetic has sold over four million copies worldwide.

The album produced six singles, including the international hits "Diamonds" and "Stay". The former peaked at number one on both the UK Singles Chart and the US Billboard Hot 100, where it became Rihanna's twelfth number one song, tying her with Madonna and the Supremes for fourth most number one songs in the history of the chart. Prior to its release, Rihanna promoted the album with the 777 Tour which consisted of a seven-date promotional tour in which she performed seven concerts each in a different city in North America and Europe in seven days. To further promote the album, Rihanna embarked on her fourth worldwide concert tour, entitled the Diamonds World Tour.

== Background ==
In November 2011, Rihanna released her sixth studio album, Talk That Talk. The album was rooted in pop, dance and R&B, but also incorporated a variety of other musical genres such as hip hop, electro house, dancehall, and dubstep, a genre which was prominent on her fourth studio album, Rated R (2009). Talk That Talk received generally positive reviews from music critics upon its release. It was a commercial success and reached the top ten in over twenty national charts, including number one on the UK Albums Chart and number three on the US Billboard 200. The album produced six singles, including the worldwide hits "We Found Love" and "Where Have You Been". "We Found Love" topped the charts in over 25 countries and sold over 9 million copies worldwide, making it one of the best-selling singles of all time. In March 2012, Rihanna revealed that although she had not yet begun recording, she started "working on the new sound" for her seventh studio album.

== Recording and production ==
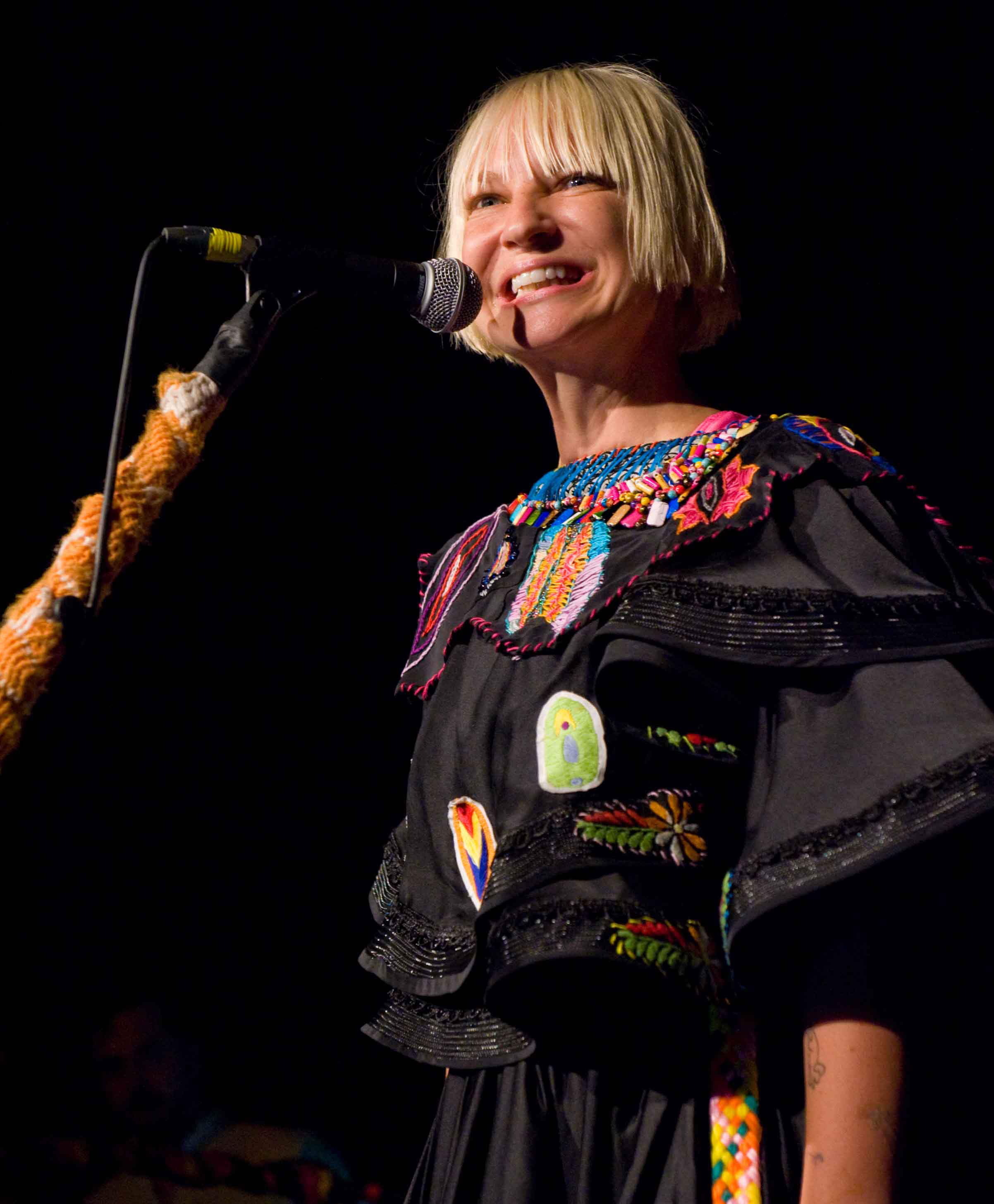
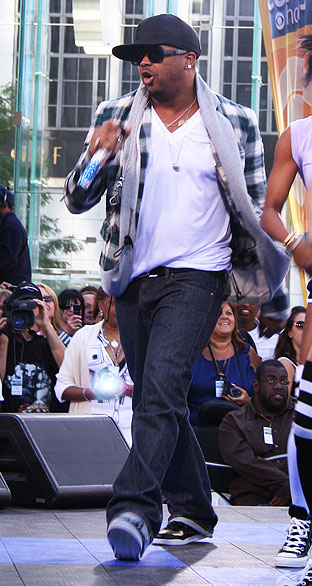
Sia (left) and The-Dream (right) both worked with Rihanna on Unapologetic.

On June 20, 2012, Rihanna began recording her seventh studio album, working with Nicky Romero and Burns. Rihanna and Burns booked three days in a studio in London while Rihanna was performing at Radio 1's Hackney Weekend. On 6 July, Def Jam executive No I.D. revealed that he had begun working with Rihanna on the album saying "I'm going in next week for about a week". On July 10, British singer and producer Labrinth revealed to Capital FM that he had been working with Rihanna on the album. On 17 July, it was reported that Rihanna would be working with R&B singer Ne-Yo and N-Dubz member Fazer. In an interview with Capital FM Ne-Yo spoke on working with Rihanna on the album saying: "I just recently went in to do some stuff for Rihanna, you know. She's the hardest working woman in showbiz right now. She's in the process of putting together a new album as we speak, I got in with Stargate and David Guetta and a few other people for that project.

In July 2012, Sean Garrett confirmed that he had been in the studio with French DJ David Guetta working on Rihanna's album saying: "I was in the studio with David doing some stuff for Rihanna recently. He finds inspiration in the things I don't like, and I get excited by the things he doesn't like. He wants to be more urban and I want to be more international, so we push each other, I try to help Rihanna. She works hard and it's cool to write for someone who is so open-minded." On 21 August, American songwriter Claude Kelly said that he had been writing songs for Rihanna while she was performing in London. Kelly spoke on the songs that he had written for Rihanna saying: "Rihanna's a worldwide superstar at this point and she's performing in stadiums and arenas now, so I wanted songs that reflected her audience, when I was in London she was performing at a festival in front of like 30,000 to 40,000 people. So I didn't want small songs that only worked on radio, so I tried to do anthemic big stadium-themed songs." On 16 August, British R&B singer-songwriter Angel stated that he had been writing for Rihanna's album. He said: "I love writing songs and it's good to pitch tracks to other artists. A couple of weeks ago I was doing some writing for Rihanna". In September 2012, Ne-Yo confirmed his involvement the album saying "I did go in the studio with her, I know I got one or two on the album that she's definitely keeping."

== Composition ==
=== Music and lyrics ===
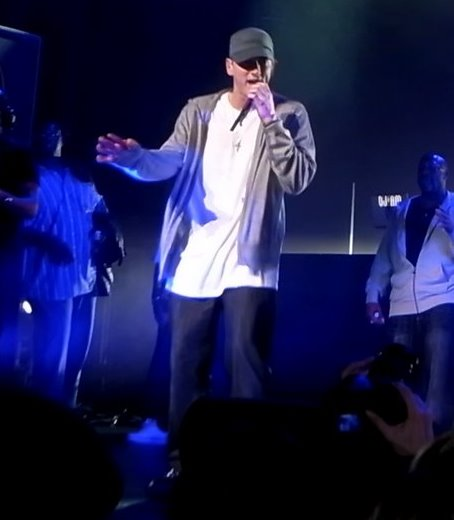
American rapper Eminem is featured on the track "Numb", marking the pair's third collaboration following the worldwide hit, "Love the Way You Lie" and its sequel (2010).

Rihanna explained her interest in developing new soundscapes, "I love experimenting and I love working with different sounds and putting them together so they're not one-dimensional." She also added "Right now we're working on collecting and creating the sound first before we even start working on the lyrical direction or melodies. I kind of have an idea though, and it's very rough right now. So I'm very eager to start that." Sean Garrett spoke on the album's sound saying it was "a great mish-mash of genres". Rihanna revealed during an interview with GQ's "Men of the Year" that she wanted her music to be uplifting saying "I want to make music that's hopeful, uplifting. Nothing corny or supersentimental. I just want it to have the feeling that brings you out of whatever you're going through. I want it to spark that fire. I want it to be real, authentic, and raw."

The album's first half is made up of EDM and "syrupy" Southern hip hop minimalism songs, which feature abrasive sound effects and eccentric beats. Like most of the album, they generally draw on dubstep, a bass-heavy subgenre typified by wobbly synthetic noises and blaring bass drops, as well as dance-pop and chopped and screwed sounds. Jon Caramanica of The New York Times characterizes the album's music as "brutish and bruised" with "tough and layered" production, citing David Guetta's "guttural" production on "Phresh Out the Runway" and "Right Now" as an example. Music journalist Jude Rogers characterized the album's music as voluminous "R&B-pop", while Time magazine's Melissa Locker said that it has an "urban R&B sound". According to Alexis Petridis, the different producers who worked on Unapologetic appeared to make an effort away from Rihanna's previous "pop-dance template ... or at least to rearrange voguish sounds into less familiar shapes". Unapologetic's ballad-oriented second half incorporates disco, reggae, and rock styles. According to music critic Greg Kot, Unapologetic is "ostensibly" a pop album, while Vibe said that it is "on the surface" an assortment of genres such as R&B, dubstep and pop.

Up-tempo songs such as "Phresh Out the Runway", "Jump", and "Pour It Up" celebrate the pleasure of living. Much of the album's lyrics are presumably concerned with Rihanna's relationship with Chris Brown, with a second half of lighter songs that have references to a dysfunctional love life. The album's subject matter is reflected by an abundance of minor key sounds throughout its songs. James Reed of The Boston Globe called Unapologetic "a defiant middle finger to her critics, particularly the ones who don't approve of her relationship with Brown." Kot observed a "celebrity subtext" throughout the album and characterized the songs' narrators as "troubled, anxiety-ridden, lost ... the characters in these songs linger in a limbo of mixed emotions, emotionally attracted to a lover and yet uneasy about the next step." Spin magazine's Caryn Ganz wrote that "Rihanna sings about her unapologetic love of" money, love, and "living in the moment" on the songs "Pour It Up", "Loveeeeeee Song", and "Right Now", respectively.

=== Songs and lyrical content ===
The album's opening track, "Phresh Out the Runway", is a "gritty club banger" that features hip hop and EDM styles. The song is a "noisy, trap-tastic twerker" that is reminiscent of Rihanna's 2012 single "Birthday Cake", and contains "blazin' beats, brags aplenty" and an "unapologetic attitude". The song's lyrical content revolves around Rihanna explaining how if any of her crew does not respect her, then they should no longer remain with her. "Diamonds" is a mid-tempo ballad which incorporates electronic and pop musical genres. It features heavy synthesizers, orchestral sounds and electronic rhythms. The song's lyrical content marks a departure from the recurring themes of unhealthy relationships on the album's other songs, and contains a prominent concept of love.

"Numb" is a "slow-grinding, Middle Eastern-flavored party track". "Pour It Up" is a club song, with a minimal hip hop beat. Lyrically, it finds Rihanna turning a strip-club anthem into a declaration of independence, pulling out her dollar bills at the strip club, getting drunk, and bragging loudly. "Loveeeeeee Song" is a duet with rapper and singer Future, with soft vocals by Rihanna and lyrics that posit love as an adversarial game. "Jump" is a dubstep-influenced dance song that samples Ginuwine's 1996 song "Pony". Lyrically, in "Jump" Rihanna preaches to her former partner that she won't be chasing him. "Right Now" is a "feel-good anthem for the clubs". The song contains electronic and dance music, with a duration of 3 minutes and 1 second.

"Nobody's Business"
A 25-second sample of "Nobody's Business", which has been characterized by critics as a disco-pop, pop and R&B-funk song that mixes Chicago stepping and house styles and features strings, piano, and a four-on-the-floor kick drum.

"What Now", produced by Parker Ighile, is a "vulnerable ballad" containing a "hard chorus". The song is a piano-led mid tempo pop ballad and "builds nicely from its calming verse to its electrified hook". "Stay" is a ballad that has piano and guitar instrumentation. The lyrics revolve around "failing to resist true love", according to Dan Martin for NME "Nobody's Business" mixes Chicago stepping and house styles, featuring strings, piano, and a four-on-the-floor kick drum. Rihanna said that the song's lyrics show "basically the way I look at everything regarding my personal life." Lyrically, the couple proclaims their eternal fealty, make out in a Lexus and acknowledge the world that the romantic relationship between them is only their business.

"Love Without Tragedy / Mother Mary" represent two electronica and new wave integrated songs, which last for a duration of 6:58 with lyrics that are deeply personal, two-part song that opens with a somber mood and shifts to confessional subject matter and Rihanna's uplifting vocals. "Get It Over With" is a down-tempo, "chilled-out" song. "No Love Allowed" is a reggae song with a "bubbly, dubbed-out groove". The final track "Lost in Paradise" is a "somber-but-hopeful" mid-tempo ballad with frequent tempo drops. Lyrically, it speaks about a love stronger than a gun shot, "Half of Me" is a chamber pop song which lasts for a duration of three minutes and twelve seconds.

== Singles ==
"Diamonds"
A 25-second sample of the chorus of "Diamonds", an electronic and soul-inspired mid-tempo ballad, featuring drums and heavy synthesizers.

"Diamonds" premiered on September 26, 2012, and was released the following day as the lead single from Unapologetic. Critics were divided on the track; some complimented Rihanna's different musical direction, however, others criticized its production. The cover artwork for the song features Rihanna rolling diamonds on a piece of marijuana paper. The song's music video depicts Rihanna in four environments that represent the elements of earth, air, water and fire. "Diamonds" debuted at number 16 on the US Billboard Hot 100 chart, eventually reaching number one, giving Rihanna her twelfth number one in the country and tying her with Madonna and the Supremes as the artists with the fifth-most number ones in the chart's history. The song also topped the charts in eighteen other countries worldwide including Austria, Canada, France, Germany, and the United Kingdom.

"Stay", which features guest vocals by American recording artist Mikky Ekko was released as the second international single from the album, first impacting radio stations in France on December 13, 2012. Dan Martin for NME thought that the lyrical content of "Stay" puts a "vulnerable spin" on her relationship with Chris Brown. The song's accompanying music video was released on February 11, 2013, via E! and then to Vevo the following day. The song reached the top five of twenty-four countries worldwide including number four in the UK and number three on the US Billboard Hot 100, becoming Rihanna's twenty-fourth top ten on the latter chart, thus passing Whitney Houston's tally of 23 top ten songs. Furthermore, it reached number one in Canada, Czech Republic and Denmark, while also topping the US Pop Songs chart.

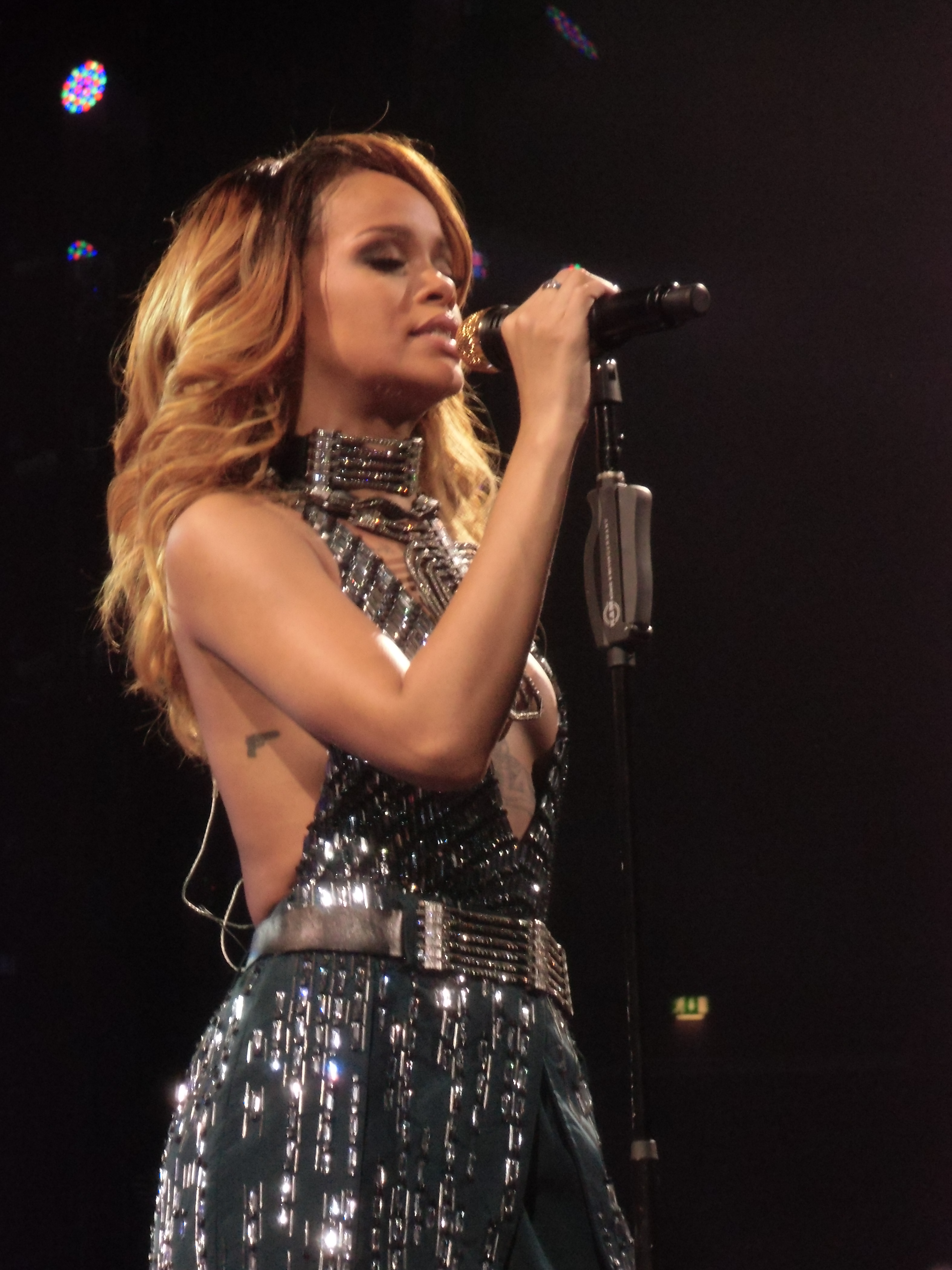
Rihanna performing "Diamonds" during her Diamonds World Tour in 2013

"Pour It Up" was solicited to urban radio as the album's third single in the United States on 8 January 2013. The song debuted on the US Billboard Hot 100 at number 90, eventually reaching a top twenty peak of number 19. "Pour It Up" additionally charted on multiple sub-charts in the country including number one and six on the Hot R&B/Hip-Hop Airplay and Hot R&B/Hip-Hop Songs charts, and number 47 on the Hot Dance Club Songs chart. It also made appearances in other countries such as Canada, France and the UK. A remix of "Pour It Up" was later distributed with rap verses from American rappers Young Jeezy, Rick Ross, Juicy J, and T.I. On October 2, 2013, an accompanying music video was released to Rihanna's official Vevo account after several delays.

"Right Now" was released as the fourth single from the album and was sent to contemporary hit radio in the United States on May 28, 2013. Upon the release of Unapologetic, the song charted at number one on the US Billboard Hot Dance Club Songs chart and number seven on the UK Dance Chart.

"What Now" was released as the fifth and final single from the album in selected countries; it peaked at number 21 and 13 in Australia and New Zealand respectively. The single also appeared on the singles charts of France, United Kingdom and Belgium. On August 29, 2013, a promotional digital remix EP of "What Now" was released exclusively to Beatport. "What Now" officially impacted US rhythmic radio on 24 September 2013, and later impacted on Top 40/Mainstream radio on October 1, 2013. The song's accompanying music video was released to Vevo on November 15, 2013.

== Release and promotion ==
To further promote the announcement for her seventh upcoming studio album, Rihanna launched a promotional website rihanna7.com in September 2012. Via her official Twitter account, she posted series of "teasing" tweets announcing her seventh studio album. On October 11, 2012, she revealed the cover art and title of her new album, Unapologetic. VH1 ranked the cover at number one on their list of The 30 Hottest Naked Album Covers Ever. Regarding the title of the album, Rihanna explained that she named it because she wanted to express how honest she is, "I named my album 'Unapologetic' because there is only one truth, and you can't apologise for that. It's honest. I'm always evolving, of course, I think the only motto I have is to be true to myself."

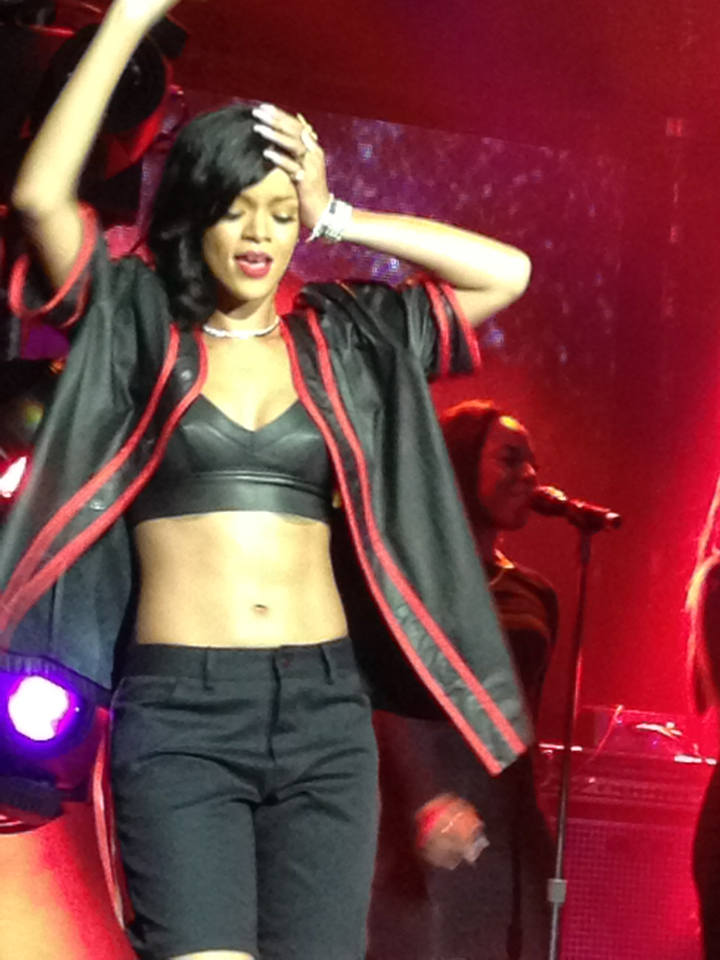
Rihanna performing during her 777 Tour in Mexico

In August 2012, it was revealed that Unapologetic would be released in late November 2012. In early October, it was reported that the album would be released on November 19, 2012. On November 2, 2012, Rihanna released a behind the scenes video of the journey to making Unapologetic. The first video included a behind-the-scenes view of Rihanna backstage at the 2012 MTV Video Music Awards, a shooting range, rehearsing for the iHeartRadio Music Festival and a photoshoot at a studio. On November 14, Rihanna embarked on a seven-date promotional tour for Unapologetic titled the 777 Tour. She performed seven concerts in seven days, each in a different city in North America and Europe. Fans and members of the international press (150 journalists representing 82 countries) were invited aboard a chartered Boeing 777 twinjet to every venue. Beginning on November 14, in Mexico City, the tour visited Toronto (Canada), Stockholm (Sweden), Paris (France), Berlin (Germany), London (UK) and ended on 20 November in New York City (United States). On 6 May 2013, Fox aired a tour documentary, with a documentary DVD being released the following day.

Rihanna performed "Diamonds" and "Phresh Out the Runway" at the 2012 Victoria's Secret Fashion Show on November 7, 2012, which aired on CBS on December 4, 2012. She performed "Diamonds" and a solo version of "Stay" on Saturday Night Live on November 10, 2012. On November 25, 2012, Rihanna performed "Diamonds" on The X Factor in the United Kingdom. On 8 December, she performed the song on Wetten, dass..? in Germany. On December 9, 2012, Rihanna performed "Stay" in a medley with her 2011 single "We Found Love" on the final of series nine of British The X Factor. She also performed "Diamonds" on La Chanson de l'année ("The song of the Year") in France, on December 10, 2012, which was broadcast on December 29, 2012.

During the 55th Annual Grammy Awards on February 10, 2013, Rihanna performed "Could You Be Loved" alongside Bruno Mars, Sting, Damian Marley and Ziggy Marley as a tribute to Bob Marley. Rihanna performed for a second time at the award ceremony, where she performed her album's second single "Stay" along with Mikky Ekko. To further promote the album, Rihanna embarked on her fifth concert tour, the Diamonds World Tour in March 2013. North American, African and European dates were announced with ASAP Rocky serving as the support act for North America, while David Guetta performed for the Moroccan date of the tour as well as some selected European dates including London and Paris. In September 2013, she also performed on Channel 4's Alan Carr: Chatty Man to promote "What Now".

== Critical reception ==
Professional ratings
Aggregate scores
Source	Rating
AnyDecentMusic?	5.4/10
Metacritic	61/100
Review scores
Source	Rating
AllMusic	3.5/5 stars
The A.V. Club	C+
Entertainment Weekly	B+
The Guardian	3/5 stars
The Independent	3/5 stars
NME	7/10
Pitchfork	4.5/10
Rolling Stone	3.5/5 stars
Slant Magazine	3/5 stars
Spin	7/10

Unapologetic received mixed to positive reviews from music critics. At Metacritic, which assigns a normalized rating out of 100 to reviews from mainstream critics, the album holds an average score of 61, which indicates "generally favorable reviews", based on 25 reviews. Alexis Petridis of The Guardian found it "far more interesting" sonically than Talk That Talk and stated, "there's stuff here that's worth hearing, if you could untangle the music from the artist's personal life." Fact magazine's Alex Macpherson felt that it has some of Rihanna's most compelling songs since Rated R (2009) and that, "even when Unapologetic fails, it often does so in interesting ways" musically. AllMusic's Andy Kellman opined that "the only way to enjoy a significant portion of it is by taking it as pure entertainment" and called it "another timely refresh of contemporary pop music".

Dan Martin of NME commented that, "at its best, Unapologetic trades in daring avant pop", and dubbed Rihanna the "most compelling of pop phenomena". Jon Dolan of Rolling Stone asserted that "Unapologetic's stark, shadowy R&B is confrontationally honest and sung within an inch of its life". Jon Caramanica of The New York Times felt that it "makes the most of [Rihanna's] talent" and stated, "even on the most vulnerable songs, she maintains her cool, never once verging on the maudlin". Smokey Fontaine of The Huffington Post called it "kinetic and musically varied", and wrote that it "blasts the sounds of global, post-mod youth culture through every track".

In a mixed review, Genevieve Koski of The A.V. Club criticized Rihanna for "extend[ing] the album's defiant tone to her romantic life" and called it "a fiery pop album that's unfortunately coated in the icky residue of unearned defiance that has marked Brown's recent output." Randall Roberts of the Los Angeles Times felt that its commercial "lyrical turns poison" the album, "even while musically, Rihanna has evolved into one of the more forward-thinking pop divas." Simon Price of The Independent panned Rihanna's singing as "flatter than Norfolk" and its material "dull as dishwater", observing "the usual half-hearted, sexual single-entendres".

Greg Kot of the Chicago Tribune wrote, "in the context of an album dominated by ballads and at least superficially introspective lyrics", the dubstep songs "feel like respites". Slant Magazine's Eric Henderson commented that the album sounds "cobbled together" and quipped, "If only the music were compelling enough to back up the supreme bad faith" of the lyrics. Pitchfork's Jessica Hopper dismissed its music as "synth-pop slog" and said that the songs "make for dull labor, not worth our time and not befitting Rihanna's talent". In his consumer guide for MSN Music, Robert Christgau facetiously called her "so much more provocative as an android than as a human being". He cited "Phresh Out the Runway", "Diamonds", and "Numb" as highlights, and gave the album a three-star honorable mention, which indicates "an enjoyable effort consumers attuned to its overriding aesthetic or individual vision may well treasure".

=== Accolades ===
Unapologetic received the award for Top R&B Album at the Billboard Music Awards of 2013. At the 2013 American Music Awards it was nominated for Favorite Soul/R&B Album, however, it lost to The 20/20 Experience by Justin Timberlake. At the 56th Annual Grammy Awards, held on 26 January 2014, Unapologetic won the Grammy Award for Best Urban Contemporary Album.

=== Usage in Super Bowl LVII Halftime Show performance ===
At the Super Bowl LVII Halftime Show held in Glendale, Arizona on February 12, 2023, the setlist included four songs from the album, with Rihanna performing "Pour It Up" and "Diamonds" live; and with elements of "Phresh Out The Runway" and "Numb" being included in other songs. Following the performance, the album rose from No. 197 on the Billboard 200 to No. 18.

== Commercial performance ==
In the United States, Unapologetic debuted at number one on the Billboard 200 and sold 238,000 copies in its first week. It was Rihanna's first number-one album in the US and the best-selling debut week of her career. In the same week, the album's lead single "Diamonds" remained atop the Billboard Hot 100 for a second consecutive week. Consequently, Rihanna became the second artist of 2012 to top both the Billboard 200 and Hot 100 simultaneously. The following week, the album fell to number six and sold 72,000 copies. On the issue dated 11 March 2013 (its fourteenth week on the chart), the album re-entered the Billboard 200 top five at number five, selling 28,000 that week. On 30 May, in its 27th consecutive week on the Billboard 200, Unapologetic passed the one million sales mark, selling at a faster rate than her previous album, Talk That Talk. With the feat, the album became her sixth album to sell at least one million copies. On July 3, 2013, Billboard mid-year sales reported that Unapologetic is the 16th best-selling album of 2013 thus far, selling 494,000 copies from January 1 to June 30, 2013. As of June 2015, Unapologetic has sold 1.2 million copies in the US. In February 2018 the album was certified 3× Platinum by the Recording Industry Association of America (RIAA), denoting shipments of over 3 million album-equivalent units in the US.

In the United Kingdom, the album debuted at number one on the UK Albums Chart, with sales of more than 99,000 copies in its first week. With the debut, it became Rihanna's fourth album to reach the top spot in the UK and also her third consecutive chart topper, tying Madonna, Eva Cassidy and Norah Jones for the female artists with most consecutive UK number one albums. By May 2013, the album had sold 635,000 copies in the UK. It also reached number one in Switzerland and Norway, number two in Belgium (Flanders), number 3 in France, Croatia, Germany and Russia, number 6 in the Netherlands and Spain, number 7 in South Africa and Denmark, where the album was certified gold by the IFPI Denmark, denoting shipments of 10,000 copies., number 8 in South Korea and number 10 in Italy and Greece. According to the International Federation of the Phonographic Industry (IFPI), the album had sold over 2.3 million copies worldwide by February 2013, making it the eight best selling album of 2012. In France, Unapologetic has sold 240,000 copies as of May 2013. As of March 2015, Unapologetic has sold over four million copies worldwide.

Unapologetic was ranked as the tenth most popular album of 2013 on the Billboard 200.

== Track listing ==
Standard edition
No.	Title	Writer(s)	Producer(s)	Length
1.	"Phresh Out the Runway"	David Guetta; Giorgio Tuinfort; Terius Nash; Robyn Fenty		3:42
2.	"Diamonds"	Sia Furler; Benjamin Levin; Mikkel S. Eriksen; Tor Erik Hermansen	Stargate; Benny Blanco	3:45
3.	"Numb" (featuring Eminem)	Sam Dew; Warren "Oak" Felder; Andrew "Pop" Wansel; Ronald "Flip" Colson; Marshall Mathers; Connie Mitchell; Kanye West; Aldrin Davis; Fenty	@Oakwud; @Flippa123; @PopWansel	3:25
4.	"Pour It Up"	Michael Williams; Theron Thomas; Timothy Thomas; Fenty	Mike Will Made It; J-Bo (co.)	2:41
5.	"Loveeeeeee Song" (featuring Future)	Nayvadius Wilburn; Denisea "Blu June" Andrews; Fenty	Luney Tunez; Mex Manny; Future	4:16
6.	"Jump"	Kevin Cossom; M. B. Williams; Eriksen; Hermansen; Saul Milton; Will Kennard; Elgin "Ginuwine" Lumpkin; Stephen Garrett; Timothy "Timbaland" Mosley	Stargate; Chase & Status	4:24
7.	"Right Now" (featuring David Guetta)	Nash; Guetta; Eriksen; Hermansen; Shaffer Chimere Smith; Tuinfort; Nick Rotteveel; Ester Dean; Fenty	Guetta; Stargate; Nicky Romero; Tuinfort	3:01
8.	"What Now"	Olivia Waithe; Parker Ighile; Nathan Cassells; Fenty	Ighile; Cassells (co.)	4:03
9.	"Stay" (featuring Mikky Ekko)	Mikky Ekko; Justin Parker; Elof Loel	Ekko; Loelv; Parker	4:00
10.	"Nobody's Business" (featuring Chris Brown)	Nash; Carlos "Los" McKinney; Michael Jackson; Fenty	Nash; Carlos "Los" McKinney	3:36
11.	"Love Without Tragedy / Mother Mary"	Nash; McKinney; Fenty	Nash; McKinney	6:58
12.	"Get It Over With"	James Fauntleroy; Brian Seals; Fenty	Brian Kennedy	3:31
13.	"No Love Allowed"	Sean "Elijah Blake" Fenton; Alexander Izquierdo; Ernest Wilson; Steve Wyreman; Fenty	No ID	4:09
14.	"Lost in Paradise"	Dean; Timothy McKenzie; Eriksen; Hermansen; Fenty	Stargate; Labrinth	3:35
Total length:				55:06

Deluxe edition
No.	Title	Writer(s)	Producer(s)	Length
15.	"Half of Me"	Emeli Sandé; Shahid Khan; Eriksen; Hermansen	Stargate; Naughty Boy	3:12
16.	"Diamonds" (Dave Audé 100 Extended Mix)	Furler; Levin; Eriksen; Hermansen	Stargate; Benny Blanco; Audé (add.); Kemal Golden (add.)	5:03
17.	"Diamonds" (Gregor Salto Downtempo Remix)	Furler; Levin; Eriksen; Hermansen	Stargate; Benny Blanco; Salto (add.); Tzvetin Todorov (add.)	4:29
Total length:				67:50

=== Notes ===
- Credits adapted from Apple Music and Tidal.
- Deluxe edition and diamonds deluxe edition box include a 20 minute DVD that features never before released footage and a first look at Loud Tour Live at the O2.
- Diamonds executive platinum box includes additionally a bonus vinyl which features the Gregor Salto Downtempo Remix, The Bimbo Jones Downtempo, Dave Audé 100 Extended Mix, Steven Redant Festival Mix and the Bimbo Jones Vocal Remix of "Diamonds".
- River Island exclusive edition includes the Congorock Remix of "Diamonds".

=== Sample credits ===
- "Numb" incorporates lyrics from "Can't Tell Me Nothing" (2007) performed by Kanye West, written by Kanye West and Aldrin Davis.
- "Jump" samples elements of "Pony" (1996) performed by Ginuwine, written by Elgin "Ginuwine" Lumpkin, Stephen Garrett and Timothy "Timbaland" Mosley.
- "Nobody's Business" incorporates lyrics from "The Way You Make Me Feel" (1987) written and performed by Michael Jackson.

== Personnel ==
Credits are adapted from AllMusic and album's liner notes.

- Rihanna – lead vocals, creative director, executive producer
- Dave Audé – remix, additional production, and mixdown (track 16)
- Alejandro Barajas – music engineer (track 4)
- Benny Blanco – producer (tracks 2, 16, 17), instrumentation and programming (tracks 2, 7)
- Tanisha Broadwater – production coordination (track 3)
- Chris Brown – vocals (track 10)
- Josh Campbell – engineer (track 1)
- Nathan Cassells – co-producer, engineer, instrumentation, and programming (track 8)
- Chase – producer, instrumentation, and programming (track 6)
- Robert Cohen – assistant engineer (tracks 2, 3, 5, 8–12, 14)
- Ronald "Flip" Colson – producer (track 3)
- Sam Dew – background vocals (track 3)
- Christian Dwiggins – mixdown (track 16)
- Mikky Ekko – vocals, producer, arrangements, and additional production/landscape (track 9)
- Eminem – rap (track 3)
- Mikkel S. Eriksen – producer (tracks 2, 6, 7, 14–17), instrumentation and programming (tracks 2, 6, 7), engineer (tracks 2, 6, 16, 17)
- Warren "Oak" Felder – producer (track 3)
- Seth Firkins – music engineer and vocal engineer for Future (track 5)
- Melissa T. Forde – photography
- Future – vocals, producer, instrumentation, and programming (track 5)
- Mike Gaydusek – vocal engineer (track 9)
- Kevin Cossom;– additional vocals, writer (track 6)
- Chris Gehringer – mastering
- Kemal Golden – remix and additional production (track 16)
- David Guetta – producer, instrumentation, and programming (tracks 1, 7)
- Kuk Harrell – vocal engineer (tracks 1–9, 11–17), vocal producer (tracks 1–3, 5–17)
- Tor Erik Hermansen – producer (tracks 2, 6, 7, 14–17), instrumentation and programming (tracks 2, 6, 7)
- Tom Hough – assistant engineer (track 1)
- Mario Hugo – illustrations
- Parker Ighile – producer, music engineer, instrumentation, and programming (track 8)
- J-Bo – co-producer, instrumentation, and programming (track 4)
- Jayson Joshua – mixing (track 11)
- Brian Kennedy – producer, instrumentation, and programming (track 12)
- Kimmie Keyes – make-up
- Rob Kinelski – additional engineering (track 13)
- Labrinth – producer (track 14)
- Elof Loelv – producer and additional production/landscape (track 9)
- Andrew "Muffman" Luftman – assistant engineer (tracks 2, 16, 17)
- Deborah Mannis-Gardner – sample clearance
- Blake Mares – assistant engineer (tracks 2, 3, 8–14)
- Manny Marroquin – mixing (tracks 3–5, 10, 13)
- Carlos "Los" McKinney – producer (tracks 10, 11)
- Donnie Meadows – production coordination (track 3)
- MJ – additional drum programming (track 1)
- Mylah Morales – make-up
- Michael Muller – photography
- Terius "The-Dream" Nash – producer (tracks 1, 10, 11), instrumentation & programming (track 1)
- No I.D. – producer (track 13)
- Liam Nolan – assistant engineer (tracks 3, 13)
- Paul Norris – engineer (track 7), assistant engineer (tracks 8, 12, 13)
- Mel Ottenberg – stylist
- Ciarra Pardo – art direction, creative director
- Justin Parker – producer, arrangements, and piano (track 9)
- Joel Peters – assistant engineer (track 1)
- James Poyser – keyboards (track 13)
- Will Quinnell – mastering assistant
- Ben Rhodes – assistant engineer (track 1)
- Daniela Rivera – additional assistant engineer (tracks 2, 6–8, 16, 17)
- Evan Rogers – executive producer
- Nicky Romero – producer, mixing, instrumentation, and programming (track 7)
- Gregor Salto – remix and additional production (track 17)
- Donnie Scantz – music engineer (track 13)
- Bart Schoudel – music engineer (tracks 10, 11), additional engineering (track 1)
- Status – producer, instrumentation, and programming (track 6)
- Ursula Stephens – hairstylist
- Xavier Stephenson – additional engineering (track 3), assistant engineer (track 7)
- Carl Sturken – executive producer
- Phil Tan – mixing (tracks 2, 6, 8, 9, 14–17), vocal mixing (track 7)
- Tzvestin Todorov – remix and additional production (track 17)
- Marcos Tovar – vocal engineer (tracks 1–9, 11–17), additional engineering (tracks 8, 13), music engineer (track 12)
- Giorgio Tuinfort – producer, instrumentation, and programming (tracks 1, 7)
- Anna Ugarte – assistant engineer (track 13)
- Miles Walker – engineer (tracks 2, 6, 16, 17)
- Andrew "Pop" Wansel – producer (track 3)
- Mike Will – producer, instrumentation, programming, and additional vocals (track 4)
- Steve Wyreman – guitar and bass (track 13)
- Aamir Yaqub – assistant engineer (tracks 3, 6), engineer (track 7)

== Charts ==
=== Weekly charts ===
Weekly chart performance for Unapologetic
Chart (2012–13)	Peak position
Australian Albums (ARIA)	8
Australian Urban Albums (ARIA)	1
Austrian Albums (Ö3 Austria)	5
Belgian Albums (Ultratop Flanders)	2
Belgian Albums (Ultratop Wallonia)	5
Canadian Albums (Billboard)	1
Croatian International Albums (HDU)	4
Czech Republic Albums (IFPI)	12
Danish Albums (Hitlisten)	7
Dutch Albums (Album Top 100)	6
Finnish Albums (Suomen virallinen lista)	12
French Albums (SNEP)	3
German Albums (Offizielle Top 100)	3
Greek Albums (IFPI Greece)	8
Hungarian Albums (MAHASZ)	15
Irish Albums (IRMA)	1
Italian Albums (FIMI)	7
Japanese Albums (Oricon)	11
Mexican Albums (Top 100 Mexico)	16
New Zealand Albums (RMNZ)	5
Norwegian Albums (VG-lista)	1
Polish Albums (OLiS)	4
Portuguese Albums (AFP)	11
Russian Albums (2M)	9
Scottish Albums (Official Charts)	3
South African Albums (RISA)	5
South Korean Albums (Circle)	39
South Korean Foreign Albums (Circle)	5
Spanish Albums (Promusicae)	9
Swedish Albums (Sverigetopplistan)	15
Swiss Albums (Schweizer Hitparade)	1
Taiwan International Albums (G-Music)	3
UK Albums (Official Charts)	1
UK R&B Albums (Official Charts)	1
US Billboard 200	1
US Top R&B/Hip-Hop Albums (Billboard)	1

=== Year-end charts ===
Year-end chart performance for Unapologetic
Chart (2012)	Position
Australian Albums (ARIA)	68
Australian Hip-Hop/R&B Albums (ARIA)	7
Austrian Albums (Ö3 Austria)	73
Belgian Albums (Ultratop Flanders)	55
Belgian Albums (Ultratop Wallonia)	61
Danish Albums (Hitlisten)	43
Dutch Albums (Album Top 100)	56
French Albums (SNEP)	19
German Albums (Offizielle Top 100)	33
Irish Albums (IRMA)	10
Italian Albums (FIMI)	63
Polish Albums (ZPAV)	10
Swiss Albums (Schweizer Hitparade)	31
UK Albums (Official Charts)	10
Worldwide (IFPI)	9

Chart (2013)	Position
Argentine Yearly Albums (CAPIF)	99
Australian Albums (ARIA)	52
Australian Hip-Hop/R&B Albums (ARIA)	5
Belgian Albums (Ultratop Flanders)	30
Belgian Albums (Ultratop Wallonia)	51
Canadian Albums (Billboard)	7
Danish Albums (Hitlisten)	54
Dutch Albums (Album Top 100)	29
French Albums (SNEP)	31
Germany Albums (Offizielle Top 100)	81
Italian Albums (FIMI)	84
New Zealand Albums (RMNZ)	36
Spanish Albums (PROMUSICAE)	43
Swedish Albums (Sverigetopplistan)	63
Swiss Albums (Schweizer Hitparade)	17
UK Albums (Official Charts)	39
US Billboard 200	10
US Digital Albums (Billboard)	22
US Top R&B/Hip-Hop Albums (Billboard)	2

Chart (2014)	Position
Australian Hip-Hop/R&B Albums (ARIA)	50

Chart (2016)	Position
Danish Albums (Hitlisten)	91

Chart (2023)	Position
Dutch Albums (Album Top 100)	74

Chart (2024)	Position
Belgian Albums (Ultratop Flanders)	197
Dutch Albums (Album Top 100)	96

Chart (2025)	Position
Dutch Albums (Album Top 100)	97

=== Decade-end charts ===
2010s-end chart performance for Unapologetic
Chart (2010–2019)	Position
UK Albums (Official Charts)	80
US Billboard 200	106

== Certifications and sales ==
Certifications and sales for Unapologetic
Region	Certification	Certified units/sales
Australia (ARIA)	2× Platinum	140,000^{‡}
Austria (IFPI Austria)	Platinum	20,000^{*}
Belgium (BRMA)	Gold	15,000^{*}
Brazil (Pro-Música Brasil)	Gold	30,000^{*}
Canada (Music Canada)	Platinum	80,000^{^}
Colombia	Gold	
Denmark (IFPI Danmark)	3× Platinum	60,000^{‡}
France	—	240,000
Germany (BVMI)	3× Gold	300,000^{‡}
Hungary (MAHASZ)	Gold	3,000^{^}
Ireland (IRMA)	2× Platinum	30,000^{^}
Italy (FIMI)	Platinum	50,000^{‡}
Mexico (AMPROFON)	Gold	30,000^{^}
New Zealand (RMNZ)	5× Platinum	75,000^{‡}
Poland (ZPAV)	3× Platinum	60,000^{*}
Portugal (AFP)	Gold	7,500^{^}
Singapore (RIAS)	Platinum	10,000^{*}
Spain (Promusicae)	Gold	20,000^{^}
Sweden (GLF)	Platinum	40,000^{‡}
United Kingdom (BPI)	3× Platinum	900,000^{‡}
United States (RIAA)	3× Platinum	3,000,000^{‡}
Summaries
Worldwide	—	4,000,000
^{*} Sales figures based on certification alone.^{^} Shipments figures based on certification alone.^{‡} Sales+streaming figures based on certification alone.

== Release history ==
Release dates for Unapologetic
Region	Date	Format	Label	Edition
Australia	November 19, 2012	CD / CD+DVD	Universal Music	Standard / Deluxe edition
France	November 19, 2012	CD / CD+DVD	Universal Music	Standard / Deluxe edition
Morocco	November 19, 2012	CD / CD+DVD	Universal Music	Standard / Deluxe edition
Germany	November 19, 2012	CD / CD+DVD	Universal Music	Standard / Deluxe edition
United Kingdom	November 19, 2012	CD / CD+DVD	Def Jam Recordings	Standard / Deluxe edition
United States	November 19, 2012	CD / CD+DVD	Def Jam Recordings	Standard / Deluxe edition
Italy	November 20, 2012	CD / CD+DVD	Universal Music	Standard / Deluxe edition
Netherlands	November 20, 2012	CD / CD+DVD	Universal Music	Standard / Deluxe edition
Poland	November 20, 2012	CD / CD+DVD	Universal Music	Standard / Deluxe edition
Sweden	November 21, 2012	CD / CD+DVD	Universal Music	Standard / Deluxe edition
Indonesia	December 17, 2012	CD	Universal Music	Standard edition

== See also ==
- List of UK Albums Chart number ones of the 2010s
- List of number-one albums of 2012 (Canada)
- List of number-one albums of 2012 (U.S.)
- List of number-one R&B albums of 2012 (U.S.)
- List of UK R&B Chart number-one albums of 2012
- List of UK R&B Chart number-one albums of 2013
