= Diamonds (Rihanna song) =

2012 single by Rihanna

Single by Rihanna

from the album Unapologetic
- Released: September 26, 2012
- Studio: Roc the Mic (New York City); Westlake Recording (Los Angeles)
- Genre: Pop; electronic; R&B
- Length: 3:45
- Label: Def Jam; SRP
- Songwriters: Sia Furler; Benjamin Levin; Mikkel S. Eriksen; Tor Erik Hermansen
- Producers: Benny Blanco; Stargate

Rihanna singles chronology
"Cockiness (Love It)" (remix) (2012)	"Diamonds" (2012)	"Stay" (2012)

Kanye West singles chronology
"Clique" (2012)	"Diamonds" (remix) (2012)	"Black Skinhead" (2013)

Music video
- "Diamonds" on YouTube

"Diamonds" is a song recorded by the Barbadian singer Rihanna as the lead single for her seventh album, Unapologetic (2012). Sia wrote the track with the song's producers, Benny Blanco and Stargate. The song premiered on September 26, 2012, during the Elvis Duran and the Morning Show and was digitally released the following day as the lead single from Unapologetic. "Diamonds" is a mid-tempo pop, electronic and R&B ballad that features heavy synthesizers, orchestral sounds and electronic rhythms. The song's lyrics serve as a departure from the themes of unhealthy relationships that were on Rihanna's previous singles contrasted to the song's portrayal of lovers as "diamonds in the sky". Music critics complimented the song's emotional depth and maturity, while also praising the lyrics and Rihanna's vocal performance, though others felt that it lacked the depth and punch when compared to her previous hits.

"Diamonds" topped music charts in over 20 countries, including the United States, where it became Rihanna's twelfth number 1 single on the Billboard Hot 100 and tied her with Madonna and the Supremes for the fifth-most number 1 singles in the chart's history. "Diamonds" was certified Diamond by the Recording Industry Association of America (RIAA) and sold over 3.5 million digital copies in the country. It was also certified Diamond in Poland. It also peaked at number 1 on the UK Singles Chart and became Rihanna's seventh number 1 song in the country; it was certified quadruple-times Platinum by the British Phonographic Industry (BPI). By May 2013, it had sold over 7.5 million copies worldwide.

The song's music video was shot by director Anthony Mandler, a frequent collaborator of Rihanna's, and depicts her in four environments that represent the elements of earth, air, water, and fire. The video received positive reviews and was praised for its imagery. Some critics believe that the heavily tattooed man intertwined with Rihanna's arm in the video resembles Chris Brown. The singer performed "Diamonds" on television shows such as Saturday Night Live and The X Factor and included it on the 777, Diamonds, Monster Tour and the Anti World Tour set lists. The American Society of Composers, Authors and Publishers (ASCAP) recognized it as one of the most performed songs of 2013 and 2014. The official remix of "Diamonds" featured rapper Kanye West and was released on November 16, 2012. The song has been covered by various recording artists, including Josef Salvat, who released his own cover of "Diamonds" as a single.It has currently surpassed 2 billion streams on Spotify.

== Writing and production ==
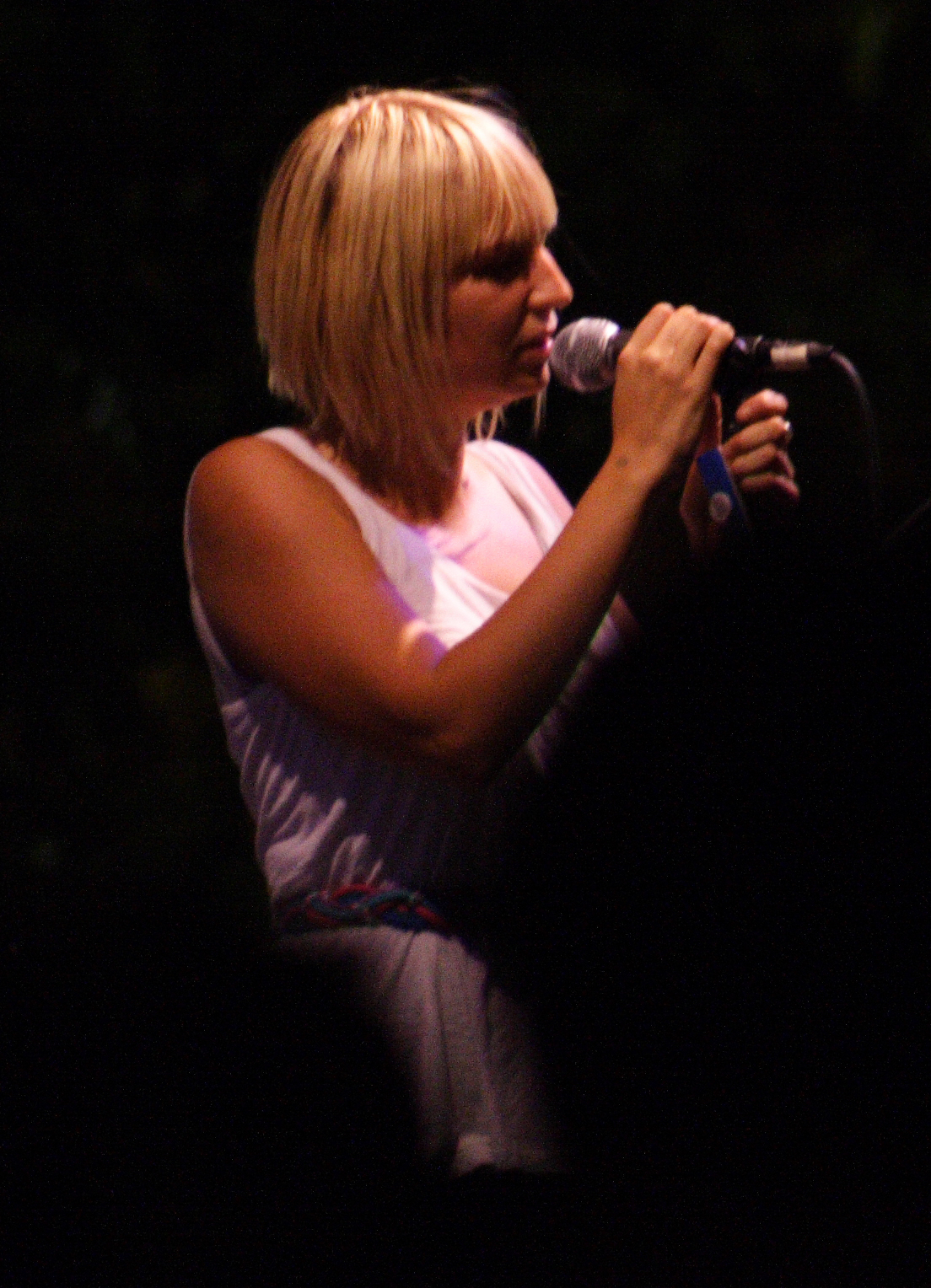
Sia (pictured) wrote the lyrics, while producer Benny Blanco co-wrote and co-produced "Diamonds" with Stargate.

In 2012, American songwriter and record producer Benny Blanco met with Norwegian production duo Stargate at a recording studio in New York City to write new songs, including one for Rihanna. Stargate had previously produced her singles "Don't Stop the Music" (2007) and "Only Girl (In the World)" (2010). According to Blanco, he and Stargate wanted to deviate from Rihanna's usual sound and produce as though the song would be for a rapper such as Kanye West: "It's the one that we weren't thinking Rihanna ... that turned into the Rihanna record ... But that's how it always happens... with me". They produced the song's drum machine beat after the other instrumental music was recorded.

Stargate's Mikkel Eriksen told The New York Times that Blanco took a recorded snippet of Eriksen's singing, altered it electronically, and made it sound "dirtier". He then applied timbre and used audio software to create ghostly accompaniment lines. Eriksen described Blanco's style as "unorthodox, as he almost never plays the keyboards but throws in weird samples and alters them to the right pitch to go with the song." Australian singer-songwriter Sia later joined them and wrote the lyrics for "Diamonds" in 14 minutes.

After the song was completed, they wanted to play it to Rihanna, but Blanco was skeptical about the reaction towards the song because of its slow sound. After Stargate played it to her, they called Blanco from London and told him that she liked the song: "She's flippin' out. She played it like seven times in a row. It's her favorite song." Phil Tan and the assistant Daniela Rivera, mixed and mastered "Diamonds". Rihanna attempted to emulate Sia's singing style, which reportedly led to Sia thinking that her own vocal recording had been released. Recalling it, in an interview with The Huffington Post, Blanco commented, "We needed to have it recorded, the beat finished, mixed and mastered in 24 hours. She was recording in a separate part of the world, sending back the files, we're finishing the music and then we're mixing and mastering it, and then it was out in a few days. It's fucking amazing and incredible." Kuk Harrell produced Rihanna's vocals on the song and recorded them together with Marcos Tovar.

In 2021, Blanco said that Rihanna was not who he had in mind for the track initially. He considered Kanye West or Lana Del Rey but Stargate was adamant it should be Rihanna. He also revealed that Eminem recorded a song on the beat.

== Release and artwork ==
"I think a lot of people are afraid of being happy because of what others might think of it. ... They're afraid to embrace that and embrace themselves and love themselves and do what they love and do what makes them happy."

— Rihanna talking about the lyrical meaning behind "Diamonds" for MTV News.

On September 12, 2012, Def Jam France announced via Twitter that Rihanna would release a new single the following week and that her seventh studio album would be released in November. However, the tweet was shortly deleted and replaced with another clarifying that more information would be given on September 13. In an interview with iHeartRadio at their annual music festival in September, Rihanna confirmed "Diamonds" as her new single and said that it would first be played on American radio, beginning on September 26. She described it as an easy-going, but optimistic song that is "happy and hippy" rather than dance-oriented and said that the song "gives me such a great feeling when I listen to it. The lyrics are very hopeful and positive, but it's about love."

The single's cover artwork was revealed on September 24 and depicted Rihanna rolling diamonds in a manner suggestive of joint rolling. On September 26, Rihanna posted the full lyrics of the song in a PDF on her official website Rihanna7.com. "Diamonds" premiered the same day on the Elvis Duran and the Morning Show, and on the following day, it was released as a digital download on the 7 Digital store. In the United Kingdom, the song was released to 7 Digital on September 28. Def Jam Recordings solicited the single to mainstream and rhythmic contemporary radio formats in the United States on October 2. On November 5, it was released in Germany as a CD single, which also contained the song's Bimbo Jones vocal remix. On December 18, eight digital remixes of the single were digitally released.

== Composition and lyrical interpretation ==
"Diamonds"
A 21-second sample of the chorus of "Diamonds", which has been characterized by critics as a mid-tempo pop, electronic and R&B song. It features drums, heavy synthesizers, orchestral sounds, and electronic rhythms.

"Diamonds" has a length of three minutes and forty-five seconds. The lyrics are composed in two main stanzas with the repetition of the chorus sung six times in the song using variations of the main verse depicting "diamonds in the sky". Allmusic critic Andy Kellman characterized it as a mid-tempo pop ballad, while Michael Baggs of Gigwise described it as a mid-tempo electronic song. Time Out's James Manning described the song as a "somber" R&B ballad. It features heavy synthesizers, orchestral sounds and electronic rhythms accompanying Rihanna's vocal performance. Rolling Stone magazine wrote that "the track's production mainly stays out of Rihanna's way, letting the pop star build hooks with layers of her voice." In a review of Unapologetic, Stacy-Ann Ellis of Vibe noted that an improvement in the singer's singing is evidenced by ballads such as "Diamonds" and "Stay". According to EMI Music Publishing's digital sheet music for the song, "Diamonds" is composed in the key of B minor and set in common time signature, and has a moderately slow groove of 92 beats per minute. Rihanna's vocals span from the low note of F♯_{3} to the high note of F♯_{5}.

== Critical reception ==
In a positive review of the song, Robert Copsey of Digital Spy gave it four out of five stars and praised Rihanna's direction towards a "softer and more prolific edge". Brittany Lewis of GlobalGrind called "Diamonds" a catchy song and felt that it had the potential to be another hit for Rihanna. Glenn Gamboa of Newsday said that, although it does not sound like an emphatic hit, the lyrical content of the song depicts a "personal shift" for Rihanna. According to James Montgomery of MTV News, "Diamonds" is more positive than previous singles such as "We Found Love" and "Where Have You Been", despite its moderate tempo. Lindsey DiMattina of Hollywood.com said that Rihanna's singing is stronger than ever. Contactmusic's reviewer described it as a "laid-back track", and suggested that the lyrical content is related to her former boyfriend Chris Brown. In a track-by-track review of Unapologetic, Andrew Hampp of Billboard found the song inspiring and commented that it "finds Rihanna doing one of her throatiest, most impassioned vocals to date". Andy Kellman of Allmusic cited the song as one of the highlights on Unapologetic, and gave it three and a half stars.

In a less enthusiastic critique, Jon Caramanica of The New York Times likened "Diamonds" to a James Bond movie theme song, but with "insipid lyrics". Jim Farber of the New York Daily News felt that the song is not as evocative as it attempts to be and lacks the sense of mystery and engaging production found on "We Found Love". Kevin Blair of the Irish Independent's, Independent Woman, was critical of the song and dismissed it as a "chugging, faintly misty-eyed, middle of the road pop song". Chris Richards of The Washington Post panned the song as a "power ballad without much power".

=== Recognition and accolades ===
Ernest Baker and Lauren Nostro of Complex ranked "Diamonds" atop their list of The 10 Best Guilty Pleasure Songs of 2012 and wrote that, although the song is unlike Rihanna's louder, more anthemic songs, "apparently the world loves to see a softer side of her, too." Black Entertainment Television placed the single at number 6 on their 50 Best Songs of 2012 list and called it one of Rihanna's most emotive performances. UK E! Online's reviewer named it the fifth best song of the year and said that Rihanna's vocal performance on the song validates the attention she had received since her breakthrough with "Umbrella". Irish Independent's Jim Hayes ranked it as the year's tenth-best song and described it as "a laid back slow burner that invades and refuses to leave". A reviewer from The Huffington Post named "Diamonds" one of The 12 Best Songs by Women in 2012.

At the ASCAP Pop Music Awards, the American Society of Composers, Authors and Publishers (ASCAP) recognized it as one of the most performed songs of 2013 and 2014 respectively. "Diamonds" received the Billboard accolade for Top R&B Song at the 2013 award ceremony held at the MGM Grand Garden Arena in Las Vegas. At the 2013 BET Awards, the song was nominated for the Coca-Cola Viewer's Choice accolade, however, it lost to "Started from the Bottom" by Drake. It also received nominations for Best International Song at the NRJ Music Awards of 2013 in France and for Hit of the Year at the 2013 Echo Awards in Germany. "Diamonds" received a nomination for Best Song at the 2013 MTV Europe Music Awards.

== Commercial performance ==
=== North America ===
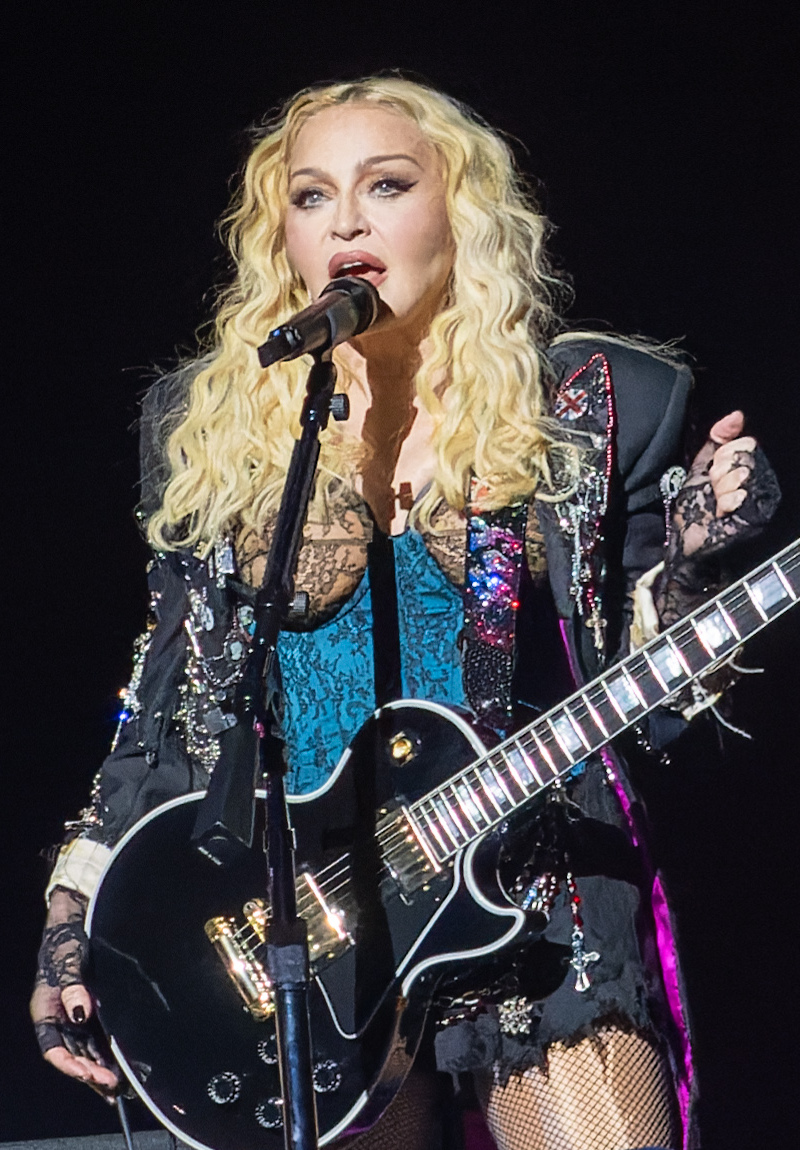
"Diamonds" became Rihanna's twelfth number 1 on the US Billboard Hot 100, tying her with Madonna (pictured) and the Supremes as the artists with the fifth-most number 1 singles in the chart's history.

In the US, "Diamonds" debuted at number 16 on the Billboard Hot 100 and sold 133,000 copies in its first week. In its fourth week, it climbed to number 8 on the chart and became Rihanna's twenty-third top-ten single. For the week ending December 1, 2012, the song became Rihanna's twelfth number 1 on the chart, which ended the nine-week reign of Maroon 5's "One More Night". With the feat, Rihanna tied Madonna and the Supremes as the artists with the fifth-most number 1 singles in the chart's history. Rihanna also passed Mariah Carey as the female artist to mark twelve number 1 songs the fastest on the chart by achieving the feat in six years and seven months, which bested Carey's stretch of more than seven years. "Diamonds" charted for three consecutive weeks atop the Hot 100, while her album Unapologetic topped the Billboard 200. As a result, Rihanna became only the second artist of 2012 to top both the Billboard singles and albums charts simultaneously; the first to do so was English singer Adele.

On the Radio Songs chart, "Diamonds" debuted at number 28. In its fourth week, it climbed to number 10, becoming Rihanna's 19th top ten, breaking a tie with Lil Wayne for the second-best sum in the list's 22-year history; only Mariah Carey (23) has more. For the issue dated December 15, the song topped the chart, becoming Rihanna's tenth number 1 and placing second for female artists with the most chart toppers, only behind Mariah Carey (11). On the Mainstream Top 40 chart, "Diamonds" debuted at number 29, extending Rihanna's lead as the artist with the most appearances on the chart. On October 11, 2012, Billboard unveiled new methodology for the Hot R&B/Hip-Hop Songs chart, newly factoring digital download sales and streaming data into the 50-position rankings, along with existing radio airplay data monitored by Nielsen BDS. Due to this, "Diamonds" saw a huge leap from number 66 to number 1, marking Rihanna's second single as a lead artist to top the chart; it topped the chart for fourteen consecutive weeks. "Diamonds" topped the Dance Club Songs chart, becoming Rihanna's nineteenth number 1, tying her with Janet Jackson for the second-most number 1 songs in the chart's 36-year history. Only Madonna has more (49). "Diamonds" is, since 2024, certified diamond by the Recording Industry Association of America (RIAA).

In Canada, the song debuted at number 9 on the Canadian Hot 100 for the issue dated October 13, 2012. The song peaked at number 1 on the issue dated November 24, 2012, becoming Rihanna's sixth single to reach number 1 on the chart. It remained atop of it for four consecutive weeks. It was certified Gold by Music Canada denoting sales of over 40,000 copies.

=== Europe and Oceania ===
"Diamonds" made its first chart appearance in Ireland on September 27, 2012, where it debuted at number 17. It reached its peak of number 2 on October 25, 2012. The single debuted at number 1 on both the United Kingdom's pop and R&B singles charts on October 7, 2012, with over 105,000 copies sold. This gave Rihanna her seventh number 1 single in the country. After nine weeks on the pop chart, "Diamonds" rose from number 10 to 3, following Rihanna's performance of the song on The X Factor the previous week. From its debut, the song remained atop the R&B chart for three consecutive weeks before being deposed of the top spot by Labrinth and Emeli Sandé's "Beneath Your Beautiful". As of March 2014, "Diamonds" has sold over one million copies in the UK, and became Rihanna's fourth single to achieve that feat. With that, she became only the second artist to have four million-selling singles in the UK, only behind the Beatles, who have six.

"Diamonds" debuted at number 1 in France, becoming Rihanna's fourth number 1 single in the country and remaining at the top spot for three consecutive weeks. "Diamonds" also peaked at number 1 in Germany for ten consecutive weeks, becoming Rihanna's fifth number 1 single in the country and surpassing "Umbrella" (2007) as her longest-running German number 1 single. The song was placed at number 7 on the German 2012 Year-End singles chart and was certified Platinum, denoting sales of 300,000 copies in the country. "Diamonds" remained number 1 in Norway for eleven consecutive weeks, the Czech Republic for eight, Denmark for six, Switzerland for five, Austria for four, Finland for three weeks and Scotland one.

"Diamonds" entered the New Zealand Singles Chart at number 5 on October 8, 2012. After eight weeks in the top ten, the song peaked at number 2. The single has received a double-Platinum certification from the Recording Industry Association of New Zealand, denoting sales of 30,000 copies. "Diamonds" debuted at number 8 on the Australian Singles Chart on October 14, 2012. The song reached a peak of number 6 on November 4, 2012. The song has been certified 13× Platinum by the Australian Recording Industry Association (ARIA), denoting 910,000 equivalent units. By May 2013, it had sold over 7.5 million copies worldwide.

== Music video ==
=== Background and concept ===
"With every song it's a different story, so the visuals are very specific to that story and that world. With 'Diamonds,' it was just a series of vignettes that we put together to help get the emotion across throughout the song 'cause the song changes and it builds, and there's no real way that you could do that."

— Rihanna explaining the concept for the music video.

Rihanna began to film the music video for "Diamonds" on October 21, 2012, at the Mojave Desert in Lancaster, California. It was directed by her regular collaborator Anthony Mandler, who previously directed her videos for "Russian Roulette" (2009) and "Man Down" (2011). Photographs of the production leaked to the press the same day and showed Rihanna in a white and black dress in front of a fire. Ethan Sacks of the New York Daily News remarked that she "looked like a gem on the set of her video shoot." Rihanna said that she wanted the video's abstract scenes to capture the appropriate emotion for the audience. Mandler sought to create a "wider landscape" by suggesting and transfiguring ideas for viewers through the video: "[T]hey needed to feel like dream vignettes, like, when you wake up from a dream, you realize what you were dreaming about is not really what it was about, it was about something else." He also tried to relate the video's concept to Rihanna's personal life: "What's truth or fiction? You know 'Is she drowning, or is she in complete ecstasy? Are those hands coming apart, or are they finding each other?' ... we tried to bring up these deeper questions that relate to the song and her life and finding beauty in chaos and finding beauty in pain and finding pain in beauty." On November 7, a behind-the-scenes video was posted on MTV's official website. It featured Rihanna in a "leopard-print" robe as she emerged from a trailer and headed to the shooting set. The scenes were intercut with police officers who chase armed fighters. Rihanna stands in a deserted landscape in the video's other scenes. The music video for "Diamonds" premiered November 8 on MTV. The video was also made available for streaming at Rihanna.MTV.com. It was digitally released on November 14 via the iTunes Store.

=== Synopsis ===
A screenshot from the music video showing Rihanna's hand intertwined with that of a heavily tattooed man. Some critics believed the arm of the man resembled that of Chris Brown.

The music video opens with a view of Rihanna lying in open waters, as other scenes of diamonds being rolled in a manner suggestive of making a joint are intercut – a scene reminiscent of the single's artwork. As the video progresses Rihanna is shown running on a highway. In a black-and-white scene, Rihanna licks the joint and begins smoking it. The image fades to black as the song begins. Rihanna performs in the same black-and-white setting while in a black corset. Images of Rihanna on a bed in a room while singing are shown, with objects breaking, curtains falling and roses burning in reverse effect. Rihanna is shown again on the highway, running away from what appears to be the headlights of a chasing car. She then stops as she looks up to the night sky at an aurora view. Throughout the video, Rihanna's hand is shown intertwined with that of a heavily tattooed man, whose face is not shown in the video. As the second verse starts, Rihanna is shown in a desert where horses run freely. Scenes of a street battle are later shown, depicting burning cars and broken glass around the environment. As the video continues, the singer and her lover's hands are shown slowly slipping apart, with only their fingertips touching towards the conclusion of the video. The video ends with Rihanna once again floating alone in the open waters.

=== Reception ===
James Montgomery of MTV News called it visually striking and observed a great deal of "evocative imagery (glamorous black-and-white close-ups, thick plumes of translucent smoke, oversaturated hill-scapes, artfully silhouetted stallions)". He said that, like the song, the video is by turns garish and very intimate. The website's Jocelyn Vena thought that it had dreamlike and surrealistic images of Rihanna, who moves through set-ups that are occasionally exceptional. E! Online's Bruna Nessif said that the video shows an abundance of elaborate imagery, narratives, and especially a "mysterious and sexy" Rihanna. Additionally, she found it obvious that the body of a heavily tattooed man's arm, which Rihanna clings to desperately, is a reference to Chris Brown. NME magazine observed Rihanna being shown in four environments that represent the four elements of the earth, air, water and fire. Billy Johnson Jr. of Yahoo! Canada felt the video had failed to capture the song's vivid celebration of a love affair and stated, "It seems as though [Rihanna is] in chaos, reflecting on happier times." Marc Hogan of Spin concluded that the video was a "confirmation of Rihanna's awkward segue into adult-contemporary-dom." The video for "Diamonds" was Vevo's fourth most-viewed visual of 2013. As of September 2025, the music video has received over 2.4 billion views on YouTube.

== Live performances ==
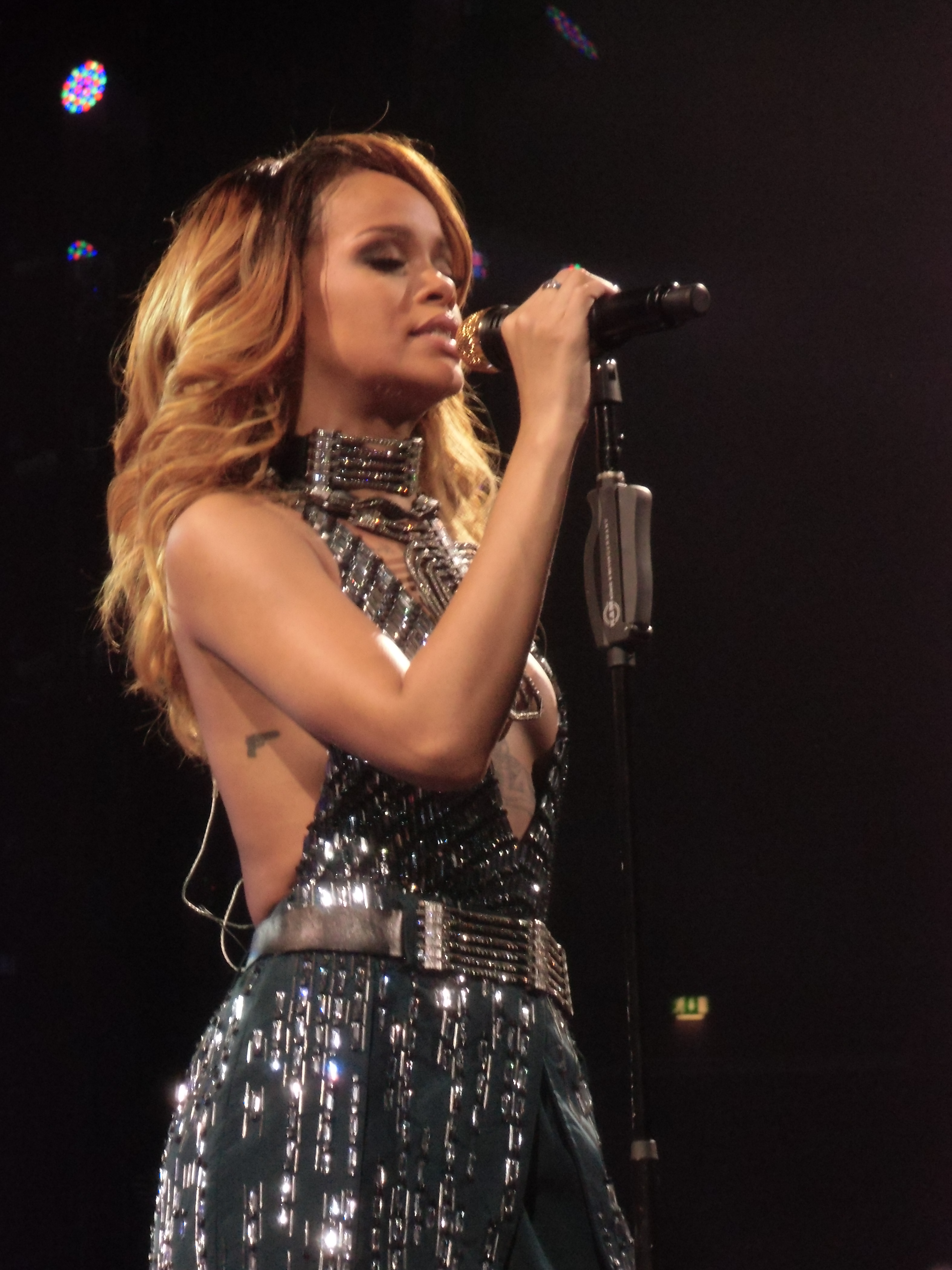
Rihanna performing "Diamonds" during the Diamonds World Tour in 2013

Rihanna first performed "Diamonds" on November 7, 2012, at the Victoria's Secret Fashion Show, where she wore black lingerie with black thigh high stockings and ankle boots; the show was aired by CBS on December 4. On November 10, Rihanna performed the song on Saturday Night Live. New York magazine's Joe Reid said that her performance was the highlight of the show's episode and favored the digitized background in particular, which he described as "overt weirdness" that was ultimately "pretty endearing". Tess Lynch of Grantland was impressed by Rihanna's "exceptional singing" and wrote that the background imagery was a "powerful" and "crazy spectacle that astonished viewers". Lynch agreed with episode host Anne Hathaway, who had said that Rihanna was "a goddess." "Diamonds" was included on the set list for Rihanna's 2012 promotional tour, the 777 Tour.

On November 25, the singer performed the song on series nine of The X Factor in the UK. The performance featured the singer dressed in a black gown on a square platform. As the chorus began, water effects poured down around her on the outside of the stage. By the final chorus, the water centered into the platform and wet the singer. Hayes of Irish Independent praised the performance and stated that it "put everything – and everybody – else to shame." On December 8, Rihanna performed the song on Wetten, dass..? in Germany. She also performed "Diamonds" on La Chanson de l'année in France, on December 10, 2012, which was broadcast on December 29, 2012. The single was included as the closing song on the set list of Rihanna's fifth worldwide tour titled the Diamonds World Tour (2013).

Rihanna performed "Diamonds" at the 2013 American Music Awards on November 24, 2013, during the acceptance of the Icon Award. The performance featured the singer wearing a long black dress plunged down to her navel and diamond adornments in her hair. She was joined by an orchestra that included a conductor which accompanied her as a rock band produced the beat. Kory Grow of Rolling Stone magazine labeled the performance as "stunning". Additionally, out of a total sixteen performances at the ceremony, he placed Rihanna's rendition of "Diamonds" first, writing, "she gave a performance that showed she could live up to the honor". Los Angeles Times' Mikael Wood stated that during the performance Rihanna dominated the stage pointing that she looked like a young version of Grace Jones. The single was included on the set list of Rihanna's joint 2014 tour with rapper Eminem, the Monster Tour. Rihanna performed "Diamonds" on November 11, 2014, during the Concert for Valor held in Washington, D.C. Rihanna performed the single during her concerts part of the Anti World Tour in 2016.

On February 12, 2023, Rihanna performed “Diamonds” as the closing number of the Super Bowl LVII halftime show.

== Cover versions and remixes ==
On BBC Radio 1's live lounge, Jessie Ware performed a slightly jazzy version of the song, which Spin magazine's Marc Hogan said was musically reminiscent of the xx and vocally similar to D'Angelo. Sia Furler, who co-wrote "Diamonds", performed it with a keyboard accompaniment at the Norwegian-American Achievement Ceremony on November 18. On November 15, American singer-songwriter Zola Jesus recorded a cover version of "Diamonds". "Diamonds" was used in the promotional video of Istanbul's bid for the 2020 Summer Olympics. Coaches Ricky Martin, Delta Goodrem, Joel Madden and Seal during the second season of Australian The Voice. On April 7, 2015, the song was covered by Team Adam (consisted of Brian Johnson, Deanna Johnson, Joshua Davis, Nathan Hermida and Tonya Boyd-Cannon) from the eighth season for the American version of The Voice. On May 14, 2015, coaches Jennifer Lopez, Keith Urban and Harry Connick, Jr. covered the song in a mash-up with Bruno Mars' 2013 single, "Locked Out of Heaven" during the final show of the fourteenth season of American Idol. English singer Calum Scott performed "Diamonds" during the final on series nine of Britain's Got Talent. English singer Gabrielle included a cover of "Diamonds" on her 2021 album Do It Again following a live performance of the song during an episode of The Masked Singer upon which she was a contestant as Harlequin.

"Diamonds" was remixed by rapper Flo Rida, whose version was premiered on November 12 by American magazine Rap-Up. He had previously performed on unofficial remixes of Rihanna's "We Found Love" and "Where Have You Been". The official remix of "Diamonds", which featured rapper Kanye West, was released on November 16 as a digital download via SoundCloud and iTunes. West's verse starts at the beginning of the remix, as he raps lines such as "We the cause of all the commotion / Your mouth runnin' by where is you goin?". He also quotes the theme song from The Fresh Prince of Bel-Air, while proclaiming to be "on his Brad Pitt". MTV News' James Montgomery wrote that "there's certainly no shortage of Kanye's patented swagger, and the new remix also adds some clubby wallop to the laid-back track." Henna Kathiya of MTV Rapfix remarked that West adds "some classic Ye flavor" to the original song. On December 4, a new remix leaked online. It featured Eve, who rapped lines such as, "You glisten so beautiful, priceless/ Listen to me, I need you to know/ How you can change my whole world."

=== Josef Salvat version ===
"Diamonds"

Single by Josef Salvat

from the album In Your Prime EP
- Released: December 19, 2014
- Length: 4:05
- Label: Columbia; RCA
- Songwriters: Sia Furler; Benjamin Levin; Mikkel Eriksen; Tor Hermansen

Josef Salvat singles chronology
"Diamonds" (2014)	"Open Season" (2014)

Australian artist Josef Salvat covered "Diamonds" in his EP In Your Prime (2014). The track became popular after Sony used it in its ad "Ice Bubbles" for its new 4K Ultra HD television screen. The Sony ad was filmed in Mount Whisler, Nunavut, Canada using Salvat's version of "Diamonds". Josef Salvat's version has reached number 2 on French SNEP Official Singles Charts also making it to number 11 on the German Singles Chart and number 18 on the Belgian Ultratop charts.

Charts

Chart (2014–15)	Peak position
Austria (Ö3 Austria Top 40)	46
Belgium (Ultratop 50 Wallonia)	18
France (SNEP)	2
Germany (GfK)	11
Switzerland (Schweizer Hitparade)	42
UK Singles (Official Charts)	72

Year-end charts

Chart (2015)	Position
Belgium (Ultratop Wallonia)	98

Certifications

Region	Certification	Certified units/sales
Germany (BVMI)	Gold	200,000^{‡}
^{‡} Sales+streaming figures based on certification alone.

== Formats and track listing ==
CD (2-track)

1. "Diamonds" – 3:45
2. "Diamonds" (the Bimbo Jones vocal remix) – 6:16

Digital download (remix)

1. "Diamonds" (Remix; featuring Kanye West) – 4:48

Digital download (remixes)

1. "Diamonds" (Dave Audé 100 edit) – 3:38
2. "Diamonds" (Gregor Salto radio edit) – 3:45
3. "Diamonds" (the Bimbo Jones vocal remix) – 6:17
4. "Diamonds" (the Bimbo Jones downtempo) – 3:14
5. "Diamonds" (the Bimbo Jones vocal edit) – 3:14
6. "Diamonds" (Congorock remix extended) – 5:54
7. "Diamonds" (Congorock remix) – 5:08
8. "Diamonds" (Jacob Plant dubstep remix) – 3:58

== Credits and personnel ==
Credits adapted from the liner notes of Unapologetic.

Locations

- Recorded at Roc the Mic Studios, New York City, New York; Westlake Recording Studios, Los Angeles, California
- Mixed at Ninja Club Studios, Atlanta, Georgia.

Personnel

- Songwriting – Sia Furler, Benjamin Levin, Mikkel Eriksen, Tor Hermansen
- Production – Benny Blanco, Stargate, Sia Furler
- Recording – Mikkel Eriksen, Miles Walker
- Recording assistant – Andrew "Muffman" Luftman
- Vocal Production – Kuk Harrell
- Vocal Recording – Kuk Harrell, Marcos Tovar
- Assistant Engineering – Blake Mares, Robert Cohen
- Mixing – Phil Tan
- Mixing assistant – Daniela Rivera
- Instrumentation – Benjamin Levin, Mikkel Eriksen, Tor Hermansen

== Charts ==
=== Weekly charts ===
Weekly chart performance
Chart (2012–2014)	Peak position
Australia (ARIA)	6
Austria (Ö3 Austria Top 40)	1
Belgium (Ultratop 50 Flanders)	3
Belgium (Ultratop Flanders Urban)	1
Belgium (Ultratop 50 Wallonia)	3
Brazil (Billboard Brasil Hot 100)	1
Brazil Hot Pop Songs	1
Bulgaria Airplay (BAMP)	1
Canada Hot 100 (Billboard)	1
CIS Airplay (TopHit)	1
Czech Republic Airplay (ČNS IFPI)	1
Czech Republic Singles Digital (ČNS IFPI)	96
Denmark (Tracklisten)	1
European Airplay (Nielsen Soundscan)	1
European Digital Sales (Billboard)	1
Finland (Suomen virallinen lista)	1
France (SNEP)	1
Germany (GfK)	1
Greece (IFPI)	1
Hungary (Rádiós Top 40)	7
Hungary (Single Top 40)	9
Ireland (IRMA)	2
Israel International Airplay (Media Forest)	1
Italy (FIMI)	3
Italian Airplay (EarOne)	1
Japan Hot 100 (Billboard)	24
Lebanese Airplay (Lebanese Top 20)	2
Luxembourg Digital Songs (Billboard)	1
Mexican Airplay (Billboard)	2
Mexican Airplay (Monitor Latino)	6
Netherlands (Dutch Top 40)	3
Netherlands (Single Top 100)	4
New Zealand (Recorded Music NZ)	2
Norway (VG-lista)	1
Poland Airplay (ZPAV)	3
Portuguese Digital Sales (AFP)	1
Romanian Airplay (Airplay 100)	1
Romania Airplay (Media Forest)	1
Romania TV Airplay (Media Forest)	1
Russia Airplay (TopHit)	1
Russia (Billboard Hot 50 Airplay)	1
Scottish Singles Sales (Official Charts)	1
Slovakia (IFPI)	1
Slovakia Singles Digital (ČNS IFPI)	95
Slovenia (SloTop50)	30
South Korea (Circle)	3
Spain (Promusicae)	2
Sweden (Sverigetopplistan)	2
Switzerland (Schweizer Hitparade)	1
UK Radio Airplay (Nielsen Soundscan)	2
UK Singles (Official Charts)	1 (Note: The peak position on the UK Singles Chart was for a sales-only chart. The song peaked on October 7, 2012, a year-and-a-half before data from the streaming chart was added to the methodology.)
UK Streaming (Official Charts)	1
UK TV Airplay (Nielsen Soundscan)	22
UK Hip Hop/R&B (Official Charts)	1
Ukraine Airplay (TopHit)	5
US Billboard Hot 100	1
US Adult Contemporary (Billboard)	27
US Adult Pop Airplay (Billboard)	14
US Dance Club Songs (Billboard)	1
US Dance Airplay (Billboard)	2
US Hot R&B/Hip-Hop Songs (Billboard)	1
US Pop Airplay (Billboard)	2
US Rhythmic Airplay (Billboard)	1
Venezuela (Record Report)	3

2023 weekly chart performance
Chart (2023)	Peak position
Canada (Canadian Hot 100)	38
Global 200 (Billboard)	40
Portugal (AFP)	187
US Billboard Hot 100	44

=== Year-end charts ===
2012 year-end chart performance
Chart (2012)	Position
Australia (ARIA)	32
Australia Urban (ARIA)	8
Austria (Ö3 Austria Top 40)	19
Belgium (Ultratop 50 Flanders)	31
Belgium (Ultratop Flanders Urban)	6
Belgium (Ultratop 50 Wallonia)	26
Brazil (Crowley)	55
Canada (Canadian Hot 100)	69
Denmark (Tracklisten)	9
Finland (Suomen virallinen lista)	13
France (SNEP)	10
Germany (Official German Charts)	7
Hungary (Rádiós Top 40)	59
Ireland (IRMA)	14
Italy (FIMI)	20
Italy Airplay (EarOne)	57
Israel (Media Forest)	31
Netherlands (Dutch Top 40)	35
Netherlands (Single Top 100)	20
New Zealand (Recorded Music NZ)	23
Poland (ZPAV)	16
Russia Airplay (TopHit)	144
South Korea Foreign (Circle)	51
Spain (PROMUSICAE)	31
Sweden (Sverigetopplistan)	30
Switzerland (Schweizer Hitparade)	17
UK Singles (OCC)	11
US Billboard Hot 100	94

2013 year-end chart performance
Chart (2013)	Position
Australia (ARIA)	68
Australia Urban (ARIA)	9
Austria (Ö3 Austria Top 40)	64
Belgium (Ultratop 50 Flanders)	34
Belgium (Ultratop Flanders Urban)	11
Belgium (Ultratop 50 Wallonia)	19
Brazil (Crowley)	22
Canada (Canadian Hot 100)	27
Denmark (Tracklisten)	33
Finland (Suomen virallinen lista)	11
Germany (Official German Charts)	52
Israel (Media Forest)	11
Italy (FIMI)	27
Italy Airplay (EarOne)	59
Moldova (Media Forest)	2
Netherlands (Dutch Top 40)	40
Netherlands (Single Top 100)	40
Poland (IFPI Poland)	3
Portugal (IFPI)	5
Russia Airplay (TopHit)	4
South Korea Foreign (Circle)	111
Spain (PROMUSICAE)	16
Sweden (Sverigetopplistan)	27
Switzerland (Schweizer Hitparade)	11
UK Singles (OCC)	54
Ukraine Airplay (TopHit)	8
US Billboard Hot 100	27
US Dance Club Songs (Billboard)	32
US Dance/Mix Show Airplay (Billboard)	18
US Hot R&B/Hip-Hop Songs (Billboard)	6
US Mainstream Top 40 (Billboard)	35
US Radio Songs (Billboard)	22
US Rhythmic (Billboard)	11

2014 year-end chart performance
Chart (2014)	Position
Australia Urban (ARIA)	35
Spain Streaming (PROMUSICAE)	99

2023 year-end chart performance
Chart (2023)	Position
Hungary (Rádiós Top 40)	90

2024 year-end chart performance
Chart (2024)	Position
Hungary (Rádiós Top 40)	84

2025 year-end chart performance
Chart (2025)	Position
Hungary (Rádiós Top 40)	99

=== Decade-end charts ===
2010s-end chart performance
Chart (2010–2019)	Position
Australia (ARIA)	72
Germany (Official German Charts)	43
UK Singles (OCC)	98
US Hot R&B/Hip-Hop Songs (Billboard)	28

=== All-time charts ===
Chart	Rank
Dutch Love Songs (Dutch Top 40)	8

== Certifications ==
Certifications and sales
Region	Certification	Certified units/sales
Australia (ARIA)	13× Platinum	910,000^{‡}
Austria (IFPI Austria)	Gold	15,000^{*}
Belgium (BRMA)	Platinum	30,000^{*}
Brazil (Pro-Música Brasil)	6× Diamond	1,500,000^{‡}
Canada (Music Canada)	Gold	40,000^{*}
Denmark (IFPI Danmark)	Platinum	30,000^{^}
Finland (Musiikkituottajat)	Platinum	25,369
France	—	310,000
Germany (BVMI)	4× Platinum	1,200,000^{‡}
Italy (FIMI)	4× Platinum	120,000^{‡}
New Zealand (RMNZ)	5× Platinum	150,000^{‡}
Poland (ZPAV)	Diamond	250,000^{‡}
Portugal (AFP)	2× Platinum	40,000^{‡}
Spain (Promusicae)	2× Platinum	120,000^{‡}
Sweden (GLF)	6× Platinum	240,000^{‡}
Switzerland (IFPI Switzerland)	4× Platinum	120,000^{^}
United Kingdom (BPI)	4× Platinum	2,400,000^{‡}
United States (RIAA)	Diamond	10,000,000^{‡}
Streaming
Greece (IFPI Greece)	Gold	1,000,000^{†}
Denmark (IFPI Danmark)	4× Platinum	7,200,000^{†}
^{*} Sales figures based on certification alone.^{^} Shipments figures based on certification alone.^{‡} Sales+streaming figures based on certification alone.^{†} Streaming-only figures based on certification alone.

== Release history ==
Release dates and formats
Region	Date	Format	Version	Label	Ref.
Italy	September 26, 2012	Radio airplay	Original	Universal	
United States	September 26, 2012	Radio airplay	Original	Def Jam	
Canada	September 27, 2012	Digital download	Original	Def Jam	
United States	September 27, 2012	Digital download	Original	Def Jam	
Germany	September 28, 2012	Digital download	Original	Def Jam	
United Kingdom	September 28, 2012	Digital download	Original	Def Jam	
United States	October 2, 2012	Contemporary hit radio	Original	Def Jam	
United States	October 2, 2012	Rhythmic contemporary radio	Original	Def Jam	
Germany	November 5, 2012	CD	2-track	Def Jam	
Various	November 16, 2012	Digital download	Remix featuring Kanye West	Def Jam	
Various	December 18, 2012	Digital download	Remixes	Def Jam	

== See also ==
- List of Airplay 100 number ones
- List of number-one hits of 2012 (Austria)
- List of number-one pop hits of 2012 (Brazil)
- List of Canadian Hot 100 number-one singles of 2012
- List of number-one hits of 2012 (Denmark)
- List of number-one singles of 2012 (Finland)
- List of number-one hits of 2012 (France)
- List of number-one hits of 2012 (Germany)
- List of number-one hits of 2013 (Germany)
- List of number-one songs in Norway
- List of UK Singles Chart number ones of the 2010s
- List of UK R&B Singles Chart number ones of 2012
- List of number-one digital songs of 2012 (U.S.)
- List of number-one R&B/hip-hop songs of 2012 (U.S.)
- List of Billboard Hot 100 number ones of 2012
- List of Billboard Hot 100 top-ten singles in 2012
- List of Radio Songs number ones of the 2010s
- List of Billboard Dance Club Songs number ones of 2012
- List of million-selling singles in the United Kingdom
- List of highest-certified singles in Australia
