= Rihanna 777 Documentary... 7Countries7Days7Shows =

2013 live music video by Rihanna

- Blu-ray/DVD cover
- Genre: Concert
- Directed by: Toby L; Nicholas Abbott
- Starring: Rihanna; Jay-Z; Jay Brown
- Theme music composer: Calvin Harris; StarGate; Terius Nash; Shaffer Smith; Mikky Ekko; Parker Ighile; Christopher Stewart; Sia Furler
- Country of origin: United States
- Original language: English

Production
- Running time: 77 minutes

Original release
- Network: Fox
- Release: May 7, 2013

Rihanna 777 Documentary... 7Countries7Days7Shows is the third live long-form video by Barbadian singer Rihanna. It was released on May 7, 2013, by Def Jam Recordings. An edited version aired on May 6 on the Fox Network. It features a behind-the-scenes look at the singer's 777 Tour, a seven-date tour where she performed seven concerts in seven cities in seven countries, accompanied by a group of fans and more than 150 journalists, to support her sixth studio album Talk That Talk (2011) and promote her seventh studio album Unapologetic (2012).

== Background ==
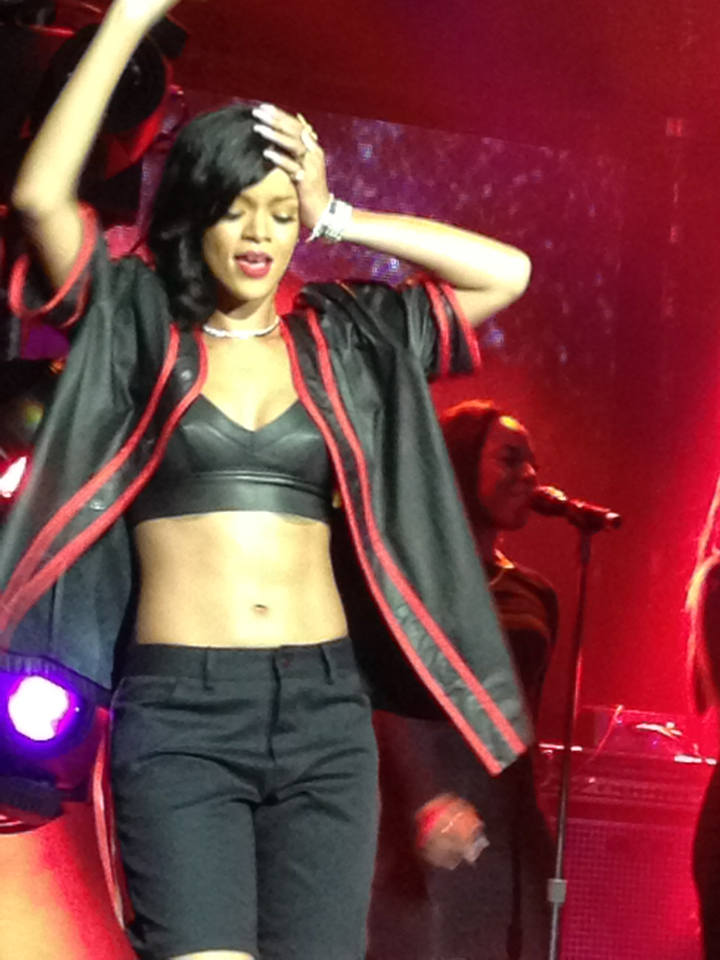
Rihanna performing during the 777 Tour in Mexico City

In March 2012, Rihanna began "working on the new sound" for her seventh studio album, even though she had not yet begun recording. On September 12, 2012, Def Jam France announced via Twitter that Rihanna would release a new single the upcoming week while her seventh studio album was scheduled to be released in November 2012. On October 11, 2012, in one of her tweets, she revealed the title of her new album, Unapologetic, along with its cover.

To further promote Unapologetic, on November 14, 2012, Rihanna embarked on a seven-date promotional tour entitled 777 Tour. She performed seven concerts, each in a different city in North America and Europe in seven days to promote the release of the album. The tour was promoted and supported by HTC Corporation; during the 777 tour, Rihanna was joined by elite group of fans and 150 journalists which represented 82 countries. They flew with the singer aboard a chartered Boeing 777 twinjet to every venue she visited during the course of the tour. The 777 Tour started on November 14 in Mexico City and continued on November 15 in Toronto, November 16 in Stockholm, November 17 in Paris, November 18 in Berlin, November 19 in London and ended on November 20 in New York City.

Following its end, the tour was met with criticism from the journalists accompanying Rihanna. Although they found it innovative and interesting, they criticized the concerts and travel delays and Rihanna's non-presence on the parties held on the jet. In an interview with BBC Radio 1, the singer clarified her absence from the parties and said that it was a result of her resting so she could save her voice for the shows, "They all want you to host a party every time you get on the plane after a show but you really only have that time to sleep until you get to the next country... Sometimes it was a two-hour ride to the next country, and that was all the sleep you would get." Despite the criticism, following the end of the 777 Tour, both Unapologetic and the lead single "Diamonds" reached number one on the US Billboard 200 and Hot 100 charts respectively.

== Release ==
Rihanna 777 Documentary

Video by Rihanna

Rihanna video chronology
Loud Tour Live at the O2 (2012)	Rihanna 777 Documentary (2013)

The documentary was announced on March 19, 2013. On April 4, the first official trailer for the documentary was released. The preview shows Rihanna boarding on a plane and also later preparing for a show along with the tagline, "One woman takes on the world". A second trailer was released on April 16 on Rihanna's official website. It features the captain of the jet talking, the singer and her crew preparing for the shows, and intercut scenes on the jet of the journalists and fans. Rihanna 777 aired on May 6 on Fox Network in the United States. Apart from that, on April 23 Roc Nation announced that the film will be released in DVD format and will feature several performances of Rihanna's songs including "Diamonds" and "Stay". Rihanna 777 in DVD format was released on May 7 in Australia, Canada, Germany, Italy, Japan, Spain, Sweden and the United States, on May 10 in the Netherlands and Poland and on June 3 in France.

== Setlist ==
1. "Cockiness (Love It)"
2. "Birthday Cake" (Remix)
3. "Talk That Talk"
4. "Wait Your Turn"
5. "Man Down"
6. "Only Girl (In the World)"
7. "Don't Stop the Music"
8. "S&M"
9. "Phresh Out the Runway"
10. "Unfaithful"
11. "Take a Bow"
12. "Hate That I Love You"
13. "Where Have You Been" (contains excerpts of "Take Care")
14. "Run This Town" (JAY-Z cover)
15. "Live Your Life" (T.I. cover)
16. "All of the Lights" (Kanye West cover)
17. "Love the Way You Lie" (Eminem cover)
18. "Stay"
19. "Diamonds"
20. "Umbrella"
21. "We Found Love"

== Charts ==
Chart (2012)	Peak position
Belgian Music DVD Chart (Wallonia)	2
Czech Music DVD Chart	18
Dutch Music DVD Chart	28
French Music DVD Chart	2
Italian Music DVD Chart	19
Spanish Music Video Chart	15
Swiss Music DVD Chart	9
UK Music Video Chart	42
US Music Video Sales (Billboard)	7

== Certifications ==
Region	Certification	Certified units/sales
Brazil (Pro-Música Brasil)	Gold	30,000^{*}
^{*} Sales figures based on certification alone.

== Release history ==
Country	Date	Format	Label
Australia	May 7, 2013	DVD	Universal Music Group
Canada	May 7, 2013	DVD	Def Jam Recordings
Germany	May 7, 2013	DVD	Universal Music Group
Italy	May 7, 2013	DVD	Universal Music Group
Japan	May 7, 2013	DVD	Universal Music Group
Spain	May 7, 2013	DVD	Universal Music Group
Sweden	May 7, 2013	DVD	Universal Music Group
United States	May 7, 2013	DVD	Def Jam Recordings
Netherlands	May 10, 2013	DVD	Universal Music Group
Poland	May 10, 2013	DVD	Universal Music Group
France	June 3, 2013	DVD	Def Jam Recordings
