= What Now (song) =

Single by Rihanna

from the album Unapologetic
- Released: August 29, 2013
- Recorded: 2012
- Studio: Metropolis Studios (London), Westlake Recording Studios (Los Angeles)
- Genre: Pop; dubstep; R&B
- Length: 4:03
- Label: Def Jam; SRP
- Songwriters: Olivia Waithe; Robyn Fenty; Parker Ighile; Nathan Cassells; Maestro The Baker
- Producers: Parker Ighile; Maestro The Baker; Kuk Harrell

Rihanna singles chronology
"Bad" (remix) (2013)	"What Now" (2013)	"The Monster" (2013)

Music video
- "What Now" on YouTube

"What Now" is a song recorded by the Barbadian singer Rihanna for her seventh album, Unapologetic (2012). It was written by Olivia Waithe, Parker Ighile, Maestro The Baker and Nathan Cassells with production handled by Maestro The Baker, Ighile and Cassells. A remix collection was released exclusively to Beatport on August 29, 2013 and later via iTunes, Amazon, and Google Play on September 17, 2013. The single was serviced to US rhythmic radio on September 24, 2013, before impacting mainstream radio on October 1, 2013, as the fifth single from Unapologetic. Another remix collection was released to Beatport on October 29, 2013. The song is a mid-tempo piano ballad which incorporates sounds which resemble "sonic bombs" during the chorus and "crashing" drums.

"What Now" received generally positive reviews from music critics, with many calling it an emotional, stand-out song on the album and praising Rihanna's vocals. Following the release of Unapologetic, "What Now" made appearances on various charts around the world. Following its release as a single, the song re-peaked in multiple territories, having it also reach new peaks at number 25 on the US Billboard Hot 100 and number 25 on the UK Singles Chart, while topping the US Dance Club Songs chart and attaining a top three peak on the UK Hip Hop and R&B Singles Chart.

The song's accompanying music video was directed by Jeff Nicholas, Jonathan Craven, and Darren Craig from Uprising Creativity. It portrays Rihanna having an "emotional breakdown" and performing exorcism-type dance moves. Critics complimented the video and compared it to Rihanna's 2008 video for the song "Disturbia". Rihanna promoted "What Now" on Alan Carr: Chatty Man and the song is included on the set list of her Diamonds World Tour (2013). British television network ITV used the song for their "Where Drama Lives" 2014 advertisement.

== Production and release ==
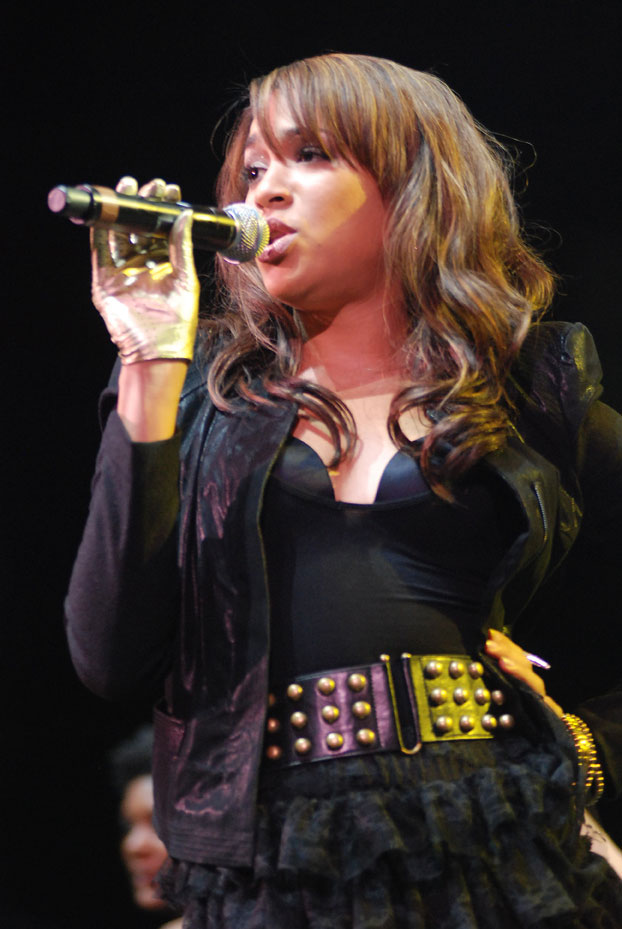
Livvi Franc co-wrote "What Now".

Rihanna began "working on the new sound" for her seventh studio album in March 2012, even though she had not yet begun recording. On September 12, 2012, Def Jam France announced via Twitter that Rihanna would release a new single the upcoming week while her seventh studio album was scheduled to be released in November 2012. On October 11, 2012, in one of her tweets revealed that the title of her new album is Unapologetic along with its cover.

"What Now" was written by British singer-songwriter Livvi Franc together with Rihanna, Parker Ighile, Maestro The Baker and Nathan Cassells. Ighile, Maestro and Cassells recorded the music for the track in Metropolis Studios located in London, United Kingdom, and provided all of the instrumentation and programming. Kuk Harrell provided the vocal production of the song and also recorded Rihanna's vocals together with Marcos Tovar at Westlake Recording Studios in Los Angeles, California. Blake Mares and Robert Cohen served as assistant vocal engineer of "What Now". It was mixed by Phil Tan at Ninja Club Studios in Atlanta, Georgia with Daniela Rivera serving as assistant mixing engineer.

"What Now" was released as the sixth single from the album Unapologetic. Ten remixes of the song were digitally released via Beatport on August 28, 2013, in the United States. The same remixes, were also added on the iTunes Store on September 17. "What Now" was serviced to rhythmic contemporary radio in the United States on September 24. It was later sent to contemporary hit radio on October 1. Via her Instagram account, Rihanna revealed the official artwork for the song on October 16. It features the singer dressed in black and "stares out with piercing eyes" while her name is written on chalkboard behind her. Jocelyn Vena of MTV News described Rihanna's style on the artwork as goth and noted that it is reminiscent of the behind-the-scenes shot she posted during filming the song's video.

== Composition ==
"What Now" is a piano-led mid tempo pop and R&B ballad which lasts four minutes and three seconds. According to Sony/ATV Music Publishing's digital sheet music for the song, it is composed in the key of G♯ minor and set in compound duple meter (6/8 time) with a moderately slow groove of 60 beats per minute. Rihanna's vocals span from the low note of A♯_{3} to the high note of C♯_{5}. "What Now" follows a chord progression of G♯m–B2–F♯–F♯sus4–F♯. The instrumental features "crashing" drums; Dean Martin of NME described it as a 'bonkers marriage of pianos and bass-pop'. According to Mesfin Fekadu of The Huffington Post, the song "builds nicely from its calming verse to its electrified hook."

The Urban Daily's Smokey D. Fountaine compared "What Now" to the works by singer Pink as according to him contains "yell-as-long-as-you-have-a-great-hook style". Its structure "flips" from verse to chorus "like they’re from two different planets", according to Michael Gallucci of PopCrush. Gallucci also felt that Rihanna's over-sings on the track, in contrast with Chris Younie of 4Music who said that Rihanna sounds "sweet". During the "roaring" chorus, sounds which resemble "sonic bombs" are included in the background.

== Critical reception ==
A Billboard reviewer praised "What Now" and called the song an "emotional highlight on an album filled with moments of resonance in its second half." Giovanny Caquias of Culture Blues wrote that the song feels like the first "candid" and "insightful" track on Unapologetic. He continued, "Rihanna gets a little introspective on What Now, and doesn't resort to being overtly sexual or defiantly callous (more on that later), which gave me the feeling that she stripped away her armor for a moment and actually allowed herself to be 'real'." Daily News Jim Farber wrote that the song shows a heft.

Brad Stern of MTV Buzzworthy praised Rihanna's vocals on the song and referred to it as a "most poignant offering on the record". The Star-Ledger's reviewer labelled the song as "staggering power ballad that makes all her other mid-tempo numbers sound featherweight by comparison." Andy Kellman of AllMusic praised "What Now" and called it a "massive, slamming, wailing power ballad". Jon Caramanica of The New York Times positively reviewed the song writing, "Rihanna is doing some of her most direct, ambitious singing here. It’s the album’s one real purge, and a sign of a pulse beneath the armor." Genevieve Koski for The A.V. Club criticised "What Now", writing that it (as well as "Stay") are the types of "milquetoast ballads" which have never been Rihanna's speciality.

== Commercial performance ==
Upon the release of Unapologetic, "What Now" charted in France and on two charts in the United Kingdom due to strong digital download sales. It debuted on the French Singles Chart at number 144 for the week dated December 1, 2012, and remained on the chart for one week. On July 13, 2013, it re-entered the chart at number 174; the song peaked at number 52 one month later, on August 17, 2013. On December 2, 2012, it debuted at number 165 on the UK Singles Chart, and number 32 on the UK Hip Hop and R&B Singles Chart. "What Now" was later serviced to radio in Australia as the fourth single from the album. It debuted at number 37 on the ARIA Singles Chart on August 18, 2013, and peaked at number 21. According to IFPI, the song has sold 2 million copies worldwide.

== Music video ==
=== Production and synopsis ===
The double-exposure body shots throughout the video were compared to the ones of "Tunnel Vision" visual which direction included Jeff Nicholas and Jonathan Craven.

Rihanna shot the music video for "What Now" inside a warehouse in Phuket, Thailand on September 17, 2013, during a tour stop of the Diamonds World Tour. It was directed by Jeff Nicholas, Jonathan Craven, and Darren Craig from Uprising Creativity. Nicholas and Craven previously worked on the video for Justin Timberlake's single "Tunnel Vision" from his third studio album The 20/20 Experience. According to Steven Gottlieb of VideoStatic the double-exposure body shots are a visible common similarity of the two videos. On November 13, Rihanna unveiled a behind-the-scenes video via her official Vevo account. During it she explained the concept of the video, "It's gonna be kind of eerie, very creepy because 'What Now' is one of those songs that you can get really boring with the visual. You can get really almost expected. Everybody's probably expecting narrative type of video, a love story of some sorts or something really soft and pretty" and then says, "It is pretty and kind of soft, but it's really a little demented." Prior to the video's release, Rihanna posted a sneak peek of the video on YouTube. The official music video was released to VEVO on November 15, 2013.

Rob Newman is the producer of the video, while Craven, Nicholas and Thananath Songchaikul executively produced the visual. Sing Howe Yam performed the direction of the photography while Clark Eddy is the editor. The video opens to Rihanna appearing on a static television screen in a simple nude gown and crucifix necklace. She then begins to sing whilst being in a darkened room with a black gown on and later appearing in a brightened room with a white gown on. The video switches between the creepy and the pretty Rihanna as she mopes in a sparse warehouse space, possessed by her loneliness.

=== Reception ===
Jocelyn Vena of MTV compared the video to four of Rihanna's past videos, with "Disturbia" being one of the four, she says "both 'What Now' and 'Disturbia' have a dark, supernatural vibe about them. And in addition to sharing that similarity, the visuals' shots are layered, giving off a sort of 3-D effect." Other comparisons included were "Diamonds" and "Stay", which is also included on her 2012 Unapologetic, and "We Found Love". Even Rachel Brodsky of MTV's Buzzworthy Blog used seven comparisons of how the video relates to the 1996 film The Craft. Jason Lipshutz of Billboard says that Rihanna "dials it down" for the video after the "twerking, pole-dancing and general skin-showing" video she released for "Pour It Up" the month before. Other reviewers gave similar opinions, as an anonymous reviewer of The Huffington Post says "The clip shows the 25-year-old singer in a spooky place, writhing in a sparse room shot in a fashion similar to many horror movies."

== Live performances ==
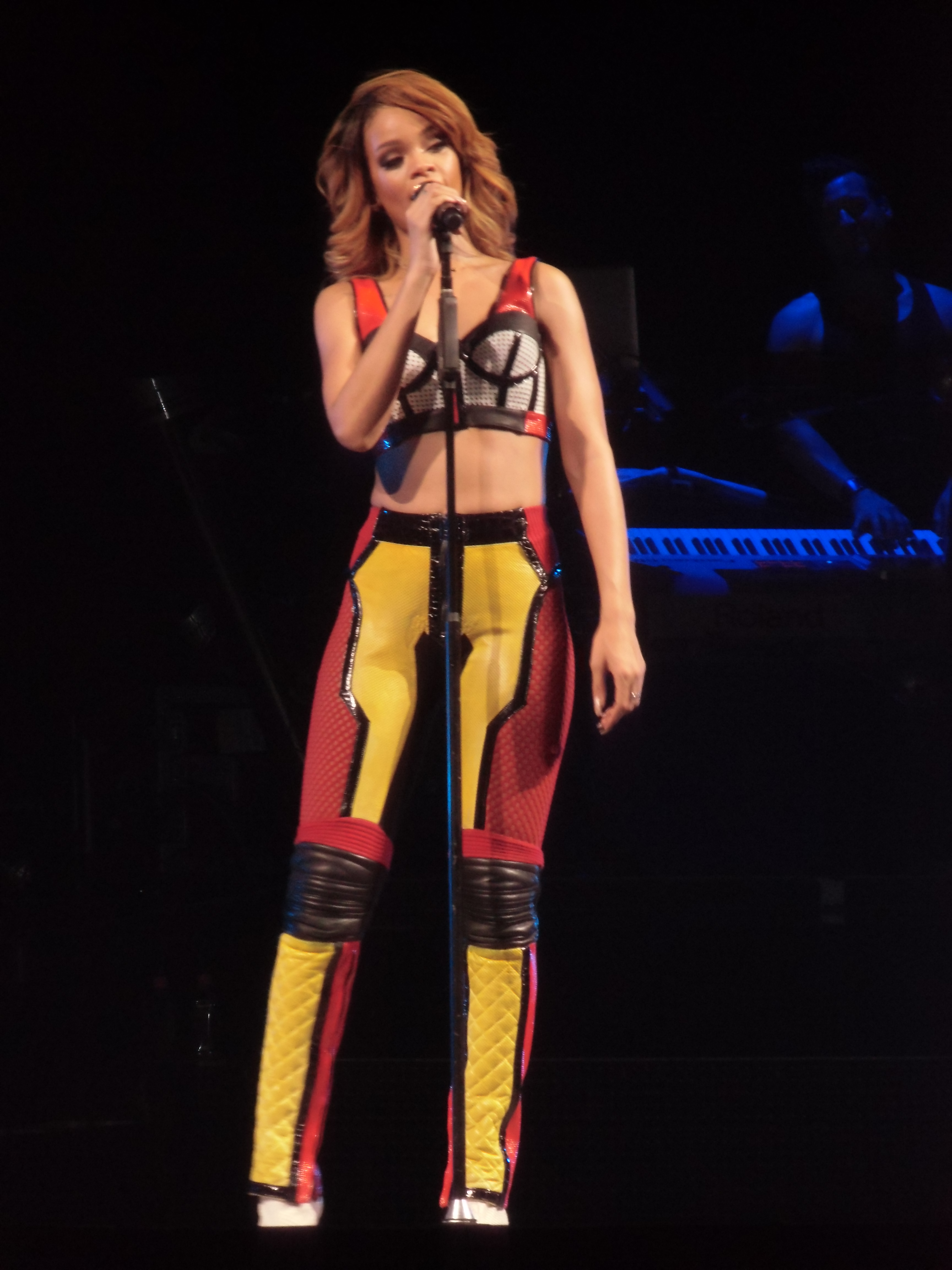
Rihanna performing the song during her Diamonds World Tour

On September 27, 2013, Rihanna performed the song on Channel 4's Alan Carr: Chatty Man. It is also included on the set list of her Diamonds World Tour (2013).

== Credits and personnel ==
Recording

- Recorded at Metropolis Studios, London, United Kingdom.
- Vocals recorded at Westlake Recording Studios, Los Angeles, California.
- Mixed at Ninja Club Studios, Atlanta, Georgia.

Personnel

- Songwriting – Olivia Waithe, Robyn Fenty, Parker Ighile, Nathan Cassells, Ifeoluwa Oladigbolu
- Production – Ighile, Cassells, Oladigbolu
- Recording engineers – Ighile, Cassells
- Assistant vocal engineer – Blake Mares, Robert Cohen
- Vocal recording – Kuk Harrell, Marcos Tovar
- Vocal production – Kuk Harrell
- Mixing – Phil Tan
- Additional/assistant engineering – Daniela Rivera
- Instruments and programming – Ighile, Cassells, Maestro The Baker

Credits adapted from the liner notes of Unapologetic, Def Jam Recordings, SRP Records.

== Track listing ==
Digital download (remixes)
No.	Title	Length
1.	"What Now" (Firebeatz remix)	5:03
2.	"What Now" (Firebeatz radio edit)	3:15
3.	"What Now" (Firebeatz instrumental)	5:03
4.	"What Now" (R3hab remix)	4:51
5.	"What Now" (R3hab edit)	3:24
6.	"What Now" (R3hab instrumental)	4:51
7.	"What Now" (Guy Scheiman club mix)	7:04
8.	"What Now" (Guy Scheiman radio edit)	4:03
9.	"What Now" (Guy Scheiman mixshow edit)	4:29
10.	"What Now" (Guy Scheiman dub)	7:04
Total length:		49:07

Digital download (remixes part 2)
No.	Title	Length
1.	"What Now" (R3hab trapped out remix)	3:33
2.	"What Now" (Reflex extended)	3:34
3.	"What Now" (Reflex radio edit)	3:03
Total length:		10:10

== Charts ==
=== Weekly charts ===
Weekly chart performance
Chart (2012−2013)	Peak position
Australia (ARIA)	21
Austria (Ö3 Austria Top 40)	67
Belgium (Ultratip Bubbling Under Flanders)	3
Belgium (Ultratip Bubbling Under Wallonia)	8
Brazil Hot 100 Airplay (Billboard Brasil)	46
Brazil (Brazil Hot Pop)	11
Canada Hot 100 (Billboard)	27
Czech Republic Airplay (ČNS IFPI)	25
Finland Airplay (Radiosoittolista)	45
France (SNEP)	52
Germany (GfK)	49
Ireland (IRMA)	21
Netherlands (Dutch Top 40)	24
Netherlands (Single Top 100)	52
New Zealand (Recorded Music NZ)	13
Romania (Airplay 100)	45
Scottish Singles Sales (Official Charts)	22
Sweden (Sverigetopplistan)	46
UK Singles (Official Charts)	21
UK Hip Hop/R&B (Official Charts)	3
US Billboard Hot 100	25
US Dance Airplay (Billboard)	18
US Dance Club Songs (Billboard)	1
US Pop Airplay (Billboard)	21
US Rhythmic Airplay (Billboard)	24

=== Year-end charts ===
Year-end chart performance
Chart (2013)	Position
Netherlands (Dutch Top 40)	149
US Dance Club Songs (Billboard)	30

== Certifications ==
Certifications
Region	Certification	Certified units/sales
Australia (ARIA)	2× Platinum	140,000^{‡}
Brazil (Pro-Música Brasil)	2× Platinum	120,000^{‡}
New Zealand (RMNZ)	Platinum	30,000^{‡}
United Kingdom (BPI)	Gold	400,000^{‡}
United States (RIAA)	Platinum	1,000,000^{‡}
^{‡} Sales+streaming figures based on certification alone.

== Release history ==
Release history
Region	Date	Format	Version	Label	Ref.
United States	August 29, 2013	Digital download	Remixes	Def Jam	
United States	September 24, 2013	Rhythmic contemporary radio	Original	Def Jam	
United States	October 1, 2013	Contemporary hit radio	Original	Def Jam	
Italy	October 4, 2013	Radio airplay	Original	Universal	
United States	October 29, 2013	Digital download	Remixes part 2	Def Jam	

== See also ==
- List of Billboard Dance Club Songs number ones of 2013
