= Chicago stepping =

American urban dance

Chicago-Style Stepping (also known as Steppin') is a dance that originated in Chicago and continues to evolve nationwide and overseas, while defining its unique style and culture. within urban community. "Chicago-Style Stepping" makes reference to other urban styles of dance found throughout the United States in urban enclaves such as Detroit, Cleveland, Baltimore and Washington, D.C.

== Origins ==
Stepping is a partner dances that began in Chicago during the big band era came from the east coast Swing dances the Jitter Bug and the Lindy Hop. The Bop emerged in the late 1950s and 1960s when dancing at clubs and ballrooms flourished in the city. The Bop was directly influenced by the music of Chess Records and Motown Records. The basic pattern of the Chicago Bop was like most 6 count Swing dances. The Chicago Bop Style was similar to the "Philly Bop" as seen on the American Bandstand television show. The youth of the late 60's in the high schools of Chicago began changing the movement of the partner dance from a circular rotation to a straight line featuring a north and south pattern. During the 60's Chicagoans did not refer to the partner dance as bopping or stepping instead people simply said they were "dancing" however all dancers of that era acknowledged the Chicago Bop as the original dance. The basic characteristics of the Chicago Bop was smooth, cool, less acrobatic and done with one hand. In 1971 with the release of the JB's song entitled "Gimmie Some More" the younger generation of dancers created another variation of the partner which was called "The New Bop". The NEW BOP is the foundation of what is known as Stepping Today. With music fueled by the JB's, the youth from the streets of Chicago changed the pattern of the partner dance from one hand to 2 hands and the body motion from front to back to side to side. Years later, in 1974 a DJ/Prompter by the name of Sam Chatman saw a couple dancing and when the two separated Sam announced during the party "it looks like they are "Stepping" and the name Stepping became popular for the partner dance.

The term Chicago "Bop" was used to describe the dance form by Chicagoans until the early 1970s. Prior to that time "Bop" was a universally known term with its origin beginning sometime between 1945 & 1950 to express music and dance. The dance known as Chicago Stepping' evolved from the New Bop and is more likely a derivative of several east coast swing dances. No published syllabuses exist for the dance. Chicago-Style Stepping is an exclusive local dance and gained a foothold on radio in 1989 when a local radio station, WVAZ (102.7 FM) began playing music on Saturday Night. Prior to commercial radio expressing interest in "Steppers" music a college radio station WKKC FM 89.3 in 1975 began programming with Steppers Music.

=== Popularity ===
Stepping in Chicago goes back to the late 1940s early 1950s. Originally called Bopping, it evolved with soul music. Stepping remained popular, even as Hip Hop and Rap music came along, and is mainstream in urban dance.

Artist such as Grover Washington, Jr.; Michael Jackson; Earth, Wind and Fire; Average White Band; and especially James Brown (J.B.'s Mono-rail) all had hot stepping tunes aside from many others.

R. Kelly's songs Step in The Name of Love released in 2003 and Happy People released in 2004 had videos that featured Stepping which helped move the dance into the national mainstream culture.

== See also ==
- Footwork (Chicago)
- Step dance
