= Man Down (song) =

2011 single by Rihanna

Single by Rihanna

from the album Loud
- Released: May 3, 2011
- Recorded: 2010
- Studio: The Village; Westlake Recording Studios
- Genre: Dancehall; reggae
- Length: 4:28
- Label: Def Jam; SRP
- Songwriters: Shama "SAK PASE" Joseph; Timothy Thomas; Theron Thomas; Shontelle Layne; Robyn Fenty
- Producers: Sham "Sak Pase" Joseph; Kuk Harrell; Bobby Campbell

Rihanna singles chronology
"S&M" (2011)	"Man Down" (2011)	"California King Bed" (2011)

Music video
- "Man Down" on YouTube

"Man Down" is a song by Barbadian singer Rihanna from her fifth studio album, Loud (2010). Rihanna, fellow Bajan singer Shontelle, and production duo R. City wrote the song with its main producer, Sham "Sak Pase". They wrote it during a writing camp, in Los Angeles of March 2010, held by Rihanna's record label to gather compositions for possible inclusion on the then-untitled album. Rock City were inspired by Bob Marley's 1973 song "I Shot the Sheriff" and set out to create a song which embodied the same feel, but from a female perspective. "Man Down" is a reggae song which incorporates elements of ragga and electronic music. Lyrically, Rihanna is a fugitive after she shoots a man, an action she later regrets. Several critics singled out "Man Down" as Loud's highlight, while others commented on her prominent West Indian accent and vocal agility.

Def Jam released "Man Down" on May 3, 2011, as the fifth single from the album. In the United States, the single reached number 59 on the Billboard Hot 100 and number nine on the Hot R&B/Hip-Hop Songs chart. It has been certified double platinum by the Recording Industry Association of America (RIAA). The song topped the chart in France for five consecutive weeks and reached the top three in Belgium and the Netherlands. Anthony Mandler directed its music video, in which Rihanna's character shoots a man after he rapes her. The video was criticized by the Parents Television Council, Industry Ears and Mothers Against Violence, who faulted Rihanna for suggesting that murder is an acceptable form of justice for rape victims. However, actress Gabrielle Union, a rape survivor, praised the video for being relatable. "Man Down" was on the set list for three of Rihanna's tours – the Loud Tour (2011), the Diamonds World Tour (2013) and the Anti World Tour (2016).

== Background ==
In March 2010, record label Def Jam held a writing camp in Los Angeles for songwriters and producers to compose material for possible inclusion on Rihanna's then-untitled fifth studio album, Loud. Def Jam rented out nearly every recording studio in Los Angeles in order to create as many songs as possible. Ray Daniels, the manager of musical duo Rock City (brothers Theron and Timothy Thomas), was present during the sessions, and stated that a writing camp typically involves the label hiring ten recording studios for two weeks at the cost of $25,000 per day. Daniels revealed that it is where songwriters have lyrics but no music, and where producers have music but no lyrics.

Shama Joseph, professionally known as SAK PASE, was hired as one of the producers to work on crafting songs at the camp. SAK PASE's manager had arranged his attendance at the camp through an acquaintance who was an employee of the record label. SAK PASE explained that he found a flight to Los Angeles and began working on music as soon as he arrived, stating that he had "nothing to lose and everything to gain". He was inspired by a vision of Rihanna performing songs at a concert that were Caribbean themed. SAK PASE felt that Rihanna had not explored Caribbean-themed music since her debut album, Music of the Sun (2005).

== Production and recording ==
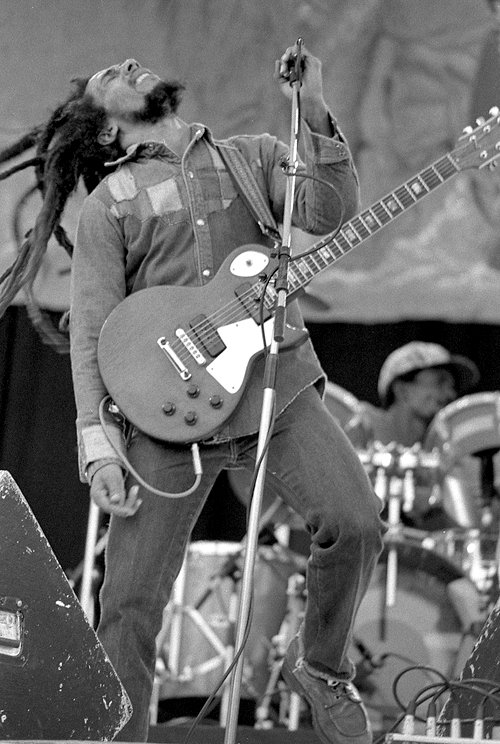
Rock City wanted to recreate Bob Marley's (pictured) 1973 song "I Shot the Sheriff" from a female perspective.

According to Daniels, Rock City knew Sak Pase but they had not heard the West Indian/Caribbean-themed music that he had composed during the camp. SAK PASE played the music to them, to which the brothers responded "Let's give Rihanna a one-drop! Like, a response to 'I Shot the Sheriff'!" Together, Sak Pase and Rock City wrote the lyrics to "Man Down" in twelve minutes. In an MTV News interview, Rock City said they intended to write a song that would embody Bob Marley's "I Shot the Sheriff" (1973) from a female perspective and to "tap [Rihanna's] island origins in a way that sounded authentic". Singer Shontelle said that Rihanna called her during the Last Girl on Earth tour and asked her to be involved with the song. She confirmed that Rihanna was present when she was writing her part in the recording studio. Shontelle elucidated that following one of Rihanna's concerts, the singer exited the stage and immediately returned to the tour bus to work in the studio. Daniels said that once the writing camp had concluded, Rihanna listened to all of the songs which had been composed for her and chose her favorites. In September 2010, several months after Sham attended the writing camp, Rihanna called him and said that she wanted to record "Man Down" for inclusion on Loud.

Rihanna later described the sentiment she wanted to express as "gangsta", and elaborated on how reggae culture has influenced her musical style: "I'm super inspired by reggae music [and it] has been a part of me since I was born, and I grew up listening to it. It was exciting for me to take this on as my own and do a song like this, especially with the lyrics being like that." The track was composed during Rihanna's Last Girl on Earth tour. The song's instrumental was recorded by Cary Clark at The Village in Los Angeles. Kuk Harrell produced Rihanna's vocals with Josh Gudwin and Marcos Tovar at Westlake Recording Studios, also in Los Angeles. Bobby Campbell assisted with vocal production and recording. The song was mixed by Manny Marroquin at Larrabee Sound Studios in Los Angeles, assisted by Erik Madrid and Christian Plata.

Daniels estimated the total cost of the writing camp to be approximately $200,000, averaging $18,000 for each of the eleven songs which were included on Loud; the camp consisted of forty writers and producers. Daniels confirmed that Rock City received $15,000 and Sham $20,000 for their part in the production of "Man Down". He said that "to get that twelve minutes of inspiration from a top songwriting team is expensive — even before you take into account the fee for the songwriters". A cost of $53,000 for "Man Down" was already incurred prior to Rihanna entering the studio with a vocal producer. Although Makeba Riddick did not serve as the song's vocal producer, Daniels cited her as an example of how the process works and how much she would charge. It is the responsibility of the vocal producer to tell a singer how to sing the song correctly to achieve the desired sound. Daniels said that Riddick's fee varies from $10,000 to $15,000, and that the final part of the process is for the song to be mixed and mastered, which incurs a similar fee. He estimated the final cost of writing, producing, vocal producing, mixing and mastering "Man Down" to be $78,000. When combined with the marketing and promotional costs, the total expense was $1,078,000.

== Composition and lyrical interpretation ==
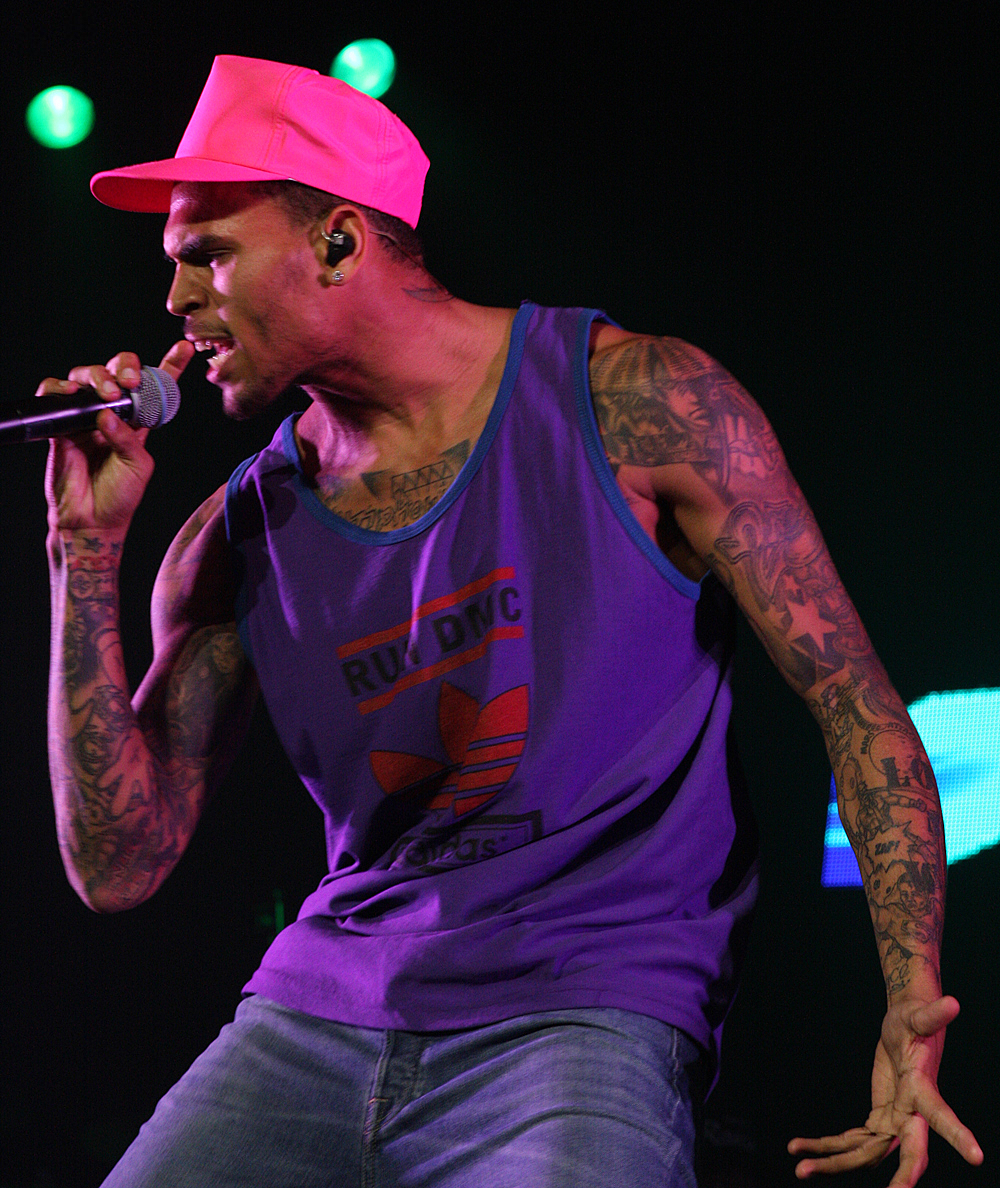
August Brown of Los Angeles Times saw "Man Down" as a warning to Rihanna's ex-boyfriend Chris Brown (pictured).

"Man Down" is a reggae and dancehall murder ballad with "Caribbean-rhythms" and elements of ragga and electronic music. The song, in the key of C minor, has a tempo of 77 beats per minute. Rihanna's voice spans more than one and a half octaves, from F_{3} to E♭_{5}. Slant Magazine critic Sal Cinquemani described "Man Down" as one of Rihanna's "most confident vocal performances" with her strong Barbadian patois. Jon Pareles of The New York Times said that the singer "plays up her West Indian accent", and August Brown of the Los Angeles Times described the vocals as reasserting "her Caribbean lilt". Entertainment Weekly writer Leah Greenblatt described "Man Down" as a song with "island rhythms". Lyrically, Rihanna is a fugitive after she shoots a man, but later regrets it. Rihanna slowly relays the chain of events which led up to the murder. She cries to her mother about the act that she has committed – "Mama, I just shot a man down" – expressing guilt and remorse for not meaning to kill her attacker, and that he is somebody's son. As the track develops, Rihanna's Bajan accent becomes stronger and exaggerated, which climaxes during the bridge as she declares "Why deed I pull dee treeguh, pull dee treeguh, pull dee treeguh, BOOM!" MuuMuse writer Bradley Stern thought that the track took on a confessional tone.

On February 8, 2009, Rihanna was reported to have been involved in an altercation with her boyfriend, Chris Brown. He allegedly punched Rihanna and threatened to kill her. Brown turned himself in to the police and pleaded guilty to misdemeanor assault during the trial. August Brown called the song an apparent "warning" to Chris Brown and a response to his song "Deuces" (2010), which denounces an ex-lover. Kitty Empire of The Guardian wrote that Brown's assault on Rihanna gives the song lyrical context, and that Rihanna sings the song with "bittersweet menace." When asked by HipHopDX about how he reacted to listeners of the song saying that it condones violence, Sham dismissed the accusations:

I didn’t think it made any sense. I think it was because of who it was saying 'I just shot a man down.' I think it was very hypocritical for some of the parents against violence in media, those same parents have probably allowed their kids to watch all types of movies and programs that have depictions, or things that insinuate violence. So for them to be mad about, number one, an issue that actually exists? ... A woman feeling like she wants to shoot somebody who’s still alive because of something that they took from her, that’s real and that’s honest. So the emotion is a very true emotion ... and they relive it on a daily basis. I think it was crazy and blown out of proportion .... But people benefit from controversy, and those same people who probably were trying to bring awareness, now they have a voice and now they’re 'specialists,' and they can speak for a group of people all of a sudden.

== Release and reception ==
On March 1, 2011, Rihanna asked fans to help her choose the next single from Loud using Twitter, saying that she would film a music video in the forthcoming weeks. After an influx of suggestions, the singer said she had narrowed the options down to four songs: "Man Down", "California King Bed", "Cheers (Drink to That)" and "Fading". On March 12, she confirmed that "California King Bed" had been selected as the next international single. However, "Man Down" was sent to rhythmic and urban radio stations in the United States on May 3, before the May 13 release of "California King Bed", making "Man Down" and "California King Bed" the fifth and sixth singles from Loud. The song was released in France and Switzerland on July 11 and the Netherlands on July 15.

Kitty Empire called the track "excellent", and praised it for being an original composition which is reminiscent of a "righteous old reggae murder ballad". Consequence of Sound writer Ryan Burleson said that "Man Down" and another album track called "Fading" both "stand on their own sonically", and that the former is an homage to her Caribbean heritage with its dancehall melody. Describing the track as "breezy", Bradley Stern thought that no other song on Loud embodied Rihanna's personality more so than on "Man Down". Cinquemani chose "Man Down" as the best song on Loud, calling Rihanna's vocal agility "surprising" and noting that the "fully-fledged reggae" song is co-written by a fellow Barbadian-born singer, Shontelle.

In her review of Loud, Emily Mackay of NME called its experimentation more "organic" than that on Rihanna's previous album Rated R (2009), citing "Man Down"'s theme of "doomed youth". Similarly, Nima Baniamer of Contactmusic.com pointed out that "Man Down", which she described as "a dark track" that is "haunting" yet "delightfully intriguing", was reminiscent of the material on Rated R. In their review of Rihanna's top 20 songs, Time Out ranked "Man Down" as their tenth best track, writing that it is Rihanna at "her badass best". Complex staff compiled a list of their top 26 Rihanna songs, and ranked "Man Down" in thirteenth place; Claire Lobenfeld thought that it was the singer's most "cinematic" song of her career, and that she elevated the theme of "accidental manslaughter" from "downtrodden" to "adorable".

== Commercial performance ==
In the United States, "Man Down" debuted on the Billboard Hot 100 in the week of June 11, 2011, peaking at number 59 on July 9 and spending a total of 14 weeks on the chart. On the Hot R&B/Hip-Hop Songs chart, it peaked at number nine on August 6, 2011, remaining there for two weeks and spending a total of 28 weeks charting. It was number 47 on the Hot R&B/Hip-Hop Songs 2011 year-end list. "Man Down" was certified double platinum by the Recording Industry Association of America (RIAA), denoting shipments of more than 2 million units. The song reached number 63 on the Canadian Hot 100.

"Man Down" debuted at number 65 on the French Singles Chart on June 6, 2011, a month before its release as a single. It rose to number one on July 30, remaining there for five consecutive weeks, and was number two the week before and for three weeks after its chart-topping run. It stayed on the chart until January 21, 2012, but re-entered four weeks later, before again leaving after the week of May 12, 2012 and re-entering three weeks later. The song, on and off the French chart for the rest the year, continued to appear on it sporadically in 2013. After a total of 73 weeks on the chart, the track's last French chart appearance was at number 172 on August 8, 2013.

"Man Down" entered the UK Singles Chart at number 117 on June 11, 2011, reaching number 75 the following week. The song peaked at number 54 in its fourth week, remaining there for two weeks and spending a total of 11 weeks on the chart. On the UK Hip Hop and R&B Singles Chart, "Man Down" reached number 15 on June 26, spending 18 weeks in the top 40. In Belgium, the song peaked at number three in Dutch-speaking Flanders and number two in French-speaking Wallonia. It was certified gold by the Belgian Entertainment Association (BEA) for selling more than 15,000 copies. Although the song spent only one week on the Italian Singles Chart (at number eight), it was certified platinum by the Federazione Industria Musicale Italiana (FIMI) in 2014 for selling more than 30,000 copies.

== Music video ==
=== Background and synopsis ===
Anthony Mandler directed the music video for "Man Down" in April 2011 on a beach in Portland Parish, on the northeastern Jamaican coast. Rihanna told Rap-Up that the video has a "strong underlying message [for] girls like me!" On May 1, 2011, three camera phone teaser photos, of Rihanna on a beach in a white Dolce & Gabbana dress and riding a bicycle in Portland Parish, were released. The music video premiered on BET's 106 & Park on May 31, 2011. In an interview for MTV News, Mandler said that "Man Down" required "a strong narrative and visual" and that fans could expect something "dramatic and shocking and intense and emotions and uplifting and enlightening".

The video opens as the protagonist (Rihanna) shoots and kills a man while he walks through a busy train station. She flees before a flashback to the previous day, when she rides her bike, meets friends and is alone in a bedroom at dusk. At a nightclub the protagonist dances and flirts with another club-goer, who then attacks her when she leaves the club. Disheveled, the woman cries in the street after an implied sexual assault, and the video ends as she runs home to grab a gun hidden in a dresser drawer. In September 2025, the video reached 1 billion views on YouTube.

=== Analysis and reception ===
Janell Hobson analysed the imagery presented in the video for "Man Down" in her book Body as Evidence: Mediating Race, Globalizing Gender, which "challenges postmodernist dismissals of identity politics and the delusional belief that the Millennial era reflects a 'postracial' and 'postfeminist' world." In the chapter titled "Disclosures: Black Women's Resistance to Sexual Violence", Hobson explores how black women have "found the courage" to speak out about sexual violence, protest against it and not remain a silent victim. She recalled Rihanna's interview for 20/20 with Diane Sawyer, which aired on November 6, 2009. Having remained silent about her altercation with Brown on the evening of the Grammy Party in February that year, whereby Brown assaulted her, Rihanna decided to speak about it for the first time. The author noted how Sawyer decided to approach the interview by presenting the couples relationship and assault case as an "anomaly" and accused Rihanna of "projecting a 'fake' imagery of strong black woman", rather than presenting her another domestic violence victim not only in the United States, but in the world. "I am strong", Rihanna responded. Hobson wrote that from then on, the singer decided to project an image of "hardcore masculinity and dominatrix-type femininity in her music trajectory".

Subsequently, several of Rihanna's songs and music videos have courted controversy for their violent themes, which Hobson attributes to the leaking of a photo showing the singers "battered face" on the evening of the assault by TMZ which circulated the internet without the permission of Rihanna. Hobson writes: "Because of this, Rihanna has had to wrest back control of the 'victim' image foisted on her, and she in turn has challenged us rhetorically and visually to question and examine the power, danger, and violences that shape our relationships." She continued to highlight the music videos for "Russian Roulette", "Hard", "We Found Love", "Love the Way You Lie" with Eminem which documents domestic violence, and "S&M", which contains references to bondage and fetishism and is, in part, Rihanna's response to disparaging critics, as examples. At one point in the video for "S&M", Rihanna is literally tied up as a victim.

However, Hobson noted that Rihanna "rejects the victim stance" in the video for "Man Down", and elucidated that she played the role of a rape survivor who shot her attacker. She attributed the location of shooting the video in Jamaica as significant, due to how the image of a gun proliferated during 1990s Jamaican dance hall's to "express female rage". The prologue depicts Rihanna as a "dark-hooded" femme fatale whereby the narrative explains her motives for murder and provokes the spectator to sympathize with her because she danced in a provocative manner with a man in a club, which Hobson suggests is "somehow deserving of rape". She continued to explain that Rihanna is inviting the audience to consider what justice means by "pointing both a literal and lyrical gun at the issue". Hobson concluded that Rihanna is protecting her vulnerability and countering the image of the abused black woman who is looked at unsympathetically in society.

Beck Bain of Idolator described the video as "visually stunning", while Metro writer Lee Ann labelled it as "shocking". Co-writer of "Man Down" Theron Thomas felt that the video was very theatrical and that Rihanna played her role "perfectly". He continued to say that had the video been a lyric-by-lyric representation, the narrative would have been more "graphic".

=== Controversy ===
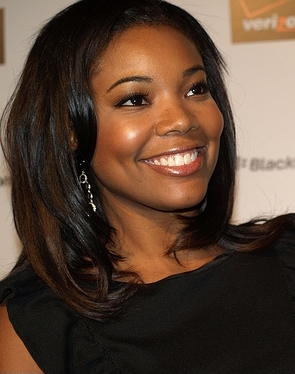
Actress Gabrielle Union (pictured), a rape victim, said that she could relate to the music video's storyline.

The Parents Television Council (PTC) criticized Rihanna for her portrayal of "cold, calculated execution of murder" in the music video, and argued that murdering a rapist as socially-acceptable justice is impermissible. The group disagreed with Rihanna's rationale for the storyline: that the video has "a very strong underlying message [for] girls" like Rihanna. According to the PTC and Industry Ears, if Chris Brown murdered a woman in a video that premiered on BET "the world would stop" and Rihanna should not have been allowed to release her clip. The week before the council's statement about the video it had objected to Rihanna and Britney Spears' performance of the "S&M" remix at the Billboard Music Awards, having called it a "profanity-laced, S&M sex show on prime-time broadcast television".

After the PTC's statement, Julianne Escobedo Shepherd of AlterNet wrote that the group seemed to employ a double standard; it had not condemned Kanye West's music video for "Monster", in which dead women hang from ceilings and West holds a severed head. Shepard added that Eminem and Rihanna's video for "Love the Way You Lie" had not been criticized, despite the fact that she felt that it "glorified and romanticized" domestic violence. A Mothers Against Violence spokesperson criticised Rihanna for failing to present a solution, rather than encouraging the vulnerable youth, for which rape is a reality for many people. Director Anthony Mandler addressed the controversy in an interview for The Hollywood Reporter, saying that the visual evoked the reaction he intended and that it highlighted an issue still taboo in modern society. He recalled growing up in an era in which artists such as Madonna released controversial music videos, and noted that contemporary videos no longer tackle taboo subjects as frequently.

Rihanna responded to the PTC's criticism on Twitter, and said that parents should not expect her to parent their children and that "touchy subject matters" should not be hidden from children because they will otherwise not learn how to adapt in society, and that it empowers abusers even more because children are embarrassed to talk about rape. The singer continued to state that "the industry isn't 'Parents R Us'" and that singers "have the freedom to create art". In an interview for BET, Rihanna further explained why rape was used as the vehicle to push the story forward in the video despite the lyrics not mentioning rape, saying "Making that into a mini-movie or video, we needed to go back to why it happened. Obviously she's not a cold-blooded killer. It had to be something so offensive. And we decided to hone in [sic] on a very serious matter that people are afraid to address, especially if you've been victimized in this scenario." Rihanna added that the character is remorseful for her actions.

Actress and women's-health advocate Gabrielle Union, a rape victim, voiced support for the video on Twitter. Union called it "brave" and, although she did not agree with the eye for an eye sentiment, she could relate to the situation. Union said that every rape victim or survivor is a unique situation, and that they all have an idea of how justice should be served. She admitted that she tried to shoot her rapist, but missed, and that she has since realised that committing murder as a form of justice for herself would not have made the situation better. She continued to say that while it is "understandable" to desire to kill a rapist, unless it is in self-defense then it is not advisable.

== Live performances and covers ==
Rihanna has included "Man Down" on the set lists of several concerts and tours, including the 2011 Loud Tour, BBC Radio 1's Hackney Weekend on May 24, 2012 and the 2013 Diamonds World Tour. For the Loud Tour, Rihanna performed the song on "a levitating, rotating platform, a conveyer belt and graffiti-laden car shell." Although Kitty Empire described "Man Down" as "terrific", the critic felt let down by the "baffling lack of creativity" from Rihanna's production team for the stage set up during Rihanna's performance. She wrote that she did not understand why a truck bonnet was in the middle of the stage. Maza praised the tracks placement on the set-list. "Man Down" was performed as the fourth song on the Loud Tour, following its opener "Only Girl (In the World)", "Disturbia" and "Shut Up and Drive". Maza noted that the tempo of "Man Down" should have "slowed down the momentum she'd accumulated until then but that was instead an ideal marriage of production and performance." Instead, the red lights on the stage played up the "ominous" tone of the song as it gradually increased its tempo to the point whereby the end of the song was on the verge of sounding like an incantation.

For the Diamonds World Tour, Rihanna performed "Man Down" in a Caribbean-theme section of the show, which also included "You da One", "No Love Allowed", "What's My Name?" and "Rude Boy". James Lachno of The Telegraph highlight the Caribbean-themed section as the show's highlight. Manchester Evening News writer Katie Fitzpatrick commented that Rihanna transported the audience to the Caribbean with a "grinding groove". However, Gary Graff of The Oakland Press was disappointed with the lack of variety in the section, writing that it was "addled by a sonic sameness, even with Nuno Bettencourt of Extreme, whose guitar was buried in the bass-heavy mix, playing some intriguing licks and accents".

British singer and songwriter Leona Lewis performed a mashup of "Man Down" with her 2008 single "Better in Time" at BBC Radio 1's Live Lounge in June 2011. She also included the mashup on the set list of her 2013 Glassheart Tour. Her rendition received a mixed response from critics. Katherine Hollisey-McLean of the Worthing Herald complimented the fusion of "Better in Time" with reggae beats, while The Guardian's Malcolm Jack thought the performance was "cringey" and called Lewis a "reasonably priced Rihanna".

== Charts ==
=== Weekly charts ===
Weekly chart performance
Chart (2011)	Peak position
Belgium (Ultratop 50 Flanders)	3
Belgium (Ultratop 50 Wallonia)	2
Canada Hot 100 (Billboard)	63
Czech Republic Airplay (ČNS IFPI)	19
France (SNEP)	1
Hungary (Rádiós Top 40)	11
Italy (FIMI)	8
Lebanon Airplay (Lebanese Top 20)	18
Luxembourg Digital Songs (Billboard)	10
Netherlands (Dutch Top 40)	3
Netherlands (Single Top 100)	4
Norway (VG-lista)	17
Poland Airplay (ZPAV)	4
Portugal Digital Songs (Billboard)	3
Romania Airplay (Media Forest)	2
Slovakia Airplay (ČNS IFPI)	37
Sweden (Sverigetopplistan)	31
Switzerland (Schweizer Hitparade)	9
Switzerland (Media Control Romandy)	1
UK Singles (Official Charts)	54
UK Hip Hop/R&B (Official Charts)	15
US Billboard Hot 100	59
US Hot R&B/Hip-Hop Songs (Billboard)	9
US Rhythmic Airplay (Billboard)	18

=== Year-end charts ===
2011 year-end chart performance
Chart (2011)	Position
Belgium (Ultratop 50 Flanders)	26
Belgium (Ultratop 50 Wallonia)	33
France (SNEP)	9
Hungary (Rádiós Top 40)	73
Italy (Musica e dischi)	73
Netherlands (Dutch Top 40)	16
Netherlands (Single Top 100)	24
Sweden (Sverigetopplistan)	73
Switzerland (Schweizer Hitparade)	50
US Hot R&B/Hip-Hop Songs (Billboard)	47

2012 year-end chart performance
Chart (2012)	Position
France (SNEP)	175

== Certifications and sales ==
Certifications and sales
Region	Certification	Certified units/sales
Australia (ARIA)	Platinum	70,000^{‡}
Belgium (BRMA)	Gold	15,000^{*}
Brazil (Pro-Música Brasil)	Diamond	250,000^{‡}
Denmark (IFPI Danmark)	Platinum	90,000^{‡}
France	—	190,000
Italy (FIMI)	Platinum	30,000^{*}
New Zealand (RMNZ)	Platinum	30,000^{‡}
Sweden (GLF)	2× Platinum	80,000^{‡}
Switzerland (IFPI Switzerland)	Gold	15,000^{^}
United Kingdom (BPI)	Platinum	600,000^{‡}
United States (RIAA)	2× Platinum	2,000,000^{‡}
^{*} Sales figures based on certification alone.^{^} Shipments figures based on certification alone.^{‡} Sales+streaming figures based on certification alone.

== Release history ==
Release dates and formats
Region	Date	Format(s)	Label	Ref.
United States	May 3, 2011	Rhythmic contemporary radio; urban contemporary radio	Island Def Jam	
France	July 11, 2011	Digital download	Universal	
Netherlands	July 11, 2011	Digital download	Universal	
Switzerland	July 15, 2011	Digital download	Universal	
Italy	August 5, 2011	Radio airplay	Universal	

== See also ==
- List of number-one singles of 2011 (France)
