= Fading (song) =

Song by Rihanna

from the album Loud
- Released: November 12, 2010
- Recorded: 2010
- Studio: The Bunker Studios (Paris, France)
- Genre: Pop; R&B
- Length: 3:27
- Label: Def Jam; SRP
- Songwriters: Darnell Dalton; Jamal Jones; Lamar Taylor; Quinton Amey; William Hodge
- Producers: Polow da Don; Willy Will; Kuk Harrell; Veronika Bozeman

"Fading" is a song by Barbadian recording artist Rihanna from her fifth studio album, Loud (2010). The song was written by Darnell Dalton, Jamal Jones, Lamar Taylor, Quinton Amey and William Hodge, with production by Kuk Harrell, Willy Will, Veronika Bozeman and Jones under his production moniker Polow da Don. Originally, the song sampled Irish instrumentalist and singer-songwriter Enya's "One by One", though this was later removed post-album release. Lyrically, the song is about leaving a man in a relationship. After Loud had strong digital download sales in the United Kingdom, "Fading" charted at number 187 on that country's singles chart in November 2010. The song received generally positive reviews from music critics, who praised da Don's production, but one critic criticized Rihanna for copying herself and failing to create something different. Some critics also compared it to one of Rihanna's previous singles, "Take a Bow". The song has also been performed on select dates of the Loud Tour (2011).

== Background and composition ==
Recording sessions for Loud began in February 2010, and continued for six months, overlapping with Rihanna's Last Girl on Earth Tour and during the production of her debut feature film, Battleship. At the beginning of March 2011, Rihanna asked fans to help her select her next single, following the release of "S&M". Via Twitter, fans were asked to choose from "Cheers (Drink to That)", "Man Down", "California King Bed" or "Fading". The most popular choice would have its video filmed at the end of March 2011. On March 12, 2011, it was confirmed that fans had selected "California King Bed" as the next single to be released from the album in the United States. In August 2011, a new version of "Fading" was unveiled sans the Enya sample. The original version, however, is still playable on the album's Japan edition in some music streaming services including Last.fm and Spotify.

"Fading" was written by Darnell Dalton, Jamal Jones, Lamar Taylor, Quinton Amey and William Hodge, with production by Kuk Harrell, Willy Will, Veronika Bozeman and Jones under his production moniker Polow da Don. The song was recorded by Sandy Vee at The Bunker Studio's in Paris, France in 2010. Musically, the song features a piano and violin led instrumental whilst lyrically, "Fading" is about the female protagonist leaving her boyfriend because she feels that they have become distant and their relationship has faded. The lyrics of the song feature Rihanna adopting a vocal diction which urges her boyfriend to leave and walk away from the relationship, "Go on, be gone/ Bye bye so long/ Can't you see we're fading away". As noted by Emily Mackay of NME, the song is reminiscent of one of the singer's previous songs about a relationship gone awry, "Take a Bow", in lyrical content and musicality.

== Critical reception ==
Upon Loud's release, multiple music critics wrote about "Fading" as part of their review, many of whom praised the production of the song. Emily Mackay of NME wrote about the song as part of an overall review of the album, writing "A weird baroque pop opening, violin stabs and treated vocals, builds slowly into a rolling and shuddering beat and soft, sad-toned piano. Mesfin Fekadu of The Boston Globe called the track "exceptional" and compared the lyrical content to that of one of Rihanna's previous singles "Take A Bow", writing that Rihanna is skilled at putting out songs about being the woman in a relationship who leaves the man, as she does in "Fading". Jon Pareles of The New York Times praised Polow da Don's production of the song, writing "'Fading' strategizes with long and short elements—sustained choruses and staccato verses, edgeless keyboard chords, and notes that are suddenly truncated—to capture the ambivalence of a failing romance." Melissa Maerz of Rolling Stone commented that the singer manages to remain "serene" on the song, even with the sampling of Enya's "One by One", and added that "maybe the good girl gone bad is getting better?", in reference to Rihanna's third studio album title, Good Girl Gone Bad (2007).

Leah Greenblatt of Entertainment Weekly simply wrote of "Fading" that the song, a "walk away ballad", is a "gorgeously synthesized moment of sweet defiance". David Driver of Sputnikmusic wrote that "Fading", along with "California King Bed", are both "well-done, soulful ballads" and that they are "completely free" of the sulky tones which could be found on some compositions on Rihanna's previous album, Rated R (2009). Colin Gentry of 4Music also noted in his review that the song communicates a passionate expression of grief to the listener. Ryan Burleson of Consequence of Sound wrote that the song was one of the best on the album, commenting that it stands out "sonically". Burleson added that it is "a hopeful, piano and string-based R&B" song, and compared to the work of late 1990s artists such as Aaliyah and Faith Evans. Ryan Dombell of Pitchfork Media criticized "Fading" as well as Rihanna herself, for copying "[her] own lightweight R&B formula so much it's redundant".

== Chart performance ==
Upon the release of Loud, "Fading" charted in three territories. The song debuted at number 37 on the South Korea Gaon International Chart for the issue dated November 14, 2010. The following week, it fell to number 79. "Fading" charted at number 187 on the UK Singles Chart for the issue dated November 27, 2010. The song was more successful on the UK R&B Chart, where it peaked at number 34 in the same chart issue. In the United States, "Fading" peaked at number 42 on the R&B/Hip-hop Digital Songs chart on December 3, 2010.

== Live performances ==
Though the song has never been performed live as part of a televised performance, the song was featured on the set list of select dates of the Loud Tour. Rihanna performed the song on June 6 and 7, 2011, at the Air Canada Centre in Toronto, Ontario, Canada, where the song was featured near the end of the set. As noted by Jane Stevenson of the Toronto Sun, after performing a selection of ballads from the singer's repertoire, including "Unfaithful", "Hate That I Love You" and "California King Bed", Rihanna re-appeared on stage wearing a rainbow colored feathered coat, denim bra and short shorts to perform "What's My Name?", "Rude Boy", "Fading", "Don't Stop the Music" and "Take a Bow".

== Credits and personnel ==
Credits and personnel adapted from the liner notes of Loud.

Locations

- Recorded at No Excuses Recording Studios, Santa Monica, California; The Bunker Studios, Paris, France
- Mixed at Ninja Club Studios, Atlanta, Georgia.

Personnel

- Rihanna – vocals
- Ester Dean – background vocals
- Quintin Amey, Alex Gazaway – songwriting
- Polow da Don– production
- Kuk Harrell, Josh Gudwin and Marcus Tovar – vocal recording
- Kuk Harrell – vocal production
- Veronika Bozeman – additional vocal production
- Damien Lewis – additional/assistant engineering
- Phil Tan at The Ninja Beat Club, Atlanta, GA – mixing
- Sandy Vee at The Bunker Studios, Paris – recording

== Charts ==
Chart (2010)	Peak position
South Korea International (Gaon)	37
UK Singles (OCC)	187
UK R&B (OCC)	34
US R&B/Hip-Hop Digital Songs (Billboard)	42
