= Loud Tour =

2011 concert tour by Rihanna

- Tour by Rihanna
- Promotional poster for the tour
- Associated album: Loud
- Start date: June 4, 2011
- End date: December 22, 2011
- Legs: 4
- No. of shows: 98
- Box office: $90 million ($128.81 million in 2025 dollars)

Rihanna concert chronology
- Last Girl on Earth Tour (2010–11); Loud Tour (2011); Diamonds World Tour (2013)

The Loud Tour was the fourth overall and third world concert tour by Barbadian singer Rihanna. Performing in over twenty countries in the Americas and Europe, the tour was launched in support of Rihanna's fifth studio album Loud (2010). Critics acclaimed the show for its liveliness and higher caliber of quality when compared to Rihanna's previous tours. The Loud Tour was a large commercial success, experiencing demand for an extension of shows in the United Kingdom due to popularity. In London, Rihanna played a record-breaking 10 dates at The O2 Arena. The tour ultimately grossed an estimated value of US$90 million from 98 reported shows and a total audience of 1,200,800. The Loud Tour became the seventh-highest-grossing tour of 2011.

== Background ==
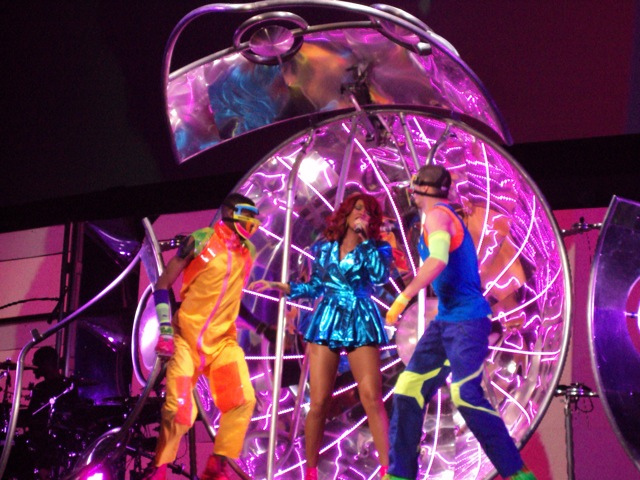
Rihanna performing "Only Girl (In the World)" in Oakland

The tour was officially announced on February 9, 2011, during her Last Girl On Earth Tour (2010–11), when North American dates were revealed. The tour was described as an "all new production, costumes and stage design creating a visual and audio event with the once in a lifetime excitement her fans around the world have come to expect from one of the brightest stars in music today." Speaking about the tour, Rihanna stated that "We're creating an incredible ride with this tour. I'm excited to get out on the road and share my new music from this album. We are going to have an amazing time and I know my fans are ready to get LOUD!" During an interview with Ryan Seacrest after she performed "California King Bed" on American Idol April 14, 2011, the singer spoke about the tour's development. Rihanna addressed rumors about a special performance to be included on the setlist in order to fully incorporate her fans into the experience, saying: When asked by Seacrest about the fan experience, she joked ""You always know the inside scoop!" before continuing to say "Right now, we just designed the stage. I'm really not supposed to say this, but I want to get you excited... We're building two sections on the stage [for the fans. They'll be] closer than they've ever been. It's real VIP."

CeeLo Green was confirmed to be the support act for the North American leg of the tour in February 2011. Rihanna spoke about Green joining her on tour in a press statement, saying "I'm a huge fan of Cee Lo since his days with Goodie Mob and with Gnarls Barkley. He's a musical genius, continually reinventing himself, and I'm thrilled to have him join me on tour." However, he decided to pull out of performing on the tour, and cited schedule conflicts for his reason. For his replacement, J. Cole, B.o.B. and DJ Dummy were enlisted to be support acts for the North American leg. For the European leg of the tour, DJ Calvin Harris served as the support act.

=== Show incidents ===
After a late start to her July 8, 2011, Dallas show, a fire broke out following Rihanna's performance of "California King Bed." For safety reasons, the audience was evacuated and the concert was forced to end early. The show wasn't rescheduled.

== Concert synopsis ==
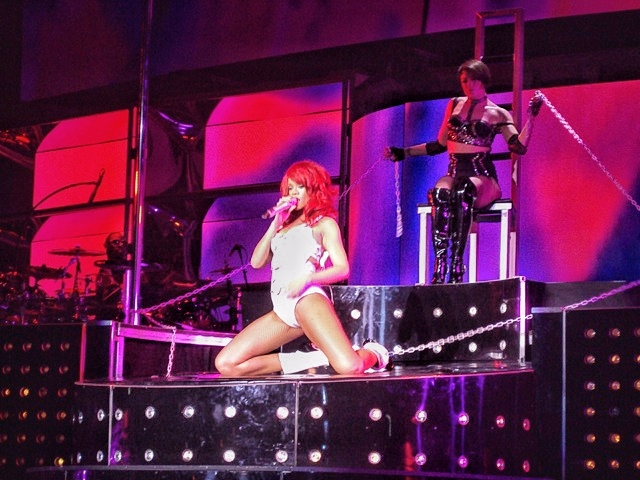
Rihanna performing "S&M" in Oakland

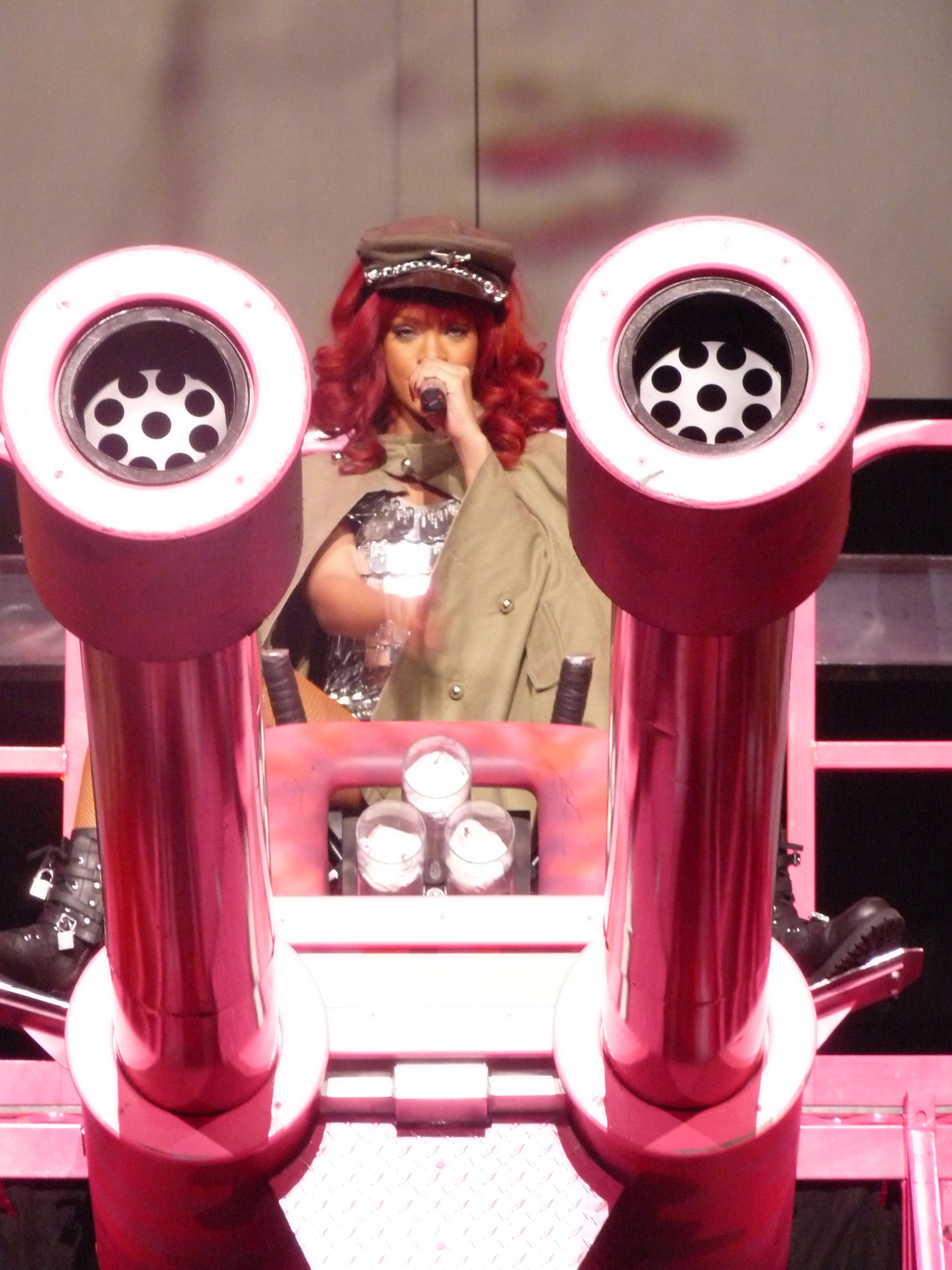
Rihanna performing "Hard" in Sunrise, Florida

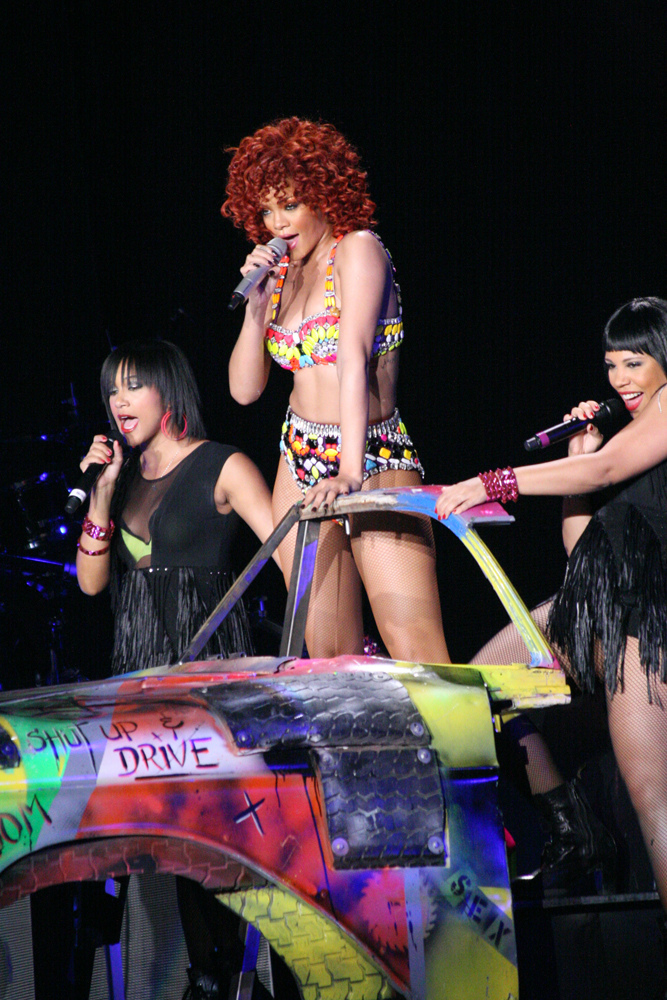
Rihanna performing "Shut Up and Drive" in Minneapolis

The show began with a short video introduction featuring Rihanna sitting on a throne wearing a black coat and a short red wig. The middle screen splits revealing Rihanna inside a purple ball wearing an electric blue dress. She begins singing "Only Girl (In the World)" surrounded by her dancers all wearing bright neon costumes. The next song, "Disturbia", follows with Rihanna taking off the blue dress and dancing around in a colorful daisy duke, leading into "Shut Up and Drive" where a car covered in graffiti is present in the middle of the stage. The first segment ends with "Man Down" where Rihanna gets inside the car and descends beneath the stage. The first video interlude titled "Le Sex Shoppe" features Rihanna dressed in white dress and a suit smoking a cigar while the words "sex" and "temptation" are whispered throughout the video.

The second segment begins with a cover of Prince's "Darling Nikki" where Rihanna, dressed in a suit and holding a cane, rubs against her female dancers. The song moves into "S&M" where her female dancers remove her suit to reveal a tight black leotard and chain her to the stage. After a pillow fight with her male dancers, Rihanna then performs "Let Me", followed by "Skin" where Rihanna brings a fan onstage and gives him/her a lap dance as she descends back beneath the stage for a costume change. A brief guitar solo follows performed by Nuno Bettencourt. Rihanna returns to the stage atop a pink tank shooting puffs of smoke, with her and her dancers dressed in military gear, to perform "Raining Men". After climbing out the tank, Rihanna then performs "Hard" dancing around the stage while her dancers wield pink rifles. A mashup of "Breakin' Dishes" and Sheila E.'s "The Glamorous Life" is performed next, followed by another mashup of "Run This Town" and "Live Your Life" with Rihanna leaving the stage for another costume change.

The second video interlude features Rihanna wearing a red dress while waving sheets of chiffon in the air and ends with the spoken line: "I hate that I love you." Rihanna returns to the stage wearing a bright yellow dress in brown thigh high boots to perform "Unfaithful" on a platform behind purple neon bars. The song then moves into a solo version of "Hate That I Love You" with Rihanna sitting in a chair next to the guitarist. The segment ends with "California King Bed" with smoke covering the stage floor, followed by another guitar solo by Bettencourt. The third and final interlude features a remix of "Pon de Replay" with images from Rihanna's music videos. "What's My Name" opens the final section with Rihanna wearing a colorful sequined bra and jean shorts, dancing with her dancers.

The next song, "Rude Boy", features Rihanna surrounded by her male dancers with various television screens in the background. Rihanna then puts on a pair of sunglasses and chants with the audience for "Cheers (Drink to That)", followed by "Don't Stop the Music" with vigorous choreography. Rihanna then performs "Take a Bow" and says goodbye to the audience. The encore begins with "Love the Way You Lie (Part II)" which Rihanna performs on top of a piano, before moving into the final song, "Umbrella", with Rihanna in a gold outfit, dancing with her dancers, with confetti falling from the ceiling and golden rain drops falling in the backdrops. A performance of "We Found Love" was added to the setlist and closed the show starting on November 14.

== Reception ==
=== Critical ===
The tour has gained critical acclaim from music critics citing it as "Rihanna's best tour yet". Jane Stevenson of the Toronto Sun commented that "the two-hour, larger-than-life show lived up to the billing. And then some." Bernard Perusse of the Montreal Gazette stated that the tour was a visual spectacle saying, "Pods, dry ice, sparklers, plumes of smoke, a platform raising her from below stage and back down when needed, a moving section of the floor to convey her from one side of the stage to another, videos, writhing dancers, a cannon, arena-rock guitar solos, umpteen costume changes and maybe a record for the amount of times a performer has screamed 'Montreal!' in the centre. The fans ate it up." Jon Brean of the Minneapolis Star Tribune remarked, "The Barbadian singer is more visually and vocally dynamic than she has ever been before." Amanda Ash of the Vancouver Sun stated, "Rihanna knows how to throw a party -a sexy, steamy, tight and-bright bash where yesterday's troubles are crushed beneath mile-high stilettos and drowned by intoxicating club beats", and added, "Rihanna turned Rogers Arena into a giant dance club on Friday night."

Nation News Barbados commented, "The name of Rihanna's world tour adequately described the experience at the biggest show to come to Barbados to date. It took a long time in coming, but Rihanna's first major showing in her hometown was definitely well worth the wait. From the endless hits including 'S&M', 'Man Down', 'Hard', 'Pon De Replay' and 'Unfaithful'; the spectacular stage and props to her playing a solo piece on drums, the girl who grew up in nearby Westbury Road was awesome."

Irish Independent concluded that, "Strutting across the stage surrounded by backing dancers, the 23-year-old seemed at home singing in Ireland. 14,000, mostly female, fans enjoyed the set which kicked off at 9.15pm when the singer emerged to thunderous sound effects and a "blitzkreig" [sic] of video from a silver shell wearing a luminous blue jacket." Scottish tabloid Daily Record remarked, "R&B superstar Rihanna blew the roof off Glasgow's SECC last night with her aptly-titled Loud tour. Exploding on stage in a neon-tuned bubble, the Barbadian singer delivered an enthralling performance that never let up."

=== Commercial ===
The tour grossed $90 million overall, making it the 7th highest-grossing tour of 2011. Average ticket price of the ticket was $74.95, and the average tickets sold were 15,395. The total tickets sold were 1,200,800 and the average gross was $1,153,846 per show.

== Broadcasts and recordings ==
Rihanna's performance during Rock In Rio was broadcast live in Brazil on Multishow, Globo.com and Rede Globo, and aired internationally on YouTube. A clip of Rihanna performing "We Found Love" on tour was aired on the Grammy Nominations Concert.

== Opening acts ==
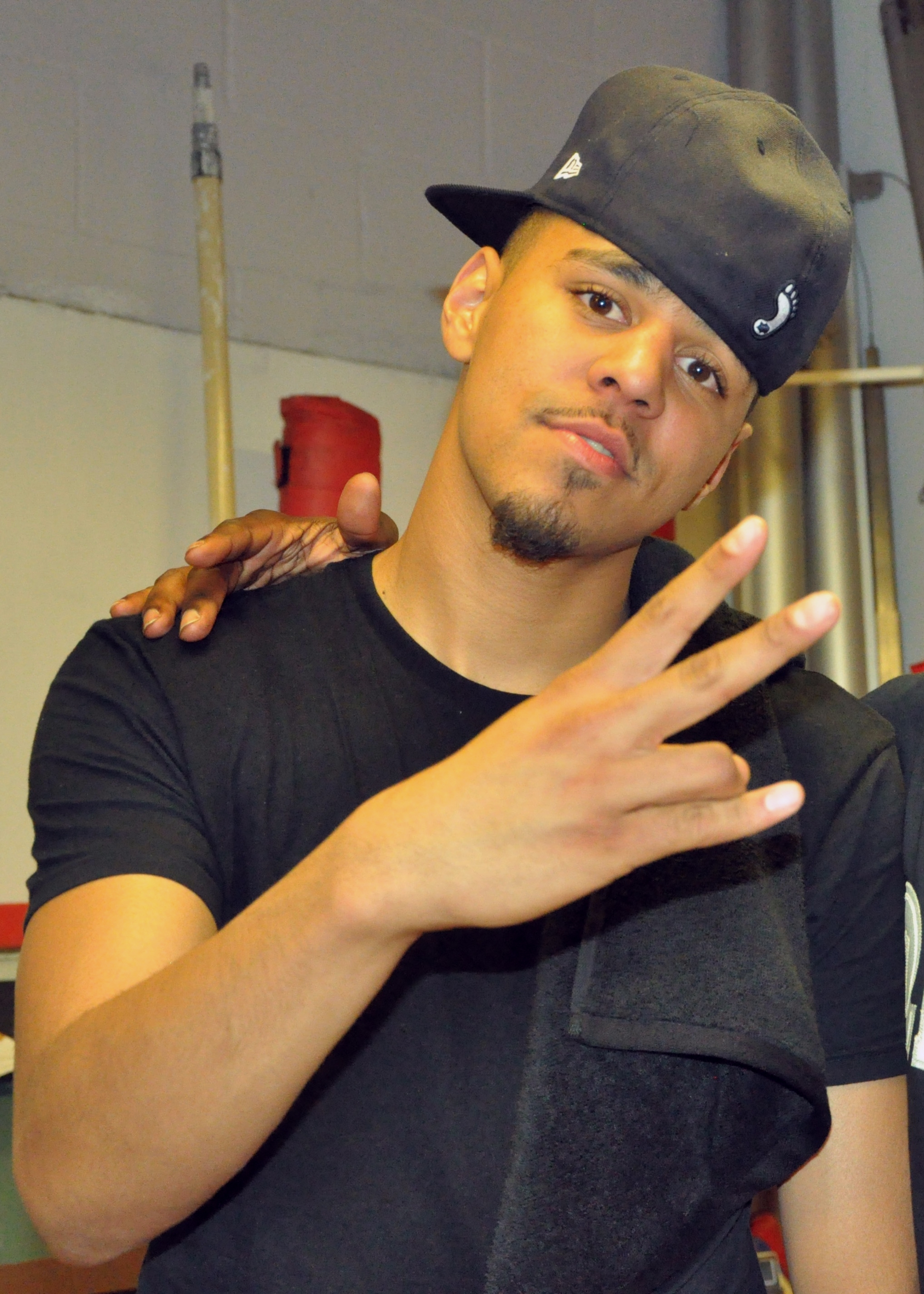
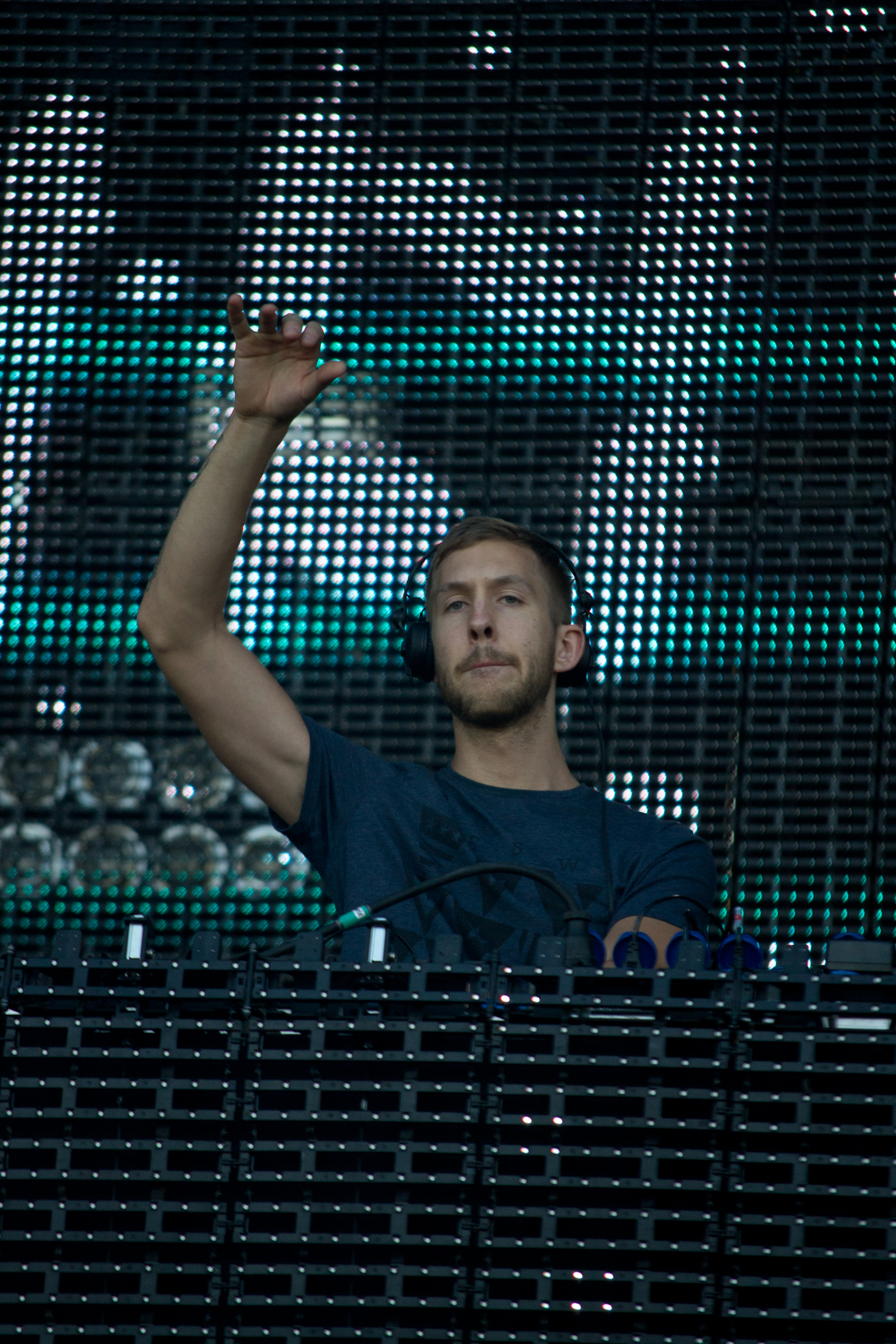
The lead opening act in North America was rapper J. Cole (left), in Europe it was DJ Calvin Harris (right).
- J. Cole (North America)
- B.o.B (North America) (selected dates)
- CeeLo Green (North America) (selected dates)
- DJ Dummy (North America) (selected dates)
- Calvin Harris (Europe) (selected dates)
- K.T (North America)
- Cover Drive (Barbados)

== Setlist ==
1. "Only Girl (In the World)"
2. "Disturbia"
3. "Shut Up and Drive"
4. "Man Down"
5. "Darling Nikki"
6. "S&M"
7. "Let Me"
8. "Skin"
9. "Raining Men"
10. "Hard"
11. "Breakin' Dishes" / "The Glamorous Life"
12. "Run This Town" / "Live Your Life"
13. "Unfaithful"
14. "Hate That I Love You"
15. "California King Bed"
16. "What's My Name?"
17. "Rude Boy"
18. "Cheers (Drink to That)"
19. "Don't Stop the Music"
20. "Take a Bow"

Encore

21. "Love the Way You Lie (Part II)"
22. "Umbrella"
23. "We Found Love" (November 13 - December 22)

=== Notes ===
- On select shows in North America, "Fading" replaced "Cheers (Drink to That)".
- During the second performances in Toronto and Montreal, Rihanna was joined by Drake during "What's My Name?".
- During the performance in Uniondale, Rihanna was joined onstage by Kanye West during "Run This Town" and "All of the Lights".
- During the performance in East Rutherford, Rihanna was joined onstage by Jay-Z during "Run This Town" and "Umbrella".
- During the performance in Birmingham, Rihanna performed a cover of Lynyrd Skynyrd's "Sweet Home Alabama".
- During the two performances in Bergen, Rihanna performed "Redemption Song" in a tribute to victims of the 2011 Norway attacks.
- In Chelmsford and Weston, "Darling Nikki", "Skin", "Hate That I Love You" and "California King Bed" were not performed.
- During the performance in Chelmsford, Rihanna performed "Cheers (Drink to That)"
- During the performance in Weston, Rihanna performed "Breakin Dishes".
- During the performance in Rio de Janeiro, “Darling Nikki”, "Let Me", “Skin”, "Breakin' Dishes", "The Glamorous Life" and "Hate That I Love You" were not performed.
- In South America, during the shows in Brasília and Rio de Janeiro, Rihanna performed "Te Amo".
- Starting on November 13, "We Found Love" closed the show.

== Tour dates ==
List of concerts
Date	City	Country	Venue
June 4, 2011	Baltimore	United States	1st Mariner Arena
June 6, 2011	Toronto	Canada	Air Canada Centre
June 7, 2011^{[A]}	Toronto	Canada	Air Canada Centre
June 8, 2011	Ottawa	Canada	Scotiabank Place
June 10, 2011	Montreal	Canada	Bell Centre
June 11, 2011^{[A]}	Montreal	Canada	Bell Centre
June 14, 2011	Auburn Hills	United States	The Palace of Auburn Hills
June 15, 2011	Chicago	United States	United Center
June 16, 2011	Minneapolis	United States	Target Center
June 18, 2011	Winnipeg	Canada	MTS Centre
June 19, 2011	Saskatoon	Canada	Credit Union Centre
June 21, 2011	Calgary	Canada	Scotiabank Saddledome
June 22, 2011	Edmonton	Canada	Rexall Place
June 24, 2011	Vancouver	Canada	Rogers Arena
June 25, 2011	Vancouver	Canada	Rogers Arena
June 28, 2011	Los Angeles	United States	Staples Center
June 29, 2011	Anaheim	United States	Honda Center
June 30, 2011	Oakland	United States	Oracle Arena
July 2, 2011	Las Vegas	United States	Mandalay Bay Events Center
July 4, 2011	Albuquerque	United States	The Pavilion
July 8, 2011^{[1]}	Dallas	United States	American Airlines Center
July 9, 2011	Houston	United States	Toyota Center
July 11, 2011	Birmingham	United States	BJCC Arena
July 12, 2011	Atlanta	United States	Chastain Park Amphitheatre
July 14, 2011	Sunrise	United States	BankAtlantic Center
July 16, 2011	Greensboro	United States	Greensboro Coliseum
July 17, 2011	Atlantic City	United States	Borgata Event Center
July 19, 2011^{[B]}	Uniondale	United States	Nassau Veterans Memorial Coliseum
July 21, 2011^{[C]}	East Rutherford	United States	Izod Center
July 22, 2011	Uncasville	United States	Mohegan Sun Arena
July 23, 2011	Philadelphia	United States	Wells Fargo Center
July 24, 2011	Boston	United States	TD Garden
August 5, 2011	Bridgetown	Barbados	Kensington Oval
August 15, 2011^{[2]}	Helsinki	Finland	Hietaranta Beach
August 17, 2011^{[2]}	Bergen	Norway	Koengen
August 18, 2011^{[3]}	Bergen	Norway	Koengen
August 20, 2011^{[4]}	Weston	England	Weston Park
August 21, 2011^{[4]}	Chelmsford	England	Hylands Park
September 17, 2011	São Paulo	Brazil	Arena Anhembi
September 18, 2011	Belo Horizonte	Brazil	Mineirinho Arena
September 21, 2011	Brasília	Brazil	Nilson Nelson Arena
September 23, 2011^{[5]}	Rio de Janeiro	Brazil	Parque dos Atletas
September 29, 2011	Belfast	Northern Ireland	Odyssey Arena
September 30, 2011	Belfast	Northern Ireland	Odyssey Arena
October 1, 2011	Belfast	Northern Ireland	Odyssey Arena
October 3, 2011	Dublin	Ireland	The O_{2}
October 5, 2011	London	England	The O_{2} Arena
October 6, 2011	London	England	The O_{2} Arena
October 7, 2011	Liverpool	England	Echo Arena
October 9, 2011	Manchester	England	Manchester Evening News Arena
October 10, 2011	Glasgow	Scotland	Scottish Exhibition Hall 4
October 11, 2011	Glasgow	Scotland	Scottish Exhibition Hall 4
October 13, 2011	London	England	The O_{2} Arena
October 15, 2011	Birmingham	England	LG Arena
October 16, 2011	Newcastle	England	Metro Radio Arena
October 19, 2011	Lyon	France	Halle Tony Garnier
October 20, 2011	Paris	France	Palais Omnisports de Paris-Bercy
October 21, 2011	Paris	France	Palais Omnisports de Paris-Bercy
October 22, 2011	Antwerp	Belgium	Sportpaleis
October 25, 2011	Munich	Germany	Olympiahalle
October 26, 2011	Frankfurt	Germany	Festhalle Frankfurt
October 28, 2011	Herning	Denmark	Jyske Bank Boxen
October 30, 2011	Oslo	Norway	Oslo Spektrum
November 1, 2011	Stockholm	Sweden	Ericsson Globe
November 4, 2011	Hanover	Germany	TUI Arena
November 5, 2011	Leipzig	Germany	Arena Leipzig
November 7, 2011	Zürich	Switzerland	Hallenstadion
November 8, 2011	Cologne	Germany	Lanxess Arena
November 9, 2011	Arnhem	Netherlands	GelreDome
November 11, 2011	Antwerp	Belgium	Sportpaleis
November 13, 2011	London	England	The O_{2} Arena
November 14, 2011	London	England	The O_{2} Arena
November 15, 2011	London	England	The O_{2} Arena
November 18, 2011	Birmingham	England	LG Arena
November 19, 2011	Sheffield	England	Motorpoint Arena
November 21, 2011	Manchester	England	Manchester Evening News Arena
November 22, 2011	Nottingham	England	National Ice Centre
November 23, 2011	Glasgow	Scotland	Scottish Exhibition and Conference Centre
November 25, 2011	Dublin	Ireland	The O_{2}
November 27, 2011	Newcastle	England	Metro Radio Arena
November 28, 2011	Manchester	England	Manchester Evening News Arena
November 29, 2011	Birmingham	England	National Indoor Arena
December 1, 2011	London	England	The O_{2} Arena
December 2, 2011	Manchester	England	Manchester Evening News Arena
December 3, 2011^{[6]}	London	England	The O_{2} Arena
December 4, 2011	Hamburg	Germany	O_{2} World Hamburg
December 6, 2011	Łódź	Poland	Atlas Arena
December 7, 2011	Prague	Czech Republic	O_{2} Arena Prague
December 8, 2011	Budapest	Hungary	Budapest Sports Arena
December 10, 2011	Zurich	Switzerland	Hallenstadion
December 11, 2011	Turin	Italy	Torino Palasport Olimpico
December 12, 2011	Milan	Italy	Mediolanum Forum
December 14, 2011	Barcelona	Spain	Palau Sant Jordi
December 15, 2011	Madrid	Spain	Palacio de Deportes
December 17, 2011	Lisbon	Portugal	Pavilhão Atlântico
December 20, 2011	London	England	The O_{2} Arena
December 21, 2011	London	England	The O_{2} Arena
December 22, 2011	London	England	The O_{2} Arena

Additional Notes

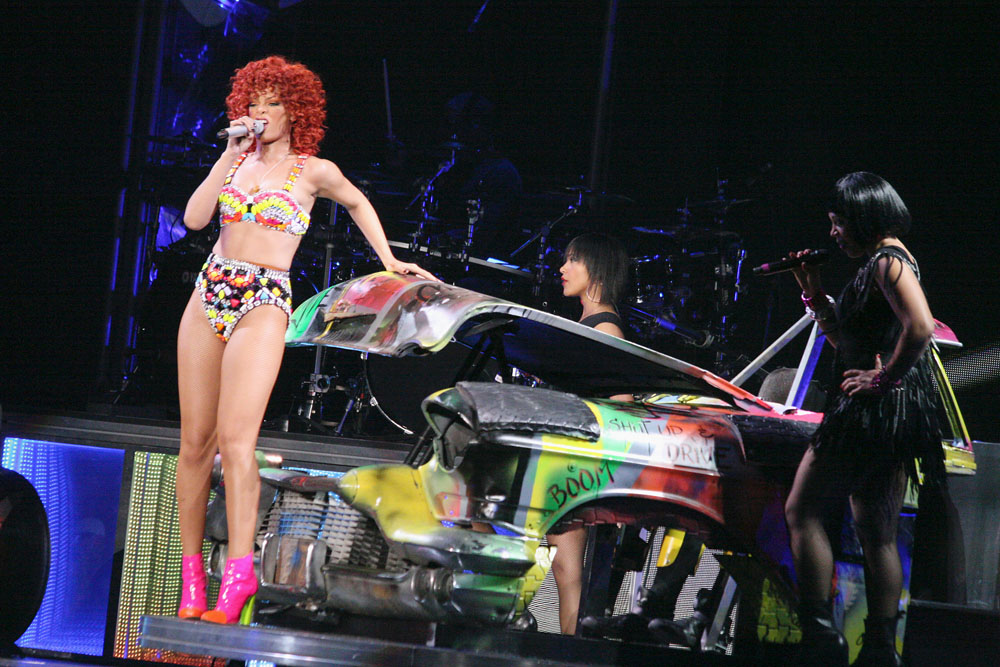
Rihanna performing "Shut Up And Drive" in Minneapolis

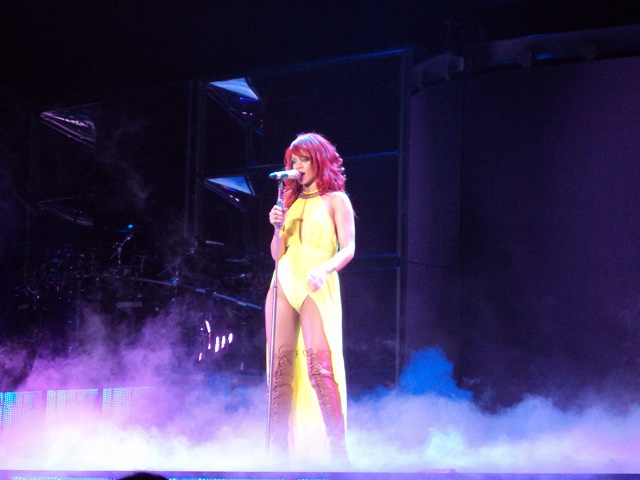
Rihanna performing "California King Bed" in Oakland

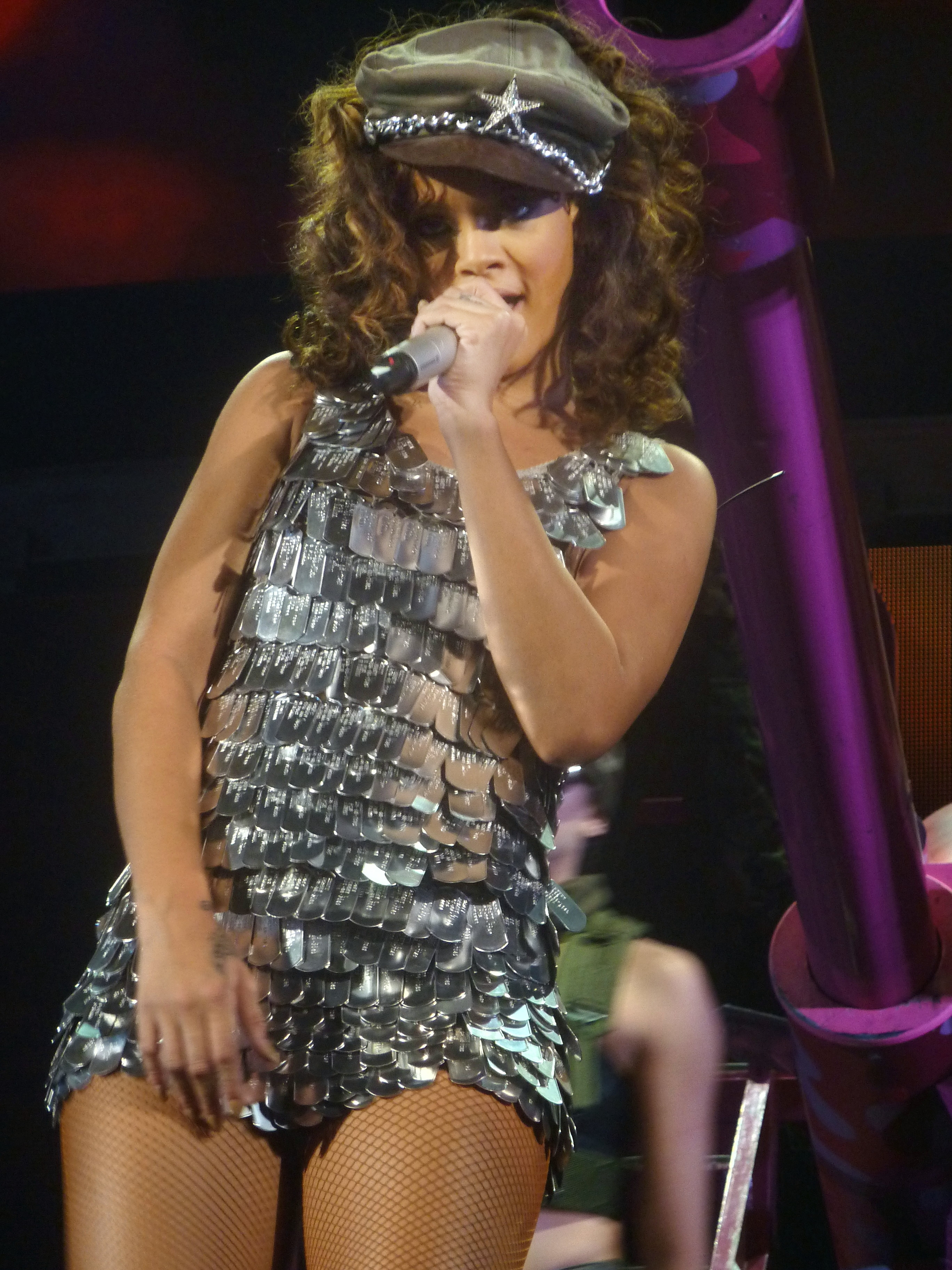
Rihanna performing "Breakin' Dishes" in Paris

- A During the second performances in Toronto and Montreal, Rihanna was joined by Drake during "What's My Name?".
- B During the performance in Uniondale, Rihanna was joined onstage by Kanye West during "Run This Town" and "All of the Lights".
- C During the performance in East Rutherford, Rihanna was joined onstage by Jay-Z during "Run This Town" and "Umbrella".

Music festivals and other miscellaneous performances

^{1} During the Dallas concert, while Rihanna was singing California King Bed, fireworks caused a fire, so the concert was ended
^{2} This concert is a part of On the Beach
^{3} These concerts are a part of Bergen Calling
^{4} These concerts are a part of V Festival
^{5} This concert is a part of Rock in Rio
^{6} This concert is a part of Jingle Bell Ball

== Cancellations and rescheduled shows ==
List of cancelled concerts, showing date, city, country, venue, and reason for cancellation
Date	City	Country	Venue	Reason
July 8, 2011	Dallas	United States	American Airlines Center	Fire breakout
October 31, 2011	Malmö	Sweden	Malmö Arena	Severe exhaustion
November 2, 2011	Stockholm	Sweden	Ericsson Globe	Unknown

== Box office score data ==
Venue	City	Tickets sold / available	Gross revenue
Air Canada Centre	Toronto	27,270 / 27,270 (100%)	$2,076,020
Bell Centre	Montreal	26,452 / 26,452 (100%)	$2,269,580
The Palace of Auburn Hills	Auburn Hills	7,987 / 11,135 (71%)	$474,198
Target Center	Minneapolis	15,508 / 15,508 (100%)	$1,261,730
Rexall Place	Edmonton	11,634 / 13,127 (89%)	$855,923
Staples Center	Los Angeles	14,148 / 14,148 (100%)	$1,045,114
Oracle Arena	Oakland	9,348 / 11,488 (81%)	$659,387
American Airlines Center	Dallas	10,736 / 11,443 (94%)	$600,374
BankAtlantic Center	Sunrise	11,136 / 13,361 (83%)	$659,244
Mohegan Sun Arena	Uncasville	4,096 / 4,386 (93%)	$356,751
Odyssey Arena	Belfast	29,603 / 29,603 (100%)	$2,341,920
The O_{2}	Dublin	24,517 / 24,517 (100%)	$1,933,164
The O_{2} Arena	London	166,717 / 172,050 (98%)	$12,076,950
Manchester Arena	Manchester	65,164 / 65,164 (100%)	$4,224,090
LG Arena	Birmingham	28,931 / 29,362 (98%)	$2,739,261
Sportpaleis	Antwerp	35,392 / 35,414 (99%)	$2,074,020
O_{2} World Hamburg	Hamburg	13,409 / 13,409 (100%)	$970,164
TOTAL		502,048 / 517,837 (97%)	$36,617,890
