= What's My Name? (Rihanna song) =

2010 song by Rihanna featuring Drake

Single by Rihanna featuring Drake

from the album Loud
- Released: October 25, 2010
- Recorded: 2010
- Studio: Roc the Mic Studios (New York City), Westlake Recording Studios (Los Angeles); The Hit Factory (Miami)
- Genre: Electro-R&B
- Length: 4:23
- Label: Def Jam; SRP
- Songwriters: Mikkel S. Eriksen; Tor Erik Hermansen; Esther Dean; Traci Hale; Aubrey Graham
- Producers: Stargate; Kuk Harrell

Rihanna singles chronology
"Only Girl (In the World)" (2010)	"What's My Name?" (2010)	"Who's That Chick?" (2010)

Drake singles chronology
"What Up" (2010)	"What's My Name?" (2010)	"Fall for Your Type" (2010)

Music video
- "What's My Name?" on YouTube

"What's My Name?" is a song recorded by Barbadian singer Rihanna, for her fifth studio album Loud (2010). Featuring guest vocals from Canadian rapper Drake, the song was released as the second single from Loud on October 25, 2010, through Def Jam Recordings and in Germany on January 21, 2011, as a single through Universal Music Group. The dancehall-infused electro-R&B song was produced by the Norwegian production duo Stargate, and was written by the duo along with Ester Dean, Traci Hale, and Drake. Lyrically, it incorporates themes of romance and sex. The song was well received by music critics, who were complimentary towards its production, lyrical content and Rihanna's vocal performance. Drake's contribution was also praised, though a few suggested his rapping was typical or that his presence unnecessary.

"What's My Name?" topped the US Billboard Hot 100 chart, giving Rihanna her third number-one single in 2010, as well as her eighth overall on the chart. The song also topped the charts in Hungary and the United Kingdom and reached the top five in Canada, Ireland, New Zealand, Norway and Slovakia. The song is certified six-times Platinum in the US and Gold or higher in eight additional countries. The song received a nomination at the 54th Grammy Awards for Best Rap/Sung Collaboration.

An accompanying music video, directed by Philip Andelman, plays a romantic encounter between Rihanna and Drake in a grocery store along with romantic scenes between the pair and Rihanna walking through Manhattan's Lower East Side. "What's My Name?" was promoted with live performances, including Saturday Night Live in the United States and the series 7 finale of The X Factor in the United Kingdom in December 2010.

== Development and release ==
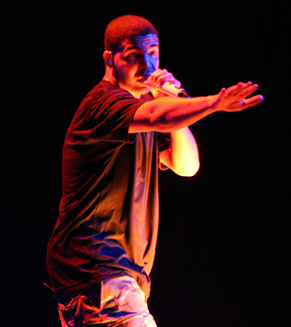
Drake wrote and rapped a verse on "What's My Name?"

In November 2009, in an interview with MTV News, Canadian rapper Drake praised Rihanna's then-upcoming fourth studio album, Rated R (2009). During the same interview, he revealed that they have collaborated on a track that didn't make the final cut on the album, "the record we have is great. It's a special record, so for it not to make it, I know something had to click. It's all good. I think the project's gonna be great no matter what." Talking for the same publication, Tor Erik Hermansen of Norwegian production duo Stargate recalled that during an event Rihanna met with Drake backstage and asked him to record a verse on her song, "She's calling me up saying, 'Where are the files?' That's one thing you don't hear often from artists on her level." "What's My Name?" was written by Mikkel S. Eriksen, Hermansen, Ester Dean, Traci Hale and Drake, while the production was done by Stargate. In an interview for HitQuarters, Hale explained that she got into the project thanks to a phone call she received from Dean. She also elaborated that her work on the song was mostly lyrical, while Dean and Stargate did most of the music. When asked what's the inspiration behind the song she stated, "Oh love, love, love! And it's sexy – it started as a real sexy track and then you put something sexy over it."

The collaboration was originally intended to be a remix of the song, while the solo version would have been included on Rihanna's fifth studio album Loud. However, in the end it made the final cut on the album. Regarding Drake's inclusion on the song, Rihanna told MTV News, "Drake is the hottest rapper out right now and we've always been trying to work together." According to her, when he heard the song he liked it and wrote his verse after three days. Rihanna has further described the song as very youthful, playful and very melodic track; according to her that's why Drake was the perfect choice to be on it, "cause he's a young rapper who has incredible melodies". "What's My Name?" was released as the second single from Loud; it was sent to rhythmic contemporary radio in the United States on October 25, 2010, and to contemporary hit radio the following day. The single was made available for digital download on November 12 via the iTunes Store. A CD single featuring the song and a remix of it was released on January 21, 2011, in Germany.

== Production ==
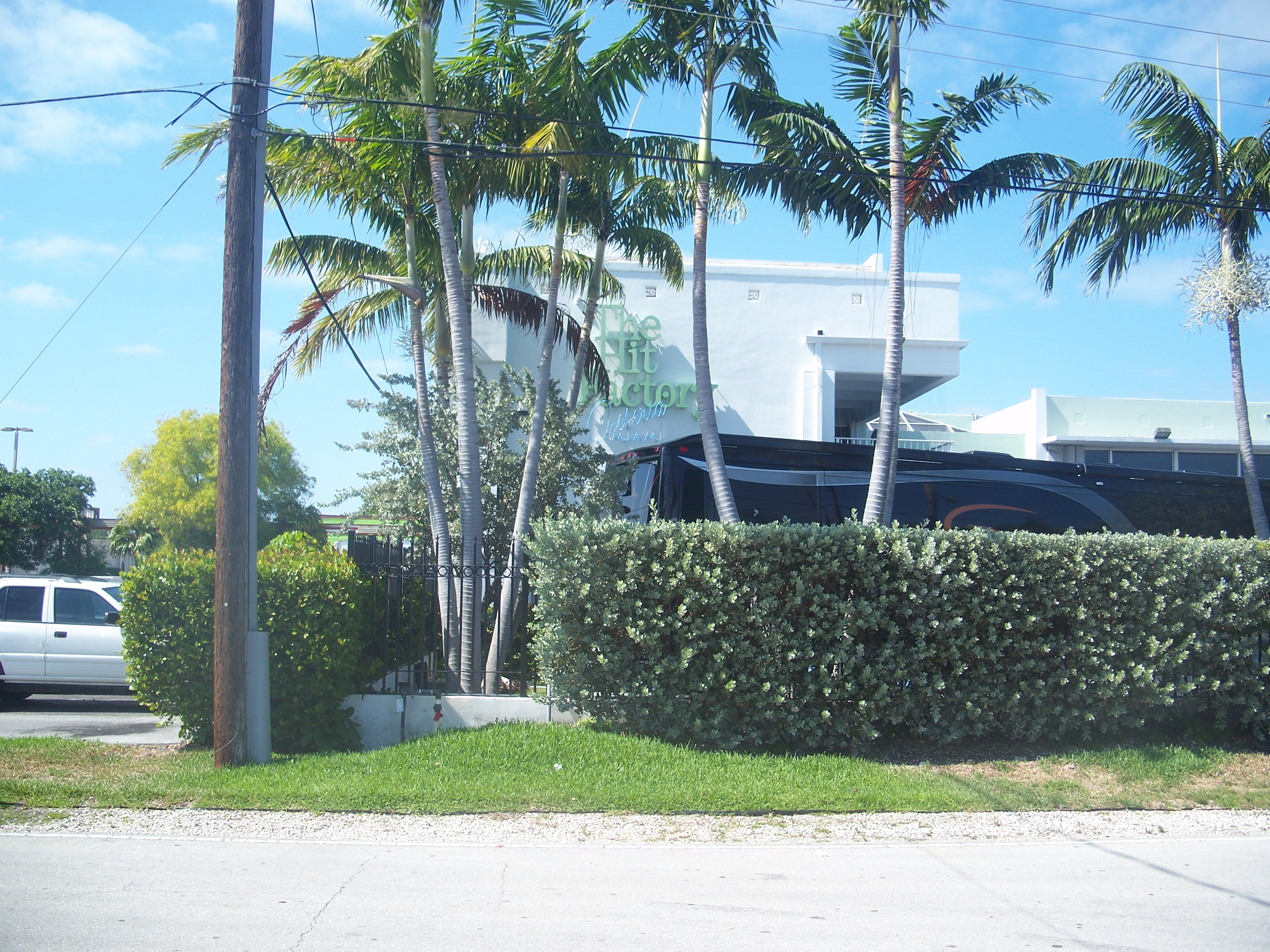
The Hit Factory studios were one of the recording locations of the song

"What's My Name?" was recorded at the Roc the Mic Studios in New York City and at the Westlake Recording Studios in Los Angeles by Eriksen and Miles Walker. Rihanna's vocals were recorded by Kuk Harrell, Josh Gudwin and Marcos Tovar and Harrell also produced them. Bobby Campbell served as the vocal assistant. Drake's vocals were recorded by Noah "40" Shebib at The Hit Factory Studios in Miami. The recording of his vocals was assisted by Noel Cadastre and Brandon Joner. Its mixing was done by Phil Tan at Ninja Beat Club in Atlanta while Damien Lewis provided an additional and assistant engineering. All the instruments were provided by Eriksen and Hermansen while Dean sang the background vocals.

In May 2011, in The Mix Review, an analyzing commercial productions, Mike Senior of Sound on Sound revisited the original mixing of the song. According to him, before he started the mix, Senior played the song a couple of times before releasing what thing about it "bugged" him. Working it out, he noted that the harmony of the mix is undermined by the kick drum. "What's My Name?" contains basic harmonies that are a bar of F♯ minor, a bar of A major and two bars of D-major. Senior stated that on the other side however, there's a very little in the arrangement that could be seen like a traditional melodic bass-line. As the result of that, the "808-style" kick-drum's pronounce pitched components with a power of 37 Hz and 74 Hz fill that help void with a 'D' note. According to Senior, "the problem is that this only really supports the D‑major chord, destabilizing the home chord of F# minor (by implying that it's actually part of a D‑major 7th chord) and clashing nastily with the A‑major." He further stated that although might not be as apparent on small speakers, it still represents "weakness" for him. The section of the song at 3:12 has four bars without the kick-drum and four without it.

== Composition ==
"What's My Name?" is a mid-tempo electro-R&B song, produced by Norwegian producers, StarGate, who return Rihanna to the "Island-pop" of her early career with a backing track consisting of "heavy reggae" and ska beats with synthesised organs. Bill Lamb from About.com noted that before Rihanna's vocals start, there is an internal buildup of "dreamy drum machine rhythms". Overall he described the backing track as "simple" and "atmospheric". The song was written by Mikkel S. Eriksen, Tor Erik Hermansen, Ester Dean, Traci Hale and Drake and incorporates themes of "sex and romance". Jocelyn Vena from MTV wrote the vocal delivery and lyrical content of the song as "sassy". Lamb as said that "lyrically, [What's My Name?] amounts to romantic, sexual sweet nothings". Rihanna called the collaboration "young and playful", something which Stacy Anderson from Spin and Nick Levine of Digital Spy both picked up, when commenting on the sexual innuendos in the lyrics. In particular, Anderson and Levine noted an arithmetic-based joke during Drake's guest vocal, where he says "The square root of 69 is 8 something, right / 'Cuz I been trying to work it out". Megan Vick from Billboard noted that "Rihanna's lush vocal turn denotes a startling leap in maturity from previous singles".

== Critical reception ==
Thomas Conner from the Chicago Sun-Times neither praised nor criticized the song, but instead focused on the steamy mood of the composition. "[Rihanna] and panting duet partner Drake steam the recording studio windows as he raps a helpless play-by-play". Bill Lamb from About.com gave the song a positive review, saying that "There it is, the chorus opens the track with "Oh na na...what's my name?" and the hook is firmly implanted. It's not long before Drake's added on rap kicks in with clever, sexy and romantic rhyming. Then the dreamy drum machine rhythms and Rihanna's vocals kick in again. This is a hit ... "What's My Name?" is a good addition to that romantic evening playlist." Jocelyn Vena from MTV praised the "song's chorus" and "Drake's verse". Molly Lambert of Pitchfork Media praised Rihanna's performance saying that "On 'What's My Name', Rihanna doesn't have to tell us how desirable she is – it is a given. There is never any doubt in her delivery that Rihanna really might as well be the only girl in the world".

Nick Levine from Digital Spy said " 'What's My Name?' is essentially the long, luxuriant lovemaking session to 'Rude Boy's hard'n'fast rut... it manages to stay classy even when Drake makes a dodgy joke about the 'square root of 69' and Rihanna delivers a not-so-coy reference to oral sex." Megan Vick from Billboard said "As much as 'What's My Name' is a joint effort, Rihanna owns the song by delivering a more polished version of her pop persona." According to Jon Dolan from Rolling Stone with the release of "What's My Name?" as second single from the album Rihanna created "a perfect little tropical storm". He continued: "[...] Over dark, humid synths and swirling snare skitters, she's in full-on Caribbean-queen mode, dialing up her islander accent and rolling out a to-do list for any adult male seeking entrance into her chambers". However, he also criticized Drake's "square-root of 69" line, stating that Drake sounds like a nerdy guy from a fraternity while he raps it.

== Chart performance ==
"What's My Name?" debuted at number 67 on Billboard's Hot R&B/Hip-Hop Songs chart for the chart week of October 30, 2010 and steadily rose to a peak of number two. The song debuted at number 83 on the Billboard Hot 100 after being sent to mainstream radio, and in the third week it jumped to number one, after being released digitally, becoming Rihanna's eighth number-one single on the chart and Drake's first. "What's My Name?" managed to reach number one on the chart, before the lead single "Only Girl (In the World)", which topped the chart after two weeks. In the same week, it reached the top spot on US Hot Digital Songs with first week sales of 235,000. Rihanna became the first artist in Billboard Hot 100 history to have their first single go to number one after their second single ("Whats My Name?" followed by "Only Girl (In the World)"). Also, Rihanna became the first artist to score a trio of Hot 100 leaders in a year since 2008, when she achieved the same feat with "Take a Bow", "Disturbia" and featured vocals on T.I.'s "Live Your Life." By its seventh week of digital release, the single crossed the one million mark. The song has sold 3,095,000 downloads in the United States alone, and has been certified 6× platinum by the Recording Industry Association of America.

In the United Kingdom, following the release of Loud, "What's My Name?" debuted at number eighteen on the UK Singles Chart on November 27, 2010. The next week, on December 5, the song reached a new peak of number eight, and during the same week, Rihanna had two other top 10 singles with "Only Girl (In the World)" at number seven and "Who's That Chick?" (by David Guetta featuring Rihanna) at number nine. With that, Rihanna became the fourth artist in UK chart history to make this achievement. On December 19, 2010, the song reached a new peak of number two, where it remained for three weeks before reaching number one on January 9, 2011, becoming Rihanna's fifth number one in the UK and Drake's first. As a result, Rihanna became the first female artist in UK chart history to have a number-one single in five consecutive years. It was also the second time in her career that Rihanna simultaneously topped the singles and albums charts in the UK, the first time being in May 2007 when "Umbrella" and Good Girl Gone Bad topped the UK Singles Chart and UK Albums Chart, respectively. Rihanna would score another chart double later that year, this time, with "We Found Love" and Talk That Talk. "What's My Name?" was also Drake's first UK number one and were his highest-charting single until "Work" with Rihanna in 2016. As of January 2016, the song has sold 847,800 copies in the UK.

Internationally, the song was a commercial success but more moderately compared to Loud's previous single "Only Girl (In The World)", who topped more than 10 national charts. "What's My Name?" topped Hungarian and Scottish charts, and reached top ten in Norway, Portugal, Ireland, Slovakia, Finland and Israel, top twenty in Germany, Sweden, the Netherlands, France, Austria, Denmark and South Korea and top thirty in Belgium.

== Music video ==
Rihanna shot the music video for the song on September 26, 2010, on the Lower East Side of Manhattan in New York City and also a small scene in India with Raam Kapoor and director Philip Andelman. Parts of the video shot with Drake were filmed on October 27, 2010. The music video premiered on November 12, 2010, on Rihanna's Vevo channel on YouTube.

The video starts with different shots from the city, then turns to a store where Drake is speaking to the cashier. Rihanna enters, grabbing his attention. She smiles at him and walks towards a fridge and grabs a milk carton. Drake follows her and his verse begins. He holds her hand as he raps his verse, the milk carton falls from her hand as she holds his, thus spilling milk on the floor. When Drake's verse is over, Rihanna pushes him and walks away with a smile.

When Rihanna's verse starts, she is shown walking on the street, dancing, greeting regular folks, and singing. Shots of people playing instruments and walking on the street are shown, in addition to scenes where Rihanna and Drake are in a bedroom together, flirting, talking, eating Chinese takeout, and drinking champagne. The final scene shows Rihanna in an outdoor Jamaican-themed night party with the people already shown are now playing instruments as Rihanna sings and dances. The video ends with Drake kissing Rihanna on her cheek in the bedroom. As of August 2025, the video has surpassed 1 billion views on YouTube.

== Live performances ==
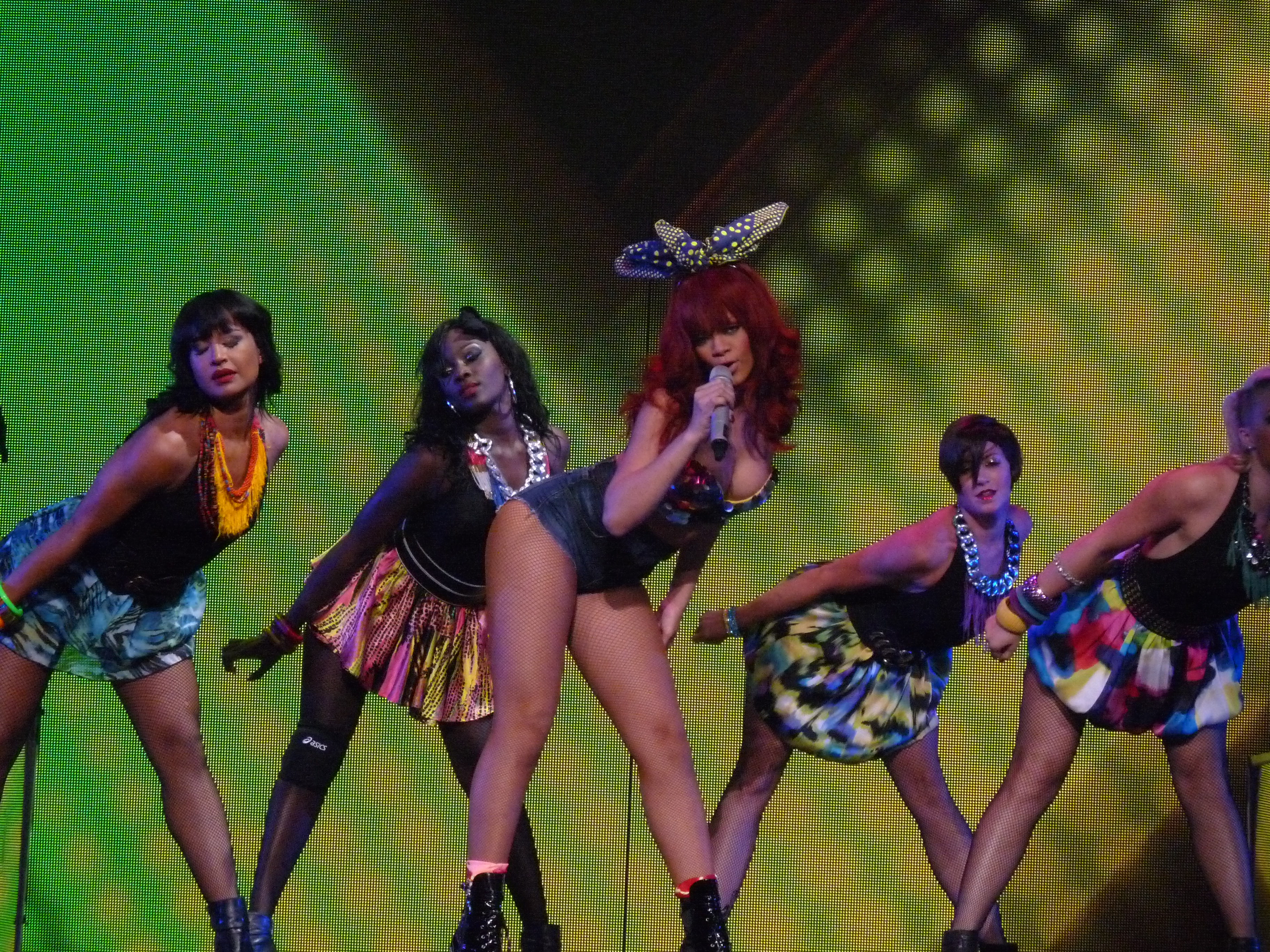
Rihanna performing "What's My Name?" on her 2011 Loud Tour

"What's My Name?" was performed for the first time (without Drake) on October 30, 2010, during her stint on the NBC television series Saturday Night Live. Her outfit for the performance (high-waisted Daisy Dukes and a bikini top) drew comparisons to an outfit worn by Rihanna's friend, singer Katy Perry. Then on November 15, prior to the album's release, Rihanna returned to her performance of "What's My Name?" for MTV's The Seven, Live from Times Square, New York. Just a day later, she performed the single again, this time on the Late Show with David Letterman. On November 17, 2010, she was interviewed for and performed the song as part of her set list for her appearance on Good Morning America. At the American Music Awards of 2010 on November 21, 2010, Rihanna performed a short medley of hits which included "Love the Way You Lie (Part II)", "What's My Name?" and ended with "Only Girl (In the World)".

In the United Kingdom, Rihanna was invited back to series 7 of The X Factor on December 11, 2010, to perform "Unfaithful" with finalist Matt Cardle and a solo performance of "What's My Name?". The finale was watched by fifteen million viewers but attracted complaints, in the thousands, about Rihanna's choice of outfit and sexual performance. Vivienne Patterson, director of Mediawatch UK, said "I don't think it was suitable for a pre-watershed broadcast, I think that's quite clear". UK's media regulator, Ofcom, later confirmed that it had launched an investigation into the affair after 4000 complaints were registered regarding Rihanna and Christina Aguilera's appearances at The X Factor finale. Rihanna performed the song with Drake for the first time at the 53rd Annual Grammy Awards on February 13, 2011, as well as performing the song as a part of a medley with "Only Girl (In the World)" and "S&M" live at the 2011 Brit Awards on February 15, 2011. Rihanna also performed the song with Drake at the NBA All Star Game on February 20, 2011, as well as performing the song as a part of a medley of "Umbrella" / "Only Girl (In the World)" / "Rude Boy" / "All of the Lights" (with Kanye West). The song was part of the set list for the Australian leg of the Last Girl on Earth tour, Loud Tour and the Diamonds World Tour. In May 2011 Rihanna gave a performance of "What's My Name?" on the Today show, as a part of the Summer Concert series, along with "Only Girl (In the World)", "S&M", and "California King Bed". Rihanna performed "What's My Name?" at Radio 1's Hackney Weekend on May 24, 2012, as the sixth song on the set list. She also performed the song at the 2016 MTV Video Music Awards in a medley with "Rude Boy", "Pon de Replay" and "Work".

== Formats and track listings ==
- Digital download
1. "What's My Name?" (featuring Drake) – 4:24
- Digital download (remixes EP)
1. "What's My Name?" (Low Sunday Up On It Extended) – 5:03
2. "What's My Name?" (Low Sunday Up On It Instrumental) – 5:00
3. "What's My Name?" (Kik Klap Mixshow) – 4:10
4. "What's My Name?" (Original Version Clean) – 4:27
- German CD
1. "What's My Name?" (featuring Drake) – 4:24
2. "What's My Name?" (Low Sunday "Up On It" Radio) – 3:47

== Credits and personnel ==
Credits adapted from the liner notes of Loud.

Location

- Recorded at Roc the Mic Studios, New York City; Westlake Recording Studios, Los Angeles; The Hit Factory, Miami
- Mixed at Ninja Beat Club, Atlanta

Personnel

- Songwriting – Mikkel S. Eriksen, Tor Erik Hermansen, Ester Dean, Traci Hale, Aubrey Graham
- Production – Stargate
- Recording – Mikkel S. Eriksen, Miles Walker
- Vocal production – Kuk Harrell
- Vocals recorded by – Kuk Harrell, Noah "40" Shebib, Josh Gudwin, Marcos Tovar
- Vocal recording assistant – Bobby Campbell, Noel Cadastre, Brandon Joner
- Mixing – Phil Tan
- Engineering assistant – Damien Lewis
- Instrumentation – Mikkel S. Eriksen, Tor Erik Hermansen
- Background vocals – Ester Dean

== Charts ==
=== Weekly charts ===
Weekly chart performance for "What's My Name?"
Chart (2010–2011)	Peak position
Australia (ARIA)	18
Austria (Ö3 Austria Top 40)	13
Belgium (Ultratop 50 Flanders)	28
Belgium (Ultratop 50 Wallonia)	40
Brazil (Billboard Hot 100)	32
Brazil (Billboard Hot Pop Songs)	9
Canada Hot 100 (Billboard)	5
Croatia International Airplay (HRT)	5
Czech Republic Airplay (ČNS IFPI)	36
Denmark (Tracklisten)	19
Euro Digital Song Sales (Billboard)	2
Finland (Suomen virallinen lista)	7
France (SNEP)	16
France Download (SNEP)	5
Germany (GfK)	12
Hungary (Rádiós Top 40)	1
Ireland (IRMA)	3
Israel International Airplay (Media Forest)	3
Italy (FIMI)	8
Mexico (Billboard Mexican Airplay)	12
Netherlands (Dutch Top 40)	23
Netherlands (Single Top 100)	20
New Zealand (Recorded Music NZ)	3
Norway (VG-lista)	4
Poland Dance (ZPAV)	28
Portugal (Billboard)	2
Scottish Singles Sales (Official Charts)	1
Slovakia Airplay (ČNS IFPI)	3
South Korea (Gaon International Chart)	15
Spain (Promusicae)	42
Sweden (Sverigetopplistan)	20
Switzerland (Schweizer Hitparade)	13
UK Singles (Official Charts)	1
UK Hip Hop/R&B (Official Charts)	1
US Billboard Hot 100	1
US Adult Pop Airplay (Billboard)	30
US Dance Club Songs (Billboard)	6
US Dance Airplay (Billboard)	3
US Hot R&B/Hip-Hop Songs (Billboard)	2
US Pop Airplay (Billboard)	4
US Rhythmic Airplay (Billboard)	1

=== Year-end charts ===
Annual chart rankings for "What's My Name?"
Chart (2010)	Position
Australia Urban (ARIA)	32
UK Singles (OCC)	27

Chart (2011)	Position
Brazil (Crowley)	43
Canada (Canadian Hot 100)	32
France (SNEP)	85
Hungary (Rádiós Top 40)	33
Italy (Musica e dischi)	62
South Korea Foreign (Circle)	65
UK Singles (OCC)	49
US Billboard Hot 100	20
US Hot R&B/Hip-Hop Songs (Billboard)	18
US Mainstream Top 40 (Billboard)	30
US Radio Songs (Billboard)	11
US Rhythmic (Billboard)	6

== Certifications ==
Certifications for "What's My Name?"
Region	Certification	Certified units/sales
Australia (ARIA)	5× Platinum	350,000^{‡}
Brazil (Pro-Música Brasil)	Diamond	250,000^{‡}
Denmark (IFPI Danmark)	Platinum	90,000^{‡}
Germany (BVMI)	Gold	150,000^{‡}
Italy (FIMI)	Gold	15,000^{*}
New Zealand (RMNZ)	3× Platinum	90,000^{‡}
Sweden (GLF)	Platinum	40,000^{‡}
Switzerland (IFPI Switzerland)	Gold	15,000^{^}
United Kingdom (BPI)	3× Platinum	1,800,000^{‡}
United States (RIAA)	6× Platinum	6,000,000^{‡}
^{*} Sales figures based on certification alone.^{^} Shipments figures based on certification alone.^{‡} Sales+streaming figures based on certification alone.

== Release history ==
Release history
Region	Date	Format	Version	Label(s)	Ref.
United States	October 25, 2010	Rhythmic contemporary radio	Original	Def Jam	
United States	October 26, 2010	Contemporary hit radio	Original	Def Jam	
Brazil	November 12, 2010	Digital download	Original	Def Jam	
Spain	November 12, 2010	Digital download	Original	Def Jam	
Germany	January 21, 2011	CD	2-track	Def Jam; Universal	

== See also ==
- List of Billboard Hot 100 number-one singles of 2010
- List of Billboard Rhythmic number-one songs of the 2010s
- List of UK Singles Chart number ones of the 2010s
- List of UK R&B Singles Chart number ones of 2010
- List of UK R&B Singles Chart number ones of 2011
- List of UK Singles Chart Christmas number twos
- List of number-one singles of the 2010s (Hungary)
