= California King Bed =

2011 single by Rihanna

Single by Rihanna

from the album Loud
- B-side: "S&M" (Sidney Samson club remix)
- Released: May 13, 2011
- Recorded: 2010
- Studio: We the Best (Miami, Florida); Burst HQ (Wisconsin)
- Genre: Rock; R&B
- Length: 4:12
- Label: Def Jam; SRP
- Songwriters: Andrew Harr; Jermaine Jackson; Priscilla Renea; Alex Delicata; Robyn Fenty
- Producers: The Runners; Kuk Harrell (vocals)

Rihanna singles chronology
"Man Down" (2011)	"California King Bed" (2011)	"Cheers (Drink to That)" (2011)

Music video
- "California King Bed" on YouTube

"California King Bed" is a song by Barbadian singer Rihanna from her fifth studio album, Loud (2010). The song was written and produced by Andrew Harr and Jermaine Jackson, of the American production duo the Runners, with Priscilla Renea, Alex Delicata and Rihanna. The song was chosen to be a single from the album through Twitter, and it was released as the album's sixth single on May 13, 2011, by Def Jam. "California King Bed" is a rock and R&B power ballad. It received mixed reviews from music critics, with some praising Rihanna's vocals and others deeming them overwrought.

Commercially, the song topped the Polish and Slovak charts, achieved a top-five placing in Australia, Austria, Czech Republic and Portugal, while also reaching the top-ten in Germany, New Zealand, Switzerland, the United Kingdom and others. In the United States, it reached the top-forty on the Billboard Hot 100 chart and topped the Dance Club Songs chart.

== Background and release ==
In 2024, Priscilla Renea revealed to Complex that she wrote the song in ten minutes while browsing furniture online. She also mentioned that the song was originally intended to be pitched to Kelly Clarkson.

On March 1, 2011, Rihanna asked fans to help her choose the next single from Loud using Twitter, saying that she would film a music video within the next couple of weeks. After an influx of suggestions, the singer said she had narrowed the options down to four songs: "Man Down", "California King Bed", "Cheers (Drink to That)" and "Fading". On March 12, she confirmed that "California King Bed" had been selected as the next international single. However, the releases were switched, and "Man Down" was sent to rhythmic and urban radio stations in the United States on May 3 – before the May 13 release of "California King Bed" – making "Man Down" and "California King Bed" the fifth and sixth singles from Loud. The song was released digitally on May 13, 2011, through digital download via iTunes. In the United States, it was first serviced to adult contemporary radio stations on May 16, 2011, and later to contemporary hit radio on May 30, 2011. Later, after their impact on radio, the song was also issued on CD single format in Europe and also as an extended play (EP) digital with nine remixes from the original track.

== Composition and lyrical interpretation ==
'California King Bed'
A 25 second sample of the break-up power ballad "California King Bed", where Rihanna sings the chorus.

"California King Bed" was written by its producers The Runners (Andrew Harr and Jermaine Jackson) with additional writing by Priscilla Renea, Alex Delicata and Rihanna, with vocal production done by Kuk Harrell. Renea also provided background vocals, while Delicata played the electric and acoustic guitar. Its recording took place in 2010 in the studios We The Best in Miami and Burst HQ in Wisconsin. The song is a rock and R&B power ballad with "acoustic guitar (complete with audible string scrapes), soft piano keys and intimate melancholy, building into a massive power-balladish chorus", as noted by NME's Emily Mackay. According to the sheet music published at Musicnotes.com by Alfred Publishing Co., Inc., "California King Bed" is set in common time in the key of G major with a moderately slow tempo of 85 beats per minute. The song follows a chord progression of G/B–C2 for the verses, and G–D–Em–C in the chorus. Rihanna's vocal range in the song spans from the low note of E_{3} to the high note of C_{5}. Both Ryan Burlenson of the website Consequence of Sound and James Reed of The Boston Globe compared the song with Taylor Swift's material. Mackay compared it with Beyoncé's "If I Were a Boy" (2008).

Lyrically, the song was considered a "break-up song" that talks about "the waking death of a relationship, the stage of limbo before the final crash." As Digital Spy's Robert Copsey added, its lyrics discuss "the kind of separate-togetherness felt moments before a break-up." Adam R. Holz of Plugged In (publication) noticed that "'California King' ponders how a woman could be so physically close to a man yet so emotionally distant. She doesn't get an answer, but she does quip about evidence of their sexual relationship on the sheets the next morning. The woman also equates asking the man if he loves her with emotional weakness." During the chorus, she sings: "In this California king bed we’re ten thousand miles apart / I’ve been California wishing on these stars for your heart / For me, my California king."

== Critical reception ==
Andy Gill of The Independent and Ryan Dombell from Pitchfork Media both noted that the song embodies all the elements of a big power ballad, with the former stating that it is "Rihanna's best vocal performance" and the latter concurring, labeling the song as a "'I Don't Want to Miss a Thing' type power ballad genetically engineered to soundtrack a bi-coastal Kate Hudson rom-com." Daniel Brockman of Boston Phoenix writer perceived the song as an "innocuous soft jam." Stacey Anderson of Spin magazine was positive, noting that "it's so well-delivered, in fact, that it's hard to hear." Scott Shetler of Popcrush was receptive with the release of a down-tempo ballad, saying that "it’s refreshing to hear a song built around her impressive voice." Robert Copsey of Digital Spy gave the song four out of five stars, stating it "may pull in the reins as far as the hectic dance beats and sado-masochistic lyrics go, but it's no less beefy and extravagant." He also noted that "[s]he belts out in a range well beyond her natural vocal ability." Thomas Conner of Chicago Sun-Times concluded that "The acoustic strums of 'California King Bed' build to a cinematic, Diane Warren-sized breakup chorus."

Slant Magazine's Sal Cinquemani called "California King Bed" a "slushy acoustic ballad whose clever metaphor is all but suffocated beneath the song's cheesy production choices". Entertainment Weekly's Kyle Anderson gave a mixed review of the song, explaining that Rihanna "doesn't have the chops to be a balladeer, which made the torch-song quality of 'California King Bed' land with a thud." In a different perception, Henry Goldblatt of the same publication graded the song with a B+ and praised the "irresistible heartbreak in the song" and added that Rihanna's voice "demonstrates more range and power than her older material." Andy Kellman of AllMusic and Emily Mackay of NME were more critical of the song in their review, with the former calling the song an "overwrought rock weeper" and the latter saying it is a "howler of a ballad, with shlocky acoustic intro, trite piano and a faux-Slash solo."

== Chart performance ==
Before being officially released, "California King Bed" debuted on the Australian Singles Chart at number 61 on April 11, 2011, and peaked at number four for two consecutive weeks. The song has since been certified quadruple platinum by the Australian Recording Industry Association (ARIA), for 280,000 equivalent units. The song also made an appearance on the New Zealand Singles Chart before its official release, debuting at number eighteen on April 18, 2011, before eventually peaking at number four for two consecutive weeks. The song has since been certified Gold for sales of over 7,500 copies. In the week of June 11, 2011, the song reached a peak of number eight on the UK Singles Chart and three on the UK Hip Hop and R&B Singles Chart. In the United States, the song made its debut on the week ending June 4, 2011, at number 80 on the Billboard Hot 100 chart and reached a peak of number 37, becoming Rihanna's 25th top forty hit on the chart. "California King Bed" ranked at number 47 on Billboard magazine's best-selling Dance/Clubs songs of 2011.

== Music video ==
=== Background and synopsis ===
A scene from the video, where Rihanna and her suitor sit at opposite ends of a "California King Bed", signifying that although they are in the same bed, they are a distance away from each other.

The music video for "California King Bed" was shot on March 17, 2011 by Anthony Mandler, who has frequently worked with Rihanna. Mandler directed the videos for other singles from Loud including "Only Girl (In the World)" and "Man Down". The creative director, Ciarra Pardo, fabricated a custom made eighteen foot long bed, which was designed with a special feature to transport Rihanna the full distance from one side to the other. On May 4, 2011, Rihanna posted a picture of the video which showed her laying on a man while looking in the camera. She also tweeted "Bout to tweet u sumn I cud get in trouble for! But I know ur anxious." The full video premiered Monday, May 9, 2011, on Rihanna's official website and her Vevo account. In an interview with Jocelyn Vena of MTV News, Mandler spoke of his and Rihanna's long collaborative history, saying:

I think it's something that is so unique about Rihanna whatever she's doing, whatever character she's playing, whatever side of herself she's showing, she's in it 1,000 percent... And I think the song and the theme of this song, she wanted to obviously show a softer side, a lighter side, one that's caught in maybe a tumultuous relationship... There's so much variety with her and it's been such a journey with her.

Almost the whole video set is made in tropical and romantic setting. The video begins with a shot of Rihanna herself laying down in grass. Then scenes of Rihanna walking on the beach and Rihanna curling up on the chair are shown. This is followed by her own and her partner holding each other closely in bed, sitting on different sides of a large bed, and other scenes featuring Rihanna singing through sheer curtains and drapery. In the video there are also black-white scenes showing Rihanna touching to a stone wall.

=== Reception ===
As stated by Jason Lipshutz of Billboard, in this video, Rihanna returned to nature as in her video for her previous single, "Only Girl (In the World)", which features nearly the same colors as the "California King Bed" video. Lipshutz also commented that Rihanna's just rolled-out-bed appearance is completed by the modest, cream-colored attire in the airy, light-filled clip. Brad Wete of Entertainment Weekly gave a positive review of the video, writing: "Instead of being in complete control, here she is—vulnerable, open, and unsure. The video captures the feel of 'King Bed,' not that it's a difficult one to grasp." Jessica Sinclair of Long Island Press was also positive about the video, praising the sensual side of Rihanna. A writer of The Huffington Post concluded: "In the video for her new video, 'California King Bed,' the Barbadian pop star slows it down and shows her sensitive side, holding notes and bearing her soul over a troubled relationship. Set entirely in a gorgeously pink-palleted open air room overlooking the beach, the winds swirl and blow the curtains dramatically around the heart broken singer." The writer finished the review saying that "Not much happens in the video – but then, that's the point." Amber Katz of MTV Buzzworthy compared the video with Fergie's "Big Girls Don't Cry" saying, that they "Both are midtempo, ballady and filmed in a soft-focus domestic setting." Katz also complimented the bed in the video saying that it "evoke[s] a very Caribbean vibe, a shout-out to Rihanna's native Barbados, no doubt." Both Nicole Eggenberger of OK! and Eleanor Young of Marie Claire commented that the video uses a lot of sex appeal which was a departure from Rihanna's older videos.

== Live performances ==
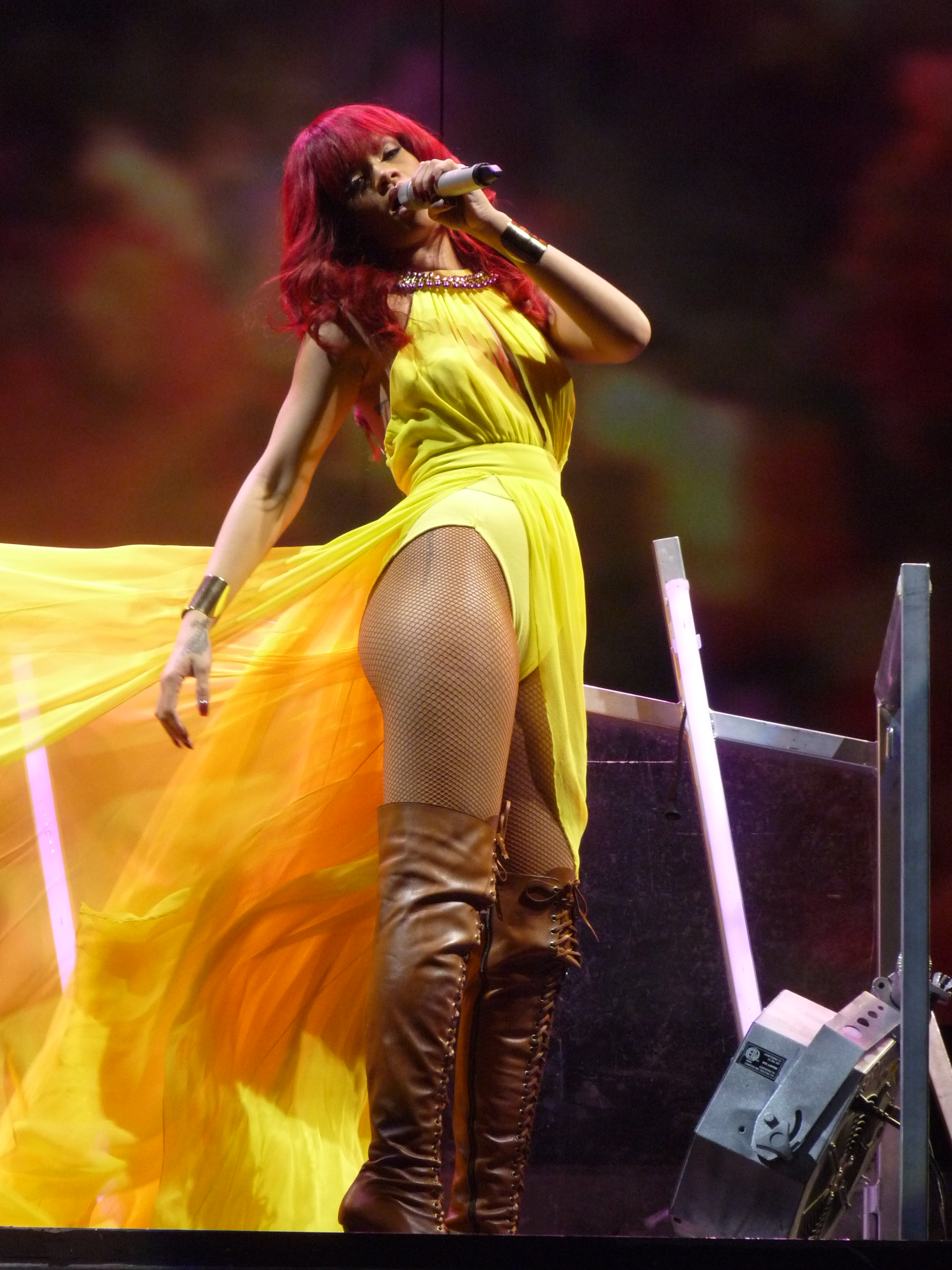
Rihanna performing "California King Bed" on the Loud Tour in Florida.

Rihanna performed the song for the first time alongside Sugarland lead vocalist Jennifer Nettles, at the ACM Awards held by the Academy of Country Music on April 3, 2011. She was also a special guest star on the tenth season of American Idol on April 14, 2011. The performance featured Rihanna in a floor-length, heavily textured rose-colored gown, which she adorned as she appeared from behind flowing ceiling height curtains. Kara Warner of MTV News complimented the performance, saying "the 23-year-old rocked the house with an ethereal performance of her ballad 'California King Bed.'" A writer of Rolling Stone wrote: "It's a classy, laid-back performance with Rihanna in a lovely gown, backed up by interpretative dancers caressing large pieces of fabric that are probably meant to evoke bed sheets, but look a bit more like giant strips of toilet paper hanging from the ceiling. But either way, this is quite nice."

In March 2011, Rihanna was appointed spokeswoman for the "100 Years of Skin Care" Nivea Commercial campaign, which featured "California King Bed" as the song used in the commercials. As part of promotion for the campaign, Rihanna performed the song at private events in several European cities in May 2011, including Hamburg, Milan and Paris. The song was also performed on NBC's Today show on May 27, 2011, as part of their Summer Concert Series. The set also featured Rihanna performing her previous US Billboard Hot 100 number-one hits from Loud; "Only Girl (In the World)", "What's My Name?" and "S&M". The song is included on the set-list of the Loud Tour (2011).

== Other versions ==
Pia Toscano and Stefano Langone, contestants of the tenth season of American Idol, covered the song during one of the nights. American rapper Snoop Dogg, released an unofficial remix of the song along with a music video. In his version of the song he sings the lines "California dreamin', schemin', you got me gleamin'/ I need you on my team 'n you get my meanin'/ It sound crazy but it's amazing/ Lay down with me so we can make some babies." The accompanying music video a girl which looks like Kim Kardashian waiting him at the hotel, while the official video of the song is played on TV screens.

== Formats and track listings ==
- Digital download
1. "California King Bed" – 4:11
- CD (2-track)
1. "California King Bed" – 4:11
2. "S&M" (Sidney Samson club remix) – 6:48
- Digital download (remixes)
1. "California King Bed" (DJ Chus & Abel Ramos radio) – 3:27
2. "California King Bed" (the Bimbo Jones radio) – 3:13
3. "California King Bed" (Bassjackers radio) – 3:19
4. "California King Bed" (DJ Chus & Abel Ramos club mix) – 6:07
5. "California King Bed" (the Bimbo Jones club mix) – 6:08
6. "California King Bed" (Bassjackers club mix) – 5:01
7. "California King Bed" (DJ Chus & Abel Ramos dub) – 6:13
8. "California King Bed" (the Bimbo Jones dub) – 6:05
9. "California King Bed" (Bassjackers dub) – 5:02

== Credits and personnel ==
Credits are adapted from the liner notes of Loud.

Management

- ASCAP/BMI/Copyright Control
- The Runners appear on behalf of Trac-N-Field Entertainment and We the Best Management
- Kuk Harrell appears on behalf of Suga Wuga Music, Inc.
- Jeff "Supa Jeff" Villanueva appears on behalf of Trac-N-Field Entertainment

Recording locations

- Vocal recording – Burst HQ (Milwaukee, WI)
- Music recording – We the Best Studios (Miami, FL)
- Mixing – The Ninja Beat Club (Atlanta, GA)

Personnel

- Songwriting – Priscilla Renea, Alex Delicata, Jermaine Jackson, Andrew Harr, Robyn Fenty
- Production – The Runners
- Vocal production – Kuk Harrell
- Vocal recording – Kuk Harrell, Josh Gudwin, Marcos Tovar
- Assistant vocal recording – Kyle White
- Music recording – Jeff "Supa Jeff" Villanueva
- Mixing – Phil Tan
- Additional and assistant engineering – Damien Lewis
- Electric/acoustic guitars – Alex Delicata
- Bass – Eric England
- Background vocals – Priscilla Renea

== Charts ==
=== Weekly charts ===
Weekly chart performance
Chart (2011)	Peak position
Australia (ARIA)	4
Austria (Ö3 Austria Top 40)	4
Belgium (Ultratop 50 Flanders)	9
Belgium (Ultratop 50 Wallonia)	26
Brazil (Billboard Brasil Hot 100)	12
Brazil Hot Pop Songs	4
Canada Hot 100 (Billboard)	20
CIS Airplay (TopHit)	137
Croatia International Airplay (HRT)	1
Czech Republic Airplay (ČNS IFPI)	3
Denmark (Tracklisten)	30
Euro Digital Song Sales (Billboard)	10
France (SNEP)	30
Germany (GfK)	8
Hungary (Rádiós Top 40)	17
Ireland (IRMA)	11
Israel (Media Forest)	7
Italy (FIMI)	10
Luxembourg (Billboard)	6
Netherlands (Dutch Top 40)	9
Netherlands (Single Top 100)	19
New Zealand (Recorded Music NZ)	4
Poland Airplay (ZPAV)	1
Portugal (Billboard)	2
Romania (Romanian Top 100)	19
Scottish Singles Sales (Official Charts)	8
Slovakia Airplay (ČNS IFPI)	1
South Korea Foreign (Circle)	41
Sweden (Sverigetopplistan)	31
Switzerland (Schweizer Hitparade)	10
UK Singles (Official Charts)	8
UK Hip Hop/R&B (Official Charts)	3
Ukraine Airplay (TopHit)	69
US Billboard Hot 100	37
US Dance Club Songs (Billboard)	1
US Pop Airplay (Billboard)	18

=== Year-end charts ===
Year-end chart performance
Chart (2011)	Position
Australia (ARIA)	61
Austria (Ö3 Austria Top 40)	49
Belgium (Ultratop 50 Flanders)	71
Brazil (Crowley)	34
Canada (Canadian Hot 100)	90
Croatia International Airplay (HRT)	10
Germany (Official German Charts)	68
Italy (Musica e dischi)	39
Netherlands (Dutch Top 40)	55
Netherlands (Single Top 100)	80
New Zealand (Recorded Music NZ)	43
Sweden (Sverigetopplistan)	100
Switzerland (Schweizer Hitparade)	59
UK Singles (OCC)	79
Ukraine Airplay (TopHit)	147
US Dance Club Songs (Billboard)	47

== Certifications ==
Certifications
Region	Certification	Certified units/sales
Australia (ARIA)	4× Platinum	280,000^{‡}
Brazil (Pro-Música Brasil)	Diamond	250,000^{‡}
Denmark (IFPI Danmark)	Gold	45,000^{‡}
Germany (BVMI)	Gold	150,000^{‡}
Italy (FIMI)	Platinum	30,000^{*}
Japan (RIAJ)	Gold	100,000^{*}
New Zealand (RMNZ)	Gold	7,500^{*}
Sweden (GLF)	Platinum	40,000^{‡}
Switzerland (IFPI Switzerland)	Gold	15,000^{^}
United Kingdom (BPI)	Platinum	600,000^{‡}
United States (RIAA)	2× Platinum	2,000,000^{‡}
^{*} Sales figures based on certification alone.^{^} Shipments figures based on certification alone.^{‡} Sales+streaming figures based on certification alone.

== Release history ==
Release dates and formats
Region	Date	Format(s)	Version	Label(s)	Ref.
Denmark	May 13, 2011	Digital download	Original	Island Def Jam	
France	May 13, 2011	Digital download	Original	Island Def Jam	
Italy	May 13, 2011	Digital download	Original	Island Def Jam	
Italy	May 13, 2011	Radio airplay	Original	Universal	
Netherlands	May 13, 2011	Digital download	Original	Island Def Jam	
Sweden	May 13, 2011	Digital download	Original	Island Def Jam	
United States	May 16, 2011	Adult contemporary radio; hot adult contemporary radio; modern adult contemporary radio	Original	Island Def Jam	
United States	May 30, 2011	Contemporary hit radio	Original	Def Jam; Island Def Jam	
Germany	June 24, 2011	CD	2-track	Universal	
United States	July 19, 2011	Digital download	Remixes	Island Def Jam	

== See also ==
- List of number-one pop hits of 2011 (Brazil)
- List of Billboard Dance Club Songs number ones of 2011
- List of number-one singles of 2011 (Poland)
