= Rude Boy (Rihanna song) =

2010 single by Rihanna

Single by Rihanna

from the album Rated R
- Released: February 5, 2010
- Recorded: 2009
- Studio: Metropolis (London, England)
- Genre: Dancehall; Electro-R&B
- Length: 3:43
- Label: Def Jam; SRP
- Songwriters: Robyn Fenty; Mikkel S. Eriksen; Tor Erik Hermansen; Esther Dean; Makeba Riddick; Rob Swire
- Producers: Stargate; Rob Swire

Rihanna singles chronology
"Wait Your Turn" (2009)	"Rude Boy" (2010)	"Rockstar 101" (2010)

Music video
- "Rude Boy" on YouTube

"Rude Boy" is a song by Barbadian singer Rihanna, taken from her fourth studio album, Rated R (2009). It was released as the album's fourth overall and third international single on February 5, 2010, through Def Jam. Rihanna co-wrote the song with Ester Dean, Makeba Riddick, and producers Rob Swire and Stargate. "Rude Boy" is a clubby midtempo dancehall and R&B song which incorporates elements of raggamuffin. The song received mixed to positive reviews from critics; some have called it the highlight of the album, while others criticized Rihanna's "monotone" and "icy" vocal performance. However, opinion of the song has improved over time, and several critics have retrospectively ranked it as one of the strongest releases in her discography.

"Rude Boy" peaked at number one on the US Billboard Hot 100 for five consecutive weeks and was Rihanna's sixth US number-one single. It was a commercial success globally, peaking at number one in Australia and attained top five positions in Germany, Hungary, Ireland, New Zealand, Norway, Poland, Slovakia, and the United Kingdom. The accompanying music video was directed by Melina Matsoukas, used green screen techniques and featured props that included a stuffed lion and zebra. Rihanna performed the song live for the first time at the Pepsi Super Bowl Fan Jam in South Beach, Miami, and later on The Ellen DeGeneres Show, and Alan Carr: Chatty Man. "Rude Boy" was also featured on the set lists of Rihanna's Last Girl on Earth, Loud, Diamonds and Anti tours. In 2023, Rihanna performed the song at the Super Bowl LVII halftime show, whereupon it resurged in popularity and went viral on social media as a dance challenge.

== Background and development ==
"Rude Boy" was produced by Rob Swire and Stargate who co-wrote the song with Rihanna, Ester Dean, and Makeba Riddick. During an interview on the television show, Alan Carr: Chatty Man in February 2010, Carr asked Rihanna about the song's lyrics, with particular emphasis on the line "Come here rude boy, boy, can you get it up?/Come here rude boy, boy, is you big enough?" Rihanna explained: "When we wrote the song, it was kind of a freestyle ... I liked the West Indian influence that the music had, and, I just went in the booth, they were already jotting down some ideas and, that came to me, I just ran in there with one of the writers and started coming up with this in the studio and now when people read it back to me like that, 'Come here rude boy, is you big enough'?, it does sound so disgusting!" She also explained the development of the song, and said that those lyrics were originally going to be the introduction, but because of the song's infectious beat, Rihanna decided to make it the hook instead.

In an interview with Us Weekly, Makeba Riddick, who assisted with the song's vocal production, spoke about the inspiration for the song. Riddick explained that Ester Dean had come up with a concept for the song, and had been working with Stargate to develop it. Upon hearing it, Riddick and Rihanna expressed interest in the song but thought that some changes were needed, and sent it to Riddick for completion. Riddick also explained where the idea for some of the sexually provocative lyrics came from: "I was listening to the words and me and [Rihanna] and we were just laughing and talking about so many situations that have happened in the past and that happen to women everywhere. By the time we were done of course, we were laughing and giggling about the lyrics – surprisingly everybody went nuts over the song." Dean explained the development of "Rude Boy" in an interview with The Boom Box, and said that she wanted to channel Rihanna's alter ego and use it as inspiration for the song's lyrics. Dean praised Rihanna's ability to take risks with her music, saying "I think Rihanna is sexy and will say things that other chicks won't say. Even if she says let's go kiss some girls, who really cares ... that's Rihanna. Music is about fantasy. This is what people want to do, but are afraid to do." In an interview with Entertainment Weekly, Stargate revealed that Rihanna had come up with the title and concept for the song herself, and communicated her ideas to Dean, who wrote a rough draft. After the song was completed, it was nearly left off the album's track list since it was not as dark as the other material on the album. However, Rihanna loved the record and fought for it to both be included on the album and released as a single. Stargate also revealed that "Rude Boy" was one of the first mainstream songs to fuse slower hip-hop beats with EDM instrumentation, kicking off a trend that was seen in subsequent releases from other artists.

== Composition ==
"Rude Boy"
A 22-second sample of "Rude Boy", demonstrating the meld of West Indian, dancehall and ragga music influences.

"Rude Boy" is a dancehall and R&B song which incorporates elements of raggamuffin. The song is written in the key of E minor (recorded in E♭ minor) with a time signature in common time and a tempo of 87 beats per minute. Rihanna's vocal range spans from the low note of E_{3} to the high note of D_{5}, and the song follows a sequence of Em−Bm−C−Am−Bm as its chord progression. Alexis Petridis of The Guardian commented that "Rude Boy", and the album's previous single "Hard", were the highlights of Rated R, praised the singer's vocal performance in the song, "both of which exploit Rihanna's most appealing vocal style, a sulky, icy, monotone." Michael Menachem of Billboard commented on the lyrical content of the song, and wrote, "with 'Rude Boy', Rihanna delivers her most provocative lyrics and perhaps most authentic-sounding single to date." Menachem also wrote about the song's composition, "Steel drums are a welcome presence on the production, which gives a nod to ska and dancehall. Rihanna's swagger has never been as convincing as on this song."

== Release ==
"Rude Boy" was released as the fourth overall single (third international) from Rated R (2009). It was sent to urban radio stations in the US on February 9, 2010, and was released via digital download on February 19, 2010.

== Critical reception ==
Los Angeles Times' reviewer Ann Powers stated that the song has a "ragamuffin-style", and commented on the lyrics, "Even as she offers herself in no uncertain terms—'I'm gon' let you be the captain tonight' she sneers—she questions his prowess. 'Can you get it up? Are you big enough?' she repeats in the singsong chorus, making it tough to imagine that any suitor could rise to this occasion." Bill Lamb of About.com praised the song, and called it "the most instantly engaging song from the album Rated R", and that "[Rihanna] projects a dominant female image that is exactly what was needed to move past the unfortunate Chris Brown chapter in her career". However, Lamb added that the "icy feel is wearing thin. Rihanna sounds like she has taken a few steps back to distance herself from the whole song. There is a pleasing swagger, but we're never quite engaged".

Nick Levine of Digital Spy, commenting on the genre of the song and Rihanna's musical direction and transition from her previous album Good Girl Gone Bad (2007), wrote that the song "can be construed as a winning synthesis of her Island-pop beginnings, the effortless hitmaking of the Good Girl Gone Bad era and the more menacing persona she's unveiled post-Grammygate. On the other, it's just a damn good tune." Levine also wrote that "Rude Boy" is "the most instantly catchy moment" on Rated R. Alibhe Malone of NME commented on the song's demeanor in relation to Rated R as a whole, and wrote, "With only one other female songwriter here apart from Rihanna (Ester Dean on 'Rude Boy') it's a startlingly masculine record – in sound and in attitude." Malone also wrote that Rihanna persists in ensuring that listener realizes "how she wants men in her bed." Ryan Dombell of Pitchfork Media wrote a mixed review of the song; he called it the flightiest song on Rated R, but praised it as superior to the riskier material on the album.

Multiple publications have gone on to retrospectively review "Rude Boy" as one of the best songs in Rihanna's catalog, praising its sound as both innovative and enjoyable.

== Chart performance ==
"Rude Boy" debuted on the US Billboard Hot 100 at number sixty-four. It peaked at number one a month later, replacing "Break Your Heart" by Taio Cruz, and became Rihanna's sixth US number one single. Rihanna equaled Paula Abdul and Diana Ross as the female artists with the fifth-most number one singles on the Hot 100's in its fifty-one year history. "Rude Boy" remained at number one for five consecutive weeks, and was replaced by "Nothin' On You" by B.o.B featuring Bruno Mars. "Rude Boy" also topped the US Rhythmic Airplay, Pop Songs, and Dance Club Songs charts. "Rude Boy" was certified quintuple platinum by the Recording Industry Association of America and has sold over 3 million copies in the United States as of June 2015. "Rude Boy" debuted on the Australian Singles Chart at number forty-five, and peaked at number one for two weeks in March 2010. It remained on the chart for nineteen weeks, and was certified two-times platinum by the Australian Recording Industry Association, denoting shipments of over 140,000 copies. In New Zealand, the song debuted at number twenty-five on February 22, 2010, and peaked at number three in its fifth week on the chart.

On the UK Singles Chart, "Rude Boy" peaked at number two. It was prevented from reaching the top spot by Tinie Tempah's "Pass Out", which debuted at number one and remained there for two weeks. "Rude Boy" was more successful on the UK R&B Chart, where it peaked at number one for one week on February 27, 2010. On February 13, 2026, the single was certified triple platinum by the British Phonographic Industry, denoting shipments of over 1,800,000 copies. Elsewhere in Europe, the song achieved great chart success, peaking at number three in Denmark and Norway for two weeks on both charts, and in both the Flanders and Wallonia regions of Belgium. "Rude Boy" also reached the top ten in Austria, Finland and France, both of first countries charting at numbers six, and eight for the latter, respectively. "Rude Boy" was slightly a little less successful in Sweden, where the song peaked at number eleven.

== Music video ==
=== Background and synopsis ===
Rihanna is shown wearing a skin tight black and white catsuit, sitting on a stuffed zebra, with a black and white background. The scene from the video draws influence from paintings by the 1980s pop culture artist Keith Haring, who was famous for using graffiti patterns in his artwork.

The accompanying music video for "Rude Boy" was directed by Melina Matsoukas, who also directed the video for Rihanna's previous single, "Hard" and was shot in January 2010 in Hollywood, Los Angeles, California. The video relies upon the use of greenscreen, and contains strong references to critically acclaimed famous artists, including Andy Warhol, Keith Haring, Salt-n-Pepa, M.I.A. and Jean-Michel Basquiat. In an interview with Carson Daly on his radio show, Amp Radio, Rihanna described the video as "completely different from any other video" she had done before and "pretty freakin' cool". She explained its artistic qualities, and said, "A lot of my videos are really dark and edgy and tough. 'Rude Boy' is more playing along the lines from my roots. We used a lot of color, but also the costumes were very Jamaican dance-hall-queen type." The video premiered on February 10, 2010, via the high-definition music video provider Vevo.

The video features Rihanna in a multitude of vibrant, brightly colored, Caribbean-inspired scenes. In the opening scene, Rihanna approaches a drum kit, which she plays as the song progresses. During the rest of the video, Rihanna engages with a male extra and plays with a variety of props, including a zebra, a motorcycle and a stuffed lion; these scenes are intercut with scenes of Rihanna playing the drum kit. Rihanna wears different outfits in the video, including a golden net bodysuit and a zebra-printed catsuit, which she wears while sitting atop a stuffed zebra. Rihanna performs various 1990s dancehall moves, such as the Bogle.

=== Reception and accolades ===
Upon the video's release, several media outlets noticed a resemblance between the colorful aesthetics of "Rude Boy" and those of British singer-songwriter and rapper M.I.A.'s video "Boyz". Melina Matsoukas responded to the allegations that she had copied the idea, and said, "Afterward I was like, 'Oh, this sucks. They tore down my video ... [M.I.A.'s] video's great too. It definitely wasn't trying to rip anybody off at all, it was just our approach and the animation stuff, it had a similar vibe." Matsoukas explained that the inspiration for the video did not come from one particular source, but from a variety of pop culture icons. She concluded, "We're all inspired by similar elements and it came together in that way." Several critics noticed the differences between Rihanna's previous singles, "Russian Roulette" and "Hard", and that "Rude Boy" had adopted a care-free and brighter image. Becky Bain of Idolator also noticed the similarities between M.I.A.'s video "Boyz" and "Rude Boy", and wrote, "We're digging the reggae-inflected jam, although the Bob Marley-meets-M.I.A. color explosion becomes a little hard on the eyes after awhile." Bain said the video "is colorful, loud, vibrant, and a complete departure from the mostly depressing captivity scenarios and over-the-top war imagery of the previous videos from her Rated R singles." Simon Vozick-Levinson of Entertainment Weekly also commented on the vibrancy of the video and its resemblance to M.I.A.'s video, "It's a wild explosion of clashing colors, bold block lettering, and shaky camerawork. As many observers instantly pointed out, it all owes more than a little to the aesthetic of M.I.A.—which, if you ask me, is not a bad thing at all." Jocelyn Vena of MTV commented on the change of visual direction in the video, calling it "a colorful departure from the dark fare previously released from her Rated R album." Vena also wrote about the stylization of the video's content with regard to Rihanna's heritage. She wrote that the video is infused with "a kaleidoscope of prints and colors, embracing her roots in Caribbean dance-hall-inspired costumes."

"Rude Boy" won the award for Most Performed Song at the 2011 ASCAP Pop Music Awards and the Award Winning Songs award at the 2011 BMI Urban Awards. The song was also won three awards at the 2011 Barbados Music Awards in the Best Pop/R&B Single, Music Video of the Year and Song of the Year categories. "Rude Boy" was nominated in the 'Best Editing' category at the 2010 MTV Video Music Awards, but lost to Lady Gaga's "Bad Romance".

Sean Kingston and Detail released a cover version of the song, titled "Rude Girl". DJ Earworm used "Rude Boy" in his mash-up of the top 25 songs of 2010 titled "United State of Pop 2010 (Don't Stop the Pop)". He also used "Rude Boy" in his mash-up "Like OMG Baby", designed for the 2010 Capital FM Summertime Ball Concert where Rihanna performed.

== Live performances ==
To promote the song as the third US single from Rated R, Rihanna performed "Rude Boy" live for the first time at the Pepsi Super Bowl Fan Jam on VH1 in South Beach, Miami, on February 4, 2010. The set also included "Russian Roulette" and "Hard", both from Rated R On February 2, 2010, Rihanna performed five songs for "AOL Music Sessions", which were made available to view on the AOL website on February 23, 2010. The set included "Rude Boy", "Russian Roulette", "Hard", "Take a Bow" and a stripped-down version of "Disturbia". The singer also performed the song on The Ellen DeGeneres Show, which aired on February 15, 2010.

To promote the song's release as a single in the UK, Rihanna made a recorded appearance on Alan Carr: Chatty Man on February 24, 2010, which was broadcast the following day. The singer wore a crop-top, "bizarre oversized" shorts, an "unusual" hairnet, and large, golden, hooped earrings. Rihanna also demonstrated the dance moves which are featured in the video, including the bogle, the butterfly, and the Dutty Wine, which she taught to the show's host. "Rude Boy" was also performed on GMTV the following day, where Rihanna also gave a short interview. Rihanna performed "Rude Boy" at the ECHO Awards in Berlin, Germany, on March 4, 2010. Rihanna shared the stage with two larger-than-life mechanical robots, which interacted with her throughout the performance.

"Rude Boy" has been a staple of Rihanna's live performances and concert tours. On March 27, 2010, Rihanna performed "Rude Boy" as part of a medley with "Hard" and "Don't Stop the Music" at the 2010 Nickelodeon Kids' Choice Awards, held at UCLA's Pauley Pavilion in Westwood, California. The performance featured a large camouflage tank and two robots similar to those used for her performance at the ECHO Awards. On May 23, 2010, Rihanna performed a 40-minute set at BBC Radio 1's Big Weekend Music Festival in Bangor, Wales. She performed several of her biggest hits, which included "Mad House", "Hard", "Disturbia", "Rude Boy", "Te Amo", "Russian Roulette", "Don't Stop the Music", "SOS", and "Umbrella". The song was featured on Rihanna's Last Girl on Earth Tour. "Rude Boy" was also on the set-list of her Loud Tour, where Rihanna wore a denim bra and high waisted shorts. This performance was received far more positively than that of her previous tour, and critics praised the production of the concert. Jane Stevenson of the Toronto Sun wrote, "the two-hour, larger-than-life show lived up to the billing." Rihanna performed "Rude Boy" at Radio 1's Hackney Weekend on May 24, 2012, as the seventh song on the set list. She also performed the song at the 2016 MTV Video Music Awards in a medley with What's My Name? and Work. She would perform a baile funk remix of song as part of her set during the halftime show of Super Bowl LVII, causing the song to then go viral on TikTok as a dance challenge.

== Track listing ==
- Digital download
1. "Rude Boy" – 3:43
2. "Rude Boy" (instrumental version) – 3:43
- Digital download (TC remix)
1. "Rude Boy" (TC remix) – 4:18
- Digital download
1. "Rude Boy" (Chew Fu bumbaclot fix radio edit) - 4:06
2. "Rude Boy" (Chew Fu Vitamin S Fix) - 5:41
3. "Rude Boy" (Low Sunday "Rude Boy" radio edit) - 3:22
4. "Rude Boy" (Chew Fu bumbaclot fix extended) - 6:37
5. "Rude Boy" (Jonathan Peters club banger) - 7:07
6. "Rude Boy" (Low Sunday "Rude Boy" club) - 6:30
7. "Rude Boy" (Jonathan Peters dub banger) - 6:48
- Digital download (Wideboys Stadium radio mix)
1. "Rude Boy" (Wideboys Stadium radio mix) – 3:18
2. "Rude Boy" – 3:43

== Credits and personnel ==
Credits adapted from the liner notes of Rated R.

- Rihanna – songwriting, vocals
- Stargate – songwriting, production, instruments, programming
- Ester Dean – songwriting, concept, melody, lyrics
- Makeba Riddick – songwriting
- Rob Swire – songwriting, background vocals, instruments, programming
- Matthew Laderman - The “Rude Boy”
- Ross Parkin – assistant recorder
- Makeba Riddick – vocal production
- Kevin "KD" Davis – mixing at Chung King Studio, New York City
- Anthony Palazzole – assistant mixer
- Marcos Tovar – recording at Metropolis Studio, London

== Charts ==
=== Weekly charts ===
Weekly chart performance
Chart (2010)	Peak position
Australia (ARIA)	1
Austria (Ö3 Austria Top 40)	6
Belgium (Ultratop 50 Flanders)	3
Belgian Airplay (Ultratop Flanders)	2
Belgium (Ultratop 50 Wallonia)	3
Canada Hot 100 (Billboard)	7
CIS Airplay (TopHit)	57
Croatian International Airplay (HRT)	2
Czech Republic Airplay (ČNS IFPI)	4
Denmark (Tracklisten)	3
Europe (European Hot 100 Singles)	2
Finland (Suomen virallinen lista)	6
France (SNEP)	8
Germany (GfK)	4
Hungary (Single Top 40)	3
Ireland (IRMA)	3
Israel International Airplay (Media Forest)	1
Italy (FIMI)	8
Luxembourg (Billboard)	4
Mexico (Billboard Mexican Airplay)	7
Netherlands (Dutch Top 40)	9
Netherlands (Single Top 100)	15
New Zealand (Recorded Music NZ)	3
Norway (VG-lista)	3
Poland Airplay (ZPAV)	4
Poland Dance (ZPAV)	23
Poland (Video Chart)	1
Romania TV Airplay (Media Forest)	1
Russia Airplay (TopHit)	90
Scottish Singles Sales (Official Charts)	3
Slovakia Airplay (ČNS IFPI)	2
Spain (Promusicae)	10
Sweden (Sverigetopplistan)	11
Switzerland (Schweizer Hitparade)	5
UK Singles (Official Charts)	2
UK Hip Hop/R&B (Official Charts)	1
US Billboard Hot 100	1
US Adult Top 40 (Billboard)	32
US Dance Club Songs (Billboard)	1
US Hot R&B/Hip-Hop Songs (Billboard)	2
US Pop Airplay (Billboard)	1
US Rhythmic Airplay (Billboard)	1

2023 weekly chart performance
Chart (2023)	Peak position
Global 200 (Billboard)	152
US Digital Song Sales (Billboard)	28
US Hot Dance/Electronic Songs (Billboard)	7
US Hot R&B Songs (Billboard)	20

=== Monthly charts ===
Monthly chart performance
Chart (2010)	Position
Brazil (Brasil Hot 100 Airplay)	16
Brazil (Brasil Hot Pop Songs)	3

=== Year-end charts ===
Year-end chart performance
Chart (2010)	Position
Australia (ARIA)	33
Australia Hip-Hop/R&B Singles (ARIA)	12
Austria (Ö3 Austria Top 40)	60
Belgium (Ultratop 50 Flanders)	35
Belgium (Ultratop 50 Wallonia)	27
Brazil (Crowley)	24
Canada Hot 100 (Billboard)	38
Croatia International Airplay (HRT)	3
Denmark (Tracklisten)	42
Europe (European Hot 100 Singles)	24
France (SNEP)	55
Germany (Official German Charts)	67
Ireland (IRMA)	20
Italy (FIMI)	49
Italy Airplay (EarOne)	57
Netherlands (Dutch Top 40)	38
Netherlands (Single Top 100)	95
New Zealand (Recorded Music NZ)	34
Romania (Romanian Top 100)	20
Sweden (Sverigetopplistan)	77
Switzerland (Schweizer Hitparade)	41
UK Singles (Official Charts)	14
US Billboard Hot 100	15
US Dance Club Songs (Billboard)	26
US Hot R&B/Hip-Hop Songs (Billboard)	25
US Pop Airplay (Billboard)	23
US Rhythmic Airplay (Billboard)	6

== Certifications ==
Certifications and sales
Region	Certification	Certified units/sales
Australia (ARIA)	8× Platinum	560,000^{‡}
Belgium (BRMA)	Gold	15,000^{*}
Brazil (Pro-Música Brasil)	3× Platinum	180,000^{‡}
Denmark (IFPI Danmark)	Platinum	90,000^{‡}
Germany (BVMI)	Gold	150,000^{‡}
Italy (FIMI)	Gold	15,000^{*}
New Zealand (RMNZ)	3× Platinum	90,000^{‡}
Switzerland (IFPI Switzerland)	Gold	15,000^{^}
Spain (Promusicae)	Gold	30,000^{‡}
United Kingdom (BPI)	3× Platinum	1,800,000^{‡}
United States (RIAA)	5× Platinum	5,000,000^{‡}
^{*} Sales figures based on certification alone.^{^} Shipments figures based on certification alone.^{‡} Sales+streaming figures based on certification alone.

== Release history ==
Release dates and formats
Region	Date	Format(s)	Version(s)	Label(s)	Ref.
Italy	February 5, 2010	Radio airplay	Original	Universal	
United States	February 9, 2010	Contemporary hit radio; rhythmic contemporary radio	Original	Def Jam; Island Def Jam	
Australia	February 19, 2010	Digital download	Original; instrumental	Island Def Jam	
Austria	February 19, 2010	Digital download	Original; instrumental	Island Def Jam	
Ireland	February 19, 2010	Digital download	Original; instrumental	Island Def Jam	
Italy	February 19, 2010	Digital download	Original; instrumental	Island Def Jam	
Netherlands	February 19, 2010	Digital download	Original; instrumental	Island Def Jam	
New Zealand	February 19, 2010	Digital download	Original; instrumental	Island Def Jam	
Germany	March 5, 2010	CD	Universal	Island Def Jam	
France	March 15, 2010	CD	Universal	Island Def Jam	

== See also ==
- List of Billboard Hot Dance Club Songs number ones of 2010
