= Rihanna videography =

Videos and media by Barbadian singer

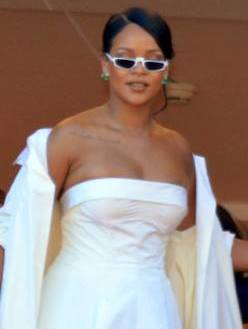
Rihanna at the Cannes Film Festival in 2017

Rihanna has released four video albums and appeared in 62 music videos, 12 films, 13 television programs, and several television commercials. In 2005, Rihanna signed a recording contract with Def Jam Recordings and released her debut single "Pon de Replay", taken from her first studio album Music of the Sun (2005). Like its lyrical theme, the music video for the song was inspired by disco and dance; it was directed by Little X. Three separate videos were released for "SOS", the lead single from her second studio album A Girl like Me (2006), all of which contained various dance sequences. The same year, American director Anthony Mandler directed the accompanying music video for the second single "Unfaithful", which featured Rihanna in a dangerous love triangle with her lover and her husband. "Unfaithful" was Rihanna's first collaboration with Mandler; they later worked together regularly. Also in 2006, Rihanna played herself in the third installment of the Bring It On film series, entitled Bring It On: All or Nothing.

The music video for "Umbrella", the lead single from her third studio album Good Girl Gone Bad (2007), was directed by Chris Applebaum and featured scenes of Rihanna naked and covered in silver paint. It won the Video of the Year accolade at the 2007 MTV Video Music Awards. Seven more singles, accompanied with separate music videos directed by Mandler, were released from the album. Rihanna flew to Europe to shoot the music videos for the 2007 singles "Shut Up and Drive" and "Don't Stop the Music" in Prague. "Russian Roulette", the lead single from Rihanna's fourth studio album Rated R (2009), featured a cameo appearance by American actor and model Jesse Williams. The music video for the second single, "Hard", was directed by Melina Matsoukas, who also directed the videos for Rihanna's 2010 singles, "Rude Boy" and "Rockstar 101". The same year, Rihanna provided vocals for Eminem's "Love the Way You Lie". The song's accompanying music video features actors Dominic Monaghan and Megan Fox in a love-hate relationship while Eminem and Rihanna perform in front of a burning house. In 2010, Rihanna also filmed the scenes for her second film appearance in Battleship, which was released in April 2012.

In 2011, three of Rihanna's videos met with criticism and controversy. The Matsoukas-directed music video for "S&M" (Loud, 2010) faced a lawsuit from American photographer David LaChapelle and was banned in eleven countries due to its sexual content. The Parents Television Council (PTC) criticized Rihanna for her "cold, calculated execution of murder" in the video for her 2011 single "Man Down". In September 2011, Rihanna released "We Found Love", the lead single from her sixth studio album, Talk That Talk; its music video caused controversy from some activist groups, including The Rape Crisis Centre in the UK. Christian youth pastors and the Ulster Cancer Foundation also criticized the video for Rihanna's portrayal of sexual intercourse while under the influence of illegal drugs, not being a role model to young girls and women and for smoking in the video. Despite the criticism, the video won the awards for Video of the Year at the 2012 MTV Video Music Awards and a Grammy Award for Best Short Form Music Video at the 55th Annual Grammy Awards. Mandler directed the video for "Diamonds", the lead single from Rihanna's seventh studio album Unapologetic. It depicts Rihanna in four environments that represent the elements of earth, air, water and fire.

== Music videos ==
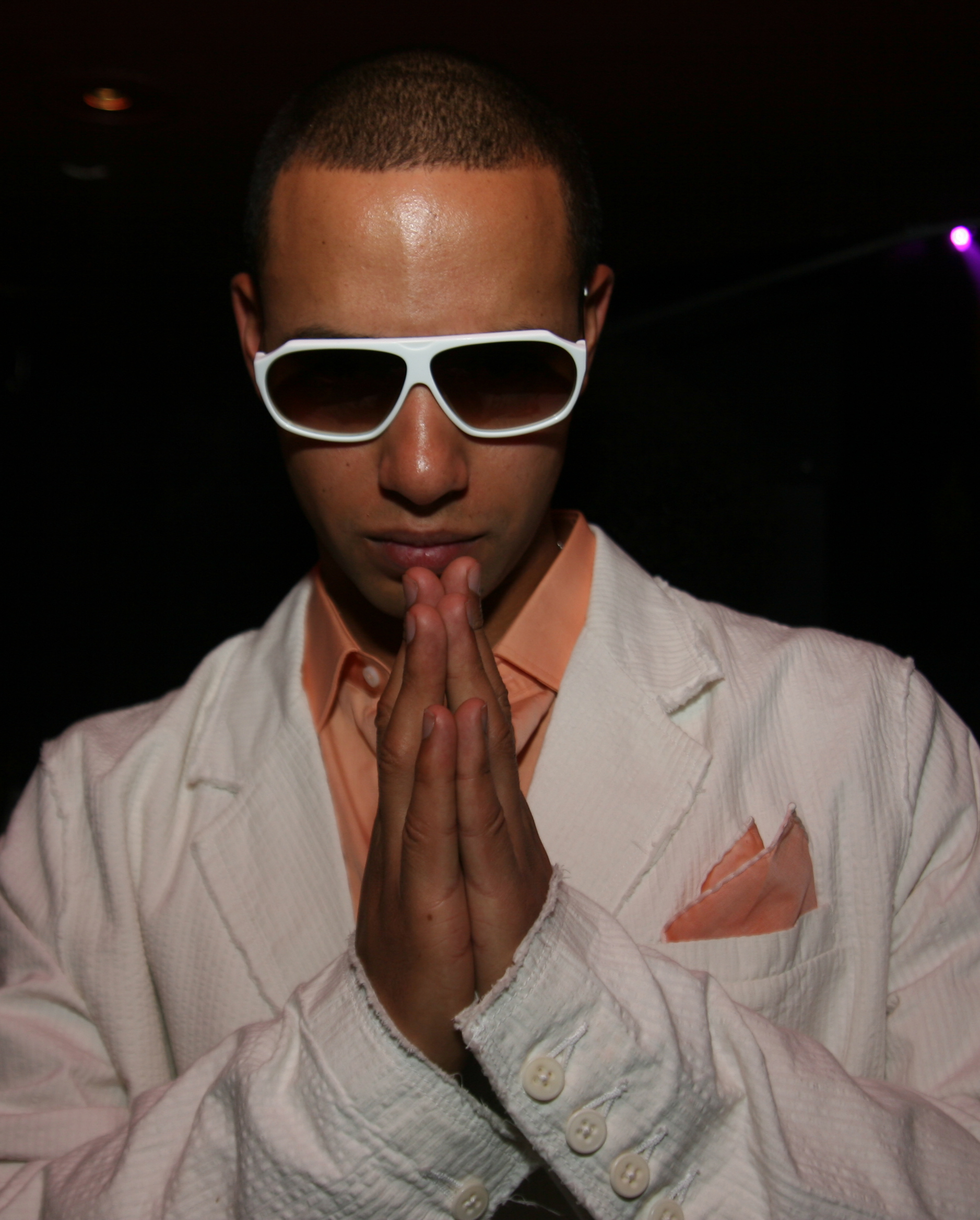
Canadian director Little X directed the music video for Rihanna's debut single "Pon de Replay".

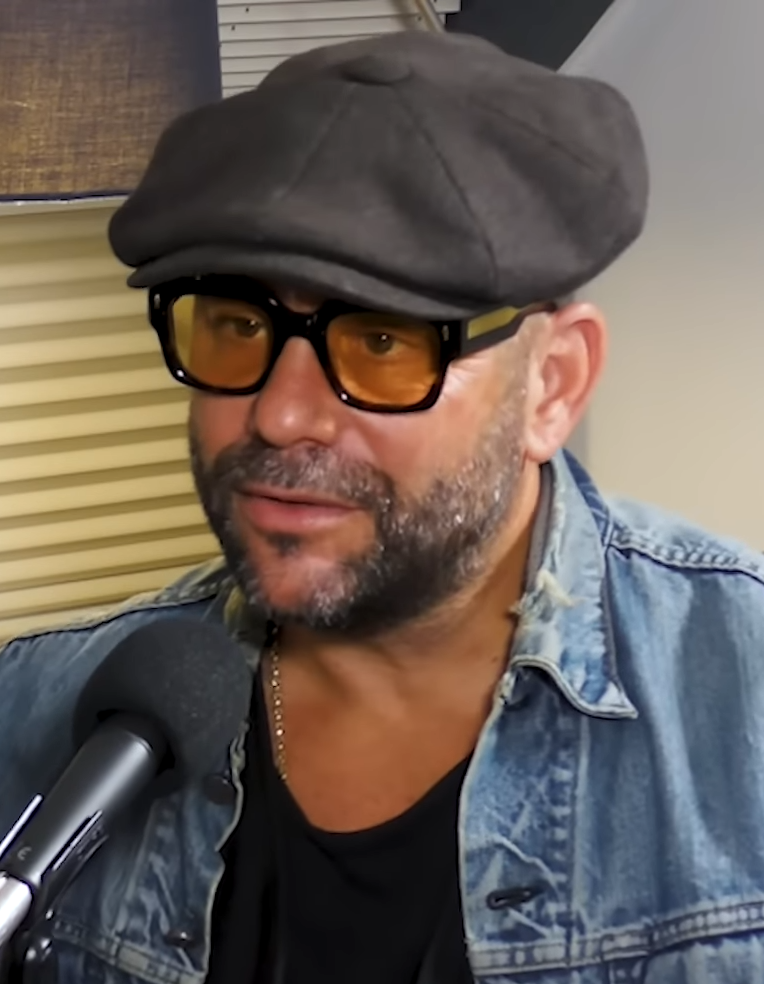
American director Anthony Mandler has been a staple collaborator of Rihanna's, directing 18 of her music videos.

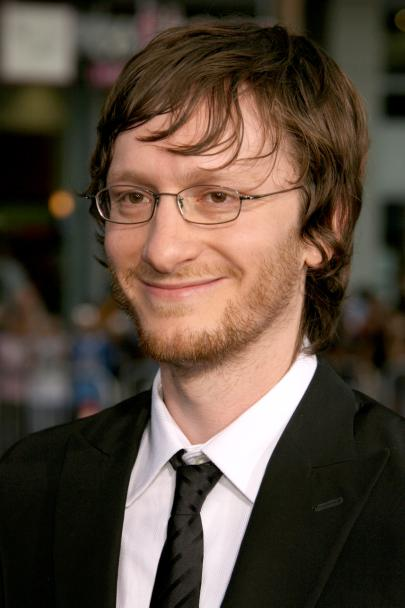
Akiva Schaffer directed the music videos for "Shy Ronnie" and "Shy Ronnie 2: Ronnie & Clyde".

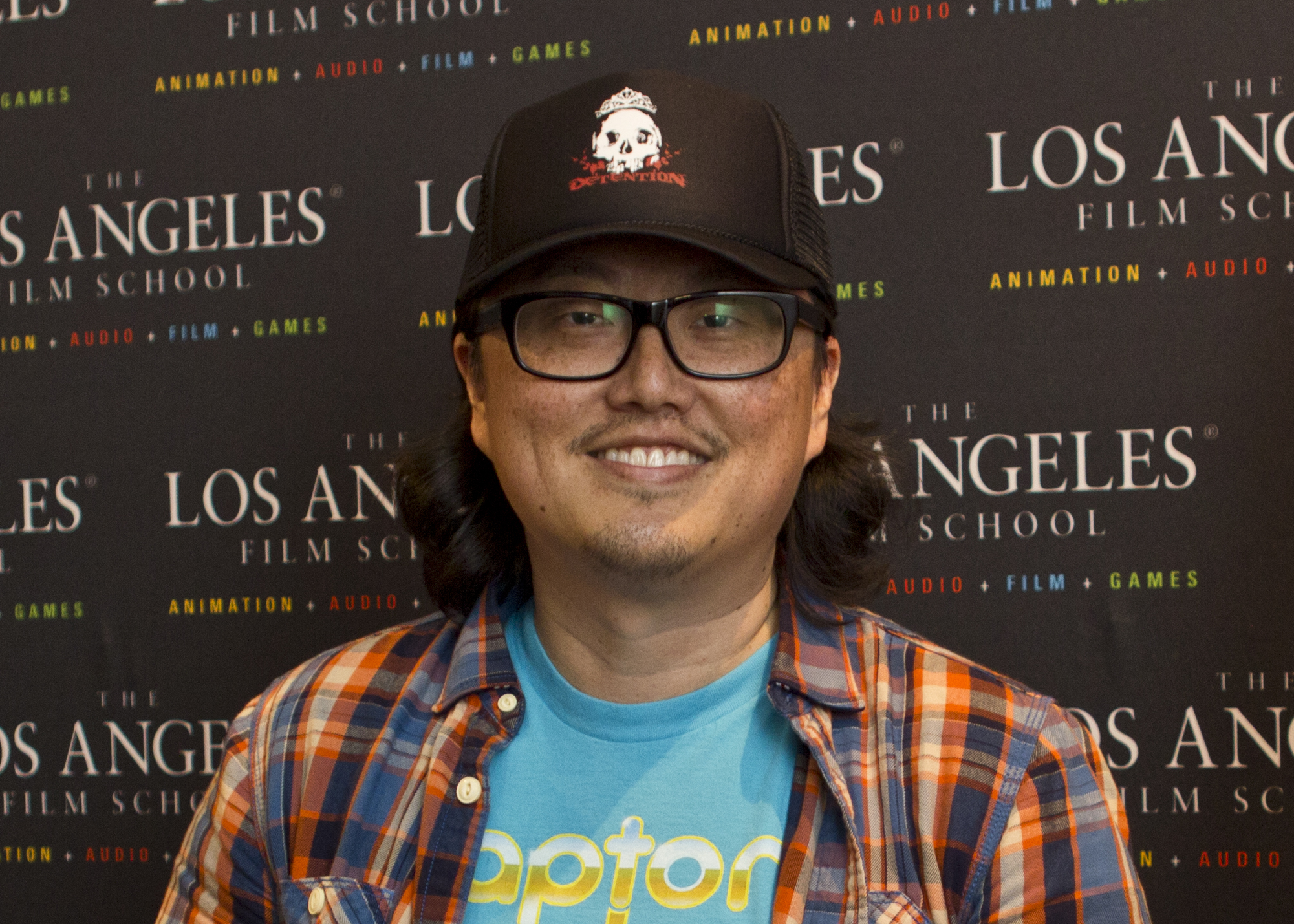
The music videos for Rihanna's collaborations with Eminem ("Love the Way You Lie") and Shakira ("Can't Remember to Forget You") were directed by Joseph Kahn.

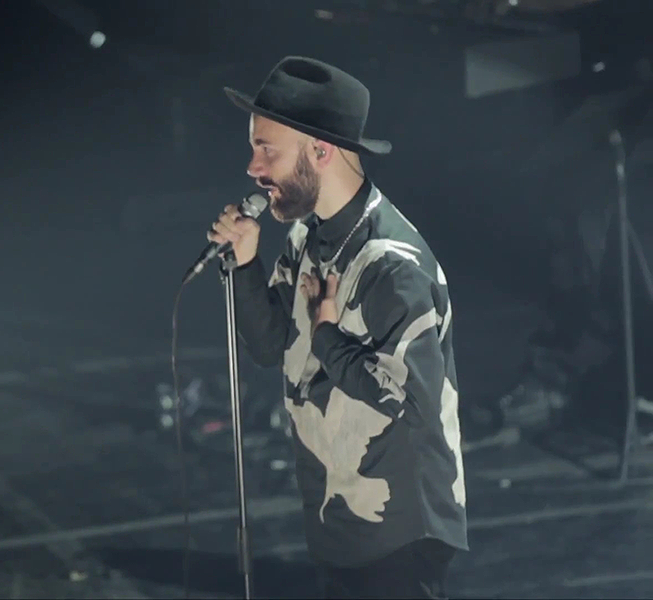
French director and singer-songwriter Yoann Lemoine directed the music video for the singer's collaboration with Drake, "Take Care".

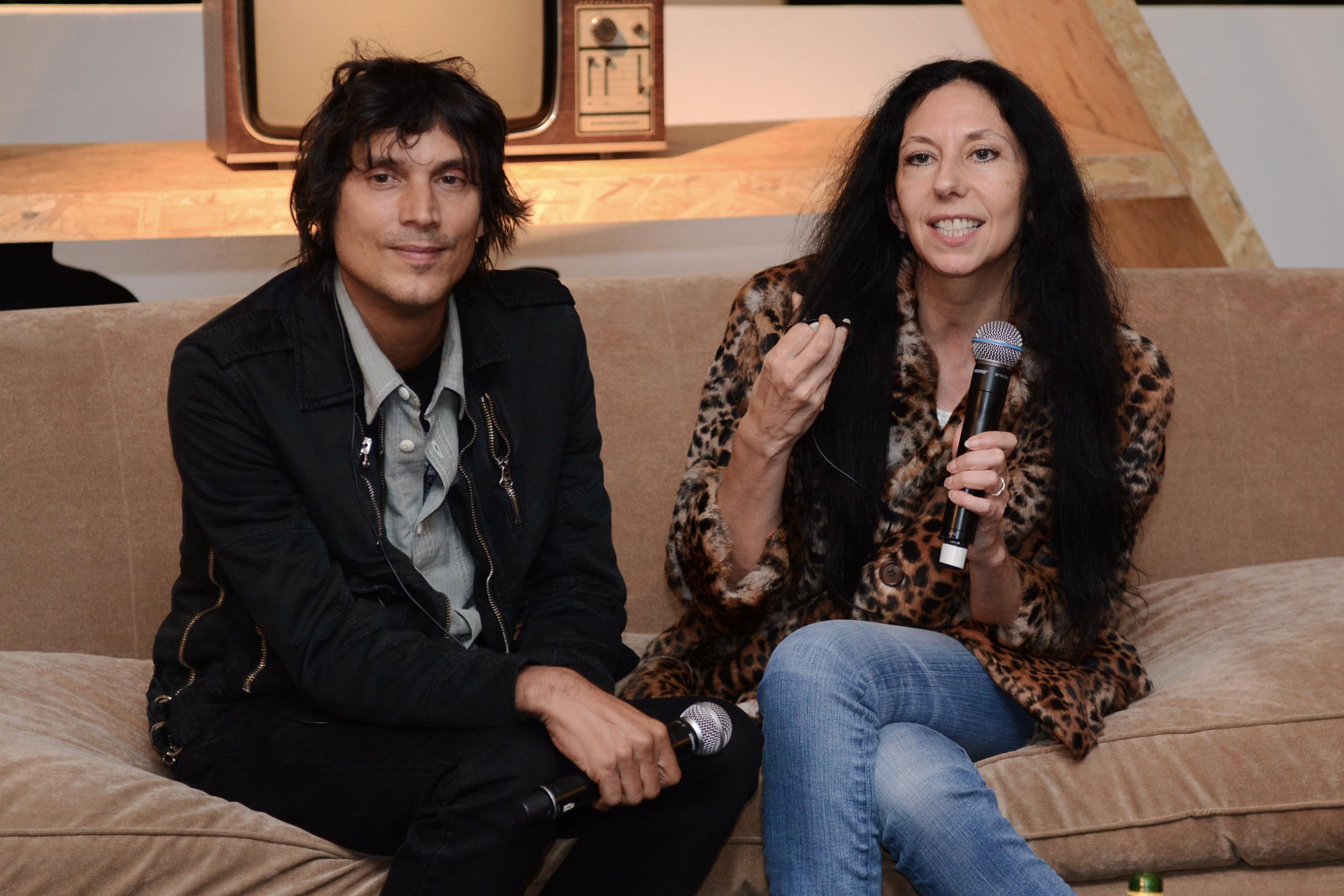
Dutch photographer duo Inez and Vinoodh directed the music video for "FourFiveSeconds"

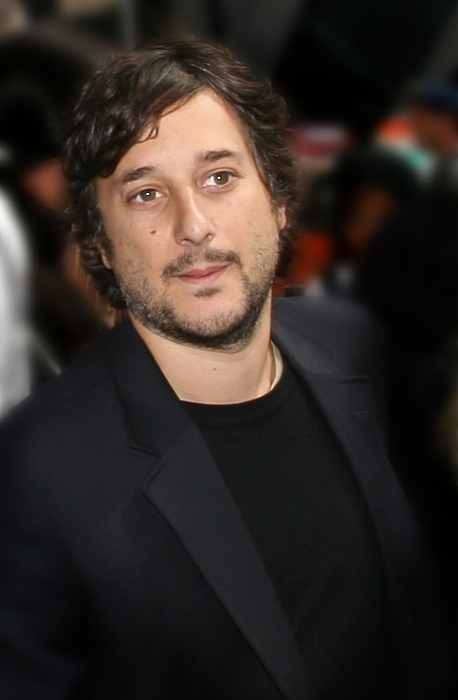
American filmmaker Harmony Korine has directed the video for Rihanna's 2016 single, "Needed Me".

=== As lead artist ===
List of music videos as lead artist, with other performers, directors, album title and showing year released
Title	Other performer(s)	Director(s)	Album	Year	Ref.
"Pon de Replay"	—N/a	Little X	Music of the Sun	2005	
"If It's Lovin' that You Want"	—N/a	Marcus Raboy	Music of the Sun	2005	
"SOS"	—N/a	Chris Applebaum	A Girl like Me	2006	
"SOS" (Nike version)	—N/a	Chris Applebaum	A Girl like Me	2006	
"Unfaithful"	—N/a	Anthony Mandler	A Girl like Me	2006	
"We Ride"	—N/a	Anthony Mandler	A Girl like Me	2006	
"Umbrella"	Jay-Z	Chris Applebaum	Good Girl Gone Bad	2007	
"Shut Up and Drive"	—N/a	Anthony Mandler	Good Girl Gone Bad	2007	
"Don't Stop the Music"	—N/a	Anthony Mandler	Good Girl Gone Bad	2007	
"Hate That I Love You"	Ne-Yo or David Bisbal	Anthony Mandler	Good Girl Gone Bad	2007	
"Take a Bow"	—N/a	Anthony Mandler	Good Girl Gone Bad: Reloaded	2008	
"Disturbia"	—N/a	Anthony Mandler	Good Girl Gone Bad: Reloaded	2008	
"Rehab"	Justin Timberlake	Anthony Mandler	Good Girl Gone Bad	2008	
"Wait Your Turn"	—N/a	Anthony Mandler	Rated R	2009	
"Russian Roulette"	—N/a	Anthony Mandler	Rated R	2009	
"Hard"	Young Jeezy	Melina Matsoukas	Rated R	2009	
"Rude Boy"	—N/a	Melina Matsoukas	Rated R	2010	
"Rockstar 101"	Slash	Melina Matsoukas	Rated R	2010	
"Te Amo"	—N/a	Anthony Mandler	Rated R	2010	
"Only Girl (In the World)"	—N/a	Anthony Mandler	Loud	2010	
"What's My Name?"	Drake	Philip Andelman	Loud	2010	
"S&M"	—N/a	Melina Matsoukas	Loud	2011	
"California King Bed"	—N/a	Anthony Mandler	Loud	2011	
"Man Down"	—N/a	Anthony Mandler	Loud	2011	
"Cheers (Drink to That)"	—N/a	Evan Rogers; Ciara Pardo	Loud	2011	
"We Found Love"	Calvin Harris	Melina Matsoukas	Talk That Talk	2011	
"You da One"	—N/a	Melina Matsoukas	Talk That Talk	2011	
"Where Have You Been"	—N/a	Dave Meyers	Talk That Talk	2012	
"Princess of China"	Coldplay	Adria Petty; Alan Bibby	Mylo Xyloto	2012	
"Diamonds"	—N/a	Anthony Mandler	Unapologetic	2012	
"Stay"	Mikky Ekko	Sophie Muller	Unapologetic	2013	
"Pour It Up"	—N/a	Robyn Fenty	Unapologetic	2013	
"What Now"	—N/a	Darren Craig; Jonathan Craven; Jeff Nicholas	Unapologetic	2013	
"FourFiveSeconds"	Kanye West; Paul McCartney	Inez & Vinoodh	—N/a	2015	
"American Oxygen"	—N/a	Darren Craig; Jonathan Craven; Jeff Nicholas	—N/a	2015	
"Bitch Better Have My Money"	—N/a	Robyn Fenty; Megaforce	—N/a	2015	
"Work"	Drake	Director X Tim Erem	Anti	2016	
"Kiss It Better"	—N/a	Craig McDean	Anti	2016	
"Needed Me"	—N/a	Harmony Korine	Anti	2016	
"Sledgehammer"	—N/a	Floria Sigismondi	Star Trek Beyond	2016	
"Lemon"	N.E.R.D	Todd Tourso; Scott Cudmore	No One Ever Really Dies	2017	
"Lift Me Up"	—N/a	Autumn Durald Arkapaw	Black Panther: Wakanda Forever	2022	

=== As featured artist ===
List of music videos as featured artist, with directors, album title and showing year released
Title	Performer(s)	Director(s)	Album	Year	Ref.
"Live Your Life"	T.I.	Anthony Mandler	Paper Trail	2008	
"If I Never See Your Face Again"	Maroon 5	Anthony Mandler	It Won't Be Soon Before Long; Good Girl Gone Bad: Reloaded	2008	
"Shy Ronnie"	The Lonely Island	Akiva Schaffer	—N/a	2009	
"Run This Town"	Jay-Z; Kanye West	Anthony Mandler	The Blueprint 3	2009	
"Love the Way You Lie"	Eminem	Joseph Kahn	Recovery	2010	
"Who's That Chick?" (Day and Night versions)	David Guetta	Jonas Åkerlund	One More Love	2010	
"Shy Ronnie 2: Ronnie & Clyde"	The Lonely Island	Akiva Schaffer	Turtleneck & Chain	2010	
"All of the Lights"	Kanye West; Kid Cudi	Hype Williams	My Beautiful Dark Twisted Fantasy	2011	
"Fly"	Nicki Minaj	Sanaa Hamri	Pink Friday	2011	
"Take Care"	Drake	Yoann Lemoine	Take Care	2012	
"The Monster"	Eminem	Rich Lee	The Marshall Mathers LP 2	2013	
"Can't Remember to Forget You"	Shakira	Joseph Kahn	Shakira	2014	
"Famous"	Kanye West	—N/a	The Life of Pablo	2016	
"This Is What You Came For"	Calvin Harris	Emil Nava	—N/a	2016	
"Wild Thoughts"	DJ Khaled; Bryson Tiller	Colin Tilley	Grateful	2017	
"Loyalty"	Kendrick Lamar	Dave Meyers & the little homies	Damn	2017	

=== Guest appearances ===
List of music videos as guest appearances, with directors, album title and showing year released
Title	Performer(s)	Director(s)	Album	Year	Ref.
"Like That"	Memphis Bleek; Swizz Beatz	R. Malcolm Jones	534	2006	
"Paranoid"	Kanye West; Mr Hudson	Nabil Elderkin	808s & Heartbreak	2009	
"Can't Get Enough"	J. Cole; Trey Songz	Clifton Bell	Cole World: The Sideline Story	2011	
"Fashion Killa"	A$AP Rocky	A$AP Rocky, Virgil Abloh	Long. Live. ASAP	2013	
"Gangstas Don't Live That Long"	Snoop Dogg	Dah Dah	That's My Work Volume 3	2014	
"Plain Jane"	A$AP Ferg	Hidji	Still Striving	2017	
"D.M.B."	A$AP Rocky	A$AP Rocky	Don't Be Dumb	2022	

== Video albums ==
Title	Album details	Certifications
Good Girl Gone Bad Live	Released: June 9, 2008; Label: Def Jam, SRP; Formats: Blu-ray, digital download, DVD	ARIA: Platinum; RIAA: Gold
Good Girl Gone Bad: The Videos	Released: December 12, 2008; Label: Island Def Jam; Format: Digital download	
Loud Tour Live at the O2	Released: December 13, 2012; Label: Def Jam, SRP; Formats: Blu-ray, digital download, DVD	ABPD: Gold
Rihanna 777 Documentary... 7Countries7Days7Shows	Released: May 7, 2013; Label: Def Jam, SRP; Formats: Digital download, DVD	ABPD: Gold

== Film ==
Appearances by Rihanna in motion pictures
Film	Year	Director	Character	Description
Bring It On: All or Nothing	2006	Steve Rash	Herself	Cameo appearance
Battleship	2012	Peter Berg	Petty Officer Cora Raikes	Rihanna stars in the film as a weapons specialist aboard a navy ship who fights aliens on the coast of Hawaii.
Katy Perry: Part of Me	2012	Dan Cutforth & Jane Lipsitz	Herself	Cameo appearance
Live 2012	2012	Paul Dugdale	Herself	Cameo appearance
This Is the End	2013	Evan Goldberg & Seth Rogen	Herself	The comedy action film features several celebrities attending a party at James Franco's house, while The Apocalypse breaks out.
Annie	2014	Will Gluck	Moon Goddess	Cameo appearance
Home	2015	Tim Johnson	Gratuity “Tip” Tucci	An animated film based on the book The True Meaning of Smekday by Adam Rex. The film features friendly aliens invading the Earth and using it as a hideout from their enemies. Voice role
Popstar: Never Stop Never Stopping	2016	Akiva Schaffer & Jorma Taccone	Herself	Cameo appearance
Valerian and the City of a Thousand Planets	2017	Luc Besson	Bubble	The film is based on a French graphic novel set in the 28th century.
Ocean's 8	2018	Gary Ross	Nine Ball	The film is both a continuation and a spin-off from Steven Soderbergh's Ocean's trilogy and features an all-female ensemble cast.
Guava Island	2019	Hiro Murai	Kofi	Lead role in Amazon Studios film, produced by Childish Gambino and marketed through his set at Coachella Festival in 2019
Smurfs	2025	Chris Miller	Smurfette	Main role, voice role, also producer

== Television ==
Appearances by Rihanna on television
Television show	Year	Character	Description
Las Vegas	2005	Herself	"The Real McCoy" (season 3: episode 6)
My Super Sweet 16	2006	Herself	"Darnell" (season 3: episode 7)
All My Children	2006	Herself	(episode of July 25)
Punk'd	2006	Herself	(season 7: episode 8)
Saturday Night Live	2009; 2010; 2012; 2015	Herself	"Blake Lively/Rihanna" (season 35: episode 8) "Jon Hamm/Rihanna" (season 36: episode 5) "Eli Manning/Rihanna" (season 37: episode 20) "Anne Hathaway/Rihanna" (season 38: episode 7) "Louis C.K./Rihanna" (season 40: episode 21)
Chelsea Lately	2011	Herself	(episode of March 10)
Extreme Makeover: Home Edition	2011	Herself	"The Jubilee House/Marshall Family" (season 9: episode 1)
The X Factor	2011	Herself	Guest judge (season 1, episodes 7, 8 and 9)
Styled to Rock	2012	Herself	Executive producer
Oprah's Next Chapter	2012	Herself	"Rihanna" (season 2: episode 1)
Styled to Rock	2013	Herself	Executive producer
The Voice	2015	Herself	Contestant mentor (The Knockouts round; season 9)
Bates Motel	2017	Marion Crane	Recurring role (season 5)
Victoria's Secret: Angels and Demons	2022	Herself	Episode: "Part Three: Tarnished Angels" (archive footage); Television documentary series
Power Book II: Ghost	2023	Herself	Episode: "Land of Lies" (archive footage)
