= Rogue by Rihanna =

2013 fragrance by Rihanna

Rogue

Fragrance by Rihanna
- Released: Fall 2013
- Label: Parlux Frargances
- Tagline: Push Boundaries. Be Bold. Go Rogue.
- Predecessor: Nude
- Successor: RiRi

Rogue is the fourth fragrance released by Barbadian singer Rihanna. The fragrance was released in two installments; firstly a women's fragrance and finally a men's cologne. The women's fragrance was officially released on September 4, 2013 under the perfume line, Parlux Fragrances and was made available for purchase on Rihanna's official perfume website and also at Macy's, Dillards and Belk stores.

== Background ==
In light of her success with her three previous fragrances, Reb'l Fleur, Rebelle and Nude, Rihanna decided to embark on her fourth fragrance Rogue. The fragrance bottle abandons the previous designs of Rihanna's first three fragrances. Of the fragrance, Rihanna said "People are always changing and evolving, and with Rogue, my new fragrance, I wanted to switch it up to reflect who I am today. It's a personal fragrance that's more self-aware. It's Rogue, it's me."

== Information ==
Rihanna described the fragrance as being "for all women for every mood". The top notes of the fragrance include lemon blossom, cyclamen, bergamot and pink peppercorn. The middle notes consist of Jasmine, rose, muget, plum and suede while the base notes are sandalwood, patchouli, golden amber and vanilla.

== Promotion ==
The promotional campaign for Rogue was shot by photographer, Mario Sorrenti, known for his photographs in Vogue and Harper's Bazaar. The first glimpse of the campaign was released by Rihanna herself, on the social media platform, Instagram. The singer is seen posing seductively next to a large bottle of her fragrance. Further images of the campaign were later released; as behind the scenes footage of the campaign shoot for the fragrance was released on Rihanna's YouTube page. Additionally, a large projection of a promotional image for Rogue was displayed on the Marble Arch at central London to promote the fragrance.

Rihanna also attended the launch of her fragrance in Barbados and in Sephora, Paris on June 4, 2014.

== Products ==
Rogue For Women By Rihanna Eau De Parfum Spray

- 125 ml/ 4.2 oz
- 75 ml/ 2.5 oz
- 30 ml/ 1.0 oz

Rogue For Women By Rihanna Eau De Parfum Roller Ball

- 5 ml/ 0.20 oz

Rogue For Women By Rihanna Body Lotion

- 200 ml/ 6.7 oz

== Reception ==
The fragrance was nominated for Celebrity Fragrance of the Year at the 2014 Fragrance Foundation awards, which was held on June 16, 2014.

== Rogue Man ==
Rogue Man

Fragrance by Rihanna
- Released: October 21, 2014
- Label: Parlux Fragrances
- Predecessor: Rogue by Rihanna

Rogue Man is the fifth overall fragrance and first men's fragrance released by Barbadian singer Rihanna. The fragrance was first available to purchase from Macy's on October 12, 2014.

=== Background ===
The perfume was developed by Frank Voelkl as an oriental – woody. In the top notes there are bergamot, clementine, black pepper and rosemary. The heart consists of cedar, jasmine, vanilla orchid and labdanum, leaning on the base of sandalwood, patchouli, amber, musk and tonka bean.

=== Promotion ===
The advertising campaign for Rogue Man was shot by photographer Mario Sorrenti and shows Rihanna and tattooed model Daniel Ness. In black and white shots, the singer is seen with her face pressed sensually into Ness' neck as she wraps her arms around him from behind. She also posted on Twitter: ""LADIES!!! This September wake up next to your man smelling like this!!! Makes you wanna steal his Tshirts #ROGUEMAN."

Rihanna made an appearance at Macy's at Lenox Square Mall on October 25, 2014. The first 500 customers who purchased the fragrance from the store had the opportunity to meet and receive a photo with her.

=== Products ===
Rogue Man by Rihanna Eau de Toilette

- 100ml / 3.4oz
- 30ml / 1oz

Rogue Man by Rihanna Shower Gel

- 90ml / 3oz

Rogue Man by Rihanna After Shave Balm

- 90ml / 3oz
