= Clara Lionel Foundation =

Nonprofit organization founded by Rihanna

- Founded: 2012
- Founder: Rihanna
- Type: 501(c)(3) organization
- Purpose: To improve the quality of life for communities globally in the areas of health, education, arts and culture.
- Headquarters: New York City
- Key people: Jessie Schutt-Aine (Executive director)
- Website: claralionelfoundation.org

The Clara Lionel Foundation (CLF) is a nonprofit organization founded in 2012 by Barbadian singer Rihanna, that funds groundbreaking education and emergency preparedness and response programs around the world.

In March 2020, the fund donated US$5 million toward COVID-19 response efforts.

== Name ==
Rihanna founded the Clara Lionel Foundation in 2012, in honor of her grandparents, Clara and Lionel Braithwaite. Programs include the Clara Braithwaite Center for Oncology and Nuclear Medicine at the Queen Elizabeth Hospital in Barbados, and education programs. The foundation was set up in order to reach "across borders to fight together for basic rights to education and health." Today, the foundation supports and funds innovative and effective education and emergency response programs around the world, aiming to improve the quality of life for young people everywhere.

== Activities ==
=== Emergency preparedness and climate resilience ===
The Clara Lionel Foundation works to help less fortunate youth around the world. She advocates for better, formal education in places like the Caribbean, East Africa, and U.S. South alongside proper reformation. One of the core pillars of the Clara Lionel Foundation's work is to transform the way the world responds to natural disasters. Through its work supporting relief efforts for hurricanes Harvey, Irma, and Maria, which together caused $380 billion in damages and killed thousands of people, as well as Cyclone Idai in East Africa, CLF saw the challenges with traditional current disaster response systems work. "In 2018, the foundation decided to begin testing a different approach, focused on proactively making buildings, infrastructure, and social systems stronger so that they would be most likely to survive future storms, preventing damage rather than repeatedly rebuilding. In a first pilot, the foundation is working with International Planned Parenthood Federation and Engineers Without Borders to make reproductive health clinics in the Caribbean more resilient to disasters."

On September 19, 2019, in response to Hurricane Dorian, one of the strongest Atlantic storms in history, CLF announced a $1 million funding package to be distributed to Airlink, All Hands and Hearts, Direct Relief, the Information Technology Disaster Resource Center, Team Rubicon and World Central Kitchen.

==== COVID-19 pandemic ====
In March 2020, Rihanna donated $5,000,000 to COVID-19 relief and followed that up with additional donations of personal protective equipment to the state of New York and an offer of $700,000 worth of ventilators to her home country Barbados. Recipient organizations included Direct Relief, Feeding America, the World Health Organization’s COVID-19 Solidarity Response Fund, Partners In Health and the International Rescue Committee. In April 2020, Rihanna further donated an additional $2,100,000, matching Twitter CEO Jack Dorsey for a total of $4,200,000, to provide support and resources to individuals and children suffering from domestic violence amid the lockdown. As of December 2021, CLF had donated $47 million to help with COVID relief efforts and racial justice issues.

=== Women's Entrepeneurship ===
Her nonprofit foundation also supports businesses run by women who promote cultural preservation and climate-smart ventures: “At Giraffe Bioenergy, women plant and transform cassava into ethanol cooking fuel—a clean alternative replacing toxic fuels while improving health and creating income.” Gather, a program within the foundation, invest into businesses like these and transform their communities into better places.

=== Education ===
I feel strongly that all children everywhere should be afforded the opportunity of a quality education, therefore I'm proud to announce Clara Lionel Foundation's partnership with education advocacy leaders like the Global Partnership for Education and Global Citizen. Working together, I know we can amplify our efforts and ensure that millions of children gain access to education globally.

— Rihanna, discussing the Clara Lionel Foundation's partnership with the Global Partnership for Education

In September 2016, the Clara Lionel Foundation partnered with Global Partnership for Education and Global Citizen on a multi-year initiative to support education across the world. Through this push, Rihanna hoped to advocate for more than a quarter of a billion children who are not currently in school as well as about 330 million students who aren't learning in the schools they're in. As GPE's new Global Ambassador, Rihanna aimed to reach more than 60 developing countries, prioritizing those with the most need, including children in conflict and crisis areas.

In May 2016, Rihanna announced a scholarship program through the Clara Lionel Foundation, that will award students attending college in the United States. The scholarship is need-based, ranging from $5,000 to $50,000, and may be renewed for up to three more years or until they earn their bachelor's degree. The only requirements for eligibility were that applicants have been accepted into a bachelor's degree program at an accredited four-year U.S. college or university for the 2016-17 year and that they are residents of either Barbados, Brazil, Cuba, Haiti, Guyana, Jamaica, or the U.S.

In January 2017, Rihanna visited Malawi with her foundation where she met with educators, government officials and students. Eight months later in August, Rihanna announced a partnership with bike-share platform ofo to fund scholarships for girls in Malawi through the foundation's Global Scholarship Program, as well as donate bikes to those students to relieve transportation challenges in getting to class. The first batch of ofo bikes had already been put into use in Malawi, starting the five-year partnership.

=== Other partnerships ===
On February 28, 2017 fashion house Dior announced it would be partnering with the Clara Lionel Foundation. Dior will be donating a percentage of proceeds from each "We Should All Be Feminists" t-shirt – made famous on their Spring 2017 runway and by Rihanna's social media – to the foundation. The t-shirts were made available in all Dior retail boutiques worldwide for fourteen days.

On May 5, 2017 it was announced that Rihanna would be teaming up with the Parsons School of Design, one the world's leading art and design schools, Donna Karan and her Urban Zen Foundation, and Haitian artisans to develop a merchandise line. The new collection will be a collaborative effort between Parsons design students and local artisans at the Design, Organization, Training Center in Port-au-Prince, Haiti. Alison Mears, director of the Healthy Materials Lab at Parsons, stated that the school "are ecstatic that students will have the opportunity to work with and develop a merchandise line for Rihanna's Clara Lionel Foundation, that, like Parsons, shares a strong commitment to creating positive social change. Through this partnership with Donna Karan and Urban Zen, students will live Parsons' mission, taking a multidisciplinary collaborative approach and utilizing local sustainable practices and healthier materials to create products that benefit Haiti and the Clara Lionel Foundation."

=== Diamond Ball ===
Every year, the Diamond Ball offers the foundation an opportunity to raise funds for its global programs, and features special guest performances. The inaugural Diamond Ball was held in December 2014 at The Vineyard Beverly Hills, California, and included performances by Rihanna and guest speech from Brad Pitt. In December 2015, Rihanna held her second annual Diamond Ball at Santa Monica Airport's Barker Hangar. The Ball was hosted by Kevin Hart and included performances from singer Lionel Richie. The ball went on to raise $3 million in order to help those in need through health, education, arts and culture.

In a press release for the third Diamond Ball, held on September 14, 2017 in New York City, Rihanna stated "New York always offers the perfect backdrop for an amazing event, which is why I am thrilled to have Diamond Ball there. It's a great way to celebrate the Clara Lionel Foundation's accomplishments as well as bring awareness to our mission globally." The ball featured appearances from Kendrick Lamar, Dave Chappelle, and—via video link, Barack Obama. In his speech, Obama thanked Rihanna for her philanthropic work, which included the ball itself—an auction including personalized items from Rihanna, Jay-Z, and others. The fourth Diamond Ball was held on September 13, 2018 at New York City. Issa Rae hosted the event, which included performances from Childish Gambino and DJ Mustard. In attendance were celebrities like Seth Meyers, Odell Beckham Jr., Tiffany Haddish, Paris Hilton, Jack Dorsey, and Trevor Noah. CLF held its fifth annual Diamond Ball on September 12, 2019 at Cipriani Wall Street in New York City. Hosted by Seth Meyers, the event featured performances by Pharrell Williams and DJ Khaled.

== Awards ==
In February 2017, Rihanna was named Harvard University's "Humanitarian of the Year" by the Harvard Foundation.
