= Rihanna =

Barbadian singer (born 1988)

The Right Excellent Rihanna NH
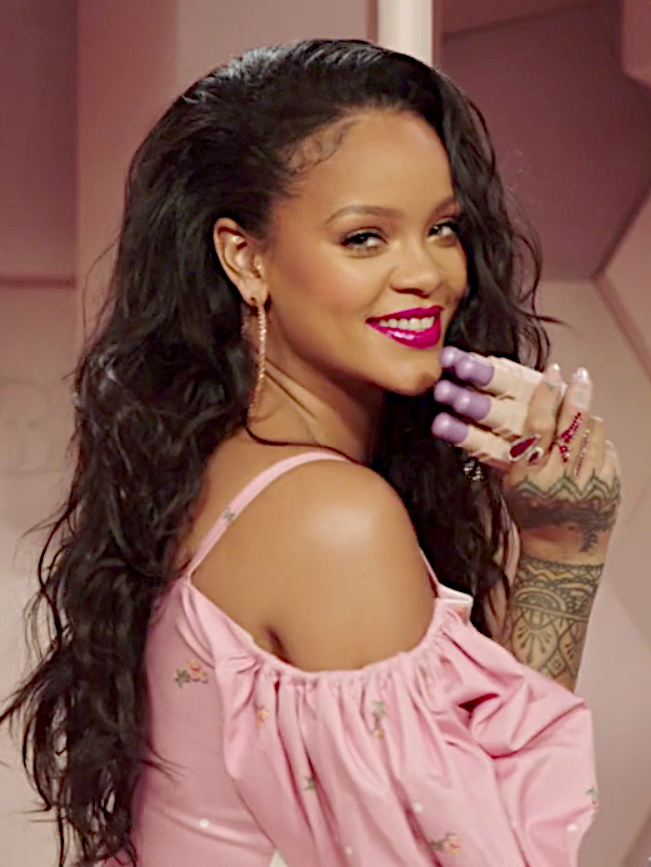
- Rihanna in 2018
- Born: Robyn Rihanna Fenty; February 20, 1988 (age 38); Saint Michael, Barbados
- Occupations: Singer; songwriter; businesswoman; actress
- Years active: 2003–present
- Organisations: Clara Lionel Foundation; Savage X Fenty; Fenty Beauty
- Works: Albums; singles; songs; videos; performances
- Partner: ASAP Rocky (2020–present)
- Children: 3
- Awards: Full list
- Musical career
- Origin: New York City, US
- Genres: R&B; pop
- Instruments: Vocals
- Labels: Roc Nation; Def Jam; SRP; Westbury Road

Barbadian Ambassador Extraordinary and Plenipotentiary
- Incumbent
- Assumed office September 20, 2018
- Prime Minister: Mia Mottley
- Preceded by: Position established
- Website: rihanna.com

Robyn Rihanna Fenty (/riˈænə/ ree-AN-ə; (Note: It is also common for English-language speakers to pronounce her name /riˈɑːnə/ ree-AH-nə.) born February 20, 1988) is a Barbadian singer, songwriter, businesswoman, and actress. An influential figure in popular culture, she is known for her multifaceted career, artistic reinventions, and eclectic fashion style. With estimated sales exceeding 250 million records, Rihanna is one of the best-selling music artists of all time.

After signing with Def Jam Recordings, Rihanna debuted with the Caribbean-inspired records Music of the Sun (2005) and A Girl Like Me (2006), both of which reached the top ten of the US Billboard 200. Their respective lead singles, "Pon de Replay" and "SOS", peaked at numbers two and one on the US Billboard Hot 100. Adopting a more mature image, Rihanna rose to stardom and transitioned to dance-pop and R&B with her best-selling album Good Girl Gone Bad (2007) and its reissue, subtitled Reloaded (2008). The project yielded a string of successful songs, including the US number-one singles "Umbrella", "Take a Bow", and "Disturbia". Her guest appearances on "Live Your Life", "Love the Way You Lie", and "The Monster" also topped the Billboard Hot 100.

After exploring more personal themes on the rock-influenced record Rated R (2009), Rihanna returned to her more upbeat sound with the dance-pop influenced albums Loud (2010) and Talk That Talk (2011), and topped the Billboard 200 with her synth-pop album Unapologetic (2012). Departing from Def Jam in favour of Roc Nation, she released Anti (2016), her second number-one album. These albums contained the US number-one singles "Rude Boy", "Only Girl (In the World)", "What's My Name?", "S&M", "We Found Love", "Diamonds", and "Work". Since 2016, Rihanna has been releasing singles and performing sporadically. She has also ventured into acting, and her film roles include Battleship (2012), Home (2015), Ocean's 8 (2018), and Smurfs (2025).

Rihanna is the recipient of numerous accolades, including nine Grammy Awards, twelve Billboard Music Awards, thirteen American Music Awards, and seven MTV Video Music Awards. She is the highest-certified female digital single artist by the Recording Industry Association of America, and has eight diamond-certified singles and fourteen number-one singles on the Billboard Hot 100. The first female musician to achieve billionaire status, Rihanna founded the nonprofit Clara Lionel Foundation, the cosmetics brand Fenty Beauty, and the fashion brand Fenty under LVMH. She was named an ambassador by the Government of Barbados in 2018 and declared a National Hero of Barbados in 2021.

== Life and career ==
=== 1988–2002: Early life ===
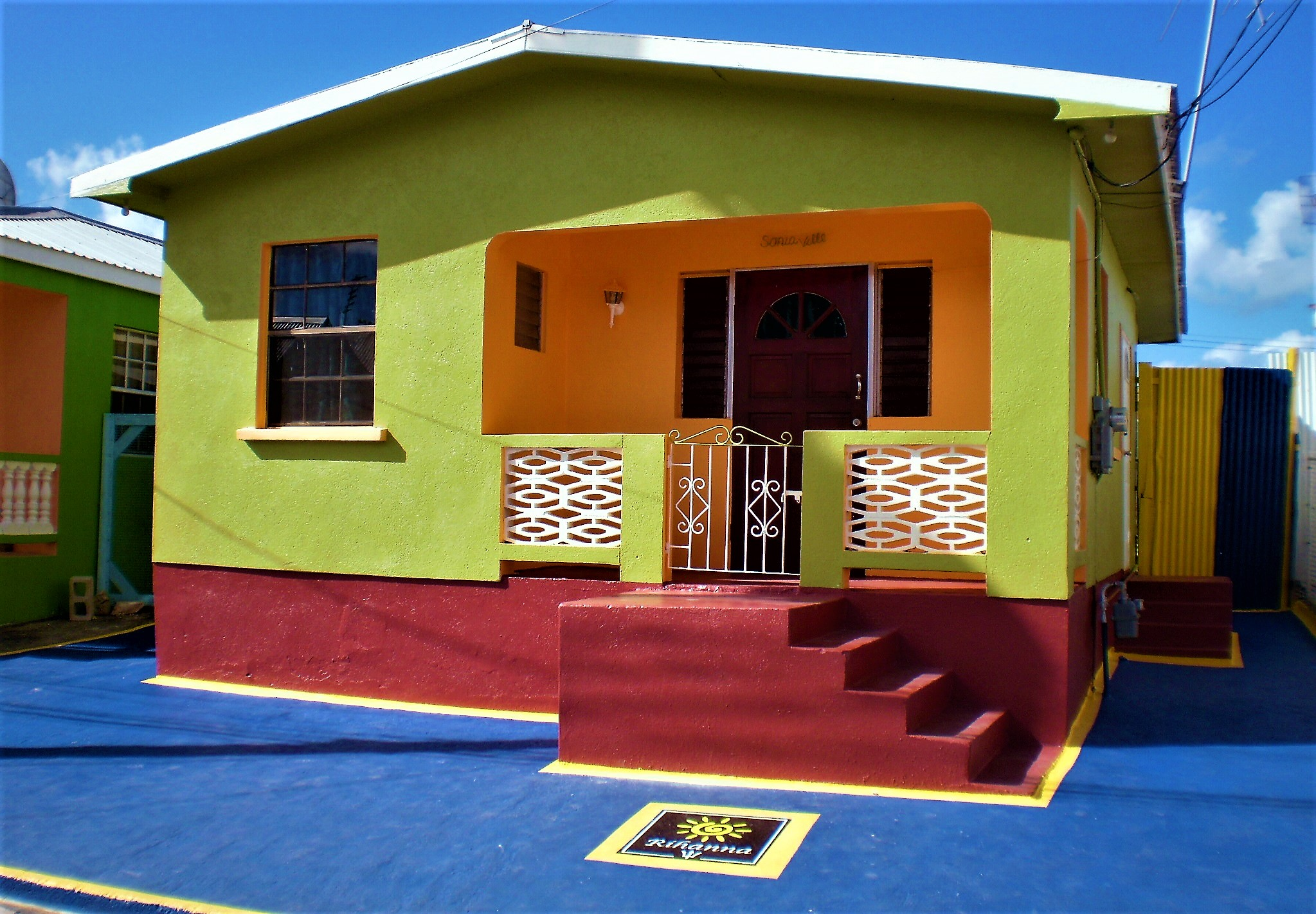
Rihanna's parents' house in Bridgetown, just a few meters from the city's harbour

Robyn Rihanna Fenty was born in Saint Michael, Barbados, on February 20, 1988. She is the daughter of Monica (née Braithwaite), an Afro-Guyanese accountant, and Ronald Fenty, a Barbadian warehouse supervisor of African, Irish, English, and Scottish descent. Rihanna has two younger brothers, Rorrey and Rajad Fenty, as well as two half-sisters and a half-brother from her father's previous relationships. She was raised in a three-bedroom bungalow in Bridgetown and helped her father sell clothes at a street stall. Her childhood was affected by her father's alcoholism and crack cocaine addiction, which strained her parents' marriage. Rihanna has spoken about witnessing her father physically abuse her mother, describing her as "one of the strongest women I know, if not the strongest".

As a child, Rihanna suffered from intense headaches that required multiple CT scans, with doctors once suspecting a tumour. Her health began to improve after her parents divorced when she was 14. She attended Charles F. Broome Memorial Primary School and Combermere School. One of her teachers described her as a "well-behaved student" who avoided trouble. She showed an interest in singing, dancing, and poetry. Around this time, Rihanna began listening to reggae artists such as Sizzla and Damien Marley, as well as R&B musicians like Whitney Houston and Mariah Carey. At the age of 11, she became a cadet in Barbados's Cadet Corps, with future singer Shontelle as her drill sergeant. Though she initially planned to finish high school, she ultimately dropped out at age 16 to pursue a music career.

=== 2003–2006: Career beginnings with Music of the Sun and A Girl Like Me ===
In 2003, Rihanna formed a music trio with two classmates in Barbados. Unnamed and without original material, the girl group auditioned for American producer Evan Rogers, who recalled that "the minute Rihanna walked into the room, it was like the other two girls didn't exist". The trio went on to perform a cover of Destiny's Child's "Emotion". Impressed, Rogers arranged a second meeting with Rihanna and her mother—this time without the other two girls—and later invited them to his hometown in Connecticut to record demo tapes for record label submissions. Rihanna's demo tape included "Pon de Replay" and "The Last Time". In 2005, she became the first artist to sign with Syndicated Rhythm Productions, the production company founded by Rogers and Carl Sturken.

Rihanna's demo was sent to rapper Jay-Z, who had just become the president and CEO of the record label Def Jam Recordings. Although Jay-Z initially thought "Pon de Replay" was too big for a new artist, he invited her to audition. In early 2005, she performed in New York City for Jay-Z and music executive Antonio "L.A." Reid, singing Whitney Houston's "For the Love of You" along with demo tracks "Pon de Replay" and "The Last Time". Jay-Z was convinced of her potential, and Reid told him not to let her leave the building without a deal. She waited in Jay-Z's office while lawyers finalized a six-album contract with Def Jam. Rihanna cancelled scheduled meetings with other labels and, shortly after turning 16, moved from Barbados to the US. There, she completed her high school education with a tutor.

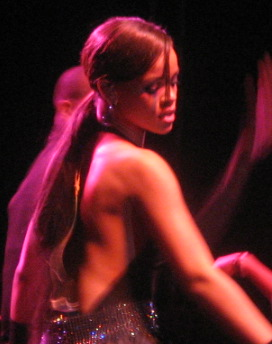
Rihanna performing at the KIIS-FM Jingle Ball in 2005

After Rihanna signed with Def Jam, Jay-Z and his team spent three months completing her debut studio album. She collaborated with various producers, primarily Rogers and Sturken. "Pon de Replay" was selected as the lead single because of its summer appeal. The song was released on May 25, 2005, and became a commercial success, reaching number two on both the US Billboard Hot 100 and the UK Singles Chart. Her debut studio album, Music of the Sun, was released on August 29, 2005. It debuted at number ten on the US Billboard 200 with first-week sales of 69,000 units. Its second single, "If It's Lovin' That You Want", peaked at number 36 in the US. Rihanna made her acting debut with a cameo in the straight-to-DVD film Bring It On: All or Nothing (2006), in which she portrayed herself.

Soon after releasing Music of the Sun, Rihanna began working on her second studio album in September 2005. Titled A Girl Like Me, the record was released on April 25, 2006. A pop and reggae album, A Girl Like Me peaked at number five on the Billboard 200 chart, with 115,000 copies sold in the US in its first week. It became her first RIAA-certified double platinum album, surpassing one million units sold. It spawned four singles: "SOS", "Unfaithful", "We Ride", and "Break It Off". "SOS" became her first song to reach number one on the Billboard Hot 100, while "Unfaithful" peaked within the top ten of charts worldwide. To promote both A Girl Like Me and Music of the Sun, Rihanna embarked on her debut headlining concert tour, entitled Rihanna: Live in Concert Tour, throughout 2006.

=== 2007–2008: Good Girl Gone Bad ===
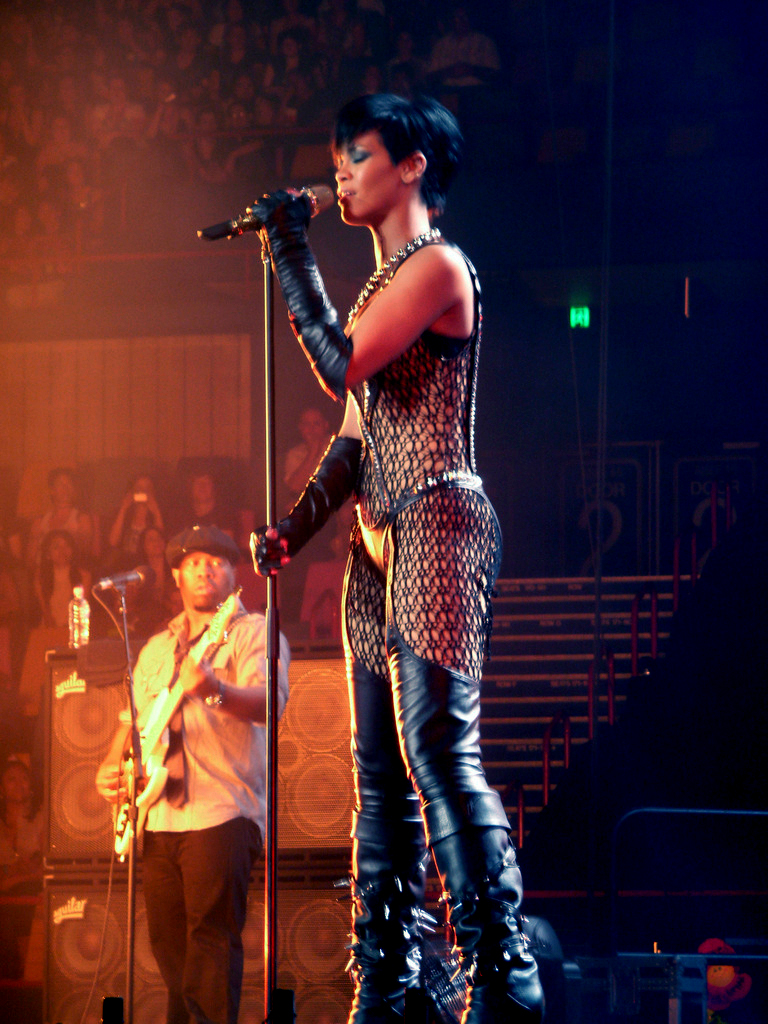
Rihanna performing at the Good Girl Gone Bad Tour in 2008

In early 2007, Rihanna began recording her third studio album. Aiming to dismiss her girl-next-door image in favour of a more mature and rebellious persona, she worked with such producers as Ne-Yo, Timbaland, Justin Timberlake, and Tricky Stewart for the album. The result, Good Girl Gone Bad, was released on May 31, 2007, to critical acclaim. Regarded as a turning point in her career, it marked a shift from the Caribbean-influenced sound of her earlier work, embracing a more contemporary pop direction driven by uptempo dance tracks. The album debuted at number two on the Billboard 200, selling 162,000 copies in its first week.

The lead single from Good Girl Gone Bad was "Umbrella", featuring Jay-Z. It topped the charts in several territories, spending ten and seven consecutive weeks at number one on the UK Singles Chart and Billboard Hot 100, respectively. The following singles, "Shut Up and Drive" and "Hate That I Love You", peaked at numbers fifteen and seven on the Billboard Hot 100, respectively, while the album's fourth single, "Don't Stop the Music", reached number three. In support of the album, Rihanna embarked on the worldwide Good Girl Gone Bad Tour in September 2007, performing 80 concerts across five continents. At the 50th Grammy Awards, she received multiple nominations for Good Girl Gone Bad and won the Grammy Award for Best Rap/Sung Collaboration for "Umbrella" alongside Jay-Z. In late 2008, she released "Rehab", the fifth and final single from Good Girl Gone Bad; it peaked within the top 20 of the charts in both the US and UK. Having sold nine million copies as of 2023, Good Girl Gone Bad is her best-selling album worldwide.

Entertainment Weekly named Rihanna "Diva of the Year" in 2008, praising her "newfound staying power". In April 2008, Rihanna joined Kanye West as a supporting act on his Glow in the Dark Tour. The reissue of Good Girl Gone Bad, subtitled Reloaded, was released on June 2; selling 63,000 copies in its first week, it helped the original album rise to number seven in the US. Reloaded spawned four new tracks, two of which—"Disturbia" and "Take a Bow"—topped the Billboard Hot 100. Soon after the release of Reloaded, she issued Good Girl Gone Bad Live, a DVD documentary featuring Rihanna's December 2007 concert at the Manchester Arena. In 2008, she announced her romantic relationship with singer Chris Brown and topped the Hot 100 for six weeks with a feature on rapper T.I.'s song "Live Your Life".

=== 2009–2011: Domestic violence case, Rated R, and Loud ===
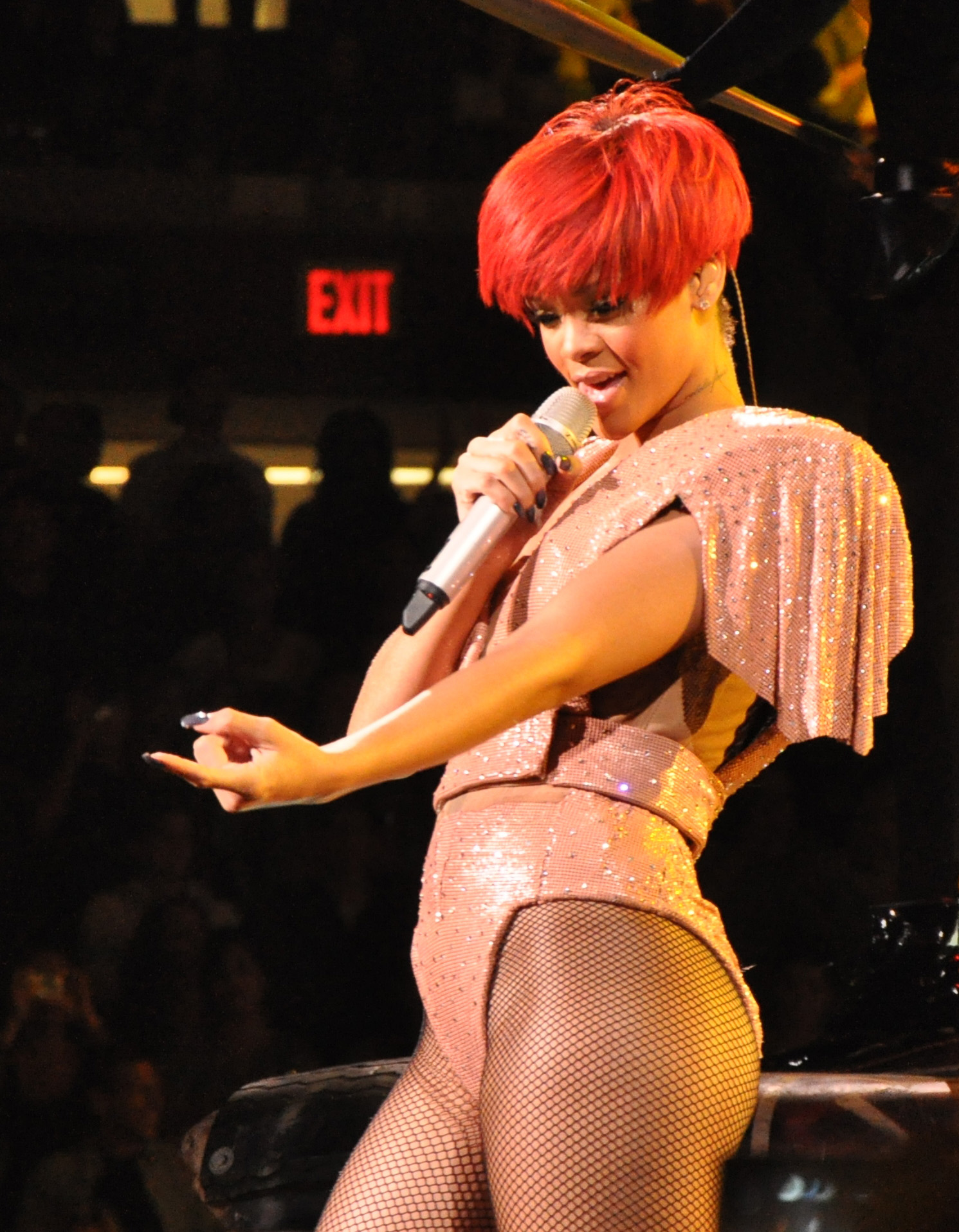
Rihanna performing at the Last Girl on Earth tour in 2010

On February 8, 2009, Rihanna was assaulted by Brown who caused facial injuries requiring hospital treatment. Rihanna canceled her scheduled performance the next day at the 51st Annual Grammy Awards, a planned duet with Justin Timberlake singing "Umbrella". Brown turned himself in to the police. On March 5, 2009, he was formally charged with assault and making criminal threats. The case garnered widespread media attention, particularly after TMZ published a leaked police photograph showing Rihanna with visible injuries.

Rihanna was subpoenaed to testify at a preliminary hearing in Los Angeles on June 22, 2009. The incident and its aftermath influenced her artistically, prompting her to begin work on her fourth studio album, titled Rated R, one month after the Grammy Awards. Released on November 20, Rated R marked a shift away from the upbeat sound of Rihanna's earlier albums, embracing a darker, more introspective tone with rock influences. The album debuted at number 4 on the Billboard 200 chart and sold 181,000 copies in its first week. The single "Rude Boy" peaked atop the Hot 100 for six weeks, while "Russian Roulette" and "Hard" both peaked within the top ten. Rihanna entered an on-again, off-again relationship with Canadian rapper Drake in 2009 and, in support of Rated R, embarked on the Last Girl on Earth tour from 2010 to 2011.

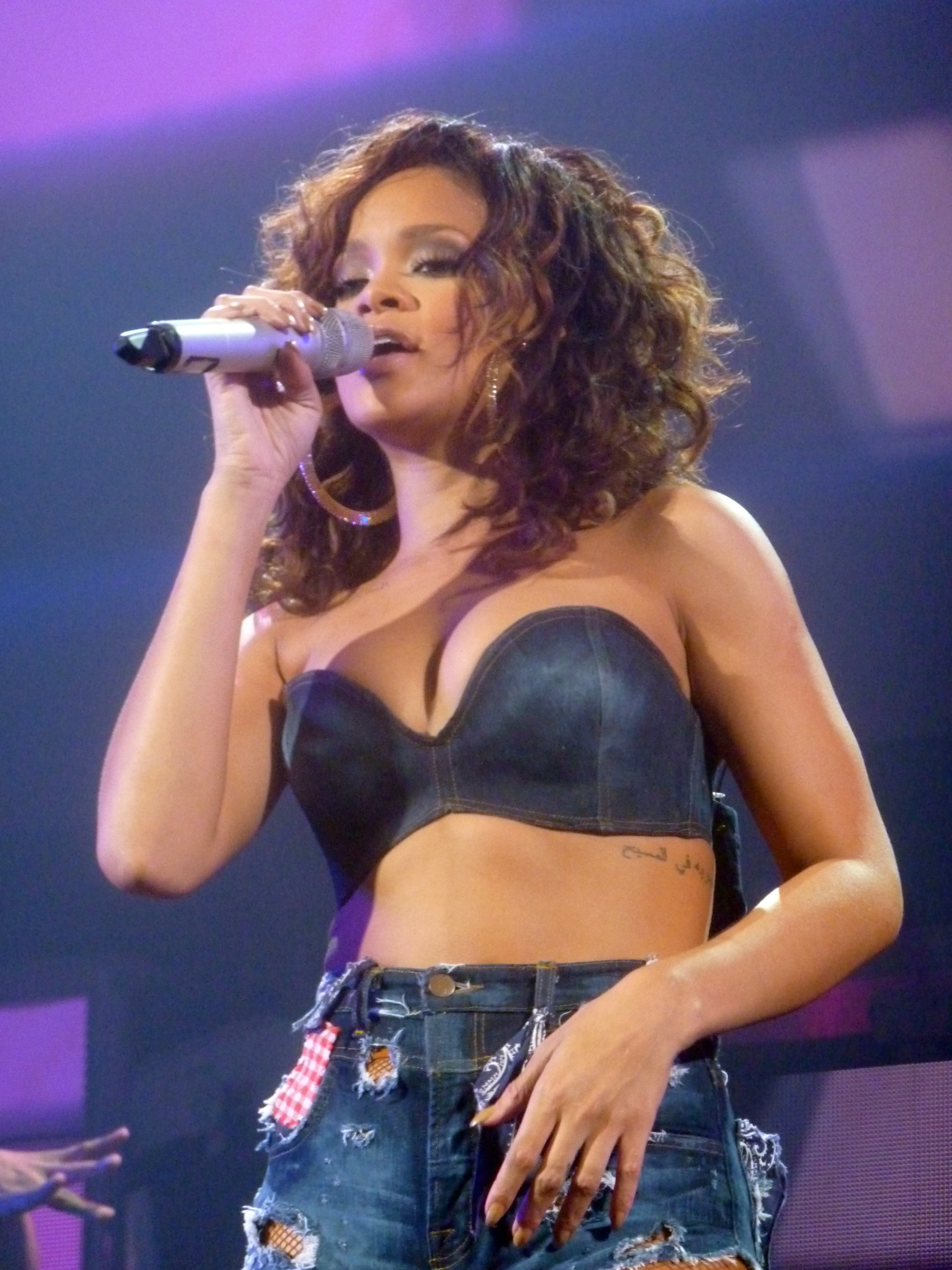
Rihanna performing at the Loud Tour in 2011

In June 2010, Rihanna collaborated with rapper Eminem on the single "Love the Way You Lie". It topped the Billboard Hot 100 for seven consecutive weeks and peaked at number 2 in the UK; it was also the latter country's best-selling song of 2010. In October that year, Rihanna switched management, signing with Jay-Z's Roc Nation. She returned to her more upbeat sound with her fifth album, Loud, which was released on November 12, 2010. A dance-pop record, Loud debuted at number three in the US with first-week sales of 207,000 copies. It spawned three Billboard Hot 100 number-one singles: "Only Girl (In the World)", "What's My Name?" featuring Drake, and "S&M", which topped the chart following the release of its remix with Britney Spears. Rihanna became the youngest and fastest solo artist in Billboard Hot 100 history to accumulate ten number-one singles.

At the 53rd Grammy Awards in 2011, "Only Girl (In the World)" won Best Dance Recording. The songs "Man Down", "California King Bed", and "Cheers (Drink to That)" were released as singles from Loud in 2011. To support the album, Rihanna launched the Loud Tour in June 2011, which included a record-breaking ten sold-out shows at The O2 Arena in London—the most by a female artist in the venue's history. The tour grossed $90 million, making it one of the highest-grossing tours worldwide that year. Also in 2011, she featured on three other artists' songs: West's "All of the Lights" from My Beautiful Dark Twisted Fantasy (2010), Nicki Minaj's "Fly" from her debut album Pink Friday (2010), and David Guetta's "Who's That Chick?" from One More Love (2010).

=== 2011–2013: Talk That Talk and Unapologetic ===
Rihanna aimed to explore more sexually expressive themes on her sixth studio album, Talk That Talk, which was released on November 18, 2011. A dance-oriented pop and R&B album, Talk That Talk opened at number three on the US Billboard 200 with first-week sales of 198,000 copies, while debuting atop the UK Albums Chart with 163,000 units sold. The album's lead single, "We Found Love", became a worldwide chart-topper. It spent ten non-consecutive weeks at number one on the Billboard Hot 100, making it both Rihanna's longest-running chart-topping single and the longest-running number one song in the US in 2011. The album spawned three other singles: "You da One", "Talk That Talk", and "Where Have You Been". "Where Have You Been" peaked at number five in the US.

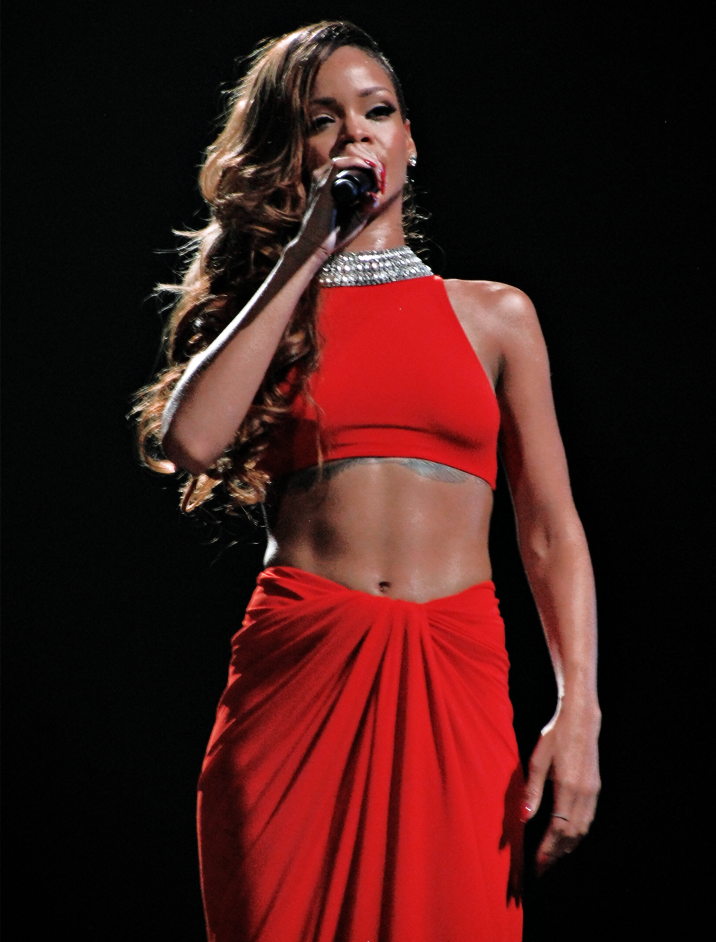
Rihanna performing at the Diamonds World Tour in 2013

In early 2012, Rihanna appeared on Coldplay's "Princess of China" and Drake's "Take Care". That February, she won the Grammy Award for Best Rap/Sung Collaboration for "All of the Lights" with West, and was named Best International Female Solo Artist at the Brit Awards for the second year in a row. In March, Rihanna and Brown released two remixes—her track "Birthday Cake" and his "Turn Up the Music"—which were criticized due to their history of domestic violence. In September 2012, the music video for "We Found Love" won Video of the Year at the MTV Video Music Awards, making Rihanna the first woman to receive the honour more than once. It later won the Grammy Award for Best Short Form Music Video in 2013.

Rihanna's seventh studio album, titled Unapologetic, was released on November 19, 2012. A synth-pop record with EDM and hip-hop elements, Unapologetic debuted at number one on the Billboard 200 with first-week sales of 238,000 copies, becoming Rihanna's first chart-topping album in the US. The album's lead single, "Diamonds", topped the US Billboard Hot 100, becoming Rihanna's twelfth number-one song on the chart. The album's second single, "Stay", reached number three in the US. To promote the album, Rihanna embarked on the 777 Tour, performing seven shows in seven countries over the course of seven days. A documentary about the tour aired on Fox in May 2013, followed by the release of a DVD version the next day—her third long-form live video.

In January 2013, Rihanna and Brown rekindled their relationship, although he remained under probation for their 2009 domestic violence case. The two broke up around four months later. Rihanna made her feature film debut as Petty Officer Cora Raikes in Battleship (2012). Loosely inspired by the board game of the same name, Battleship received mixed reviews, though Neil Genzlinger, writing for The New York Times, said that she was "just fine in the rather generic role". That same month, the Official Charts reported she had sold 3.87 million records in the country over the past year, placing her at number one among the 2013 Brit Awards artist nominees. Her fifth headlining tour, the Diamonds World Tour, launched in March 2013 in support of Unapologetic. Rihanna made a cameo in the comedy film This Is the End (2013), and later collaborated with rapper Wale on his remix of the single "Bad". In December 2013, she topped both the Billboard Hot 100 and UK Singles Chart with a feature on Eminem's song "The Monster".

=== 2014–2017: Standalone releases and Anti ===
In 2014, Shakira featured Rihanna on her single "Can't Remember to Forget You". Following the release of Unapologetic and the ensuing tour, she expressed a desire to take a break from recording, saying she wanted "a year to just do whatever I want artistically, creatively". That May, she officially parted ways with Def Jam Recordings and transitioned fully to Roc Nation, the label that had been managing her career since October 2010. While working on her eighth studio album, Rihanna released the singles "FourFiveSeconds" (a collaboration with West and Paul McCartney), "Bitch Better Have My Money", and "American Oxygen"; none of the three appeared on the album's final tracklist. In 2015, she starred alongside Jim Parsons and Jennifer Lopez as the voice of Tip in the animated film Home. Rihanna also curated and released a concept album as its soundtrack.

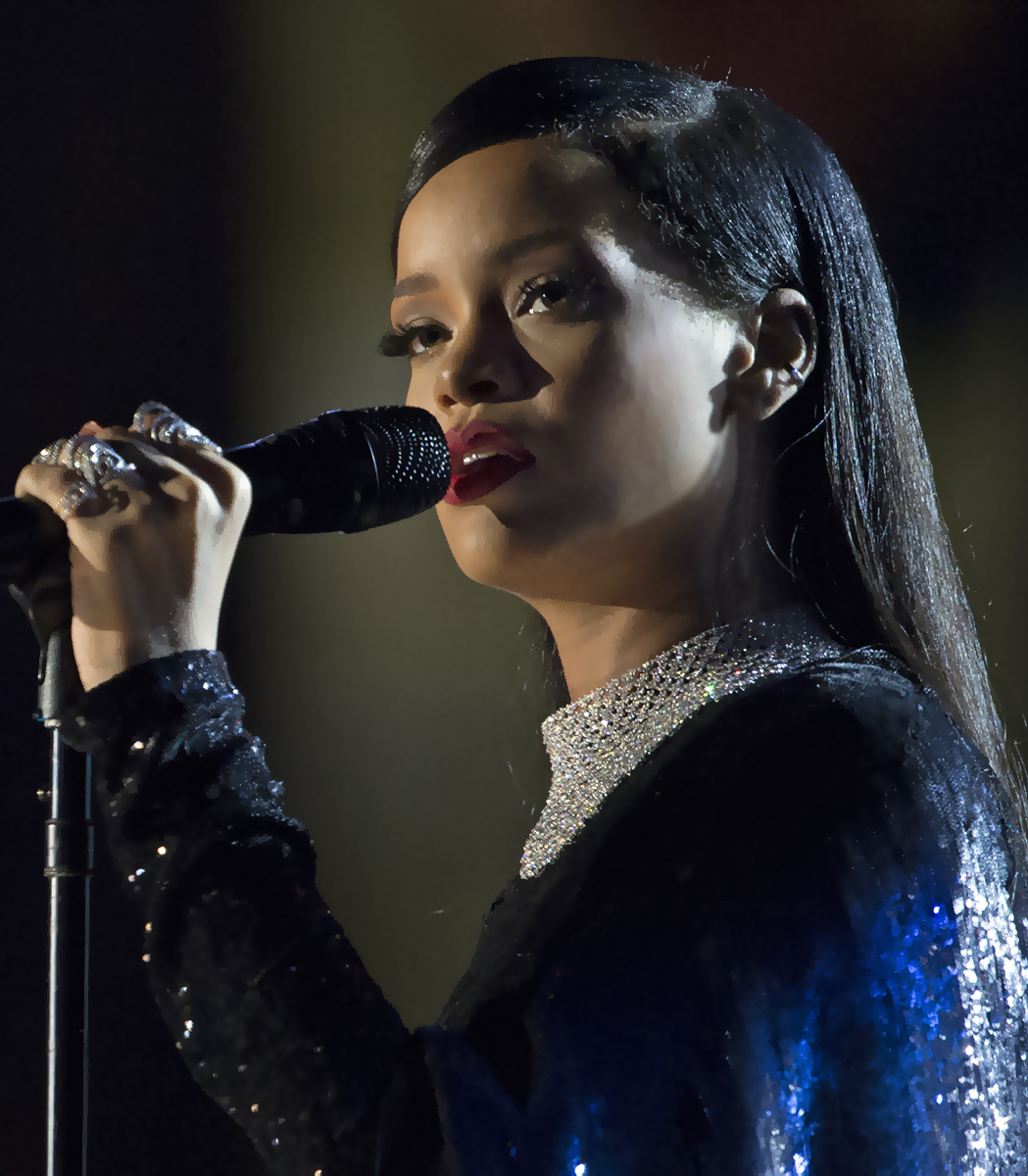
Rihanna performing at the Concert for Valor in 2014

In late 2015, Rihanna signed a $25 million deal with Samsung to promote its Galaxy product line, with the company also sponsoring the rollout of her eighth studio album, titled Anti, and its accompanying tour. The album was released exclusively on the streaming service Tidal on January 28, 2016. With an eclectic blend of genres such as pop, dancehall, and psychedelic soul, Anti peaked at number one on the Billboard 200, marking her second chart-topping record in the US. The lead single, "Work", topped the US Billboard Hot 100 for nine weeks, with the third and fourth singles, "Needed Me" and "Love on the Brain", peaking within the top ten. Announced in November 2015, the Anti World Tour was launched in March 2016 in support of the album.

In 2016, Rihanna appeared as a featured artist on multiple singles: Calvin Harris's "This Is What You Came For"; Drake's "Too Good"; and Mike Will Made It's "Nothing Is Promised". "This Is What You Came For" was a commercial success, peaking at number two and three in the UK and US, respectively. In June 2016, Rihanna released "Sledgehammer" as part of the film soundtrack for Star Trek Beyond. In August, she was honoured with the Michael Jackson Video Vanguard Award at the 2016 MTV Video Music Awards, where she performed a series of medleys of her most successful songs. In 2017, she extended her run of collaborations, appearing on DJ Khaled's "Wild Thoughts" and Kendrick Lamar's "Loyalty". The former peaked at number two in the US, while the latter won her and Lamar the Grammy Award for Best Rap/Sung Performance.

In 2017, Rihanna portrayed Marion Crane in a recurring role during the fifth and final season of Bates Motel; the show was met with widespread critical acclaim. In Luc Besson's sci-fi film Valerian and the City of a Thousand Planets (2017), she played a shapeshifting, burlesque-style entertainer and performer in a space station club, starring alongside Dane DeHaan and Cara Delevingne. That year, Rihanna began dating Saudi businessman Hassan Jameel; their relationship ended in 2020.

=== 2018–present: Hiatus, motherhood, and Super Bowl LVII halftime show ===
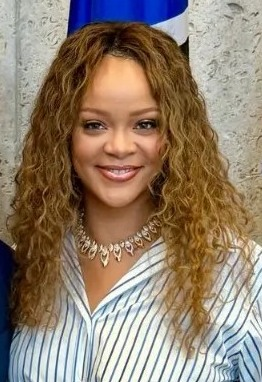
Rihanna visiting the US Embassy in Barbados in 2024

Rihanna was part of the all-female ensemble cast of the heist film Ocean's 8 (2018), directed by Gary Ross. The film was a major box office success, earning $300 million globally. Alongside Donald Glover, she starred in the film Guava Island (2019), in which she played his character's love interest. In September 2019, it was announced that she had signed with Sony/ATV Music Publishing. Rihanna appeared on PartyNextDoor's song "Believe It" (2020). American rapper ASAP Rocky confirmed that he and Rihanna were in a relationship in May 2021; the two started dating around a year prior, soon after she had broken up with Jameel. Rihanna gave birth to their first son in 2022.

The lead single from the soundtrack of the film Black Panther: Wakanda Forever (2022), titled "Lift Me Up", was her first solo musical release since Anti. The song earned her nominations for the Golden Globe and Academy Award for Best Original Song. On February 12, 2023, she headlined the Super Bowl LVII halftime show, which marked her first live performance in over five years, and the end of her previously self-imposed boycott of the event, which she instigated in solidarity with Colin Kaepernick. The performance drew 121.017 million viewers, making it the most-watched Super Bowl halftime show in history, surpassing Katy Perry's Super Bowl XLIX performance. It earned Rihanna five Primetime Emmy Award nominations, including one for Outstanding Variety Special (Live).

Rihanna became the first person to headline a Super Bowl halftime show while pregnant, revealing her pregnancy during the performance. Later in 2023, she gave birth to her and ASAP Rocky's second son. In 2025, she voiced Smurfette in the animated comedy film Smurfs, which was critically panned, and gave birth to her and ASAP Rocky's third child, a daughter. On March 8, 2026, the Los Angeles Police Department reported that Rihanna's Beverly Hills home, which she shares with ASAP Rocky, was shot at by a suspect with an AR-15–style rifle. A female suspect was taken into custody. Rihanna was home at the time of the incident, but no injuries were reported.

On July 12, 2026, Rihanna performed live as guest artist for the Jay-Z 30 Tour at the Yankee Stadium in New York City, singing "Run This Town" and "Bitch Better Have My Money" alongside Jay-Z.

== Artistry ==
=== Music and voice ===
Rihanna is a mezzo-soprano with a vocal range spanning from B_{2} to C♯_{6}. She began vocal training during the recording of Good Girl Gone Bad (2007) under the guidance of Ne-Yo, who taught her breathing techniques and vocal delivery. Critics have highlighted her versatility across different projects: James Skinner of the BBC described her performance on "Love the Way You Lie (Part II)" as "commanding, soulful and vulnerable", while Andy Gill of The Independent cited "California King Bed" as her strongest vocal performance. Billboard said that "Diamonds" showcased her "throatiest, most impassioned vocals", and Jon Caramanica of The New York Times wrote that her voice developed into "a weapon of emotional chill and strategic indifference". In 2023, Rolling Stone ranked her sixty-eighth on its list of the "200 Greatest Singers of All Time". Rihanna often co-writes her songs alongside a team of collaborators.

Rihanna's music is primarily R&B and pop, and incorporates elements of various genres like dancehall, EDM, and adult contemporary. Her musical career has been marked by experimentation, and she has stated that her goal was "to make music that could be heard in parts of the world that I'd never been to". In Barbados, Rihanna drew early inspiration from reggae, soca, and hip-hop, and after relocating to the US, she was introduced to a wider variety of genres, including rock. Rihanna's early dancehall roots are evident on her first two albums, Music of the Sun (2005) and A Girl Like Me (2006). Music of the Sun demonstrates the influence of her Caribbean musical heritage; Kelefa Sanneh of The New York Times called Rihanna "the latest singer to discover how versatile the genre's spring-loaded electronic rhythms can be". Aiming for artistic growth, A Girl Like Me expresses personal experiences that typical young adult women undergo, with ballads that were described as elegant and mature. Good Girl Gone Bad (2007) marked a departure from her Caribbean-influenced beginnings and is widely regarded as a turning point in her career, with uptempo dance-pop tracks like "Push Up on Me" and "Don't Stop the Music". The album's first half features strong 1980s pop influences, while the second half leans more toward traditional R&B.

Rihanna's rock-imbued record Rated R (2009), released after the assault by her then-boyfriend, Chris Brown, had a much darker tone and was filled with various emotions she experienced since then. With the dance-pop set Loud (2010), she reflected on the fun she had while recording the album, incorporating ballads, party anthems, and empowering love songs. On Talk That Talk (2011), Rihanna expanded on her dance-pop style while adopting a more overtly sexual persona and incorporating elements of R&B, hip-hop, dancehall, and dubstep. Loud and Talk That Talk saw her explore sexuality in her work ("S&M" and "Birthday Cake") and return to her dancehall roots ("Man Down" and "Watch n' Learn"). Vulnerability is explored on the pop and synth-pop record Unapologetic (2012), which Vulture described as an "act of defiance [...] to sort out her feelings about her [... ex-boyfriend Brown] and her public image". Anti (2016), created amidst creative struggles and emotional turmoil, incorporates lo-fi beats and eclectic influences such as soul and trap.

=== Influences ===
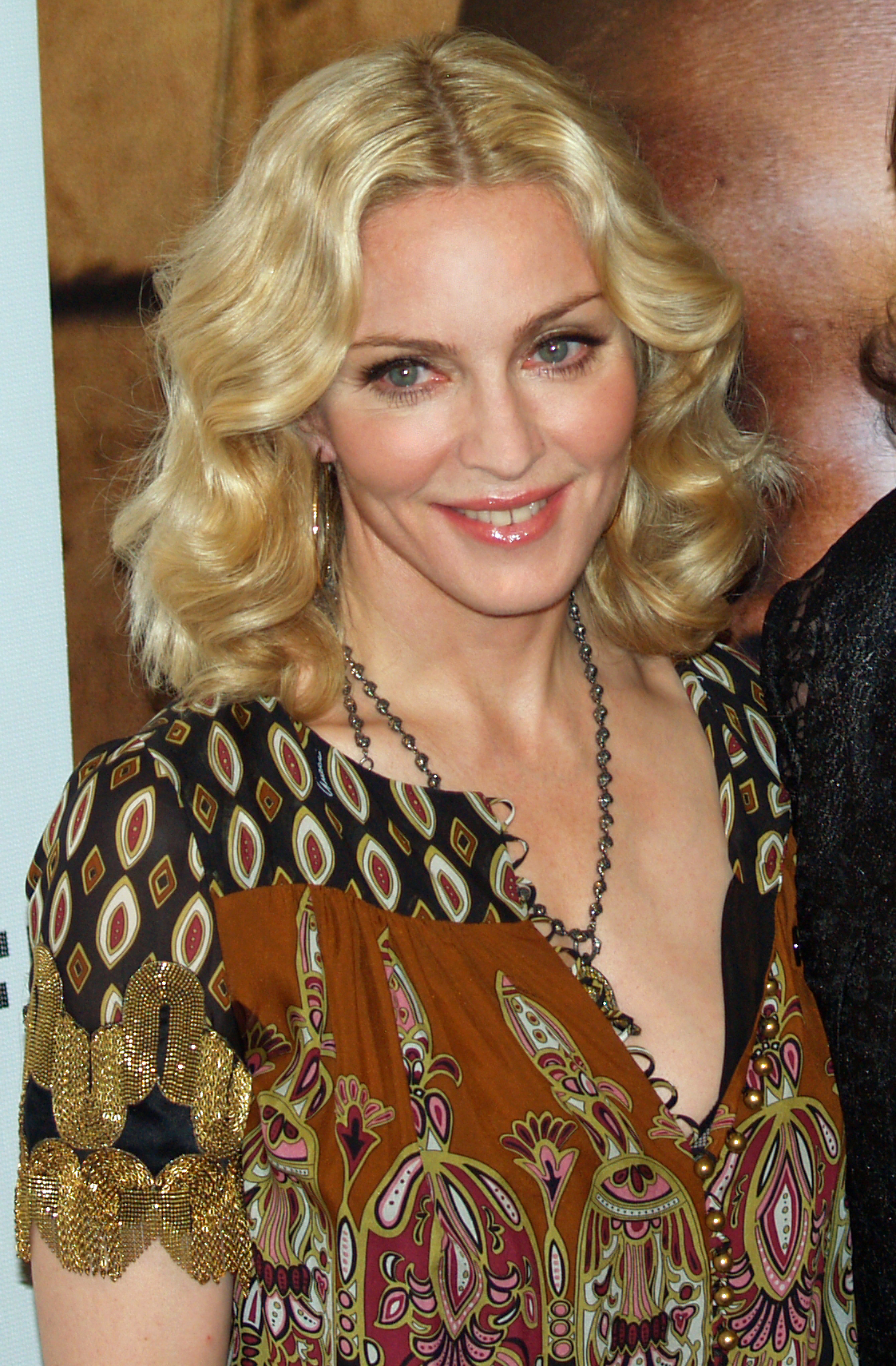
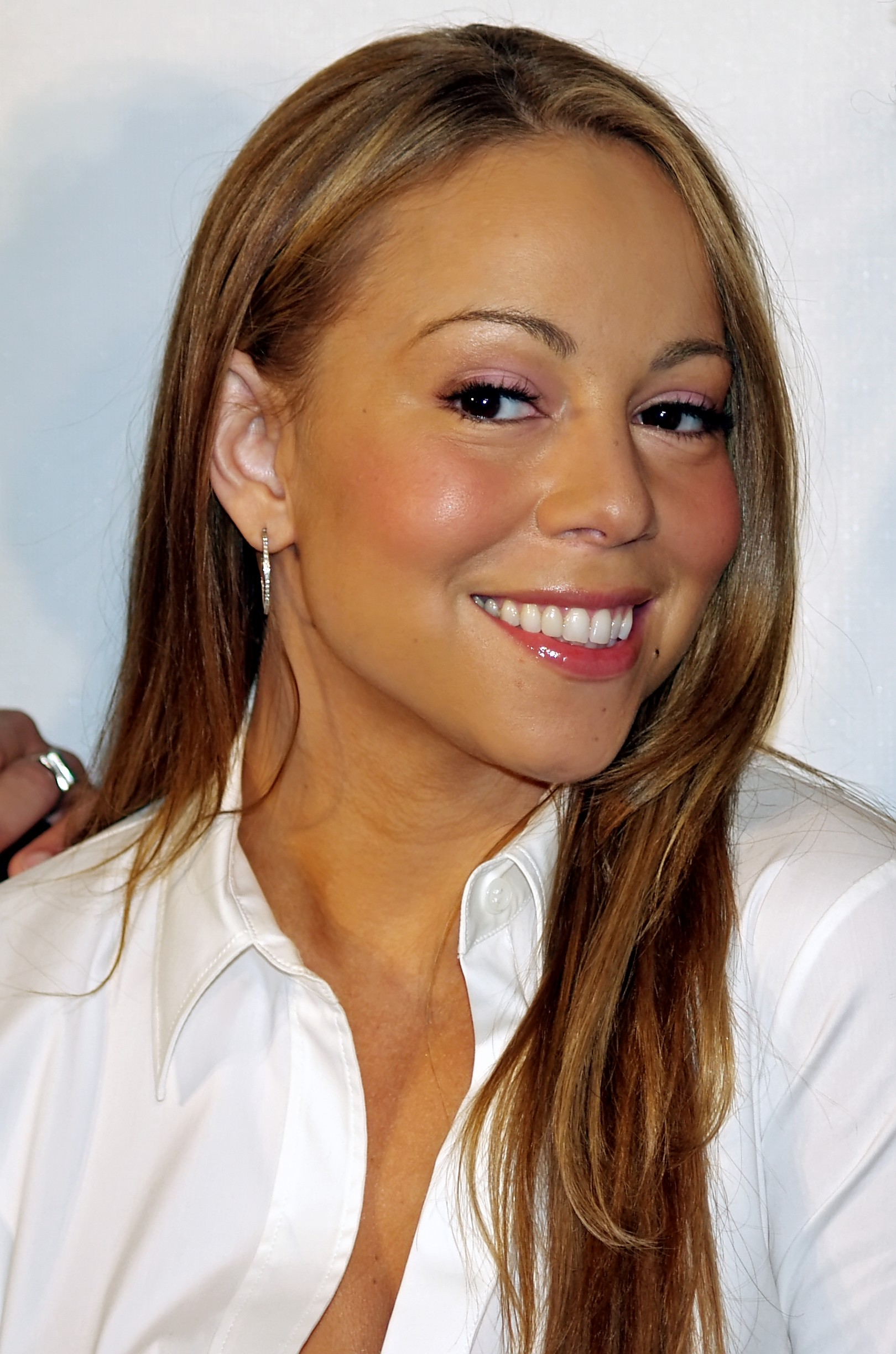
Rihanna's major influences include Madonna (left) and Mariah Carey (right).

Rihanna has identified Madonna as her idol and primary inspiration. She expressed her aspiration to become the "Black Madonna" and commended her talent for continually reinventing herself throughout her career. Rihanna praised Madonna's ability to change her fashion and music repeatedly, while remaining a "real force in entertainment". She also named Mariah Carey as a major influence on her music and career and recalled performing her 1993 song "Hero" at her high school talent show. Rihanna also said that Carey's "Vision of Love" (1990) was the song that inspired her to pursue a career in music. After moving to the US, she was exposed to a wide range of musical genres, which she said had a profound effect on her. Rihanna identified Brandy's fourth album, Afrodisiac (2004), as a primary source of inspiration for her album Good Girl Gone Bad.

In her youth, Rihanna often watched Bob Marley on television due to his popularity in the Caribbean. She deemed him one of her all-time favourite artists, crediting him with "pav[ing] the way for every other artist out of the Caribbean". She created a shrine in her home dedicated to Marley and has performed covers of both "Is This Love" (1978) and "Redemption Song" (1980) during her concert tours. As a child, Rihanna sang Whitney Houston songs and "A Whole New World" (1992) into her hairbrush so frequently that her neighbours started calling her "Robyn Redbreast". She also mentioned that one of the earliest songs she developed an affection for was Houston's rendition of "I Will Always Love You" (1992). She credits that song with sparking her passion for music and partly attributes her presence in the industry to Houston. Rihanna was also influenced by artists such as Janet Jackson, Aaliyah, Beyoncé, Celine Dion, Grace Jones, Lil' Kim, Prince, and Brandy.

=== Videography and stage ===
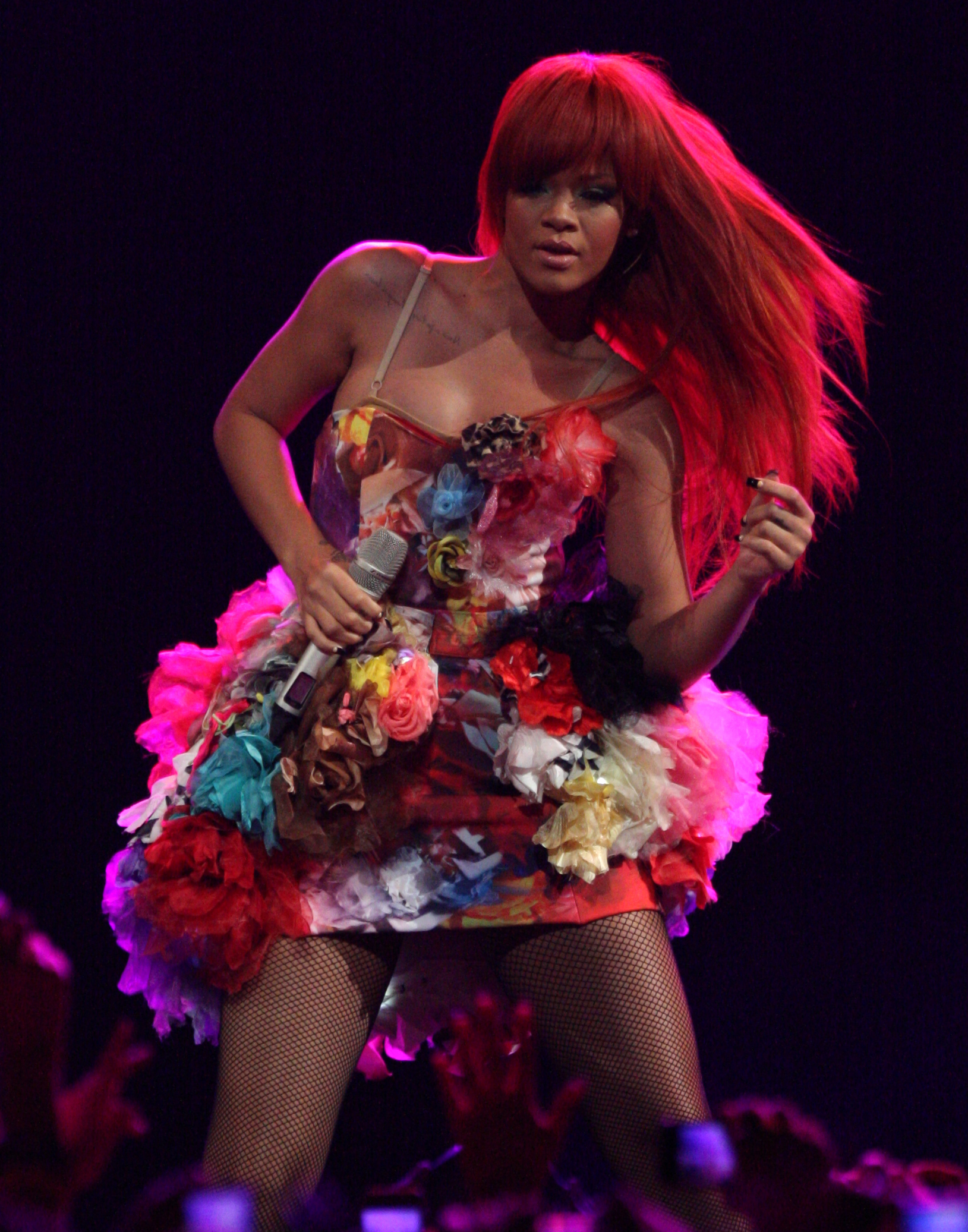
Rihanna on Last Girl on Earth tour in 2011. She has bright red hair, associated with the Loud era, and a multi-coloured dress.

Rihanna has worked with music video director Anthony Mandler on seventeen music videos, the first being "Unfaithful" (2006). Jocelyn Vena of MTV News observed that Rihanna often creates music videos that are thought-provoking and aligned with the themes of her songs. Jon Bream, writing for the Star Tribune, deemed her the video vixen of the 2000s, lauding her mastery of the pout, confident strut, and trend-setting hairstyles that draw attention from audiences on YouTube. InStyle's George Epaminondas described Rihanna's videos as cinematic and highlighted their island rhythms, pop sensibilities, and playful sensuality. Billboard ranked her eleventh on its list of "The 100 Greatest Music Video Artists of All Time" in 2020, stating that she "rarely shields her emotions, as she's always willing to unmask every side to her in her videos".

Many of her music videos were shot as short films exploring issues such as love triangles, abuse and substance abuse romance, including "We Found Love" and "Man Down". The former, portraying a turbulent, drug-fuelled romance, was condemned by the Rape Crisis Centre for what it considered a troubling message. The latter, which depicts Rihanna shooting a man in a train station, drew criticism from the Parents Television Council. Charne Graham of the Houston Press defended her, asking, "Why should Rihanna's music videos get everyone riled up when others' equally sexual and controversial videos are in rotation? [... S]he just like[s] to make music videos that give us something to talk about." Her music video for "Umbrella" shows Rihanna's transition into adulthood and her newly adopted image. The "dark, creepy" scenes of "Disturbia" have been compared to Michael Jackson's Thriller. In 2013, Rihanna became the first woman to pass two billion cumulative views on YouTube.

Rihanna's concerts frequently incorporate elaborate staging and choreography. Critics have commended her stage presence and her experimental stage costumes. Billboard readers ranked Rihanna's 2008 MTV Video Music Awards performance of "Disturbia" the tenth-best in the show's history. Reviewing the Good Girl Gone Bad Tour, The Times compared her stage wardrobe to that of Janet Jackson and described her as "a vision of Ann Summers couture in thigh-high boots and a few scraps of black PVC". She described her performance identity as distinct from her real self, calling it "a part I play. You know, like it's a piece of art, with all these toys and textures to play with".

== Public image ==
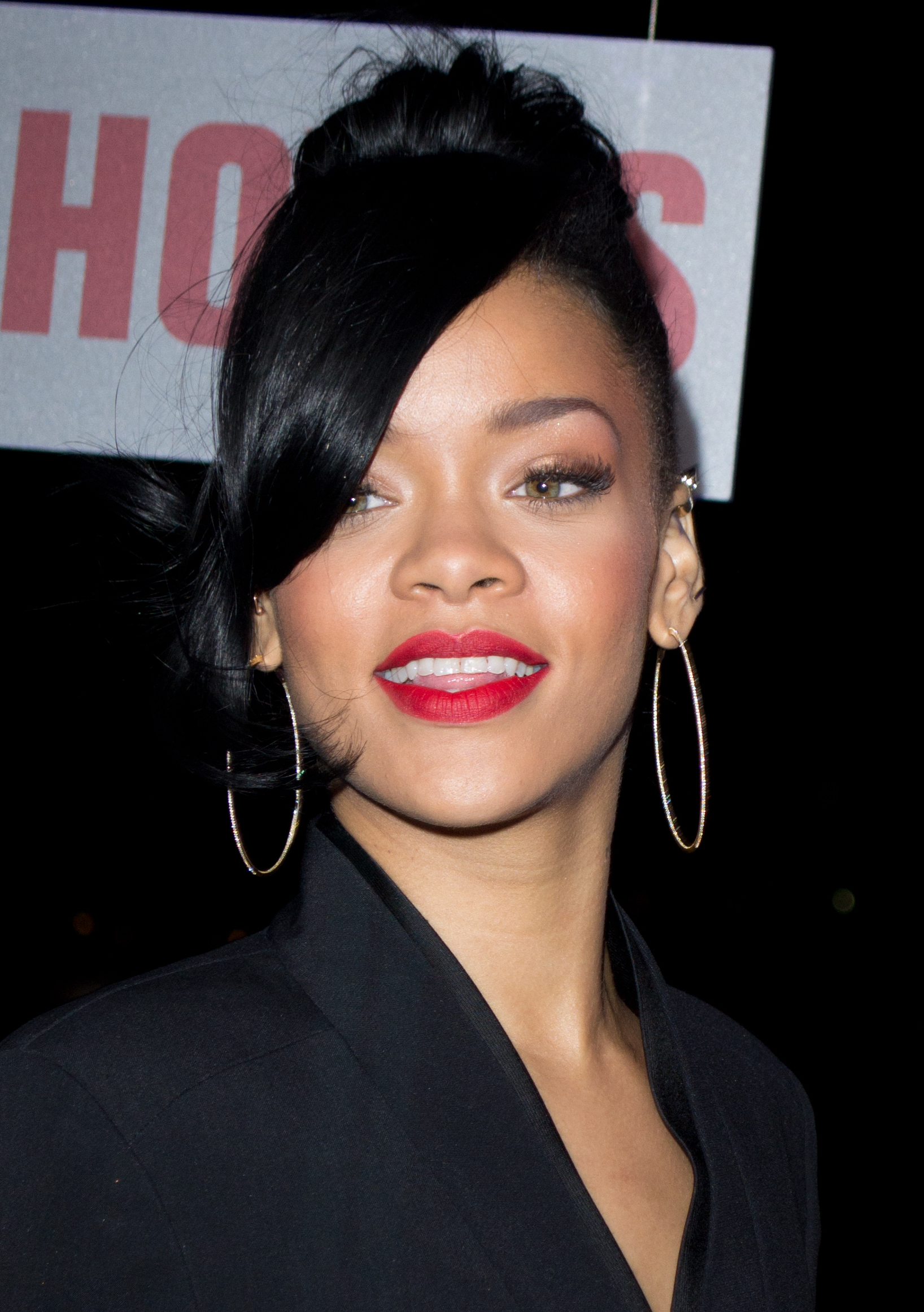
Rihanna at the Australian premiere of Battleship in 2012

Rihanna has been described by the media as a pop and fashion icon, particularly since the release of Good Girl Gone Bad (2007). Known for her changing style and image, Rihanna's music and fashion choices have been closely followed by the media. In 2009, New York magazine described her early look as that of "a cookie-cutter teen queen" and praised her ability to shift appearances with ease. Around the time of her second album A Girl Like Me (2006), critics often compared her style and sound to that of Beyoncé. When asked about the comparisons, Rihanna told Look magazine that while she admired Beyoncé and felt honoured to be mentioned alongside her, they were different performers with their own approaches. Speaking later with Oprah on Next Chapter, she explained that Def Jam's early attempts to mould her into a "pop princess" made her feel boxed in, saying the label had a clear image for her without first allowing her to find her own identity.

With the release of her third album Good Girl Gone Bad (2007), Rihanna abandoned her innocent image in favour of a sharper, edgier style. Her bob haircut, which became emblematic of the era, was inspired by Charlize Theron's look in the film Æon Flux (2005). Nico Amarca of Highsnobiety later observed that Rihanna had undergone "one of the most significant aesthetic metamorphoses the world ha[d] ever seen". Her appearance and fashion have changed repeatedly since then, and each shift has often become associated with her artistic identity. Rihanna has credited her mother as the earliest inspiration for her love of fashion, recalling how she admired her getting dressed as a child. She has said that her own approach to style is about taking risks and finding unusual silhouettes. Jess Cartner-Morley of The Guardian called her wardrobe "the most talked-about, influential and dissected in pop", stating that whatever she wears is quickly reproduced in mainstream fashion.

Rihanna has been described by critics as having sex appeal. She is often labelled as a sex symbol, a label she has said is flattering but also uncomfortable. She posed nude for the magazines Lui and Esquire, having also appeared on the covers of Maxim, FHM or Rolling Stone. In December 2012, Rihanna became the first woman featured on the cover of GQ's "Men of the Year" issue. She first attended the Met Gala in 2007 and has appeared several times since. Her 2015 appearance in a yellow Guo Pei gown – the omelette dress – drew massive attention online, generating over a billion impressions and inspiring a documentary, Yellow Is Forbidden (2018). Rihanna later co-chaired the 2018 gala, wearing Maison Margiela for the Heavenly Bodies theme. Through her fashion ventures, Rihanna has become one of the wealthiest musicians; in 2021, she became the richest female musician at the time, with a net worth of $1.7 billion. Forbes included her on its Celebrity 100 list in 2014, 2016, and 2017, and featured her on its list of the Top 100 Most Powerful Women of 2019. Active on social media, she ranked atop Forbes' 2012 list of "Social Networking Superstars".

== Achievements and impact ==
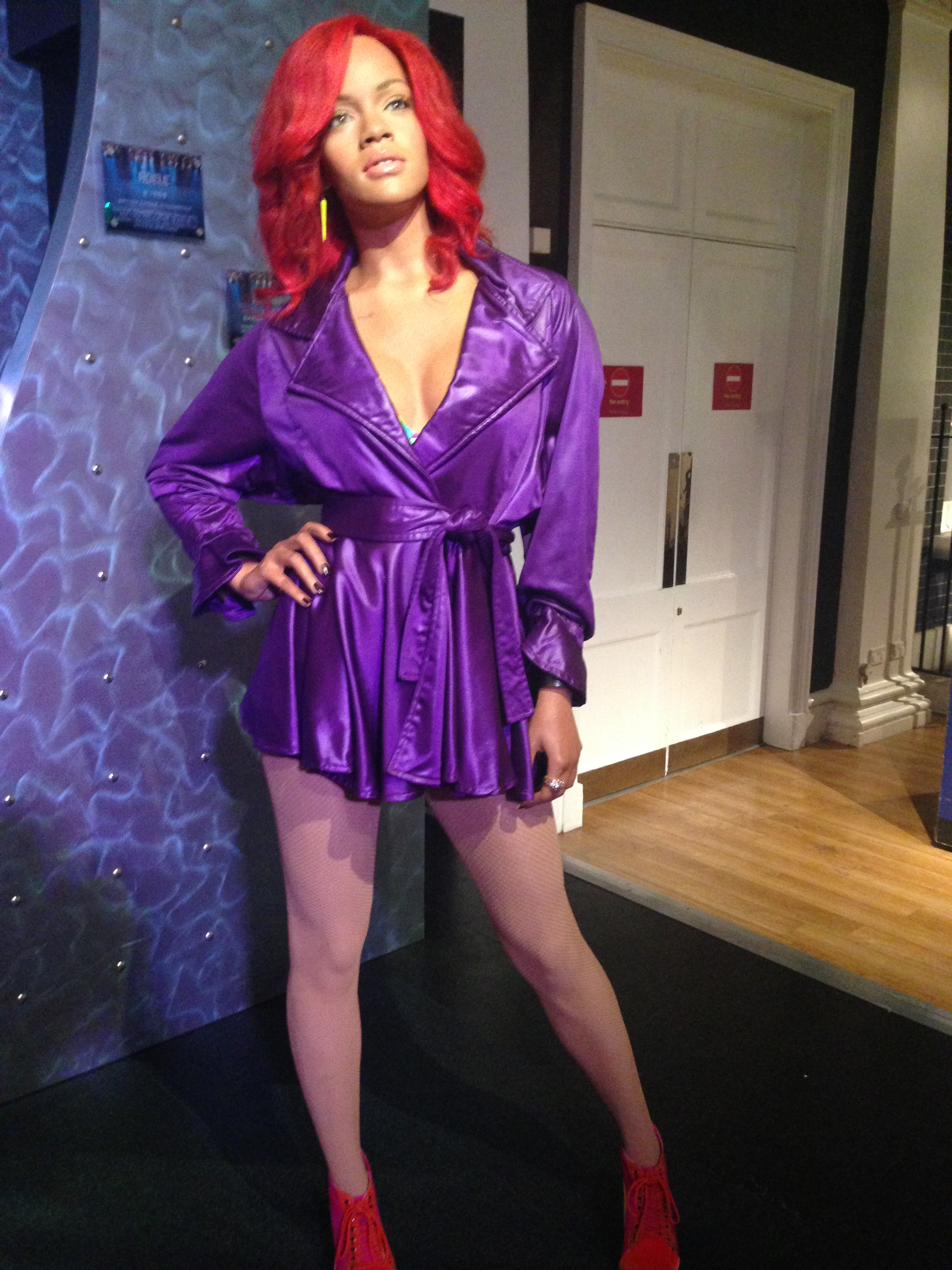
Waxwork of Rihanna at Madame Tussauds, London

With estimated worldwide sales exceeding 250 million records as of 2023, Rihanna is one of the best-selling music artists of all time. In 2012, she set a Guinness World Record as the best-selling digital artist in the US. In July 2015, the Recording Industry Association of America (RIAA) announced that Rihanna had surpassed 100 million gold and platinum song certifications, making her the artist with the most digital single sales and the first to exceed 100 million cumulative singles certifications. Her accolades include nine Grammy Awards, twelve Billboard Music Awards, and thirteen American Music Awards.

Rihanna has fourteen number-one singles on the US Billboard Hot 100 chart, tying her with Drake for the fourth most chart-topping songs in its history. In August 2018, Billboard ranked Rihanna as the tenth-most successful Hot 100 artist of all time. Rihanna has eight number-one singles on the Hot R&B/Hip-Hop Songs chart, seven on the Airplay chart, and sixteen on the Rhythmic chart. In the US, Rihanna has sold more than ten million albums. She has also earned nine number-one songs on the UK Singles Chart and ranks second to the Beatles for the most million-selling singles in the country.

Billboard named Rihanna the "Greatest Pop Star" of 2007 and 2012. The publication ranked her at number three on its list of the "Greatest Pop Stars of the 21st Century" (2024) and number two on its "Top 100 Women Artists of the 21st Century" (2025). Rolling Stone included her single "Umbrella" in its list of the "500 Greatest Songs of All Time" and her album Anti amongst the "500 Greatest Albums of All Time". Time named her one of the most influential people in the world in 2012 and 2018. Her work has influenced artists such as Lorde, Sam Smith, Billie Eilish, Selena Gomez, Ed Sheeran, Ellie Goulding, Kim Petras, Marilyn Manson, Jessie J, SZA, Ayra Starr, and Demi Lovato.

Several wax figures of Rihanna are found at Madame Tussauds Wax Museums in major cities around the world. She has been honoured with the title of Ambassador for Culture and Youth in Barbados. On February 22, 2008, Prime Minister David Thompson officially proclaimed "Rihanna Day" in Barbados, which—while not an official public holiday—is celebrated annually by locals in her honour. She was named "Humanitarian of the Year" by Harvard University's Foundation for Intercultural and Race Relations in 2017. The Barbadian government appointed her as an Ambassador Extraordinary and Plenipotentiary on September 20, 2018, with the duty of promoting education, tourism, and investment on the island. At the 2020 NAACP Image Awards, Rihanna received the President's Award from Derrick Johnson. He highlighted her multifaceted career, "from her business achievements through Fenty to her tremendous record as an activist and philanthropist". Prime Minister Mia Mottley declared Rihanna a National Hero of Barbados during the Republic ceremony on November 30, 2021.

== Other ventures ==
Rihanna has expanded into various business ventures and endorsements. In 2010, she featured in a Kodak advertisement alongside rapper Pitbull. That year, she released a photo book documenting the Last Girl on Earth tour, serving as a companion to her album Rated R (2009). In 2011, Rihanna was the face of Nivea and Vita Coco. Rihanna's first television program, Styled to Rock, premiered in the UK on Sky Living in August 2012. Over the ten-week series, she joined Nicola Roberts, Lysa Cooper, and Henry Holland to mentor emerging British designers on developing their clothing lines. The US adaptation of Styled to Rock debuted on Bravo in October 2013. In July 2013, Budweiser announced that Rihanna had joined their global Made For Music campaign, appearing alongside Jay-Z.

=== Business ventures ===
Rihanna's first fragrance, Reb'l Fleur, was released in January 2011. Rolling Stone deemed it a commercial success, projecting that it would generate US$80 million in retail sales by the end of the year. Her second fragrance, Rebelle, followed in December 2011. Director Anthony Mandler shot the promotional campaigns for both fragrances. In November 2012, she introduced her third fragrance, Nude. Her fourth women's scent, Rogue, debuted in September 2013; a men's version entitled Rogue Man launched in 2014. In 2013, Rihanna partnered with MAC Cosmetics to launch her own summer and fall makeup collections under the name RiRi Hearts MAC. In March 2015, Rihanna was announced as a co-owner of the music streaming platform Tidal, alongside several other artists. The service specializes in lossless audio and high-definition music videos. Including Beyoncé and Jay-Z, 16 artist stakeholders co-own Tidal, most of whom own a 3% equity stake. In 2016, it was confirmed that Rihanna would release her music through her own label, Westbury Road Entertainment, founded in 2005 and named after her childhood home in Barbados.

In November 2015, Rihanna partnered with Benoit Demouy to launch Fr8me, a Los Angeles-based beauty and stylist agency supporting artists with commercial bookings, photo shoots, campaigns, and red-carpet appearances. She also established a photography agency, A Dog Ate My Homework, representing photographers Erik Asla and Deborah Anderson. Early in her career, Rihanna expressed a strong interest in fashion and a desire to pursue clothing design, calling the former her "defence mechanism". In November 2011, she launched her first fashion venture in collaboration with Armani. By February 2013, she debuted her first women's fashion collection at London Fashion Week for the British brand River Island, working closely with her personal stylist, Adam Selman. Together, they released three additional collections for the brand. Rihanna went on to collaborate with numerous fashion houses, including Dior, Stance, and Manolo Blahnik. In March 2015, she became the first Black woman to be named the new face of Dior.

In 2014, Rihanna was named creative director of Puma's women's line, overseeing both apparel and footwear collaborations. The following year, she launched her first sneaker with the brand, which sold out online within three hours of its pre-sale. Over the next two years, she released a variety of footwear in different styles and colourways, all receiving positive responses from critics and consumers alike. In 2016, Rihanna debuted her first clothing line with Puma at New York Fashion Week, which was commercially successful, earning the company over $1 billion.

==== Fenty ====
In 2017, Rihanna launched her cosmetics line Fenty Beauty through LVMH's Kendo division, holding a 50% ownership stake. The $10 million partnership produced a wide range of beauty products, with the first collection released on September 8, 2017, in stores and online across more than 150 countries. It included an array of products including foundations, highlighters, bronzers, blush compacts, lip glosses, and blotting sheets, and was praised for offering shades that catered to all skin tones. Time named Fenty Beauty one of "The 25 Best Inventions of 2017", commending its inclusivity. The brand sparked what became known as the "Fenty Effect", as cosmetic companies across the industry began to expand their shade ranges to better serve diverse skin tones, with forty shades becoming the benchmark.

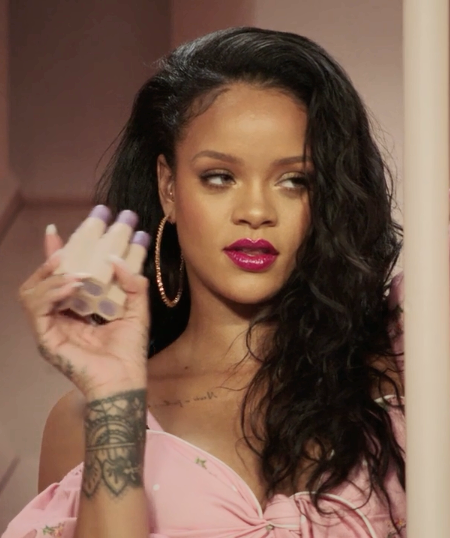
Rihanna in a promotional video for Fenty Beauty in 2018

In 2018, Rihanna launched the lingerie brand Savage X Fenty, designed as an inclusive label offering products in a wide range of shades and sizes. The line debuted at New York Fashion Week in September 2018 and was praised for its diversity, particularly for featuring plus-size models, though some critics felt larger sizes were still underrepresented. In September 2019, Savage X Fenty returned to New York Fashion Week with a show at the Barclays Center, featuring models such as Joan Smalls, Bella Hadid, and Cara Delevingne. It premiered on Amazon Prime Video that month as the Savage X Fenty Show, and was renewed as Vol. 2 in October 2020, Vol. 3 in September 2021, and Vol. 4 in November 2022. She stepped down as CEO in June 2023.

Rihanna launched the fashion brand Fenty under luxury group LVMH in May 2019. She became the first woman to create an original brand for LVMH and the first woman of colour to lead one of its houses. The line debuted in a Paris pop-up on May 22 before a worldwide online release seven days later, featuring clothing, accessories, and footwear. It was LVMH's first new fashion house since 1987. In February 2021, amid the effects of the COVID-19 pandemic, Rihanna and LVMH agreed to suspend the brand and focus on expanding the Savage X Fenty lingerie line. In July 2020, Rihanna introduced Fenty Skin, a skin care line debuting with a cleanser, toning serum, and moisturizer-sunscreen, designed to be gender-neutral and inclusive of all skin tones. In June 2024, she launched the hair care brand Fenty Hair, offering products formulated to suit all hair types, textures, and routines.

Rihanna exclusively uses her surname for ventures outside of music to keep her business and artistic identities separate. In January 2019, Rihanna filed a lawsuit against her father, Ronald Fenty, over the use of the Fenty name for commercial purposes. The lawsuit alleged that Rihanna's cosmetics brand, Fenty Beauty, was damaged commercially by her father's company, Fenty Entertainment, through misrepresentation of his company being affiliated with her. She dropped the lawsuit in September 2021.

=== Philanthropy ===
In 2006, Rihanna founded the Believe Foundation to support terminally ill children. In February 2008, she joined other public figures in designing clothing for H&M's Fashion Against AIDS campaign to raise awareness and combat HIV/AIDS. That same year, she performed a series of charity concerts called A Girl's Night Out to benefit the Believe Foundation. The events were free to the public, with funds from sponsors and advertisers directed toward providing medical supplies, school materials, and toys to children in need. In September 2008, Rihanna joined fifteen other female artists to record and perform the song "Just Stand Up!" during the Stand Up to Cancer television special. Proceeds from the single supported the fundraiser, which ultimately helped raise $100 million for cancer research.

Rihanna founded the Clara Lionel Foundation (CLF) in 2012, named after her grandparents, Clara and Lionel Braithwaite. The foundation funds groundbreaking education and emergency preparedness and response programs worldwide. The CLF frequently hosted Diamond Ball charity fundraiser events. The inaugural event in 2014 raised over $2 million, and the second raised over $3 million. In February 2012, Rihanna performed a benefit show at the House of Blues to raise money for the Children's Orthopaedic Center and the Mark Taper-Johnny Mercer Artists Program at Children's Hospital. In December, Rihanna gave a $100,000 food bank donation for Hurricane Sandy. In January 2014, Rihanna was part of the MAC Viva Glam campaign, which benefits women, men and children living with HIV/AIDS.

In March 2020, Rihanna donated $5 million to COVID-19 relief and followed that up with additional donations of personal protective equipment to the state of New York and an offer of $700,000 worth of ventilators to her home country Barbados. The next month, Rihanna donated $2.1 million—matching Twitter CEO Jack Dorsey for a total of $4.2 million—to provide support and resources to individuals and children suffering from domestic violence amidst the lockdown. In January 2022, Rihanna, through the CLF, donated $15 million to eighteen climate justice organisations across seven Caribbean nations and the US.

=== Advocacy ===
During her set at the NCAA March Madness Music Festival in February 2016, Rihanna voiced her opposition to Indiana's Religious Freedom Restoration Act, which permits companies and individuals to cite religious beliefs as a defence when accused of discrimination against LGBT people. Rihanna appeared alongside other celebrities in the online video "23 Ways You Could Be Killed If You Are Black in America" (2016), released in partnership with the We Are Here Movement to raise awareness about police brutality.

In January 2017, Rihanna participated in the Women's March in New York, which took place amongst protests the day after US President Donald Trump's inauguration. She later criticized Trump's immigration policies—particularly Executive Order 13769, which sought to bar entry from several Muslim-majority countries—as well as his response to the 2019 mass shootings in El Paso and Dayton. In October 2019, she stated that she declined to perform at the 2020 Super Bowl halftime show in support of Colin Kaepernick following the controversy surrounding his role in the national anthem protests. In February 2021, Rihanna voiced her support for the Indian farmers' protest against the farm bills on Twitter.

In 2022, Rihanna advocated for reforming the global financial system to better address climate change and poverty, including providing aid to nations most affected by climate-related crises. In 2024, Rihanna endorsed Kamala Harris during the US presidential election.

== Discography ==
- Music of the Sun (2005)
- A Girl Like Me (2006)
- Good Girl Gone Bad (2007)
- Rated R (2009)
- Loud (2010)
- Talk That Talk (2011)
- Unapologetic (2012)
- Anti (2016)

== Filmography ==
- Bring It On: All or Nothing (2006)
- Battleship (2012)
- This Is the End (2013)
- Home (2015)
- Valerian and the City of a Thousand Planets (2017)
- Ocean's 8 (2018)
- Guava Island (2019)
- Smurfs (2025)

== Tours ==
As a headliner

- Rihanna: Live in Concert (2006)
- Good Girl Gone Bad Tour (2007–2009)
- Last Girl on Earth Tour (2010–2011)
- Loud Tour (2011)
- Diamonds World Tour (2013)
- Anti World Tour (2016)

As a co-headliner

- The Monster Tour (with Eminem) (2014)

Promotional tours

- A Girl's Night Out (2008, a series of charity concerts to benefit the "Believe Foundation")
- 777 Tour (2012, in support of her Unapologetic album)

== See also ==
- Culture of Barbados
- Music of Barbados
- Honorific nicknames in popular music
- List of Billboard Social 50 number-one artists
- List of Billboard Hot 100 chart achievements and milestones

== Print sources ==
- Affuso, Elizabeth; Scott, Suzanne (2023). Sartorial Fandom. University of Michigan Press. ISBN 978-0-472-90338-2.
- Finley, Laura L. (2018). Violence in Popular Culture. Bloomsbury Publishing. ISBN 978-1-4408-5433-0.
- Ghadar, Fariborz (2022). The Danger of Devaluing Immigrants. Bloomsbury Publishing. ISBN 978-1-4408-7934-0.
- Goldsmith, Melissa Ursula Dawn; Fonseca, Anthony J. (2018). Hip Hop Around the World. Bloomsbury Publishing. ISBN 978-0-313-35759-6.
- Govan, Chloe (2011). Rihanna: Rebel Flower. Omnibus Press. ISBN 978-0-85712-744-0.
- Heatley, Michael; Betts, Graham (2012). Rihanna: Bad Girl. Flame Tree Publishing. ISBN 978-0-85775-275-8.
- Herringshaw, DeAnn (2014). Rihanna: Grammy-Winning Superstar. ABDO Publishing Company. ISBN 978-1-62968-025-5.
- LaBennett, Oneka (2024). Global Guyana. NYU Press. ISBN 978-1-4798-2702-2.
- Little, Clare Douglass (2020). Makeup in the World of Beauty Vlogging. Bloomsbury Publishing. ISBN 978-1-9787-9547-1.
- Madden, Emma (2025). Eternal Goth. Castle Books. ISBN 978-1-57715-526-3.
- Miller, Donald C. (2018). Coming of Age in Popular Culture. Bloomsbury Publishing. ISBN 978-1-4408-4061-6.
- Muehlhoff, Tim (October 18, 2010). Marriage Forecasting. InterVarsity Press. ISBN 978-0-8308-6825-4.
- Novic, Sara (2019). America Is Immigrants. Random House. ISBN 978-1-9848-1983-3.
- Oliver, Sarah (2011). Rihanna. Bonnier Publishing. ISBN 978-1-84358-423-0.
- Perricone, Kathleen (2025). Rihanna Is Life. Quarto Publishing. ISBN 978-0-7603-9497-7.
- Seabrook, John (2015). The Song Machine. Random House. ISBN 978-1-4481-9101-7.
- Tracy, Kathleen A. (2013). Superstars of the 21st Century. Bloomsbury Publishing. ISBN 979-8-216-15169-2.
- Vesey, Alyxandra (2024). Extending Play. Oxford University Press. ISBN 978-0-19-008563-6.
- Weidhase, Nathalie (2024). Pop & Postfeminism. Bloomsbury Publishing. ISBN 978-1-350-15803-0.

Diplomatic posts
Preceded by None	Barbadian Ambassador at-Large; 2018–present	Incumbent
