= Nude by Rihanna =

Fragrance for women by Rihanna

Fragrance by Rihanna
- Released: November 23, 2012
- Label: Parlux Fragrances
- Tagline: Wear it with nothing else
- Predecessor: Rebelle
- Successor: Rogue

Nude by Rihanna is the third fragrance for women by Barbadian singer Rihanna. The fragrance was released on November 23, 2012 (Black Friday), under the perfume line, Parlux Fragrances.

== Information ==
The fragrance is described as a sweet, floral [and] fruity fragrance with a vanilla background. It also consists of woody and skin musky notes. Fruity aromas of guava, mandarin and pear are located at the opening of the composition. The heart is blended out of white flowers: gardenia petals, velvety Sambac jasmine and creamy orange blossom. The base consists of sandalwood, vanilla orchid and "second skin" musk.

== Products ==
- 100 ml/ 3.4 oz
- 50 ml/ 1.7 oz
- 30 ml/ 1.0 oz
- 15 ml/ 0.5 oz
