= Gangstas Don't Live That Long =

Song by Snoop Dogg

from the album That's My Work Vol. 3
- Released: March 11, 2014
- Recorded: 2006
- Genre: West Coast hip hop, Gangsta Rap
- Length: 4:44
- Label: Doggystyle
- Songwriter: Calvin Broadus
- Producer: Mr. Porter

"Gangstas Don't Live That Long" is a song by American rapper Scarface, remixed by Snoop Dogg on his Mixtape That's My Work Vol. 3, and Producer by Mr. Porter.

== Music video ==
The music video was released on March 11, 2014 and shows the day Gangstas. The music video has surpassed 17 million views on YouTube (Aug. 2021).
