= Reb'l Fleur =

2011 fragrance by Rihanna

Fragrance by Rihanna
- Released: January 25, 2011
- Label: Parlux Fragrances
- Tagline: Bad feels so good
- Successor: Rebelle
- Website: Perfumes by Rihanna

Reb'l Fleur is the first fragrance for women endorsed by Barbadian singer Rihanna. The fragrance was promoted with the accompanying tagline "Bad feels so good". Reb'l Fleur was released in the United States on January 25, 2011, and in the United Kingdom on August 19, 2011. The product was positively received upon its release, and it became highly successful.

== Background ==
In 2009, Jay-Z signed a deal with Parlux Fragrances that involved launching scents for Kanye West and Rihanna. In reference to the deal, Jay-Z stated "We are excited for the opportunity to partner with Parlux and their management team in the launch of these dynamic new brands".

According to Frederick E. Purches, the founder of Parlux Fragrances, when perfume designers first met with Rihanna, they commented on her "unique scent". Rihanna disclosed to the designers that she had created it by mixing and layering five different scents. The perfume designers then analyzed the five fragrances and incorporated them into the final formula for the Reb'l Fleur fragrance.

== Promotion ==
The official promotional and interactive video for Reb'l Fleur was directed by Anthony Mandler and released on February 11, 2011. The commercial features Rihanna taking a walk through a garden maze and interacting with a "tuxedo-clad seducer." James Dinh from MTV reacted positively to the commercial, which had a duration of two minutes, lauding Rihanna for "creating an ultra-sexy and sleek atmosphere".

Billboards advertising the fragrance were scheduled for month-long runs; one began on February 7, 2011, on Sunset Boulevard in Los Angeles, while another began running in Times Square on February 14, 2011. Beginning in April, 2011, an edited 30-second version of the promotional video for Reb'l Fleur was scheduled to be screened in 363 movie theaters for three months. Representatives for the fragrance had planned to hand moviegoers scented cards as they exited the theaters.

Rihanna made an in-store appearance at the Macy's Department Store in Lakewood, California, for the official launch of Reb'l Fleur on February 18, 2011. The fragrance was also heavily marketed via social media platforms such as Facebook and Twitter. On August 19, 2011, Rihanna officially launched the perfume in the United Kingdom at the House of Fraser.

== Information ==
"My grandmother in Barbados used to call me her Rebel Flower, over the years, I layered many different scents to get something that was truly my own. But I wanted…something that said 'Rihanna was here.' Something delicious and special, a fragrance with subtle hints that linger and leave a sexy memory."
- Rihanna speaks to People about Reb'l Fleur.

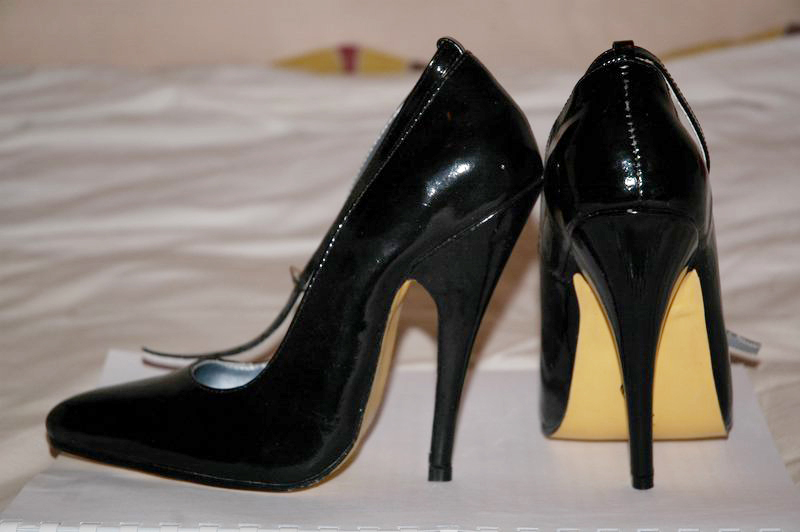
The fragrance bottle was modeled after the design of a stiletto heel.

Reb'l Fleur was officially released in the United States on January 25, 2011. It was exclusively released at Macy's Department Stores. The product is sold in 1.7 and 3.4 fluid ounce bottles at a retail price of $49.00 and $59.00 respectively. The collection also features a bottle of body lotion, which is sold at a retail price of $30.00. Reb'l Fleur products are also available online through Macy's official website.

=== Packaging and scent ===
Reb'l Fleur's scent is fresh with ripe fruits and sumptuous florals. It also includes a "musky mix of vanilla, patchouli and amber". The bottle, which was designed to be "as dramatically unique as a Rihanna performance", was inspired by the shape of a stiletto heel due to Rihanna's fondness for them. The side of the bottle features a twisting matte black "ribbon".

== Reception ==
Reb'l Fleur was positively received by critics upon its release and distribution. Catherine Helbig from About.com called the fragrance "sexy and memorable," commenting that "Reb’l Fleur is as much in tune with Barbados-born Rihanna’s roots as it is with the glamour of her present life in New York City." Helbig concluded her review by praising the fragrance bottle, describing it as "edgy" with "an extra touch of glam." Melanie Dee from Yahoo! called the fragrance "a complete winner in [her] book" and concluded that if "Rihanna keeps pumping out scents this good, I will have a new favorite in the celebrity scent department." According to Rolling Stone, Reb'l Fleur was a financial success, expecting to gross a total of US$80 million at retail by the end of 2011.
