= That's My Work 3 =

Mixtape by Snoop Dogg
- Released: February 27, 2014
- Recorded: 2014
- Genre: Hip hop
- Label: Doggystyle

Snoop Dogg chronology
7 Days of Funk (2013)	That's My Work 3 (2014)	That's My Work 4 (2014)

That's My Work 3 is a mixtape by American rapper Snoop Dogg, hosted by DJ Drama. It was released free for digital download on February 27, 2014 and includes 20 songs. It is the third mixtape in the That's My Work series.

== Track listing ==
No.	Title	Producer(s)	Length
1.	"Pop Pop Bang" (with Daz)	Rick Rock
2.	"Happy Birthday" (with Daz)
3.	"Dick Walk" (DPGC)	TONEBONEBEATS
4.	"Full of That Shit"	1500 or Nothin'
5.	"Never Had It Like This" (featuring Warren G, T Fly)
6.	"Phenomenon" (with Daz)
7.	"On Edge" (Kali Uchis featuring Snoop Dogg)	League of Starz
8.	"Talkin' Loud"	League of Starz
9.	"Weed n Wax" (Soopafly featuring Snoop Dogg)	Soopafly
10.	"Cadillacs"	Madlib
11.	"Around the World" (with Daz)	Dae One
12.	"Miss Everything"
13.	"What's Yo Pleasure" (with Daz)	Dâm-Funk
14.	"Ain't Nobody" (featuring Mario)
15.	"Terradectacal"	Rick Rock
16.	"Ain't It Man" (featuring Kokane, Black Hef, E-White)
17.	"Feel Like Heaven" (featuring Soopafly)	Nottz
18.	"Freestyle" (with Kurupt)
19.	"Happy Birthday Pt. 2" (featuring Pooh Bear)	Scott Storch
20.	"Gangstas Don't Live That Long"	Mr. Porter
