= Alison Mears =

American architect

- Education: Australian National University; University of Canberra; Columbia University
- Occupation: Architect

Alison Mears is a certified AIA LEED AP Architect and is the current head of the Healthy Materials Lab at Parsons The New School for Design. Mears was previously the director of the BFA Architecture and Interior Design Programs in the School of Constructed Environments and an assistant professor of architecture at Parsons.

== Education ==
Mears received her undergraduate degree in science from the Australian National University, her Bachelor of Architecture degree from the University of Canberra and a master's in architecture from Columbia University.

== Career ==
Her prior professional experience has been with Pei Cobb Freed & Partners Architects, and Mitchell/Giurgola and Thorp Architects. Mears currently manages her own office, Paci+Mears Architects in Brooklyn, New York, where she works on small-scale residential and commercial projects. While running her own practice, she has also directed the BFA Architecture and Interior Design programs at Parsons the New School for Design and is the current dean of the School of Design Strategies at Parsons The New School for Design, where she teaches many community-based studio courses in New Orleans, Washington, D.C., Warren, Ohio, and Skid Row, Los Angeles.

== Notable projects ==
=== With Pei Cobb Freed & Partners Architects ===
- Ronald Reagan Building and International Trade Center, Washington D.C.
- Friedrichstraße Passagen Office and Retail complex, Berlin
- Canary Wharf-Canada Square Office Tower, London
- Beatrixkwartier Office and Retail Complex, The Hague
- John F. Kennedy Airport Central Terminal Complex in New York City

=== With Mitchell/Giurgola and Thorp Architects ===
- Parliament House, Canberra

== Publications ==
- Mears, Alison. Seeking Shelter- An Investigation into Solutions for the Homeless. Jun 14 2012. ISBN 9781477499207.
- Mears, Alison, ed. INTEGRAL CITY: A collaborative design approach to downtown Greensboro, NC. Jun 2013.
