= Rated R: Remixed =

Remix album by Rihanna
- Released: May 24, 2010
- Recorded: 2009
- Length: 52:51
- Labels: SRP; Def Jam
- Producer: Chew Fu

Rihanna chronology
| Rated R (2009) | Rated R: Remixed (2010) | Loud (2010) |

Rated R: Remixed is the second remix album by Barbadian singer Rihanna. It was released on May 8, 2010, in Brazil and Europe and on May 24, 2010, in the United States by Def Jam Recordings and SRP Records. It contains remixes from her fourth studio album, Rated R (2009). The songs were solely remixed by Chew Fu. The majority of the remixes were remastered to incorporate influences from the genre of house music, and incorporate heavy usage of synthesizers as part of their instrumentation.

Rated R: Remixed received a mixed review from Jean Goon for MSN Entertainment. She praised Fu for remixing some of the dark and sombre songs into upbeat dance songs, but criticized the album as it did not provide memorability. The album peaked at number four in Greece and number six on the US Dance/Electronic Albums chart; it peaked at number 33 on the US Top R&B/Hip-Hop Albums chart and number 158 on the US Billboard 200 chart. As of July 2010, Rated R: Remixed has sold 13,000 copies in the US, according to Nielsen SoundScan.

== Background and release ==
Following the release and success of Rated R (2009) and its singles "Russian Roulette", "Hard" and "Rude Boy", it was confirmed on April 14, 2010, by Def Jam Recordings that Rihanna was going to release her second remix album entitled Rated R: Remixed. The singer's first remix album was Good Girl Gone Bad: The Remixes in January 2009. The project was announced as something for fans to bridge the gap while Rihanna was still on the Last Girl on Earth Tour (2010–11) and her fifth studio album, Loud, was not yet released. Rated R: Remixed was exclusively remixed by New York-based electronic record producer, remixer and DJ, Chew Fu. Although the track list on Rated R consists of 13 songs, Rated R: Remixed consists of 10 songs; "Cold Case Love", "The Last Song" and "Te Amo" were not remixed by Fu and were therefore not included. Rated R: Remixed was released on May 8, 2010, in Brazil and various European territories in a digital download format. It was released in the same format on May 24, in the United States.

== Composition and reception ==
"Wait Your Turn (Chew Fu Can't Wait No More Fix)"
A 26 second sample of "Wait Your Turn (Chew Fu Can't Wait No More Fix)". Originally a dubstep and hip hop song, Fu remixed the track into a house song.

Rated R: Remixed includes elements of house music. "Russian Roulette", "Photographs", "Rude Boy" and "Stupid in Love" feature "heavy electro and synth beats". "Wait Your Turn", originally a dubstep and hip hop song, was remastered to a house song. "Stupid in Love", which was originally a pop and R&B power ballad, was also changed to an uptempo house track.

== Critical reception ==
Jean Goon for MSN Entertainment gave a mixed review for the album, and awarded it 2.5 stars out of five. Goon was complimentary of how Fu changed some of the more sombre and downtempo songs to incorporate "catchy, upbeat touches." She noted that Goon noted that "Photographs" had undergone a "groovy" transformation, and that the composition complemented Rihanna's vocal performance. With regard to "Stupid in Love", Goon described the remix as "classy enough to be played in a trendy boutique or cafe."

However, Goon was critical of "Russian Roulette"'s production, writing that Fu appeared to have "got a little carried away" and criticising him for applying electro beats to every song, not all of which may have needed them. The critic noted that "Russian Roulette" was a "mess to listen to." With regard to "Rude Boy", originally an uptempo dance song that incorporates elements of the dancehall, ragamuffin, pop and R&B genres, Goon stated that Fu's production was an attempt to try and "outdo the already upbeat original." Goon concluded although she thought some of the remixes "weren't too bad on the ears," there were not any outstanding or memorable tracks. Furthermore, Goon criticised the remixes for being too heavily distorted with electronic synths which "seemed to compete for our attention rather than complement Rihanna’s vocals."

== Commercial performance ==
In Greece, Rated R: Remixed debuted at number 11 on May 17, 2010. The following week, the album peaked at number four. The album spent a total of two weeks on the album chart. In the United States, the album debuted and peaked at number 158 on the Billboard 200 on June 12, 2010. The album stayed on the chart for one week. Rated R: Remixed debuted and peaked at number six on the US Dance/Electronic Albums on June 12, and stayed on the chart for 11 weeks. It debuted and peaked at number 33 on the US Top R&B/Hip-Hop Albums on June 12, and stayed on the chart for 13 weeks. As of July 2010, Rated R: Remixed has sold 13,000 copies in the US, according to Nielsen SoundScan.

== Track listing ==
Credits adapted from the liner notes of Rated R: Remixed.

Rated R: Remixed track listing
| No. | Title | Writer(s) | Producer(s) | Length |
|---|---|---|---|---|
| 1. | "Mad House" (Chew Fu Straight Jacket Fix) | Makeba Riddick; Will Kennard; Saul Milton; Robyn Fenty | Chase & Status; Riddick^{[a]}; Chew Fu^{[b]} | 2:12 |
| 2. | "Russian Roulette" (Chew Fu Black Russian Fix) | Shaffer Smith; Charles Harmon | Chuck Harmony; Ne-Yo^{[c]}; Riddick^{[a]}; Chew Fu^{[b]} | 5:55 |
| 3. | "Rockstar 101" (Chew Fu Teachers Pet Fix) | Terius "The-Dream" Nash; C. "Tricky" Stewart; Fenty | Stewart; Nash; Riddick^{[a]}; Chew Fu^{[b]} | 4:27 |
| 4. | "Wait Your Turn" (Chew Fu Can't Wait No More Fix) | James Fauntleroy II; Mikkel S. Eriksen; Tor Erik Hermansen; Kennard; Milton; Takura Tendayi; Fenty | StarGate; Chase & Status; Eriksen^{[a]}; Chew Fu^{[b]} | 5:09 |
| 5. | "Photographs" (featuring will.i.am) (Chew Fu 35mm Fix) | William Adams; Jean Baptiste; Michael McHenry; Allan Pineda | will.i.am; Free School^{[d]}; Chew Fu^{[b]} | 5:59 |
| 6. | "Rude Boy" (Chew Fu Vitamin S Fix) | Eriksen; Hermansen; Ester Dean; Riddick; Rob Swire; Fenty | StarGate; Swire; Riddick^{[a]}; Chew Fu^{[b]} | 5:41 |
| 7. | "Hard" (featuring Jeezy) (Chew Fu Granite Fix) | Nash; Stewart; Fenty; Jay Jenkins | Stewart; Nash; Riddick^{[a]}; Chew Fu^{[b]} | 5:28 |
| 8. | "G4L" (Chew Fu Guns in the Air Fix) | Kennard; Milton; Fauntleroy II; Fenty | Chase & Status; Riddick^{[a]}; Chew Fu^{[b]} | 5:26 |
| 9. | "Fire Bomb" (Chew Fu Molotov Fix) | Fauntleroy II; Brian Kennedy Seals; Fenty | Brian Kennedy; Riddick^{[a]}; Chew Fu^{[b]} | 6:58 |
| 10. | "Stupid in Love" (Chew Fu Small Room Fix) | Smith; Eriksen; Hermansen | StarGate; Ne-Yo^{[c]}; Riddick^{[a]}; Chew Fu^{[b]} | 5:32 |
| Total length: | | | | 52:51 |

=== Notes ===
- ^{^[a]} signifies a vocal producer
- ^{^[b]} signifies a remixer
- ^{^[c]} signifies a co-producer
- ^{^[d]} signifies an additional producer
- Hong Kong version replaces track 6 with the Chew Fu Bumbaclot Fix of "Rude Boy".

== Personnel ==
Credits for Rated R: Remixed adapted from Allmusic.

- Mykael Alexander – assistant
- Beardyman – vocals
- Jessie Bonds – guitar
- Jay Brown – A&R
- Bobby Campbell – assistant
- Chase & Status – producer, musician
- Chew Fu – Programming, Remix Producer, Remixing
- James J. Cooper III – celli, soloist
- Cédric Culnaërt – assistant engineer
- Tyler Van Dalen – assistant engineer
- Kevin "KD" Davis – mixing
- Steven Dennis – assistant engineer
- Dylan Dresdow – mixing
- Mikkel S. Eriksen – engineer, vocal producer, musician
- James Fauntleroy II – background vocals
- Glenn Fischbach – celli
- Paul Foley – engineer
- Rick Friedrich – assistant engineer
- Future Cut – keyboards
- Mariel Haenn – stylist
- Alex Haldi – design
- Kevin Hanson – assistant
- Chuck Harmony – producer
- Keith Harris – strings
- Ben Harrison – guitar, additional production
- Karl Heilbron – vocal engineer
- Simon Henwood – art direction, design, photography, stylist
- Tor Erik Hermansen – musician
- Jean-Marie Horvat – mixing
- Ghazi Hourani – mixing assistant
- Jaycen Joshua – mixing
- Mike Johnson – engineer
- JP Robinson – art direction, design, photography
- Brian Kennedy – keyboards, programming, producer
- Padraic Kerin – engineer
- Olga Konopelsky – violin
- Emma Kummrow – violin
- Giancarlo Lino – mixing assistant
- Pater Martinez – assistant
- Luigi Mazzocchi – violin, soloist
- Monte Neuble – keyboards
- Terius Nash – producer
- Luis Navarro – assistant engineer
- Shaffer Smith – producer
- Jared Newcomb – mixing assistant
- Peter Nocella – viola
- Chris "Tek" O'Ryan – engineer
- Anthony Palazzole – mixing assistant
- Paper-Boy – additional production
- Ciarra Pardo – art direction, design
- Charles Parker – violin
- Ross "Dights" Parkin – assistant engineer
- Daniel Parry – assistant
- Kevin Porter – assistant
- Antonio Reid – executive producer
- Antonio Resendiz – assistant
- Makeba Riddick – background vocals, vocal producer
- Rihanna – executive producer, art direction, design
- Montez Roberts – assistant engineer
- Evan Rogers – executive producer
- Sébastien Salis – assistant engineer
- Jason Sherwood – assistant engineer
- Tyran "Ty Ty" Smith – A&R
- Caleb Speir – bass
- Stargate – producer
- Status – producer
- Xavier Stephenson – assistant
- Christopher "Tricky" Stewart – producer
- Tim Stewart – guitar
- Bernt Rune – stray guitar
- Carl Styrken – executive producer
- Rob Swire – musician
- Igor Szwec – violin
- Sean Tallman – engineer
- Marcos Taylor – engineer
- Gregory Teperman – violin
- Brian "B-Luv" Thomas – engineer
- Pat Thrall – engineer
- Marcos Tovar – engineer
- Neil Tucker – assistant, guitar engineer
- Ellen Von Unwerth – photography
- Alain Whyte – acoustic guitar
- Andrew Wuepper – engineer
- Ys – producer

== Charts ==
| Chart (2010) | Peak position |
|---|---|
| Greek Albums Chart | 4 |
| US Billboard 200 | 158 |
| US Dance/Electronic Albums | 6 |
| US Top R&B/Hip-Hop Albums | 33 |

== Release history ==
| Region | Date | Format | Label |
|---|---|---|---|
| Brazil | May 8, 2010 | Digital download | Def Jam Recordings |
| Finland | May 8, 2010 | Digital download | Def Jam Recordings |
| Germany | May 8, 2010 | Digital download | Def Jam Recordings |
| Hungary | May 8, 2010 | Digital download | Def Jam Recordings |
| The Netherlands | May 8, 2010 | Digital download | Def Jam Recordings |
| Portugal | May 8, 2010 | Digital download | Def Jam Recordings |
| Spain | May 8, 2010 | Digital download | Def Jam Recordings |
| Sweden | May 8, 2010 | Digital download | Def Jam Recordings |
| Switzerland | May 8, 2010 | Digital download | Def Jam Recordings |
| United States | May 24, 2010 | Digital download | Def Jam Recordings |
