= Stupid in Love =

Song by Rihanna

from the album Rated R
- Recorded: 2009
- Studio: Metropolis (London)
- Genre: R&B
- Length: 4:01
- Label: Def Jam; SRP
- Songwriters: Shaffer Smith; Mikkel S. Eriksen; Tor Erik Hermansen
- Producers: StarGate; Ne-Yo; Makeba Riddick

Audio video
- "Stupid in Love" on YouTube

"Stupid in Love" is a song recorded by Barbadian singer Rihanna for her fourth studio album, Rated R (2009). The song was written by R&B singer Ne-Yo and pop producer duo StarGate, with the duo also handling production. Ne-Yo served as the assistant producer, and Makeba Riddick as vocal producer. It was written two days before Rihanna and then boyfriend Chris Brown's altercation on the night of the 2009 Grammy Awards, which occurred on February 8, 2009. The lyrical content, which describes an abusive relationship, led Ne-Yo to describe the song as a "premonition".

"Stupid in Love" is a R&B power ballad. Instrumentation is provided by finger snapping, minor piano keys and piano riffs. The lyrics of the song revolve around a female protagonist who realizes that she needs to escape an abusive and adulterous boyfriend. "Stupid in Love" received a mixed to positive response from music critics. Some critics praised Rihanna's emotional delivery of the song whereas others criticized it as being overly dark. Upon the release of Rated R, the song peaked at number seven on the South Korea Gaon International Chart on December 27, 2009.

== Background and development ==
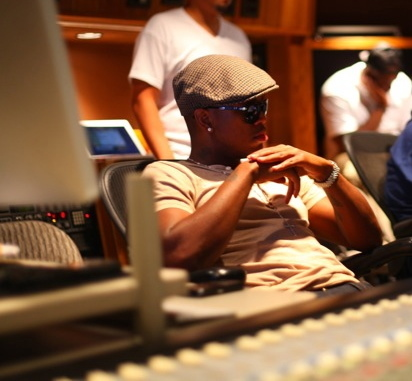
Co-writer of the song Ne-Yo stated that "Stupid in Love", which contains lyrics associated with domestic violence, was written two days before Rihanna and Chris Brown's altercation on the night of the 2009 Grammy Awards, which occurred on February 8, 2009.

"Stupid in Love" was written by Shaffer Smith, under his stage name Ne-Yo, and Mikkel S. Eriksen and Tor Erik Hermansen, under their production name StarGate. Ne-Yo served as the assistant producer. The song was recorded in 2009 at Metropolis Studios, London. On February 8, 2009, Rihanna's scheduled performance at the 2009 Grammy Awards was cancelled. Reports later surfaced regarding an alleged altercation with then boyfriend, singer Chris Brown, who was arrested on suspicion of making criminal threats. On March 5, 2009, Brown was charged with assault and making criminal threats. In the months that proceeded the altercation, both Rihanna and Brown kept low profiles and avoided media attention.

In an interview for MTV News, co-writer of "Stupid in Love" Ne-Yo, who had collaborated with Rihanna on her previous albums A Girl like Me (2006) and Good Girl Gone Bad (2007), clarified that he would not write a song for Rihanna with regard to Brown as he found it unnecessary and because of his friendship with Brown. Producer Chuck Harmony concurred with Ne-Yo's statement, saying that no matter what song Rihanna released as the lead single people would immediately think that the song is about Brown. In an interview with USA Today, Ne-Yo later revealed that the song was written two days before Rihanna and Brown's altercation, citing it as "a premonition." In an interview with Sway Calloway for MTV News at Rated R's preview in New York City, Rihanna stated that the album represented her honesty and vulnerability. During the preview, Calloway noted that "Stupid in Love" was the song most likely to receive comparisons to Brown, with emphasis on the lyric "I still love you, but I can't do this/ I may be dumb but I'm not stupid."

== Composition ==
"Stupid in Love" is a R&B power ballad which lasts for 4:01 (four minutes, one second). Instrumentation is provided by finger snapping, minor piano keys and piano riffs, a style of repeated chord progression. The lyrics of "Stupid in Love" revolve around a woman in an abusive and adulterous relationship, progressing to the female protagonist leaving her boyfriend. The song begins with the line "Let me tell you somethin' / Never / Have I ever / Been a size 10 in my whole life." Rihanna sings the line "This is stupid / I'm not stupid / Don't talk to me / Like I'm stupid" during the chorus. The bridge consists of Rihanna singing "Trying to make this work / but you act like a jerk." As noted by Rob Harvilla of The Village Voice, the bridge represents the moment when Rihanna realizes that it is not worth her while to stay in the relationship, writing "the dunce cap is off". "Stupid in Love" contains a lyrical metaphor, "Blood on your hands."

== Critical reception ==
"Stupid in Love" garnered mixed to positive reviews from music critics. Leah Greenblatt for Entertainment Weekly praised Rihanna's high level of emotional conviction on "Stupid in Love", writing that it is a piece of "self-lacerating balladry." Neil McCormick for The Daily Telegraph thought that the song was a direct reference to Rihanna and Brown, writing "Rihanna notoriously received a black eye prior to the 2009 Grammy awards when she was attacked by her then boyfriend, R&B singer Chris Brown. Clearly, this is a potentially life-changing incident, and we get some sense of the emotional aftermath on the ballad Stupid In Love." Norman Mayers for Nu-Soul Magazine concurred with McCormick, writing that Rihanna does not shy away from what happened between herself and Brown, rather, she confronts it directly on "Stupid in Love". Alex Thornton for HipHopDX wrote that it is difficult to listen to the song without thinking of "you know who," referring to Brown.

Michaelangelo Matos for The A.V. Club wrote that "Stupid in Love" sounded more like a therapy sessions than a song. Ryan Dombal of Pitchfork Media was critical of the song, labeling it as "quite-dim." Emily Tartanella for Popmatters was not impressed by the song, writing "'Stupid in Love' might be aiming for something more, but they arrive at something less." Chris Richards for The Washington Post wrote that "Stupid in Love", along with the lead single released from the album "Russian Roulette", consisted of "plodding beats" and "forgettable hooks". Richards continued in his review to write that the song is about "heavyhearted confessions to the treacliest of melodies." Eric Henderson for Slant Magazine was critical of the first six songs on Rated R ("Mad House", "Wait Your Turn", "Hard", "Stupid in Love", "Rockstar 101" and "Russian Roulette") were "grim and relentless."

== Track listing ==
- Album version
1. "Stupid in Love" – 4:01
- Remix version
1. "Stupid in Love" (Chew Fu Small Room Fix) – 5:32

== Credits and personnel ==
=== Personnel ===
- Songwriting – Shaffer Smith, Tor Erik Hermansen, Mikkel S. Eriksen
- Production – StarGate
- Production assistant – Smith
- Vocal production – Makeba Riddick
- Instruments – Hermansen, Eriksen
- Recording – Marcos Tovar
- Recording assistant – Ross Parkin
- Mixing – Kevin "KD" Davis
- Mixing assistant – Anthony Palazzole

=== Recording ===
- Recorded at Metropolis Studios, London;
- Mixed at Chung King Studios, New York City

Credits adapted from the liner notes of Rated R, Def Jam Recordings.

== Charts ==
Upon the release of Rated R, "Stupid in Love" debuted at number eight on the South Korea Gaon International Chart on December 27, 2009. The following week, it peaked at number seven for two consecutive weeks.

Chart (2010)	Peak position
South Korea Gaon International Chart	7
