= Rated R (Rihanna album) =

Studio album by Rihanna
- Released: November 20, 2009
- Recorded: March–November 2009
- Studios: The Boom Boom Room (Burbank, California); Chalice Recording Studios (Universal City, California); Chung King Studios (New York City); Germano Studios The Hit Factory (New York City); Larrabee Studios (Universal City); Legacy Recording Studio (New York City); Metropolis Studios (London, England); The Palms Studios (Las Vegas, Nevada); The Record Plant (Hollywood, California); Roc the Mic Studios (New York City); Serenity Sound Studios (Los Angeles, California); Studios Devout (Paris, France); TheStudio215; Triangle Sound Studios (Atlanta, Georgia); Westlake Recording Studios (Los Angeles)
- Genres: Pop; hip-hop; R&B
- Length: 51:49
- Labels: SRP; Def Jam
- Producers: Chase & Status; Terius "The-Dream" Nash; Chuck Harmony; Brian Kennedy; Stargate; C. "Tricky" Stewart; Rob Swire; will.i.am; The Y's

Rihanna chronology
Good Girl Gone Bad: The Remixes (2009)	Rated R (2009)	Rated R: Remixed (2010)

Singles from Rated R
- 1. "Russian Roulette" Released: October 26, 2009; 2. "Hard" Released: November 10, 2009; 3. "Wait Your Turn" Released: November 13, 2009; 4. "Rude Boy" Released: February 5, 2010; 5. "Rockstar 101" Released: May 18, 2010; 6. "Te Amo" Released: May 28, 2010

Rated R is the fourth studio album by Barbadian singer Rihanna. It was released on November 20, 2009, by Def Jam Recordings and SRP Records. Recording sessions for the album began in March 2009 and took place at recording studios throughout United States and Europe. Rihanna was the executive producer of the album alongside Antonio "L.A." Reid and The Carter Administration. It features additional production by various record producers, including Chase & Status, Stargate, The-Dream, Ne-Yo, and Brian Kennedy. The record features several vocalists and instrumentalists, including Young Jeezy, will.i.am, Justin Timberlake and Slash, who played the guitars in "Rockstar 101".

Musically, the album represents a departure from her previous effort Good Girl Gone Bad (2007), which contained up-tempo and ballad-oriented songs. Rated R is a rock-influenced pop, hip hop and R&B album; it features a foreboding and atmospheric tone in terms of musical and lyrical direction, and it incorporates elements of dubstep. It also explores other genres, such as dancehall in "Rude Boy" and Latin-infusion in "Te Amo". Rated R received positive reviews from music critics, who commended Rihanna's mature performance and called the album her most layered and heartfelt effort. The album debuted at number 4 on the US Billboard 200 chart and sold 181,000 copies in its first week. It also attained top ten positions in over twelve other countries.

The album produced six singles, "Russian Roulette", "Wait Your Turn", "Hard", "Rude Boy", "Rockstar 101", and "Te Amo". "Russian Roulette" was released as the album's lead single and managed to reach top-ten in over 25 countries. "Hard" became her thirteenth US top-ten single, while "Rude Boy" topped the US Billboard Hot 100 chart for five consecutive weeks. "Te Amo" attained top-ten positions around Europe and reached number 1 in Brazil. To further promote the album, Rihanna embarked on her third worldwide concert tour Last Girl on Earth (2010–2011). Rated R is deemed as an important album in Rihanna's career and a groundwork inspiration for her follow-up releases.

== Background ==
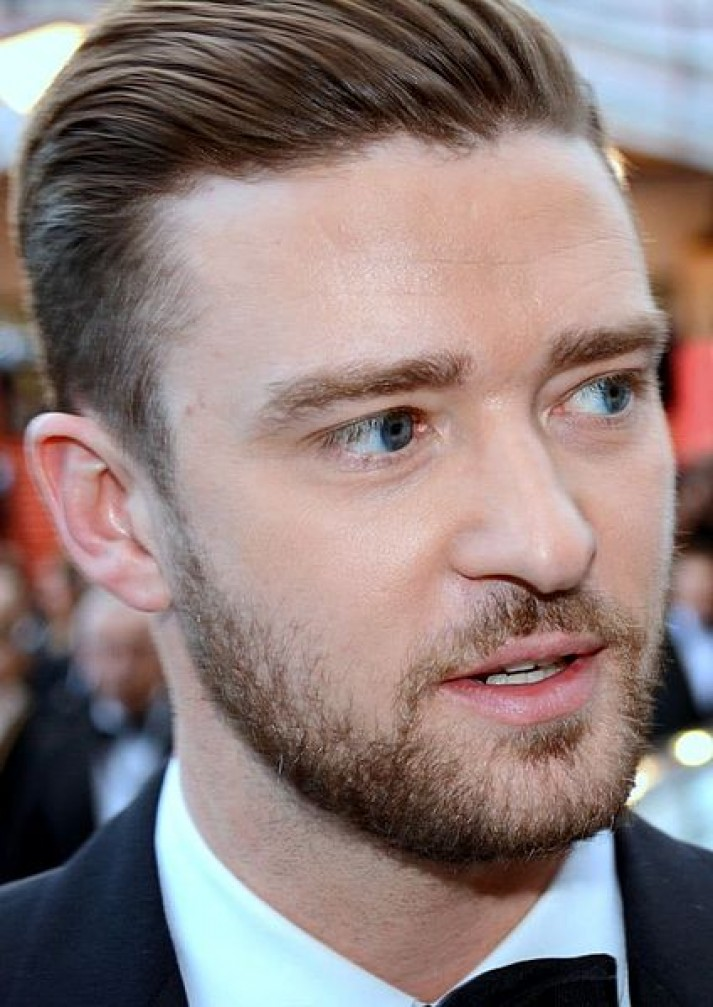
Justin Timberlake, one of the writers of the album, stated that Rated R significantly differs from Rihanna's previous album and represents a different sound for her.

Rihanna's previous album Good Girl Gone Bad (2007) was a commercial success and received generally positive reviews from most music critics. The album featured five top ten singles—three US number 1 songs—including the international breakthrough single "Umbrella". Following the assault of Rihanna's boyfriend Chris Brown on her in February 2009, there was much speculation as to whether any song featured on the upcoming album would be about him. In an interview with MTV News, regular Rihanna collaborator Ne-Yo clarified that he would not write a song for Rihanna about Brown, because he considered the idea unnecessary. Producer Chuck Harmony mused that no matter what song Rihanna released as the lead single, it would immediately be looked at as a song about Brown.

During an interview at the MTV Video Music Awards, Ne-Yo stated that listeners should expect an "edgier" and "angrier" Rihanna on the album. He later told In Touch Weekly that the album is definitely more edgy than Rihanna's prior work, describing the album as "liberated". American singer Akon, on the other hand, stated that he was "going to lighten her up" and did not want an angry Rihanna. With the success of her last album, Rihanna wanted to make sure that she did not fall into one sound or vibe. At the "Justin Timberlake & Friends Concert in Las Vegas", Timberlake told MTV News that the Rated R is a whole new sound and that the new material significantly differs from the one on her last album. "She broke onto the scene so hard with the last record — to have that many songs on the charts is impressive. I think that the smartest thing she's doing is not trying to emulate what she did but move forward", Timberlake explained.

After the release of the lead single, "Russian Roulette", Harmony was aware of the mixed reaction from fans who had heard the track. He assured fans that the song was not fully representative to the rest of the album, though it reflected Rihanna's growth as an artist. In an interview with Rap-Up, Tricky Stewart announced that he had collaborated with The-Dream on the project and said that the album is different from her past works. In February 2010, Rihanna expressed a positive opinion on the album, but commented that her future work would be less intense. She asserted, "I really like the bottom, the grime of it. But if I were to combine that with more energetic, up-tempo pop records, then I think that would be a happy marriage. And that's where we'll probably go next".

== Recording ==
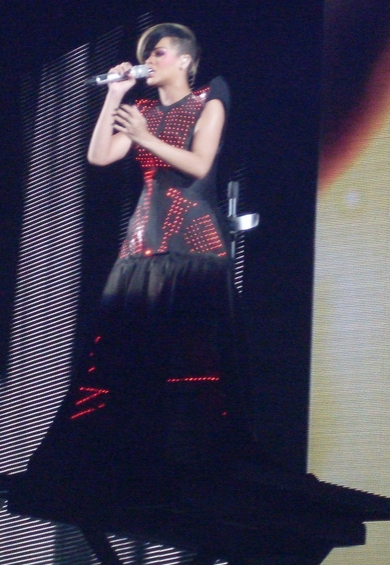
Rihanna performing "Russian Roulette", a song with dark and morbid elements

Rihanna began recording songs for the album in March 2009. The recording sessions for the album took place at Milk Studios in Manhattan, Metropolis Studios in London, Studios Davout in Paris, and at Westlake Recording Studios in Los Angeles. Rihanna worked with several different songwriters and producers on the album, including Chuck Harmony, The-Dream, Christopher "Tricky" Stewart, Chase & Status, Stargate, Demo, and Justin Timberlake. Rihanna wanted the album to be less influenced by synthpop, attempting to avoid the "lighthearted commercial pop" of her previous albums. By doing so, she incorporated a production style with more bass, and utilized Gothic imagery. In the early stages of the production, she worked with Adonis Shropshire, who stated that Rihanna had brainstormed a large number of ideas over the course of a few weeks. Rihanna also worked with Norwegian producer duo Stargate, who mused that the collaboration was "very rewarding" and "inspiring for us", commenting: "I don't think we should talk about titles just yet. We don't really know which songs are gonna make it, but it feels exciting." It was later revealed that Stargate originally produced a collaboration between Rihanna and Canadian rapper Drake, however, the song did not make the final cut for the album.

Rihanna was involved with writing most of the lyrics on the album with the help of Timberlake and Ne-Yo, who helped the singer to translate her emotions into the songs. She worked with Ne-Yo on a number of songs although he was often unclear as to which songs would actually make the album. While working together, he felt that Rihanna was not the same girl as the one he worked with a few years before, complimenting her growth musically. In terms of musical direction, Rihanna requested more somber songs for the album. Ne-Yo and Harmony co-wrote "Russian Roulette", pushing a darker and more morbid aesthetic.

After listening to the track "Saxon" performed by Nicki Minaj and production duo Chase & Status, Rihanna got in contact with the latter and wanted to collaborate. Chase & Status had a pair of sessions with Rihanna and worked together for a few weeks in an undisclosed location. The songs they worked on had a "big beats and big bass", although Rihanna had some disagreements with the duo. In October 2009, she concluded recording sessions with Tricky Stewart and The-Dream. Dream and Tricky flew out to Paris and played a few songs for Rihanna which included "Hard" and "Rockstar 101." She felt that "Hard" stood out from all the songs, due to its arrogance. In the song "Rockstar 101," guitarist Slash contributed a bass guitar on the track while "Photographs" is a duet with singer-songwriter will.i.am. In addition, Ester Dean co-wrote "Rude Boy". "The Last Song" was one of the last tracks crafted for the album. Rihanna recorded the song within the final twelve hours of the album's conception; "when the label finally said we had 12 hours to turn in the album, I was like, Okay, I have to do it. I just drank some red wine, dimmed the lights, got in the booth and sang it", she explained.

== Music and lyrics ==
"Russian Roulette"
A 22-second sample of "Russian Roulette", which features the album's bleak, gothic production style, incorporating a minor-key melody

Rated R features a darker and more foreboding tone than Rihanna's previous albums. Primarily a pop, hip hop and R&B album, it also incorporates musical elements of rock music. The album's production is typified by a sleek sound and incorporates ominous synthesizers, intertwining guitar licks, tense beats, minor-key melodies, and polyrhythmic vocal harmonies. Songs such as "G4L", "Mad House", and "Wait Your Turn" incorporate elements of dubstep, including brooding synths and grumbling basslines. The album also incorporates other musical genres, such as dancehall in the Jamaican inspired "Rude Boy" and Latin music-infusion in "Te Amo". Rihanna discussed the musical direction of the project in an interview for Glamour magazine, stating "The songs are really personal. It's rock 'n' roll, but it's really hip-hop: If Lil Wayne and Kings of Leon like my album, then I'll feel good."

The lyrical content of the album features generally bleak views on love and boastful lyrics concerning perseverance and overcoming adversity. Its lyrics are characterized by grim and angry tones, and songs that contain boastful and persevering themes are characterized by images of violence and brutality. While journalists Ann Powers of Los Angeles Times, Eric Henderson of Slant Magazine, and Rob Harvilla of The Village Voice perceived its lyrics as allusions to Rihanna's assault by Chris Brown, Jon Pareles of The New York Times wrote that the album "doesn't specifically address those events, but it hardly ignores them". According to Powers, regret is a significant theme on the album: "The songs on 'Rated R' never have their singer apologize for the man who so seriously wronged her, but they do acknowledge the other emotions that come with separation, even from a partner who's also a perpetrator. Those feelings include regret, tenderness and deep sadness".

== Artwork and fashion ==
The final image from the photoshoot for the album was made by German fashion photographer Ellen von Unwerth. Von Unwerth, who has also shot other album covers such as The Velvet Rope (1997) by Janet Jackson, Back to Basics (2006) by Christina Aguilera, and Blackout (2007) by Britney Spears, said that Rihanna was "fantastic to work with — very giving, very creative, very involved in every aspect of the shoot and ready to push the boundaries." The album cover was released on October 27, 2009, and features Rihanna in a moody, contemplative pose wearing a leather top with her hand covering her right eye and each finger wrapped in an intricate set of rings. The black-and-white cover was compared to the 1980s album covers by singer Grace Jones.

The brand and styling of Rated R was conceived by British artist and director Simon Henwood. "We spent a lot of time developing ideas, yes. We went to Paris for Fashion Week, met with designers, sat and made drawings/designs together for the photo shoot/costume pieces, etc," Henwood revealed in an interview with MuuMuse. "Everything comes from the music, and this is her most personal album to date—so everything draws from it in one way or another." For the visual creation of the era, Henwood took inspiration from the film The Omega Man and the book The Lathe of Heaven, "We wanted to create her a world that was personal... The whole thing was a dark dream; a chance for her to express all these things without being specific/literal." Henwood also conceived the look and feel of the album's artwork, videos and TV spots, and also contributed to Rihanna's Last Girl on Earth Tour, including the show's stage design, costumes, and background visuals.

== Release and promotion ==
On October 13, 2009, Rihanna released a statement along with a picture of a metal 'R' on her official website saying, "The Wait is Ova. Nov 23 09", indicating the release date for Rated R. Two days later, a countdown timer appeared on her official website and was scheduled to end on October 20, 2009. After the timer ended, "Russian Roulette" premiered on BBC Radio 1, the singer's official website and on American radio stations. On October 16, Rihanna shot a music video for "Wait Your Turn" in Washington Heights, New York City; it premiered on her official website on November 3, 2009. A snippet of the song with the title "The Wait is Ova" also appeared as background music for a promotional video of the album. On November 5, 2009, Rihanna's first televised interview since her altercation with Brown aired on Good Morning America in support of the album. In addition to appearing on Good Morning America, the interview continued the following day on ABC's 20/20.

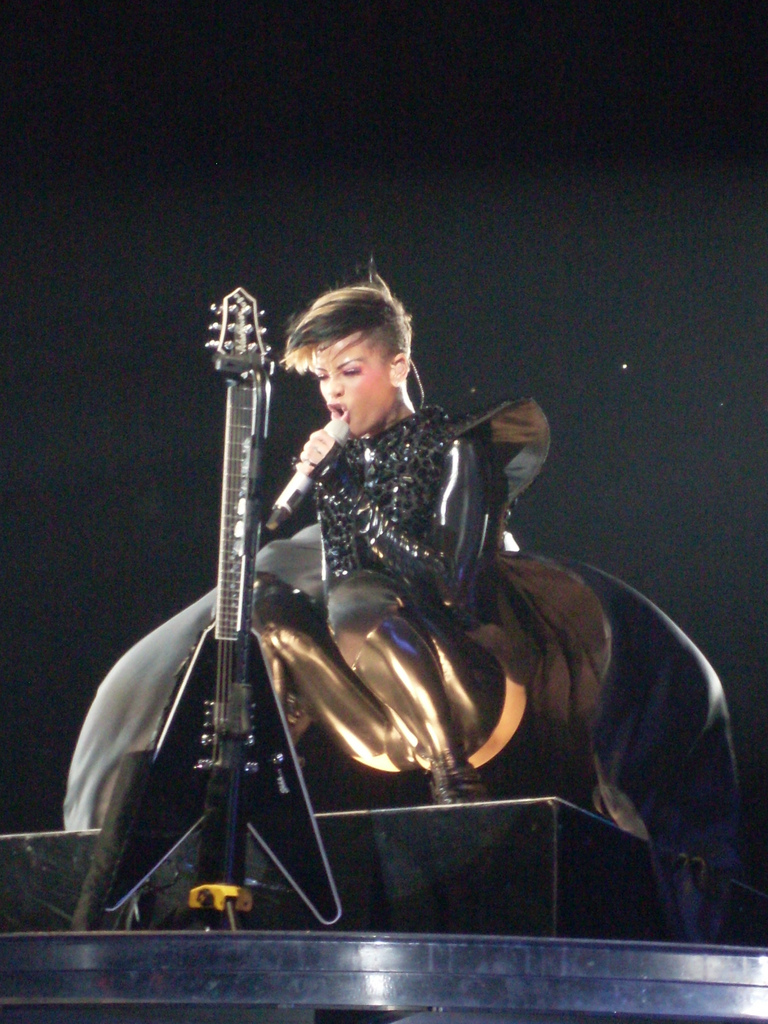
Rihanna performing "Rockstar 101" on the Last Girl on Earth tour

In November 2009, Island Def Jam convened with Nokia for a special promotional concert held on November 16, 2009, in the United Kingdom. Rihanna shot a promotional video for the event which took place at the Brixton Academy in London. She premiered songs from the album during the event which was her first solo concert since the incident with Brown. Nokia hosted listening parties around the globe on the same date of the event. The Nokia Music Store offered an enhanced version of the album on its release date, a remix and exclusive track titled "Hole in My Head" which featured Justin Timberlake. Rated R was first released on November 20, 2009, in Australia, France and Germany. Three days after, on November 23, it was launched in North America and the United Kingdom.

On February 4, 2010, Rihanna performed at the Pepsi Super Bowl Fan Jam on VH1 along with performers Timbaland and Justin Bieber. She sang a "hard-rocking version" of "Wait Your Turn", "Live Your Life", "Disturbia" and "Russian Roulette" among others. Rihanna performed a medley of "Hard", "Rude Boy" and "Don't Stop the Music" at the Nickelodeon Kids' Choice Awards on March 27, 2010. To further promote Rated R, Rihanna embarked on her third concert tour titled Last Girl on Earth Tour (2010–2011). It started on April 16, 2010, in Belgium, Europe and ended on March 12, 2011, in Australia; it also visited Asia, North America and Oceania. Ten songs from Rated R were remixed by electronic disc jockey Chew Fu and released as a remix album under the title Rated R: Remixed. The majority of the remixes were remastered to incorporate sounds from the genre of house music, and incorporate heavy usage of synthesizers as part of their instrumentation.

== Singles ==
"Russian Roulette" was sent to US radio stations on October 26, 2009, as the lead single from Rated R. The pop ballad received positive reviews from music critics, with Todd Martens of Los Angeles Times praising Rihanna's vocal performance and its lyrics. It peaked at number 9 on the US Billboard Hot 100 chart, and at number 2 on the UK Singles Chart. The music video for the song was directed by Anthony Mandler and features American actor Jesse Williams.

"Hard", which features rap vocals by Jeezy, was released as the album's second US single, being sent to radio on November 10, 2009. Leah Greenblat of Entertainment Weekly praised the singer's vocal performance and the decision to include Jeezy as a featured artist. It became Rihanna's thirteenth top ten US Billboard Hot 100 single, peaking at number 8.

"Wait Your Turn"
Alexis Petridis of The Guardian wrote that "Wait Your Turn" consists of "hypnotic, dirgey electronic grinds" and an "intoxicating mix of backwards drums, minor-key verses and spectral backing vocals."

The album's third single, "Wait Your Turn", alongside its music video, was released three days after "Hard" on November 13, 2009. Mandler shot the video, which was filmed in a black and white grainy fashion.

"Rude Boy", the album's fourth single, was released to Italian radio stations on February 5, 2010. It was received enthusiastically and was the biggest success from the album, eventually becoming Rihanna's sixth song to reach number 1 on the US Billboard Hot 100 chart. By doing so, she equaled Paula Abdul and Diana Ross as the female artists with the fifth-most number 1 singles on the Hot 100 chart in its fifty-one year history. It stayed on the summit for five consecutive weeks.

"Rockstar 101" was released as the fifth single on May 18, 2010. The song peaked at number 24 in Australia and number 64 on the US Billboard Hot 100 chart. An accompanying music video was shot in April 2010 and was directed by Melina Matsoukas.

"Te Amo" was released as the sixth and final single from Rated R; it was sent to Italian radio on May 28, 2010. It peaked within the top-ten in the Czech Republic, Hungary and Poland, and reached number 1 in Brazil. The Mandler-directed music video was shot at Castle of Vigny in Paris and featured French model Laetitia Casta as Rihanna's love interest.

== Critical reception ==
Professional ratings
Aggregate scores
Source	Rating
AnyDecentMusic?	6.1/10
Metacritic	75/100
Review scores
Source	Rating
AllMusic	4/5 stars
The A.V. Club	C+
Chicago Tribune	3.5/4 stars
The Guardian	3/5 stars
Los Angeles Times	4/4 stars
NME	7/10
Pitchfork	6.1/10
Rolling Stone	4/5 stars
Slant Magazine	4/5 stars
Spin	5/10

Rated R received positive reviews from music critics, who praised Rihanna's exploration of complex emotional themes. At Metacritic, which assigns a normalized rating out of 100 to reviews from mainstream critics, the album received an average score of 75, based on 21 reviews. It is currently her highest rated album on the site. Jody Rosen, writing for Rolling Stone, called it one of the year's best pop albums. AllMusic's Andy Kellman gave the album four out of five stars and said that Rated R is exaggerated, but "compelling" and performed convincingly by Rihanna, who sings "many memorably belligerent lines". Greg Kot of the Chicago Tribune rated it three-and-half stars out of four and called it "powerful and moving art" that Rihanna personalizes in a way that suggests she had more creative input than on her previous albums. Pareles of The New York Times, said that, although its personal subject matter is brave, it does not compromise the creativity of the music.

Powers of the Los Angeles Times gave the album four out of four star rating and called it "a complex and fascinating portrait" of an abused woman's emotional range and resolve. Alex Macpherson of Fact said that, apart from its interesting music, Rated R is important for how Rihanna has "seized back control of her public story" during "our current panoptic age". Sarah Rodman of The Boston Globe praised it as a brief look at both Rihanna's development as an artist and "the confluence of tabloid culture and pop art". For MSN Music, Robert Christgau gave the album a two-star honorable mention, indicating a "likable effort consumers attuned to its overriding aesthetic or individual vision may well enjoy." He cited "Hard" and "Rude Boy" as highlights and credited Rihanna for "concocting a persona of interest out of one dynamite musical trick" and a difficult period in her personal life.

In a mixed review, Sean Fennessey of Spin felt that the album does not suit Rihanna's ballad-based strengths and found her voice too flat and unexpressive to convey the anger of the songs. Pitchfork's Ryan Dombal similarly said that her "artistic aspirations are currently loftier than her abilities". Michaelangelo Matos of The A.V. Club rated the album C+ and viewed the music as bloated and compared its lyrics negatively to "excerpts from a therapy session". Alexis Petridis, writing in The Guardian, criticized its allusions to Brown's assault of her and said that the album does not offer anything beyond "the public's prurient interest in her private life." Harvilla of The Village Voice found the subtext uncomfortable and commented that the album's highlights, "thrilling as they are, might make you feel even worse" than the low points.

Rated R was included in three top-10 albums lists by critics for 2009. In her year-end list of best albums, Entertainment Weekly's Leah Greenblatt named it the best pop album of the year. Greg Kot of the Chicago Tribune ranked it eighth on his list of 2009's best albums. Jonah Weiner of Slate ranked Rated R number 10 on his list and hailed Rihanna as one of the women that "have a stranglehold on the pop zeitgeist."

== Commercial performance ==
Rated R debuted at number 4 on the US Billboard 200 chart, with first-week sales of 181,000 copies in the country, giving Rihanna her highest first-week sales at that time. It surpassed the first week sales of her previous album Good Girl Gone Bad, which entered at number 2 on the chart in 2007, with sales of 162,000 copies sold. It topped the US Top R&B/Hip-Hop Albums chart and became her first number 1 on the chart. On March 26, 2018, Rated R was certified two-times platinum by the Recording Industry Association of America (RIAA), and had sold over 1,130,000 copies in the US as of June 2015. The album debuted and peaked at number 5 on the Canadian Albums Chart and it received a platinum certification from Music Canada (MC).

For the issue dated November 29, 2009, the album entered at number 16 on the UK Albums Chart and was certified gold by the British Phonographic Industry (BPI) in just four days. For the issue dated March 7, 2010, the album broke into the top ten, and reached its number 9 peak in the 15th week on the chart. It had sold over 710,000 copies in the country, as of 2015, and earned a two-times platinum certification from BPI. The album debuted at number 15 on the Australian Albums Chart. In August, the album was certified platinum for shipping 70,000 units. For the issue dated March 14, 2010, Rated R set a new high of 12. It entered and peaked at number 14 on the New Zealand Albums Chart.

Rated R debuted at number 12 on the Norwegian Albums Chart. In its tenth week, it peaked atop the chart and became Rihanna's first number 1 album in the country. It was certified gold by IFPI Norway, denoting sales of over 15,000 copies. The album opened at number 1 on the Swiss Albums Chart for the issue dated December 6, 2009, and spent a total of forty-three weeks on the chart. It received a platinum certification from IFPI Switzerland for shipment of 15,000 copies in the country. Rated R debuted and peaked at number 4 on the German Albums Chart for the issue dated December 4, 2009. It became Rihanna's second top-five album and received a platinum certification from Bundesverband Musikindustrie (BVMI) for shipments of over 200,000 copies in the country. In Poland, the album peaked at number 5 and received a gold certification, selling 20,000 copies in one month, beating Good Girl Gone Bad's sales of 20,000 achieved in two years. It also peaked at number 7 at the Austrian and Irish Albums charts, and number 10 on the Croatian, French and Japanese Albums charts. Worldwide, Rated R had sold over three million copies, as of November 2010.

== Legacy ==
Rated R is deemed a pivotal record in Rihanna's career as it was released nine months after the domestic violence case with Chris Brown. In 2019, ten years after the album release, Chuck Arnold of Billboard described the record as a "coming-of-age manifesto" and also Rihanna's version of Jackson's Control (1986). According to him, Rated R is "her declaration of independence from Chris Brown and her taking charge of a narrative that had turned her into a victim." Similarly, Blavity's Jordan Simon compared it to Jackson's The Velvet Rope, and described it as "a dark portrait of a Black woman's journey to self-healing".

== Track listing ==
Rated R track listing
No.	Title	Writer(s)	Producer(s)	Length
1.	"Mad House"	Makeba Riddick; Will Kennard; Saul Milton; Robyn Fenty	Chase & Status; Riddick^{[a]}	1:34
2.	"Wait Your Turn"	James Fauntleroy II; Mikkel S. Eriksen; Tor Erik Hermansen; Kennard; Milton; Takura Tendayi; Fenty	Stargate; Chase & Status; Eriksen^{[a]}	3:46
3.	"Hard" (featuring Jeezy)	Terius "The-Dream" Nash; C. "Tricky" Stewart; Fenty; Jay Jenkins	Stewart; Nash; Riddick^{[a]}	4:10
4.	"Stupid in Love"	Shaffer Smith; Eriksen; Hermansen	Stargate; Ne-Yo^{[b]}; Riddick^{[a]}	4:01
5.	"Rockstar 101" (featuring Slash)	Nash; Stewart; Fenty	Stewart; Nash; Riddick^{[a]}	3:58
6.	"Russian Roulette"	Smith; Charles Harmon	Chuck Harmony; Ne-Yo^{[b]}; Riddick^{[a]}	3:47
7.	"Fire Bomb"	Fauntleroy II; Brian Kennedy; Fenty	Kennedy; Riddick^{[a]}	4:17
8.	"Rude Boy"	Eriksen; Hermansen; Ester Dean; Riddick; Rob Swire; Fenty	Stargate; Swire; Riddick^{[a]}	3:43
9.	"Photographs" (featuring will.i.am)	William Adams; Jean Baptiste; Michael McHenry; Allan Pineda	will.i.am; Paper-Boy^{[c]}	4:46
10.	"G4L"	Kennard; Milton; Fauntleroy II; Fenty	Chase & Status; Riddick^{[a]}	3:59
11.	"Te Amo"	Eriksen; Hermansen; Fauntleroy II; Fenty	Stargate; Riddick^{[a]}	3:28
12.	"Cold Case Love"	Justin Timberlake; Robin Tadross; Fauntleroy II	The Y's; Riddick^{[a]}	6:04
13.	"The Last Song"	Fauntleroy II; Kennedy; Ben Harrison; Fenty	Kennedy; Harrison^{[c]}; Riddick^{[a]}	4:16
Total length:				51:49

Nokia bonus tracks
No.	Title	Writer(s)	Producer(s)	Length
14.	"Russian Roulette" (Donni Hotwheel Remix)			3:01
15.	"Hole in My Head"	Timberlake; Tadross; Fauntleroy II	The Y's; Riddick^{[a]}	4:05
Total length:				58:55

=== Notes ===
- ^{^[a]} signifies a vocal producer
- ^{^[b]} signifies a co-producer
- ^{^[c]} signifies an additional producer

== Personnel ==
Credits for Rated R adapted from AllMusic and album's liner notes.

Recording and mixing locations

- The Boom Boom Room, Burbank (tracks 3, 5)
- Chalice Recording Studios, Universal City (tracks 2, 6)
- Chung King Studios, New York City (tracks 4, 8, 10, 11)
- Germano Studios, New York City (tracks 7, 10, 12, 13)
- Larrabee Studios, Universal City (track 3)
- Legacy Recording Studio, New York City (tracks 1, 3)
- Metropolis Studios, London (tracks 2, 4, 7, 8, 10, 11, 13)
- The Palms Studios, Las Vegas (track 12)
- The Record Plant, Hollywood (tracks 7, 13)
- Roc the Mic Studios, New York City (tracks 6, 12, 13)
- Serenity Sound Studios, Los Angeles (tracks 5, 7)
- Studios Davour, Paris (track 3)
- TheStudio215 (track 12)
- Triangle Sound Studios, Atlanta (tracks 3, 5)
- Westlake Studios, Los Angeles (tracks 7, 12)

Musicians and technical

- Mykael Alexander – assistant engineer (tracks 1, 6, 13)
- Davis Barnett – viola (track 12)
- Beardyman – additional vocals (track 1)
- Jessie Bonds – guitar (track 6)
- Jay Brown – A&R
- Bobby Campbell – assistant (track 12)
- Chase – producer (tracks 1, 2, 10), instrumentation (track 2)
- James J. Cooper III – cello and cello soloist (track 12)
- Cédric Culnaërt – assistant engineer (track 3)
- Kevin "KD" Davis – mixing (tracks 1, 2, 4, 6–8, 10, 11, 13)
- Steven Dennis – assistant engineer (tracks 3, 5)
- Dylan Dresdow – mixing (track 9)
- Mikkel S. Eriksen – producer and instrumentation (tracks 2, 4, 8, 11), engineer and vocal producer (tracks 2, 11)
- James Fauntleroy – producer (track 12), backing vocals (track 13)
- Glenn Fischbach – cello (track 12)
- Paul Foley – engineer and mixing assistant (track 12)
- Rick Friedrich – assistant strings engineer (track 12)
- Future Cut – additional keyboards (track 1)
- Rathablos Fvanz – art direction, design
- Chris Gehringer — mastering
- Mariel Haenn – stylist
- Alex Haldi – design
- Kevin Hanson – assistant engineer (track 6)
- Chuck Harmony – producer (track 6)
- Keith Harris – strings (track 9)
- Ben Harrison – guitar and additional production (track 13)
- Karl Heilbron – vocal engineer for Jeezy (track 3)
- Simon Henwood – art direction, design, photography, stylist
- Tor Erik Hermansen – producer and instrumentation (tracks 2, 4, 8, 11)
- Jean-Marie Horvat – mixing (track 12)
- Ghazi Hourani – mixing assistant (tracks 7, 13)
- Jeezy — rap (track 3)
- Mike "TrakGuru" Johnson – engineer (track 6)
- Jaycen Joshua – mixing (tracks 3, 5)
- Brian Kennedy – producer and keyboards (tracks 7, 13), additional programming (track 10)
- Padraic "Padlock" Kerin – engineer (track 9)
- Rob Knox — producer (track 12)
- Olga Konopelsky – violin (track 12)
- Emma Kummrow – violin (track 12)
- Giancarlo Lino – mixing assistant (tracks 3, 5)
- Pater Martinez – assistant engineer (track 12)
- Luigi Mazzocchi – violin and violin soloist (track 12)
- Terius "The-Dream" Nash – producer (tracks 3, 5)
- Luis Navarro – assistant engineer (tracks 3, 5)
- Ne-Yo – co-producer (tracks 4, 6)
- Monte Neuble – additional keyboards (tracks 3, 5)
- Jared Newcomb – mixing assistant (tracks 2, 6)
- Peter Nocella – viola (track 12)
- Chris "Tek" O'Ryan – engineer (tracks 3, 5)
- Anthony Palazzole – mixing assistant (tracks 1, 4, 8, 10, 11)
- Paper-Boy – additional production (track 9)
- Ciarra Pardo – art direction, design
- Charles Parker – violin (track 12)
- Ross 'Dights' Parkin – assistant engineer (tracks 4, 7, 8, 10, 11)
- Daniel Parry – assistant engineer (track 2)
- Kevin Porter – assistant engineer (tracks 7, 10, 12, 13)
- Antonio Reid – executive producer
- Antonio Resendiz – assistant engineer (track 12)
- Makeba Riddick – vocal producer (tracks 1, 4–6, 8, 12, 13), backing vocals (track 1)
- Rihanna – vocals, executive producer, art direction, design
- Montez Roberts – assistant strings engineer (track 12)
- JP Robinson – art direction, design, photography
- Evan Rogers – co-executive producer
- Sébastien Salis – assistant engineer (track 3)
- Jason Sherwood – assistant engineer (tracks 3, 5)
- Slash – guitar (track 5)
- Tyran "Ty Ty" Smith – A&R
- Caleb Speir – bass (track 9)
- Status – producer (tracks 1, 2, 10), instrumentation (track 2)
- Xavier Stephenson – assistant engineer (track 2)
- Christopher "Tricky" Stewart – producer (tracks 3, 5)
- Tim Stewart – guitar (track 5)
- Bernt Rune Stray – guitar (track 11)
- Carl Sturken – co-executive producer
- Rob Swire – producer (track 8)
- Igor Szwec – violin (track 12)
- Sean Tallman – engineer (track 7)
- Gregory Teperman – violin (track 12)
- Brian "B-Luv" Thomas – engineer (tracks 3, 5)
- Justin Timberlake — producer (track 12)
- Pat Thrall – additional engineering (tracks 3, 5)
- Marcos Tovar – engineer (all tracks)
- Neil Tucker – assistant engineer (track 11), guitar engineer (track 13)
- Tyler Van Dalen – assistant engineer (track 3)
- Ellen von Unwerth – photography
- Alain Whyte – acoustic guitar (track 9)
- will.i.am – producer, engineer, vocals, and drum programming (track 9)
- Andrew Wuepper – engineer (tracks 3, 5)

== Charts ==
=== Weekly charts ===
Weekly chart performance for Rated R
Chart (2009−2010)	Peak position
Australian Albums (ARIA)	12
Austrian Albums (Ö3 Austria)	7
Belgian Albums (Ultratop Flanders)	16
Belgian Albums (Ultratop Wallonia)	16
Canadian Albums (Billboard)	5
Croatian International Albums (HDU)	10
Czech Albums (IFPI)	15
Danish Albums (Hitlisten)	32
Dutch Albums (Album Top 100)	18
European Albums (Billboard)	5
Finnish Albums (Suomen virallinen lista)	14
French Albums (SNEP)	10
German Albums (Offizielle Top 100)	4
Hungarian Albums (MAHASZ)	31
Irish Albums (IRMA)	7
Italian Albums (FIMI)	33
Japanese Albums (Oricon)	10
Mexican Albums (Top 100 Mexico)	51
New Zealand Albums (RMNZ)	14
Norwegian Albums (VG-lista)	1
Polish Albums (OLiS)	5
Russian Albums (2M)	9
Scottish Albums (Official Charts)	13
Spanish Albums (Promusicae)	23
Swedish Albums (Sverigetopplistan)	19
Swiss Albums (Schweizer Hitparade)	1
Taiwan International Albums (G-Music)	7
UK Albums (Official Charts)	9
UK R&B Albums (Official Charts)	2
US Billboard 200	4
US Top R&B/Hip-Hop Albums (Billboard)	1

=== Year-end charts ===
2009 year-end chart performance for Rated R
Chart (2009)	Position
Australian Albums (ARIA)	97
French Albums (SNEP)	82
Polish Albums (ZPAV)	52
Swiss Albums (Schweizer Hitparade)	80
UK Albums (Official Charts)	58

2010 year-end chart performance for Rated R
Chart (2010)	Position
Australian Albums (ARIA)	52
Austrian Albums (Ö3 Austria)	67
Belgian Albums (Ultratop Flanders)	55
Belgian Albums (Ultratop Wallonia)	63
Canadian Albums (Billboard)	28
Croatian International Albums (HDU)	13
Dutch Albums (Album Top 100)	69
European Top 100 Albums (Billboard)	13
French Albums (SNEP)	49
German Albums (Offizielle Top 100)	59
Russian Albums (2M)	79
Swiss Albums (Schweizer Hitparade)	12
UK Albums (Official Charts)	28
US Billboard 200	21
US Digital Albums (Billboard)	25
US Top R&B/Hip-Hop Albums (Billboard)	7

== Certifications ==
Certifications and sales for Rated R
Region	Certification	Certified units/sales
Australia (ARIA)	Platinum	70,000^{^}
Belgium (BRMA)	Gold	15,000^{*}
Canada (Music Canada)	Platinum	80,000^{^}
France (SNEP)	Platinum	100,000^{*}
Germany (BVMI)	Platinum	200,000^{‡}
Ireland (IRMA)	Platinum	15,000^{^}
Italy (FIMI)	Gold	30,000^{*}
New Zealand (RMNZ)	Platinum	15,000^{‡}
Norway (IFPI Norway)	Gold	15,000^{*}
Poland (ZPAV)	Gold	10,000^{*}
Singapore (RIAS)	Gold	5,000^{*}
Switzerland (IFPI Switzerland)	Platinum	30,000^{^}
United Kingdom (BPI)	2× Platinum	710,000
United States (RIAA)	2× Platinum	2,000,000^{‡}
Summaries
Worldwide	—	3,000,000
^{*} Sales figures based on certification alone.^{^} Shipments figures based on certification alone.^{‡} Sales+streaming figures based on certification alone.

== Release history ==
Release formats for Rated R
Region	Date	Format(s)	Label	Ref.
Australia	November 20, 2009	CD; digital download	Def Jam; SRP	
France	November 20, 2009	CD; digital download	Def Jam; SRP	
Germany	November 20, 2009	CD; digital download	Def Jam; SRP	
Canada	November 23, 2009	CD; digital download	Def Jam; SRP	
United Kingdom	November 23, 2009	CD; digital download	Def Jam; SRP	
United States	November 23, 2009	CD; digital download	Def Jam; SRP	
Spain	November 24, 2009	CD; digital download	Def Jam; SRP	
Japan	November 25, 2009	CD	Def Jam; SRP	
Japan	August 1, 2012	SHM-CD	Def Jam; SRP	
Canada	April 7, 2017	Vinyl	Def Jam; SRP	
France	April 7, 2017	Vinyl	Def Jam; SRP	
Germany	April 7, 2017	Vinyl	Def Jam; SRP	
Spain	April 7, 2017	Vinyl	Def Jam; SRP	
United Kingdom	April 7, 2017	Vinyl	Def Jam; SRP	
United States	April 7, 2017	Vinyl	Def Jam; SRP	

== See also ==
- List of number-one albums in Norway (2010)
- List of Billboard number-one R&B albums of 2009
