= Chew Fu =

- Also known as: Chew Fu Phat, Chew Fu, DJ Mac Attack, Pay Tur P.K., Phantom 309
- Born: Peter Jack Kardolus; 1973 (age 52–53); Netherlands
- Origin: Amsterdam, Netherlands
- Genres: Electronic, electro house, hip hop
- Occupations: Record producer, Musician, DJ
- Instruments: Mixer, saxophone
- Years active: 1999–Present
- Website: www.chewfumusic.com

Chew Fu is a New York-based electronic record producer, remixer and DJ, born in the Netherlands.

He is best known for his official remixes for pop artists including Lady Gaga, Rihanna, Timbaland, Mariah Carey, Far East Movement and Robyn and his distinctive style of production which features a fusion of electro house and hip hop music.

Instead of using the term remix, Chew Fu coined the term "refix" because he says that his "remixes are like a completely new productions." When DJing Chew Fu only plays his own original productions and remixes.

On where his name came from, "My crew came up with it when I was producing tracks for Bad Boy Records to describe my production process and style. Chew Fu is the sound made during and after I’ve consumed a track and spit out a hot refix."

== Early life ==
Kardolus grew up in Almere, Netherlands. He graduated with honors from the saxophone at the Utrecht Conservatory with Piet Noordijk. He is a classically trained jazz musician who holds a master's degree in Music.

== Career ==
In the 1990s, he performed with Eboman and he played in Sound of Impact and worked in the 1990s as DJ Mac Attack and made two EPs under that name. He played in The Mindminders He then played with the band include at Lowlands, Pinkpop, Dynamo Open Air and the Drum Rhythm Festival. Published in 2000 album Breathe of Life by Ellen Helmus was produced by Kardolus and then he played saxophone and keyboards. With Helmus and The Mindminders he played in 2001 at the North Sea Jazz Festival.

He moved to Brooklyn in 2001 to get a start in music. He spread his music for free on weblogs. Chew Fu got his start in the industry working for Diddy and Quincy Jones's record label Qwest. as well as utilizing a worldwide network of dance music bloggers.

Chew Fu began "producing hip hop with house music back in 2005, because he wanted to play it in the clubs but no-one was making it." He switched to house music until it caught on in 2010 when he began to produce remixes for Lady Gaga, Timbaland, and Rihanna.

As a producer, Chew Fu has created original productions with Wiley, Beanie Man, Donna Summer, Kerli and Doug E Fresh, to be included on his debut album slated for release in July 2011.

In 2012 he produced original songs for Breedlove, Perry Mystique, Steve Clisby, A-Clay, and J-cast.

== Discography ==
=== Albums ===
- Rated R: Remixed (2010)
- Chew Fu and... [Volume 1] (2011)
- Chew Hefner Affair (2011)
- Magic Monday (2015)

=== Extended plays ===
- Get it On (2000)
- Music Makes Me (2001)
- The Rhythm in You/Suntan Lotion (2001)
- Without You (2002)
- Rise Up (2003)
- U Can Make it (2003)
- Why Can`t we Change (2005)

*Stand By Me (2006)

- Move for Me (2007)
- At The Club (2008)
- Shake Your Thang (2008)
- Take That (2010)
- The Magic Monday (2014)
- Purple Rain (2015)

=== Singles ===
- "Without You" (2002)
- "Stand By Me" (2006)
- "Shake Your Thang" (2008)
- "Lovegame (Chew Fu Ghettohouse fix)" (2009)
- "Take That" (2010)
- "I Never Had" (2011)
- "Sex O'Clock" (2015)

=== Remixes ===
Title	Artist
Don't Trust Me (Chew Fu Festival FixXx)	3OH!3 & Kid Kudi
Oytta Control (Chew Fu Fix)	50 Cent & Sean Paul
Ayo Technology (Chew Fu Fix)	50-Cent, Justin Timberlake, & Timbaland
New York State of Grind (Chew Fu Fix)	A-Clay & J-Cast
Release Me (Chew Fu Fix)	Agnes
Try Sleeping with a Broken Heart (Chew Fu Insomniac)	Alicia Keys
Hole in my Heart (Chew Fu Fix)	Alphabeat
Shame on Me (Chew Fu Festival FixX)	Amanda Blank
When You Look Me In The Eyes (Chew Fu Eyes Wide Shut Fix)	Amanda Encore
An Open Letter to NYC (Chew Fu TEK Refix)	Beastie Boys
Boom Boom Pow (Chew Fu GhettoHouse Fix)	Black Eyed Peas
Meet Me Halfway (Chew Fu GhettoHouse Fix)	Black Eyed Peas
Heartbreak On Vinyl (Chew Fu 12-Inch Fix)	Blake Lewis
Crossfire (Chew Fu Friendly Fire Fix)	Brandon Flowers
If U Seek Amy (Chew Fu GhettoHouse Refix)	Britney Spears
Hurt (Chew Fu GhettoHouse fix)	Busta Rhymes & T.I.
We Made It (Chew Fu Big Room Fix)	Busta Rhymes & Linkin Park
Quem Nasceu Piriga (Chew Fu Remix)	Camilla Uckers
We Be Playaz (Chew Fu Big Room Fix)	Chamillionaire, 24 Skorpionz & J-Cast
Do Drugs	Chew Fu & The Beat Kids
Wicked Game (Chew Fu Fix) (feat. J-Cast & Lee Majors)	Chris Isaak
Love Sex Magic (Chew Fu Small Room Fix)	Ciara feat. Justin Timberlake
Knippelsuppe (Chew Fu & Jackson on Acciiiid Fix)	Coppyfokkng
Sunglasses at Night (Chew Fu Fix) (feat. J-Cast & A-Clay)	Corey Hart
It's That Funky (Chew Fu Fix)	Crazy Cousinz
Make Love (Chew Fu & Substantial Small Room Sax Fix)	Daft Punk
Chica Bomb (Chew Fu Hurt Locker FixXx)	Dan Balan
Enjoy the Silence (Chew Fu Fix)	Depeche Mode
Last Night (Chew Fu Fix)	Diddy & Keyshia Cole
Hello Good Morning (Chew Fu Rise and Shine Fix)	Diddy-Dirty Money
Fascinated (Chew Fu Big Room 90`S Fix)	DJ Dan
Saturday Love (Chew Fu Fix)	Doobie Brothers & Alexander O’Neal
Do It Like This(Original) /Brooklyn Zoo	Doug E Fresh & Chew Fu
She Likes To (Chew Fu Fix)	England 10
Love Dealer (Chew Fu Let’s Make a Deal Fix)	Esmée Denters
Sweet Dreams (Chew Fu Fix) (feat. Substantial & J-Cast)	Eurythmics
Samolti (Chew Fu Fix)	Faggot Fairys
New York, New York (Chew Fu Big Room Fix)	Frank Sinatra
Let It Go (Chew Fu Fix)	Frankie Finch & CHEW FU
Chicks & Pills (Chew Fu Fix)	Frankie Finch & CHEW FU
Let It Go (Chew Fu Ohmidbod Fix)	Frankie Finch
Sexy Ass Biach (Chew Fu Small Room Fix)	Frankie Finch
Such a Problem (Chew Fu Runway Fix)	Frankie Finch
Pop Goes The World (Chew Fu 8 million Ways to Pop Fix)	Gossip
Pop Goes The World (Chew Fu Crazy Glu Fix)	Gossip
I Can Feel It	Greg Nice & Chew Fu
Keep Up (Chew Fu Cold Crush Fix)	Hypercrush
Keep Up (Chew Fu Orange Crush Fix)	Hypercrush
Self Machine (Chew Fu Robotix Fix)	I Blame Coco
Sunrise (Chew Fu Wasabi Fix)	Irene Nelson
I Want You Back (Chew Fu Big Room Fix)	Jackson 5
In My Head (Chew Fu He-Mann Fix)	Jason Derulo
Encore (Chew Fu Fix)	Jay-Z & Linkin Park
Dirt off Your Shoulder (Chew Fu Fix)	Jay-Z
Need U Bad (Chew Fu Fix)	Jazmine Sullivan
Bakerstreet (Chew Fu Barfight Fix)	J-Cast & Chew Fu
In Love With Yo Booty (Chew Fu Booty Call Fix)	John Blu
Love Lockdown (Chew Fu Small Room fix)	Kanye West
Tea Party (Chew Fu Decaffeinated Fix)	Kerli
Use Somebody (Chew Fu Festival Fix)	Kings of Leon
Alejandro (Chew Fu Haus FixX)	Lady Gaga
Bad Romance (Chew Fu H1N1 Fix)	Lady Gaga
Bad Romance (Chew Fu H1N1 Radio Edit)	Lady Gaga
Born This Way (Chew Fu Born to Fix Remix)	Lady Gaga
LoveGame (Chew Fu GhettoHouse Fix) (feat. Marilyn Manson)	Lady Gaga
Paparazzi (Chew Fu GhettoHouse Fix)	Lady Gaga
Paparazzi (Chew Fu GhettoHouse Radio Edit)	Lady Gaga
Monster (Chew Fu "Paws Up" Fix)	Lady Gaga
Telephone (Chew Fu Playmale Fix)	Lady Gaga
The Edge of Glory (Chew Fu Glorifield Fix) (feat. A-Clay)	Lady Gaga
She Ain't Got Shit On Me (Chew Fu Fix)	LeToya
Test (Chew Fu He-Mann Fix)	Mann Feat. Jason Derulo
H.A.T.E.U. (Chew Fu "Stop Hating" Fix)	Mariah Carey
I Want to Know What Love Is (Chew Fu Extended Club Fix)	Mariah Carey
Devour (Chew Fu Ghettohouse FixXx)	Marilyn Manson
Trainers (Chew Fu Sneaka Fix)	Marvell
I Can't Hide (Chew Fu Hide & Seek Fix)	Mary J. Blige
Dead End (Chew Fu Fix)	Master Shortie
Rope Chain (Chew Fu Refix)	Master Shortie
Work (Chew Fu TEK Fix)	Masters at work
Lick Shots (Chew Fu H=H Fix)	Missy Elliott
Oui Mais... Non (Mais Non...) (Chew Fu Refix)	Mylène Farmer
Candyman (Chew Fu GhettoHouse Fix)	Nevins feat. Greg Nice
Love of an Orchestra (Chew Fu Killer Whale Fix)	Noah & The Whale
The Turning (Chew Fu Festival Fix)	Oasis
Daydream Believer (Chew Fu Fix)	Olivia Newton-John
Devil Gate Drive (Chew Fu & PVH Night Fever Remix)	Olivia Newton-John
I Think I Love You (Chew Fu & PVH Love Hurts Remix)	Olivia Newton-John
Mickey (Chew Fu Fix)	Olivia Newton-John
Sugar, Sugar (Chew Fu Fix)	Olivia Newton-John
Diddy Bop (Chew Fu GhettoHouse Fix)	P.Diddy
Unpredictable	Paradiso Girls
Whose My Bitch (Chew Fu Bitch Slap Fix)	Paradiso Girls
Whose My Bitch (Chew Fu DVW Fix)	Paradiso Girls
Blow Me (One Last Kiss) (Chew Fu Pretty In P!nk Extended Fix)	Pink
I'm The Man in My City (Chew Fu Fix)	Popov & Chew Fu
Say a Command (Chew Fu Fix)	Pretty Ricky
Purple Rain (Cover feat. Steve Clisby)	Prince
Nothing 2 Lose (Chew Fu Unlimited Fix)	Ray & Anita
Fire Bomb (Chew Fu Molotov Fix)	Rihanna
G4L (Chew Fu Guns In The Air Fix)	Rihanna
Madhouse (Chew Fu Straight Jacket Fix)	Rihanna
Rockstar 101 (Chew Fu Teachers Pet FixXx)	Rihanna
Rude Boy (Chew Fu Bumbaclot Fix)	Rihanna
Russian Roulette (Chew Fu Black Russian Fix)	Rihanna
Stupid in Love (Chew Fu Small Room Fix)	Rihanna
Wait Your Turn (Chew Fu Can't Wait No More Fix)	Rihanna
Photographs (Chew Fu 35mm FixX)	Rihanna feat. will.i.am
Hard (Chew Fu Granite Fix)	Rihanna feat. Jezzy
Pour It Up (Chew Fu Fix)	Rihanna
Dancing on My Own (Chew Fu Dancing With Myself Fix)	Robyn
Raise Your Hands	Rogue Traders
Fly Away (Chew Fu We Fly High Fix)	Saga Bloom
Something Like a Party	School Gyrls
Slow Down (Chew Fu Refix)	Selena Gomez
Licky (Chew Fu Fix)	Shontelle
Cool (Chew Fu Fix)	Snoop Dogg
Life Goes On... (Chew Fu Afterlife Fix)	Solomon
Black Hole Sun (Chew Fu Big Room Fix)	Soundgarden
Supa Lova (Chew Fu Love to Love You Fix)	Starshell
Born to Be Wild (Chew Fu Fix) (feat. A-Clay & Lee Majors)	Steppenwolf
Stand By Me	Steve Clisby & Chew Fu
Between the Lines (Chew Fu White Lines Fix)	Stone Temple Pilots
Between the Lines (Chew Fu YaYo Fix)	Stone Temple Pilots
Sweet Dreams (Remix)/Youngsta	Substantial, J-Cast & Chew Fu
Romantik (Chew Fu "Hopelessly Romantik" Fix)	Teoman
People are Strange(Chew Fu D&G fix)	The Doors
Love Like Woe (Chew Fu Ready-Set-Go Fix)	The Ready Set
Get Out of My House (Chew Fu H=H Fix)	The Streets
We Got You (Chew Fu Refix)	The Score
Carry Out (Chew Fu "No MSG" Fix)	Timbaland feat. Justin Timberlake
Carry Out (Chew Fu Fix)	Timbaland feat. Justin Timberlake
If We Ever Meet Again (Chew Fu Fix)	Timbaland feat. Katy Perry
Morning After Dark (Chew Fu 2016 B-Boy Fix)	Timbaland feat. Soshy
OMG Chew Fu (Chew Fu WTF Ghettohouse Fix)	Usher feat. will.i.am
OMG (Chew Fu BTW Fix)	Usher
OMG (Chew Fu SOS Fix)	Usher
OMG (Chew Fu WTF Fix)	Usher
Take That	Wiley & Chew Fu
Cash In My Pocket (Chew Fu Small Room Fix)	Wiley
Dirty Talk (Chew Fu Phone Sex Fix)	Wynter Gordon
We No Speak Americano (Chew Fu Rosetta Stone Fix)	Yolanda Be Cool & DCUP
French Kiss	Ysa Ferrer
Eternity (Chew Fu NYC Mix)	yuri & Chew Fu feat. Tomiko Van
