= Te Amo (Rihanna song) =

2010 single by Rihanna

Single by Rihanna

from the album Rated R
- Released: May 28, 2010
- Recorded: 2009
- Studio: Metropolis (London, England)
- Genre: Latin pop; R&B
- Length: 3:28
- Label: Def Jam; SRP
- Songwriters: Mikkel S. Eriksen; Tor Erik Hermansen; James Fauntleroy II; Robyn Fenty
- Producer: Stargate

Rihanna singles chronology
"Rockstar 101" (2010)	"Te Amo" (2010)	"Love the Way You Lie" (2010)

Music video
- "Te Amo" on YouTube

"Te Amo" (English: "I Love You") is a song by Barbadian singer Rihanna from her fourth studio album, Rated R (2009). The song was written by Rihanna, Mikkel S. Eriksen, Tor Erik Hermansen, James Fauntleroy II, with production helmed by Eriksen and Hermansen under their production name Stargate. "Te Amo" impacted radio in Italy on May 28, 2010, and was released via digital download on June 8, 2010, in Australia, Italy and New Zealand, as the album's sixth and final single. "Te Amo" incorporates elements of music of Latin America and conveys Rihanna's struggles as the object of another woman's desires.

Music critics praised the song for its lyrics and for a less futuristic sound than other songs on Rated R. "Te Amo" peaked inside the top ten of particularly European national charts, including the Czech Republic, Hungary, and Poland. The song also attained top forty positions in Australia, The Netherlands and Slovakia. "Te Amo" was certified gold in four countries and platinum in the United Kingdom and double platinum in Brazil. The song's accompanying music video was directed by longtime collaborator Anthony Mandler and features French supermodel Laetitia Casta, who tries to seduce Rihanna and eventually succeeds. Rihanna performed the song live at BBC Radio 1's Big Weekend on May 23, 2010 in Bangor, Wales. "Te Amo" was also included on the set list of Rihanna's Last Girl on Earth tour.

== Background and composition ==
"Te Amo"
A 20-second sample of Rihanna singing the chorus of "Te Amo", which music critics praised for not sounding as "futuristic" or "electronic" as other songs on Rated R, such as "Hard" and "G4L".

"Te Amo" was released as the fourth international and fifth overall single from Rihanna's fourth studio album, Rated R. The song was written by Mikkel S. Eriksen, Tor Erik Hermansen, James Fauntleroy II and Rihanna, with production helmed by Eriksen and Hermansen under their production name, Stargate. The song was sent to Italian radio on May 28, 2010, and released via digital download in Australia, Italy and New Zealand on June 8, 2010. In Germany, "Te Amo" was released as a CD single on June 11, 2010.

Musically, the song is written in the key of G-sharp minor with Rihanna's vocal range spanning from the low note of B♯_{2} to the high note of C♯_{5}. Lyrically, "Te Amo" tells of a relationship between two women, with one realizing that she is falling in love with Rihanna, proclaiming "Te amo" throughout the song (the Spanish and Portuguese phrase for "I Love You"). As Rihanna realizes that the other woman is falling in love with her, Rihanna sings, "I feel the love, but I don't feel that way", meaning that she knows her suitor loves her, but does not want to become romantically involved with her.

== Critical reception ==
As part of his review for Rated R, Jude Rogers of BBC Music noted that "Te Amo" and "Rockstar 101" were the less futuristic tracks on the album as they do not feature the heavy electronic influences, which are present on songs such as "Hard" and "G4L". Robert Copsey of Digital Spy awarded the song a rating of four out of five stars and noted that Rihanna had progressed from singing about a male interest in one of her previous singles, "Rude Boy", to fantasizing about women, writing "After the rather explicit 'Rude Boy' campaign, Rihanna's taking a well-deserved break from titillating the blokes here – only to find herself the object of another lady's affections. One of her Rated R LPs less menacing moments, 'Te Amo' finds La Fenty grappling with her sexuality over some irresistible, Latin-infused Stargate beats." Fraser McAlpine of BBC Music awarded the song four out of five stars and commented on the theme of lesbianism, writing "It's that old, old story: Girl meets girl. Girl speaks different language to girl. Girl loves girl. Girl doesn't love girl. Girl sad. We’ve all been there, right? And Rihanna’s captured that feeling beautifully."

== Chart performance ==
Upon the release of the album, "Te Amo" made its first chart appearance on the Swedish Singles Chart, where it debuted at number 52 on December 4, 2009, and initially charted for a single week. After being released as a promotional CD in Sweden on May 5, 2010, the song re-entered the chart at number 53 on July 7, 2010. "Te Amo" peaked at number 48 two weeks later on July 30, and spent a total of six non-consecutive weeks on the chart. The song debuted on the UK Singles Chart at number 30 on April 24, 2010, and peaked at number 14 two weeks later on May 29. The song also entered the UK Hip Hop and R&B Singles Chart at number 29 on April 24, 2010, and peaked at number five in the week of May 29. On May 23, 2010, the song entered the Australian Singles Chart and the Swiss Hitparade at numbers 35 and 58, respectively. The song peaked at number 22 in its sixth charting week in Australia, and at number nine in its seventh charting week Switzerland. "Te Amo" debuted at number 11 in Austria on June 25, 2010, and descended to number the following week, but re-peaked at number 11 the next week. The song spent eighteen weeks on the chart. In the Flanders and Wallonia regions of Belgium, "Te Amo" debuted on the singles charts at numbers 29 and 28, respectively, on June 19, 2010, and spent 14 weeks charting. In the Flanders region, the song peaked at number 14, while the song was more successful in the Wallonia region, peaking at number 10.

Elsewhere in Europe, the song debuted on the Italian Singles Chart on July 15, 2010 at number nine and peaked at number seven for two weeks. "Te Amo" was less successful in Denmark, Finland and Norway, peaking at numbers 22, 14, and 12, respectively. In Germany, "Te Amo" became Rihanna's first song as a lead artist since "Hate That I Love You" in 2007 not to reach the top 10, and debuted on the German Singles Chart at number 13 on July 26, 2010. It fluctuated in the top 20 before reaching its peak at number 11 on July 24, 2010. On the European Hot 100 Singles chart, "Te Amo" debuted at number 48 on May 29, 2010 and peaked at number 18 on July 17, 2010. Although "Te Amo" was not released as a single in Canada, the song debuted on the Canadian Hot 100 chart issue dated July 3, 2010 at number 98 and peaked at number 66 on July 17, 2010.

== Promotion ==
=== Music video ===
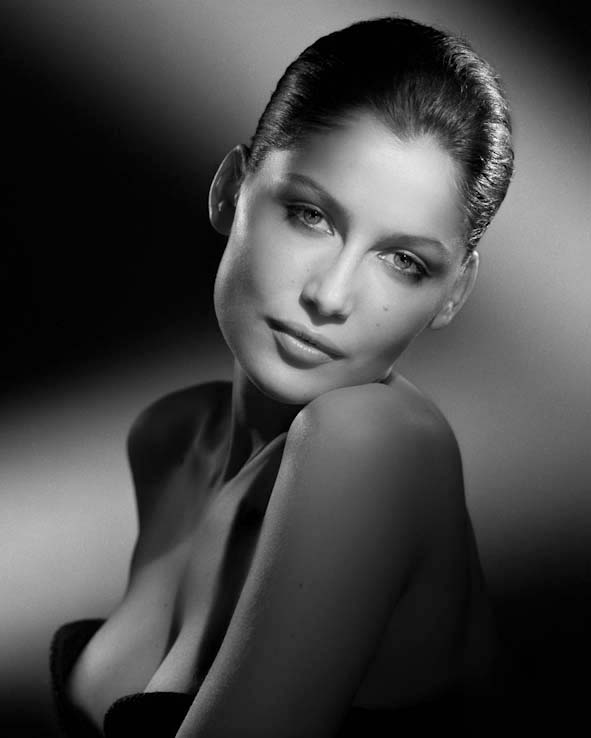
French model Laetitia Casta plays Rihanna's love interest in the music video.

The music video for "Te Amo" was shot over two days on April 29 and 30, 2010, in Vigny, France, and was directed by longtime collaborator Anthony Mandler, who had previously directed the music videos for "Wait Your Turn" and "Russian Roulette". Whilst on set for the video, photographs were released; they featured Rihanna wearing a vibrant Mara Hoffman maxi dress, which cost over $1,000.

In the video, Rihanna plays French supermodel Laetitia Casta's lesbian love interest. Casta arrives at the castle in a car, and steps out with a very provocative dominatrix-looking outfit, and meets Rihanna who is waiting inside. Throughout all of the video, Casta tries to seduce Rihanna whilst Rihanna initially resists, but eventually gives in to Casta's charm. First, she meets Rihanna in the living room and catches her eye. In the next scene, the couple are shown on top of a table with ultraviolet lighting and Casta rubs her head on Rihanna's legs. They are then shown outside the castle and Rihanna falls to the ground in despair while Casta looks on, letting her long hair fall loose and standing seductively. Soon, they are shown in a room full of male dancers and Rihanna begins to feel more comfortable around her admirer. The last two scenes are Rihanna and Casta in PVC bondage outfits kissing and caressing on a bed in a darkened room, and then at a burning table, looking away from each other. Billboard's music video reviewer, Monica Herrera commented, "Rihanna saved a far sexier clip than 'Rockstar 101' for fans abroad." She described the video's various scenes as "Rihanna getting frisky in a bedroom and setting a fire with a sultry female companion."

=== Live performances ===
Rihanna performed "Te Amo" for the first time at Radio 1's Big Weekend 2010 on May 23, 2010 in Bangor, Wales, where she performed the song as part of a set list, along with "Madhouse", "Hard", "Disturbia", "Rude Boy", "Russian Roulette", "Don't Stop the Music", "SOS" and "Umbrella". The song was also included on the set list of the Last Girl on Earth tour. Rihanna performed the song during the Rock in Rio 2011 in Rio de Janeiro.

== Track listing ==
- CD and digital download (2-track)
1. "Te Amo" – 3:28
2. "Rude Boy" (Wideboys stadium radio mix) – 3:16

== Credits and personnel ==
Credits adapted from the inlay cover of Rated R.

Recording

- Recorded at Metropolis Studios, London
- Mixed at Chung King Studios, New York

Personnel

- Songwriting – Mikkel S. Eriksen, Tor Erik Hermansen, James Fauntleroy II, Robyn Fenty
- Production – Stargate
- Vocal production – Mikkel S. Eriksen
- Vocal recording – Mikkel S. Eriksen, Marcus Tovar
- Vocal recording assistant – Ross Parkin, Neil Tucker
- Mixing – Kevin "KD" Davis
- Assistant mixing – Anthony Patozzole
- Guitar – Bert Rune Stray, Miguel "Che" aka El Miggy
- All other instruments – Mikkel S. Eriksen, Tor Erik Hermansen

== Charts ==
=== Weekly charts ===
Weekly chart performance
Chart (2010)	Peak position
Australia (ARIA)	22
Austria (Ö3 Austria Top 40)	11
Belgium (Ultratop 50 Flanders)	10
Belgium (Ultratop 50 Wallonia)	14
Brazil (Billboard Hot 100)	1
Brazil (Billboard Hot Pop Songs)	1
Canada Hot 100 (Billboard)	66
CIS Airplay (TopHit)	27
Croatia International Airplay (HRT)	7
Czech Republic Airplay (ČNS IFPI)	6
Denmark (Tracklisten)	22
Europe (European Hot 100 Singles)	18
Finland (Suomen virallinen lista)	14
France (SNEP) Download Charts	8
Germany (GfK)	11
Hungary (Rádiós Top 40)	7
Hungary (Single Top 40)	5
Ireland (IRMA)	16
Israel International Airplay (Media Forest)	10
Italy (FIMI)	7
Luxembourg Digital Song Sales (Billboard)	9
Netherlands (Dutch Top 40)	31
Norway (VG-lista)	12
Poland (ZPAV)	2
Portugal Digital Song Sales (Billboard)	2
Russia Airplay (TopHit)	24
Scottish Singles Sales (Official Charts)	21
Slovakia Airplay (ČNS IFPI)	34
Sweden (Sverigetopplistan)	48
Switzerland (Schweizer Hitparade)	9
UK Singles (Official Charts)	14
UK Hip Hop/R&B (Official Charts)	5

=== Year-end charts ===
Year-end chart performance
Chart (2009)	Position
Brazil (Crowley)	14

Chart (2010)	Position
Austria (Ö3 Austria Top 40)	61
Belgium (Ultratop Flanders)	64
Belgium (Ultratop Wallonia)	78
CIS (TopHit)	76
Croatia International Airplay (HRT)	26
Europe (European Hot 100 Singles)	81
Germany (Official German Charts)	48
Hungary (Rádiós Top 40)	63
Italy (FIMI)	36
Italy Airplay (EarOne)	22
Russia Airplay (TopHit)	74
Switzerland (Schweizer Hitparade)	43
UK (OCC)	96

== Certifications ==
Certifications
Region	Certification	Certified units/sales
Australia (ARIA)	2× Platinum	140,000^{‡}
Brazil (Pro-Música Brasil)	2× Platinum	120,000^{‡}
Denmark (IFPI Danmark)	Gold	45,000^{‡}
Germany (BVMI)	Gold	150,000^{‡}
Italy (FIMI)	Platinum	30,000^{*}
New Zealand (RMNZ)	Platinum	30,000^{‡}
Switzerland (IFPI Switzerland)	Gold	15,000^{^}
United Kingdom (BPI)	Platinum	600,000^{‡}
United States (RIAA)	Gold	500,000^{‡}
^{*} Sales figures based on certification alone.^{^} Shipments figures based on certification alone.^{‡} Sales+streaming figures based on certification alone.

== Release history ==
Release dates and formats
Region	Date	Format	Version	Label	Ref.
Italy	May 28, 2010	Radio airplay	Original	Universal	
Australia	June 8, 2010	Digital download	2-track	Island Def Jam	
Italy	June 8, 2010	Digital download	2-track	Island Def Jam	
New Zealand	June 8, 2010	Digital download	2-track	Island Def Jam	
Germany	June 11, 2010	CD	2-track	Def Jam	
