= Hard (Rihanna song) =

2009 single by Rihanna

Single by Rihanna featuring Jeezy

from the album Rated R
- Released: November 10, 2009
- Recorded: 2009
- Studio: Studios Devout (Paris, France); The Boom Boom Room (Burbank, California); Legacy Recording Studios (New York City, New York); Triangle Sound Studios (Atlanta, Georgia)
- Genre: Hip-hop
- Length: 4:10
- Label: Def Jam; SRP
- Songwriters: Terius Nash; Christopher Stewart; Robyn Fenty; Jay Jenkins
- Producers: Tricky Stewart; The-Dream

Rihanna singles chronology
"Russian Roulette" (2009)	"Hard" (2009)	"Wait Your Turn" (2009)

Young Jeezy singles chronology
"Fed Up" (2009)	"Hard" (2009)	"Put Your Hands Up" (2010)

Music video
- "Hard" on YouTube

"Hard" is a song by the Barbadian singer Rihanna from her fourth studio album, Rated R (2009). The song features a guest verse from American rapper Young Jeezy, credited only as "Jeezy" on the album (and who is now officially known as such). The artists co-wrote the song with its producers, The-Dream and Tricky Stewart. "Hard" was sent to radio by Def Jam Recordings on November 10, 2009, as the second United States single from Rated R. It is a hip hop song and features military horns, hissing synthesizers, sharp beats and piano chords.

The song became Rihanna's thirteenth top ten single on the US Billboard Hot 100, matching Beyoncé as the female artist with the most US top ten songs since 2000. It was certified platinum by the Recording Industry Association of America. An accompanying music video, directed by Melina Matsoukas, was filmed in Los Angeles. In the video, Rihanna commands an army while clothed in stylized military costumes. After the video premiere, the song charted in Canada, New Zealand and the United Kingdom. Rihanna performed "Hard" at Jay-Z's concert at UCLA Pauley Pavilion and at the 2009 American Music Awards. The song was also included on the set lists of the Last Girl on Earth Tour (2010–11) and the Loud Tour (2011).

== Background and composition ==
"Hard"
A 25-second audio sample of Rihanna singing the chorus of the song, which features militant horns, hissing synths, sharp beats and piano notes

In an interview with MTV News, producer Mikkel S. Eriksen of Stargate initially confirmed "Wait Your Turn" as the second single from Rated R; however, "Hard" was ultimately chosen instead. Hard (The Remixes) was made available for digital download on January 19, 2010 in the United States. In an interview with MTV, Rihanna explained that while she was in Paris, Christopher "Tricky" Stewart and The-Dream played a few songs for her, which included "Hard". Rihanna decided to record the song because it was different from her normal creative output. Stewart, in an interview with Rap-Up, spoke about the song before its title or any details were released, describing the song as "edgy" and a "club banger". When asked if the song was bigger than Rihanna's commercially successful song "Umbrella", he said, "No, it's different. It's a superstar taking a step in a totally different direction." "Hard" is the first song for which Jeezy was credited thus, instead of under his enduring stage name "Young Jeezy".

"Hard" incorporates musical elements of hip hop and is four minutes and ten seconds long. It features militant horns, hissing synths, sharp beats and piano notes. It is written in the key of B minor and set in common time with a pop and R&B groove and a tempo of 91 beats per minute. Rihanna's vocal range in the song ranges from the low note of G_{3} to the high note of B_{4}. As noted by Ailbhe Malone of NME, Rihanna adopts Jay-Z's vocal style in the lyric, "Brilliant, resilient, fan mail from 27 million." "Hard" is a song about emulating power and strength, and how Rihanna assumes a role of being the best at what she does. Ryan Dombell of Pitchfork Media wrote that the song is "a strutting statement of power".

== Critical reception ==
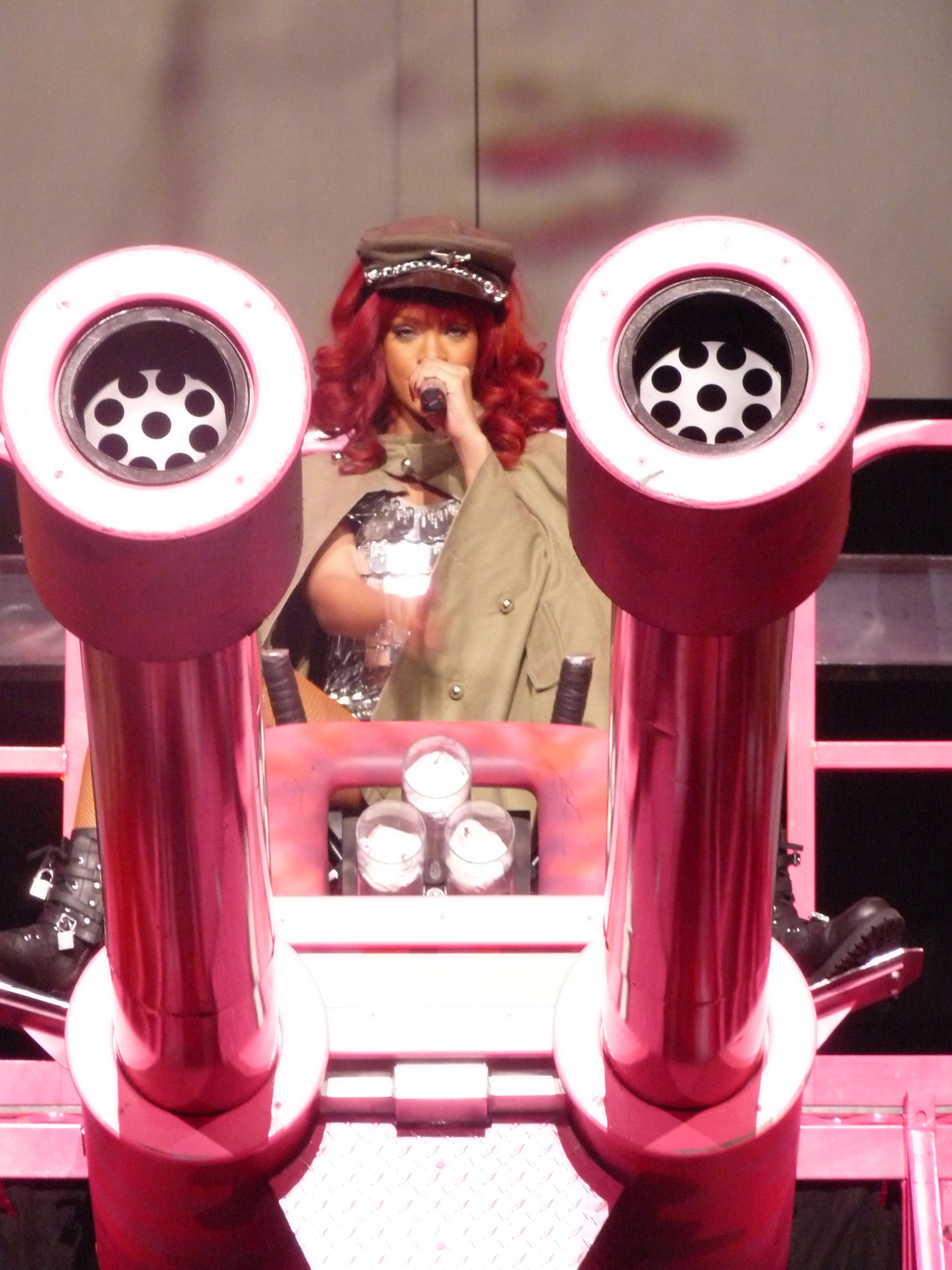
Rihanna performing "Hard" on the Loud Tour in Sunrise, Florida, sitting on an army tank similar to the one featured in the music video

Greg Kot of the Chicago Tribune said that Rihanna lashes out on the song, with "help from an even harder-edged MC, Young Jeezy." Monica Herrerra of Billboard magazine wrote: "Rihanna effectively assumes the hip-hop posture and even recruits the ultimate street cred booster in rapper Young Jeezy, who provides the thrust needed to send a song with a somewhat inert chorus home". Herrerra continued, "Though 'Hard' doesn't find Rihanna in her typical comfort zone, the atypical is precisely what she has aimed for with her new material—and it works". Alexis Petridis of The Guardian called "Hard" and "Rude Boy" the highlights of Rated R, and wrote, "both of which exploit Rihanna's most appealing vocal style, a sulky, icy, monotone". Petridis also noted that the song "undercuts the standard braggathon of Hard—'fan mail from 27 million'". Leah Greenblatt of Entertainment Weekly commented on Rihanna's vocal style and the persona she adopts in the song. Greenblatt wrote, "Rihanna dons hip-hop swagger like borrowed armor, leaning heavily on her Caribbean accent and unleashing a string of baddest-bitch boasts via dancehall-riddim'd bangers like 'Hard,' 'G4L,' and 'Wait Your Turn'". Ryan Dombell of Pitchfork Media wrote, "the bulletproof guise is good for the record's high point on 'Hard', a strutting statement of power bolstered by a roiling undertow of a beat from 'Umbrella' producer Tricky Stewart."

== Chart performance ==
In the United States, "Hard" peaked at number eight on January 30, 2010. It became Rihanna's thirteenth US top ten Hot 100 single, and Rihanna equaled Beyoncé as the female artist with the most US top ten singles since 2000. The song reached number one on the US Dance Club Songs chart on March 6, 2010, reached number nine on the US Mainstream Top 40, and number 14 on the Hot R&B/Hip-Hop Songs chart. "Hard" was certified two-times platinum by the Recording Industry Association of America (RIAA), denoting sales of over 2,000,000 copies.

Although the single was not released internationally, it charted in several countries after the release of the music video. In Canada, it peaked for one week at number nine on February 6, 2010. In New Zealand, it debuted at number 40 on January 11, 2010, and peaked at number 15 in its fifth week, and it stayed in the top twenty for a further two weeks. "Hard" debuted and peaked at number 26 on the Swedish Singles Chart on January 22, 2010. It dropped off the chart for a week, but re-entered at number 55. In the United Kingdom, "Hard" debuted at number 46 on the UK R&B Chart on January 16, 2010, peaking at number 17 on January 23, 2010. The same day, the song debuted at number 55 on the UK Singles Chart, and peaked at number 42 the following week. "Hard" spent another six weeks on the chart, descending to number 100 on February 24, 2010, and leaving the chart on March 3, 2010. It re-entered the UK Singles Chart at number 64 on August 28, 2010, and fell to number 89 the following week. In total, it spent ten non-consecutive weeks on the UK singles chart.

== Music video ==
=== Background and synopsis ===
The music video for "Hard" was directed by Melina Matsoukas and released in December 2009. It was the first Rihanna video directed by Matsoukas, who would go on to direct videos for "Rude Boy" and "Rockstar 101". Before the premiere of the video, Rihanna told Kyle Anderson of MTV News: "It's couture-military. Everything is surrounded by the whole idea of something military. We have tanks, we have troops, we've got helicopters, we've got explosions.[...] Tight gear, lots of cute outfits, lots of bullets. Crazy."

Rihanna in one of the many desert scenes, wearing a couture dress with spiked shoulder pads

The video's first scene is set in a desert at night. Rihanna, wearing a garrison cap, sunglasses, and a stylized white top, stands in front of an army. This scene is intercut with scenes of Rihanna in a bunker; she wears an army hard hat, pink lace up boots, and a skin-colored top with small black rectangles covering her breasts. Halfway through the first verse, the scene changes to a daytime desert scene in which Rihanna wears a low cut, short black dress with spiked shoulder pads, and walks through the location as small explosions occur around her.

As the first chorus begins, earlier scenes from the video are intercut with each other; Rihanna is shown commanding her troops, firing a machine gun, and dancing in the bunker. As the second verse begins, Rihanna is seen with slicked-back hair wearing a metal bikini top, rolling in mud and surrounded by troops on a stone structure before a mountainous backdrop. She is shown gambling with (and winning against) soldiers in another bunker.

As the second chorus starts, Rihanna, wearing a bullet bra and a helmet similar in appearance to the ears of Mickey Mouse, stands on a pink army tank. During Jeezy's rap verse, Jeezy is seen in the middle of a crosshair, and explosions occur around Rihanna. During the bridge and final chorus of the song, scenes of Rihanna from throughout the video are intercut with each other. In this sequence, Rihanna wears a high-waisted black bikini and waves a large black flag with a white "R" in the middle of it.

=== Reception ===
Peter Gaston of Spin wrote that the video for "Hard" resembles "Janet Jackson's 'Rhythm Nation' meets Christina Aguilera's 'Dirrty' phase—Rihanna vamps in dimly lit outposts, dodges explosions in the desert, and, quite enticingly, takes a break from boot camp to smother herself with mud. Morale-boosting, indeed!" James Dinh of MTV News showed the video, on a small player, to fans in Times Square in New York City to ask their opinions. Most said she looked "sexy" in the video, and agreed that it was different from previous videos and shows where she came from and where she is going in her personal life. Bill Lamb of About.com wrote, "I must confess that I do fail to understand the point of Rihanna humping the gun turret of a pink tank dressed in Mickey Mouse ears. It seems pains were taken to make the setting look like Afghanistan or Iraq with the other actors looking as close to real military personnel as possible." Lamb criticized the video's lack of sensitivity and respect for using an army and weapons of destruction to glamorize war, saying, "Does Def Jam, Rihanna's label, need to be reminded that this comes on the heels of sadly sending off an additional 30,000 troops from our country to real war? In my mind this is one of the most tasteless, offensive moves by a major pop artist in recent memory."

== Live performances ==
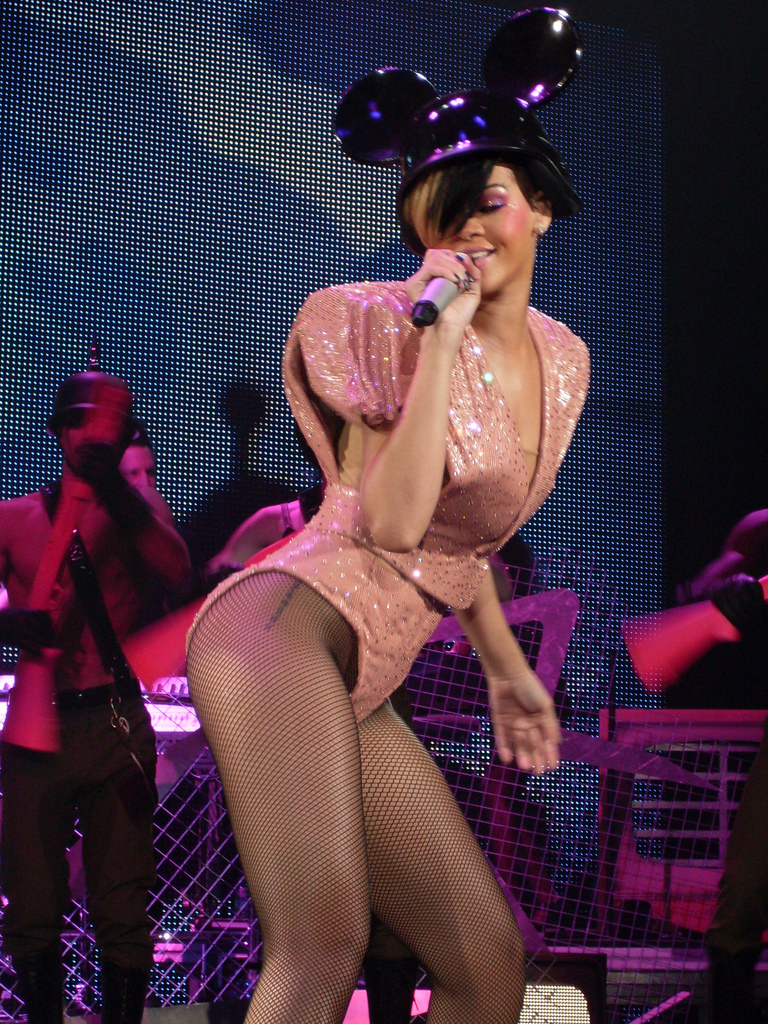
Rihanna performing "Hard" on her Last Girl on Earth Tour, wearing the same mouse-eared helmet as in the music video

Rihanna performed "Hard" live for the first time on November 8, 2009 at Jay-Z's concert at UCLA Pauley Pavilion. To promote Rated R in the UK, Rihanna performed the song with Jeezy at the launch of the Nokia X6 smartphone at Brixton Academy in London. Other songs on the set list were "Russian Roulette" and "Wait Your Turn" from Rated R, and "Don't Stop the Music", "Take a Bow", "Disturbia", and "Umbrella" (with Jay-Z).

Rihanna performed "Hard" live at the 2009 American Music Awards on November 22, 2009, at the Nokia Theatre in Los Angeles, California, as part of a medley with "Wait Your Turn". Gil Kaufman of MTV wrote that Rihanna was wearing a "skintight white catsuit bisected by cut-out lines that revealed horizontal lines of skin across her body, spiked shoulder pads, white studded cuffs and a barbed-wire bracelet snaking up her right forearm". The performance started with a science fiction themed video clip, which featured robots performing a surgical operation on Rihanna. After finishing "Wait Your Turn", Rihanna began singing "Hard"; red lasers were shone across the stage and audience, and red tracer beams shone from Rihanna's spiked shoulder pads. On December 5, 2010, Rihanna made her Saturday Night Live debut performance, singing "Russian Roulette" and "Hard", with Jeezy accompanying her performance of the latter. Rihanna also sang "Hard" on BET's 106 & Park on December 10, 2009, and on NBC's "New Year's Eve with Carson Daly 2010".

To promote the single's release in the US, Rihanna appeared on The Ellen DeGeneres Show on February 1, 2010, where she sang "Hard" and "Don't Stop the Music". The following day, Rihanna recorded some video performances of her songs for AOL Music Sessions, which were made available to watch on AOL's website on February 23, 2010. The set included Rihanna's singles "Russian Roulette", "Hard", "Take a Bow", and a stripped-down version of "Disturbia". On February 4, 2010, she performed "Hard" at the Super Bowl Fan Jam on VH1, sharing billing with Timbaland and Justin Bieber.

On March 27, 2010, Rihanna performed the song as part of a medley with "Rude Boy" and "Don't Stop the Music" at the 2010 Nickelodeon Kids' Choice Awards at UCLA's Pauley Pavilion in Westwood, California. The performance featured a large camouflage tank and two robots, similar to those used for Rihanna's performance at the ECHO Awards, where she performed "Rude Boy". Rihanna performed "Hard" at Radio 1's Big Weekend 2010 on May 23, 2010 in Bangor, Wales, where she also performed "Mad House", "Disturbia", "Rude Boy", "Te Amo", "Russian Roulette", "Don't Stop the Music", "SOS", and "Umbrella". "Hard" was included on the set list of Rihanna's Last Girl on Earth and Loud tours. Rihanna performed "Hard" at Radio 1's Hackney Weekend on May 24, 2012, as the twelfth song on the set list. The performance featured a giant sphinx on the stage.

== Format and track listing ==
Digital download (the remixes)

1. "Hard" (Jump Smokers radio edit) – 3:10
2. "Hard" (Chew Fu granite fix radio edit) – 3:43
3. "Hard" (Jody den Broeder radio edit) – 3:30
4. "Hard" (Jump Smokers extended) – 3:36
5. "Hard" (Chew Fu granite fix extended) – 5:27
6. "Hard" (Jody den Broeder club Remix) – 6:43
7. "Hard" (Jody den Broeder dub) – 6:45

== Credits and personnel ==
Credits adapted from the liner notes of Rated R.

- Terius "The-Dream" Nash, Christopher "Tricky" Stewart, Robyn "Rihanna" Fenty and Jay Jenkins – Songwriting
- Christopher "Tricky" Stewart and Terius "The-Dream" Nash – Production
- Ross Parkin – Assistant recorder
- Makeba Riddick – Vocal production
- Marcos Tovar, Brian "B-LUV" Thomas, Karl Heilbron, Andrew Wuepper, Chris "TEK" O'Ryan and Pat Thrall for Rihanna. – Engineer
- Cédric Culnaërt, Sébastien Salis, Luis Navarro, Tyler Van Dalen, Jason Sherwood and Steven Dennis – Assistant Engineer
- Jaycen Joshua at Penua Project at Larrabee Studios, Universal City, California, United States – Mixing
- Giancarlo Lino – Assistant mixer
- Monte Neuble – Additional keys
- Studios Devout, Paris, France; The Boom Boom Room, Burbank, California, United States; Legacy Recording Studios, New York City, New York, United States and Triangle Sound Studios, Atlanta, Georgia, United States. – Recording

== Charts ==
=== Weekly charts ===
Chart (2009–2010)	Peak position
Australia (ARIA)	51
Belgium (Ultratip Bubbling Under Wallonia)	12
Canada Hot 100 (Billboard)	9
Ireland (IRMA)	33
Japan Hot 100 (Billboard)	82
New Zealand (Recorded Music NZ)	15
Slovakia Airplay (ČNS IFPI)	21
Sweden (Sverigetopplistan)	26
UK Singles (Official Charts)	42
UK R&B (OCC)	23
US Billboard Hot 100	8
US Dance Airplay (Billboard)	5
US Dance Club Songs (Billboard)	1
US Hot R&B/Hip-Hop Songs (Billboard)	14
US Pop Airplay (Billboard)	9
US Rhythmic Airplay (Billboard)	4

=== Year-end charts ===
Chart (2010)	Position
Brazil (Crowley)	28
Canada (Canadian Hot 100)	72
US Billboard Hot 100	49
US Dance Club Songs (Billboard)	30
US Hot R&B/Hip-Hop Songs (Billboard)	66

== Certifications ==
Region	Certification	Certified units/sales
Australia (ARIA)	Gold	35,000^{‡}
United Kingdom (BPI)	Silver	200,000^{‡}
United States (RIAA)	2× Platinum	2,000,000^{‡}
^{‡} Sales+streaming figures based on certification alone.

== Release history ==
"Hard" release history
Region	Date	Format	Version	Label(s)	Ref.
United States	November 10, 2009	Rhythmic contemporary radio	Original	SRP; Def Jam; Island Def Jam	
United States	November 10, 2009	Urban contemporary radio	Original	SRP; Def Jam; Island Def Jam	
United States	November 23, 2009	Contemporary hit radio	Original	SRP; Def Jam; Island Def Jam	
United States	January 19, 2010	Digital download	The remixes	Island Def Jam	

== See also ==
- List of Billboard Hot Dance Club Songs number ones of 2010
