= Wait Your Turn =

Single by Rihanna

from the album Rated R
- Released: November 13, 2009
- Recorded: 2009
- Studio: Metropolis Studios (London, England)
- Genre: Dubstep; hip-hop
- Length: 3:46
- Label: Def Jam; SRP
- Songwriters: James Fauntleroy II; Mikkel S. Eriksen; Tor Erik Hermansen; Will Kennard; Saul Milton; Takura Tendayi; Robyn Fenty
- Producers: StarGate; Chase & Status

Rihanna singles chronology
"Hard" (2009)	"Wait Your Turn" (2009)	"Rude Boy" (2010)

Music video
- "Wait Your Turn" on YouTube

"Wait Your Turn" is a song recorded by the Barbadian singer Rihanna for her fourth album, Rated R (2009). It was written by Mikkel S. Eriksen, Tor Erik Hermansen, Saul Milton, Will Kennard, James Fauntleroy II, Takura Tendayi, and Rihanna herself. Stargate (Eriksen and Hermansen) and Chase & Status (Milton and Kennard) produced the song. "Wait Your Turn" was released on November 13, 2009, as the second international and third overall single from Rated R.

Upon the release of Rated R, some critics noted the diverse musical variety on the album, whilst others commented on the heavy influence of dubstep on the song. The song was not a commercial success, becoming one of her worst performing singles to date. "Wait Your Turn" peaked inside the top twenty on the UK R&B Chart. The song failed to enter the US Billboard Hot 100 chart, making this Rihanna's second single that failed to reach that chart ("We Ride"), and one of few singles to not enter the chart. The song was performed live as part of a medley with "Hard" at the 2009 American Music Awards and on Good Morning America, along with "Russian Roulette" and "Umbrella". The song was also included on the set list of the Last Girl on Earth Tour (2010–11). As part of promotion for the release of Rated R, a music video was directed by Rihanna's longtime collaborator Anthony Mandler. A remix of the song features American rapper, and a member of Slaughterhouse, Joell Ortiz.

== Background and release ==
"Wait Your Turn" was written by Tor Erik Hermansen, Mikkel S. Eriksen, Saul Milton, Will Kennard, James Fauntleroy II, Takura Tendayi and Rihanna, with production of the song helmed by the former four, under their stage names StarGate and Chase & Status, respectively. It comes from the recording sessions for the Rated R album, which took place during March to November 2009 at several recording studios throughout United States and Europe. After the song leaked online toward the end of October 2009, it was used in a promotional video for her first televised interviews since the alleged assault on her by then-boyfriend Chris Brown, singing the line, "The wait is ova", which is part of the lyrics. Eriksen of StarGate, who co-produced the song, had confirmed "Wait Your Turn" as the second single from Rated R; it was later released as the second international and third overall single. The song was made available for digital download via iTunes on November 13, 2009, in Australia, Austria, Brazil, Finland, Italy, Norway, Spain, Sweden and Switzerland. The song interpolates "The Bridge Is Over" by Boogie Down Productions.

== Composition ==
"Wait Your Turn"
A sample of the song's chorus, which met with a positive response from music critics, with Alexis Petridis of The Guardian writing that the song is a "hypnotic, dirgey electronic grind of Wait Your Turn, Gangsta 4 Life's druggy, intoxicating mix of backwards drums, minor-key verses and spectral backing vocals."

"Wait Your Turn" was one of many songs featured on Rated R that incorporates musical genres different from any of Rihanna's previous work, drawing heavily on dubstep and hip hop genres. In her review of Rated R, Ailbhe Malone of NME briefly commented on the song, calling it "an electric backstreet stiletto stab, where, eyebrow cocked, Rihanna sings 'I’m such a fucking lady/You don’t have to be afraid.'" Leah Greenblatt of Entertainment Weekly observed that Rihanna was drawing a lot of inspiration for several of the songs on the album from her Bajan background and heritage, most noticeably in her style of singing, saying "Throughout, Rihanna dons hip-hop swagger like borrowed armor, leaning heavily on her Caribbean accent and unleashing a string of baddest-bitch boasts via dancehall-riddim'd bangers like 'Hard', 'G4L' and 'Wait Your Turn.'" Alexis Petridis of The Guardian referred to "Wait Your Turn" as a response to Rihanna trying to move on from her innocent "Umbrella" pop star image, commenting "At the other, however, the desire to escape the single's vast shadow has clearly led some of her collaborators to indulge in feats of impressively risky invention: the hypnotic, dirgey electronic grind of Wait Your Turn, Gangsta 4 Life's druggy, intoxicating mix of backwards drums, minor-key verses and spectral backing vocals."

== Reception ==
=== Critical response ===
Greg Kot of The Chicago Tribune noted that Rihanna assumes the role of playing the victim in the song, and not the offender, saying "She's wary of men even when she’s flirting with them in 'Wait Your Turn'." Prior to Greenblatt's album review of Rated R, where she briefly commented on "Wait Your Turn", she also reviewed the song when it leaked onto the Internet in early November, saying "Now that the wait is nearly ova, are you feeling it, Music Mixers? I cannot tell a lie; I’m a little underwhelmed by this new walk-the-plank Pirate incarnation." William Goodman of Spin magazine was more critical and dismissive of the song, saying "'Wait Your Turn' ...leaked online over the weekend, and like the album's lead track, 'Russian Roulette,' it's a total let down: clunky, Auto-Tuned vocals repeat 'The wait is ova / The wait is ova' ad nauseam, over dark atmospherics and a spare dub beat that fails to connect ...it's certainly not worth the wait."

=== Chart performance ===
"Wait Your Turn" made its first chart appearance on November 26, 2009, on the Irish Singles Chart, where it debuted at number 32 and remained for one week before falling out of the Top 50. The song debuted on the UK Singles Chart at number 45 on December 5, before dropping to number 75 the following week, which was its last appearance on the chart. However, the song was more successful on the UK R&B Chart, where it debuted at number 17 on December 5, where it stayed in the Top 40 for three consecutive weeks. The song has since sold 20,000 digital copies in the UK. On the week commencing December 7, "Wait Your Turn" debuted on the Australian Singles Chart at number 82, before dropping out of the chart the following week.

== Music video ==
The music video for "Wait Your Turn" was filmed on October 16, 2009, in New York City and was directed by Anthony Mandler, who had previously directed the majority of Rihanna's music videos, including "Take a Bow" and "Rehab". Music video was edited by Nabil Mechi from Murex, who previously edit videos for "S.O.S." and "Umbrella". The music video made its premiere on November 9, 2009. In an interview with MTV News, Mandler spoke of the conceptualization of the video as well as the inspiration behind it:

We shot the clip in mid-October on a cold day in New York City. The vibe and feeling was great ... It was the first video for the album, so obviously everyone was excited and focused on setting the tone for what's to come. Rihanna and I spoke in depth about creating a piece that was gritty, raw and more of a street video then a classic beauty piece ... We loved the energy and bravado of early hip-hop videos that were made without a lot of resources, working more with the textures and shapes of the surroundings, then trying to build and manipulate environments as we have done in the past ... I wanted to try and take everything we have done in the past and put it to the side.

It starts with a series of shots displaying Rihanna wearing a black eye-patch, a high-necked jacket and suspenders, and was filmed in a black and white grainy fashion, whilst Rihanna recites the lyrics "The wait is ova". Scenes are then intercut with shots of Rihanna wearing a black hooded top, in what appears to be a Church, which is followed by Rihanna changing outfits, again wearing a black bra top and a fur coat sitting on a pair of Angel's wings for the chorus. For the bridge of the song, Rihanna is featured in yet another change of outfit, this time wearing a white vest top and black fur coat, standing on the roof top of a New York skyscraper, with other tall buildings in the background. As Rihanna sings the final chorus, scenes from throughout the video are intercut with each other, with the new addition of Rihanna shown to be wearing what she wore at the start of the video in an underpass.

== Live performances ==
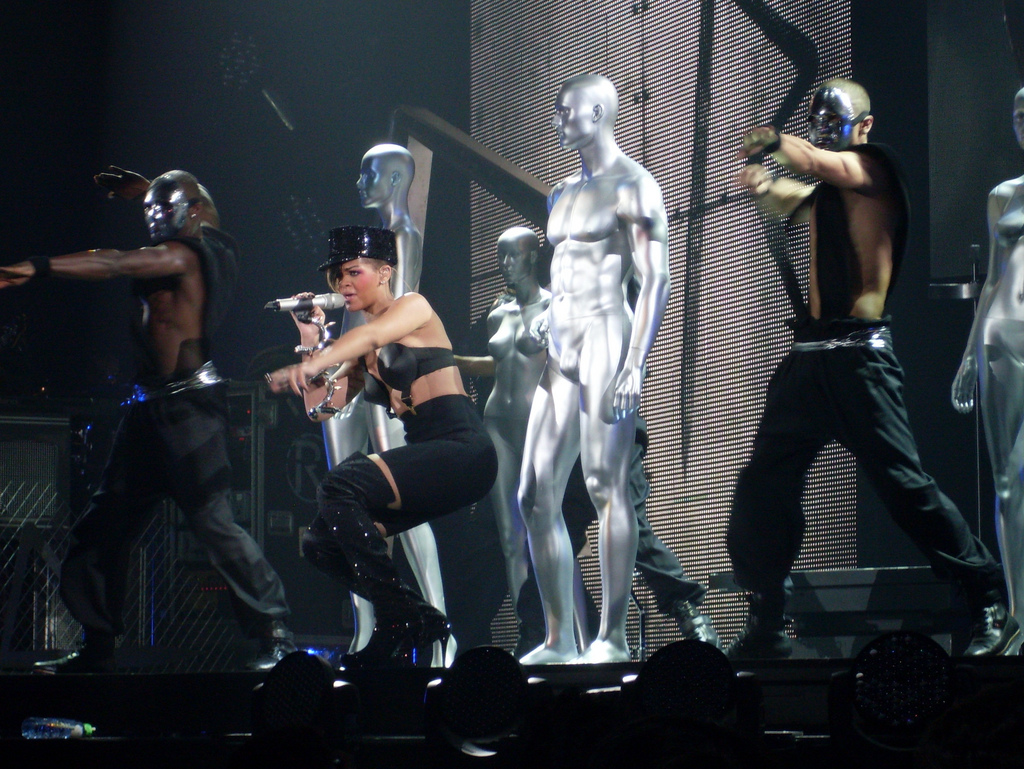
Rihanna performing "Wait Your Turn" on her Last Girl on Earth Tour

As part of promotion of Rated R in the United Kingdom, Rihanna performed the song for the first time at the launch of the Nokia X6 smartphone at Brixton Academy in London. She performed the song as part of a set list which included songs from the album, including "Russian Roulette" and "Hard", for the latter of which Rihanna was joined on stage by Young Jeezy, who is featured on the song. The set also saw Rihanna perform other songs from her repertoire, including "Don't Stop the Music", "Take a Bow", "Disturbia" and "Umbrella"; for the last of these, Rihanna was joined on stage by Jay-Z to perform the song.

Rihanna performed the song live for the first time at the 2009 American Music Awards, which was televised on November 22, 2009, at the Nokia Theatre in Los Angeles, California, as part of a medley with the second single released from the album, "Hard". In his review of the performance, Gil Kaufman of MTV commented on the main aspects of the spectacle, commenting that she was wearing a "skintight white catsuit bisected by cut-out lines that revealed horizontal lines of skin across her body, spiked shoulder pads, white studded cuffs and a barbed-wire bracelet snaking up her right forearm." The performance started with a sci-fi themed video clip, which featured Rihanna being operated on by robots. After finishing "Wait Your Turn," Rihanna transitioned into "Hard", whilst red lasers shone throughout the stage and audience, as well as from her spiked shoulder pads.

On November 24, 2009, Rihanna appeared on Good Morning America, where she performed "Wait Your Turn" and "Russian Roulette" from Rated R as well as "Umbrella" from Good Girl Gone Bad (2007). The set featured Rihanna wearing "a white sequined blazer with a little black shirt underneath and stilettos", and was joined on stage by a group of dancers, who were all dressed in black. Rihanna also gave a short interview about the album and the level of energy which was put into it, saying "It came very natural only because it was my place of peace, being the studio just venting. It was the one place I didn't feel judged or criticized. Every emotion went into that album." The song was also included on the set list of the Last Girl on Earth Tour (2010–11) in the encore section, as part of a medley with "Live Your Life" and "Run This Town", before performing "Umbrella" as the final song. On June 24, 2012, Rihanna performed at the BBC Radio 1's Hackney Weekend. She performed "Wait Your Turn" as part of a set list which also included songs from her fifth and sixth sequel studio albums. The performance featured giant sphinx on the stage.

== Personnel ==
Credits adapted from the liner notes of Rated R.

- James Fauntleroy II, Mikkel S. Eriksen, Tor Erik Hermansen, Will Kennard, Saul Milton, Takura Tendayi and Robyn "Rihanna" Fenty – Songwriting
- StarGate and Chase & Status – Production
- Mikkel S. Eriksen – Vocal production
- Kevin "KD" Davis at Chalice Recording Studios, Hollywood, California – Mixing
- Mikkel S. Eriksen, Tor Erik Hermansen and Chase & Status – Instrumentation
- Metropolis Studios, London – Recording

== Charts ==
Chart (2009)	Peak position
Australia (ARIA)	82
Ireland (IRMA)	32
Italy (FIMI)	91
South Korea International Singles (Gaon)	192
UK Singles (OCC)	45
UK R&B (OCC)	17
US Bubbling Under Hot 100 Singles (Billboard)	10

== Release history ==
Region	Date	Format	Label
Australia	November 13, 2009	Digital download	Def Jam Recordings
Austria	November 13, 2009	Digital download	Def Jam Recordings
Brazil	November 13, 2009	Digital download	Def Jam Recordings
Finland	November 13, 2009	Digital download	Def Jam Recordings
Italy	November 13, 2009	Digital download	Def Jam Recordings
Norway	November 13, 2009	Digital download	Def Jam Recordings
Spain	November 13, 2009	Digital download	Def Jam Recordings
Sweden	November 13, 2009	Digital download	Def Jam Recordings
Switzerland	November 13, 2009	Digital download	Def Jam Recordings
