= Rockstar 101 =

2010 single by Rihanna

Single by Rihanna featuring Slash

from the album Rated R
- Released: May 18, 2010
- Recorded: 2009
- Studio: Serenity Sound (Los Angeles, California); The Boom Boom Room (Burbank, California); Triangle Sound (Atlanta, Georgia)
- Genre: Grunge-crunk; hip hop
- Length: 3:58
- Label: Def Jam; SRP
- Songwriters: Terius "The-Dream" Nash; Christopher "Tricky" Stewart; Robyn Fenty
- Producers: The-Dream; Tricky Stewart; Makeba Riddick (vocals)

Rihanna singles chronology
"Rude Boy" (2010)	"Rockstar 101" (2010)	"Te Amo" (2010)

Slash singles chronology
"By the Sword" (2010)	"Rockstar 101" (2010)	"Back from Cali" (2010)

Music video
- "Rockstar 101" on YouTube

"Rockstar 101" (stylized as in all caps) is a song by Barbadian singer Rihanna from her fourth studio album, Rated R (2009). The song features the British-American guitarist Slash of the rock group Guns N' Roses. It was released on May 18, 2010, as the fifth single from the album. Rihanna wrote the song in collaboration with the producers The-Dream and Christopher "Tricky" Stewart; vocal production was carried out by Makeba Riddick. The album version is a grunge-crunk and hip hop song, while the remix EP's consist of dance, dubstep and electronic music adaptations, some of which were remixed by Dave Audé and Mark Picchiotti.

Critical response to "Rockstar 101" was mixed; some critics praised Rihanna's bravado while others criticized the aggressive tone. The song charted at number 64 on the United States' Billboard Hot 100 chart, and number two on the Dance Club Songs chart. To promote the song, Rihanna performed on American Idol in April 2010. It has been included on the set lists of her Last Girl on Earth (2010–11) and Diamonds World Tour (2013). Melina Matsoukas directed the song's music video, which portrays Rihanna impersonating Slash. She wears custom made jewelry designed by Fannie Schiavoni in some parts of the video, while Blink-182 drummer Travis Barker makes a cameo appearance.

== Background and release ==
Rihanna co-wrote "Rockstar 101" in collaboration with the song's producers The-Dream and Christopher "Tricky" Stewart. Her vocals and the instrumentation for the song were recorded at Serenity Sound Studios in Los Angeles, California, the Boom Boom Room in Burbank, California and Triangle Sound Studios in Atlanta, Georgia. It was mixed by Jaycen Joshua at Larrabee Studios in Universal City, California; he was assisted in the process by Giancarlo Lino. Rihanna's vocals were produced by Makeba Riddick. The song was engineered by Marcus Tovar, Brian "B-LUV" Thomas, Andrew Wuepper and Chris "TEK" O'Ryan. Additional engineering was done by Pat Thrall. Guitar was provided by Tim Stewart, while Monte Neuble performed additional keys. The song features a guitar performance by Slash, the British-American musician, songwriter and lead guitarist of the American hard rock band Guns N' Roses.

"Rockstar 101" was the fourth single from the album Rated R to be released in the US and the sixth overall. It was sent to contemporary hit and rhythmic radio stations in the US on May 18, 2010, and to Australian radio stations on July 19, 2010. The song was released as an extended play (EP) in the United States through Masterbeat.com on June 2, 2010, to the iTunes Store on July 13, and in the United Kingdom through Amazon on June 29, 2010. These EP's consist of remixes by various DJs and music producers, including Dave Audé and Mark Picchiotti.

== Composition ==
"Rockstar 101"
A 23-second sample of the song's chorus, which features Slash playing guitar in the background.

"Rockstar 101" is a grunge-crunk and hip hop song which lasts for three minutes and fifty-eight seconds. It features an "aggressive" guitar solo from Slash, according to Leah Greenblatt of Entertainment Weekly. Rihanna uses her lower register and "heavy" modulation to perform most of the song, and she "growls" the lyric "The only thing I'm missing is a black guitar". Rihanna "struts her stuff" as she insists that she is a "big shit talker" as she proclaims that "I'll never play a victim/ I'd rather be a stalker". Sean Fennessey for Spin thought that when Rihanna sings the line "Got my middle finger up, I don't give a fuck", it sounded as though she had never sworn before due to how she preciously mewls the word 'fuck'.

== Critical reception ==
"Rockstar 101" received mixed responses from music critics. Brian Linder for IGN praised the song, writing that it "actually works" despite sounding disjointed at first. Emily Tartanella of PopMatters defined "Rockstar 101" as a "brilliant bit of bravado" during her review of Rated R, while Ailbhe Malone for NME wrote that Rihanna sings with "swagger" on the track, which was something that she has Hova to thank for. Jon Pareles for The New York Times simply highlighted a line from the song, "I never play the victim". Neil McCormick for The Daily Telegraph thought that "Rockstar 101" was one of the few songs on the album to retain the "vaguest leftover hints of her warm Caribbean vocal flavouring". Ann Powers for the Los Angeles Times was critical of Slash's inclusion on the song, and she described it as an "afterthought". Powers wrote "she can definitely get by without that ultimate rock phallic symbol", a reference to Slash. Pitchfork's Ryan Dombell felt that "Rockstar 101", alike "Russian Roulette" and "The Last Song", were "instantly-dated missteps from a bygone era when a Slash feature was cool". He further wrote that "Rockstar 101" and "G4L" were "harder to justify considering their mindless boasts and torpid production". The song was met with a negative review from The Guardian's Alex Petridis, who wrote "At one extreme, the resemblance of 'Umbrella''s chorus to that of a stadium rock ballad seems to have encouraged Rihanna to cut out the middle-man and just start making stadium rock: cue the awful widdly-woo guitars of 'Rockstar 101' and 'Fire Bomb'".

== Chart performance ==
"Rockstar 101" made its first chart appearance on the United States' Billboard Dance Club Songs chart, where it peaked at number two; it stayed on the chart for 14 weeks. The song peaked on the US Hot Digital Songs chart at number 28, spending seven weeks on the chart. It subsequently peaked at number 64 on the US Billboard Hot 100 chart and spent five weeks on the chart. It also peaked at number 10 on the US R&B/Hip-Hop Digital Songs chart. "Rockstar 101" debuted on the Australian Singles Chart at number 50 on August 22, 2010; it peaked at number 24 two weeks later for one week, and remained on the chart for six weeks.

== Music video ==
In the music video still, Rihanna is shown to be nude and covered in black body paint, wearing only a spiked crown and chains, designed by jewelry designer Fannie Schiavoni.

=== Background ===
The director Melina Matsoukas filmed the music video for "Rockstar 101" in April 2010; she had previously directed the videos for Rihanna's singles "Hard" and "Rude Boy". This video was edited by Nabil Mechi from Murex, who previously edit videos for "SOS" and "Umbrella". On May 19, 2010, Rihanna released a 30-second sneak-peek preview of the video on the internet, whilst the full video premiered on May 25, 2010 through the high-definition music video website Vevo.

=== Synopsis ===
According to Jayson Rodriguez of MTV, the video is "a mix of goth bondage-esque voyeurism, complete with Rihanna's gyrating moves and a raging band that features Travis Barker on the drums". Shortly after the video was released, Slash said that he was "flattered" that Rihanna had impersonated him in the video, saying "The video is way better with her being me than with me being me ...all things considered, it brings an element of sexuality to it that I probably wouldn't have been capable of. I think it's hot. Everything works out the way it's supposed to."

Although Slash is featured on "Rockstar 101", he does not appear in the music video. Instead, Rihanna pays homage to him by impersonating him by presenting herself wearing a skull-laden top hat, wig, leather jacket, dark glasses and toothpick: Rihanna can be seen strumming a guitar Slash's style. Rihanna is seen in eight different scenes and settings, one of which showed an almost nude Rihanna covered in black body paint wearing only a spiked crown and jewelry chains, which were created by designer Fannie Schiavoni. In other scenes, Rihanna smashes a black electric guitar and can be seen wearing an outfit made from parts of a guitar. Blink-182 drummer Travis Barker makes a cameo appearance and is featured as one of the drummers in Rihanna's rock band.

== Live performances ==
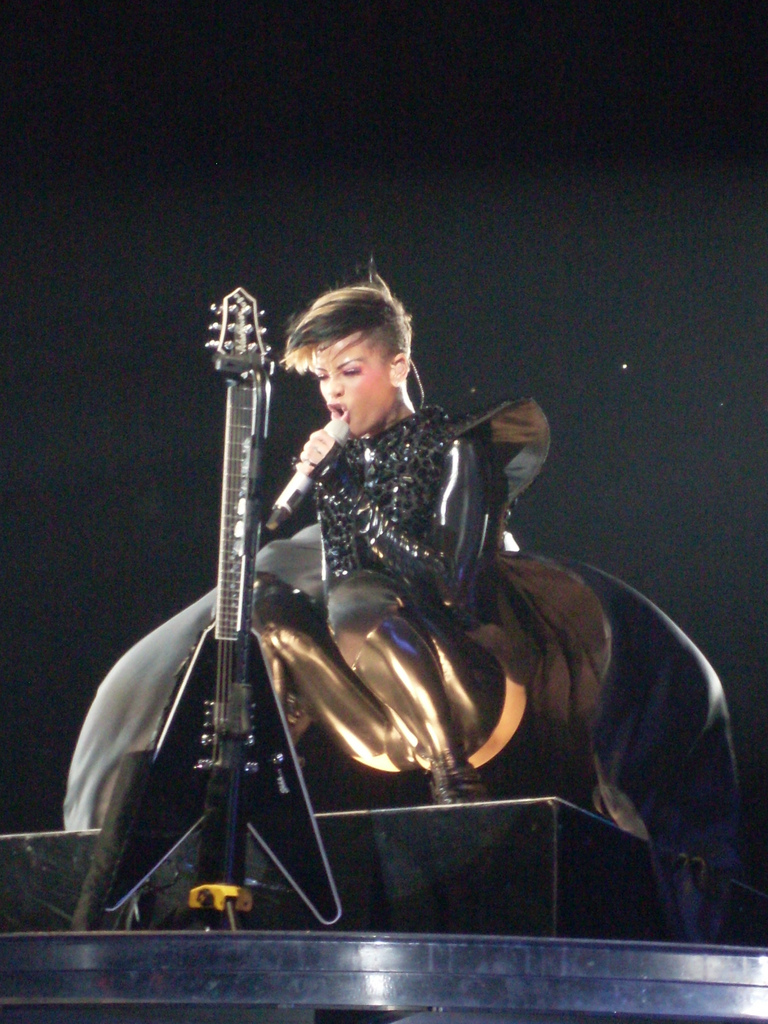
Rihanna performing "Rockstar 101" on the Last Girl on Earth (2010-11)

Rihanna first performed "Rockstar 101" on American Idol on April 7, 2010. She wore a black PVC catsuit and was accompanied on stage by guitarist Nuno Bettencourt; the set design included flame throwers and a video screen which showed guitars, lightning bolts and skulls. At one point, the singer picked and played up a black Gibson Flying V guitar. Larry Carroll for MTV wrote that the extent of Rihanna's ability to play the guitar was limited to playing it with one finger on one of the strings. However, he complimented Rihanna's overall performance, writing that her shoulder pads were "nearly as huge as her presence". He went on to write that she "half-sung, half-spoke" the song. A reviewer for MTV UK agreed with Carroll, writing that "halfway through the performance [Rihanna] donned a 'black flying v guitar' although we're not sure you could say she 'played' it!" Caryn Ganz of Rolling Stone praised Rihanna's performance, writing "if the introductory rules of rock stardom are 'teach thyself to pick slide,' 'tight clod' and 'pyro!' then Rihanna has been paying attention in her 'Rockstar 101' classes after all".

Writing for About.com, Bill Lamb was critical of Rihanna's decision to perform "Rockstar 101" on American Idol. He commented that previous media reports had indicated that the singer would be debuting a different album track, "Te Amo", which was released as the fifth single from Rated R. Lamb thought that "Rockstar 101" was one of the "weaker" songs on the album, and predicted that it would be "destined to end the streak of three consecutive top 10 pop hits from the album". While he wrote that the "intensely chilly, distant feel of the song works" within the context of Rated R, Lamb was unsure of whether or not it would appeal to the masses on radio. The song was included on the set list of the Last Girl on Earth (2010–11). Clay Cane for BET wrote that Rihanna "deserves a round of applause for doing something different, straying away from being a standard pop tart". "Rockstar 101" is also included on Rihanna's Diamonds World Tour (2013).

== Track listings ==
- Digital download (the remixes; Masterbeat.com edition)
1. "Rockstar 101" (Dave Audé Radio) – 4:18
2. "Rockstar 101" (Mark Picchiotti Pop Rock Radio) – 3:58
3. "Rockstar 101" (Mark Picchiotti Rockin Radio) – 3:57
4. "Rockstar 101" (Loose Cannons Black Guitar R-Licks Radio) – 3:46
5. "Rockstar 101" (Chew Fu Teachers Pet Fix Extended) – 4:28
6. "Rockstar 101" (Dave Audé Club) – 7:52
7. "Rockstar 101" (Mark Picchiotti Pop Rock Mix) – 7:37
8. "Rockstar 101" (Mark Picchiotti Rockin Club Mix) – 7:51
9. "Rockstar 101" (Loose Cannons Black Guitar R-Licks Extended) – 5:54
10. "Rockstar 101" (Dave Audé Dub) – 6:44
11. "Rockstar 101" (Mark Picchiotti Power Dub) – 7:20
- Digital download (the remixes; iTunes Store edition)
1. "Rockstar 101" (Chew Fu Teacher's Pet Fix) – 3:51
2. "Rockstar 101" (Dave Audé Radio) – 4:18
3. "Rockstar 101" (Mark Picchiotti Pop Rock Radio) – 3:58
4. "Rockstar 101" (Mark Picchiotti Rockin Radio) – 3:57
5. "Rockstar 101" (Loose Cannons Black Guitar R-Licks Radio) – 3:46
6. "Rockstar 101" (Chew Fu Teachers Pet Fix Extended) – 4:28
7. "Rockstar 101" (Dave Audé Club) – 7:52
8. "Rockstar 101" (Mark Picchiotti Pop Rock Mix) – 7:37
9. "Rockstar 101" (Mark Picchiotti Rockin Club Mix) – 7:51
10. "Rockstar 101" (Loose Cannons Black Guitar R-Licks Extended) – 5:54
11. "Rockstar 101" (Dave Audé Dub) – 6:44
12. "Rockstar 101" (Mark Picchiotti Power Dub) – 7:20
- Digital download (the remixes; Amazon edition)
1. "Rockstar 101" (Chew Fu Teacher's Pet Fix Single Version) [Explicit] – 3:52
2. "Rockstar 101" (Chew Fu Teacher's Pet Fix Single Version) – 3:51
3. "Rockstar 101" (Dave Audé Radio) – 4:18
4. "Rockstar 101" (Mark Picchiotti Pop Rock Radio) – 3:58
5. "Rockstar 101" (Mark Picchiotti Rockin Radio) – 3:57
6. "Rockstar 101" (Loose Cannons Black Guitar R-Licks Radio) – 3:46
7. "Rockstar 101" (Chew Fu Teachers Pet Fix) [Explicit] – 4:28
8. "Rockstar 101" (Chew Fu Teachers Pet Fix) – 4:28
9. "Rockstar 101" (Dave Audé Club) [Explicit] – 7:52
10. "Rockstar 101" (Mark Picchiotti Pop Rock Mix) – 7:37
11. "Rockstar 101" (Mark Picchiotti Rockin Club Mix) – 7:51
12. "Rockstar 101" (Loose Cannons Black Guitar R-Licks Extended) – 5:54
13. "Rockstar 101" (Dave Audé Dub) – 6:44
14. "Rockstar 101" (Mark Picchiotti Power Dub) – 7:20

== Credits and personnel ==
Credits are adapted from the inlay cover of Rated R.

Recording

- Recorded at Serenity Sound Studios, Los Angeles, CA; The Boom Boom Room, Burbank CA; Triangle Sound Studios, Atlanta, GA
- Mixed at Larrabee Studios, Universal City, CA

Personnel

- Songwriting – Terius Nash, Christopher Stewart, Robyn Fenty
- Production – Christopher "Tricky Stewart, Terius "The-Dream" Nash
- Vocal production – Makeba Riddick
- Engineering – Marcus Tovar, Brian "B-LUV" Thomas, Andrew Wuepper, Chris "TEK" O'Ryan
- Additional engineering – Pat Thrall
- Assistant engineering – Luis Navarro, AJ Clark, Jason Sherwood, Steven Dennis
- Mixing – Jaycen Joshua
- Assistant mixing – Giancarlo Lino
- Guitar – Tim Stewart
- Additional keys – Monte Neuble

== Charts ==
=== Weekly charts ===
Weekly chart performance
Chart (2010)	Peak position
Australia (ARIA)	24
US Billboard Hot 100	64
US Dance Club Songs (Billboard)	2
US R&B/Hip-Hop Digital Songs (Billboard)	10

=== Year-end charts ===
Year-end chart performance
Chart (2010)	Position
US Dance Club Songs (Billboard)	16

== Certifications ==
Certifications
Region	Certification	Certified units/sales
Australia (ARIA)	Gold	35,000^{‡}
United States (RIAA)	Platinum	1,000,000^{‡}
^{‡} Sales+streaming figures based on certification alone.

== Release history ==
Release dates and formats
Region	Date	Format(s)	Version	Label	Ref.
United States	May 18, 2010	Contemporary hit radio; rhythmic contemporary radio	Original	Def Jam	
United States	June 2, 2010	Digital download	The remixes (Masterbeat.com edition)	Def Jam	
United States	July 13, 2010	Digital download	The remixes (iTunes Store edition)	Def Jam	
Australia	July 19, 2010	Contemporary hit radio	Original	Def Jam	
United Kingdom	June 29, 2012	Digital download	The remixes (Amazon edition)	Mercury	
