= List of Rihanna live performances =

Rihanna live performances
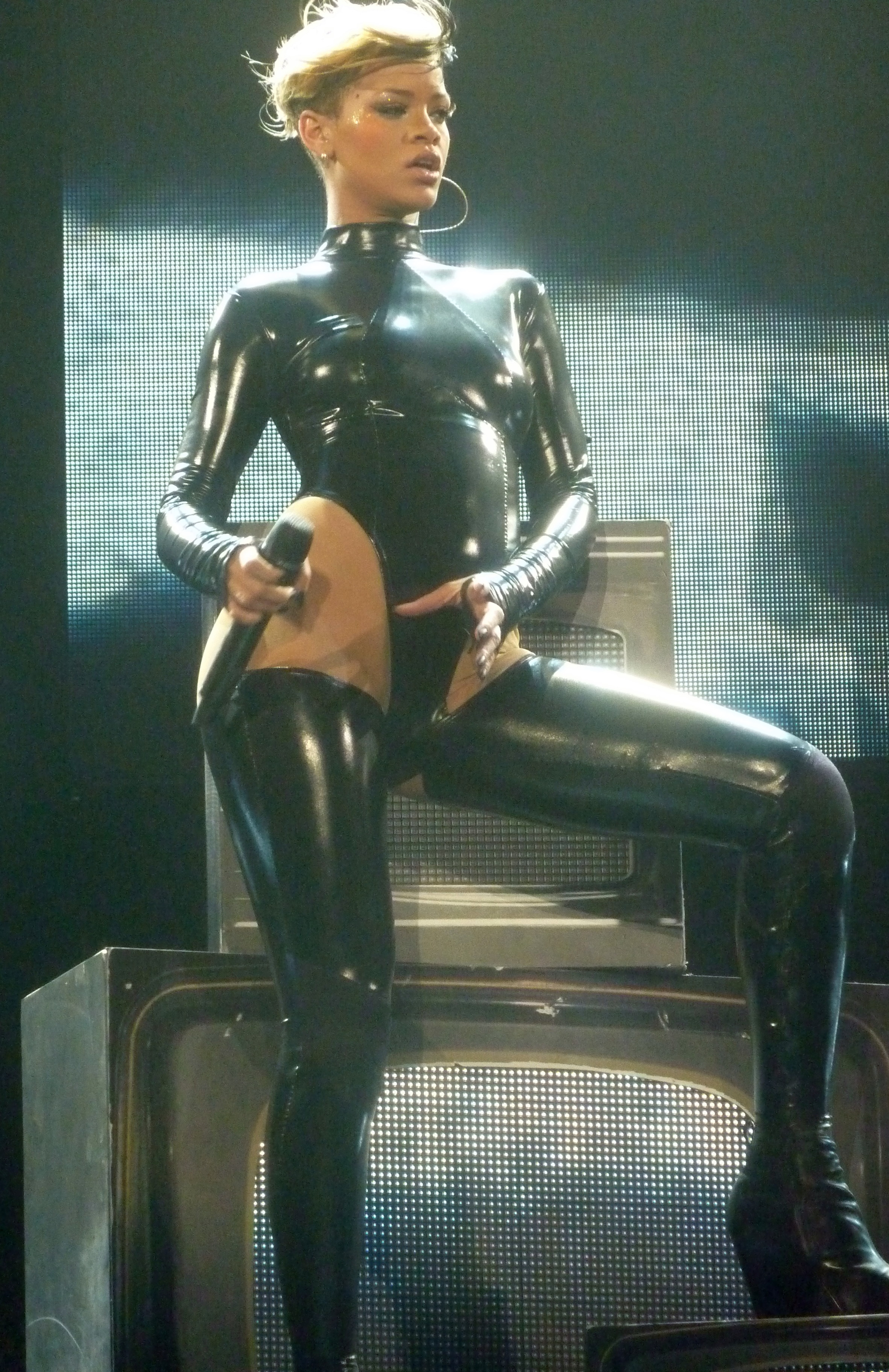
- Rihanna performing during the Last Girl on Earth Tour in Paris in 2010
- Concert tours: 6
- Co-headlining concert tours: 1
- Promotional tours: 3
- Featured act: 3
- Live performances: 46

Barbadian singer Rihanna has embarked on twelve concert tours, five of which have been worldwide. Her first tour, Rihanna: Live in Concert Tour (2006) solely focused on North America, as it was her initial debuting market; the tour supported her first and second studio albums, Music of the Sun (2005) and A Girl like Me (2006). The tour lasted for three months, through which Rihanna performed 36 shows. The same year, Rihanna continued to tour as a special guest on the PCD World Tour with the Pussycat Dolls, the Roc the Block Tour with Jay-Z and Ne-Yo, and the Monkey Business Tour with The Black Eyed Peas. In the year 2007, through 2009, she performed on the worldwide Good Girl Gone Bad Tour, in-support of her third studio album of the same name. During the tour, Rihanna visited Europe, North America, Oceania, Asia and Africa. It featured Rihanna presenting completely different styles than previously, such as wearing numerous leather outfits. The Good Girl Gone Bad Tour sparked controversy in Malaysia where the Pan-Malaysian Islamic Party recommended that Rihanna's concert tour should be banned due her provocative outfits. A DVD, titled Good Girl Gone Bad Live was released on June 16, 2008. It features the show from Evening News Arena in Manchester, England, held on December 6, 2007.

In 2010 and 2011, Rihanna embarked on her second worldwide Last Girl on Earth Tour to further promote her fourth studio album Rated R (2009). During the tour, Rihanna performed 67 shows and visited Europe, North America, Asia and Australia. Simon Henwood was a creative director of the tour with its theme being Rihanna's dreams and nightmares featuring her as the last human alive. During the tour, Extreme's guitarist, Nuno Bettencourt, joined Rihanna's band. Last Girl on Earth Tour featured several opening acts, including American singers Kesha and Travie McCoy for the North American leg of the tour, Pixie Lott for the UK shows, while Scottish DJ Calvin Harris opened the shows from the Australian leg. The tour received predominantly positive reviews from critics, with Daily Telegraph's Neil McCormick praising its costumes, dance-routines and screens.

In late 2010, Rihanna released her fifth studio album, Loud. To further promote its material, Rihanna embarked on her fourth concert tour, the Loud Tour, in June 2011, having announced it on February 9, 2011. The tour comprised 98 show dates, 33 in North America, 4 in South America and 61 in Europe. The concert's stage featured separate sections where the audience had the chance to be in the show. Originally, J. Cole and Cee Lo Green were planned as support acts for the North American leg. However, Green left the tour citing schedule conflicts. Calvin Harris was featured as an opening act on the European leg of the tour. The tour was received positively by critics, who praised Rihanna's vocals and dance-moves. It featured Rihanna giving a lap dance to fan that she chose from the audience, during the performance of "Skin". According to Pollstar the tour grossed $90 million worldwide and became the 7th highest-grossing tour of 2011. In 2008, Rihanna also performed a series of charity concerts titled A Girl's Night Out, to benefit the "Believe Foundation". Rihanna's fifth concert tour, Diamonds World Tour was in support of her seventh studio album Unapologetic and became Rihanna's highest-grossing tour, surpassing her Loud tour in 2011. It comprised 96 show dates and visited North America, Africa, Europe and Oceania. Rihanna also embarked on a co-headlining mini-tour with Eminem in 2014. Rihanna's most recent concert-tour supported by Travis Scott- Anti World Tour was held throughout 2016 in support of her eighth studio album Anti.

== Concert tours ==
| Year | Title | Duration | Number of performances | Gross |
|---|---|---|---|---|
| 2006 | Rihanna: Live in Concert Tour | July 1, 2006 – September 30, 2006 (North America) | 27 | / |
The Rihanna: Live in Concert Tour was Rihanna's debut tour. It promoted her first two albums, Music of the Sun and A Girl like Me. The tour visited only North America, with Rihanna performing 32 shows through it.
| 2007–2009 | Good Girl Gone Bad Tour | September 15, 2007 – January 24, 2009 (North America, Europe, Asia, Africa, Oceania) | 80 | / |
The Good Girl Gone Bad Tour was first Rihanna's worldwide tour, reaching North America, Europe, Asia, Africa and Oceania. The tour supported Rihanna's third studio album Good Girl Gone Bad. During the tour, Rihanna presented different image and style, while revealing leather outfits. American artists Akon and Ciara were featured as one of the opening acts on the tour. In Malaysia, the Good Girl Gone Bad Tour sparked controversy when the Pan-Malaysian Islamic Party recommended that Rihanna's show from the tour should be banned in the country, citing her provocative outfits as the main reason. Overall, critics gave the tour mixed reviews. A DVD, titled Good Girl Gone Bad Live was released on June 16, 2008, and features the show from Evening News Arena in Manchester, England, held on December 6, 2007.
| 2010–2011 | Last Girl on Earth | April 16, 2010 – March 12, 2011 (Europe, North America, Australia) | 65 | $40 million |
Her third tour began on April 16, 2010, in Antwerp, Belgium, in support of her fourth studio album Rated R. On the Australian leg of this tour, she performed three songs from her subsequent album, Loud. The tour grossed approximately $40 million worldwide and received generally positive reviews from critics.
| 2011 | Loud Tour | June 4, 2011 – December 22, 2011 (North America, Europe, South America) | 98 | $90 million |
She embarked on her fourth tour in Baltimore, USA, in support of her fifth studio album Loud. Rappers Drake, Kanye West and Jay-Z made guest appearances on some dates to perform their collaborations "What's My Name?", "Run This Town", "All of the Lights" and "Umbrella", respectively. Rihanna broke a record by playing 10 shows at the O_{2} Arena during the European leg of the tour. It became the seventh highest-grossing tour of 2011 and critics acclaimed the show for its liveliness and higher caliber of quality compared to her previous tours. A DVD, titled Loud Tour Live at the O2 was released on December 13, 2012, and features the shows from the O_{2} Arena in London held between December 20 and December 22, 2011.
| 2013 | Diamonds World Tour | March 8, 2013 – November 15, 2013 (North America, Africa, Europe, Oceania, Asia) | 96 | $141.9 million |
The Diamonds World Tour was launched in support of her seventh studio album Unapologetic, kicking off in Buffalo, New York and concluding in New Orleans, USA. Rihanna broke numerous records during the tour including becoming the youngest artist ever to headline a show at the Stade de France, perform at the Millennium Stadium and twice at the Twickenham Stadium and being the youngest artist to sell out these stadiums. She also broke a record of having one of the largest concert audiences in history, performing in front of 100,000 people during Formula 1 Singapore Grand Prix Night Race, giving her the largest audience at the event ever compared to previous acts like Shakira, Mariah Carey, Beyoncé, Maroon 5, Katy Perry, The Killers and Justin Bieber. The tour featured support acts including David Guetta, Haim and ASAP Rocky among others. It was the fifth highest-grossing tour of 2013 and was met with positive reviews from critics.
| 2016 | Anti World Tour | March 12, 2016 – November 27, 2016 (North America, Europe) | 71 | $106 million |

== Co-headlining concert tours ==
| Year | Title | Co-headliner | Duration | Number of performances | Gross |
|---|---|---|---|---|---|
| 2014 | The Monster Tour | Eminem | August 7, 2014 – August 23, 2014 (North America) | 6 | $36 million |
The Monster Tour is the co-headlining mini-tour by Eminem and Rihanna. The tour began on August 7, 2014, in Pasadena, California and finished on August 23, 2014, in Detroit, US.

== Promotional tours ==
| Year | Title | Promoting album | Set list |
|---|---|---|---|
| 2005 | Rihanna's Secret Body Spray Tour | Music of the Sun | "My Name Is Rihanna", "If It's Lovin' that You Want", "You Don't Love Me (No, No, No)", "The Last Time", "Let Me", "Pon de Replay" |
| 2008 | A Girl's Night Out | Good Girl Gone Bad | "Pon de Replay", "Let Me", "Rehab", "SOS", "Good Girl Gone Bad", "Hate That I Love You", "Unfaithful", "Don't Stop the Music", "Shut Up and Drive", "Umbrella" |
| 2012 | 777 Tour | Unapologetic | "Cockiness (Love It)", "Birthday Cake", "Talk That Talk", "Wait Your Turn", "Man Down", "Only Girl (In the World)", "Don't Stop the Music", "S&M", "Phresh Out the Runway", "Unfaithful", "Take a Bow", "Hate That I Love You", "Where Have You Been", "Run This Town", "Live Your Life", "All of the Lights", "Stay", "Diamonds", "Umbrella", "We Found Love" |

== Featured act ==
| Year | Title | Promoting album | Set list |
|---|---|---|---|
| 2006 | Roc tha Block | A Girl like Me | N/A |
| 2006 | PCD World Tour | A Girl like Me | "Pon de Replay", "If It's Lovin' That You Want", "You Don't Love Me (No, No, No)", "We Ride", "Break It Off", "Unfaithful", "Let Me", "Kisses Don't Lie", "P.S. (I'm Still Not Over You)", "Redemption Song" (Bob Marley cover), "SOS" |
| 2008 | Glow in the Dark Tour | Good Girl Gone Bad | "Disturbia", "Breakin' Dishes", "Rehab", "Break It Off", "Pon de Replay", "Who Am I", "Paper Planes", "Doo Wop (That Thing)", "SOS", "Hate That I Love You", "Take a Bow", "Unfaithful", "Don't Stop the Music", "Shut Up and Drive", "Umbrella" |

== Live televised performances ==
| Event | Date | City | Performed song(s) |
|---|---|---|---|
| 2005 MTV Video Music Awards | August 28, 2005 | Miami | "Pon De Replay" |
| 2006 Much Music Video Awards | June 18, 2006 | Canada | "SOS" |
| 2006 Teen Choice | August 20, 2006 | California | "SOS" |
| 2006 MOBO Awards | September 20, 2006 | London | "Unfaithful" |
| 2006 MTV Europe Music Awards | November 2, 2006 | Copenhagen | "SOS" |
| 2006 World Music Awards | November 15, 2006 | London | "Unfaithful" |
| 2006 Nobel Peace Prize Concert | December 11, 2006 | Oslo | "SOS" "Unfaithful" |
| 2007 MTV Movie Awards | June 3, 2007 | Universal City | "Umbrella" |
| 2007 MTV Video Music Awards | September 9, 2007 | Las Vegas | "Shut Up and Drive" (with Fall Out Boy) |
| 2007 World Music Awards | November 4, 2007 | Monte Carlo | "Umbrella" |
| 2007 American Music Awards | November 18, 2007 | Los Angeles | "Umbrella" "Hate That I Love You" (with Ne-Yo) |
| 2008 NRJ Music Awards | January 26, 2008 | Cannes | "Don't Stop the Music" |
| 50th Annual Grammy Awards | February 10, 2008 | Los Angeles | "Umbrella" "Don't Stop the Music" (with The Time) |
| 2008 BRIT Awards | February 20, 2008 | London | "Umbrella" (with Klaxons) |
| 2008 MuchMusic Video Awards | June 15, 2008 | Toronto | "Take a Bow" |
| 2008 BET Awards | June 24, 2008 | Los Angeles | "Take a Bow" |
| 2008 Fashion Rocks | September 5, 2008 | New York City | "Vogue" |
| 2008 MTV Video Music Awards | September 7, 2008 | Los Angeles | "Disturbia", "Live Your Life" (with T.I.) |
| 2008 American Music Awards | November 23, 2008 | Los Angeles | "Rehab" |
| 2009 American Music Awards | November 22, 2009 | Los Angeles | "Hard" "Wait Your Turn" |
| 2010 NRJ Music Awards | January 23, 2010 | Cannes | "Russian Roulette" |
| 2010 Echo Awards | March 4, 2010 | Berlin | "Rude Boy" |
| 2010 Nickelodeon Kids' Choice Awards | March 27, 2010 | Westwood | "Hard" "Rude Boy" "Don't Stop the Music" |
| 2010 MTV Video Music Awards | September 12, 2010 | Los Angeles | "Love the Way You Lie" (with Eminem) |
| 2010 MTV Europe Music Awards | November 7, 2010 | Madrid | "Only Girl (In the World)" |
| 2010 American Music Awards | November 21, 2010 | Los Angeles | "Love the Way You Lie (Part II)" "What's My Name?" "Only Girl (In the World)" |
| 53rd Annual Grammy Awards | February 13, 2011 | Los Angeles | "Love the Way You Lie (Part II)" (with Eminem) "What's My Name?" (with Drake) |
| 2011 Brit Awards | February 15, 2011 | London | "Only Girl (In the World)" "S&M" "What's My Name?" |
| NBA All Star Game | February 20, 2011 | Los Angeles | "Umbrella" "Only Girl (In the World)" "Rude Boy" "All of the Lights" (with Kanye West) "What's My Name?" (with Drake) |
| 2011 Academy of Country Music Awards | April 3, 2011 | Las Vegas | "California King Bed" (with Jennifer Nettles) |
| 2011 Billboard Music Awards | May 22, 2011 | Las Vegas | "S&M" remix (with Britney Spears) |
| 54th Annual Grammy Awards | February 12, 2012 | Los Angeles | "We Found Love" "Princess of China" (with Coldplay) |
| 2012 BRIT Awards | February 21, 2012 | London | "We Found Love" |
| 2012 MTV Video Music Awards | September 6, 2012 | Los Angeles | "Cockiness (Love It)" remix (with ASAP Rocky) "We Found Love" (with Calvin Harris) |
| 2012 Summer Paralympics closing ceremony | September 9, 2012 | London | "Princess of China" (with Coldplay) "We Found Love" "Run This Town" (with Coldplay and Jay-Z) |
| Victoria's Secret Fashion Show | November 7, 2012 | New York City | "Diamonds" "Phresh Out the Runway" |
| 55th Annual Grammy Awards | February 10, 2013 | Los Angeles | "Stay" (with Mikky Ekko) |
| 2013 American Music Awards | November 24, 2013 | Los Angeles | "Diamonds" |
| 2014 MTV Movie Awards | April 13, 2014 | Los Angeles | "The Monster" (with Eminem) |
| The Concert for Valor | November 11, 2014 | Washington, D.C. | "Diamonds" "Stay" "The Monster" (with Eminem) |
| 57th Annual Grammy Awards | February 8, 2015 | Los Angeles | "FourFiveSeconds" (with Kanye West, Paul McCartney) |
| 2015 iHeartRadio Music Awards | March 29, 2015 | Los Angeles | "Bitch Better Have My Money" |
| 2016 BRIT Awards | February 24, 2016 | London | "Consideration" (with SZA) "Work" (with Drake) |
| 2016 Billboard Music Awards | May 22, 2016 | Las Vegas | "Love on the Brain" |
| 2016 MTV Video Music Awards | August 28, 2016 | New York City | "Don't Stop the Music", "Only Girl (In the World)", "We Found Love", "Where Have You Been" "Rude Boy", "What's My Name", "Work" "Needed Me", "Pour It Up", "Bitch Better Have My Money" "Stay", "Diamonds", "Love on the Brain" |
| 60th Annual Grammy Awards | January 28, 2018 | New York City | "Wild Thoughts" (with DJ Khaled and Bryson Tiller) |
| Super Bowl LVII halftime show | February 12, 2023 | Glendale, Arizona, U.S | "Bitch Better Have My Money" "Where Have You Been" "Only Girl (In the World)" "We Found Love" "Rude Boy" "Work" "Wild Thoughts" "Pour It Up" "All of the Lights" "Run This Town" "Umbrella" "Diamonds" |
| 95th Academy Awards | March 12, 2023 | Los Angeles | "Lift Me Up" |
| Jay-Z 30 Tour | July 12, 2026 | New York | "Run This Town" "Bitch Better Have My Money" |
