= A Girl's Night Out =

2008 series of charity concerts by Rihanna

- Promotional concert by Rihanna
- Promotional poster for Rihanna's charity concerts
- Location: Chicago; San Francisco; New York City
- Venue: Vision Night Club (Chicago); Ruby Skye (San Francisco); The Highline Ballroom (New York City)
- Start date: March 26, 2008
- End date: April 9, 2008

Rihanna concert chronology
- Good Girl Gone Bad Tour (2007–2009); A Girl's Night Out (2008); Last Girl on Earth (2010–11)

A Girl's Night Out was a series of charity concerts by Barbadian singer Rihanna to benefit the "Believe Foundation". The concerts were made free for the public. Money from sponsors and advertisers were to be donated to provide medical supplies, school supplies and toys to children in need.

== Set list ==
1. "Pon de Replay"
2. "Let Me"
3. "Rehab"
4. "SOS"
5. "Good Girl Gone Bad"
6. "Hate That I Love You"
7. "Unfaithful"
8. "Don't Stop The Music"
9. "Shut Up and Drive"
10. "Umbrella"

== Tour dates ==
Date	City	Country	Venue	Charity
March 26, 2008	Chicago	United States	Vision Night Club	Bear Necessities Pediatric Cancer Foundation
March 28, 2008	San Francisco	United States	Ruby Skye	The Children’s Charity
April 9, 2008	New York City	United States	The Highline Ballroom	DKMS Americas
