= Stage Door Theater =

Stage Door Theater may refer to:

- a former name for the building now housing the nightclub Ruby Skye
- a theatre in the North Carolina Blumenthal Performing Arts Center
