= Unfaithful (song) =

2006 song by Rihanna

Single by Rihanna

from the album A Girl like Me
- Released: May 2, 2006
- Recorded: 2005–2006
- Studio: Avatar, Battery (New York City); Loft (Bronxville); Digital Insight (Las Vegas)
- Genre: Pop; dancehall; R&B
- Length: 3:49
- Label: Def Jam; SRP
- Songwriters: Shaffer Smith; Mikkel S. Eriksen; Tor Erik Hermansen
- Producer: Stargate

Rihanna singles chronology
"SOS" (2006)	"Unfaithful" (2006)	"We Ride" (2006)

Music video
- "Unfaithful" on YouTube

"Unfaithful" is a song by the Barbadian singer Rihanna from her second album A Girl like Me (2006). It was written by Shaffer "Ne-Yo" Smith with the song's producers Stargate. The song was released by Def Jam Recordings on May 2, 2006, as the second single from the album. "Unfaithful" is a pop, dancehall and R&B ballad and was inspired by the music of American rock band Evanescence. Originally titled "Murderer", the single speaks about a woman who regrets cheating on her partner.

"Unfaithful" received mixed to positive reviews from critics; many praised its powerful balladry, but some criticized the lyrics. The song reached number one in Canada and Switzerland and the top ten on the singles charts in 19 additional countries, including the UK Singles Chart, on which it became Rihanna's third top-ten single. "Unfaithful" peaked at number six on the US Billboard Hot 100 chart. It was certified quadruple platinum by the Recording Industry Association of America (RIAA), denoting shipments of over four million copies.

The song's accompanying music video was directed by Anthony Mandler and premiered in May 2006. It features Rihanna in a love triangle in which she struggles to choose between her romantic interest and her lover, and regrets having cheated on the former. Since its release, "Unfaithful" has become a staple of Rihanna's live performances. In 2006, she performed it on award ceremonies such as the MOBO Awards and the World Music Awards. The song was on the set list of three of her major tours, Good Girl Gone Bad (2007–09), the Last Girl on Earth Tour (2010–11) and the Loud Tour (2011).

== Development and release ==
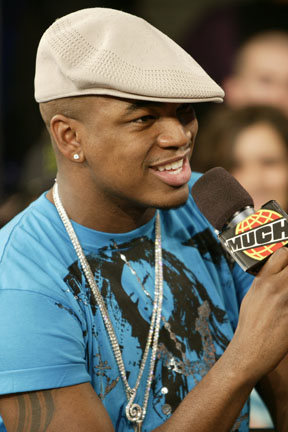
Ne-Yo co-wrote "Unfaithful" with Stargate who produced it

After moving to the US, Rihanna signed a contract with Def Jam Recordings, and released her debut album Music of the Sun (2005). The album was inspired by Caribbean music, including soca, dancehall, and reggae, and incorporates dance-pop and R&B. In an interview for MTV, Rihanna said that when she had arrived in the US, she had been exposed to different types of music that she had never heard before, including rock music, which she incorporated into her second studio album, A Girl like Me (2006).

While recording her debut studio album in 2005, Rihanna met Ne-Yo for the first time, but they could not collaborate on the album. She wanted to work with him since she heard "Let Me Love You" (2004) by Mario, which Ne-Yo wrote. When the production for A Girl like Me started, she considered working with him. She said, "So for the second album, I was like, 'You know what? I have to work with that guy Ne-Yo.' So we went into the studio and we started working on this song." Ne-Yo and Norwegian production duo Mikkel S. Eriksen and Tor Erik Hermansen collectively known as Stargate wrote "Unfaithful", which Rihanna explained was "new ground for [her]" because it was a ballad. It was produced by StarGate while Debbie Mounsey served as a production assistant. "Unfaithful" was recorded by Eriksen, Al Hemberger, Malcolm Pollack and Tiger Stylz at Battery and Avatar Studios in New York City, Loft Recording Studios in Bronxville and Digital Insight Recording Studios in Las Vegas. It was mixed by Phil Tan and Makeba Riddick provided the vocal production.

"Unfaithful" was released as the second single from A Girl like Me, after the number-one single "SOS". The song was released to digital outlets in Canada on June 20, 2006. A radio edit of the song was released. It is under the same time length of the album and instrumental versions. For the plays on radio stations, the radio edit has the word "gun" removed. It was also sent to urban contemporary radio stations in the United States on June 29, 2006. Seven digital remixes of "Unfaithful" were released on July 17, 2006, via iTunes in several countries including France, Germany, Italy, Spain and the US. A CD single of the song, comprising its album and instrumental version, a Tony Moran's radio mix, and its music video, was released in the United Kingdom on July 25, 2006 and in August of that year in Germany and France.

== Composition ==
"Unfaithful"
A 23-second sample of the chorus of "Unfaithful" where Rihanna sings the lines: I don’t want to hurt him anymore/I don’t want to take away his life/I don’t want to be... a murderer

"Unfaithful" is a pop, dancehall and R&B ballad that runs for three minutes and forty-six seconds. Originally, it was a dark and moody track inspired by the music of the American rock band Evanescence, with the working title of "Murderer". Hermansen and Eriksen collaborated on the melody of "Unfaithful". In the beginning, the song's structure was built around piano as the only instrument; the percussion and strings was added later. The strings on the track were arranged and conducted by Rob Mounsey.

Elaborating about the song's development in an interview for Sound on Sound Eriksen said, "I find that how natural it sounds is not so much about how realistic the string sound is, but more about your choice of notes and how you play and program the strings." According to the sheet music published by Universal Music Publishing Group at Musicnotes.com, it was composed in the key of C minor using in common time and a slow feeling groove of 72 beats per minute. Rihanna's vocal range spans from the low note of F_{3} to the high note of C_{5}.

According to Brandee J. Tecson of MTV News, "Unfaithful" is a "bittersweet ballad" that shows a new side to Rihanna. In an interview for the same publication Rihanna said about the lyrics, "I'm referred to as a murderer in that song. Meaning, I'm taking this guy's life by hurting him, cheating on him. He knows, and it makes him feel so bad." She continued, "We always put it out there that guys cheat, and finally someone put it in perspective: girls cheat too." In another interview for Newsday, she said that "Unfaithful" was "birthed out of a relationship she outgrew when she was fourteen". She added that the nature of the relationship was not physical.

== Reception ==
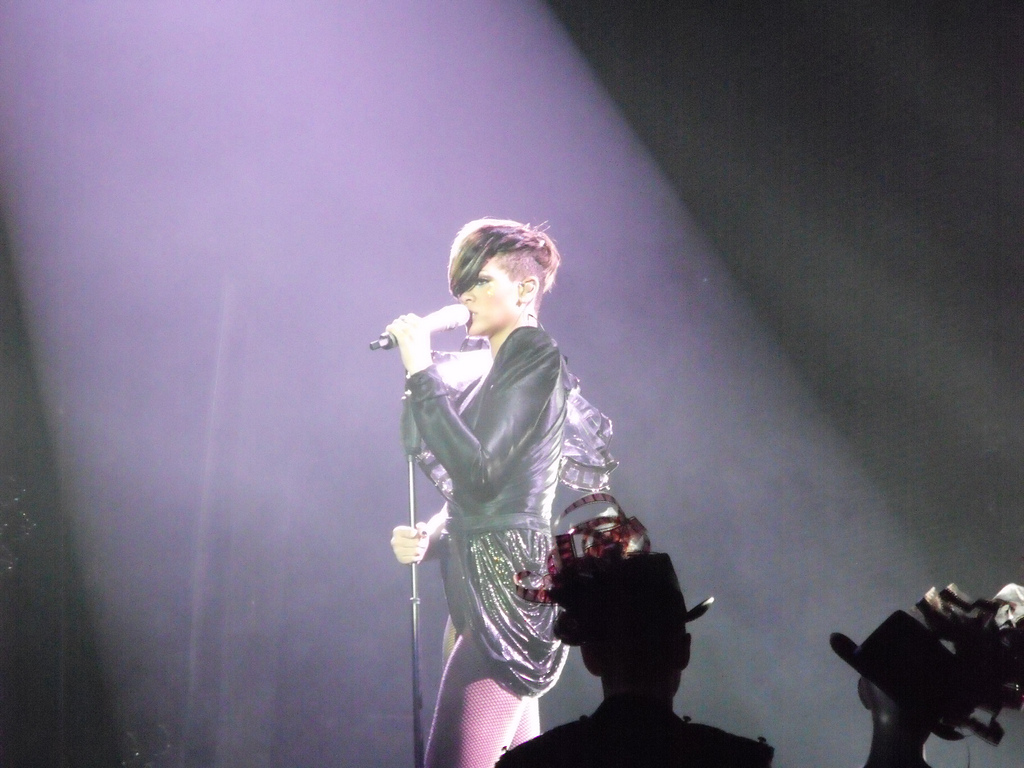
Rihanna performing "Unfaithful" on her Last Girl on Earth Tour

"Unfaithful" received mixed to positive reviews from most music critics. Kelefa Sanneh from The New York Times described "Unfaithful" as "a profoundly ludicrous – but not disagreeable – pop lament". Quentin B. Huff from PopMatters commented that, "'Unfaithful' is a well-intentioned ballad informed by dramatic piano and strings". Slant Magazine's Sal Cinquemani stated, "The melodramatic, string-laden ballad 'Unfaithful' is, if nothing else, an ambitious second single for an artist like Rihanna, and with lyrics like 'I don't want to be a murderer/Our love, his trust/I might as well take a gun and put it to his head,' it earns bonus points just for being so fucking weird".

Steve Jones of USA Today wrote that while the other ballads on the album were not as strong, "'Unfaithful', in which [Rihanna] deals with the consequences of her own cheating heart, shows depth". Celia San Miguel from Vibe praised "Unfaithful", stating that it gives Rihanna a "new found charisma, solid vocal range and her ability to channel deep-rooted emotions with ease". Dan Charnas from The Washington Post described the single as "an honest account of dishonesty". A reviewer from Billboard magazine likened "Unfaithful" to Beyoncé's music and concluded that the song reveals Rihanna as a "young vocalist growing into her own". Quentin B. Huff of PopMatters criticized the song's lyrics and described them as well-intentioned but "overboard with melodrama" and "devoid of remorse".

"Unfaithful" was listed at number eight on Billboard magazine's list of Songs of the Summer of 2006. In 2011, the same publication also ranked the song at number 15 on its list of Rihanna's 20 Biggest Billboard Hits. American magazine Rap-Up listed "Unfaithful" at number nine on its list of the Top 10 Singles of 2006.

== Chart performance ==
"Unfaithful" debuted at number 51 on the US Billboard Hot 100 chart on May 13, 2006. The same week, Rihanna's previous single "SOS" reached number one. "Unfaithful" peaked at number 6 on July 22, 2006, after 10 weeks on the chart, and became Rihanna's third top ten single in the US. On July 29, 2006, "Unfaithful" also topped the US Hot Dance Club Songs chart, becoming her third number one there. The song was certified platinum by the Recording Industry Association of America (RIAA) on July 27, 2006, after more than one million downloads were shipped. "Unfaithful" was more successful in Canada where it reached number one on the Canadian Singles Chart. In Australia, the song entered the chart at number two, where it peaked, on July 30, 2006. It was later certified gold by the Australian Recording Industry Association (ARIA), denoting shipments of 35,000 copies. The same week, "Unfaithful" entered the New Zealand singles chart at number five. The next week, it peaked at number four where it stayed for three consecutive weeks.

In Europe, "Unfaithful" reached the top ten in 14 countries. The song was most successful in Hungary and Switzerland where it reached number one on both nation's singles charts, and became Rihanna's first single to reach number one on both charts. "Unfaithful" was certified gold by the International Federation of the Phonographic Industry (IFPI) – Switzerland for shipping over 15,000 paid downloads in the country. In Norway, the song entered the national singles chart at number 18 and after six weeks it peaked at number two, where it stayed for two weeks. "Unfaithful" entered the Austrian singles chart at number eight on August 18, 2006, peaked at number two and stayed on the chart for 27 weeks. The single reached number two in Germany and the Republic of Ireland, number three in Denmark, Belgium (Flanders) and the Czech Republic, number five in Slovakia, number six in Sweden, number seven in France and number nine in Netherlands. On the UK Singles Chart, the song debuted at number 16 on July 22, 2006, and the next week, it peaked at number two. "Unfaithful" re-entered the chart in both 2010 and 2011, when it reached numbers 31 and 50 respectively. More than 315,000 copies of the song have been sold in the UK.

== Music video ==
The accompanying music video for "Unfaithful" was directed by Anthony Mandler on March 1-2, 2006. After their work on "Unfaithful", Mandler became Rihanna's regular collaborator, and worked on most of Rihanna's videos, including "Disturbia" (2008) and "Russian Roulette" (2009). The video premiered May 1, 2006 on MTV, and was later released on iTunes for digital download.

As the video begins, Rihanna is walking towards a dressing room mirror while preparing for a show. This is intercut with scenes of Rihanna with her boyfriend in a restaurant. While they talk to each other, Rihanna's boyfriend leaves the table and is absent for some time, during which Rihanna watches the other tables. One diner writes a note and gives it to a waiter, who passes it to Rihanna, who reads and quickly hides the note as her boyfriend returns to the table. Rihanna starts to sing the song's lyrics while she leaves the dressing room and approaches the stage, where she continues singing while a man plays a piano on the stage. The arena is empty and it appears as though Rihanna is rehearsing.

Other scenes show Rihanna dancing around the piano while the pianist is still playing. While her boyfriend is sleeping, Rihanna sends a text message to her lover, "B down in 5". She walks down the street and gets into a car with her lover, who is the note-writing diner from the restaurant and the man who plays the piano at the rehearsal. As the song continues, Rihanna is shown regretfully embracing her lover near the piano. When the rehearsal finishes, she leaves the arena, where her boyfriend is waiting for her with his car. Rihanna hugs him and tears fall from her eyes. A reviewer from MTV Australia wrote about the video's theme and appearance, "Cheaters always get busted. And this time around, Rihanna sings about being the one doing the two-timing. Secret notes, sneaking around, hearts broken... Oh, the drama. And she looks gooooood."

== Live performances ==
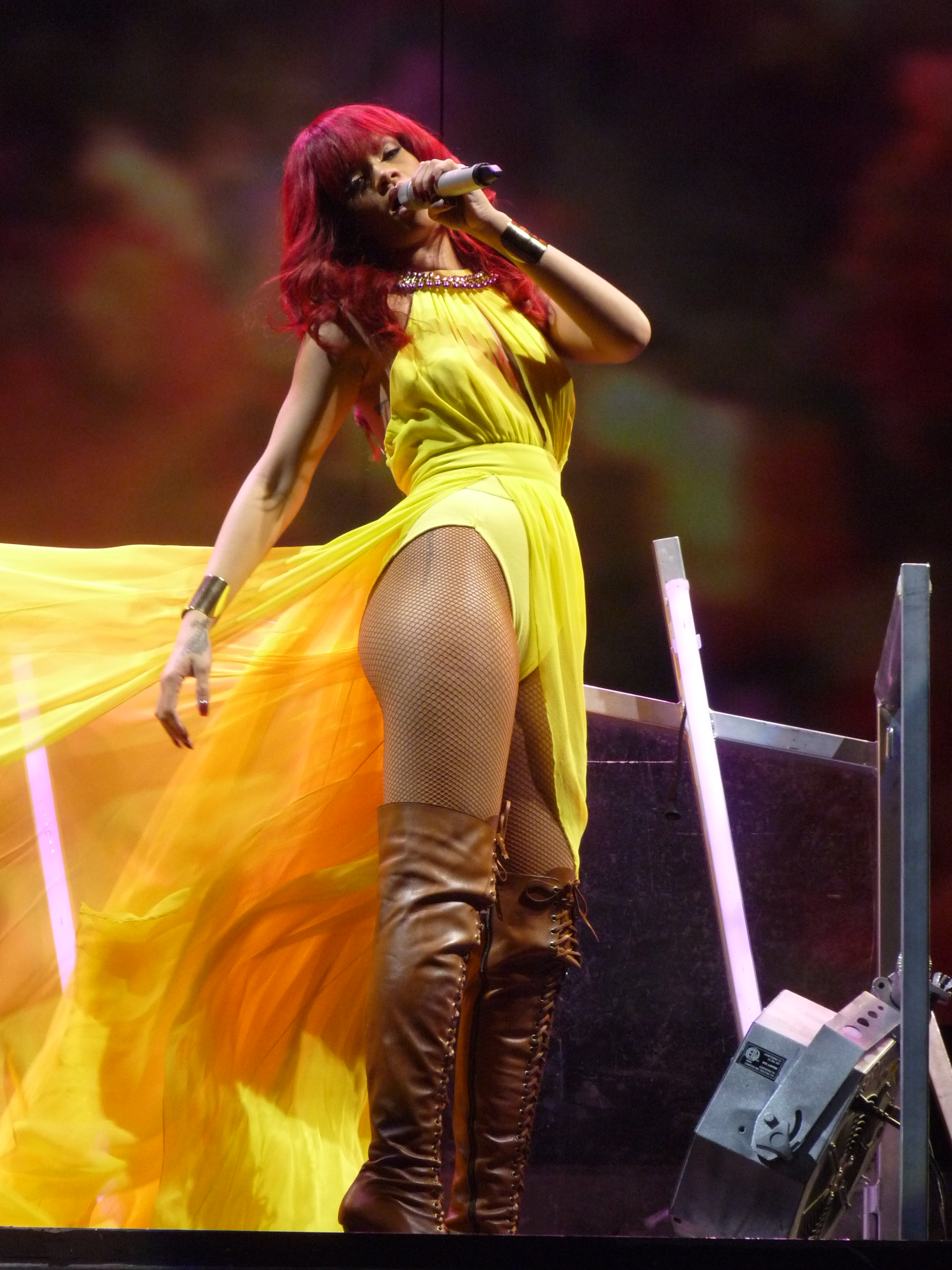
Rihanna performing "Unfaithful" on the Loud Tour (2011) in Sunrise, Florida

Since its release, "Unfaithful" has been a staple of Rihanna's performances. On July 27, 2006, she performed the song on the former MTV series, Total Request Live. Rihanna opened the 2006 MOBO Awards on September 20, 2006 at the Royal Albert Hall in London with a performance of "Unfaithful". On November 15, 2006, Rihanna performed the song at the 2006 World Music Awards, which also took place in London.

"Unfaithful" was the twelfth song on the set list of Rihanna's Good Girl Gone Bad Tour (2007–09), her first major world tour. Her performance in Manchester was released in the UK through iTunes and is featured on the Good Girl Gone Bad Live DVD. Rihanna was opening act on some dates on Kanye West's Glow in the Dark Tour (2008–09). Her set list featured "Unfaithful" and other songs from her 2007 release Good Girl Gone Bad including "Don't Stop the Music", "Shut Up and Drive" and "Umbrella". Following the release of her fourth studio album, Rated R (2009), in the UK, Rihanna performed a Nokia promotional concert at the Brixton Academy in London. She performed songs from the new release including "Russian Roulette", "Wait Your Turn" and "Hard", the latter of which Rihanna performed with Young Jeezy. Rihanna performed "Unfaithful", and songs from her older releases, including "Disturbia", "Don't Stop the Music" and "Take a Bow", during this set.

In 2010, to further promote Rated R, Rihanna embarked upon her second worldwide tour, Last Girl on Earth Tour (2010–11). "Unfaithful", which she performed while standing on a stage set with red baroque style curtains in the background, was the thirteenth song on the set list. On December 11, 2010, Rihanna was invited to appear on series seven of the UK version of The X Factor to perform her new single "What's My Name?. She also performed "Unfaithful" with finalist Matt Cardle, who later won the series. In June 2011, Rihanna embarked upon the Loud Tour, her third major worldwide tour. "Unfaithful" was the fourteenth song on the tour's set list. Rihanna performed the song on a levitating stage while wearing a long yellow dress and with a fan blowing her skirt up, which Jon Bream of Minneapolis' Star Tribune said looked "like Celine Dion delivering 'My Heart Will Go On' on the deck of the Titanic". The Daily Record's Jules Boyle concluded that "tracks like 'Unfaithful' and 'Hate That I Love You' were suitably epic and backed with a full rock band."

== Track listings ==
- European CD single and digital download
1. "Unfaithful" (Radio Edit) — 3:51
2. "Unfaithful" (Tony Moran Radio Mix) — 4:16
- UK CD single
1. "Unfaithful" — 3:52
2. "SOS" (Moto Blanco Remix) — 8:37
- CD maxi single
1. "Unfaithful" (Album Version) — 3:52
2. "Unfaithful" (Tony Moran Radio Mix) — 4:21
3. "Unfaithful" (Instrumental) — 3:49
4. "Unfaithful" (Video)
- 12-inch vinyl
1. "Unfaithful" (Radio Edit) — 3:52
2. "Unfaithful" (Instrumental) — 3:49
3. "Unfaithful" (Tony Moran Club Mix) — 8:48
- Digital download (Remixes)
1. "Unfaithful" (Tony Moran Radio Mix) — 4:15
2. "Unfaithful" (Hamel Radio Edit) — 3:53
3. "Unfaithful" (Maurice's Radio Edit) — 3:28
4. "Unfaithful" (Tony Moran Club Mix) — 9:08
5. "Unfaithful" (Hamel Club Mix) — 8:48
6. "Unfaithful" (Maurice's Club Mix) — 6:57
7. "Unfaithful" (AOL Music Sessions) — 3:49

== Credits and personnel ==
Credits are adapted from the liner notes of A Girl Like Me, Def Jam Recordings, SRP Records.

Recording

- Recorded at Battery Studios, New York City; Loft Recording Studios, Bronxville, New York; Avatar Studios, New York; Digital Insight Recording Studios, Las Vegas, Nevada.

Personnel

- Songwriting – Ne-Yo, Tor Erik Hermansen, Mikkel S. Eriksen
- Production – StarGate
- Recording – Mikkel Eriksen, Al Hemberger, Malcolm Pollack, Tiger Stylz
- Mixing – Phil Tan
- Vocal production – Makeba Riddick
- Production Assistant – Debbie Mounsey
- String arrangement and production – Rob Mounsey
- Violins – Ann Leathers, Richard Sortomme, Cenovia Cummings, Uri Vodovoz, Jan Mullen, Jeanne Ingram, Abe Appleman, Katherine Livolsi-Stern, Maura Gianni, Yana Giochman, Marti Sweet
- Violas – Sue Pray, Crystal Garner, Jill Jaffe, Mary Hamman
- Cellos – Richard Locker, Gene Moy, Eugene Briskin
- Bass – John Beal, Judy Sugarman

== Charts ==
=== Weekly charts ===
Weekly chart performance
Chart (2006)	Peak position
Australia (ARIA)	2
Australian Urban (ARIA)	1
Austria (Ö3 Austria Top 40)	2
Belgium (Ultratop 50 Flanders)	3
Belgium (Ultratop 50 Wallonia)	2
Canada (Nielsen SoundScan)	1
Croatia (HRT)	8
Czech Republic (Rádio – Top 100)	3
CIS Airplay (TopHit)	4
Denmark Airplay (Tracklisten)	3
European Hot 100 Singles (Billboard)	2
Finland (Suomen virallinen lista)	13
France (SNEP)	7
Germany (Official German Charts)	2
Hungary (Rádiós Top 40)	1
Hungary (Dance Top 40)	12
Hungary (Single Top 10)	10
Ireland (IRMA)	2
Italy (FIMI)	14
Netherlands (Dutch Top 40)	4
Netherlands (Single Top 100)	9
New Zealand (Recorded Music NZ)	4
Norway (VG-lista)	2
Romania (Romanian Top 100)	15
Russia Airplay (TopHit)	6
Scottish Singles Sales (Official Charts)	2
Slovakia (Rádio Top 100)	5
Sweden (Sverigetopplistan)	6
Switzerland (Schweizer Hitparade)	1
UK Singles (OCC)	2
UK Hip Hop/R&B (Official Charts)	1
US Billboard Hot 100	6
US Adult Pop Airplay (Billboard)	40
US Dance Club Songs (Billboard)	1
US Dance Airplay (Billboard)	1
US Hot R&B/Hip-Hop Songs (Billboard)	18
US Mainstream Top 40 (Billboard)	2
US Rhythmic Airplay (Billboard)	7

=== Year-end charts ===
2006 year-end chart performance
Chart (2006)	Position
Australia (ARIA)	19
Australian Urban (ARIA)	3
Austria (Ö3 Austria Top 40)	16
Belgium (Ultratop 50 Flanders)	21
Belgium (Ultratop 50 Wallonia)	14
CIS (TopHit)	30
European Hot 100 Singles (Billboard)	7
France (SNEP)	57
Germany (Media Control GfK)	14
Hungary (Dance Top 40)	72
Hungary (Rádiós Top 40)	20
Ireland (IRMA)	14
Netherlands (Dutch Top 40)	25
Netherlands (Single Top 100)	33
Russia Airplay (TopHit)	31
Sweden (Hitlistan)	86
Switzerland (Schweizer Hitparade)	6
UK Singles (OCC)	23
US Billboard Hot 100	28
US Dance Club Play (Billboard)	47
US Hot Dance Airplay (Billboard)	14
US Rhythmic Airplay (Billboard)	35

2007 year-end chart performance
Chart (2007)	Position
CIS (TopHit)	118
Hungary (Rádiós Top 40)	85
Russia Airplay (TopHit)	149

=== Decade-end charts ===
Decade-end chart performance
Chart (2000–2009)	Position
Germany (Official German Charts)	43
Russia Airplay (TopHit)	106

== Certifications ==
Certifications
Region	Certification	Certified units/sales
Australia (ARIA)	4× Platinum	280,000^{‡}
Belgium (BRMA)	Gold	25,000^{*}
Brazil (Pro-Música Brasil)	Platinum	60,000^{‡}
Denmark (IFPI Danmark)	Platinum	15,000^{^}
Germany (BVMI)	3× Gold	450,000^{‡}
New Zealand (RMNZ)	Platinum	30,000^{‡}
Sweden (GLF)	Gold	10,000^{^}
Switzerland (IFPI Switzerland)	Gold	15,000^{^}
United Kingdom (BPI)	Platinum	600,000^{‡}
United States (RIAA) Mastertone	Platinum	1,000,000^{*}
United States (RIAA)	4× Platinum	4,000,000^{‡}
^{*} Sales figures based on certification alone.^{^} Shipments figures based on certification alone.^{‡} Sales+streaming figures based on certification alone.

== Release history ==
Release dates and formats
Region	Date	Format(s)	Label(s)	Ref.
United States	May 2, 2006	Contemporary hit radio; rhythmic contemporary radio	Def Jam; SRP	
Germany	July 14, 2006	CD	Universal Music	
United Kingdom	July 17, 2006	CD	Mercury	
Belgium	July 18, 2006	CD	Universal Music	
Germany	August 4, 2006	Maxi CD	Universal Music	
France	August 28, 2006	CD	Universal Music	

== See also ==
- List of Billboard Hot Dance Club Play number ones of 2006
- List of number-one singles of the 2000s (Switzerland)
