= Last Girl on Earth =

2010–11 concert tour by Rihanna

Last Girl on Earth Tour
- Tour by Rihanna
- Promotional poster for the tour
- Associated album: Rated R
- Start date: April 16, 2010
- End date: March 12, 2011
- Legs: 3
- No. of shows: 67

Rihanna concert chronology
- A Girl's Night Out (2008); Last Girl on Earth Tour (2010–11); Loud Tour (2011)

Last Girl on Earth was the third concert tour by Barbadian singer Rihanna. The tour visited Europe, North America and Australia to support her fourth studio album, Rated R (2009).

The tour was announced through MTV News in December 2009. In the interview, Rihanna stated, "It's going to be a worldwide tour, so it's going to be a very long tour. We'll definitely be in your city, so look out for that." The tour received generally positive reception.

== Background and development ==
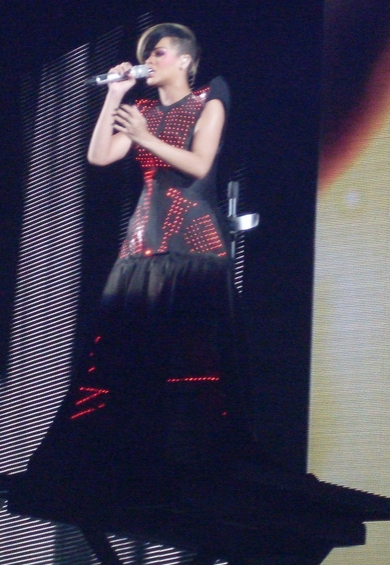
Performing "Russian Roulette" during the tour premiere in Antwerp

In an interview with Entertainment Tonight, Rihanna explained the tour's title. She stated, "I like to think about myself as 'The Last Girl on Earth' because sometimes people make decisions based on the outlook of others and, you know, to me, my life is my life. It's my world, and I'm going to live it the way I want to. That's how I think about everything, that way I'm focused on me, and my work. It's a really narrow space, a focus."

The tour, choreographed by Tina Landon, was officially announced on December 9, 2009, while on the set of the music video for "Hard". She also announced some dates for the European leg of the tour on her official website. It went on to gross over $9.1 million in North America from 26 shows according to Pollstar and the 2011 Australian leg of the tour added another $10 million to the total. English singer-songwriter Pixie Lott was selected as the opening act for the UK shows, along with last minute additions of Tinchy Stryder and Tinie Tempah. In an interview with MTV, she stated, "We've been ... coming out with different ideas and cool things that we can do. Things that we've never seen before, daring things – but now is when we really start with the rehearsal and we get into the nitty-gritty and the details of everything" while describing the vibe of the tour as "daring".

During rehearsals for the tour, Rihanna also took drum lessons from Travis Barker. This practice was later used during her cover of "The Glamorous Life" originally performed by Sheila E. In April 2010, the North American dates for the tour were announced. Although rapper Nicki Minaj was originally scheduled as an opening act, she withdrew from the tour to continue work on her debut album.

In March 2010, Israeli newspapers reported that Rihanna would play a date at Bloomfield Stadium, in Tel Aviv on May 30, 2010. The concert was sponsored by Orange Rockcorps. This organization allows those who volunteer in their community for at least four hours to attend the concert at no cost. It was later announced Rihanna will join the volunteers before the concert to do local work in the community.

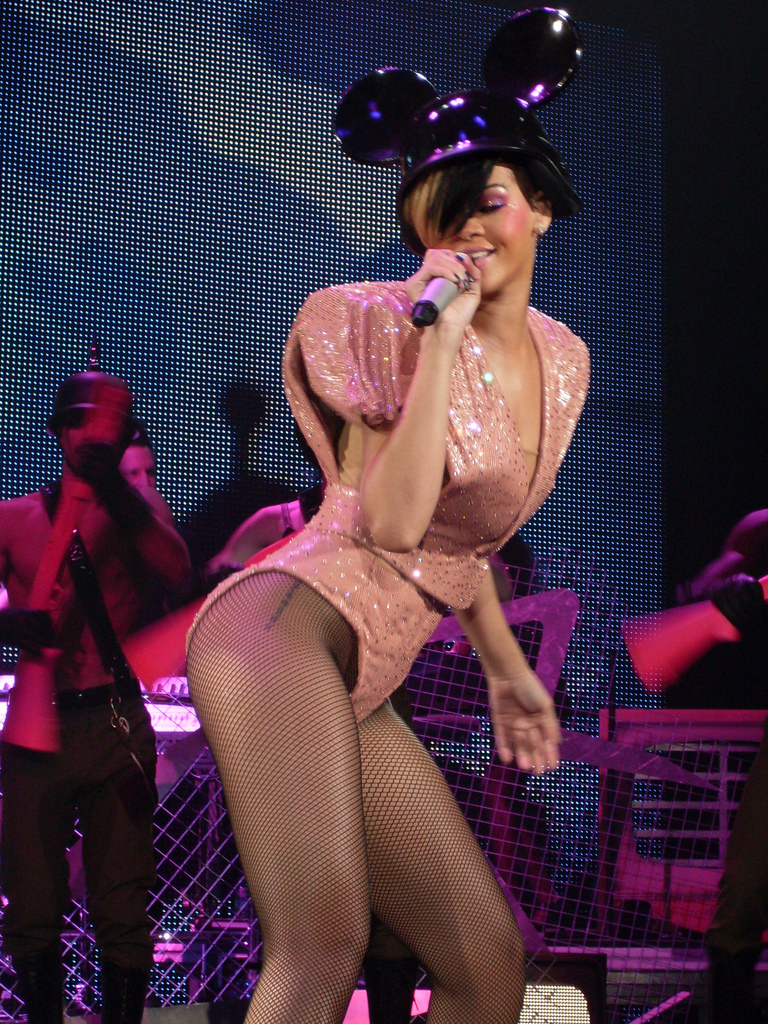
Performing "Hard" in Antwerp

In an interview with AOL, Rihanna revealed that fans should expect a big upgrade in comparison to her previous tours. She commented, "[w]e've never done a tour to this capacity. The production is unbelievable and the costumes, we just took it to a whole new level. Visually and sonically it's going to be a big step up from the last time. We just keep growing, and this time it is a massive production that I cannot wait for."

The tour is directed by Jamie King, who has previously worked with Madonna, Britney Spears and Avril Lavigne. Tina Landon, who has worked with Janet Jackson, will serve as choreographer. The creative director for the tour is Simon Henwood who was also the creative director of her 2009 album. Henwood explained: "[w]e talked extensively for months before the album's release, and looked at every aspect of the campaign – from styling to stage ideas and visuals [...] There is a great story that will unfold through the campaign, and finally reveal on the tour.. partly inspired by the film – The Omega Man and of course ideas from the songs – as well as Rihanna's personal visions."

Extreme's guitarist, Nuno Bettencourt, has signed on to lead the band. Bettencourt explained that the rehearsals have been "better than what I expected because she also has the most incredible band, and I get the privilege to add to their wall of sound. It's gonna be fun."

== Critical reception ==
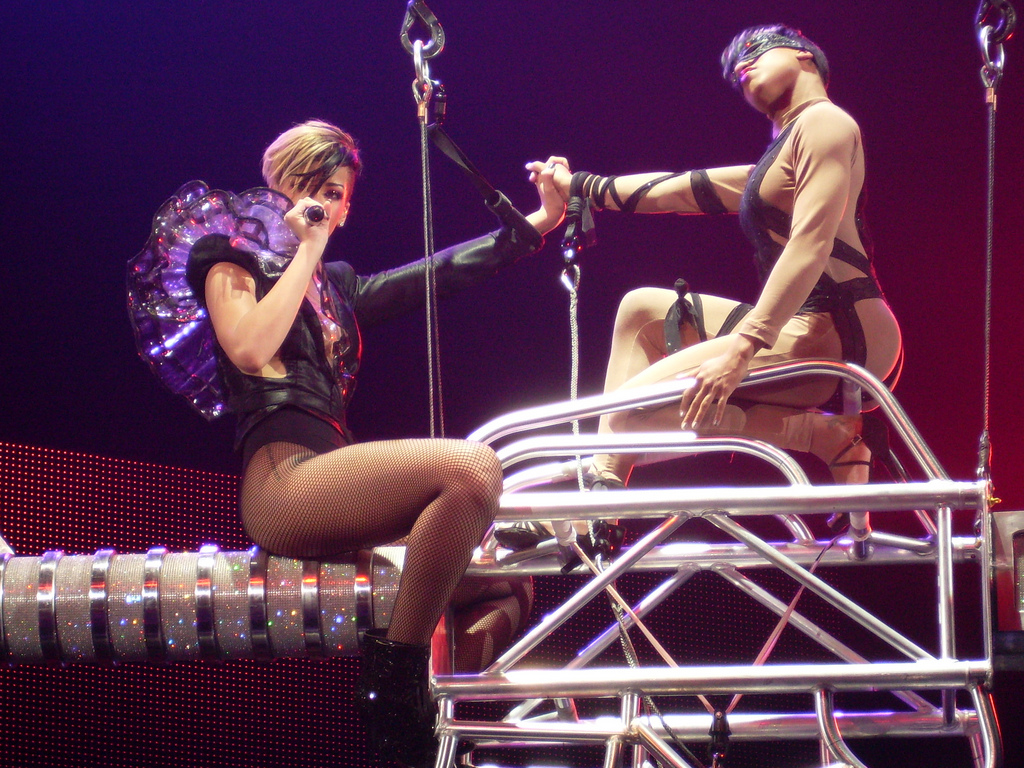
Rihanna performing during the tour

The Telegraph said, "On the opening night of the UK leg of her world tour, US R&B superstar Rihanna was taking no prisoners. She kicked off with the homicidal pop-rock ballad Russian Roulette to screen imagery of burning naked mannequins and had shed most of her clothes by her second song, which saw her straddling the gun barrel of a life-size pink tank while a semi-naked, military dance troupe twirled their rifles. Sex, violence and pyrotechnics (including big-screen mushroom clouds to accompany the incendiary Fire Bomb) were the themes of the evening. [...] Rihanna has a set full of hits and each is delivered with maximum bang for the audience's bucks, with revealing costumes, salacious dance routines, eye-catching props and sci-fi screens. [...] Her young, predominantly female fans genuinely adore Rihanna, and were full-throated whenever given the chance to join in. Sex and violence might make for effective 21st-century blockbuster entertainment but the price has been a loss of innocence, charm and individuality." BBC Radio 1 said, "The 22-year-old star wore a floor-length black dress with red flashing lights on it to kick off the show at The O2 Arena, which began with last year's single, Russian Roulette. [...] Speaking afterwards most of the audience appeared impressed with the show. [...] The gig ended with the star's biggest hit to date, Umbrella, which managed to hold the number one spot for 10 weeks in 2007. The Daily Mirror said, "Kicking off the Last Girl On Earth tour, where the running theme is Rihanna as the last human alive, she launches into a fiery Russian Roulette. [...] There was no miming. She's stepped up her game and ready to battle it out with the best of the new female acts." Mikael Wood from Rolling Stone reviewed the concert in Los Angeles and said that Rihanna held the "audience's attention throughout a nearly two-hour show full of costume changes, video bits and complicated set pieces [...]".

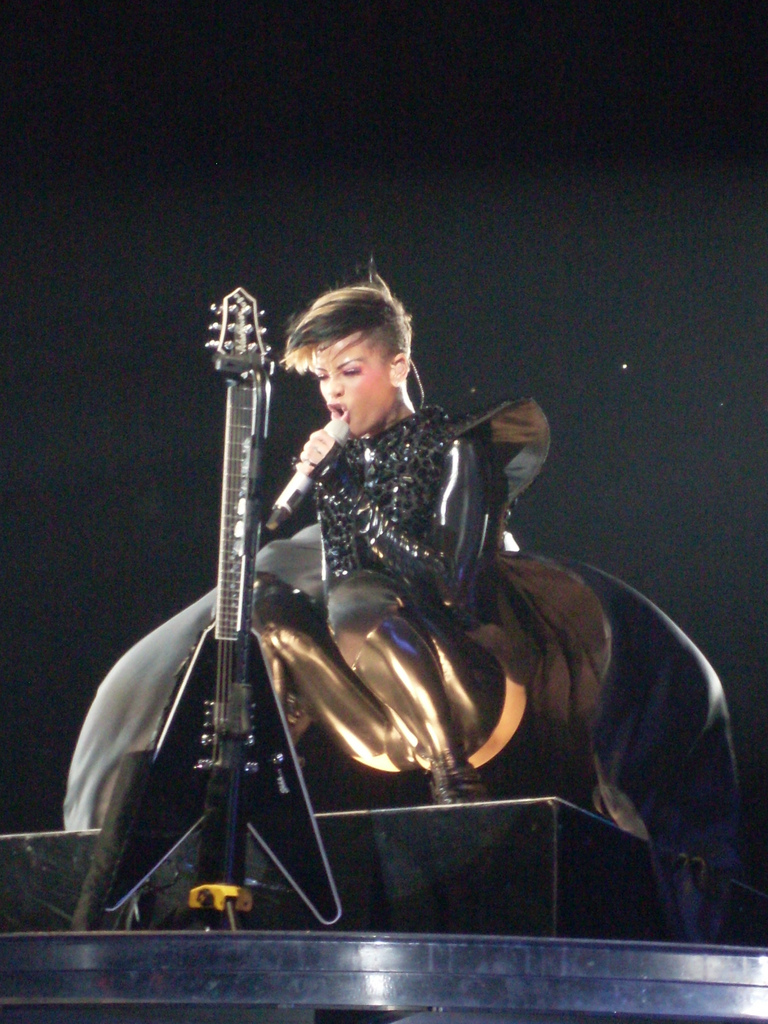
Rihanna performing "Rockstar 101" with a black guitar in front of her, stylistically reminiscent of particular scenes shown in the song's music video.

Jason Clevett of GayCalgary considered the show's theme reminiscent of Janet Jackson's The Velvet Rope Tour, particularly comparing Jackson's live renditions of "Rope Burn", "in which she tied an audience member to a bed and proceeded to seduce them", to Rihanna's performance of "Skin." Clay Clane of BET said of the show: "There may have been doubts, but Rihanna proved she has the star power to command a stage for nearly two hours. [...] Rihanna can sing and there were no signs of lip-synching. Rih never said she was Whitney Houston, and while she doesn't have a massive vocal range, she uses her voice well, sounding just like her records and belting out some notes that I didn't know were in her. The New York Post said, "Rihanna is a dream girl", who "kept the set lively with fireworks, an arsenal of gun props and a program that wove together the bubbly dance pop and the harder rock-flavored material featured on her recent Rated R record." From the show opener, "Russian Roulette", to the last encore song – her megahit "Umbrella" – Rihanna was electric for a performance that was amped-up and aggressive.

== Show incidents ==
On April 19, 2010, Rihanna made newspaper headlines when she was taken to hospital after her performance in Zürich. Rihanna's spokesperson says that she "had an injured rib and went to have it looked at to be sure it was nothing serious, and it wasn’t". Alenka Ambroz, head of the clinic's corporate communications said: "Rihanna arrived at the accident and emergency unit. We're not going to give any details." Rihanna, however, was still able to perform at the next show in Lyon, France, on April 20.

== Broadcasts and recordings ==
One of the two concerts at the Scottish Exhibition and Conference Centre in Glasgow, Scotland, was recorded and partially broadcast by several radio stations across Europe on May 26, 2010. The concert in Manchester was recorded and later broadcast by a German radio station. Additionally, the concert on June 5 at the Rock in Rio Festival in Madrid, Spain, was broadcast by Spanish television network TVE. No official DVD for the tour has been released or announced.

== Opening acts ==
- DJ Daddy K (Antwerp)
- Vitaa (France)
- Pixie Lott (United Kingdom) (select dates)
- Tinchy Stryder (London)
- Tinie Tempah (United Kingdom) (select dates)
- Houston Project (Israel)
- Vegas (Greece)
- Kesha (North America)
- Travie McCoy (North America) (select dates)
- DJ Brian Dawe (North America) (select dates)
- DJ Ross Rosco (Syracuse)
- J Brazil (Syracuse)
- Calvin Harris (Australia)
- Far East Movement (Australia)
- Alexis Jordan (Australia) (select dates)

== Set lists ==
=== 2010 ===
The following set list is from the April 21, 2010, show in Marseille, France. It is not intended to represent all dates throughout the 2010 leg.

1. "Mad House" (Introduction)
2. "Russian Roulette"
3. "Hard"
4. "Shut Up and Drive"
5. "Fire Bomb"
6. "Disturbia"
7. "Rockstar 101"
8. "Rude Boy"
9. "Wonderwall" (Oasis cover)
10. "Hate That I Love You"
11. "Rehab"
12. "Unfaithful"
13. "Stupid in Love"
14. "Te Amo"
15. "Pon de Replay" (Interlude)
16. "Don't Stop the Music"
17. "Breakin' Dishes"
18. "The Glamorous Life" (Sheila E cover)
19. "Let Me"
20. "SOS"
21. "Take a Bow"

Encore

22. "Wait Your Turn" / "Live Your Life" / "Run This Town"
23. "Umbrella"

=== Australia ===
The following set list is from the February 25, 2011, show in Brisbane, Australia. It is not intended to represent all dates throughout the Australian leg.

1. "Mad House" (Introduction)
2. "Only Girl (In the World)"
3. "Hard"
4. "Shut Up and Drive"
5. "Fire Bomb"
6. "Disturbia"
7. "Rockstar 101"
8. "S&M"
9. "Rude Boy"
10. "Hate That I Love You"
11. "Love the Way You Lie (Part II)"
12. "Unfaithful"
13. "Te Amo"
14. "What's My Name?"
15. "Don't Stop the Music"
16. "Breakin' Dishes"
17. "The Glamorous Life"
18. "Let Me"
19. "SOS"
20. "Take a Bow"

Encore

21. "Wait Your Turn" / "Live Your Life" / "Run This Town"
22. "Umbrella"

=== Notes ===
- "Photographs" was performed in Antwerp and Arnhem, after “Te Amo”.
- From May 30 to June 5, "Russian Roulette" was temporarily cut from the set list.
- In North America, “Love the Way You Lie” replaced “Wonderwall” and a cover of B.o.B's “Airplanes” was performed.
- Rihanna did not perform "Russian Roulette" during the show in Tucson.
- During the final show in Perth, Rihanna performed "Pon de Replay".

== Tour dates ==
List of 2010 concerts
| Date (2010) | City | Country | Venue |
|---|---|---|---|
| April 16 | Antwerp | Belgium | Sportpaleis |
| April 17 | Arnhem | Netherlands | GelreDome XS |
| April 19 | Zürich | Switzerland | Hallenstadion |
| April 20 | Lyon | France | Halle Tony Garnier |
| April 21 | Marseille | France | Le Dôme de Marseille |
| April 23 | Frankfurt | Germany | Festhalle Frankfurt |
| April 25 | Oberhausen | Germany | König Pilsener Arena |
| April 27 | Geneva | Switzerland | SEG Geneva Arena |
| April 28 | Paris | France | Palais Omnisports de Paris-Bercy |
| May 1 | Hamburg | Germany | Color Line Arena |
| May 2 | Berlin | Germany | O_{2} World |
| May 4 | Esch-sur-Alzette | Luxembourg | Rockhal |
| May 7 | Birmingham | England | LG Arena |
| May 8 | Liverpool | England | Echo Arena |
| May 10 | London | England | The O_{2} Arena |
| May 11 | London | England | The O_{2} Arena |
| May 13 | Sheffield | England | Sheffield Arena |
| May 14 | Nottingham | England | Trent FM Arena |
| May 16 | Manchester | England | Manchester Evening News Arena |
| May 17 | Newcastle | England | Metro Radio Arena |
| May 19 | Glasgow | Scotland | Scottish Exhibition Hall 4 |
| May 20 | Glasgow | Scotland | Scottish Exhibition Hall 4 |
| May 22 | Dublin | Ireland | The O_{2} |
| May 23 (Note: This concert was part of the Radio 1's Big Weekend) | Bangor | Wales | Vaynol Estate |
| May 24 | Belfast | Northern Ireland | Odyssey Arena |
| May 26 | Dublin | Ireland | The O_{2} |
| May 30 | Tel Aviv | Israel | Bloomfield Stadium |
| June 1 | Piraeus | Greece | Karaiskakis Stadium |
| June 3 | Istanbul | Turkey | Turkcell Kuruçeşme Arena |
| June 5 (Note: This concert was part of the Rock in Rio Madrid) | Madrid | Spain | Ciudad del Rock |
| June 6 (Note: This concert was part of the Summertime Ball) | London | England | Wembley Stadium |
| July 4 | Vancouver | Canada | General Motors Place |
| July 5 | Penticton | Canada | South Okanagan Events Centre |
| July 6 | Calgary | Canada | Pengrowth Saddledome |
| July 9 | Sacramento | United States | ARCO Arena |
| July 10 | Mountain View | United States | Shoreline Amphitheatre |
| July 14 | Albuquerque | United States | The Pavilion |
| July 17 | Las Vegas | United States | Mandalay Bay Events Center |
| July 18 | Anaheim | United States | Honda Center |
| July 21 | Los Angeles | United States | Staples Center |
| July 22 | Tucson | United States | Anselmo Valencia Tori Amphitheater |
| July 24 | Laredo | United States | Laredo Energy Arena |
| July 25 | San Antonio | United States | AT&T Center |
| July 30 | Tampa | United States | 1-800-Ask-Gary Amphitheatre |
| July 31 | Miami | United States | American Airlines Arena |
| August 5 | Toronto | Canada | Molson Canadian Amphitheatre |
| August 7 | Montreal | Canada | Bell Centre |
| August 8 | Mansfield | United States | Comcast Center |
| August 11 | Uncasville | United States | Mohegan Sun Arena |
| August 12 | New York City | United States | Madison Square Garden |
| August 14 | Atlantic City | United States | Borgata Event Center |
| August 15 | Wantagh | United States | Nikon at Jones Beach Theater |
| August 18 | Camden | United States | Susquehanna Bank Center |
| August 20 | Bristow | United States | Jiffy Lube Live |
| August 21 | Hershey | United States | Hersheypark Stadium |
| August 22 | Clarkston | United States | DTE Energy Music Theatre |
| August 25 | Chicago | United States | United Center |
| August 28 (Note: This concert was part of the Great New York State Fair) | Syracuse | United States | Mohegan Sun Grandstand |

List of 2011 concerts
| Date (2011) | City | Country | Venue |
|---|---|---|---|
| February 25 | Brisbane | Australia | Brisbane Entertainment Centre |
| February 26 | Gold Coast | Australia | GCCEC Arena |
| February 28 | Newcastle | Australia | Newcastle Entertainment Centre |
| March 4 | Sydney | Australia | Acer Arena |
| March 5 | Sydney | Australia | Acer Arena |
| March 7 | Melbourne | Australia | Rod Laver Arena |
| March 8 | Melbourne | Australia | Rod Laver Arena |
| March 10 | Adelaide | Australia | Adelaide Entertainment Centre |
| March 12 | Perth | Australia | Burswood Dome |

=== Cancelled shows ===
| July 2 | Auburn, Washington | White River Amphitheatre | Production changes |
| July 12 | West Valley City | USANA Amphitheatre | Cancelled |
| July 15 | Greenwood Village | Comfort Dental Amphitheatre | Cancelled |
| July 22 | Phoenix | Cricket Wireless Pavilion | Moved to the Anselmo Valencia Tori Amphitheater in Tucson, Arizona |
| July 24 | Dallas | Superpages.com Center | Moved to the Laredo Energy Arena in Laredo, Texas |
| July 28 | Atlanta | Philips Arena | Cancelled |
| August 3 | Noblesville | Verizon Wireless Music Center | Cancelled |

=== Box office score data ===
| Venue | City | Tickets sold / Available | Gross revenue |
|---|---|---|---|
| Sportpaleis | Antwerp | 15,653 / 15,862 (99%) | $889,266 |
| Palais Omnisports de Paris-Bercy | Paris | 15,733 / 16,348 (96%) | $1,184,640 |
| Color Line Arena | Hamburg | 7,927 / 11,589 (68%) | $586,496 |
| LG Arena | Birmingham | 12,909 / 14,998 (86%) | $812,909 |
| Echo Arena | Liverpool | 10,581 / 10,581 (100%) | $654,120 |
| The O_{2} Arena | London | 30,813 / 33,018 (93%) | $1,905,800 |
| Sheffield Arena | Sheffield | 8,091 / 10,140 (80%) | $506,019 |
| Trent FM Arena | Nottingham | 8,022 / 9,567 (84%) | $496,754 |
| Manchester Evening News Arena | Manchester | 12,678 / 13,631 (93%) | $773,704 |
| Metro Radio Arena | Newcastle | 8,258 / 9,757 (85%) | $503,928 |
| The O_{2} | Dublin | 21,535 / 24,078 (89%) | $1,198,040 |
| Odyssey Arena | Belfast | 9,286 / 9,286 (100%) | $529,312 |
| Shoreline Amphitheater | Mountain View | 19,678 / 22,000 (90%) | $1,394,200 |
| Staples Center | Los Angeles | 19,992 / 19,992 (100%) | $1,359,456 |
| Bell Centre | Montreal | 10,778 / 10,778 (100%) | $785,707 |
| Madison Square Garden | New York City | 14,331 / 14,331 (100%) | $1,271,547 |
| Hersheypark Stadium | Hershey | 11,400 / 14,567 (78%) | $469,285 |
| DTE Energy Music Theatre | Clarkston | 14,381 / 14,381 (100%) | $535,276 |
| Brisbane Entertainment Centre | Brisbane | 10,788 / 11,168 (97%) | $1,415,830 |
| Newcastle Entertainment Centre | Newcastle | 6,505 / 7,243 (78%) | $783,748 |
| Acer Arena | Sydney | 22,406 / 22,406 (100%) | $2,929,180 |
| Rod Laver Arena | Melbourne | 23,090 / 23,650 (98%) | $2,672,630 |
| Adelaide Entertainment Centre | Adelaide | 7,924 / 9,961 (79%) | $866,215 |
| Burswood Dome | Perth | 11,655 / 22,024 (52%) | $1,278,250 |
| TOTAL | | 294,744 / 329,364 (89%) | $24,248,656 |

== Personnel ==
Credits adapted from the official tour book:

Management Rebel One, LLC:

- Marc Jordan
- Christa Shaub
- Ian McEvily
- Mecia Hollar
- Zsuzsa Cook
- Ali DiEmidio
- Gina Pappera-Ewing

Creative Direction

- Jamie King (Show Direction/Staging)
- Rihanna (Show Direction/Staging/Creative Director)
- Carla Kama (Assistant to Show Direction)
- Simon Henwood (Creative Director)
- Sam Hope (Producer to Creative Director)
- Tee Lapan, Fannie Schiavoni (Assistant to Creative Director)
- Tina Landon (Choreographer)
- Jason Myhre (Assistant to Choreographer)
- Tanisha Scott (Choreographer)
- DonDraico Johnson, Jose Ramos (Assistant to Choreographer)
- Dreya Weber (Aerial Choreographer)
- Alfred Kendrick (Capoeira Consultant)
- Gemma Nguyen (Martial Art Consultant)

Dancers

- Chase Benz (Dance Captain)
- Reina Hidalgo (Aerial Captain)
- Whyley Yoschimura (Swing Dancer)
- Tracy Shibata
- Bryan Tanaka
- Khasan Brailsford
- Oren Michaeli

Stylists and Assistant

- Mariel Haenn (Stylist)
- Robert Zangardi (Stylist)
- Ursula Stephen (Hair)
- Karin Darnell and Maylah Morales (Makeup)
- Jennifer Rosales (Rihanna's Personal Assistant)

The Band

- Tony Bruno (Music Director)
- Eric Smith (Band Leader/Bass)
- Nuno Bettencourt (Lead Guitar)
- Adam Ross (Guitar)
- Chris Johnson (Drums)
- Kevin Hastings (Lead Keyboards)
- Hannah Vasanth (Keyboards)

Background Vocals

- Ashleigh Haney
- Kim Ince

Production Crew

- Chris Lamb (Production tour Director)
- Vicki Huxel (Production Assistant)
- TJ Thompson (Stage Manager)
- Thomas Reitz (Tour Manager)
- Jean Paul Firmin (Road Manager)
- Mark Aurelio (Accountant)
- Ted Schroeder (Head Carpenter & Hydraulics)
- Patrick Harbin (Carpenter/Hydraulics)
- Joe Bodner, Jason De Leu, Bobby Marshall, Aaron Broderick (Carpenter)
- Jorge Guadalupe (Show Call Manager/Carpenter)
- Bill Rengstl (Head Rigger)
- Chris Achzet (Drum Tech)
- Tommy Simpson, David Barrera (Guitar Tech)
- Dan Roe (Keyboard Tech)
- Ian Tucker (Lighting Crew Chief)
- Jesse Blevins (Lighting Director)
- Chris Sabelleck, Todd Erickson, Kris Lundberg, Todd Erickson (Lighting Tech)

Catering

- Fancky Boullet
- Charles Amos
- Kelvyn Mackenzie
- Marcus Jones
- Scott Findlay
- Renette Cronje
