= Rehab (Rihanna song) =

2008 single by Rihanna

Single by Rihanna

from the album Good Girl Gone Bad
- Released: October 6, 2008
- Recorded: January 2007
- Studio: Roc the Mic (New York City)
- Genre: R&B
- Length: 4:54
- Label: Def Jam; SRP
- Songwriters: Justin Timberlake; Timothy Mosley; Hannon Lane
- Producers: Timbaland; Lane; Timberlake

Rihanna singles chronology
"Live Your Life" (2008)	"Rehab" (2008)	"Run This Town" (2009)

Music video
- "Rehab" on YouTube

"Rehab" is a song by Barbadian singer Rihanna from her third studio album, Good Girl Gone Bad (2007). Def Jam Recordings serviced the song to contemporary hit radio in the United States on October 6, 2008, as the fifth and final single from the album. It was released in the United Kingdom as a CD single on December 8, 2008.

Development of "Rehab" began while Rihanna was accompanying Timbaland on Justin Timberlake's FutureSex/LoveShow tour in 2007. Timberlake wrote the song in collaboration with his producers, Hannon Lane and Timbaland, and provided additional vocals. "Rehab" is a mid-paced R&B song with an emotional, melancholy chorus; the lyrics are about the protagonist's painful memories of her former lover, who is portrayed metaphorically as a disease.

"Rehab" reached top-ten positions on the singles charts in Austria, Germany, the Netherlands and Norway. It reached number 16 on the UK Singles Chart and number 18 on the US Billboard Hot 100. It was certified double platinum by the Recording Industry Association of America (RIAA). Anthony Mandler directed the accompanying music video, which was shot in Vasquez Rocks Park, near Los Angeles. It won the Urban Music Award for Best Music Video. Rihanna performed "Rehab" on the Good Girl Gone Bad Tour (2007–2009), and occasionally on the Last Girl on Earth (2010–2011).

== Production and release ==
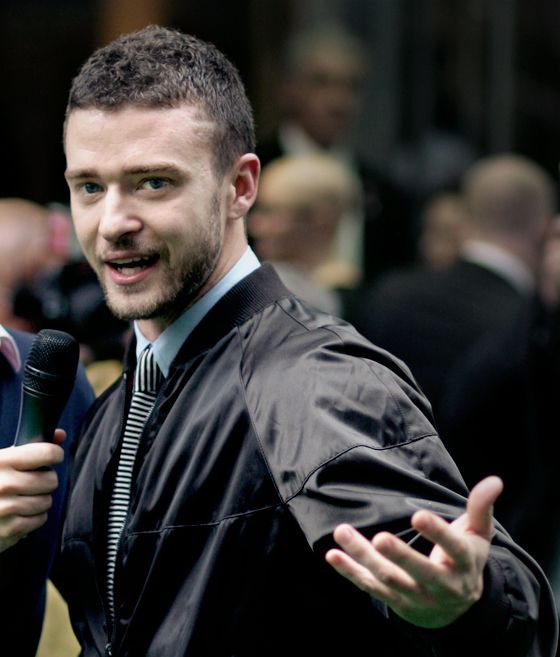
According to Rihanna, Timberlake wrote the song's lyrics "in his head. He didn't write anything on paper. He went into the booth and sang it."

"Rehab" is one of the three songs composed and produced by Timbaland for Rihanna's third studio album, Good Girl Gone Bad. Timbaland was on tour with Justin Timberlake for the FutureSex/LoveShow to promote Timberlake's 2006 album FutureSex/LoveSounds, which Timbaland had also produced. After completing a show in Chicago, they joined Rihanna in the studio, where Timberlake experimented with beats and melodies. Weeks later, the three got together in New York City, where Timberlake had already conceptualized a song for Rihanna. Timbaland, who wanted to compose a song called "Rehab" for Rihanna, was producing a beat, when Timberlake came in and improvised the song over it. Hannon Lane co-wrote and co-produced the song, and Demacio Castellon recorded and mixed it in 2007 at Roc The Mic Studios in New York City. Rihanna's stint with Timbaland also resulted in "Sell Me Candy" and "Lemme Get That", produced for Good Girl Gone Bad.

Timberlake told Entertainment Weekly that he believed "Rehab" to be "the bridge for [Rihanna] to be accepted as an adult in the music industry". Rihanna told Robert Copsey of Digital Spy that she enjoyed working with Timberlake, and learned much from the sessions. She said, "Working with Justin in the studio is just great. He's a fun guy and likes to make all the sessions enjoyable. He's also such a genius when it comes to lyrics."

"Rehab" was the eighth and final single to be released from Rihanna's third studio album Good Girl Gone Bad (2007). According to American music magazine Rap-Up, both "Breakin' Dishes" and "Rehab" were potential single releases, but "Rehab" was chosen. Def Jam Recordings released the song for airplay on contemporary hit radio in the United States on October 6, 2008. On November 3, 2008, it was released to rhythmic contemporary and urban contemporary radio stations. The single was released in the UK by Mercury Records on December 8, 2008, as a CD single containing both the album version and an instrumental version of "Rehab". On the same date, it was released as a digital download in Ireland. A live performance of the song, recorded in Manchester during Rihanna's Good Girl Gone Bad Tour (2007–2009), was released for download on the UK and Ireland iTunes Stores. The performance was featured on Rihanna's DVD Good Girl Gone Bad Live.

On December 12, 2008, the song and its instrumental version were released on iTunes and 7digital in ten countries, including Australia, Italy, New Zealand, Spain and Switzerland. In January 2009, it was released as a CD single in Germany, with the same material as in the UK release. In early 2009, Timbaland signed a contract with Verizon Communications, under which he would create music exclusively for BlackBerry Storm mobile phone owners. He was contracted to work with various artists and remix their songs, which would be available for Verizon customers to download at no extra cost. "Rehab" was the first song remixed for the project, and this version was released in Canada and the US on May 19, 2009, via iTunes.

== Composition ==
"Rehab" is a mid-tempo R&B ballad with a subtle backbeat. According to the digital sheet music published by Sony/ATV Music Publishing, it is written in the key of G minor and set in common time, with a moderately slow tempo. The vocal range spans nearly an octave and a half from F_{3} to B♭_{4}. "Rehab" opens with a string section, played by Stevie Blacke, and a violin, cello, and tambourine instrumental groove with Hannon Lane's keyboard melody. Rihanna then sings the opening lines, "Baby, baby, when we first met, I never felt something so strong".

Critics noted similarities among the structures of "Rehab" and some of Timberlake's songs, such as "What Goes Around... Comes Around" and "Cry Me a River". Spence D. of IGN wrote that the song has an "R&B swoon", similar to Rihanna's previous singles. In an interview with Margeaux Watson for Entertainment Weekly, Rihanna explained the meaning of the song's lyrics: "'Rehab' is a metaphorical song. Rehab really just means we have to get over the guy. So we talk about checking ourselves into rehab, meaning we have to get over him. And we compare the guy to a disease or an addiction." Watson further called the song a "lovesick ballad".

== Critical reception ==
Rodney Dugue of The Village Voice called it one of the standout songs on Good Girl Gone Bad, and Sarah Rodman of The Boston Globe said it was essential to the album. Quentin B. Huff of PopMatters called it a "little gem" and compared it to Babyface's collaboration with Madonna on her 1994 single "Take a Bow". Billboard magazine called the song a highlight of the album, with "slinky-assisted Timberlake background vocals, tension-filled production, and contrasting strings and guitars." Vibe's Shanel Odum, while reviewing Good Girl Gone Bad, noted that the album predominantly consists of up-tempo songs, while the ballads are its weak part, eventually being "saved" by "Rehab". Spence D. of IGN stated that Timberlake and Rihanna work well together, thanks to their similar vocal ranges. He wrote that the song "reverts to Rihanna's old styled R&B swoon, the groove being built around tambourine shakes, acoustic guitar swirls, and a subtle backbeat." Doug Rule of Metro Weekly wrote that "Rehab" "is its own distinctive song—and a fetching one at that—but the resemblance to one of Timberlake's best is unmistakable." Sylvia Patterson from The Guardian described the song as a "mournful tale of lost love feeling like a catastrophic rehab meltdown".

Tom Breinan of Pitchfork Media wrote that Rihanna "comes closer than usual to depicting something resembling human emotion, but she still comes off sounding like a robot programmed to impersonate Alanis Morissette." Neil Drumming of Entertainment Weekly wrote, "Rehab is a joyless overdose of mid-tempo melodrama". Sal Cinquemani of Slant Magazine said that "Rehab" proves that Timberlake "is better off penning lyrics about sexy backs or dicks in boxes"—a reference to Timberlake's 2006 singles "SexyBack" and "Dick in a Box" (with The Lonely Island).

== Chart performance ==
"Rehab" entered the US Billboard Hot 100 chart at number 91 on November 22, 2008, and peaked at number 18, making it Rihanna's twelfth US top-twenty single. It also peaked at number 17 on Billboard's Pop Songs chart and at number 52 on the Hot R&B/Hip-Hop Songs chart. The song rose to number 19 on the Canadian Hot 100 chart, having started at number 56 on December 6, 2008. It entered the Australian ARIA Singles Chart at number 37 on November 17, 2008 and eventually reached number 26, thus becoming Rihanna's twelfth consecutive top-thirty single in Australia. In New Zealand, it first entered the singles chart at number 24 on October 27, 2008, and rose to number 12. On January 11, 2009, it was certified gold by the Recording Industry Association of New Zealand (RIANZ), 12 weeks after it first charted.

"Rehab" first appeared in the UK Singles Chart at number 51 on November 22, 2008. After two weeks, it became the greatest gainer on the chart, climbing twenty-seven places to number 24, and in the week after that, it reached its peak of 16. More than 160,000 copies of the song have been sold in the UK. The single debuted at number 33 on the Ö3 Austria Top 40 and peaked at number nine. In Germany it reached number 4 and became Rihanna's sixth top-five single. "Rehab" started at number 18 in the Dutch Top 40 on January 17, 2009, and peaked at number 3 in its fourth week on the chart. In France, the song didn't entered in the French Singles Chart, the main French music chart, but entered in French Download Top 50, and peaked at number 30. In Norway, it entered the singles chart at number 19 and climbed to number 4, becoming Rihanna's seventh top-five single in that country. It peaked at number 8 on the Slovak singles chart, becoming Rihanna's fifth international top-ten single, and her sixth top-ten single in Slovakia. It has also peaked at #1 in Israel, the only country in which it did.

== Music video ==
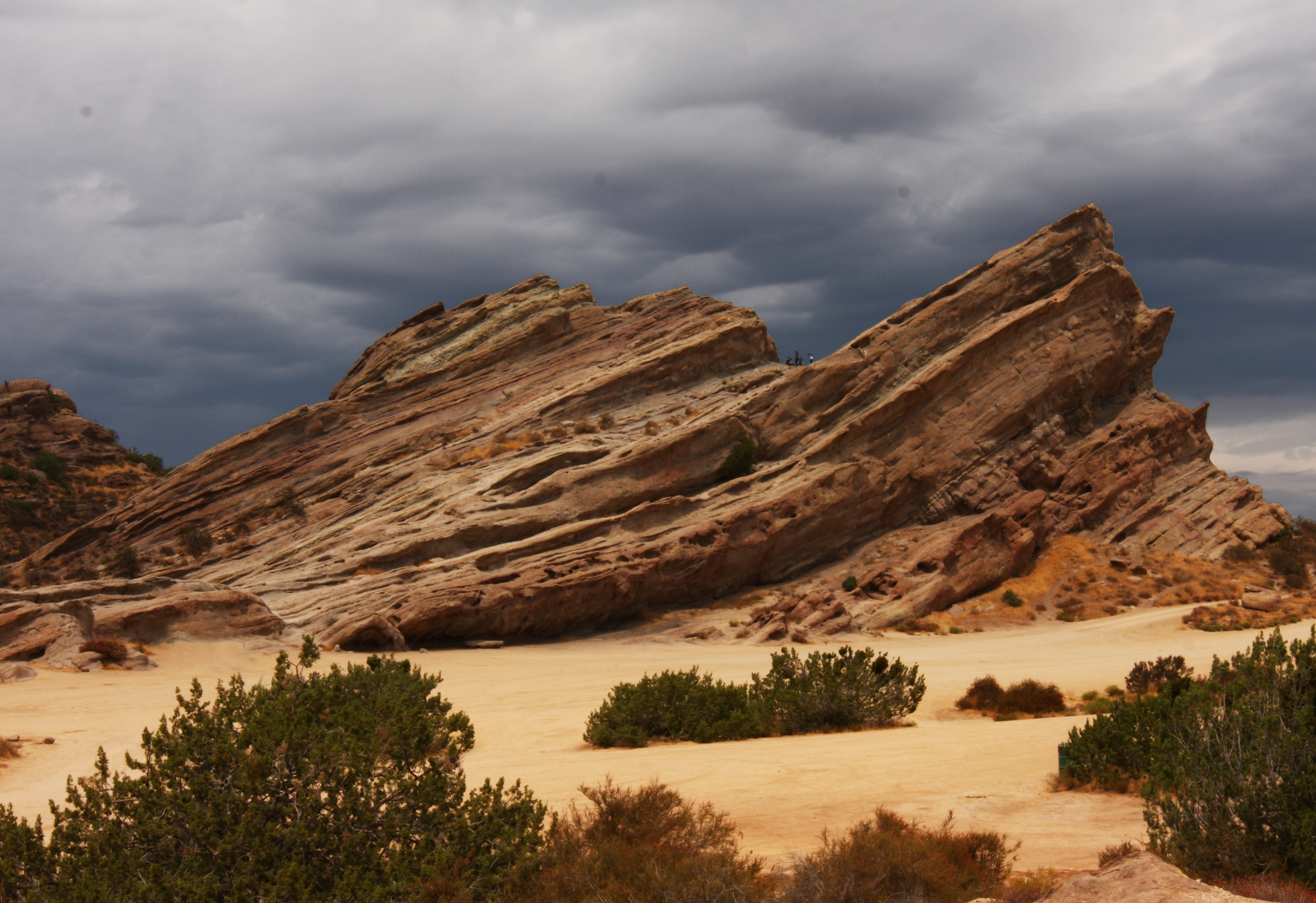
The video for "Rehab" was shot at Vasquez Rocks Park (pictured), near Los Angeles.

Rihanna filmed the music video for "Rehab" with Justin Timberlake at Vasquez Rocks Park, near Los Angeles, on October 22, 2008. It was directed by Anthony Mandler, who directed the videos for Rihanna's 2008 singles "Take a Bow" and "Disturbia". Simon Reynolds of Digital Spy said that Timberlake's girlfriend Jessica Biel was "said to be 'sick to her stomach' after seeing Rihanna wearing a revealing outfit while filming with Timberlake." Timberlake told Access Hollywood, "I'm the guy in the video, so I had to give them all insecurities about that. But yeah we had a great time, we goofed around at the shoot most of the time." The video premiered November 17, 2008, on MTV and Rihanna's YouTube channel.

The video begins as Rihanna, scantily dressed and wearing fishnet stockings, stands against a convertible car in a desert. Timberlake, wearing a leather jacket and black jeans, arrives on a motorcycle. He unbuttons his jacket to cool down and bathes in pink-colored water before greeting Rihanna at her Airstream trailer. The pair then climb onto the hood of the vintage car. In the next scene, Timberlake plays a guitar while lying on a large rocket.

David Balls of Digital Spy wrote, "The pop pair put in such a highly-charged, effortlessly sexual display that it's no surprise Justin's lady was far from happy." In his book Post Cinematic Affect (2010), Steven Shaviro wrote that, in the videos of "Rehab", "Love Sex Magic" and "4 Minutes", Timberlake "radiates a smothering sexual heat", and that these videos "can be contrasted with the videos from Timberlake's own Future Sex/Love Sounds album which Joshua Clover convincingly describes as a 'homosocial' exchange between Timberlake and his producer Timbaland". The "Rehab" video won the Best Music Video award at the 2009 Urban Music Awards.

== Live performances ==
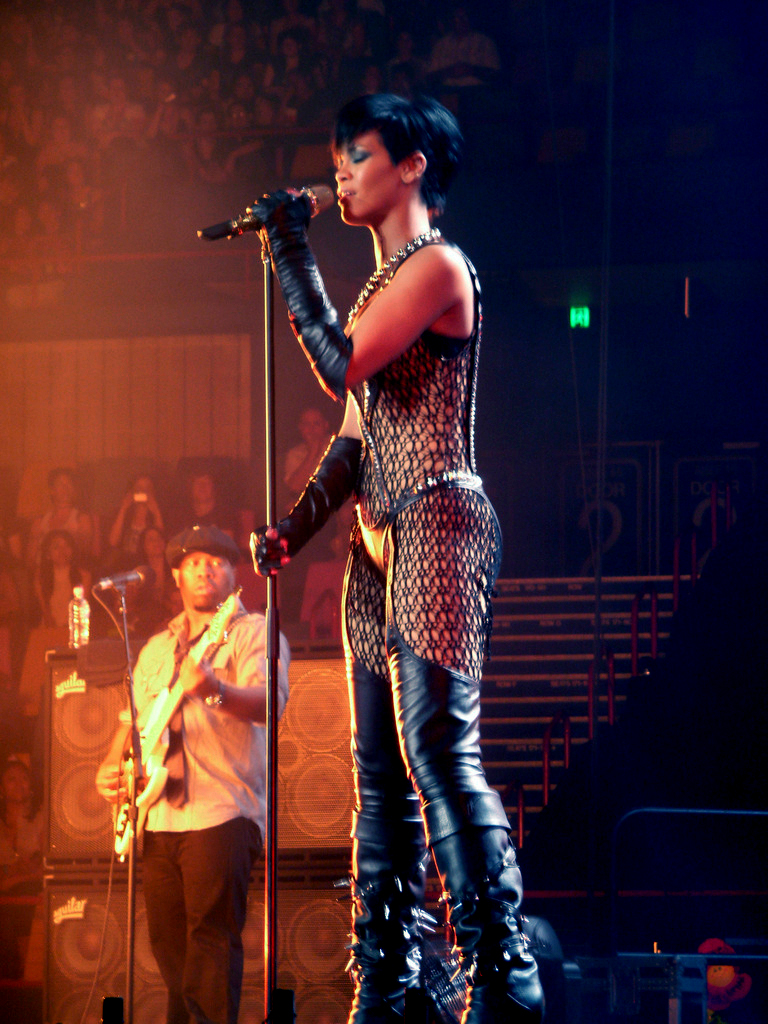
Rihanna performing in Brisbane on her Good Girl Gone Bad Tour

On April 28, 2008, Rihanna performed at the Pepsi Center with Kanye West, N.E.R.D, and Lupe Fiasco as part of West's Glow in the Dark Tour. She sang "Rehab" and other songs from Good Girl Gone Bad. John Wenzel of The Denver Post wrote that "Rehab" and other songs "would have benefited from more backing vocals, or perhaps a more focused performance approach". To promote the single, Rihanna performed "Rehab" live on November 23, 2008, at the 2008 American Music Awards, where she won the awards for Favorite Pop/Rock Female Artist and Favorite Soul/R&B Female Artist. At the awards ceremony, she performed it wearing an eye patch, which she later removed after she was lowered to the main stage.

"Rehab" was the fourth song on the set list for Rihanna's Good Girl Gone Bad Tour (2007–2009). Her performance in Manchester was released in the UK through iTunes and is featured on the Good Girl Gone Bad Live DVD. Rihanna performed "Rehab" on February 7, 2009, at a pre-Grammy party. She was scheduled to perform at the 51st Annual Grammy Awards ceremony, but canceled her performance after an altercation with her then boyfriend, singer Chris Brown.

"Rehab" was the twelfth song on Rihanna's set list for her 2010 Last Girl on Earth Tour, throughout which she performed it on a therapist's couch adorned with metal casts of human heads and limbs. David Sprague of Variety called her performance of "Rehab" at Madison Square Garden dishearteningly leaden. Ben Ratliff from The New York Times wrote that "Rihanna's lip curl during 'Rehab' and her low hip-grind during 'Rude Boy' were the smash hits of her body language." Deborah Linton of City Life wrote that Rihanna "even manages to make a psychiatric couch look sexy". Linton called the show's stage sets impressive and imaginative. Rick Massimo of The Providence Journal wrote that Rihanna "looked like a neon-sign rendition of herself during 'Rehab', rarely addressed the audience, and didn't rise above flat cliché in that until the very end of the show". "Rehab" and Rihanna's 2009 single "Russian Roulette" were excluded from the set list during the tour's Australian leg.

== Formats and track listings ==
- CD single and digital download
1. "Rehab" – 4:54
2. "Rehab" (Instrumental) – 4:54
- US and Canadian exclusive digital download
1. "Rehab" (Timbaland Remix) – 3:30

== Credits and personnel ==
Credits are taken from the Good Girl Gone Bad liner notes.

Locations

- Vocals recorded at Roc the Mic Studios, New York City, New York; mixed at The Hit Factory Criteria in Miami, Florida

Personnel

- Rihanna – lead vocals
- Justin Timberlake – additional vocals, background vocals, writing, vocal production
- Timothy "Timbaland" Mosley – writing, production
- Hannon Lane – writing, co-production
- Demacio Castellon – recording, mixing
- Shane Woodley – recording assistant
- Marcos Tovar – recording assistant
- Stevie Blacke – violin, cello

== Charts ==
=== Weekly charts ===
Weekly chart performance
Chart (2008–2009)	Peak position
Australia (ARIA)	26
Austria (Ö3 Austria Top 40)	9
Belgium (Ultratip Bubbling Under Flanders)	14
Belgium (Ultratip Bubbling Under Wallonia)	6
Canada Hot 100 (Billboard)	19
Czech Republic Airplay (ČNS IFPI)	25
Denmark (Tracklisten)	16
Europe (Eurochart Hot 100)	13
France Download (SNEP)	30
Germany (GfK)	4
Hungary (Rádiós Top 40)	21
Ireland (IRMA)	22
Israel (Media Forest)	1
Italy (FIMI)	30
Netherlands (Dutch Top 40)	3
Netherlands (Single Top 100)	18
New Zealand (Recorded Music NZ)	12
Norway (VG-lista)	4
Slovakia (IFPI)	8
Sweden (Sverigetopplistan)	28
Switzerland (Schweizer Hitparade)	13
UK Singles (Official Charts)	16
UK Airplay (Music Week)	16
UK Hip Hop/R&B (Official Charts)	7
US Billboard Hot 100	18
US Hot R&B/Hip-Hop Songs (Billboard)	52
US Pop Airplay (Billboard)	17
US Rhythmic Airplay (Billboard)	19

=== Monthly charts ===
Monthly chart performance
Chart (2010)	Peak position
Brazil (Brasil Hot 100 Airplay)	35

=== Year-end charts ===
Year-end chart performance
Chart (2009)	Position
Austria (Ö3 Austria Top 75)	74
Brazil (Crowley)	52
Canada (Canadian Hot 100)	89
Germany (Media Control GfK)	57
Hungary (Rádiós Top 40)	89
Netherlands (Dutch Top 40)	44
Switzerland (Schweizer Hitparade)	65
UK Singles (OCC)	139

== Certifications ==
Certifications
Region	Certification	Certified units/sales
Australia (ARIA)	2× Platinum	140,000^{‡}
Brazil (Pro-Música Brasil)	Diamond	250,000^{‡}
Denmark (IFPI Danmark)	Platinum	90,000^{‡}
Germany (BVMI)	Platinum	300,000^{‡}
New Zealand (RMNZ)	2× Platinum	60,000^{‡}
United Kingdom (BPI)	Platinum	600,000^{‡}
United States (RIAA)	2× Platinum	2,000,000^{‡}
^{‡} Sales+streaming figures based on certification alone.

== Release history ==
Release dates and formats
Region	Date	Format(s)	Version(s)	Label	Ref.
United States	October 6, 2008	Contemporary hit radio	Original	Def Jam	
United States	November 3, 2008	Rhythmic contemporary radio; urban contemporary radio	Original	Def Jam	
Ireland	December 8, 2008	Digital download	Live from MEN Arena	Universal	
United Kingdom	December 8, 2008	CD	Original; instrumental	Mercury	
Australia	December 12, 2008	Digital download	Original; instrumental	Def Jam	
Italy	December 12, 2008	Digital download	Original; instrumental	Def Jam	
Netherlands	December 12, 2008	Digital download	Original; instrumental	Def Jam	
New Zealand	December 12, 2008	Digital download	Original; instrumental	Def Jam	
Norway	December 12, 2008	Digital download	Original; instrumental	Def Jam	
Spain	December 12, 2008	Digital download	Original; instrumental	Def Jam	
Sweden	December 12, 2008	Digital download	Original; instrumental	Def Jam	
Switzerland	December 12, 2008	Digital download	Original; instrumental	Def Jam	
Belgium	December 15, 2008	Digital download	Original; instrumental	Def Jam	
Portugal	December 15, 2008	Digital download	Original; instrumental	Def Jam	
Austria	December 19, 2008	Digital download	Original; instrumental	Universal	
Germany	January 9, 2009	CD	Original; instrumental	Universal	
Canada	May 19, 2009	Digital download	Timbaland remix	Def Jam	
