= August Hall =

Music venue in San Francisco, California, US

Coordinates: 37°47′15″N 122°24′35″W

- Regency III (1975); Stage Door Theater (1989); Ruby Skye (1990–2017)
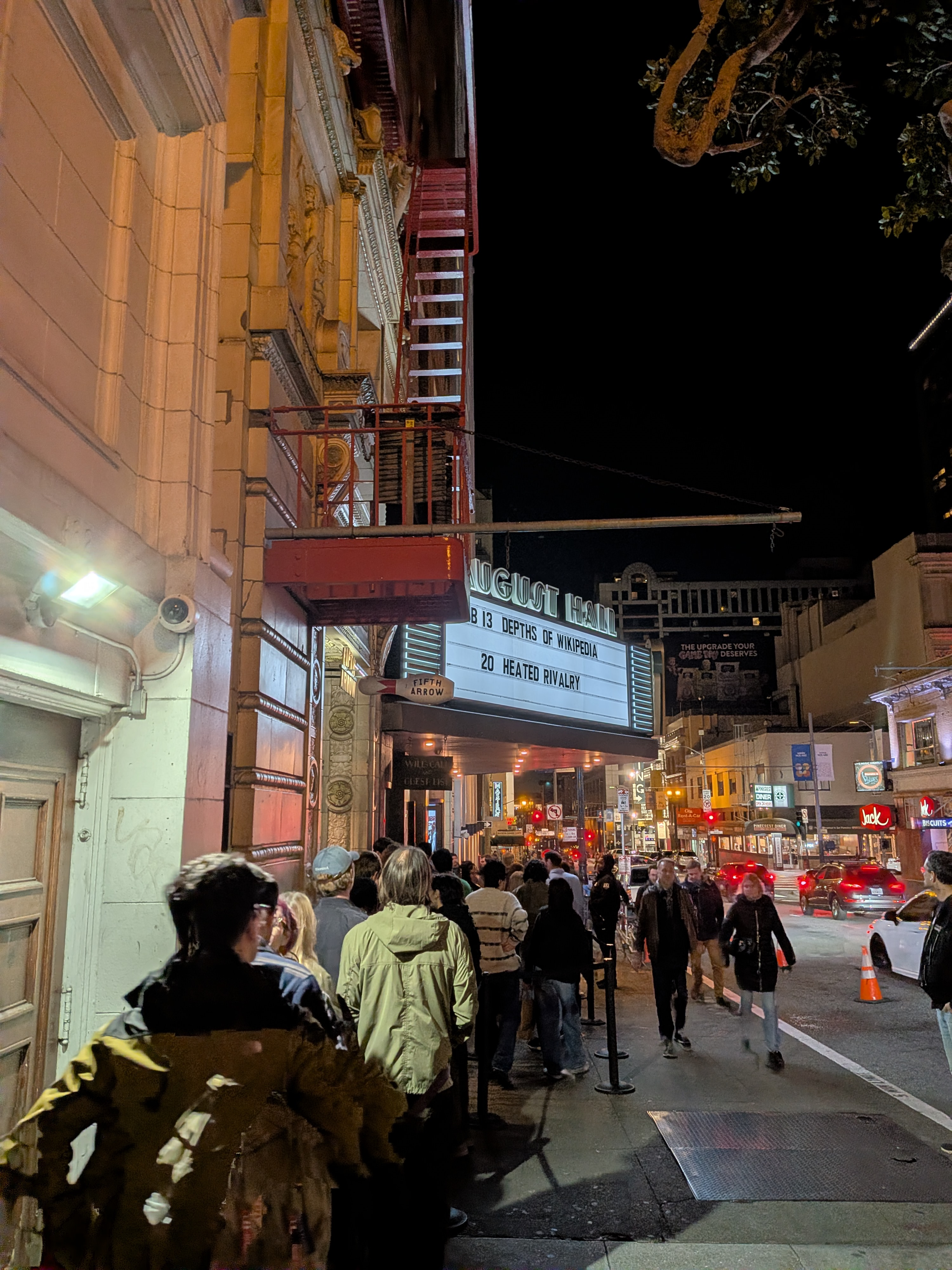
- Front entrance of August Hall in 2026
- Interactive map of August Hall
- Address: 420 Mason Street; San Francisco, California; United States
- Capacity: 900
- Current use: Music/Event Venue

Construction
- Opened: 1990
- Closed: 2017
- Rebuilt: 2000
- Architect: August Headman

Website
- www.augusthallsf.com

August Hall is a music venue located at 420 Mason Street in the Tenderloin neighborhood of San Francisco, California. It opened in 2017. From 1990 to 2017, the space was Ruby Skye, a popular nightclub.

== Early building history ==
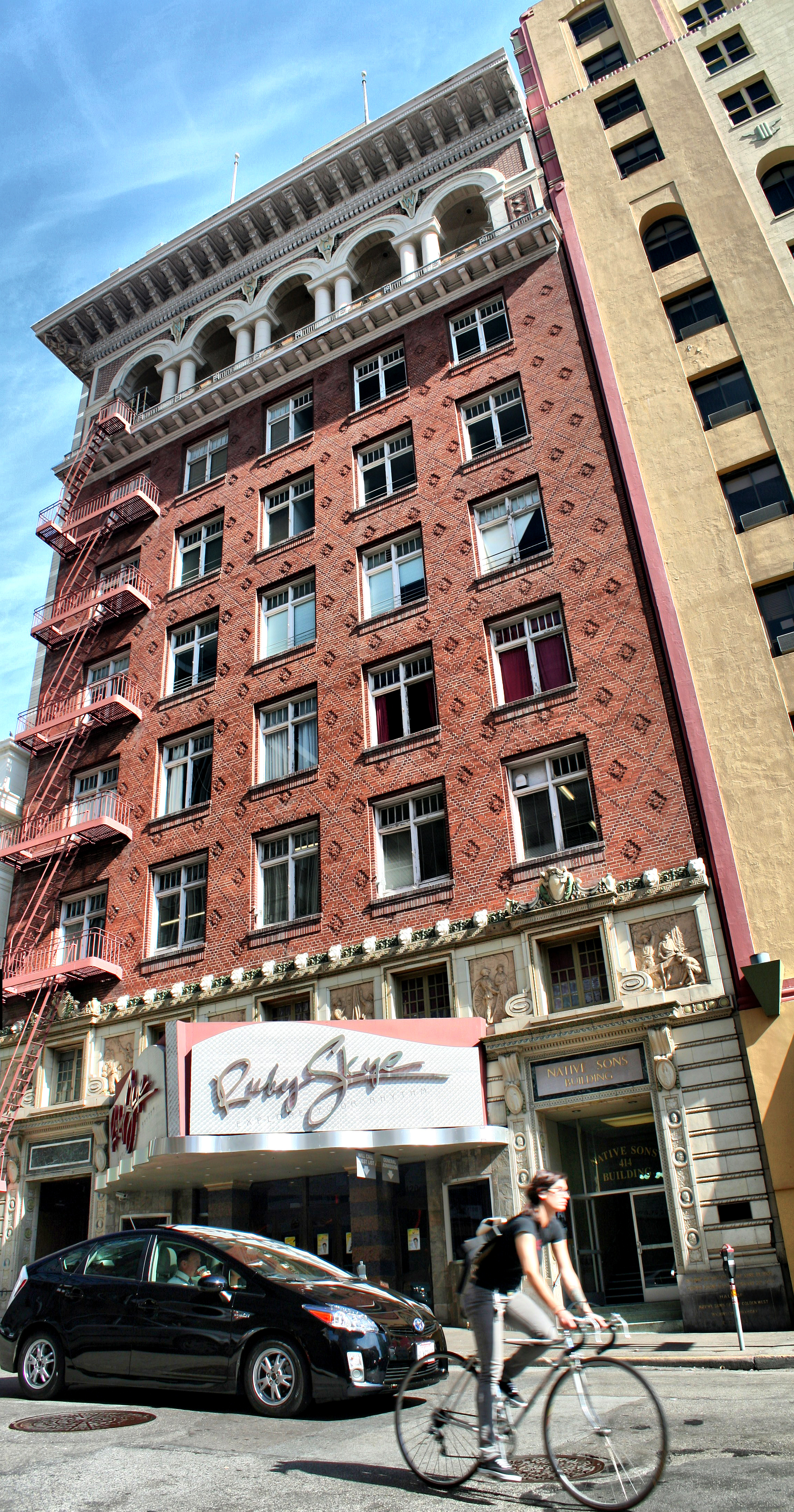
Ruby Skye nightclub building exterior

The building at 420 Mason Street was built in 1912 by architect August Headman for the Native Sons of the Golden West. The venue space was originally an auditorium and meeting hall. In the 1940s it became a USO club and was called the "Stage Door." Later it started showing films as the "Stage Door Theater" and hosted the premiere of the Alfred Hitchcock film Vertigo on May 9, 1958. By the early 1980s, it had become the Regency III movie theater (the Regency I and II were located several blocks away).

In 1989 the theater was renamed the Stage Door Theater while it was used as a temporary home for the ACT theater. ACT's Geary Theater was heavily damaged in the 1989 earthquake and was being restored.

== Ruby Skye history ==
Ruby Skye had a sophisticated sound system with components from Eastern Acoustic Works.

Ruby Skye played host to a long list of DJs, including Above & Beyond, Afrojack, Armin van Buuren, BT, Darude, Deep Dish, John Digweed, Kaskade, Mark Farina, Markus Schulz, Paul Oakenfold, Paul van Dyk, Pete Tong, Roger Sanchez, Sasha, and Tiësto.

It was also a popular location for some of the 106 KMEL House of Soul concerts that the radio station KMEL hosts from time to time.

On March 16, 2017, Ruby Skye announced it would be closing within two months or so after 17 years as a mostly EDM venue. The final event at Ruby Skye took place on Saturday, June 10, 2017, and featured DJ Chuckie with a set called Last Call with Chuckie.

== August Hall history ==
A music venue called August Hall was opened in 2017 by new owner Nate Valentine at the same location as Ruby Skye. It features a restaurant and a few lanes for bowling on the lower level.
