= Russian Roulette (Rihanna song) =

2009 single by Rihanna

Single by Rihanna

from the album Rated R
- Released: October 20, 2009
- Recorded: 2009
- Studio: Roc the Mic (New York City)
- Genre: Pop; pop rock; R&B
- Length: 3:47
- Label: Def Jam; SRP
- Songwriters: Shaffer Smith; Charles Harmon
- Producers: Chuck Harmony; Ne-Yo; Makeba Riddick

Rihanna singles chronology
"Run This Town" (2009)	"Russian Roulette" (2009)	"Hard" (2009)

Music video
- "Russian Roulette" on YouTube

"Russian Roulette" is a song recorded by Barbadian singer Rihanna for her fourth studio album, Rated R (2009). It premiered on radio stations worldwide on October 20, 2009, and was released as the album's lead single on October 26 by Def Jam Recordings. Written and produced by Ne-Yo and Chuck Harmony, "Russian Roulette" is a pop, pop rock and R&B ballad that contains dark, morbid, and tense atmospheric elements in its composition. Lyrically, the single is about an abusive romantic relationship that ended abruptly. Music critics noted the lyrical theme to be a response to the domestic violence case between Rihanna and her former boyfriend, singer and rapper Chris Brown.

"Russian Roulette" received universal acclaim from music critics; with many praising Rihanna's vocal performance and the song's lyrics. It reached the top-ten in over twenty countries worldwide including number one in the Czech Republic, Israel, Luxembourg, Norway, Portugal, Slovakia, and Switzerland. The song reached number two on the UK Singles Chart and number nine on the US Billboard Hot 100 chart. "Russian Roulette" also topped the UK R&B and US Dance Club Songs charts. It was certified two-times platinum by the Recording Industry Association of America (RIAA) denoting sales of over two million copies in the United States alone.

The song's music video was shot by director Anthony Mandler, a frequent collaborator of Rihanna's, and depicts her playing a game of the titular Russian roulette with her love interest played by American actor Jesse Williams. Other scenes include Rihanna in the woods where she is run over by a car, in a gas chamber, in a padded cell, and shots being fired at her underwater. The singer performed "Russian Roulette" on several occasions including on the sixth series of The X Factor, on the Late Show with David Letterman and also included it on the setlist of the Last Girl on Earth Tour (2010–11). English singer George Michael performed a cover of "Russian Roulette" during his Symphonica Tour (2011–12).

== Writing and production ==
Whatever she came with, if she came out with 'I still love you' that would have been about Chris Brown. If she came out with 'I hate your dog' that would have been about Chris Brown, too. It's just a natural reaction for people to associate 'cause she's been so tight-lipped.

— Chuck Harmony talking about the connection between Chris Brown and "Russian Roulette"

In 2009, producer Chuck Harmony and singer-songwriter Ne-Yo convened together to conceptualize a song that would take Rihanna's music to a further level. According to Harmony, they didn't want to re-work the previous works by Rihanna—something that according to him the fans expected. The producer told MTV News that they wanted to give Rihanna a film, not just a song with a length of three minutes, "I felt musically like everybody was gonna give like that 'Disturbia,' 'SOS,' kind of pop, uptempo stuff, and I really wanted the song that me and Ne-Yo did to stand out."

Following a domestic violence case between Rihanna and her boyfriend Chris Brown, media speculated as to whether any song featured on her fourth upcoming album would be about him. In an interview with MTV News, Ne-Yo clarified that he would not write a song for Rihanna about Brown, because he considered the idea unnecessary. Harmony said that no matter what song Rihanna released as a lead single from the album, it would be looked at as a song about Brown.

In an interview with the same publication, Ne-Yo explained how he wrote the lyrics, "I'm listening to the track, and all I can see is Rihanna and some random person sitting across from each other at the table with a gun sitting in the middle of the table and playing Russian roulette." Ne-Yo further stated that Rihanna is not afraid to try new things and from the first moment she heard the song he knew she would like it, "I trust Rihanna to be Rihanna, and she trusts me to be me. That's the coolest thing about our relationship. I must say this song is a step in somewhat of a different direction for both of us." When Harmony heard the song, both he and Ne-Yo were aware that they should change some elements and that it had to be darker and edgier.

"Russian Roulette" was recorded during summer 2009, at the Roc the Mic Studios in New York City by Marcos Tovar and Kevin Hanson served as an assistant. Mykael Alexander was the assistant recorder while Makeba Riddick made the vocal production of the song. Mike "TrakGuru" Johnson recorded the music."Russian Roulette" was mixed by Kevin "KD" Davis together with Jared Newcomb who served as an assistant. Jessie Bonds played the guitars in the song. Harmony explained that after the song was done, Rihanna called Ne-Yo and told him that "Russian Roulette" is one of her favorites, "I think overall she was comfortable with the vibe of the song and comfortable with the lyrical content of the song. She loves the song."

== Release and artwork ==
On October 14, 2009, a metallic "R" along with a message saying "The Wait is Over" was placed on Rihanna's official website. Subsequently, Rihanna posted on her official Twitter profile "#The Wait Is Ova. Nov. 23 09". Speculation rose among fans that "The Wait Is Ova", literally meaning "The wait is over", would either be the name of a new single or the then-upcoming album. According to Entertainment Weekly the date looked accurate for her album release and "The Wait Is Ova" would not be the title of the album. Two days later, a countdown timer appeared on her website and was scheduled to end on October 20, 2009. After the timer finished counting, "Russian Roulette" premiered on BBC Radio 1, the singer's official website and on American radio stations.

Def Jam Recordings serviced the song to contemporary hit radio radio in the United States on October 26, 2009, as the lead single from Rated R. The next day, it was also sent to the rhythmic contemporary and urban contemporary radio stations in the country. In an interview with NME, Rihanna explained that she and her management didn't have doubts if "Russian Roulette" should be the lead single as it was very personal and emotional track to her. On November 3, the single was released for a digital download via the iTunes Store. The album version of "Russian Roulette" together with its instrumental were released as a CD single in Germany on November 13. On December 11, seven remixes of the song were digitally released in some countries.

== Composition and lyrical interpretation ==
'Russian Roulette'
A 22-second sample of "Russian Roulette", a pop, downbeat and R&B ballad that features dark, haunting, morbid, and tense atmospheric elements in the composition.

"Russian Roulette" is a mid-tempo pop, pop-rock and R&B ballad that contains dark, haunting, morbid, and tense atmospheric elements. The song has an instrumentation that features guitars, piano and synths which play over a "heart beat" bass line, accompanied with Rihanna's "affecting" vocals. Eric Henderson of Slant Magazine wrote that the song's production is also features a sound of a rolling dice. According to Jon Pareless of The New York Times, it "is paced by a heartbeat, a ticking clock and Rihanna's fearful voice." "Russian Roulette" is written in the key of F♯ minor, in common time, with a tempo of 83 beats per minute. Rihanna's vocal range spans from F♯_{3} to C_{5}. Chicago Tribune's Greg Kot called the singer's voice a "delicate instrument" that is often the least element in her song's production; however, he noted that on the song "she's squarely in the center of the action".

Lyrically, "Russian Roulette" is about an abusive romantic relationship that ends abruptly, with some critics comparing them to the relationship that Rihanna had with Brown. Kot noted that the single's lyrics compare a relationship to a fatal game of choice, while Andy Jill of The Independent wrote that its title refers to a "state of relationships". Rob Harvilla of The Village Voice described the song as a spare, suspenseful, violent torch song with a literal title. The Los Angeles Times' Todd Martens wrote that although the song's lyrics are vague and find people speculating, they "hint at a situation one probably doesn't want to be in the middle of". Sasha Resende of The Michigan Daily wrote "the ballad, which employs reckless gunplay as a not-so-subtle metaphor for a troubled relationship, achieves its seemingly morbid intent."

"Russian Roulette" begins with a "searing" guitar solo that later transitions into a "pulsing" beat which stays constant until the end of the song. The single opens with the lyrics, "Take a breath/ Take it deep/ Calm yourself/ He says to me/ If you play/ You play for keeps/ Take the gun/ And count to three." The metaphor about the game of Russian roulette is also present in the chorus in which Rihanna sings, "And you can see my heart beating/ You can see it through my chest/ I said I'm terrified, but I'm not leaving/ I know that I must pass this test/ So just pull the trigger." In the upcoming verse, the character that the singer portrays in the song it's scared that the man talking to her will always have power over, "Say a prayer to yourself/ He says close your eyes/ Sometimes it helps/ And then I get a scary thought/ That he's here means he's never lost." "Russian Roulette" ends with a sound of a gunshot, which according to Michaelangelo Matos of The A.V. Club extends the drama accompanied by "harrowing scenarios and tremulous vocals".

== Critical reception ==
Nick Levine of Digital Spy praised "Russian Roulette" and called it a "masterful return effort". He additionally wrote that the single is "brave, brilliantly-realized and bizarre enough to distance" the singer from the other pop or R&B performers like Lady Gaga. According to Levine, the song is her best vocal performances and shows Rihanna growing in front of the audience's eyes. Will Hines of Consequence of Sound called the song a worthy centerpiece and further wrote that it stands out from other tracks on the album which proves that Rated R "was a cathartic process for the singer". Todd Martens of Los Angeles Times wrote that although is hard to imagine the song to be played in a car or a club, it's "attention-grabbing stuff, standing in stark—emphasis on stark—contrast to much of the current pop landscape." Alibhe Malone of NME wrote that Rated R is an album about power and control in which "Russian Roulette" sets the agenda.

The Boston Globe's Sarah Rodman wrote that the song is moody but far too deliberate and "has a grab bag of evocative images but never quite jells". A reviewer of OK! magazine wrote that the single represents a downbeat way for return to the charts for Rihanna, but can grow on you. Andy Jill of The Independent stated that "Russian Roulette" and "Fire Bomb" have "inflammatory" titles. Entertainment Weekly's Simon Vozick-Levinson wrote that although Rihanna took risk with releasing the song, it pays off, "Rihanna is in fine vocal form throughout, and Ne-Yo's songwriting is economical and evocative per usual." A staff from MTV Newsroom thought that the single retains some sort of attitude and atmosphere that made Rihanna "such a definitive artist". Jody Rosen of Rolling Stone concluded that works like "Russian Roulette", "a domestic-violence victim's confession whipped into soaring melodrama — tell us why: She was busy saying her piece in the studio."

Andy Kellman of AllMusic stated that in the song Rihanna had a sudden desire to provoke even if that is in metaphorical context. Pitchfork Media's Ryan Dombal concluded that the single is a bad Celine Dion song with "barrel-turning revolver noises that actually sound like a can of spray paint being shook up". Rob Harvilla of The Village Voice stated that "Russian Roulette"'s composition, makes the song unpleasant for listening. Chris Richards of The Washington Post wrote that the song has "plodding beat" and "forgettable hook" and additionally criticized the ending of the song with a sound of gunshot; according to him that's an attempt to "salvage its wasted potential".

== Chart performance ==
"Russian Roulette" debuted at number 100 on the US Billboard Hot 100 chart in the issue dated November 7, 2009. The next week the song reached a new peak of 75. In its first week of digital release, "Russian Roulette" sold 132,000 copies and moved from 75 to number nine; it became Rihanna's twelfth top-ten single on the chart and made her the female artist of the 2000s decade with the second most top-ten songs only behind Beyoncé. Also, subsequently debuted at number nine on the US Digital Songs chart. On the Pop Songs chart, the single debuted at number 36 and moved to 35 the next week with audience over 29 million audience impressions on the radio. In its third week, the song reached its peak of 21 on the chart. Additionally, it peaked at number 49 on the US Hot R&B/Hip-Hop Songs chart. In the US, "Russian Roulette" was most successful on the Hot Dance Club Songs chart where it peaked at number one in its seventh week for the issue dated February 20, 2010. It was certified two-times platinum by the Recording Industry Association of America (RIAA) denoting sales of over two million digital copies in the US alone. "Russian Roulette" also peaked at number nine on the Canadian Hot 100.

"Russian Roulette" entered the New Zealand Singles Chart at number 19 on November 9, 2009, climbing into the top ten the following week at number nine. After fluctuating around the top ten marks over the following three weeks, it regained its peak position on December 14, 2009. It remained on the chart for 12 weeks, earning a Gold certification from the Recording Industry Association of New Zealand. "Russian Roulette" debuted on the Australian Singles Chart, at number 11 on November 16, 2009. The following week it climbed to its peak of number seven. It remained in the top ten for three consecutive weeks and 12 weeks on the chart in total. It has been certified double platinum by the Australian Recording Industry Association (ARIA) denoting 140,000 equivalent units.

"Russian Roulette" entered the UK Singles Chart at number six on November 29, 2009. The following week, it rose to its peak of number two, giving Rihanna her eleventh top five single in the country. Simultaneously, it peaked at number one on the UK R&B Chart and remained at the top for three consecutive weeks. It was certified Silver in the United Kingdom on February 12, 2010, after selling 200,000 copies. As of August 2011, the single has sold over 360,000 copies in the United Kingdom. Elsewhere in Europe, the song managed to top the charts in Norway, Slovakia, and Switzerland, and attained top five positions in Austria, Belgium, Finland, France, Germany, Hungary, Ireland, Scotland and Sweden. It also reached the top ten in Denmark, Italy and Spain.

== Music video ==
=== Background and synopsis ===
Rihanna and actor Jesse Williams playing Russian roulette in the music video for the song

The music video for "Russian Roulette" was directed by Rihanna's frequent collaborator Anthony Mandler, who directed Rihanna's previous videos for "Take a Bow", "Disturbia", "Rehab" and "Wait Your Turn". It was filmed in two days on October 3–4, 2009 in New York. In November 2009, Rihanna appeared on "TV total" in Germany to talk about her new album and preview 30 seconds of the video for the song. Mandler spoke to MTV News, stating "I think that with this song and the meaning of this song and how loaded it all is, no pun intended, how much imagery and perhaps symbolism that is loaded in this song, the only way to do it was to do something that was visually challenging". The music video for the song premiered on ABC's 20/20 on November 13, 2009.

The music video opens with shots of Rihanna hooded, lying on the floor of a gas chamber. Three men, dressed in black uniforms and wearing dark round glasses circulate the singer, attempting to extort information from her. The scene then moves to a dimly lit room in which Rihanna sits at a table with her love interest (played by American actor Jesse Williams) opposite. On the table between them lies a silver revolver in which, throughout the video, they take it turns holding to their heads. Other scenes include Rihanna in woodland at night standing in the middle of a highway before a car speeds towards her, quickly cutting to another scene, giving the impression she is run over. Elements of blood and tears and vehicular assault dominate the video. In the final scenes, Rihanna is shown underwater, floating while being fired at; one bullet is visually seen cutting her throat. The video ends with her lover committing suicide with the revolver placed between them.

=== Reception ===
James Montgomery of MTV reviewed the video stating:,"There's seemingly no bottom to the inky depths Rihanna plumbs in her brand-new 'Russian Roulette' video, a dark, claustrophobic descent that's creepier than anything she's ever done before (including the 'Disturbia' video)". Katy Hall from The Huffington Post commented that the video comes from a pretty dark place and tells more depressing story than Gaga's video for "Bad Romance". According to Daniel Kreps from Rolling Stone, there is a lot of imagery that is influenced by the altercation of Rihanna and Brown from February 2009, including a speeding car that approaches Rihanna while she stands alone at night – "a moment that seems to mirror the events immediately following the assault". Megan Masters from E! Online commented that the video "portrays "some seemingly real emotion with her bouncing back-and-forth between writhing around a padded cell." Simon Vozick-Levinson from Entertainment Weekly supported the dark imagery used in the video, explaining, "What, you thought Rihanna was going to give 'Russian Roulette' a video full of sunshine and rainbows and peppy choreography? Her first single from Rated R is a song about violence".

== Live performances and cover ==
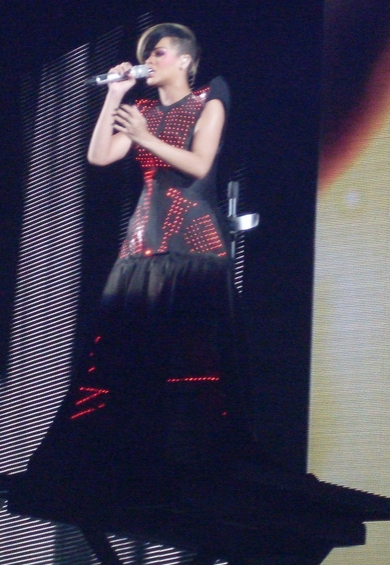
Rihanna performing "Russian Roulette" on the Last Girl on Earth Tour in Antwerp

Following the release of Rated R in the United Kingdom, Rihanna performed the song for the first time at the Nokia promotional concert at Brixton Academy in London. Rihanna performed the song as part of a setlist, which included "Wait Your Turn" and "Hard". She sang "Russian Roulette" while sitting on a throne chair. A reviewer from British MTV stated that "The Barbadian beauty then sat seductively on stage in a throne that even the Beckhams would be proud of to belt out the ballad".

Rihanna performed "Russian Roulette", together with "Wait Your Turn", "Hard" and "Umbrella" on Good Morning America as part of the fall concert series in New York City. The next day, she performed the song on the Late Show with David Letterman. On November 29, 2009, Rihanna sang "Russian Roulette" on the series six of The X Factor in the United Kingdom. On December 5, Rihanna was a musical guest on Saturday Night Live where she performed both, "Russian Roulette" and "Hard". In February 2010, Rihanna recorded Sessions@AOL, where she performed the song, alongside "Hard", "Rude Boy", "Disturbia", and "Take a Bow".

"Russian Roulette" was the opening song on Rihanna's setlist for her Last Girl on Earth tour (2010–11). She performed the song on a movable platform while wearing a floor-length gown covered with red LED lights. Neil McCormick of The Telegraph, in a review of the Birmingham concert, said, "She kicked off with the homicidal pop-rock ballad Russian Roulette to screen imagery of burning naked mannequins and had shed most of her clothes by her second song...". Later the track was excluded from the setlist for the Australian leg of the tour, together with "Rehab", and was replaced with "Only Girl (In the World)" as the tour opener. English singer George Michael covered "Russian Roulette" during his orchestral concert tour, titled the Symphonica Tour (2011–12).

== Formats and track listing ==
Digital download

1. "Russian Roulette" – 3:48

Promo, French, German, and UK CD

1. "Russian Roulette" – 3:49
2. "Russian Roulette" (instrumental) – 3:48

Digital download (the remixes)

1. "Russian Roulette" (Tony Moran and Warren Rig radio mix) – 4:25
2. "Russian Roulette" (Chew Fu "Black Russian" fix; radio) – 3:48
3. "Russian Roulette" (Tony Moran and Warren Rig pounding club remix) – 10:26
4. "Russian Roulette" (Chew Fu "Black Russian" fix; extended) – 6:01
5. "Russian Roulette" (Tony Moran, Warren Rig, Dave Saronson pounding dub mix) – 11:14
6. "Russian Roulette" (Chew Fu "Black Russian" fix; dub) – 4:54
7. "Russian Roulette" (Chew Fu "Aciiid" fix; dub reprise) – 6:00

== Personnel ==
Locations

- Recorded at Roc the Mic Studios, New York City, New York; mixed at Chung King Studios, New York City, New York.

Personnel

- Songwriting – Shaffer Smith, Charles Harmon
- Production – Ne-Yo, Chuck Harmony
- Vocal production – Makeba Riddick
- Recording – Marcos Tovar
- Assistant recorder – Mykael Alexander
- Music recorder – Mike "TrakGuru" Johnson
- Assistant music recorder – Kevin Hanson
- Mixing – Kevin "KD" Davis
- Assistant mixer – Jared Newcomb
- Guitar – Jessie Bonds

Credits adapted from the liner notes of Rated R, Def Jam Recordings, SRP.

== Charts ==
=== Weekly charts ===
Weekly chart performance
Chart (2009–2010)	Peak position
Australia (ARIA)	7
Austria (Ö3 Austria Top 40)	2
Belgium (Ultratop 50 Flanders)	5
Belgium (Ultratop 50 Wallonia)	3
Canada Hot 100 (Billboard)	9
CIS Airplay (TopHit)	11
Croatia International Airplay (HRT)	2
Czech Republic Airplay (ČNS IFPI)	1
Denmark (Tracklisten)	6
Europe (European Hot 100 Singles)	2
Finland (Suomen virallinen lista)	3
France (SNEP)	4
Germany (GfK)	2
Hungary (Single Top 40)	4
Ireland (IRMA)	5
Israel International Airplay (Media Forest)	1
Italy (FIMI)	6
Japan Hot 100 (Billboard)	72
Luxembourg (Billboard)	1
Mexico (Billboard Mexican Airplay)	4
Netherlands (Dutch Top 40)	7
Netherlands (Single Top 100)	15
New Zealand (Recorded Music NZ)	9
Norway (VG-lista)	1
Portugal (Billboard)	4
Romania Airplay (Media Forest)	1
Russia Airplay (TopHit)	11
Scottish Singles Sales (Official Charts)	3
Slovakia Airplay (ČNS IFPI)	1
Spain (Promusicae)	6
Sweden (Sverigetopplistan)	4
Switzerland (Schweizer Hitparade)	1
UK Singles (Official Charts)	2
UK Hip Hop/R&B (Official Charts)	1
US Billboard Hot 100	9
US Dance Club Songs (Billboard)	1
US Hot R&B/Hip-Hop Songs (Billboard)	49
US Pop Airplay (Billboard)	21
US Rhythmic Airplay (Billboard)	22

=== Year-end charts ===
2009 year-end chart performance
Chart (2009)	Position
Australia (ARIA)	96
Austria (Ö3 Austria Top 40)	60
Belgium (Ultratop 50 Flanders)	97
CIS (TopHit)	168
France (SNEP)	50
Germany (Official German Charts)	64
Hungary (Mahasz)	100
Italy (FIMI)	35
Netherlands (Dutch Top 40)	98
Russia Airplay (TopHit)	155
Sweden (Sverigetopplistan)	92
Switzerland (Schweizer Hitparade)	61
UK Singles (OCC)	72

2010 year-end chart performance
Chart (2010)	Position
Austria (Ö3 Austria Top 40)	46
Belgium (Ultratop 50 Flanders)	100
Belgium (Ultratop 50 Wallonia)	31
Brazil (Crowley)	26
CIS (TopHit)	48
Croatia International Airplay (HRT)	72
European Hot 100 Singles	9
France (SNEP)	36
Germany (Official German Charts)	59
Italy (FIMI)	94
Netherlands (Dutch Top 40)	76
Romania (Romanian Top 100)	29
Russia Airplay (TopHit)	65
Spain (PROMUSICAE)	33
Sweden (Sverigetopplistan)	69
Switzerland (Schweizer Hitparade)	33
UK Singles (OCC)	130
US Dance Club Songs (Billboard)	49

== Certifications and sales ==
Certifications and sales
Region	Certification	Certified units/sales
Australia (ARIA)	2× Platinum	140,000^{‡}
Denmark (IFPI Danmark)	Gold	15,000^{^}
France	—	135,000
Germany (BVMI)	Gold	150,000^{‡}
Italy (FIMI)	Platinum	30,000^{*}
New Zealand (RMNZ)	Gold	7,500^{*}
Spain (Promusicae)	Gold	20,000^{*}
Sweden (GLF)	Platinum	20,000^{‡}
Switzerland (IFPI Switzerland)	Gold	15,000^{^}
United Kingdom (BPI)	Platinum	600,000^{‡}
United States (RIAA)	2× Platinum	2,000,000^{‡}
^{*} Sales figures based on certification alone.^{^} Shipments figures based on certification alone.^{‡} Sales+streaming figures based on certification alone.

== Release history ==
Release dates and formats
Region	Date	Format(s)	Version(s)	Label	Ref.
Worldwide	October 20, 2009	Radio premiere	Original	Def Jam	
United States	October 26, 2009	Contemporary hit radio	Original	Def Jam	
United States	October 27, 2009	Rhythmic contemporary radio; urban contemporary radio	Original	Def Jam	
Denmark	October 30, 2009	Digital download	Original	Def Jam	
Finland	October 30, 2009	Digital download	Original	Def Jam	
Italy	October 30, 2009	Digital download	Original	Def Jam	
Japan	October 30, 2009	Digital download	Original	Def Jam	
Netherlands	October 30, 2009	Digital download	Original	Def Jam	
New Zealand	October 30, 2009	Digital download	Original	Def Jam	
Norway	October 30, 2009	Digital download	Original	Def Jam	
Australia	November 3, 2009	Digital download	Original	Def Jam	
France	November 3, 2009	Digital download	Original	Def Jam	
Ireland	November 3, 2009	Digital download	Original	Def Jam	
Portugal	November 3, 2009	Digital download	Original	Def Jam	
Spain	November 3, 2009	Digital download	Original	Def Jam	
Sweden	November 3, 2009	Digital download	Original	Def Jam	
United Kingdom	November 3, 2009	Digital download	Original	Def Jam	
France	November 13, 2009	CD	Original; instrumental	Universal	
Germany	November 13, 2009	CD	Original; instrumental	Universal	
Denmark	December 14, 2009	Digital download	The remixes	Def Jam	
Finland	December 14, 2009	Digital download	The remixes	Def Jam	
Netherlands	December 14, 2009	Digital download	The remixes	Def Jam	
Norway	December 14, 2009	Digital download	The remixes	Def Jam	
Portugal	December 14, 2009	Digital download	The remixes	Def Jam	
Spain	December 14, 2009	Digital download	The remixes	Def Jam	
Sweden	December 14, 2009	Digital download	The remixes	Def Jam	

== See also ==
- List of number-one songs in Norway
- List of number-one hits of 2010 (Switzerland)
- List of UK R&B Singles Chart number ones of 2009
- List of Billboard Hot Dance Club Songs number ones of 2010
