= 2006 World Music Awards =

18th award event

The 2006 (18th annual) World Music Awards were held in London, England and hosted by Lindsay Lohan on 15 November 2006.

Performances included a "Thriller" recreation by Chris Brown and a children's chorus rendition of "We Are the World" with Michael Jackson. The latter would end up being Jackson's final live performance (in fact, it was more a participation). Other performers included Andrea Bocelli, Beyoncé, Bob Sinclar, Dima Bilan, Elissa, Enya, Faithless, Katie Melua, Nelly Furtado, Rihanna, Tokio Hotel, and Suleman Mirza.

Presenters included Pamela Anderson, Natalie Imbruglia, Donatella Versace, Sugababes, Nicole Richie, Denise Richards and Brian McFadden.

The World Music Awards ceremony was televised in 160 countries including the United States, Canada, Europe, Australia, Japan, Southeast Asia, China, Africa and the Middle East. In the United Kingdom it was broadcast on Channel 4 on 23 November 2006. In the U.S., ABC is the traditional home of the World Music Awards, but in recent years they have moved to MyNetworkTV, which rebroadcast the 2006 show on 1 July 2009, due to that show's tributes to the recently deceased Michael Jackson.

== Diamond Award ==
The Diamond Award honors those recording-artists who have sold over 100 million albums during their career. Past recipients include Mariah Carey, Celine Dion, Rod Stewart and Bon Jovi. This year's recipient was Michael Jackson (awarded by Beyoncé). His most popular album "Thriller" has sold more than 104 million copies worldwide since its release in 1982, making it the best-selling album of all time.

== Legend Award ==
- For Outstanding Contribution to R&B Music: Mary J. Blige

== Winners ==
=== Classical ===
- World's Best-Selling Classical Artist: Andrea Bocelli

=== DJ ===
- World's Best-Selling DJ: Bob Sinclar
  - Runners-up: Paul Oakenfold, Fatboy Slim, Shapeshifters and Deep Dish

=== Latin ===
- World's Best-Selling Latin Artist: Shakira
  - Runners-up: Daddy Yankee, RBD, Mana and Juanes

=== New ===
- World's Best-Selling New Artist: James Blunt
  - Runners-up: Carrie Underwood, Pussycat Dolls, KT Tunstall and Gnarls Barkley

=== Pop ===
- World's Best-Selling Pop Artist: Madonna
  - Runners-up: Robbie Williams, James Blunt, Shakira and Justin Timberlake

=== Pop Rock ===
- World's Best-Selling Pop Rock Artist: Nelly Furtado
  - Runners-up: KT Tunstall, Pink, Gwen Stefani and John Mayer

=== R&B ===
- World's Best-Selling R&B Artist: Beyoncé
  - Runners-up: Mary J Blige, Rihanna, Jamie Foxx and Chris Brown

=== Rap Hip Hop ===
- World's Best-Selling Rap Hip Hop Artist: Kanye West
  - Runners-up: Sean Paul, T.I., Busta Rhymes and Chamillionaire

=== Rock ===
- World's Best-Selling Rock Artist: Nickelback
  - Runners-up: Coldplay, Red Hot Chili Peppers, Green Day and Keane

=== Regional Awards ===
- Best-Selling Arabic Artist: Elissa
- Best-Selling Barbadian Artist: Rihanna
- Best-Selling Chinese Artist: Jay Chou
- Best-Selling German Artist: Tokio Hotel
- Best-Selling Irish Artist: Enya
- Best-Selling Italian Artist: Andrea Bocelli
- Best-Selling Russian Artist: Dima Bilan
- Best-Selling UK Artist: James Blunt
- Best-Selling US Artist: Madonna
