= Alexis Jordan discography =

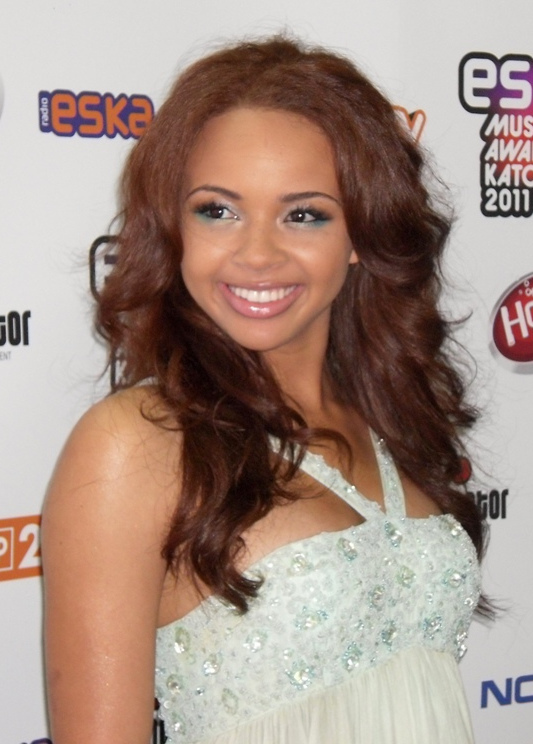
- Studio albums: 1
- Singles: 6
- Music videos: 5
- Promotional singles: 2
- Featured singles: 1

The discography of American singer Alexis Jordan consists of one studio album, six singles (including one as a featured artist) and five music videos.

Jordan rose to fame when she finished as a semi-finalist on the first season of America's Got Talent in 2006. After being eliminated from the show, Jordan and her family moved to Mexico to be closer to the music industry. While there, she began to upload cover songs on YouTube while submitting demos. By 2008, Jordan's YouTube page was racking up millions of views. The exposure led Jordan to the attention of production team Stargate, who called her to fly to New York and record a few songs with them. While in the studio, rapper Jay-Z walked in, which ultimately resulted in Jordan becoming the first artist signed to the new, Sony Music-affiliated label, StarRoc/Roc Nation – a joint venture between Stargate and Jay-Z's Roc Nation label. Her debut single "Happiness" was released in September 2010 and topped the Hot Dance Club Songs chart in the United States and became a top-three hit in the United Kingdom and Australia. In Australia, "Happiness" was certified triple platinum by the Australian Recording Industry Association (ARIA), for shipments of 210,000 copies.

"Good Girl" was released as Jordan's second single in February 2011. The song debuted at No. 6 on the UK Singles Chart, giving Jordan her second top-10 hit in the United Kingdom. It also reached No. 15 in Ireland and became her second chart-topper on the Billboard Hot Dance Club Songs chart in April. Her self-titled debut album was released on February 25, 2011. It debuted on the UK Albums Chart at No. 9 and on the Australian Albums Chart at No. 11. "Hush Hush" was released as the album's third single on May 8, 2011.

Jordan also featured on Sean Paul's single "Got 2 Luv U", which reached number one in Switzerland and Bulgaria.

On December 28, 2013, Alexis confirmed that the lead single from her then-upcoming second studio album would be titled "Gone" and it would be released on March 1, 2014. Its video premiered the day before on Jordan's official YouTube channel.

== Albums ==
List of albums, with selected chart positions
Title	Album details	Peak chart positions						Certifications
Title	Album details	AUS	BEL (FL)	IRE	NLD	SWI	UK	Certifications
Alexis Jordan	Released: February 25, 2011; Label: StarRoc, Roc Nation, Columbia; Formats: CD, digital download	11	87	28	21	96	9	BPI: Silver

== Singles ==
List of singles, with selected chart positions
Title	Year	Peak chart positions										Certifications	Album
Title	Year	US Dance	AUS	BEL (FL)	IRE	NL	NOR	NZ	POL	SWI	UK	Certifications	Album
"Happiness"	2010	1	3	3	31	1	1	8	2	44	3	ARIA: 3× Platinum; BEA: Gold; BPI: Platinum; RMNZ: Platinum	Alexis Jordan
"Good Girl"	2011	1	40	9	15	25	—	—	42	—	6	BPI: Silver	Alexis Jordan
"Hush Hush"	2011	—	—	55	36	12	—	—	50	—	66		Alexis Jordan
"Acid Rain"	2013	1	—	55	—	88	—	—	35	—	—		Non-album singles
"Gone"	2014	—	—	—	—	—	—	—	—	—	—		Non-album singles

=== As featured artist ===
List of featured singles, with selected chart positions
Title	Year	Peak chart positions									Certifications	Album
Title	Year	US	AUS	AUT	BEL (FL)	BEL (WA)	FRA	NL	SWI	UK	Certifications	Album
"Got 2 Luv U" (Sean Paul featuring Alexis Jordan)	2011	84	26	1	3	7	1	3	1	11	IFPI AUT: Gold; ARIA: Platinum; BPI: Platinum; BVMI: Gold; IFPI SWI: Platinum; RMNZ: Gold	Tomahawk Technique

=== Guest appearances ===
Year	Title	Album	Artist	Ref.
2010	"Together"	Third Strike	Tinchy Stryder	

== Music videos ==
Year	Title	Director(s)	Ref.	Description
2010	"Happiness"	Aggressive		The music video for "Happiness" was directed by Aggressive and premiered online on May 20, 2010.
2011	"Good Girl"	Erik White		The music video was directed by Erik White, it premiered on 25 January 2011 and was filmed late December 2010. The video commences with Jordan walking down a street wearing sunglasses.
2011	"Hush Hush"	Clifton Bell		The music video for the song was uploaded to YouTube on 6 May 2011 and lasts four minutes and six seconds. The music video was directed by Clifton Bell.
2011	"Got 2 Luv U"	Ben Mor		The video was filmed on August 29, 2011, at the Hard Rock Cafe in Las Vegas and the Vanity Nightclub that is under the same ownership as the Hard Rock Cafe hotel. The music video was uploaded to YouTube on 15 September 2011 at a total length of three minutes and thirty-four seconds. It was directed by Ben Mor.
2011	"Say That"			
2013	"Laying Around"	Reese Davis		The music video for the song was uploaded to YouTube on Jun 12, 2013 and lasts four minutes and one second. The music video was directed by Reese Davis.
2014	"Gone"			
