= Stargate production discography =

Projects supervised by Norwegian duo

This is a list of songs written and/or produced by the Norwegian production team Stargate.

== Produced singles ==
Year	Song (Artist)	Chart positions								Album
Year	Song (Artist)	US	UK	AUS	CAN	IRL	NZ	GER	FRA	Album
1999	"S Club Party" (S Club 7)	NR	2	2	NR	9	1	NR	NR	S Club
1999	"Two in a Million" (S Club 7)	NR	2	23	NR	8	1	NR	NR	S Club
1999	"Still Believe" (Shola Ama)	NR	NR	NR	NR	NR	NR	NR	NR	In Return
2000	"Hottie" (Ashley Ballard)	39	NR	NR	NR	NR	NR	NR	NR	Get in the Booth
2000	"Day & Night" (Billie Piper)	NR	1	8	NR	13	6	NR	NR	Walk of Life
2000	"Mama - Who Da Man" (Richard Blackwood)	NR	3	NR	NR	NR	NR	NR	NR	You'll Love to Hate This
2000	"Sweet Love 2K" (Fierce)	NR	3	NR	NR	NR	NR	NR	NR	Right Here, Right Now
2001	"The Way To Your Love" (Hear'Say)	NR	1	NR	NR	NR	NR	NR	NR	Popstars
2001	"Another Day in Paradise (Remix)" (Brandy featuring Ray J)	NR	5	11	NR	4	29	2	11	Full Moon
2001	"Always Come Back to Your Love" (Samantha Mumba)	NR	3	63	NR	1	43	NR	NR	Gotta Tell You
2001	"All Rise" (Blue)	NR	4	3	NR	NR	NR	NR	NR	All Rise
2001	"One Night Stand (Stargate Radio Edit)" (Mis-Teeq)	NR	5	17	NR	12	16	57	46	Lickin' on Both Sides
2002	"Fly By II" (Blue)	NR	6	26	NR	NR	NR	NR	NR	All Rise
2002	"Street Life" (Beenie Man)	NR	13	NR	NR	NR	NR	NR	NR	Tropical Storm
2002	"It's OK!" (Atomic Kitten)	NR	3	24	NR	7	16	18	37	Feels So Good
2002	"One Love" (Blue)	NR	3	36	NR	4	5	54	36	One Love
2002	"The Last Goodbye" (Atomic Kitten)	NR	2	NR	NR	5	11	28	NR	Feels So Good
2002	"Sorry Seems to Be the Hardest Word" (Blue)	NR	1	43	NR	3	5	3	6	One Love
2003	"U Make Me Wanna" (Blue)	NR	4	NR	NR	5	20	6	NR	One Love
2003	"Scandalous" (Mis-Teeq)	35	2	9	—	3	4	59	27	Eye Candy
2003	"Real Things" (Javine)	NR	4	NR	NR	NR	NR	NR	NR	Surrender
2003	"Surrender (Your Love)" (Javine)	NR	15	NR	NR	NR	NR	NR	NR	Surrender
2003	"Style" (Mis-Teeq)	NR	13	NR	NR	NR	NR	NR	NR	Eye Candy
2004	"Eyes On You" (Jay Sean)	NR	6	—	NR	—	—	—	—	Me Against Myself
2004	"Don't Walk Away" (Javine)	NR	16	NR	NR	NR	NR	NR	NR	Surrender
2004	"Stolen" (Jay Sean)	NR	4	—	NR	—	—	—	—	Me Against Myself
2004	"Curtain Falls" (Blue)	NR	4	NR	NR	10	NR	8	18	Best of Blue
2006	"So Sick" (Ne-Yo)	1	1	4	1	2	2	11	11	In My Own Words
2006	"Sexy Love" (Ne-Yo)	7	5	14	—	—	8	—	54	In My Own Words
2006	"Unfaithful" (Rihanna)	6	2	2	1	2	4	2	7	A Girl Like Me
2006	"Walk Away (Remember Me)" (Paula DeAnda featuring The D.E.Y.)	18	60	—	—	—	—	—	—	Paula DeAnda
2006	"I Call It Love" (Lionel Richie)	62	45	—	—	—	—	33	29	Coming Home
2006	"We Ride" (Rihanna)	—	17	24	—	17	7	45	—	A Girl Like Me
2006	"Irreplaceable" (Beyoncé)	1	4	1	1	1	1	11	10	B'Day
2006	"I Belong to Me" (Jessica Simpson)	10								A Public Affair
2007	"Beautiful Liar" (Beyoncé & Shakira)	3	1	5	2	1	1	1	1	
2007	"Wait for You" (Elliott Yamin)	13	—	—	22	—	—	—	—	Elliott Yamin
2007	"Because of You" (Ne-Yo)	2	4	23	40	10	1	30	25	Because Of You
2007	"Gallery" (Mario Vazquez)	35	—	42	—	—	—	—	15	Mario Vazquez
2007	"Don't Stop the Music" (Rihanna)	3	4	1	2	3	3	1	1	Good Girl Gone Bad
2007	"Hate That I Love You" (Rihanna featuring Ne-Yo)	7	15	14	17	13	6	11	16	Good Girl Gone Bad
2007	"Can't Help but Wait" (Trey Songz)	14	—	—	—	—	—	—	—	Trey Day
2007	"Tattoo" (Jordin Sparks)	8	22	5	2	48	12	19	—	Jordin Sparks
2007	"With You" (Chris Brown)	2	8	5	2	3	1	20	11	Exclusive
2007	"Go On Girl" (Ne-Yo)	96	27	—	—	—	—	—	—	Because Of You
2008	"Take a Bow" (Rihanna)	1	1	3	1	1	2	6	12	Good Girl Gone Bad: Reloaded
2008	"Closer" (Ne-Yo)	7	1	8	19	3	3	4	—	Year of the Gentleman
2008	"Bye Bye" (Mariah Carey)	19	30	—	34	40	7	70	—	E=MC^{2}
2008	"Bossy" (Lindsay Lohan)	—	—	—	77	—	—	—	—	-
2008	"Spotlight" (Jennifer Hudson)	24	11	73	69	32	21	58	—	Jennifer Hudson
2008	"Miss Independent" (Ne-Yo)	7	6	40	21	9	4	—	16	Year of the Gentleman
2008	"Mad" (Ne-Yo)	11	19	86	30	30	5	—	—	Year of the Gentleman
2009	"Come Back to Me" (Utada)	—	—	—	—	—	—	—	—	This Is the One
2009	"I Need A Girl" (Trey Songz)	59	—	—	—	—	—	—	—	Ready
2009	"Be on You" (Flo Rida featuring Ne-Yo)	19	51	—	61	—	—	—	—	R.O.O.T.S.
2009	"Broken-Hearted Girl" (Beyoncé)	—	27	14	—	20	—	14	—	I Am... Sasha Fierce
2009	"Wait Your Turn" (Rihanna)	—	45	82	—	32	—	—	—	Rated R
2009	"I Am" (Mary J. Blige)	55	34	—	96	—	—	—	—	Stronger with Each Tear
2010	"Rude Boy" (Rihanna)	1	2	1	7	3	3	4	8	Rated R
2010	"Love Dealer" (Esmée Denters featuring Justin Timberlake)	—	68	—	—	—	—	—	—	Outta Here
2010	"Te Amo" (Rihanna)	—	14	22	66	19	—	11	—	Rated R
2010	"Beautiful Monster" (Ne-Yo)	53	1	98	40	9	20	13	—	Libra Scale
2010	"Letting Go (Dutty Love)" (Sean Kingston featuring Nicki Minaj)	36	—	—	35	—	23	—	—	Dumb Love
2010	"Grown Woman" (Kelly Rowland)	—	—	—	—	—	—	—	—	Here I Am
2010	"Black and Yellow" (Wiz Khalifa)	1	5	24	7	14	21	—	38	Rolling Papers
2010	"Happiness" (Alexis Jordan)	—	3	3	—	31	8	—	—	Alexis Jordan
2010	"Only Girl (In the World)" (Rihanna)	1	1	1	1	1	1	2	2	Loud
2010	"Firework" (Katy Perry)	1	3	3	1	2	1	4	7	Teenage Dream
2010	"What's My Name?" (Rihanna featuring Drake)	1	1	18	5	3	3	12	16	Loud
2010	"Party All Night (Sleep All Day)" (Sean Kingston)	—	9	—	—	25	—	—	—	-
2011	"S&M" (Rihanna)	1	3	1	1	3	2	2	3	Loud
2011	"Good Girl" (Alexis Jordan)	—	6	40	—	15	—	—	—	Alexis Jordan
2011	"One" (Jasmine)	—	—	—	—	—	—	—	—	Complexxx
2011	"Roll Up" (Wiz Khalifa)	13	42	—	56	49	—	—	60	Rolling Papers
2011	"I'm Into You" (Jennifer Lopez featuring Lil Wayne)	41	9	45	55	25	—	16	38	Love?
2011	"Lose Control / Let Me Down" (Keri Hilson featuring Nelly)	—	—	—	—	—	36	—	—	No Boys Allowed
2011	"Hush Hush" (Alexis Jordan)	—	66	—	—	43	—	—	—	Alexis Jordan
2011	"Till I'm Gone" (Tinie Tempah featuring Wiz Khalifa)	90	24	—	—	32	—	—	—	Disc-Overy
2011	"Got 2 Luv U" (Sean Paul featuring Alexis Jordan)	84	11	28	69	—	—	3	4	Tomahawk Technique
2011	"Radioactive" (Marina and the Diamonds)	—	25	—	—	37	—	—	—	Electra Heart
2012	"She Doesn't Mind" (Sean Paul)	78	2	45	49	10	—	2	3	Tomahawk Technique
2012	"R.I.P." (Rita Ora featuring Tinie Tempah)	106	1	10	—	11	28	36	—	Ora
2012	"Hello" (Karmin)	62	—	72	72	—	21	—	—	Hello
2012	"Let Me Love You (Until You Learn to Love Yourself)" (Ne-Yo)	6	1	8	13	5	21	61	46	R.E.D.
2012	"Diamonds" (Rihanna)	1	1	6	3	2	3	1	1	Unapologetic
2013	"Almost Home" (Mariah Carey)	—	—	—	—	—	—	—	174	Oz the Great and Powerful#Soundtrack
2013	"Come & Get It" (Selena Gomez)	6	8	46	6	6	14	58	34	Stars Dance
2013	"Girlfriend" (Icona Pop)									
2013	"Just Another Night" (Icona Pop)									
2013	"Compass" (Lady Antebellum)	46	—	—	51	—	—	—	—	Golden
2013	"The Fox" (Ylvis)	8	65	36	—	83	24	—	—	Unknown
2013	"Cannonball" (Lea Michele)	78	56	45	49	80	—	—	48	Louder
2014	"Wait on Me" (Rixton)	—	12	—	—	62	—	—	—	Let the Road
2014	"Black Widow" (Iggy Azalea featuring Rita Ora)	3	4	15	6	9	11	39	9	The New Classic
2014	"Body Language" (Kid Ink featuring Usher and Tinashe)	72	46	—	—	62	—	53	104	Full Speed
2014	"Break the Rules" (Charli XCX)	91	35	10	69	46	31	4	13	Sucker
2015	"Drop That Kitty" (Ty Dolla Sign featuring Charli XCX and Tinashe)	—	—	—	—	—	—	—	198	Unknown
2015	"Feel the Light" (Jennifer Lopez)	—	—	—	—	—	—	—	—	Home: Original Motion Picture Soundtrack
2015	"Dancing in the Dark" (Rihanna)	—	—	—	—	—	—	—	92	Home: Original Motion Picture Soundtrack
2015	"Coming with You" (Ne-Yo)	—	14	—	—	—	—	—	—	Non-Fiction
2015	"Worth It" (Fifth Harmony featuring Kid Ink)	12	3	9	12	23	31	16	15	Reflection
2015	"Same Old Love" (Selena Gomez)	5	81	33	6	72	—	56	26	Revival
2015	"Adventure of a Lifetime" (Coldplay)	13	7	20	11	8	12	5	2	A Head Full of Dreams
2015	"Touch" (Pia Mia)	—	—	47	—	83	—	—	—	-
2015	"Every Day's Like Christmas" (Kylie Minogue)	—	—	—	—	—	—	—	—	Kylie Christmas
2016	"Try Everything" (Shakira)	63	186	57	49	—	—	54	43	Zootopia (Original Motion Picture Soundtrack)
2016	"Hymn for the Weekend" (Coldplay)	25	6	24	32	7	—	11	3	A Head Full of Dreams
2016	"Up&Up" (Coldplay)	—	71	74	—	95	—	79	161	A Head Full of Dreams
2016	"All in My Head (Flex)" (Fifth Harmony)	24	25	19	21	27	8	—	—	7/27
2017	"After the Afterparty" (Charli XCX featuring Lil Yachty)	—	34	30	—	67	—	—	—	After the Afterparty
2017	"Issues" (Julia Michaels)	11	10	5	17	11	11	29	7	Nervous System
2017	"Run Up" (Major Lazer featuring PartyNextDoor and Nicki Minaj)	66	20	27	20	25	14	22	12	Music Is the Weapon
2017	"No Vacancy" (OneRepublic)	113	—	—	74	74	—	52	108	-
2017	"Too Good at Goodbyes" (Sam Smith)	5	1	1	3	2	1	28	97	The Thrill of It All
2018	"No Drama" (Tinashe featuring Offset)	123	—	—	—	—	48	—	—	Joyride
2018	"Faded Love" (Tinashe featuring Future)	—	—	—	—	—	—	—	—	Joyride
2018	"Push Back" (Ne-Yo, Bebe Rexha & Stefflon Don)	—	—	—	—	—	—	—	—	Good Man
2018	"Almost Love" (Sabrina Carpenter)	—	—	—	—	—	—	—	—	Singular: Act I
2018	"Better" (Khalid)	8	15	6	14	8	4	49	—	Suncity
2019	"Dancing with a Stranger" (Sam Smith & Normani)	7	3	6	8	4	7	37	37	Love Goes
2019	"Bounce Back" (Little Mix)	-	10	86	-	20	13	-	-	
2019	"Afterlife" (Hailee Steinfeld)	-	-	-	-	-	-	-	-	Half Written Story
2020	"To Die For" (Sam Smith)	46	18	15	56	21	34	90	-	-
2021	"Girl from Rio" (Anitta)	-	-	-	-	-	-	-	-	Girl from Rio
		US	UK	AUS	CAN	IRL	NZ	GER	FRA	
Total number-one hits		10	14	6	7	5	9	3	3	
Total top ten hits		30	55	27	20	37	32	18	16	

== Album productions ==
Year	Title	Artist(s)	Album
1999	"Two in a Million"	S Club	S Club
1999	"S Club Party"	S Club	S Club
1999	"Viva la Fiesta"	S Club	S Club
1999	"Hope for the Future"	S Club	S Club
1999	"So Right (Bonus track)"	S Club	S Club
2000	"Hottie"	Ashley Ballard	Get in the Booth
2000	"Day & Night"	Billie Piper	Walk of Life
2001	"So in Love with Two"	Mikaila	Mikaila
2001	"It's All Up to You"	Mikaila	Mikaila
2001	"My Dream is Gone"	Mikaila	Mikaila
2001	"Because of You"	Mikaila	Mikaila
2001	"Rain, Rain"	Cher	Living Proof
2001	"Real Love"	Cher	Living Proof
2005	"Let Me"	Rihanna	Music of the Sun
2006	"So Sick"	Ne-Yo	In My Own Words
2006	"Sexy Love"	Ne-Yo	In My Own Words
2006	"Let Go"	Ne-Yo	In My Own Words
2006	"Time"	Ne-Yo	In My Own Words
2006	"Unfaithful"	Rihanna	A Girl Like Me
2006	"We Ride"	Rihanna	A Girl Like Me
2006	"Hypnotized"	Rihanna	A Girl Like Me
2006	"Crowded"	Jeannie Ortega featuring Papoose	No Place Like BKLYN
2006	"Walk Away (Remember Me)"	Paula DeAnda featuring The D.E.Y.	Paula DeAnda
2006	"So Cold"	Paula DeAnda	Paula DeAnda
2006	"Irreplaceable	Beyoncé	B'Day
2006	"Beautiful Liar	Beyoncé featuring Shakira	B'Day
2006	"If"	Beyoncé	B'Day
2007	"Makes Me Wonder" (Stargate Remix)	Maroon 5 featuring Mims	It Won't Be Soon Before Long
2007	"Because of You"	Ne-Yo	Because of You
2007	"Go On Girl"	Ne-Yo	Because of You
2007	"Spotlight"	Ne-Yo	Because of You
2007	"Don't Stop the Music"	Rihanna	Good Girl Gone Bad
2007	"Hate That I Love You"	Rihanna featuring Ne-Yo	Good Girl Gone Bad
2007	"Good Girl Gone Bad"	Rihanna	Good Girl Gone Bad
2007	"Cry"	Rihanna	Good Girl Gone Bad
2008	"Take a Bow"	Rihanna	Good Girl Gone Bad: Reloaded
2008	"Broken-Hearted Girl"	Beyoncé	I Am... Sasha Fierce
2008	"Ave Maria"	Beyoncé	I Am... Sasha Fierce
2009	"Come Back To Me"	Utada	This Is the One
2009	"Me Muero"	Utada	This Is the One
2009	"Merry Christmas Mr. Lawrence - FYI"	Utada	This Is the One
2009	"Apple and Cinnamon"	Utada	This Is the One
2009	"This One (Crying Like a Child)"	Utada	This Is the One
2009	"Poppin'"	Utada	This Is the One
2009	"Wait Your Turn"	Rihanna	Rated R
2009	"Stupid in Love"	Rihanna	Rated R
2009	"Rude Boy"	Rihanna	Rated R
2009	"Te Amo"	Rihanna	Rated R
2010	"Firework"	Katy Perry	Teenage Dream
2010	"Peacock"	Katy Perry	Teenage Dream
2010	"S&M"	Rihanna	Loud
2010	"What's My Name?"	Rihanna featuring Drake	Loud
2010	"Only Girl (In the World)"	Rihanna	Loud
2011	"Happiness"	Alexis Jordan	Alexis Jordan
2011	"Good Girl"	Alexis Jordan	Alexis Jordan
2011	"How You Like Me Now"	Alexis Jordan	Alexis Jordan
2011	"Say That"	Alexis Jordan	Alexis Jordan
2011	"Love Mist"	Alexis Jordan	Alexis Jordan
2011	"Habit"	Alexis Jordan	Alexis Jordan
2011	"Hush Hush"	Alexis Jordan	Alexis Jordan
2011	"Shout Shout"	Alexis Jordan	Alexis Jordan
2011	"Laying Around"	Alexis Jordan	Alexis Jordan
2011	"Selfish"	Britney Spears	Femme Fatale
2011	"Wet"	Nicole Scherzinger	Killer Love
2011	"Black and Yellow"	Wiz Khalifa	Rolling Papers
2011	"Roll Up"	Wiz Khalifa	Rolling Papers
2011	"Wake Up"	Wiz Khalifa	Rolling Papers
2011	"Stoned"	Wiz Khalifa	Rolling Papers
2011	"I'm Into You	Jennifer Lopez featuring Lil Wayne	Love?
2011	"Talk That Talk"	Rihanna featuring Jay-Z	Talk That Talk
2011	"Drunk on Love"	Rihanna	Talk That Talk
2011	"Roc Me Out"	Rihanna	Talk That Talk
2012	"R.I.P."	Rita Ora featuring Tinie Tempah	Ora
2012	"Love and War"	Rita Ora featuring J. Cole	Ora
2012	"Uneasy"	Rita Ora	Ora
2012	"Young, Single & Sexy"	Rita Ora	Ora
2012	"Diamonds"	Rihanna	Unapologetic
2012	"Jump"	Rihanna	Unapologetic
2012	"Right Now"	Rihanna featuring David Guetta	Unapologetic
2012	"Lost in Paradise"	Rihanna	Unapologetic
2012	"Half of Me"	Rihanna	Unapologetic
2013	"Girlfriend"	Icona Pop	This Is... Icona Pop
2013	"Just Another Night"	Icona Pop	This Is... Icona Pop
2013	"Hold On"	Icona Pop	This Is... Icona Pop
2013	"This Moment"	Katy Perry	Prism
2013	"It Takes Two"	Katy Perry	Prism
2014	"Cannonball"	Lea Michele	Louder
2014	"Black Widow"	Iggy Azalea featuring Rita Ora	The New Classic
2014	"A Place with No Name"	Michael Jackson	Xscape
2014	"Leaving California"	Maroon 5	V
2014	"All Hands on Deck"	Tinashe	Aquarius
2014	"Feels Like Vegas"	Tinashe	Aquarius
2014	"Break the Rules"	Charli XCX	Sucker
2014	"Red Balloon"	Charli XCX	Sucker
2015	"Coming with You"	Ne-Yo	Non-Fiction
2015	"Body Language"	Kid Ink feat. Tinashe and Usher	Full Speed
2015	"Drop That Kitty"	Ty Dolla Sign feat. Charli XCX and Tinashe	—N/a
2015	"Wait on Me"	Rixton	Let the Road
2015	"Worth It"	Fifth Harmony	Reflection
2015	"Cannonball"	Kiesza	Home: Original Motion Picture Soundtrack
2015	"Red Balloon"	Charli XCX	Home: Original Motion Picture Soundtrack
2015	"Dancing in the Dark"	Rihanna	Home: Original Motion Picture Soundtrack
2015	"Feel the Light"	Jennifer Lopez	Home: Original Motion Picture Soundtrack
2015	"Same Old Love"	Selena Gomez	Revival
2015	"Sober"	Selena Gomez	Revival
2015	"Cologne"	Selena Gomez	Revival
2015	"Wildfire"	Demi Lovato	Confident
2015	"Touch"	Pia Mia	—N/a
2015	"Every Day's Like Christmas"	Kylie Minogue	Kylie Christmas
2015	"Bring It Out Of Me"	Ty Dolla Sign	Free TC
2015	"A Head Full of Dreams"	Coldplay	A Head Full of Dreams
2015	"Birds"	Coldplay	A Head Full of Dreams
2015	"Hymn for the Weekend"	Coldplay	A Head Full of Dreams
2015	"Everglow"	Coldplay	A Head Full of Dreams
2015	"Adventure of a Lifetime"	Coldplay	A Head Full of Dreams
2015	"Fun"	Coldplay featuring Tove Lo	A Head Full of Dreams
2015	"Kaleidoscope"	Coldplay	A Head Full of Dreams
2015	"Army of One" (hidden track "X Marks the Spot")	Coldplay	A Head Full of Dreams
2015	"Amazing Day"	Coldplay	A Head Full of Dreams
2015	"Up&Up"	Coldplay	A Head Full of Dreams
2016	"Try Everything"	Shakira	Zootopia (Original Motion Picture Soundtrack)
2016	"Asking 4 It"	Gwen Stefani featuring Fetty Wap	This Is What the Truth Feels Like
2016	"Let You Go"	ASAP Ferg	Always Strive and Prosper
2016	"Write On Me"	Fifth Harmony	7/27
2016	"All in My Head (Flex)"	Fifth Harmony featuring Fetty Wap	7/27
2016	"Gonna Get Better"	Fifth Harmony	7/27
2016	"Scared of Happy"	Fifth Harmony	7/27
2016	"Telepathy"	Christina Aguilera	The Get Down
2016	"After the Afterparty"	Charli XCX featuring Lil Yachty	—N/a
2017	"Issues"	Julia Michaels	Nervous System
2017	"Back to Beautiful (Stargate remix)	Sofia Carson	Back to Beautiful
2017	"Run Up"	Major Lazer featuring PARTYNEXTDOOR and Nicki Minaj	Music Is the Weapon
2017	"Bad Bitch"	Bebe Rexha featuring Ty Dolla $ign	All Your Fault: Pt. 1
2017	"Sundown"	Zara Larsson featuring Wizkid	So Good
2017	"No Vacancy"	OneRepublic	—N/a
2017	"OMG"	Camila Cabello featuring Quavo	—N/a
2017	"I Got Time"	Bebe Rexha	All Your Fault: Pt. 2
2017	"Broken Glass"	Rachel Platten	Waves
2017	"A Million on My Soul"	Alexiane	Valerian and the City of a Thousand Planets (Original Motion Picture Soundtrack)
2017	"Too Good at Goodbyes"	Sam Smith	The Thrill of It All
2017	"New"	Daya	—N/a
2017	"Body Talk"	Majid Jordan	The Space Between
2017	"Track 10"	Charli XCX	Pop 2
2018	"No Drama"	Tinashe featuring Offset	Joyride
2018	"Faded Love"	Tinashe featuring Future	Joyride
2018	"Push Back"	Ne-Yo, Bebe Rexha & Stefflon Don	Good Man
2018	"Over U"	Ne-Yo	Good Man
2018	"Without U"	Ne-Yo	Good Man
2018	"Almost Love"	Sabrina Carpenter	Singular: Act I
2018	"Stay"	Khalid	The Uncle Drew Motion Picture Soundtrack
2018	"Girls Night Out"	Charli XCX	—N/a
2018	"This Time Around"	Jaira Burns	—N/a
2018	"Battle"	David Guetta featuring Faouzia	7
2018	"Blame It on Love"	David Guetta featuring Madison Beer	7
2018	"I'm that Bitch"	David Guetta featuring Saweetie	7
2018	"Motto"	David Guetta & Steve Aoki featuring Lil Uzi Vert, G-Eazy and Mally Mal	7
2018	"Drive"	David Guetta & Black Coffee featuring Delilah Montague	7
2018	"Light Headed"	David Guetta & Sia	7
2018	"If It's Over"	MØ featuring Charli XCX	Forever Neverland
2018	"Keep Talking"	Rita Ora featuring Julia Michaels	Phoenix
2018	"Soul Survivor"	Rita Ora	Phoenix
2019	"Blame It On Your Love"	Charli XCX featuring Lizzo	Charli
2019	"Better"	Khalid	Free Spirit
2019	"Right Back"	Khalid	Free Spirit
2019	"Bounce Back"	Little Mix	TBA
2019	"I Cant Stop Me"	Sabrina Carpenter featuring Saweetie	Singular: Act II
2019	"Afterlife"	Hailee Steinfeld	Dickinson (soundtrack)
2019	“Dancing with a Stranger”	Sam Smith & Normani	Love Goes
2020	“To Die For”	Sam Smith	Love Goes
2020	“For the Lover That I Lost”	Sam Smith	Love Goes
2020	“Forgive Myself”	Sam Smith	Love Goes
2020	"Resilient"	Katy Perry	Smile
2021	"The Chase"	Tinashe	333
2024	"Wonder"	Katy Perry	143
2025	"Chill"	Lisa	Alter Ego
