= Acid Rain (Alexis Jordan song) =

Single by Alexis Jordan
- Released: February 20, 2013
- Genre: Electronic dance; house
- Length: 3:36
- Label: Roc Nation; StarRoc; Columbia
- Songwriters: Paul Baumer; Mikkel S. Eriksen; Sia Furler; Maarten Hoogstraten; Tor E. Hermansen
- Producers: StarGate; Bingo Players

Alexis Jordan singles chronology
"Got 2 Luv U" (2011)	"Acid Rain" (2013)

"Acid Rain" is a song recorded by American singer Alexis Jordan. It was written by Sia with co-writing and production from Norwegian production outfit StarGate and Dutch disc jockeys (DJs) Bingo Players. The latter duo are credited for the inclusion of a sample of their own electro house single "Get Up (Rattle)". "Acid Rain" initially premiered on January 14, 2013, featuring two verses of Jordan's label-mate, American rapper J. Cole. An alternate version of the song excluding Cole was released for digital download on February 20, 2013.

== Background and release ==
On June 10, 2011, Jordan released "Hush Hush" as the third and final single from her self-titled debut album. This was followed by her feature on Sean Paul's single "Got 2 Luv U", which was released on July 19, 2011. All the while, she began working on her second album at Roc the Mic studios in New York City with frequent collaborators StarGate. During a video blog released in November, Jordan revealed she had nearly finished the album.

On January 14, 2013, "Acid Rain" premiered online featuring J. Cole. Jordan announced it would be the lead single from her second studio album. It heavily samples the song "Get Up (Rattle)" by Dutch disc jockeys (DJs) Bingo Players. The final version of the song, excluding Cole's two verses, was released as a digital download on February 20, 2013. She performed the song live for the first time at the Miami Music Week party on March 22, 2013.

== Chart performance ==
On March 2, 2013, it charted in the Netherlands where it debuted at number 99 and peaked, the following week, at 88. It spent only three weeks on the chart. In Belgium it did not achieve enough airplay to reach the top 50, and peaked at 5 in the Flanders Ultratip (equivalent of 55 on the main chart). On the Czech singles chart, the song peaked at 47. In the US, it failed to chart on the Billboard Hot 100, but made an appearance on the dance chart, peaking at number one in May 2013.

== Track listing ==
Digital download

1. "Acid Rain" – 3:36

Digital download EP

1. "Acid Rain - Stargate Extended Edit" – 6:01
2. "Acid Rain - Ferry Corsten Remix" – 5:56
3. "Acid Rain - Steven Redant Remix" – 7:05
4. "Acid Rain - Steven Redant Dub" – 6:34
5. "Acid Rain - KoKo Club Mix" – 4:59

== Charts ==
=== Weekly charts ===
Chart (2013)	Peak position
Belgium (Flanders Ultratip)	55
Czech Republic Airplay (ČNS IFPI)	47
Netherlands (Single Top 100)	88
Poland Dance (ZPAV)	35
US Dance Club Songs (Billboard)	1
US Hot Dance/Electronic Songs (Billboard)	20

=== Year-end charts ===
Chart (2013)	Position
US Dance Club Songs (Billboard)	17
US Hot Dance/Electronic Songs (Billboard)	70

== See also ==
- List of number-one dance singles of 2013 (U.S.)
