= Touch the Sky (Sean Paul song) =

Single by Sean Paul featuring DJ Ammo

from the album Tomahawk Technique
- B-side: "She Doesn't Mind" (Pitbull remix)
- Released: 3 August 2012
- Recorded: 2011–12
- Genre: Electro
- Length: 3:52
- Label: Atlantic
- Songwriters: Damien LeRoy, Sean Henriques
- Producer: DJ Ammo

Sean Paul singles chronology
| "How Deep Is Your Love" (2012) | "Touch the Sky" (2012) | "She Makes Me Go" (2012) |

DJ Ammo singles chronology
| "Touch the Sky" (2012) | "Going Out" (2013) |

"Touch the Sky" is a song by the Jamaican recording artist Sean Paul, from his fifth studio album Tomahawk Technique, featuring American music producer DJ Ammo. It was written by Sean Henriques and Damien LeRoy, and was produced by the later. It was released as a digital download single in Germany on 3 August 2012 through German iTunes Store by Atlantic Records as the sixth and last single from the album. The electro song mixtures dancehall, hip hop, pop and techno tempos. Its respective music video, directed by Davy Duhamel, was released under a 3D format. In it, multiple dancers perform while Sean Paul sings.

"Touch the Sky" received positive reviews upon Tomahawk Technique, who praised its sounds. In music charts, the song performed moderately in international markets. It reached number 31 in Germany, 44 in Austria, and 139 in France, and in Belgium Ultratip charts, it reached number 6 and 25, in the regions of Wallonia and Flanders, respectively.

== Composition ==
"Touch the Sky" was written by Sean Paul Henriques and Damien LeRoy, for Sean Paul's fifth studio album Tomahawk Technique (2012), and it was produced by Leroy. It is an electro song which features dancehall, hip hop, pop and techno tempos, similar to other songs in Tomahawk Technique, like "How Deep Is Your Love" and "She Doesn't Mind".

== Reception ==
=== Critical reception ===
David Jeffries wrote for AllMusic that "Touch the Sky" "spit[s] out catch phrases and come-ons as the dancefloor fills." Paul MacInnes from The Guardian noted that Sean Paul's " enthusiasm is matched with a halfway catchy hook [... as] discernment is thrown joyfully out of the window." John McDonnell considered Tomahawk Technique as a "creative decline", but he excluded "Touch the Sky". Dani Fromm considered the song to have "chill rave sounds", and they "still immense futuristic." Marlon Bishop described the song as "a catchy club tune straight out of the Swedish House Mafia playbook." Jocelyn Uithaler from Channel O said "Touch the Sky" is "another party anthem" and it is "perfect for the dance floor."

=== Commercial performance ===
In the German Singles Chart, "Touch the Sky" debuted and peaked at number 31 on 17 August 2012. On 3 August 2012 the song debuted at number 74 in the Austrian Singles Chart. The next week, the song reached its peak position, at 44. Two weeks later the song left the chart. In France "Touch the Sky" debuted and peaked at number 139. While in the Flanders region of Belgium the song reached the 25th position of the Ultratip chart, in the Wallonia region it reached the 6th in the same complementary chart.

== Music video ==
A music video to accompany the release of "Touch the Sky" was first released onto YouTube on 2 July 2012 at a total length of 3:56 minutes. The music video was directed by Davy Duhamel, and it was released in a 3D format. The music video begins with a Samsung tab located in a colourful space, it turns 180°, and Sean Paul appears in the screen with dancers on the background. Throughout the video Sean Paul sings in what a Los 40 Principales reviewer described as a "futuristic aesthetic" while images "overlap" or "change [their] colour".

== Track listing ==
Digital download
| No. | Title | Length |
|---|---|---|
| 1. | "Touch the Sky" (featuring DJ Ammo) | 3:52 |
| 2. | "She Doesn't Mind" (Pitbull Remix) | 4:00 |
| 3. | "She Doesn't Mind" (DJ Laszlo Radio Edit) | 4:10 |
| 4. | "Touch the Sky" (featuring DJ Ammo) (Music video) | 3:52 |

== Credits and personnel ==
- Lead vocals – Sean Paul
- Producers – DJ Ammo
- Lyrics – Damien Leroy, Sean Henriques
- Label: Atlantic Records

== Chart performance ==
| Chart (2012) | Peak position |
|---|---|
| Austria (Ö3 Austria Top 40) | 44 |
| Belgium (Ultratip Bubbling Under Flanders) | 25 |
| Belgium (Ultratip Bubbling Under Wallonia) | 6 |
| France (SNEP) | 139 |
| Germany (Media Control AG) | 31 |

== Release history ==
| Region | Date | Format | Label |
|---|---|---|---|
| Germany | 3 August 2012 | Digital download | Atlantic Records |
