= Aggressive (directors) =

American music video directing duo

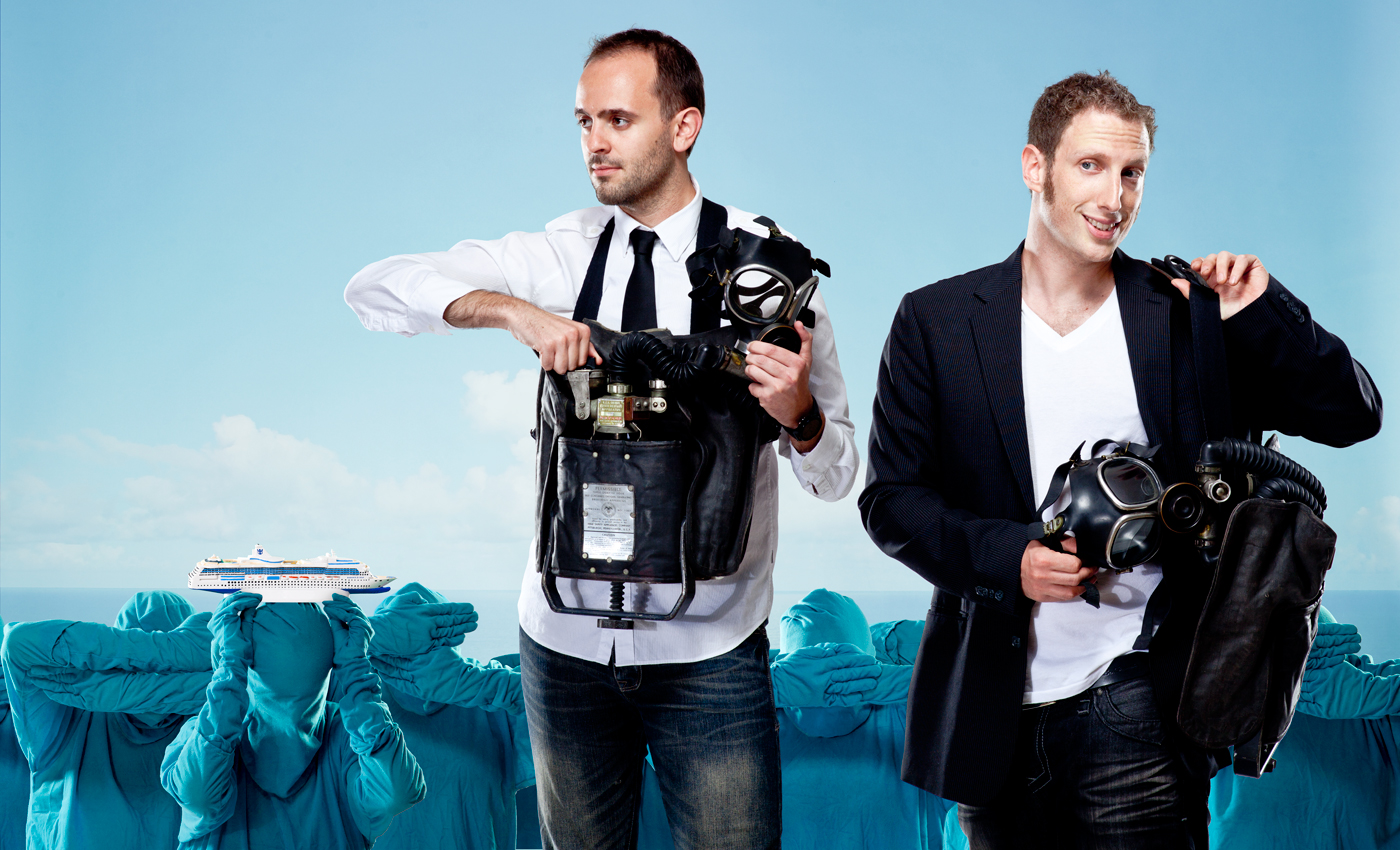
- Alex Topaller and Dan Shapiro, Aggressive
- Industry: Filmmakers, Commercial and Music Video Directors
- Headquarters: New York City, U.S.
- Website: www.aggressive.tv

Aggressive is a New York based design studio founded by Grammy award-winning filmmakers Alex Topaller and Daniel Shapiro. They have been described by Movie Creation Mag as "having a fascination with the wonderful, in the likes of the surrealist Rafał Olbiński" and "tenacious about pushing themselves and some overclocked hardware in order to create striking videos" by Video Static.

They have directed and produced music videos for artists including The Beatles, Michael Jackson and Pharrell Williams, and created an XR concert for Alicia Keys. They have also directed commercials for brands such as Toyota, Bloomberg, Amazon, Google, Boeing, Honda, American Express, Intel, and more.

Their work has been shown at events like SXSW, Global Expo Dubai, The Concours d’Elegance at Pebble Beach, The UN General Assembly, and Bloomberg New Economy Forum.

Topaller and Shapiro’s film MURALS, which uses 3D scanning to depict the war devastation in Ukraine and images of Banksy’s artwork, premiered at the Cannes Film Festival and won the Audience Award for "Best Art & XR" at the BFI London Film Festival and the “Best International Immersive” Award at Doc Edge Festival.

Their science fiction thriller ESCAPE ATTEMPT premiered at the Sitges Film Festival and won the "Navigator Pirx Award for Best Sci-Fi" at the Haapsalu Horror and Fantasy Film Festival. It also received "Best Sci-Fi" and "Grand Prize" awards at FilmQuest and debuted in Canada at the Fantasia International Film Festival.

Both coming up from VFX backgrounds, Topaller and Shapiro take a hands-on approach in all aspects of the process, from concept development, to shoot direction, all the way through post-production.

In February 2022, Aggressive launched Paper Planes, a relief project supporting Ukrainian artists impacted by the Russian invasion of Ukraine. The not-for-profit collaborated with over 50 Ukrainian artists, creating over 500 pieces of art, culminating in a charity exhibition at the ShowGallery in Los Angeles on March 27, 2023.

== Accolades ==
=== Music Video Awards ===
- 2008 Winner Latin Grammy Award for Best Short Form Music Video (Juanes "Me Enamora")
- 2008 Nominee "Video Of The Year" MTVLA Los Premios (Juanes "Me Enamora")
- 2008 Nominee MTV Video Music Awards Pop Video Of The Year (Kerli "Walking on Air")
- 2009 Estonian Music Award Music Video Of The Year (Kerli "Walking on Air")

=== Film and Creative Awards ===
- 2016 Best Experimental BassAwards (1976)
- 2016 Vimeo Staff Pick (1976)
- 2016 Nowness (1976)
- 2019 Communication Arts Award Of Excellence (Land O'Lakes “The Copernicus Project”)
- 2019 Best of Behance 2019 (“The Copernicus Project” & “Bloomberg RCRT Data Viz”)
- 2020 AICP Next Creative Data Shortlist (Land O'Lakes “The Copernicus Project”)
- 2020 D&AD Graphic Design Shortlist (Land O'Lakes “The Copernicus Project”)
- 2021 Communicator Award Of Excellence (Freight Rail Works “Transforming Tomorrow”)
- 2021 Communicator Award Of Excellence Integrated Campaign (Freight Rail Works “Transforming Tomorrow”)
- 2021 ADC Awards Spatial Design Bronze (Amazon “Inside The Boys”)
- 2021 ADC Awards Innovation Merit (Amazon “Inside The Boys”)
- 2021 ADC Awards Digital Experiences Merit (Amazon “Inside The Boys”)
- 2021 The One Show Merit (Amazon “Inside The Boys”)
- 2022 AAFDC Awards Best Of Cross Platform (“9/11 Never Forget Fund”)
- 2022 AAFDC Awards Gold Campaign (“9/11 Never Forget Fund”)
- 2022 AAFDC Awards Gold Cross Platform (“9/11 Never Forget Fund”)
- 2022 AAFDC Awards Silver Marketing (“9/11 Never Forget Fund”)
- 2022 AAFDC Awards Silver PSA (“9/11 Never Forget Fund”)
- 2022 Communicator Award Of Excellence (“9/11 Never Forget Fund”)
- 2023 Communicator Award Of Excellence (Freight Rail Works “Coupler”)
- 2023 AAFDC Awards Gold & Best Of Film (Freight Rail Works “Coupler”)
- 2023 AAFDC Awards Gold Animation & VFX (Freight Rail Works “Coupler”)
- 2023 AAFDC Awards Best Of Film (Freight Rail Works “Coupler”)
- 2023 Cannes Film Festival NEXT Official Selection (“MURALS”)
- 2023 BFI London Film Festival Audience "Award for Best Art and XR" (“MURALS”)
- 2023 Sitges Film Festival Official Selection (“Escape Attempt”)
- 2023 Warsaw International Film Festival Out Of Competition (“MURALS”)
- 2023 FilmQuest Festival Best Sci-Fi Award (“Escape Attempt”)
- 2023 FilmQuest Festival 2023 Grand Prize (“Escape Attempt”)
- 2023 Tallinn Black Nights Film Festival (PÖFF) Official Selection (“MURALS”)
- 2023 Geneva International Film Festival (GIFF) Immersive Competition (“MURALS”)
- 2023 Ciclope Festival, Berlin, Germany "Bronze Award" (“MURALS”)
- 2024 LAKFF 2024 Official Selection (“Escape Attempt”)
- 2024 Les Intergalactiques Sci-Fi Festival Official Selection (“Escape Attempt”)
- 2024 Doc Edge Festival ‘Best International Immersive Impact’ Award (“MURALS”)
- 2024 Haapsalu Horror and Fantasy Film Festival (HÕFF) "Navigator Pirx Award for Best Sci-Fi Film" (“Escape Attempt”)
- 2024 Hollywood Shortfest Official Selection (“MURALS”)
- 2024 The Webby Awards "Best Installation or Experience Nominee" (“MURALS”)
- 2024 ADC Awards Design for Good Bronze Cube (“MURALS”)
- 2024 AICP NEXT "Experiential Shortlist" (“MURALS”)
- 2024 AICP NEXT "Purpose Driven" Shortlist (“MURALS”)
- 2024 DeadCenter Film Festival Official Selection (“MURALS”)
- 2024 RIFF 2024 Official Selection (“Escape Attempt”)
- 2024 Zagreb Film Festival Official Selection (“Escape Attempt”)
- 2024 Fantasia Film Festival 2024 Official Selection (“Escape Attempt”)
- 2024 BIFAN Bucheon International Fantastic Film Festival Official Selection (“MURALS”)
- 2024 Cannes Lions Design Shortlist (“MURALS”)
- 2024 Collision Awards "Craft: Art Direction" Silver (“MURALS”)
- 2024 Collision Awards "Craft: Directing" Silver (“MURALS”)
- 2024 Collision Awards "Social Impact" Gold (“MURALS”)
- 2024 Rhode Island International Film Festival (RIIFF) Official Selection (“Escape Attempt”)

== Exhibitions ==
- 2024: ‘Cafe Kyiv’ Berlinale, Berlin, Germany (“MURALS”)
- 2024: PoCo Pop and Contemporary Art Museum, Tallinn, Estonia (“MURALS”)
- 2024: Museum Of Modern Art, Warsaw, Poland (“MURALS”)
- 2024: Cinema Astra, Florence, Italy (“MURALS”)

== Music videos ==
Year	Song title	Artist(s)	Ref #
2015	Change Your World	Tiësto featuring Jane Zhang	
2014	Loves Me Not	Cris Cab	
2013	Liar Liar	Cris Cab featuring Pharrell	
2013	Live for the Night	Krewella	
2012	Eat Dirt	Susan Justice	
2011	Behind the Mask	Michael Jackson	
2010	Cinnamon	Stone Temple Pilots	
2010	Happiness	Alexis Jordan	
2009	Breakeven	The Script	
2008	Walking on Air	Kerli	
2008	Gotas de Agua Dulce	Juanes	
2008	Me Enamora	Juanes	
2007	Jenny	The Click Five	
2007	The Arms of Sorrow	Killswitch Engage	
2007	À Tout le Monde (Set Me Free)	Megadeth	
2006	I Still Remember	Bloc Party	
2006	Concrete Jungle	Black Label Society	
2006	Born to Lead	Hoobastank	
2005	Summer Nights	Lil Rob	
