= Autumn Rowe =

American singer-songwriter (born 1981)

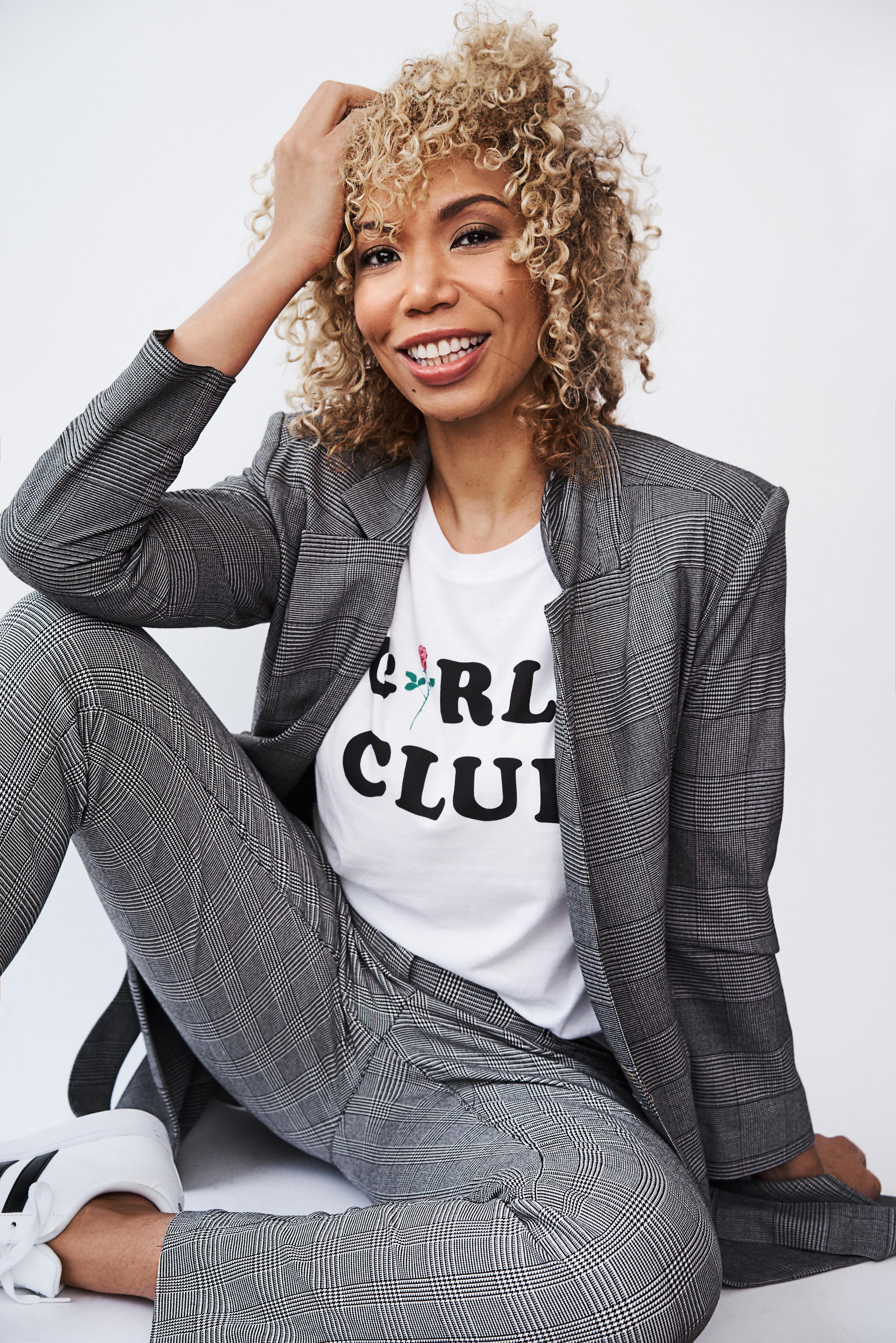

Background information
- Also known as: AFTR PRTY
- Born: May 25, 1981 (age 44); New York City, U.S.
- Origin: Los Angeles, California, U.S.
- Genres: R&B; pop; hip hop; dance
- Occupations: Singer; songwriter; record producer; vocal coach; TV personality; activist
- Years active: 2003–present
- Labels: Steller Songs, Stargate Productions, EMI UK, Star Roc/Roc Nation/Sony, Ultra Records, Sony ATV
- Website: www.autumnrowe.com

Autumn Rowe (born May 25, 1981) is an American singer-songwriter, TV personality, DJ, and activist from New York, NY. In 2010, she helped write the song "Happiness" by Alexis Jordan, with producers Stargate and Deadmau5, which FIFA named the official song of the 2011 FIFA Women's World Cup in Germany. In 2015, Rowe signed an artist deal with Ultra Records, and in 2018, she began performing publicly as the DJ, dubbed AFTR PRTY. In early 2020, she wrote and performed vocals on the drum and bass song "Good To Me", by British DJ Friction. In 2020, Rowe began to use her platform for activism and co-wrote the song "We Are" with Jon Batiste, which was used on the "Mask Up America" campaign.

== Early life and education ==
Rowe was born at the Beth Israel Hospital in Manhattan, New York (Lower East Side) to an interracial couple. She is of mixed African-American and Eastern European Jewish heritage.

Rowe grew up on Prospect Avenue in Mott Haven. She was enrolled in the gifted and talented program at Junior High School 149. While a student, Rowe performed in four different choirs, performing on stage at Radio City Music Hall after school, called "British Rock Symphony". As Rowe states, "the singing definitely came before the songwriting. I didn't know I could write songs at first. I was always into writing poems and short stories, but it took me a while to figure out I could write songs."

At age 16, Rowe had an internship at Island Records. She decided she preferred creating music over working with labels.

== Career in songwriting ==
=== 2009–2013 ===
Rowe's first co-writing credit came when she signed a development deal with producer Swizz Beatz who played one of her original songs to British soul artist Estelle. Estelle decided to rewrite parts of the song for her own project, keeping Rowe's hooks and writing new verses around it. This was Rowe's first experience of co-writing with an artist.

In 2009, Rowe signed with B-Room/Water Music Publishing, which led her to a joint publishing deal with Steller Songs/Stargate Productions/EMI UK. In 2010, Rowe wrote the song "Rockstar" for NL pop singer Eva Simons, which Rowe cites as being the beginning for her when it came to writing for a major label artist. She was a writer for "Happiness" by Alexis Jordan, the song later becoming the FIFA Women's World Cup theme in 2011. During an interview, Rowe stated, "Alexis Jordan's 'Happiness' is really significant, because it was my first hit and gave me my break in the industry." Rowe also helped write Jordan's second and third singles from her debut album, namely, "Good Girl", and "Hush Hush".

In 2011, Rowe co-wrote the pop single "Hello" with duo Karmin, Stargate and Claude Kelly. Rowe also collaborated with British artist Cher Lloyd on the multi-platinum single "Swagger Jagger". In the same year, Rowe met The X Factor winner Alexandra Burke and began working on her album. Rowe also began writing with Leona Lewis and worked with her on her 2011 single "Collide" with Avicii, which peaked at number 4 on the UK Singles Chart. Rowe also was a writer for her 2013 single "Your Hallelujah". In 2013, Rowe was a writer for the track "Don't Wanna Dance Alone" from the Fifth Harmony debut EP, Better Together.

=== 2014–2020 ===
Over the next few years, Rowe collaborated with many artists, including The Knocks, Alex Newell, Lindsey Stirling, RuthAnne, Dua Lipa, Pitbull, The Saturdays, Pink, Kacy Hill and Lindsey Stirling. In 2014, Rowe wrote "Sexy Love" with Cutfather and Wayne Hector in a writing camp in Copenhagen. The song was later recorded by Kylie Minogue and featured on her album, Kiss Me Once. In the same year, Rowe co-wrote "Superbad" with Jesse McCartney for his album, In Technicolor. Continuing her collaborations with America's Got Talent contestant Grace Vaderwaal, Rowe co-wrote her singles: "Gossip Girl", "Light the Sky", and "Clay". In 2017, Rowe collaborated with Leona Lewis on the Pitbull single, "Only Ones To Know".

Rowe was a writer for the song "Love's Just a Feeling" from Lindsey Stirling's album Brave Enough. She wrote and performed on "Give A Little" by American pop band The Hot Damns. Rowe was also a writer for "Salt" by Ava Max, from Max's debut album Heaven & Hell.

In 2020, Rowe revealed she had been collaborating with longtime friend, Jon Batiste, on his single "We Are". It was used for the official ''Mask Up America'' campaign. Rowe cites the song as being "very special" to her. In November 2020, Rowe collaborated with producer Future Cut on the song "Why Don't You Love Me" which had been recorded by Dua Lipa and FKA Twigs and was teased on Lipa's live stream entitled "Studio 2054".

== Rest of musical career ==
=== Autumn's Rowe Band and later work ===
In 2003, Rowe formed a band called "Rowe Band", with herself as the lead singer. In 2005, the band worked with Swizz Beats, who mentored her, which led to a collaboration in 2007 with Bone Thugs-n-Harmony where Rowe sang on "Candy Paint" produced by Swizz Beatz.

In 2006, Rowe released the EP Sunshine, whose title song was later used in the soundtrack for the 2011 indie film My Last Day Without You. In 2012, Rowe performed with French rapper Disiz on the song Best Day, which was released via Def Jam Records in France.

In 2015, Rowe signed an artist deal with Ultra Records, releasing her debut single, "If I Don't Have You". The song charted at 10 on the Deep House EDM Chart. In 2018, Rowe began performing publicly as the DJ AFTR PRTY.

=== Vocal coaching ===
In 2012. Rowe became vocal coach on Fox's The X Factor USA, where she coached and wrote for acts such as Fifth Harmony, Beatrice Miller and Carly Rose Sonenclar. From 2013 to 2017, Rowe was a vocal coach for NBC's America's Got Talent. In seasons 8-12, she was the only vocal coach on the show. During these seasons, she worked with winners Darci Lynne and Grace VanderWaal.

Stepping away from vocal coaching on televised talent shows, Rowe was invited to judge on various songwriting competitions, including the Music Is the Universal Cure Song competition and the ASCAP Peggy Lee Songwriter Competition.

=== Activism ===
As a coach and advocate for artists and songwriters, Rowe took the position of co-director for the Coronavirus Songwriter Emergency Relief Fund in 2020, offering grants to support songwriters through the pandemic.

As a half-Black/Jewish songwriter, Rowe later began to use her social platform for activism, with a primary focus on the fight against racism and antisemitism, telling BBC Newsbeat in June 2020; "The fact is I am a black person, I can also be a Jewish person, I can also be a woman and a vegan, but no matter what, you can't take away from me that I'm a black person and you cannot take away my experience." In the same article, Rowe calls upon her fellow industry colleagues to play their role in the fight against all kinds of racism, stating; "as artists and writers, we have a way to communicate to the entire world – we have the platform of music – it's a universal language." Around the same time, Rowe joined songwriter Jocelyn Alice to create a webshow called The Conversation, a show which discusses the personal experiences of racism within friendships and also the music industry.

== Style and influences ==
Rowe grew up listening to DJs through her bedroom window in the southside of Bronx. "There was always music around me," Rowe expressed. Her prized possession was her mother's music collection, which she would listen to daily.

Rowe has cited Stevie Wonder, Michael Jackson, Mariah Carey, Massive Attack, Everything but the Girl, Kanye West, Hozier, Muse and TLC as her inspirations. She described her musical taste as being diverse. Rowe stated that she enjoys "emotive lyrics and music that makes you feel something whether it's in the club or in your heart."

== Personal life ==
Rowe married Even Stenvold Tysse in Norway, Europe in 2019 and currently lives in Los Angeles, CA. Outside of music, Rowe is a fan of animals, cooking and vintage clothes. Rowe says, "I have to go to the zoo in every country I'm in, I enjoy cooking and finding vintage clothing gems in random shops. I would really love to meet a sloth if that matters at all."

== Writing credits ==
All credits adapted from Discogs.com. and Spotify

- "Happiness" by Alexis Jordan
- "Good Girl" by Alexis Jordan
- "Hush Hush" by Alexis Jordan
- "Swagger Jagger" by Cher Lloyd
- "Picture Me" by Chipmunk featuring Ace Young
- "Collide" by Leona Lewis featuring Avicii
- "Stick Shift" by Antoine Clamaran featuring Soraya
- "Talkin' That" by Cher Lloyd
- "Red Planet" by Little Mix featuring T-Boz
- "Hello" by Karmin
- "Fire" by Alexandra Burke
- "30 Days" by The Saturdays
- "Flight 22" by Kali Uchis
- "Your Hallelujah" by Leona Lewis
- "Copycat" by Skream featuring Kelis
- "Only When You're Close" by Zendaya
- "Sounds Like Heaven" by Marina Kaye featuring Lindsey Stirling
- "Missing You" by Alex Gaudino featuring Nicole Scherzinger
- "Sexy Love" by Kylie Minogue
- "Love" by Kylie Minogue
- "Superbad" by Jesse McCartney
- "Goodiebag" by Jesse McCartney
- "Collect My Love" by The Knocks featuring Alex Newell
- "Gossip Girl" by Grace VanderWaal
- "Clay" by Grace VanderWaal
- "Light the Sky" by Grace VanderWaal
- "Only Ones to Know" by Pitbull featuring Leona Lewis
- "Room for 2" by Dua Lipa
- "Love's Just a Feeling" by Lindsey Stirling featuring RuthAnne
- "Christmas C'mon" by Lindsey Stirling featuring Becky G
- "Pretty Little Secret" by Emma Steinbakken
- "Faller" by EHI
- "I Own It" by Nacey
- "Take What I Can Get" by RuthAnne
- "Good to Me" by Friction
- "Boy, You Can Keep It" by Alex Newell
- "Butterflies" by Luke Burr
- "Salt" by Ava Max
- "Easy" by Peder Elias
- "We Are" by Jon Batiste
- "Selfish" by YooA
- "More to Lose" by Miley Cyrus of Something Beautiful
