= Hold On (Sean Paul song) =

Single by Sean Paul

from the album Tomahawk Technique
- Released: 5 March 2012
- Recorded: 2011
- Genre: Pop rap; reggae fusion
- Length: 4:08
- Label: Atlantic
- Songwriters: Pierre "The Maven" Medor; Rico Love; Sean Paul Henriques
- Producers: Pierre "The Maven" Medor; Rico Love

Sean Paul singles chronology
"Summer Paradise" (2012)	"Hold On" (2012)	"Dream Girl" (2012)

"Hold On" is the third single from the Jamaican musician Sean Paul's fifth studio album Tomahawk Technique. It was written by Pierre "The Maven" Medor, Rico Love and Paul, and was produced by Medor and Love. The song charted in France.

== Music video ==
A lyric video was released to accompany the release of "Hold On" on 21 February 2012 at a total length of four minutes and nine seconds.

== Credits and personnel ==
- Lead vocals – Sean Paul
- Producers – Pierre "The Maven" Medor, Rico Love
- Lyrics – Pierre "The Maven" Medor, Rico Love, Sean Paul Henriques
- Label: Atlantic

== Chart performance ==
Chart (2012)	Peak position
Belgium (Ultratip Bubbling Under Wallonia)	1
France (SNEP)	35
UK Singles (OCC)	86
