= Sandy Vee =

French music producer, DJ and songwriter

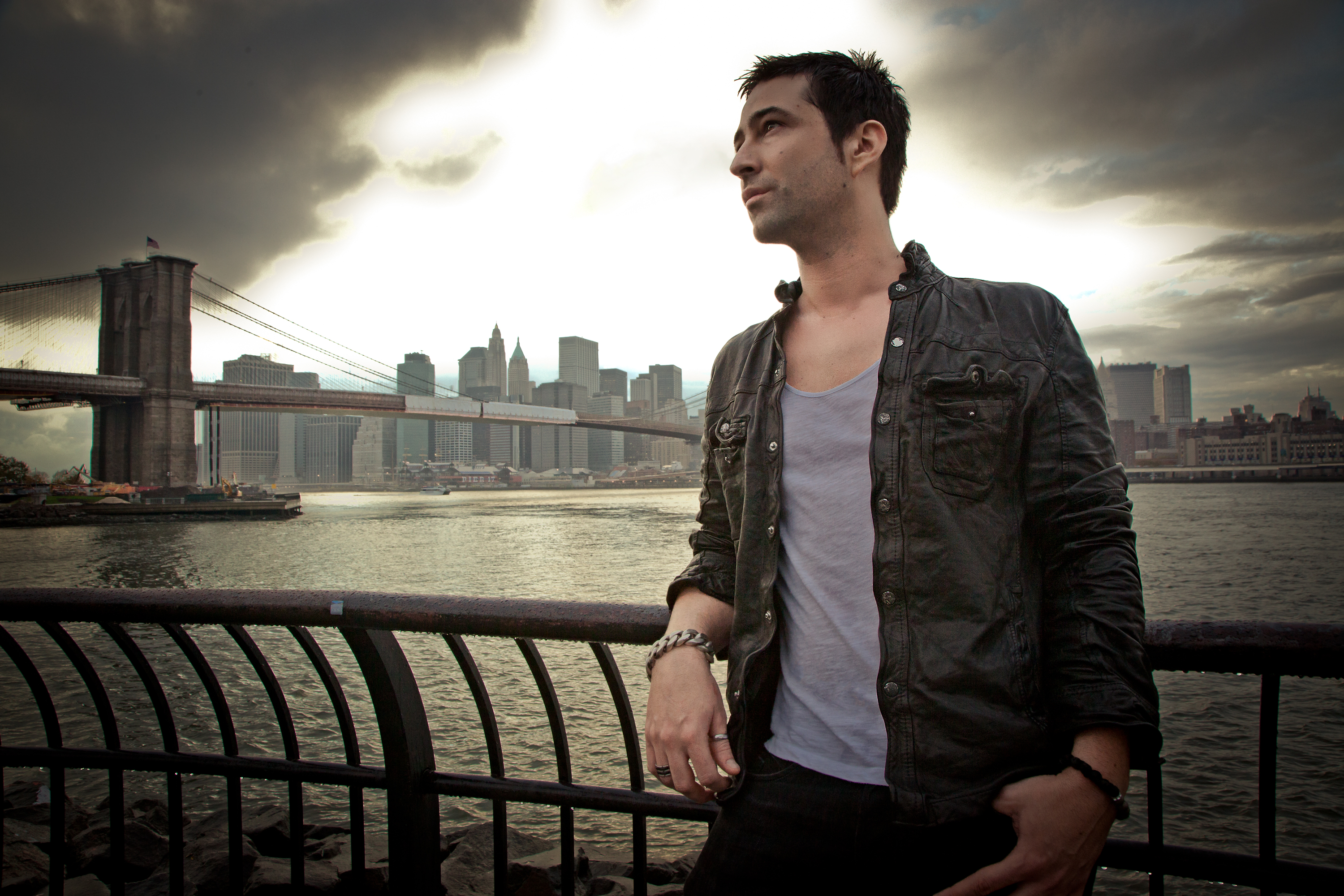
- Vee in 2010

Background information
- Also known as: Overload; System Works; The Man Who Doesn't Have to Try
- Born: Sandy Julien Wilhelm; 22 April 1975 (age 50)
- Origin: Toulouse, Occitania, France
- Genres: House
- Occupations: Record producer, DJ, songwriter
- Years active: 2001–present

Sandy Julien Wilhelm (French pronunciation: [sɑ̃ndi ʒyljɛ̃ vilɛm]; born 22 April 1975), better known by his stage name Sandy Vee, is a French music producer, DJ and songwriter. He gained much commercial and critical recognition for co-producing Rihanna's "Only Girl (In the World)", Katy Perry's "Firework", and eight songs on the David Guetta album One Love. He originally played bass in a variety of jazz, rock, and punk bands before gaining exposure to the underground DJ scene in France. He currently resides in New York City.

Sandy Vee won the Best Dance Recording at the 2011 Grammy Awards for Rihanna's "Only Girl (In the World)". He was also nominated in the category Album of the Year for Katy Perry's Teenage Dream.

== Early success ==
Vee was DJing at the Fuck Me I'm Famous party at Pacha Ibiza when David Guetta approached him after a set and told him how much he loved his track "Bleep". The two producers bonded and went into the studio to produce the song that would eventually become "On The Dancefloor" for will.i.am. However, according to Vee, "we discovered that not only did we work well together, but we worked fast... We figured there was no reason to stop, so we just kept going". This led to Vee co-producing 8 songs on Guetta's globally successful record One Love.

== Recent work ==
After the success with One Love, Vee became a desired name on the pop production circuit. Sandy went on to work with Norwegian production duo Stargate, who Sandy described their initial meeting in 2009 as: "I played them a few tunes I was working on at the time and they went crazy for one in particular...so we worked together and finished it". The first track the group worked on was eventually placed with Sean Kingston.

Stargate and Vee continued to work together, producing hits for Katy Perry ("Firework"), Rihanna ("Only Girl (In the World)", "S&M") and Ne-Yo ("Beautiful Monster"), Britney Spears ("Selfish"), and more. Sandy currently lives in New York where he has since exponentially increased his production credits with credits on records for Taio Cruz, Pitbull, Selena Gomez, Nikki Williams.

== Number one singles ==
2009: David Guetta feat. Akon - "Sexy Bitch"
2010: Rihanna - "Only Girl (In the World)"
2010: Katy Perry - "Firework"
2011: Rihanna - "S&M"

== Grammy nominations and awards ==
2011: Best Dance Recording, Rihanna - "Only Girl (In the World)" (Won)
2012: Record of the Year, Katy Perry - "Firework" (Nominated)
2012: Album of the Year, Rihanna - "Loud" (Nominated)
2012: Best Dance/Electronica Album, David Guetta - "Nothing But the Beat" (Nominated)

== Songwriting and production discography ==
| Year | Artist | Album | Song |
|---|---|---|---|
| 2009 | David Guetta | One Love | "Gettin' Over" |
| 2009 | David Guetta | One Love | "Sexy Bitch" |
| 2009 | David Guetta | One Love | "On the Dancefloor" |
| 2009 | David Guetta | One Love | "Missing You" |
| 2009 | David Guetta | One Love | "One Love" |
| 2009 | David Guetta | One Love | "I Wanna Go Crazy" |
| 2009 | David Guetta | One Love | "If We Ever" |
| 2010 | Taio Cruz | Rokstarr | "Higher" |
| 2010 | Katy Perry | Teenage Dream | "Firework" |
| 2010 | Akon | Stadium | "Angel" |
| 2010 | Rihanna | Loud | "S&M" |
| 2010 | Rihanna | Loud | "Only Girl (In the World)" |
| 2010 | Ne-Yo | Libra Scale | "Beautiful Monster" |
| 2010 | Sean Kingston | Single | "Party All Night (Sleep All Day)" |
| 2010 | Kelly Rowland | Here I Am | "Commander" |
| 2010 | Pitbull (feat. T-Pain) | Planet Pit | "Hey Baby (Drop It to the Floor)" |
| 2011 | Alexis Jordan | Alexis Jordan | "Good Girl" |
| 2011 | Alexis Jordan | Alexis Jordan | "Hush Hush" |
| 2011 | Nicole Scherzinger | Killer Love | "Wet" |
| 2011 | Britney Spears | Femme Fatale | "Selfish" |
| 2011 | David Guetta | Nothing But the Beat | "Where Them Girls At" |
| 2011 | Bella | Single | "Nobody Loves Me" |
| 2011 | Selena Gomez & the Scene | When the Sun Goes Down | "Middle of Nowhere" |
| 2011 | Leona Lewis | Single | "Collide" |
| 2013 | Nicole Scherzinger | Single | "Boomerang" |
| 2013 | Nikki Williams | Single | "Glowing" |
| 2013 | Pia Toscano | Single | "Make You A Man" |
| 2014 | Enrique Iglesias | Sex and Love | "Physical" |
| 2014 | Enrique Iglesias | Sex and Love | "3 Letters" |
