= Willie Jae =

- Born: William Jae; September 2, 1986 (age 40)
- Origin: Newark, New Jersey, United States
- Genres: R&B, jazz, urban
- Occupations: Singer, rapper, actor, entrepreneur
- Years active: 2004–present
- Labels: Roc Nation, StarRoc
- Website: starrocrecords.com

Willie Jae (born September 2, 1986) is an American singer-songwriter and entrepreneur from Newark, New Jersey. Jae is most known in the hip hop community for being the first artist of any genre to accumulate both one million song plays and 1 million downloads in 2001. Riding on the success of his Mixtape he began ghostwriting several rap and R&B records for major acts. Jae has been the go to "hook" writer for hip hop's biggest acts since the young age of 16, starting off writing for fun, and ending up ghostwriting for Def Jam writers. After a year of ghostwriting for a major label, Jae decided to branch out and become an indie artist, while still writing commercial records per Diem. In 2008 Jae retired from writing, and began a new career as an entrepreneur, he liked the idea of working for himself and financial independence. In 2011 Jae was presented with the opportunity to buy into a private social media management company, already becoming a social media powerhouse himself he took the opportunity and bought an estimated 64% of the company. Realizing that he could use the connections he had made in the music industry to expand the company Jae returned to the hip hop music scene, and after reconnecting with former clients he was convinced to come out of retirement, and since been in negotiations for a publishing deal with Jay-Z's StarRoc.

His debut album, Its Tha Roc, was due for release in December 2014, and was promised to be a showcase of hip hop and R&B's most talented unsigned artist, and feature the single that built him a cult following among fans of independent music. As of May 2018, the album has not been released.
