= StarRoc =

- Parent company: Roc Nation
- Founded: 2008; 18 years ago
- Founder: Jay-Z; Mikkel S. Eriksen; Tor Erik Hermansen
- Defunct: 2014; 12 years ago
- Status: Defunct
- Distributors: Universal Music Distribution (Universal Music Group)
- Genre: Dance-pop, electropop
- Country of origin: United States
- Location: New York City, New York

StarRoc was an American entertainment company. The company operated a full service record label and music publishing house. It was founded in 2008 by American rapper Jay-Z and Norwegian record production team Mikkel S. Eriksen and Tor Erik Hermansen of the production duo Stargate. The label was a 50/50 partnership between Stargate and Jay-Z's Roc Nation entertainment company, which he signed in the same year to Live Nation. StarRoc, during its time, was headquartered at Jay-Z's recording studio, Roc the Mic, in Manhattan, New York City, United States. Both America's Got Talent contestant Alexis Jordan and songwriter Range were signed to the label.

== Roster ==
=== Former artists ===
- Alexis Jordan
- Willie Jae

== Discography ==
=== Studio albums ===
- Roc Nation Presents: Range (A Gangsta Grillz Mixtape) - Range (2010)
- Alexis Jordan - Alexis Jordan (2011)
- No Strings - Range (2011) (Shelved)

=== Singles ===
- "Ghetto Dance" (Featuring Rick Ross) - Range (2010)
- "Happiness" - Alexis Jordan (2010)
- "Good Girl" - Alexis Jordan (2011)
- "Hush Hush" - Alexis Jordan (2011)
- "Acid Rain" - Alexis Jordan (2013)

== See also ==
- Stargate
- Roc Nation
- List of record labels
