= She Doesn't Mind =

2011 single by Sean Paul

Single by Sean Paul

from the album Tomahawk Technique
- Released: 31 October 2011
- Genre: Electropop; dancehall; dance-pop
- Length: 3:47 (album version); 4:00 (Pitbull remix)
- Label: Atlantic
- Songwriters: Sean Paul Henriques; Shellback; Benny Blanco
- Producers: Shellback; Benny Blanco

Sean Paul singles chronology
"Got 2 Luv U" (2011)	"She Doesn't Mind" (2011)	"Summer Paradise" (2012)

Music video
- "She Doesn't Mind" on YouTube

"She Doesn't Mind" is a song by Jamaican dancehall recording artist Sean Paul, released as the second single from his fifth studio album Tomahawk Technique. It was written by Paul, Shellback and Benny Blanco and produced by the latter two. The song was released on 29 September 2011 on NRJ & Skyrock (French radios), to iTunes on 31 October, and to U.S. mainstream radio on 24 January 2012. Like its predecessor "Got 2 Luv U", which features American singer Alexis Jordan, it debuted at number-one in Switzerland. Internationally, the song also topped the charts in Austria, and peaked within the top ten charts of several other countries, including France, Germany, Israel, Norway, the Republic of Ireland, Romania and the United Kingdom.

It was featured on the European release of the video game Grand Slam Tennis 2.

The official remix featuring American rapper Pitbull was released on 26 March 2012.

== Music video ==
The official music video for "She Doesn't Mind" was released on 25 November 2011. It was directed by Evan Winter and produced by Nestor N. Rodriguez.

The music video was filmed at Long Island's MacArthur Airport in Ronkonkoma, Town of Islip, Suffolk County, New York.

The music video featured a special guest, Lisa Jackson from cycle 9 of America's Next Top Model who acted as a TSA officer.

== Track listings ==
- Digital download
1. "She Doesn't Mind" – 3:47
- Digital download – Pitbull remix
1. "She Doesn't Mind" (remix) (featuring Pitbull) – 4:00

== Charts ==
=== Weekly charts ===
Chart (2011–2012)	Peak position
Australia (ARIA)	46
Austria (Ö3 Austria Top 40)	1
Belgium (Ultratop 50 Flanders)	5
Belgium (Ultratop 50 Wallonia)	4
Bulgaria (IFPI)	4
Canada Hot 100 (Billboard)	49
Czech Republic Airplay (ČNS IFPI)	18
Finland (Suomen virallinen lista)	14
France (SNEP)	3
Germany (GfK)	2
Hungary (Rádiós Top 40)	3
Ireland (IRMA)	10
Israel International Airplay (Media Forest)	3
Japan Hot 100 (Billboard)	25
Lebanon (Lebanese Top 20)	8
Luxembourg (Billboard)	7
Netherlands (Dutch Top 40)	21
Netherlands (Single Top 100)	31
Norway (VG-lista)	5
Romania (Romanian Top 100)	3
Scottish Singles Sales (Official Charts)	3
Slovakia Airplay (ČNS IFPI)	14
Spain (Promusicae)	11
Sweden (Sverigetopplistan)	22
Switzerland (Schweizer Hitparade)	1
UK Singles (Official Charts)	2
US Billboard Hot 100	78
US Pop Airplay (Billboard)	40
US Rhythmic Airplay (Billboard)	27

=== Year-end charts ===
Chart (2012)	Position
Austria (Ö3 Austria Top 40)	9
Belgium (Ultratop 50 Flanders)	63
Belgium (Ultratop 50 Wallonia)	50
France (SNEP)	92
Germany (Media Control Charts)	12
Hungary (Rádiós Top 40)	94
Poland (ZPAV)	34
Spain (PROMUSICAE)	50
Sweden (Sverigetopplistan)	78
Switzerland (Schweizer Hitparade)	8
UK Singles (Official Charts Company)	41

== Certifications ==
Region	Certification	Certified units/sales
Austria (IFPI Austria)	Platinum	30,000^{*}
Canada (Music Canada)	Platinum	80,000^{‡}
Germany (BVMI)	3× Gold	450,000^{^}
Italy (FIMI)	Platinum	100,000^{‡}
New Zealand (RMNZ)	Platinum	30,000^{‡}
Spain (Promusicae)	Platinum	100,000^{‡}
Sweden (GLF)	Platinum	40,000^{‡}
Switzerland (IFPI Switzerland)	2× Platinum	60,000^{^}
United Kingdom (BPI)	2× Platinum	1,200,000^{‡}
Streaming
Denmark (IFPI Danmark)	Platinum	1,800,000^{†}
^{*} Sales figures based on certification alone.^{^} Shipments figures based on certification alone.^{‡} Sales+streaming figures based on certification alone.^{†} Streaming-only figures based on certification alone.

== Release history ==
Country	Date	Format	Label
France	29 September 2011	Mainstream radio	Atlantic
France	31 October 2011	Digital download	Atlantic
United States	1 November 2011	Digital download	Atlantic
Canada	1 November 2011	Digital download	Atlantic
Sweden	9 November 2011	Digital download	Atlantic
Belgium	18 November 2011	Digital download	Atlantic
Luxembourg	18 November 2011	Digital download	Atlantic
Netherlands	18 November 2011	Digital download	Atlantic
Switzerland	9 December 2011	Digital download	Atlantic
Finland	2 January 2012	Digital download	Atlantic
Norway	2 January 2012	Digital download	Atlantic
United States	31 January 2012	Mainstream radio	Atlantic
United Kingdom	18 March 2012	Digital download	Atlantic
United States	26 March 2012	Digital download (Pitbull remix)	Atlantic
