= Tomahawk Technique =

Studio album by Sean Paul
- Released: 24 January 2012
- Recorded: 2010-2011
- Genre: Trance'n'B
- Length: 47:25
- Labels: Dutty Rock; VP; Atlantic
- Producers: Benny Blanco; Coppershaun; DJ Ammo; Earl & E; Eau de Gammes; Conroy Forte; Jigzagula; Rico Love; Pierre Medor; Dwayne "D-Town" Nesmith; Sean Paul; Shellback; Stargate

Sean Paul chronology
Imperial Blaze (2009)	Tomahawk Technique (2012)	Full Frequency (2014)

Singles from Tomahawk Technique
- 1. "Got 2 Luv U" Released: 19 July 2011; 2. "She Doesn't Mind" Released: 31 October 2011; 3. "Hold On" Released: 7 February 2012; 4. "Dream Girl" Released: 28 March 2012; 5. "How Deep Is Your Love" Released: 24 July 2012; 6. "Touch the Sky" Released: 3 August 2012

Tomahawk Technique is the fifth studio album by the Jamaican rapper and singer Sean Paul. It was released by his label Dutty Rock Productions, VP Records, and Atlantic Records in several countries beginning on 24 January 2012, with a US release in September 2012. Tomahawk Technique was nominated for Best Reggae Album at the 55th Annual Grammy Awards, earning Paul his second nomination in that category after Imperial Blaze (2009).

== Background ==
Sean said to the music blog Rap-Up that Akon, Stargate, DJ Ammo, Benny Blanco, and Kelly Rowland, would appear on the album. "There's a broadening of my artistry, I’m working with other producers and artists I’ve never worked with," the Jamaican DJ told Reuters at the recent KIIS FM Jingle Bell Ball in Los Angeles. Tomahawk Technique follows the success of the singer's 2009's record Imperial Blaze. For the new CD, he has teamed up with producers Rico Love, Benny Blanco and Stargate, who have been behind artists such as Katy Perry, Rihanna and Natasha Bedingfield, to work on his new album. "What’s going to surprise fans is that there’s a lot more singing, more high notes that I never used to do before," said Paul, adding "it’s a mixture of pop music into dance music."

"I’m trying to bridge the gap, broaden my artistry," Sean told Rap-Up TV. "I’m asking [the producers] to try and make dancehall from their perspective. So it’s sounding more international than dancehall." The album's Japanese version features an upcoming Jamaican singer/songwriter, Zia Benjamin, as well as a remix of the song "Dream Girl" featuring Japanese artiste, Lecca.

== Singles ==
The first single "Got 2 Luv U" features vocals from American singer Alexis Jordan. It was released on 19 July 2011 by Atlantic Records. The song was written by Sean Paul, Ryan Tedder and Stargate, and Stargate produced it. It reached number 1 in Switzerland and the Top 10 in several countries worldwide. "She Doesn't Mind" was released as the second single taken from Tomahawk Technique. It was written by Sean Paul, Shellback and Benny Blanco and was produced by Shellback and Benny Blanco. It was released on 29 September 2011 on French radio stations NRJ & Skyrock, and to iTunes on 31 October. Like its predecessor, "She Doesn't Mind" topped the Swiss Singles Chart as well as the Austrian Singles chart and reached top-ten in many other European territories. "Hold On" was released as the third single in February 2012. It reached number 1 in Belgium and number 35 in France. "Dream Girl (remix)" featuring Lecca was released as a single in Japan on 28 March 2012 while in the United States, "How Deep Is Your Love" featuring Kelly Rowland was released as the fifth single on 24 July 2012. The single has so far reached number seventy-two in Switzerland.

== Critical reception ==
Professional ratings
Aggregate scores
Source	Rating
Metacritic	48/100
Review scores
Source	Rating
AllMusic	3/5 stars
The Guardian	3/5 stars
NME	1.5/5 stars
Now	1/5 stars

The Guardian editor Paul MacInnes described Tomahawk Technique as a "clash of powerful forces: the irrepressible charm of Sean Paul against the intolerable global pop sound. Who will win: the Jamaican star whose 2003 Dutty Rock album brought dancehall to the charts, or the squealing, amped-up trance that is ubiquitous in 2012, from Rihanna to LMFAO? The head says the latter." AllMusic critic David Jeffries wroe that Tomahawk Technique "feels like a play for the world with its Black Eyed Peas and Flo Rida-styled club tracks, the best of which has to be the slow-stepping "Got 2 Luv U." [...] A couple more true dancehall tracks would have made this feel more natural. Straying far from home, Tomahawk Technique isn't an awful Sean Paul album, but it is an odd one."

NME's Rebecca Schiller found that "sadly, his creative decline continues on his fifth studio album, Tomahawk Technique, which is – trance'n'b-meddling album lowlight "Touch The Sky" aside – a lacklustre collection of what sounds like pallid versions of previous hits. Missile launch failed." Anupa Mistry, writing for Now, felt that "it's been sad to see Sean Paul ditch that sexed-up specificity for shameless, sanitized synth pop in the key of, like, everyone else. Past the dancehall signifiers (Paul's increasingly strained lilt and tepid syncopated pulse), the new record is brazenly mediocre. When you’re finished pretending to care, put on Popcaan instead."

== Track listing ==
Tomahawk Technique track listing
No.	Title	Writer(s)	Producer(s)	Length
1.	"Got 2 Luv U" (featuring Alexis Jordan)	Sean Henriques; Ryan Tedder; Mikkel Eriksen; Tor Hermansen	StarGate	3:16
2.	"She Doesn't Mind"	S. Henriques; J. Henriques; Karl Schuster; Benjamin Levin	Shellback; Benny Blanco	3:47
3.	"Body"	S. Henriques; Richard Butler, Jr.; Earl Hood; Eric Goudy II	Rico Love; Earl & E	4:10
4.	"What I Want"	S. Henriques; Butler; Hood; Goudy	Love; Earl & E	3:57
5.	"Won't Stop (Turn Me Out)"	S. Henriques; Butler; Pierre Medor	Love; Medor	4:14
6.	"Dream Girl"	S. Henriques; Butler; Dwayne "D-Town" Nesmith	Love; Nesmith	3:54
7.	"Hold On"	S. Henriques; Butler; Medor	Love; Medor	4:08
8.	"How Deep Is Your Love" (featuring Kelly Rowland)	S. Henriques; J. Henriques; Ester Dean; Eriksen; Hermansen	StarGate	3:20
9.	"Put It on You"	S. Henriques; Daniel Omelio; Ammar Malik; Eriksen; Hermansen	StarGate	3:35
10.	"Roll wid di Don"	S. Henriques; J. Henriques; Shaun Anderson; Nigel Staff	Sean Paul; Jigzagula; Coppershaun	3:42
11.	"Touch the Sky" (featuring DJ Ammo)	S. Henriques; Damien Leroy	DJ Ammo	3:52
12.	"Wedding Crashers" (featuring Future Fambo)	S. Henriques; Wayne Mitchell; Ryan Chin; Jathneil Randal; Warren Gladstone Williams; Conroy Forte	Conroy Forte	3:01
13.	"Waya Waya" (Tal featuring Sean Paul)	S. Henriques; L'Aura Marciano	Eau de Gammes	2:29
Total length:				47:25

Japan limited edition additional tracks
No.	Title	Writer(s)	Producer(s)	Length
13.	"Standing There" (featuring Zia Benjamin)	S. Henriques; Zia Benjamin	JA Productions	3:06
14.	"Dream Girl (Remix)" (featuring Lecca)		Love; Nesmith	3:56
15.	"SP's Dutty Rock Decade Megamix by Delta Force"		Delta Force	9:59

France bonus track
No.	Title	Writer(s)	Producer(s)	Length
13.	"Waya Waya" (Tal featuring Sean Paul)	S. Henriques; L'Aura Marciano	Eau de Gammes	2:29

iTunes pre-order bonus track
No.	Title	Writer(s)	Producer(s)	Length
13.	"Waya Waya" (Tal featuring Sean Paul)	S. Henriques; L'Aura Marciano	Eau de Gammes	2:29
14.	"My Life" (featuring Wayne Marshall)		Jam2	3:02

Notes

- " SP's Dutty Rock Decade Megamix by Delta Force" includes "International Affair", "Like Glue", "Give It Up to Me", "Get Busy", "Ever Blazin'", "Gimme the Light", "We Be Burning", "Temperature", "So Fine", and "Hold My Hand"

== Charts ==
=== Weekly charts ===
Weekly chart performance for Tomahawk Technique
Chart (2012)	Peak position
Australian Urban Albums (ARIA)	11
Austrian Albums (Ö3 Austria)	7
Belgian Albums (Ultratop Flanders)	51
Belgian Albums (Ultratop Wallonia)	10
Dutch Albums (Album Top 100)	39
French Albums (SNEP)	5
German Albums (Offizielle Top 100)	6
Japanese Albums (Oricon)	22
Scottish Albums (Official Charts)	90
Swiss Albums (Schweizer Hitparade)	3
UK Albums (Official Charts)	34
US Reggae Albums (Billboard)	2

=== Year-end charts ===
Year-end chart performance for Tomahawk Technique
Chart (2012)	Position
French Albums (SNEP)	118
German Albums (Offizielle Top 100)	90
Swiss Albums (Schweizer Hitparade)	34

== Certifications ==
Sales and certifications for Tomahawk Technique
Region	Certification	Certified units/sales
France (SNEP)	Gold	50,000^{*}
Germany (BVMI)	Gold	100,000^{‡}
Switzerland (IFPI Switzerland)	Gold	15,000^{^}
^{*} Sales figures based on certification alone.^{^} Shipments figures based on certification alone.^{‡} Sales+streaming figures based on certification alone.

== Release history ==
Tomahawk Technique release history
Region	Date	Format(s)	Label(s)	Ref.
Japan	24 January 2012	Digital download	Atlantic Records	
Sweden	24 January 2012	Digital download	Atlantic Records	
Spain	24 January 2012	Digital download	Atlantic Records	
Finland	24 January 2012	Digital download	Atlantic Records	
Denmark	24 January 2012	Digital download	Atlantic Records	
Portugal	24 January 2012	Digital download	Atlantic Records	
Norway	24 January 2012	Digital download	Atlantic Records	
New Zealand	24 January 2012	Digital download	Atlantic Records	
Netherlands	24 January 2012	Digital download	Atlantic Records	
Luxembourg	24 January 2012	Digital download	Atlantic Records	
Italy	24 January 2012	Digital download	Atlantic Records	
Belgium	27 January 2012	Digital download	Atlantic Records	
France	27 January 2012	Digital download	Atlantic Records	
Switzerland	27 January 2012	Digital download	Atlantic Records	
Austria	17 February 2012	CD; digital download	Atlantic Records	
Germany	17 February 2012	CD; digital download	Atlantic Records	
Japan	22 February 2012	CD	Atlantic Records	
Ireland	2 April 2012	CD; digital download	Atlantic Records	
United Kingdom	2 April 2012	CD; digital download	Atlantic Records	
Australia	6 April 2012	CD; digital download	Atlantic Records	
United States	18 September 2012	CD; digital download	Atlantic Records	
