= Got 2 Luv U =

2011 Single by Sean Paul featuring Alexis Jordan

Single by Sean Paul featuring Alexis Jordan

from the album Tomahawk Technique
- Released: 19 July 2011
- Recorded: 2010–2011
- Genre: Electropop; R&B
- Length: 3:16
- Label: Atlantic
- Songwriters: Sean Paul Henriques; Ryan Tedder; Mikkel S. Eriksen; Tor Erik Hermansen
- Producer: Stargate

Sean Paul singles chronology
"Do You Remember" (2009)	"Got 2 Luv U" (2011)	"She Doesn't Mind" (2011)

Alexis Jordan singles chronology
"Hush Hush" (2011)	"Got 2 Luv U" (2011)	"Acid Rain" (2013)

Music video
- "Got 2 Luv U" (Official) on YouTube

"Got 2 Luv U"is the first single from Jamaican recording artist Sean Paul's fifth studio album Tomahawk Technique. The song features vocals from American singer Alexis Jordan. It was released on 19 July 2011 by Atlantic Records. The song was featured in 2012 film Magic Mike.

== Song information ==
Sean Paul co-wrote the song with OneRepublic lead singer Ryan Tedder and Norwegian production duo Stargate. Production was also handled by Stargate. Tedder originally wrote and recorded the song as a break-up song called "Not To Love You" (uploads of this version can be found on YouTube). However, when it was given to Sean Paul and Alexis Jordan, the song was changed into a love song. The "N" in "Not" was changed to a "G" to make the word "Got", thus creating its current title. Also, Paul wrote and recorded two new verses to replace Tedder's original first two verses, while Jordan sings Tedder's original chorus and third verse with different lyrics. In July 2026, Sean Paul received two Platinum certifications from the British Phonographic Industry (BPI) for the singles "Got 2 Luv U" featuring Alexis Jordan and "Do You Remember" by Jay Sean featuring Sean Paul and Lil Jon, recognizing each for exceeding 600,000 combined sales and streams in the United Kingdom. "Got 2 Luv U", released in 2011 as the lead single from Tomahawk Technique, peaked at number 11 on the UK Singles Chart and achieved commercial success across Europe.

== Music video ==
The video was filmed on 29 August 2011 at the Hard Rock Cafe in Las Vegas and the Vanity Nightclub that is under the same ownership as the Hard Rock Cafe hotel. The music video was uploaded to YouTube on 15 September 2011 at a total length of three minutes and thirty-four seconds. It was directed by Ben Mor. As of January 2024, the music video has over 500 million views.

== Track listing ==
- Digital download
1. "Got 2 Luv U" – 3:16
- German CD single
1. "Got 2 Luv U" – 3:16
2. "Ready Fi Dis" (bonus track) – 2:44

== Charts ==
=== Weekly charts ===
Chart (2011)	Peak position
Australia (ARIA)	26
Australia (ARIA Urban)	1
Austria (Ö3 Austria Top 40)	7
Belgium (Ultratop 50 Flanders)	13
Belgium (Ultratop 50 Wallonia)	4
Canada Hot 100 (Billboard)	69
Czech Republic Airplay (ČNS IFPI)	2
Finland (Suomen virallinen lista)	12
France (SNEP)	4
Germany (GfK)	3
Hungary (Editors' Choice Top 40)	23
Ireland (IRMA)	43
Italy (FIMI)	94
Luxembourg (Billboard)	3
Netherlands (Dutch Top 40)	6
Netherlands (Single Top 100)	9
Norway (VG-lista)	8
Poland (Dance Top 50)	2
Romania TV Airplay (Media Forest)	1
Scotland Singles (Official Charts)	2
Spain (Promusicae)	8
Spain (Airplay Chart)	2
Switzerland (Schweizer Hitparade)	1
UK Singles (Official Charts)	11
US Billboard Hot 100	84
US Bubbling Under R&B/Hip-Hop Singles (Billboard)	2
US Rap Songs (Billboard)	20
US Latin Pop Songs (Billboard)	39
US Rhythmic Airplay (Billboard)	18
Venezuela Pop Rock General (Record Report)	1

Chart (2012)	Peak position
Spanish Airplay Chart (Promusicae)	1

=== Year-end charts ===
Chart (2011)	Position
Austria (Ö3 Austria Top 40)	53
Belgium (Ultratop Flanders)	79
Belgium (Ultratop Wallonia)	87
France (SNEP)	39
Germany (Official German Charts)	30
Netherlands (Dutch Top 40)	20
Netherlands (Single Top 100)	45
Poland Dance (ZPAV)	8
Romania (Romanian Top 100)	50
Spain (PROMUSICAE)	49
Switzerland (Schweizer Hitparade)	19
UK Singles (OCC)	171

Chart (2012)	Position
Poland (ZPAV)	4
Spain (PROMUSICAE)	41

== Certifications ==
Region	Certification	Certified units/sales
Australia (ARIA)	Platinum	70,000^{^}
Austria (IFPI Austria)	Gold	15,000^{*}
Canada (Music Canada)	Gold	40,000^{‡}
Denmark (IFPI Danmark)	Gold	45,000^{‡}
Germany (BVMI)	Platinum	300,000^{^}
New Zealand (RMNZ)	Gold	15,000^{‡}
Spain (Promusicae) 2011–2012 digital sales	Gold	20,000^{*}
Spain (Promusicae) sales + streams since 2015	Gold	50,000^{‡}
Switzerland (IFPI Switzerland)	Platinum	30,000^{^}
United Kingdom (BPI)	Platinum	600,000^{‡}
^{*} Sales figures based on certification alone.^{^} Shipments figures based on certification alone.^{‡} Sales+streaming figures based on certification alone.

== Release history ==
Region	Date	Format	Label
Worldwide	19 July 2011	Digital download	Atlantic Records
Germany	16 September 2011	CD single	Atlantic Records
