= Alexis Jordan (album) =

Studio album by Alexis Jordan
- Released: February 25, 2011
- Recorded: January 2007 – October 2010
- Genre: Dance-pop; pop; R&B
- Length: 40:33
- Label: StarRoc; Roc Nation; Columbia; Sony
- Producer: Stargate (also exec.); deadmau5; Sandy Vee; Nightwatch; METI & Rigo; Espionage

Singles from Alexis Jordan
- 1. "Happiness" Released: September 7, 2010; 2. "Good Girl" Released: February 18, 2011; 3. "Hush Hush" Released: June 12, 2011

Alexis Jordan is the only studio album by American singer Alexis Jordan. It was released from February 25, 2011, through Stargate's StarRoc, a division of Jay-Z's Roc Nation and Columbia Records, and Sony Music. After signing with Jay-Z's Roc Nation label in March 2010, Jordan began work on her debut album, collaborating with Norwegian production duo Stargate, as well as producers Sandy Vee, Nightwatch, and Espionage. A dance-pop record that blends elements of electro pop and R&B, Alexis Jordan was recorded over a period of nearly four years, from January 2007 to October 2010.

The album received generally positive reviews, with critics praising its upbeat energy and lyrics—one noting they could "melt an ice-cold heart," and another calling it "dancefloor friendly." However, some felt it lacked a distinct style and drew comparisons to Rihanna. Alexis Jordan debuted at number nine in the United Kingdom, where it was certified Gold by the British Phonographic Industry (BPI). The album also reached number eleven in Australia and landed within the top 30 in both Ireland and the Netherlands.

Alexis Jordan was preceded by lead single "Happiness." The song became a number-one hit in Norway and the Netherlands and reached the top 10 in several other countries, while also peaking at number one on the US Hot Dance Club Songs chart. The album's second single "Good Girl" peaked at number six on the UK Singles Chart, with third and final single, "Hush Hush" reaching the 20 in the Netherlands. It also charted in Ireland and the United Kingdom almost one month before its official release.

== Background ==
Jordan began writing songs while she was in third grade. At the age of 11, she moved with her parents and three younger siblings Taylor, Malichai and Malcolm to Santa Clarita, California, to pursue a career in the arts, and at the age of 12, Jordan served as an opening act for Smokey Robinson at a Stevie Wonder tribute concert. In 2006 Jordan auditioned for the first season of America's Got Talent. She sang Whitney Houston's "I Have Nothing" at her audition and made it through to next round, only to be eliminated in the semifinals. After being eliminated from the show, Jordan and her family moved to Atlanta to be closer to the music industry. While there, she began to upload cover songs on YouTube while submitting demos. By 2008, Jordan's YouTube page was racking up millions of views. The exposure led Jordan to the attention of production team Stargate who called her to fly to New York and record a few songs with them. While in the studio, rapper Jay-Z walked in, which ultimately resulted in Jordan becoming the first artist signed to the new, Sony Music-affiliated label, StarRoc/Roc Nation – a joint venture between Stargate and Jay-Z's Roc Nation label.

== Singles ==
"Happiness" was released as the album's lead single on September 7, 2010. It peaked at number three in the UK and Australia and became a top-ten hit in Belgium, New Zealand, and Poland. The song also peaked at number one on the US Hot Dance Club Songs chart. The song held the position for one week before losing it to Wynter Gordon's "Dirty Talk". In the United Kingdom, "Happiness" debuted and peaked at number three for the week ending November 13, 2010. In Ireland, it peaked at number thirty-one on the Irish Singles Chart. On the European Hot 100 Singles chart, "Happiness" reached number 13. In Australia, the song debuted on the ARIA Singles Chart at number 25 on December 19, 2010, before peaking at number three in its sixth week on the chart. It has since been certified triple platinum by the Australian Recording Industry Association (ARIA) for sales of 210,000 units. In April 2011, the song reached number one for six weeks on the Dutch Single Top 100, staying on the chart for 44 weeks in total.

"Good Girl" was released as the second single from the album on February 18, 2011. On February 24, 2011, "Good Girl" debuted at number 18 in Ireland, and has since peaked at number 15. In the United Kingdom, the song debuted at number six on February 27, 2011, becoming Jordan's second top-ten single in the UK. In the United States, the song debuted at number 14 on Billboard's Hot Dance Club Songs chart on the issue dated March 19, 2011. It reached the top of the chart on the issue dated April 30, 2011, becoming Jordan's second consecutive number-one hit in the US.

"Hush Hush" was released as the third single from the album. It was released in the United Kingdom on June 12, 2011. The song peaked at number 36 in Ireland, and 66 in the UK from strong downloads from the album, almost one month before the official release.

== Critical reception ==
Professional ratings
Review scores
Source	Rating
AllMusic	3.5/5 stars
The Border Mail	3/5 stars
The Guardian	2/5 stars
OK!	4/5 stars

The album received mixed reviews from most music critics, with many comparing the sound of the album to Barbadian R&B singer Rihanna but criticizing the album for being too predictable. Natalie Shaw of BBC Music categorized the album as bubblegum pop and praised its lyrics, opining "Her lyrics are unbridled enough to melt an ice-cold heart – she sings about wanting to walk in high heels, and how she enjoys listening to her crush's voice as he talks to her on the phone. While this may sound unbearably twee, it's that very focus on a pure, single-minded crush that makes it; the mood and upbeat tempo of this album as a whole has all of the excitement of that very feeling." The Guardian's Caroline Sullivan dismissed Alexis Jordan's voice, writing "Jordan is reputed to have a voice worth hearing, but here it's been AutoTuned or buried under layers of Stargate's trademark clattery beats, to the point where any distinctiveness is lost." Matthew Laidlow of Virgin Media felt the album was sufficient for a debut release but criticized the lack of a consistent dance-pop sound, remarking "Instead [...] there is a collection of songs that just cast the impression the producers working with Alexis Jordan tried all sorts of sounds to suit her, couldn't nail a distinct style and just put the collective efforts on the album."

Hermione Hoby of The Observer gave the album a negative review, saying "Jordan's only 18 but has worked for almost half a decade to release this debut. [...] So it's a shame that she doesn't have much more to say here than "I want to walk in the club with my high heels on." Like Jordan's naughty-girl/good-girl shtick, these tunes are depressingly predictable." In his review for The Border Mail, Jamie Horne compared the songs "Habit" and "How You Like Me Now" to Rihanna, noting the latter song's similarity to "Umbrella" (2007). He found the album "dancefloor friendly", commenting how Jordan "seems to be joining R&B stars like Chris Brown, Rihanna and Usher [who] have all upped their BPMs of late." OK! Magazine gave the album a positive review, judging "It's jam-packed with ridiculously catchy electro-infused pop that's likely to get stuck in your head for days. Highlights include Good Girl, Hush Hush and Happiness, any of which would shoot straight to the top of the charts if released by Girls Aloud or The Saturdays." AllMusic editor Jon O'Brien found that "rather than the karaoke-style treatment" afforded to other talent show contestant's debuts, the tracks on Alexis Jordan were "vibrant and inventive set of original songs which perfectly complement Jordan's impressively pure but powerful tones." He called the album a "pretty solid, upbeat debut which reveals that the cutesy Christina Aguilera soundalike we first saw five years ago has blossomed into a mature and self-assured vocalist who is more than capable of competing with the pop divas she once idolized."

== Commercial performance ==
Alexis Jordan debuted at number 28 on the Irish Albums Chart on March 4, 2011. Two days later, it entered the UK Albums Chart at number 9. In Australia, the album made its debut at number 11. On April 30, 2011, it also entered the Dutch Albums Chart at number 80. In its 13th week on the chart, the album shot from number 72 to 23, reaching its peak of number 21 two weeks later. Alexis Jordan was eventually certified Silver by the British Phonographic Industry (BPI) on March 28, 2014.

== Track listing ==
Alexis Jordan track listing
No.	Title	Writer(s)	Producer(s)	Length
1.	"Happiness"	Autumn Rowe; Mikkel S. Eriksen; Tor Erik Hermansen; Joel Zimmerman	Stargate; deadmau5	4:03
2.	"Good Girl"	Autumn Rowe; Eriksen; Hermansen; Sandy Wilhelm; Espen Lind; Amund Björklund	Stargate; Sandy Vee	3:56
3.	"How You Like Me Now"	August Rigo; Eriksen; Hermansen	Stargate	3:13
4.	"Say That"	Johntá Austin; Eriksen; Hermansen; Lind; Björklund	Stargate	3:23
5.	"Love Mist"	Eriksen; Hermansen	Stargate	3:19
6.	"Habit"	Crystal Johnson; Eriksen; Hermansen	Stargate	3:35
7.	"Hush Hush"	Autumn Rowe; Eriksen; Hermansen; Wilhelm	Stargate; Vee	3:43
8.	"High Road"	Nik Roos; Martijn van Sonderen; Thijs de Vlieger; LaShawn Daniels	Nightwatch	3:07
9.	"Shout Shout"	August Rigo; Eriksen; Hermansen; Roland Orzabal; Ian Stanley	METI & Rigo; Stargate (remix)	4:08
10.	"Laying Around"	Shaffer Smith; Eriksen; Hermansen	Stargate	4:01
11.	"The Air That I Breathe"	Lind; Björklund; Claude Kelly	Espionage	4:06

German second edition additional track
No.	Title	Writer(s)	Producer(s)	Length
12.	"Happiness" (Dave Audé mix)	Autumn Rowe; Zimmerman; Eriksen; Hermansen	Stargate; deadmau5; Dave Audé (remix)	3:23

Notes

- "Happiness" contains an excerpt of "Brazil (2nd Edit)" as performed and written by deadmau5.
- "Shout Shout" contains elements from "Shout" as performed by Tears for Fears and written by Roland Orzabal and Ian Stanley.

== Charts ==
Weekly chart performance for Alexis Jordan
Chart (2011)	Peak position
Australian Albums (ARIA)	11
Australian Urban Albums (ARIA)	5
Belgian Albums (Ultratop Flanders)	87
Dutch Albums (Album Top 100)	21
Irish Albums (IRMA)	28
Polish Albums (ZPAV)	62
Scottish Albums (OCC)	9
Swiss Albums (Schweizer Hitparade)	96
UK Albums (OCC)	9

== Certifications ==
Certifications for Alexis Jordan
Region	Certification	Certified units/sales
United Kingdom (BPI)	Silver	60,000^{*}
^{*} Sales figures based on certification alone.

== Release history ==
Release formats for Alexis Jordan
Region	Date	Format	Ref(s)
Ireland	February 25, 2011	CD, digital download	
United Kingdom	February 28, 2011	CD, digital download	
Australia	March 4, 2011	CD, digital download	
Germany	April 29, 2011	CD, digital download	
Poland	May 16, 2011	CD	
Japan	June 21, 2011	Digital download	
Taiwan	June 22, 2011	Digital download	
