= Happiness (Alexis Jordan song) =

Single by Alexis Jordan

from the album Alexis Jordan
- Released: September 7, 2010
- Genre: Dance-pop; house
- Length: 4:02
- Label: StarRoc; Roc Nation
- Songwriters: Joel Zimmerman; Mikkel S. Eriksen; Tor Erik Hermansen; Autumn Rowe
- Producers: Stargate; Deadmau5

Alexis Jordan singles chronology
"Happiness" (2010)	"Good Girl" (2011)

"Happiness" is the debut single by American singer and 2006 America's Got Talent contestant Alexis Jordan. It is the lead single from her self-titled debut studio album, released in the United States on September 7, 2010. The upbeat dance-pop and house rhythm behind the track was entirely sampled from electronic artist Deadmau5's "Brazil (2nd Edit)" (released two years prior to "Happiness"). The lyrics were written by Autumn Rowe, and the track was re-edited for the lyrics by Stargate.

"Happiness" was generally well received by many critics, with some complimenting Jordan's vocal abilities. In the United States, the song topped the Hot Dance Club Songs chart, giving Jordan her first number one on the chart. It reached number 1 in the charts in the Netherlands (staying there for 10 weeks and eventually becoming the best song of 2011 in this chart) and has also charted in the top five in countries such as the United Kingdom and Australia. An accompanying music video, directed by Aggressive, sees Jordan and her love interest meeting, separating and making up. It was noted for its similarities to Kylie Minogue's "Can't Get You Out of My Head". The Dave Audé Club Mix was the official song of the 2011 FIFA Women's World Cup in Germany.

== Background ==
After being eliminated from the first season of America's Got Talent in 2006, Jordan began posting videos of herself singing cover songs on YouTube, of which she later became a viral sensation for. After receiving a phone call from Stargate, Jordan flew over to New York City to record a few songs with them. It was then announced in the press in March 2010 that she had signed to StarRoc/Roc Nation after Jay-Z had noticed her in the studio with Stargate.

== Composition ==
Alexis Jordan "Happiness" (2010)
A sample of the song, described as an "irresistible pop anthem".

"Happiness" is an upbeat dance-pop song, influenced by house music. The song has a "simple, pleasant melody" and has been described as an "upbeat track tinged with full good electronica". The music used was Deadmau5's "Brazil (2nd Edit)", which was re-edited for the vocals by Stargate. In explaining the song, Jordan revealed it is about "finding love in yourself before you find it in someone else, because a lot of people lose themselves when they fall in love, and they forget who they are, and that's what you've gotta do. You've gotta find someone who loves you for you". Songwriter Autumn Rowe has said in an interview that "Happiness" has an African influence.

== Critical reception ==
Fraser McAlpine of BBC Music awarded the song four stars and said "If Madonna had put this out, it would be hailed as one of the best songs of her long and varied career. And she possibly would struggle to get the crystal purity of those top notes, which means Alexis is officially better than Madonna". Bill Lamb of About.com praised the song for its "danceable beat" and "simple, pleasant melody" but also called the song an "insubstantial fluff" and that its "sound lacks any particular distinction". Kevin O'Donnell of NPR Music called the song an "irresistible pop anthem" and said "this is disco music for a Disney audience — and, amazingly enough, it works".

Nick Levine of Digital Spy awarded the song five stars, describing the song as a "tale of romantic regret, realisation and ultimately exultation". Andrew Butler of Pink Paper magazine was impressed with the song, stating "It really does make you feel happy, through a mixture of its fabulously put together lyrics, infectious humming and danceable tunes". Emma Johnson of Liverpool Echo called the song "one of the most infectious tracks of the year", while AOL Radio named it the sixth top dance song of 2010.

== Chart performance ==
In the United States, "Happiness" debuted on the Hot Dance Club Songs chart at number 40. It climbed the chart in subsequent weeks and peaked at the top position for the week, July 17, 2010. The song held the position for one week before losing it to Wynter Gordon's "Dirty Talk". Also in the US, the song reached number one on the Hot Dance Airplay chart. In the United Kingdom, the song debuted, and peaked, at number three on the UK Singles Chart for the week ending November 13, 2010. It made its Irish debut at number 31 and spent 20 weeks inside the top 50. and peaked at number thirty-one. On the European Hot 100 Singles chart, "Happiness" reached number 13. In Australia, the song debuted on the ARIA Singles Chart at number 25 on December 19, 2010, before peaking at number three in its sixth week on the chart. It has since been certified triple platinum by the Australian Recording Industry Association (ARIA) for sales of 210,000 units. In April 2011, the song reached number one for ten weeks in the Dutch Top 40 and It became the biggest hit of 2011 in the Netherlands that year (staying in the top 40 for 30 weeks).

== Music video ==
Two frames showing Jordan in the backseat of her orange car (upper) and at a swimming pool with four back-up dancers (lower)

The music video for "Happiness" was directed by Aggressive and premiered online on May 20, 2010. While being interviewed, Jordan described the video as "fun, colorful, and young. The video makes you want to dance. I wanted to do something unique. I want to be an artist that leaves a mark on the industry".

The video is set in a colorful city and has a futuristic theme to it. The storyline of the video begins with Jordan dropping off her boyfriend (portrayed by Tom Williamson) at a bus stop, as they appear to be breaking up. She is seen sitting in the backseat of her orange AMC Pacer, and starts to sing the song's first verse, just as the wind begins to pick up, sliding her car and the bus stop, where her boyfriend is at, in opposite directions. Throughout the video, the city moves in motion. It is intercut with other scenes, including Jordan dancing with four other back-up dancers at a swimming pool, a man reading a newspaper while holding a Dalmatian dog by its leash, and also a woman with a few shopping bags. During the car scenes, Jordan sees flashbacks of her boyfriend in the car's rear-view mirror. She later realizes that he makes her happy and moves to the driver's seat, to stop the car. Jordan then reverses the car, sending her back to the bus stop to reunite with her boyfriend. As the pair reconcile at the bus stop, the wind causes the car and the bus stop to slide off again, as the couple stare bewildered at the sight.

Some critics compared the video to Kylie Minogue's "Can't Get You Out of My Head" clip, due to both videos having a futuristic theme, with similar car scenes. MTV's Chris Ryan said "the video has a real "Can't Get You Out of My Head"/altered reality vibe to it, with everyday scenes played out with a dreamlike quality".

== Track listings ==
- Digital download
1. "Happiness" – 4:03
2. "Happiness" (Extended Club Mix) – 7:24
3. "Happiness" (Official Music Video) – 4:12
- UK and Ireland digital EP
1. "Happiness" – 4:03
2. "Happiness" (Michael Woods Remix) – 7:42
3. "Happiness" (Extended Club Mix) – 7:24
4. "Happiness" (Wideboys Club Mix) – 5:35
5. "Happiness" (Dave Audé Club Mix) – 8:38
- US Remixes EP
1. "Happiness" (Jump Smokers Extended Mix) – 4:12
2. "Happiness" (Wideboys Club Mix) – 5:35
3. "Happiness" (Extended Club Mix) – 7:24
4. "Happiness" (Dave Audé Club Mix) – 8:38
- Australia and New Zealand digital EP
1. "Happiness" – 4:03
2. "Happiness" (Wideboys Radio Edit) – 4:08
3. "Happiness" (Jump Smokers Radio Edit) – 3:47
- Germany CD single
1. "Happiness" – 4:03
2. "Happiness" (Dave Audé Radio Edit) – 4:19
- Happiness (Dave Audé Remix) [Radio Edit] - Single
1. "Happiness" (Dave Audé Remix) [Radio Edit] - 3:24

== Charts ==
=== Weekly charts ===
Chart (2010–11)	Peak position
Australia (ARIA)	3
Belgium (Ultratop 50 Flanders)	3
Belgium (Ultratop 50 Wallonia)	9
European Hot 100 Singles (Billboard)	13
Germany (GfK)	57
Ireland (IRMA)	31
Italy (FIMI)	71
Netherlands (Dutch Top 40)	1
Netherlands (Single Top 100)	1
New Zealand (Recorded Music NZ)	8
Norway (VG-lista)	1
Poland Airplay (ZPAV)	2
Poland Dance (ZPAV)	19
Scottish Singles Sales (Official Charts)	4
Switzerland (Schweizer Hitparade)	44
UK Hip Hop/R&B (Official Charts)	1
UK Singles (Official Charts)	3
US Dance Club Songs (Billboard)	1

=== Year-end charts ===
Chart (2010)	Position
UK Singles (Official Charts Company)	80
US Dance Club Songs (Billboard)	9
Chart (2011)	Position
Australia (ARIA)	26
Belgium (Ultratop Flanders)	34
Belgium (Ultratop Wallonia)	52
Netherlands (Dutch Top 40)	1
Netherlands (Single Top 100)	2
UK Singles (Official Charts Company)	139

== Certifications ==
Region	Certification	Certified units/sales
Australia (ARIA)	3× Platinum	210,000^{^}
Belgium (BRMA)	Gold	15,000^{*}
New Zealand (RMNZ)	Gold	7,500^{*}
United Kingdom (BPI)	Platinum	600,000^{‡}
^{*} Sales figures based on certification alone.^{^} Shipments figures based on certification alone.^{‡} Sales+streaming figures based on certification alone.

== Release history ==
Country	Date	Format ^{†}	Label
United States	September 7, 2010	Remix EP	StarRoc, Roc Nation
Ireland	October 29, 2010	Main version, extended play	Sony Music
United Kingdom	October 29, 2010	Main version, extended play	Sony Music
Australia	December 10, 2010	Extended play	Sony Music
New Zealand	December 10, 2010	Extended play	Sony Music
Taiwan	December 12, 2010	Digital download	Sony Music
Japan	January 2, 2011	Digital download	Sony Music
Germany	March 18, 2011	CD single	
Germany	July 15, 2011	CD single (Dave Audé Mix)	

- ^{†} All releases are via digital download unless otherwise stated.

== See also ==
- List of Dutch Top 40 number-one singles of 2011
- List of number-one dance singles of 2010 (U.S.)
- List of number-one dance airplay hits of 2010 (U.S.)
