= Good Girl (Alexis Jordan song) =

2011 single by Alexis Jordan

Single by Alexis Jordan

from the album Alexis Jordan
- Released: February 18, 2011
- Recorded: Westlake Studios; (California, United States); Roc The Mic Studios; (New York City, United States)
- Genre: Dance-pop
- Length: 3:56 (album version); 3:40 (radio edit)
- Label: StarRoc; Roc Nation; Columbia
- Songwriters: Autumn Rowe; Mikkel S. Eriksen; Tor Erik Hermansen; Sandy Wilhelm; Espen Lind; Amund Björklund
- Producers: Stargate; Sandy Vee

Alexis Jordan singles chronology
"Happiness" (2010)	"Good Girl" (2011)	"Hush Hush" (2011)

"Good Girl" is a song by American recording artist Alexis Jordan, taken from her self-titled debut album. It was released as the album's second single on February 18, 2011. The dance-pop song was written by Autumn Rowe, Stargate, Sandy Vee and Espionage, and it was produced by Stargate and Sandy Vee. Jordan has said the song is a "girl’s anthem" about how "you can better yourself, even if your past isn’t as good as your present." "Good Girl" debuted at number six in the United Kingdom, and charted at number fifteen in Ireland. In the United States, the song peaked at the top of the Hot Dance Club Songs chart.

== Critical reception ==
Nick Levine of Digital Spy awarded the song four out of five stars, and wrote "Call us naive, but with beats this struttable, verses so irresistibly bop-friendly and that, ahem, killer chorus, who wouldn't want to take a chance on her?"

== Chart performance ==
On February 24, 2011 "Good Girl" debuted at number eighteen in Ireland, and has since peaked at number fifteen. In the United Kingdom, the song debuted at number six for the week ending date March 5, 2011, becoming Jordan's second top-ten single in the UK. In the United States, the song debuted at number fourteen on Billboard's Hot Dance Club Songs chart on the issue dated March 19, 2011. It reached the top of the chart on the issue dated April 30, 2011, becoming Jordan's second consecutive number-one hit in the US.

== Music video ==
The music video was directed by Erik White, it premiered on 25 January 2011 and was filmed late in December 2010. The video commences with Jordan walking down a street wearing sunglasses, which is followed by the first scene in which Jordan begins to sing. The singer is shown dancing in an eccentrically choreographed scene; one of which is with her backup dancers, and the other, which was with a male dancer Hefa Leone Tuita, in which Jordan and the male dancer were dancing in sync. Scenes also included Jordan dressed as a high-school girl eating an apple, and Jordan wearing an outfit consisting of PVC on a motorbike chewing bubble-gum. The video ends with screen-shots from different scenes in the video, followed by Jordan ruffling her hair, in which the camera zooms out and the text reads "ALEXIS JORDAN".

== Track listing ==
- UK digital EP
1. "Good Girl" – 3:56
2. "Good Girl" (Freemason's Radio Edit) – 3:31
3. "Good Girl" (Kim Fai Radio Edit) – 3:55
4. "Good Girl" (Freemason's Club Edit) – 8:47
5. "Good Girl" (Kim Fai Club Edit) – 6:52
- Australian digital download
1. "Good Girl" – 3:56
2. "Good Girl" (Freemason's Radio Edit) – 3:31
3. "Good Girl" (Kim Fai Radio Edit) – 3:55

== Credits and personnel ==
- Autumn Rowe – songwriter
- StarGate (Mikkel S. Eriksen and Tor Erik Hermansen) – songwriter, producer and instrumentation
- Sandy Vee – songwriter, producer and instrumentation
- Espionage (Espen Lind and Amund Björklund) – songwriter
- Mikkel S. Eriksen – recording
- Miles Walker – recording assistant
- Antonio Resendiz – recording assistant
- Phil Tan – mixing
- Damien Lewis – additional and assistant engineering
- Espen Lind – guitar
- Tom Coyne – mastering

Credits adapted from Alexis Jordan album booklet.

== Charts ==
Chart (2011)	Peak position
Australia (ARIA)	40
Belgium (Ultratip Bubbling Under Flanders)	9
Belgium (Ultratip Bubbling Under Wallonia)	46
Ireland (IRMA)	15
Netherlands (Dutch Top 40)	25
Poland (Dance Top 50)	42
Scotland Singles (OCC)	3
Slovakia Airplay (ČNS IFPI)	49
UK Singles (OCC)	6
US Hot Dance Club Songs (Billboard)	1

- "Good Girl" charted on the Ultratip Flanders chart in Belgium and peaked at 9, which is the same as charting on the Ultratop 50 at 59.

=== Year-end charts ===
Chart (2011)	Position
UK Singles (Official Charts Company)	94
US Hot Dance Club Songs (Billboard)	25

== Certifications ==
Region	Certification	Certified units/sales
United Kingdom (BPI)	Silver	200,000^{*}
^{*} Sales figures based on certification alone.

== Release history ==
Region	Date	Format
United Kingdom	February 18, 2011	Digital download
Ireland	February 18, 2011	Digital download
Australia	March 4, 2011	Digital download
Japan	May 29, 2011	Digital download

== See also ==
- List of number-one dance singles of 2011 (U.S.)
