= Hush Hush (Alexis Jordan song) =

2011 single by Alexis Jordan

Single by Alexis Jordan

from the album Alexis Jordan
- Released: June 10, 2011
- Recorded: Roc the Mic Studios; (New York City, United States); The Bunker Studios; (Paris, France)
- Genre: Dance-pop
- Length: 3:42
- Label: StarRoc; Roc Nation; Columbia
- Songwriters: Autumn Rowe; Mikkel S. Eriksen; Tor Erik Hermansen; Sandy Wilhelm
- Producers: Stargate; Sandy Vee

Alexis Jordan singles chronology
"Good Girl" (2011)	"Hush Hush" (2011)	"Got 2 Luv U" (2011)

"Hush Hush" is a song by American recording artist Alexis Jordan, taken from her self-titled debut album (2011). It was released as the album's third and final single on June 10, 2011. The dance-pop song was written by Autumn Rowe, Stargate and Sandy Vee. Alexis called the song "feisty" and that it was a song that "unleashes a fiery side of her personality".

== Background ==
Speaking in May 2011 to urban writer Pete Lewis of Blues & Soul, Jordan described the lyrical background to the song: "It's really dealing with the situation where - if you've been hurt, or someone's treated you wrong or cheated on you in a relationship - you're basically saying 'Be quiet! I don't wanna hear it! I'm gonna move ON!'... So what I particularly liked about the song is that it's a very powerful statement for anybody who's been in that kind of situation."

== Production ==
"Hush Hush" is written by Autumn Rowe, StarGate and Sandy Vee, and it was produced by Stargate and Sandy Vee. When premiering the song with Digital Spy, Jordan discussed the song. "The thing I love about this track is that it has a dance beat that is irresistible. You can't not dance to it! It's also quite fierce and feisty, but in a fun and positive way." Discussing the recording process of the record, she insisted: "It was a very calm and fun process. I was always in the studio smiling! It was something that I felt so blessed to be doing - it never felt like a chore. I am thankful to the whole team around me though, we mesh very well together."

== Reception ==
=== Critical reception ===
BBC Music described the production as "clattery", while praising the strength and soul in Jordan's vocals as "empowering". Lewis Corner of Digital Spy gave the song four stars out of five and wrote, ""Hush, hush, hush/ You know I'm coming for ya/ Tough, tough, tough," she threatens over a relentless Stargate-helmed disco riff and dance beats that pack more camp oomph than a Pineapple Dance Studios session with Louie Spence." 4Music's David Griffiths called the song "another dancefloor-friendly pop track that will have you on your feet in seconds."

=== Chart performance ===
The song peaked at number 36 in Ireland, and 66 in the UK from strong downloads from the album, almost one month before the official release. The song peaked on number 12 in The Netherlands.

== Music video ==
The music video for the song was uploaded to YouTube on 6 May 2011 and lasts four minutes and six seconds. The music video was directed by Clifton Bell.

== Track listing ==
- UK Digital EP
1. "Hush Hush" – 3:42
2. "Hush Hush" (Tom Neville's Turned Up to 11 Remix) – 6:21
3. "Hush Hush" (Cahill Full On Club Remix) – 7:10
4. "Hush Hush" (Cahill Full On Dub Remix) – 7:10
5. "Hush Hush" (Cahill Lounge Remix) – 7:11
6. "Hush Hush" (Full Intention Club Remix) – 6:10
- Australian Digital EP
1. "Hush Hush" – 3:42
2. "Hush Hush" (Cahill Full On Remix Edit) – 3:29
3. "Hush Hush" (Full Intention Radio Remix) – 4:54
4. "Hush Hush" (Tom Neville's Turned Up To 11 Radio Remix) – 3:42
5. "Hush Hush" (Stargate Extended Mix) – 5:20

== Credits and personnel ==
- Autumn Rowe – songwriter
- StarGate (Mikkel S. Eriksen and Tor Erik Hermansen) – songwriter, producer and instrumentation
- Sandy Vee – songwriter, producer, recording, mixing and instrumentation
- Mikkel S. Eriksen – recording
- Phil Tan – mixing
- Damien Lewis – additional and assistant engineering
- Tom Coyne – mastering

Credits adapted from Alexis Jordan album booklet.

== Charts ==
=== Weekly charts ===
Chart (2011)	Peak position
Belgium (Ultratip Bubbling Under Flanders)	5
Ireland (IRMA)	36
Netherlands (Dutch Top 40)	12
Netherlands (Single Top 100)	22
Poland Dance (ZPAV)	50
Slovakia Airplay (ČNS IFPI)	86
UK Singles (Official Charts)	66

=== Year-end charts ===
Chart (2011)	Position
Netherlands (Dutch Top 40)	76

== Release history ==
Region	Date	Format
Australia	June 10, 2011	Digital download
Ireland	June 10, 2011	Digital download
United Kingdom	June 12, 2011	Digital download
Taiwan	June 22, 2011	Digital download
