= Alexis Jordan =

American Singer

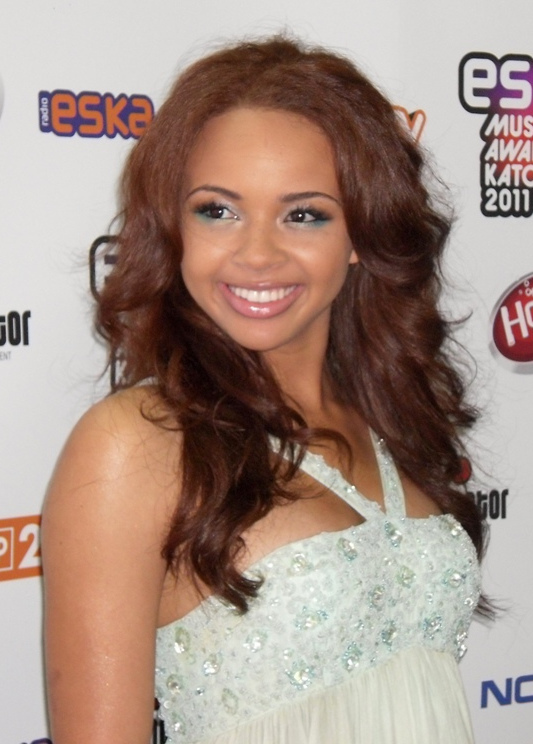
- Jordan at the ESKA Music Awards in May 2011

Background information
- Born: April 7, 1992 (age 34); Columbia, South Carolina, U.S.
- Genres: R&B; pop; dance-pop
- Occupations: Singer; Songwriter; Actress
- Works: Alexis Jordan discography
- Years active: 2003–2014
- Labels: StarRoc; Roc Nation; Sony Music; Columbia
- Spouse: Luke Broadlick (m. 2014)
- Website: www.alexisjordanofficial.com

Alexis Jordan (born April 7, 1992) is an American former singer and actress from Columbia, South Carolina. Jordan rose to fame as a contestant on the first season of America's Got Talent in 2006 at the age of 14. After being eliminated from the show, she began to upload cover songs to YouTube, which received millions of views. The exposure led Jordan to the attention of Norwegian production team Stargate and American rapper Jay-Z, who both went on to sign her to their joint label, StarRoc.

Jordan's debut single, "Happiness", was released in September 2010, and reached number one in the Netherlands, Norway and on the US Billboard Hot Dance Club Songs, and also became a top-three hit in Australia and the United Kingdom. "Good Girl" was released as Jordan's second single in February 2011, and reached No. 1 on the US Hot Dance Club Songs, No. 3 in Scotland and No. 6 in UK. Jordan's debut self-titled album was released on February 25, 2011. It debuted in the UK and Scotland at No. 9 and on the Australian Albums Chart at No. 11. Jordan also featured on Sean Paul's single "Got 2 Luv U", which reached number one in Switzerland and Romania.

== Life and career ==
=== 1992–2008: Early life and career beginnings ===
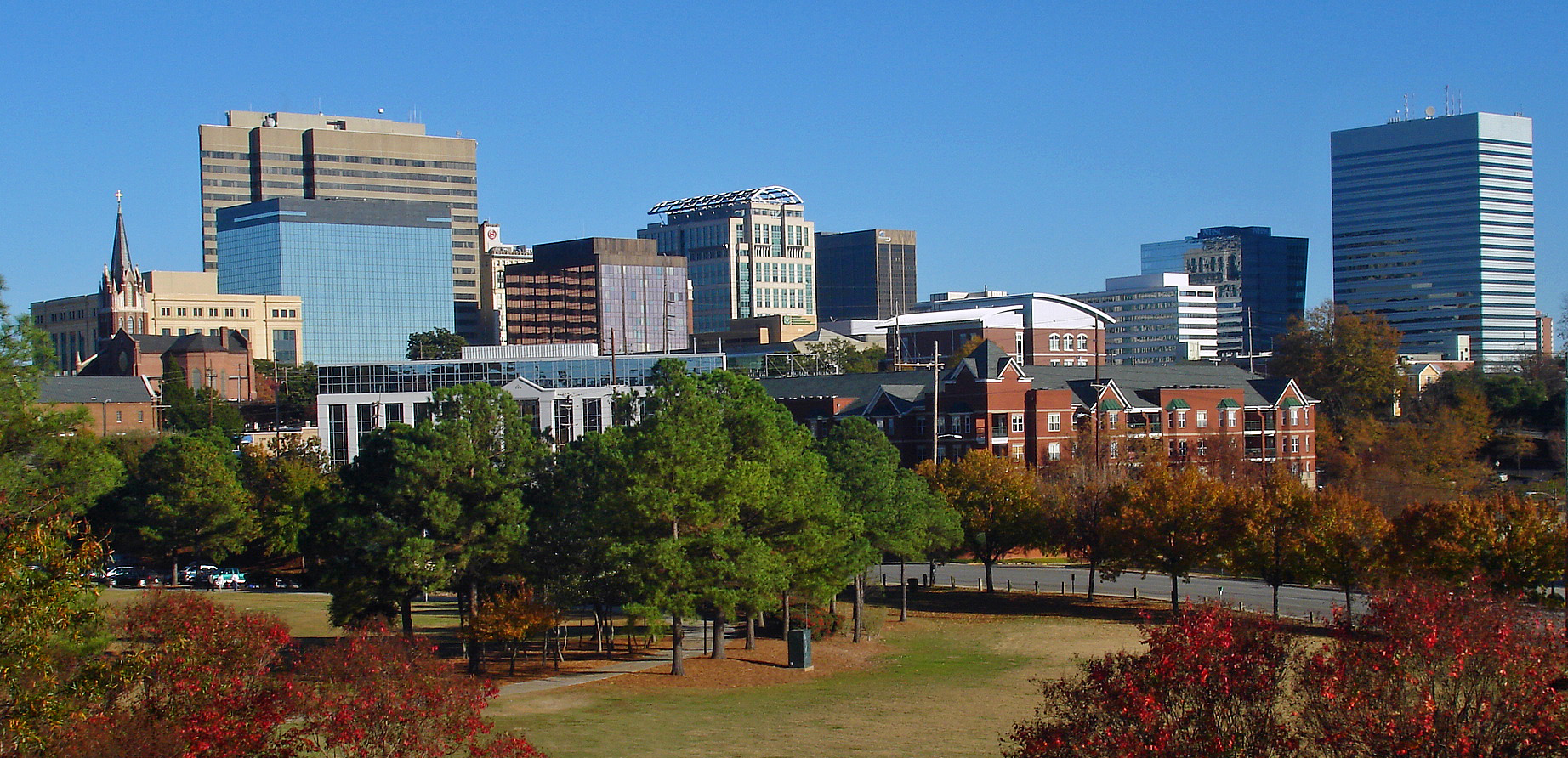
Jordan was born in Columbia, South Carolina.

Alexis Jordan was born on April 7, 1992, in Columbia, South Carolina, to a mother of African American, Native American and European descent and a Puerto Rican father. Jordan began writing songs while she was in third grade. At the age of 11, she moved with her parents and three younger siblings Taylor, Malichai and Malcolm to Santa Clarita, California, to pursue a career in the arts. At the age of 12, Jordan served as an opening act for Smokey Robinson at a Stevie Wonder tribute concert.

In 2006, Jordan auditioned for the first season of America's Got Talent. She sang Whitney Houston's "I Have Nothing" at her audition and made it through to the next round, only to be eliminated in the semifinals. Judge Brandy brought her back to compete in the semifinals, after the public didn't gather enough votes for Jordan. After being eliminated from the show, Jordan and her family moved to Atlanta to be closer to the music industry. While there, she began to upload cover songs on YouTube while submitting demos. By 2008, Jordan's YouTube page was racking up millions of views. The exposure led Jordan to the attention of production team Stargate who called her to fly to New York and record a few songs with them. While in the studio, rapper Jay-Z walked in, which ultimately resulted in Jordan becoming the first artist signed to the new, Sony Music-affiliated label, StarRoc/Roc Nation – a joint venture between Stargate and Jay-Z's Roc Nation label.

=== 2010–2012: Record deal and Alexis Jordan ===
Her self-titled debut album was released on February 25, 2011. The album was recorded from January 1, 2007, to October 15, 2010, in which Jordan worked with StarGate, Sandy Vee, Nightwatch and Espionage. The album debuted at number twenty-eight in Ireland on March 4, 2011. In the United Kingdom, the album debuted at number nine on March 6, 2011. The album also debuted at number eleven in Australia. On April 30, 2011, the album debuted at number 80 on the Dutch Album Chart. In its 13th week the album shot from 72 to 23, reaching its peak of 21 two weeks later. Jordan's single "Happiness" (which samples the Deadmau5 track "Brazil (2nd Edit)") was released in September 2010. In the United States, the song reached No. 1 on the Hot Dance Club Songs, becoming Jordan's first No. 1 single on that chart. It also reached No. 1 in Norway and the Netherlands (where it stayed for 10 weeks), and peaked at No. 3 in Australia and the United Kingdom. In Australia, "Happiness" was certified triple platinum by the Australian Recording Industry Association (ARIA), for shipments of 210,000 copies. "Good Girl" was released as Jordan's second single in February 2011. The song debuted at No. 6 on the UK Singles Chart, giving Jordan her second top-10 hit in the United Kingdom. It also reached No. 15 in Ireland and became her second chart-topper on the Billboard Hot Dance Club Songs chart in April. "Hush Hush" was released as the album's third single on May 8, 2011.

On April 12, 2012, Alexis embarked on her first headline tour in the United Kingdom. Jordan performed in three cities – London (Scala) on Thursday June 30, Birmingham HMV (Institute) on Saturday July 2 and Manchester (Club Academy) on Sunday July 3. Tickets went on sale on Friday April 15. In June and July 2011 Jordan also supported British boy band JLS on their eight-day UK tour. She also appeared at T4 on the Beach in the UK and performed "Hush Hush" and "Good Girl". Jordan featured on Sean Paul's single "Got 2 Luv U", which reached number one in Switzerland, Netherlands, Norway, Bulgaria, Romania, France, United States Billboard (in the Latin Raps & Pop Songs) and Venezuela. Jordan also made a cameo appearance in the film Honey 2. In June 2012, Jordan appeared at Birmingham Pride, performing "Good Girl", "Got 2 Luv U", "Shout Shout" and "Hush Hush" On November 25, 2012, she appeared as musical guest on X Factor (Romania).

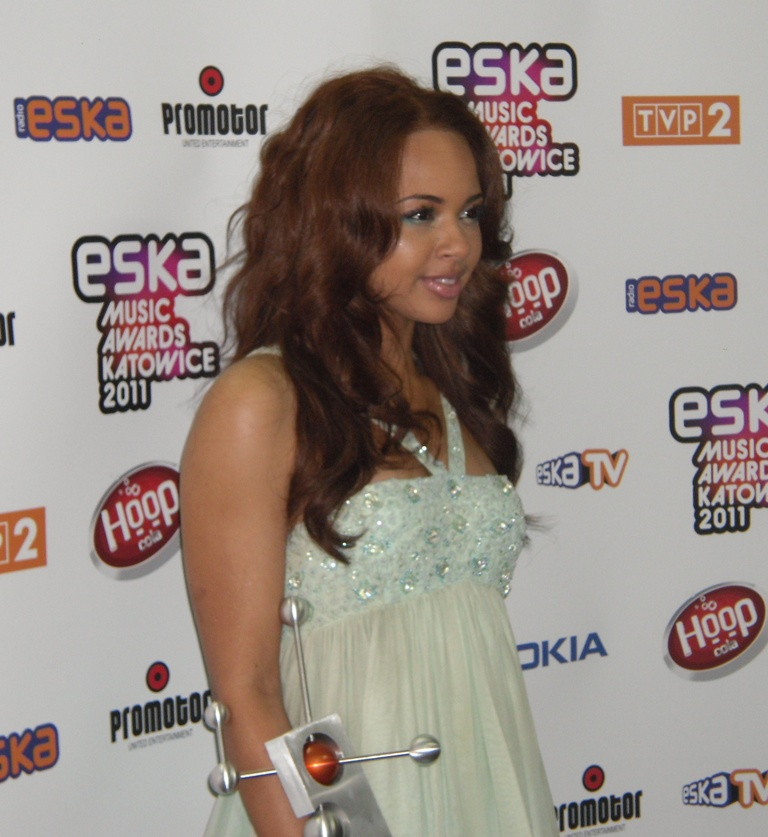
Jordan in May 2011

=== 2011–2014: Second studio album ===
In October 2011, she confirmed via Twitter that she was working on her second studio album. In November 2011, Jordan went to a recording studio in New York where she recorded with Stargate, she stated that the album is nearly completed. In the same YouTube video uploaded by Jordan, she was asked what she was doing and she replied "Writing about different things 'cause I'm like all messed up cause I'm talking about girl power, then I'm talking about myself and how people don't really know me that well so they gonna get to know me in this song."

On January 15, 2013, a new song titled "Acid Rain" leaked online. It was intended to serve as the lead cut from her second album. "Acid Rain" samples Bingo Players' song "Rattle," and is written by Sia and produced by Stargate. An alternate version of the song excluding Cole was released for digital download on February 20, 2013.

== Personal life ==
In 2014, Jordan married Luke Broadlick, an actor. In 2016, she gave birth to their daughter, Anora. In 2017, she gave birth to their first son, Cain. In 2019, she gave birth to their second son, Abel.

== Artistry ==
=== Music and influences ===
Jordan's self-titled debut album contained dance-pop, pop and R&B music, in an interview Jordan described the album's musical style saying "I don't want to be kept in a box. I'm that pop artist, but I can switch it up and turn to R&B/soul and do lots of ballads and the hip-hop swag. It's very versatile". Alexis described her album's genre as being "universal" saying in an interview "It's going to be very universal. It's not just a pop dance record. It has a little reggae, a little hip-hop swag, so it's going to be everything."

Jordan cites singers Christina Aguilera, Whitney Houston, Mariah Carey and Beyoncé as influences. Jordan also cites Michael Jackson as an influence, calling him "a big inspiration".

== Discography ==
Studio albums

- Alexis Jordan (2011)

== Filmography ==
=== Film ===
Year	Film	Character	Description
2011	Honey 2	Herself	Cameo appearance
2011	Justice	Lauren	Short film

=== Television ===
Year	Film	Role	Notes
2006	America's Got Talent	Herself – Contestant	Eliminated in the semi-finals
2008	Emily's Reasons Why Not	Sister	Episode: "Why Not to Date a Twin"
2010	The Xtra Factor	Herself	1 episode
2011	Adam Hills In Gordon Street Tonight	Herself	1 episode
2011	The Dome	Herself	Episode: "The Dome 57"
2011	T4 on the Beach	Herself – Performer	

== Awards and nominations ==
Year	Organisation	Award	Result	Ref(s)
2011	ESKA Music Awards	International Hit of the Year ("Happiness")	Won	
2011	MOBO Awards	Best International Act	Nominated	
2011	MTV Europe Music Awards	Best Push Act	Nominated	

== See also ==
- List of YouTubers
