= Ne-Yo discography =

R&B recording artist discography

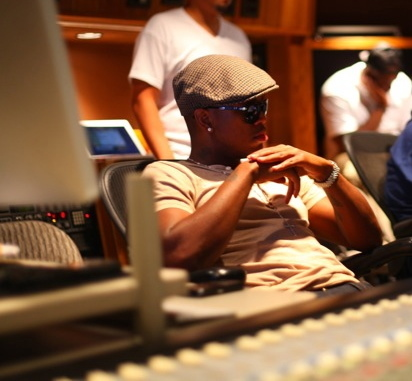
- Ne-Yo in a recording studio in 2011
- Studio albums: 10
- Compilation albums: 3
- Singles: 41
- Music videos: 31
- Other appearances: 13

The discography of American singer Ne-Yo consists of ten studio albums, forty-one singles, several guest appearances with other artists, as well as production and songwriting for other artists.

In 2006, Ne-Yo's debut album, In My Own Words, debuted at number one on the Billboard 200 in the United States. His second single, "So Sick", reached number one on the Billboard Hot 100; it was also Ne-Yo's first UK number-one single. The album was certified platinum by the Recording Industry Association of America in the US and gold by the British Phonographic Industry in the UK. Ne-Yo's second album, Because of You, was released in May 2007; it debuted at number one in the US and number six in the UK. The first single, "Because of You", peaked at number two in the US and number four in the UK. The album was certified platinum in the US and silver in the UK.

Ne-Yo's third album, Year of the Gentleman, was released in September 2008 and debuted at number two in both the US and the UK. The first single, "Closer", became Ne-Yo's second UK number-one single and peaked at number seven in the US. Year of the Gentleman was certified platinum in the US. In September 2009, Ne-Yo released his first greatest hits album, Ne-Yo: The Collection, in Japan.

== Albums ==
=== Studio albums ===
List of studio albums, with selected chart positions, sales figures and certifications
Title	Album details	Peak chart positions										Sales	Certifications
Title	Album details	US	US R&B/HH	AUS	CAN	GER	IRL	NLD	NZ	SWI	UK	Sales	Certifications
In My Own Words	Released: February 28, 2006 (US); Label: Compound, Def Jam; Formats: Digital download, CD, vinyl	1	1	41	9	27	81	50	35	11	14	US: 1,400,000	RIAA: 2× Platinum; BPI: Platinum; RMNZ: Platinum
Because of You	Released: May 1, 2007 (US); Label: Compound, Def Jam; Formats: Digital download, CD, vinyl	1	1	39	8	54	34	30	34	49	6		RIAA: Platinum; BPI: Gold; RMNZ: Platinum
Year of the Gentleman	Released: September 16, 2008 (US); Label: Compound, Def Jam; Formats: Digital download, CD, vinyl	2	1	7	4	22	13	26	6	9	2		RIAA: Platinum; BPI: 2× Platinum; MC: Gold; RMNZ: 2× Platinum
Libra Scale	Released: November 22, 2010 (US); Label: Compound, Def Jam; Formats: Digital download, CD, vinyl	9	4	36	57	53	24	48	—	15	11	US: 345,000	BPI: Silver
R.E.D.	Released: November 6, 2012 (US); Label: Compound, Motown; Formats: Digital download, CD, vinyl	4	1	37	24	83	26	34	—	40	17	US: 264,000	BPI: Silver
Non-Fiction	Released: January 27, 2015 (US); Label: Compound, Motown; Formats: Digital download, CD, vinyl	5	1	25	—	75	78	44	29	59	16	US: 108,601	
Good Man	Released: June 8, 2018 (US); Label: Compound, Motown; Formats: Digital download, CD, vinyl	33	17	—	—	—	—	—	—	—	—		
Another Kind of Christmas	Released: October 11, 2019; Label: Compound, Motown; Formats: Digital download, CD, vinyl	—	—	—	—	—	—	—	—	—	—		
Self-Explanatory	Released: July 15, 2022; Label: Compound, Motown; Formats: Digital download, CD	184	—	—	—	—	—	—	—	—	—		
Highway 79	Released: July 10, 2026; Label: HSG Ventures, 10K Projects; Formats: Digital download, CD, vinyl	—	—	—	—	—	—	—	—	—	—		
"—" denotes a recording that did not chart or was not released in that territory.

=== Compilation albums ===
List of compilation albums, with selected chart positions and certifications
Title	Album details	Peak chart positions	Certifications
Title	Album details	JPN	Certifications
Ne-Yo: The Collection	Released: September 2, 2009 (JPN); Label: Def Jam; Formats: CD, DVD, digital download	4	RIAJ: Gold
Ne-Yo 20 - All Time Best	Released: September 17, 2025 (JPN); Label: Universal Music; Formats: CD	—	
That Sexy Love: 20 Years of Love Songs	Released: February 27, 2026; Label: Universal Music; Formats: Digital download, streaming	—	

== Singles ==
=== As lead artist ===
List of singles as lead artist, with selected chart positions and certifications, showing year released and album name
Title	Year	Peak chart positions										Certifications	Album
Title	Year	US	US R&B/HH	AUS	CAN	GER	IRL	NLD	NZ	SWI	UK	Certifications	Album
"Stay" (featuring Peedi Peedi)	2005	—	36	—	—	—	—	—	—	—	—		In My Own Words
"So Sick"	2005	1	3	4	4	11	2	11	2	5	1	RIAA: Gold; RIAA: Platinum (Mastertone); ARIA: Gold; BPI: 2× Platinum; BVMI: Gold; RIAJ: 2× Platinum; RMNZ: 4× Platinum	In My Own Words
"When You're Mad"	2006	15	4	81	—	—	—	—	—	—	—	RMNZ: Gold	In My Own Words
"Sexy Love"	2006	7	2	14	—	28	7	42	8	29	5	RIAA: Gold; RIAA: Platinum (Mastertone); BPI: Gold; RMNZ: Platinum	In My Own Words
"Because of You"	2007	2	7	23	19	30	9	12	1	51	4	RIAA: 2× Platinum; BPI: Platinum; RMNZ: 3× Platinum	Because of You
"Do You"	2007	26	3	—	—	—	—	—	—	—	100		Because of You
"Can We Chill"	2007	—	52	—	—	—	—	—	—	—	62		Because of You
"Go on Girl"	2007	96	27	—	—	—	—	—	—	—	27	RMNZ: Gold	Because of You
"Closer"	2008	7	21	8	19	4	3	10	3	17	1	RIAA: Platinum; ARIA: Platinum; BPI: 2× Platinum; BVMI: Gold; MC: Platinum; RMNZ: 2× Platinum	Year of the Gentleman
"Miss Independent"	2008	7	1	40	21	30	9	6	4	67	6	RIAA: Platinum; BPI: 2× Platinum; RMNZ: 4× Platinum	Year of the Gentleman
"Single" (with New Kids on the Block)	2008	— (Note: "Single" did not enter the Billboard Hot 100, but peaked at number 7 on the Bubbling Under Hot 100 chart, which acts as an extension to the Hot 100.)	—	116	42	—	—	—	—	—	81		The Block
"She Got Her Own" (featuring Jamie Foxx and Fabolous)	2008	54	2	—	—	—	—	—	—	—	—		Year of the Gentleman
"Mad"	2008	11	5	82	23	—	30	30	5	—	19	RIAA: Platinum; BPI: Gold; RMNZ: 2× Platinum	Year of the Gentleman
"Part of the List"	2009	—	70	—	—	—	—	—	—	—	—		Year of the Gentleman
"Nobody" (Note: "Nobody" was only released as a single in Italy.)	2009	—	—	—	—	—	—	—	—	—	—		Year of the Gentleman
"Never Knew I Needed" (with Cassandra Steen)	2009	—	56	—	—	64	—	—	—	—	99		The Princess and the Frog
"Beautiful Monster"	2010	53	61	53	40	13	9	28	20	15	1	BPI: Gold	Libra Scale
"Champagne Life"	2010	75	11	—	—	—	—	—	—	—	—		Libra Scale
"One in a Million"	2010	87	17	78	—	—	—	—	—	52	20	RIAA: Gold; BPI: Silver; RMNZ: Platinum	Libra Scale
"Think Like a Man" (with Jennifer Hudson featuring Rick Ross)	2012	90	33	—	—	—	—	—	—	—	—		Think like a Man
"Lazy Love"	2012	— (Note: "Lazy Love" did not enter the Billboard Hot 100, but peaked at number 14 on the Bubbling Under Hot 100 chart, which acts as an extension to the Hot 100.)	25	—	—	—	—	—	—	—	—		R.E.D.
"Let Me Love You (Until You Learn to Love Yourself)"	2012	6	—	8	11	61	5	20	20	55	1	RIAA: Platinum; ARIA: 2× Platinum; BPI: Platinum; RMNZ: Platinum	R.E.D.
"Don't Make Em Like You" (featuring Wiz Khalifa)	2012	—	47	—	—	—	—	—	—	—	—		R.E.D.
"Forever Now"	2012	— (Note: "Forever Now" did not enter the Billboard Hot 100, but peaked at number seven on the Bubbling Under Hot 100 chart, which acts as an extension to the Hot 100.)	—	51	—	64	—	—	—	—	31		R.E.D.
"Should Be You"	2013	—	24^{1}	—	—	—	—	—	—	—	—		R.E.D.
"Incredible" (with Celine Dion)	2013	—	—	—	44	—	—	—	—	—	—		Loved Me Back to Life
"Money Can't Buy" (featuring Jeezy)	2014	—	41	—	—	—	—	—	—	—	—		Non-Fiction
"She Knows" (featuring Juicy J)	2014	19	6	—	85	—	—	—	—	—	28	RIAA: Platinum; BPI: Gold; RMNZ: Platinum	Non-Fiction
"Time of Our Lives" (with Pitbull)	2014	9	—	12	10	22	36	15	12	35	27	RIAA: 8× Platinum; ARIA: Platinum; BPI: 2× Platinum; BVMI: Gold; RMNZ: 7× Platinum	Non-Fiction
"Coming with You"	2015	—	21^{1}	—	—	—	—	—	—	—	14		Non-Fiction
"Another Love Song"	2017	—	23^{1}	—	—	—	—	—	—	—	—		Non-album single
"Good Man"	2018	—	15^{1}	—	—	—	—	—	—	—	—		Good Man
"Push Back" (with Bebe Rexha and Stefflon Don)	2018	—	—	—	—	—	—	—	—	—	—		Good Man
"Pinky Ring" (featuring O.T. Genasis)	2020	—	—	—	—	—	—	—	—	—	—		Non-album single
"U 2 Luv" (featuring Jeremih)	2020	66	20	—	—	—	—	—	—	—	—	RMNZ: Gold	Self Explanatory
"Raider Colors" (with Ice Cube and Too $hort featuring DJ Nina 9 and Rayven Justice)	2021	—	—	—	—	—	—	—	—	—	—		Non-album single
"What If"	2021	—	—	—	—	—	—	—	—	—	—		Self Explanatory
"Stay Down" (featuring Yung Bleu)	2021	—	—	—	—	—	—	—	—	—	—		Self Explanatory
"Don't Love Me"	2022	—	—	—	—	—	—	—	—	—	—		Self Explanatory
"You Got the Body"	2022	—	—	—	—	—	—	—	—	—	—		Self Explanatory
"Handle Me Gently"	2022	—	—	—	—	—	—	—	—	—	—		Self Explanatory
"Link Up" (solo or remix featuring Fabolous)	2023	—	—	—	—	—	—	—	—	—	—		Non-album singles
"2 Million Secrets"	2024	—	—	—	—	—	—	—	—	—	—		Non-album singles
"Show Me"	2024	—	—	—	—	—	—	—	—	—	—		Non-album singles
"Simple Things"	2025	—	—	—	—	—	—	—	—	—	—		Highway 79
"Up Out & Gone"	2026	—	—	—	—	—	—	—	—	—	—		Highway 79
"Ms. Tundra"	2026	—	—	—	—	—	—	—	—	—	—		Highway 79
"Thinking What I'm Thinking"	2026	—	—	—	—	—	—	—	—	—	—		Highway 79
"Dance Right Now"	2026	—	—	—	—	—	—	—	—	—	—		Highway 79
"—" denotes a recording that did not chart or was not released in that territory.^{1} denotes a peak on the Hot R&B Songs chart.

=== As featured artist ===
List of singles as featured artist, with selected chart positions and certifications, showing year released and album name
Title	Year	Peak chart positions										Certifications	Album
Title	Year	US	US R&B/HH	AUS	CAN	GER	IRL	NLD	NZ	SWI	UK	Certifications	Album
"Feels So Good" (Remy Ma featuring Ne-Yo)	2006	101 (Note: "Feels So Good" did not enter the Billboard Hot 100, but peaked at number one on the Bubbling Under Hot 100 chart, which acts as an extension to the Hot 100.)	20	—	—	—	—	—	—	—	—		There's Something About Remy: Based on a True Story
"Back Like That" (Ghostface Killah featuring Ne-Yo)	2006	61	14	—	—	—	48	—	—	—	46		Fishscale
"Put It in a Letter" (Mic Little featuring Ne-Yo)	2006	—	91	—	—	—	—	—	—	—	—		Put It in a Letter
"Make Me Better" (Fabolous featuring Ne-Yo)	2007	8	2	—	79	—	—	—	—	—	—	RIAA: Platinum	From Nothin' to Somethin'
"Sexual Healing" (Sarah Connor featuring Ne-Yo)	2007	—	—	—	—	11	—	—	—	41	—		Soulicious
"Hate That I Love You" (Rihanna featuring Ne-Yo)	2007	7	20	14	17	11	13	22	6	13	15	RIAA: 2× Platinum; ARIA: 4× Platinum; BPI: Platinum; BVMI: Gold; RMNZ: 2× Platinum	Good Girl Gone Bad
"Bust It Baby (Part 2)" (Plies featuring Ne-Yo)	2008	7	2	—	—	—	—	—	9	—	81	RIAA: Platinum; RMNZ: Platinum	Definition of Real
"Finer Things" (DJ Felli Fel featuring Kanye West, Jermaine Dupri, Fabolous and Ne-Yo)	2008	— (Note: "Finer Things" did not enter the Billboard Hot 100, but peaked at number one on the Bubbling Under Hot 100 chart, which acts as an extension to the Hot 100.)	80	—	—	—	—	—	—	—	—		Non-album single
"By My Side" (Jadakiss featuring Ne-Yo)	2008	—	53	—	—	—	—	—	—	—	—		The Last Kiss
"Camera Phone" (The Game featuring Ne-Yo)	2008	—	—	—	—	—	—	—	—	—	48		LAX
"Knock You Down" (Keri Hilson featuring Kanye West and Ne-Yo)	2009	3	1	24	9	30	2	24	1	—	5	RIAA: 2× Platinum; ARIA: Gold; BPI: Platinum; RMNZ: 4× Platinum	In a Perfect World...
"Be on You" (Flo Rida featuring Ne-Yo)	2009	19	—	—	61	—	—	—	—	—	51		R.O.O.T.S.
"Sunshine" (Phyllisia featuring Ne-Yo and Flo Rida)	2009	—	62	—	—	—	—	—	—	—	—		Non-album single
"What You Do" (Chrisette Michele featuring Ne-Yo)	2009	—	57	—	—	—	—	—	—	—	—		Epiphany
"Baby by Me" (50 Cent featuring Ne-Yo)	2009	28	7	24	53	26	27	—	—	43	17	BPI: Gold; RMNZ: 2× Platinum	Before I Self Destruct
"Angels Cry" (Mariah Carey featuring Ne-Yo)	2010	—	90	—	—	—	—	—	—	—	81		Memoirs of an Imperfect Angel
"Super High" (Rick Ross featuring Ne-Yo)	2010	100	19	—	—	—	—	—	—	—	—		Teflon Don
"Give Me Everything" (Pitbull featuring Ne-Yo, Afrojack and Nayer)	2011	1	79	2	1	2	1	1	2	2	1	RIAA: 11× Platinum; ARIA: 6× Platinum; BPI: 3× Platinum; BVMI: 3× Gold; IFPI SWI: 2× Platinum; MC: 4× Platinum; RMNZ: 5× Platinum	Planet Pit
"Legendary" (DJ Khaled featuring Chris Brown, Keyshia Cole and Ne-Yo)	2011	—	100	—	—	—	—	—	—	—	—		We the Best Forever
"No More" (LL Cool J featuring Ne-Yo)	2011	— (Note: "No More" did not enter the Billboard Hot 100, but peaked at number 24 on the Bubbling Under Hot 100 chart, which acts as an extension to the Hot 100.)	87	—	—	—	—	—	—	—	—		Non-album single
"Turn All the Lights On" (T-Pain featuring Ne-Yo)	2012	— (Note: "Turn All the Lights On" did not enter the Billboard Hot 100, but peaked at number 13 on the Bubbling Under Hot 100 chart, which acts as an extension to the Hot 100.)	—	14	45	44	—	—	7	—	—	ARIA: 2× Platinum; BVMI: Platinum; RMNZ: Platinum	Revolver
"Leave You Alone" (Young Jeezy featuring Ne-Yo)	2012	51	3	—	—	—	—	—	—	—	—	RIAA: Gold; RMNZ: Gold	Thug Motivation 103: Hustlerz Ambition
"Let's Go" (Calvin Harris featuring Ne-Yo)	2012	17	— (Note: "Let's Go" did not enter the Hot R&B/Hip-Hop Songs chart, but peaked at number 17 on the Bubbling Under R&B/Hip-Hop Songs chart, which acts as an extension to the R&B/Hip-Hop Songs chart.)	17	19	59	6	44	14	40	2	RIAA: Gold; ARIA: 2× Platinum; BPI: Platinum; MC: Platinum; RMNZ: Platinum	18 Months
"Hands in the Air" (Timbaland featuring Ne-Yo)	2012	— (Note: "Hands in the Air" did not enter the Billboard Hot 100, but peaked at number two on the Bubbling Under Hot 100 chart, which acts as an extension to the Hot 100.)	—	56	88	37	—	—	—	26	—		Step Up Revolution soundtrack
"Turn Around" (Conor Maynard featuring Ne-Yo)	2012	— (Note: "Turn Around" did not enter the Billboard Hot 100, but peaked at number 10 on the Bubbling Under Hot 100 chart, which acts as an extension to the Hot 100.)	—	43	—	76	14	20	28	—	8	ARIA: Gold; BPI: Silver; RMNZ: Gold	Contrast
"Play Hard" (David Guetta featuring Ne-Yo and Akon)	2013	64	—	16	34	8	8	37	11	3	6	ARIA: Platinum; BPI: 2× Platinum; RMNZ: Platinum	Nothing but the Beat 2.0
"Tonight" (Jessica Sanchez featuring Ne-Yo)	2013	—	—	42	—	—	—	—	—	—	—		Me, You and the Music
"Higher Place" (Dimitri Vegas & Like Mike featuring Ne-Yo)	2015	—	—	—	—	—	—	—	—	— (Note: "Higher Place" did not enter the NZ Top 40 Singles Chart, but peaked at number 1 on the NZ Heatseekers chart.)	—	RMNZ: Gold	Non-album single
"Marry You" (Diamond Platnumz featuring Ne-Yo)	2017	—	—	—	—	—	—	—	—	—	—		A Boy from Tandale
"Unlove You" (Armin van Buuren featuring Ne-Yo)	2019	—	—	—	—	—	—	—	—	—	—		Balance
"Me Quedaré Contigo" (with Pitbull featuring Lenier and El Micha)	2019	—	—	—	—	—	—	—	—	—	74	RIAA: 2× Platinum (Latin)	Libertad 548
"Over Again" (Charly Black featuring Ne-Yo)	2020	—	—	—	—	—	—	—	—	—	—		Non-album singles
"Shake" (with L.L.A.M.A. and Carmen DeLeon)	2021	—	—	—	—	—	—	—	—	—	—		Non-album singles
"No Plans For Love" (D-Nice featuring Ne-Yo and Kent Jones)	2021	—	41	—	—	—	—	—	—	—	—		Non-album singles
"Let Me Go" (Benny Benassi featuring Ne-Yo)	2021	—	—	—	—	—	—	—	—	—	—		Non-album singles
"Kiss Me It's Christmas" (with Leona Lewis)	2021	—	—	—	—	—	—	—	—	—	87		Christmas, With Love Always
"Through The Fire" (Yung Bleu featuring Ne-Yo)	2022	—	—	—	—	—	—	—	—	—	—		Tantra
"Real Man" (Behani featuring Ne-Yo)	2022	—	—	—	44	—	—	—	—	—	—		Non-album single
"Mexico" (Dimitri Vegas & Like Mike featuring Ne-Yo and Danna Paola)	2022	—	—	—	—	—	—	—	—	—	—		TBA
"2 the Moon" (Pitbull featuring Ne-Yo and Afrojack)	2024	—	—	—	—	—	—	—	—	—	—		TBA
"—" denotes a recording that did not chart or was not released in that territory.

=== Promotional singles ===
List of promotional singles, with selected chart positions, showing year released and album name
Title	Year	Peak chart positions		Album
Title	Year	US	UK	Album
"The Way You Move" (featuring Trey Songz and T-Pain)	2011	— (Note: "The Way You Move" did not enter the Billboard Hot 100, but peaked at number 10 on the Bubbling Under Hot 100 chart, which acts as an extension to the Hot 100.)	—	Non-album single
"Who's Taking You Home"	2014	—	—	Non-Fiction
"Religious"	2014	—	—	Non-Fiction
"One More" (featuring T.I.)	2015	—	195	Non-Fiction
"Apology"	2018	—	—	Good Man
"—" denotes a recording that did not chart or was not released in that territory.

== Other charted songs ==
List of other charted songs, with selected chart positions, showing year released and album name
Title	Year	Peak chart positions		Album
Title	Year	US R&B/HH	UK	Album
"Leaving Tonight" (featuring Jennifer Hudson)	2007	55	—	Because of You
"Good Night Good Morning" (with Alexandra Burke)	2009	—	129	Overcome
"Telekinesis"	2011	— (Note: "Telekinesis" did not enter the Hot R&B/Hip-Hop Songs chart, but peaked at number three on the Bubbling Under R&B/Hip-Hop Singles chart, which acts as an extension to the R&B/Hip-Hop Songs chart.)	—	Libra Scale
"Crazy Love" (featuring Fabolous)	2011	72	—	Libra Scale
"Miss Right"	2012	— (Note: "Miss Right" did not enter the Hot R&B/Hip-Hop Songs chart, but peaked at number three on the Bubbling Under R&B/Hip-Hop Singles chart, which acts as an extension to the R&B/Hip-Hop Songs chart.)	—	R.E.D.
"Should Be You"^{[N]} (featuring Fabolous and Diddy)	2012	— (Note: "Should Be You" did not enter the Hot R&B/Hip-Hop Songs chart, but peaked at number nine on the Bubbling Under R&B/Hip-Hop Singles chart, which acts as an extension to the R&B/Hip-Hop Songs chart.)	—	R.E.D.
"—" denotes a recording that did not chart or was not released in that territory.

== Guest appearances ==
List of non-single guest appearances, with other performing artists, showing year released and album name
Title	Year	Other performer(s)	Album
"Minority Report"	2006	Jay-Z	Kingdom Come
"My Drink n My 2 Step" (Remix)	2007	Cassidy, Kanye West, Swizz Beatz	none
"Hot Thing" (Remix)	2007	Talib Kweli, Jean Grae	none
"Gentleman's Affair"	2008	The Game	LAX
"Good Night Good Morning"	2009	Alexandra Burke	Overcome
"Makin' Love"	2009	Fabolous	Loso's Way
"You Don't Know Me Girl"	2009	Mister D, Kryptonite	Year Of The Gangster
"Choose"	2009	David Guetta, Kelly Rowland	One Love
"Bossy Lady"	2009	Rick Ross	Deeper Than Rap
"The Life"	2009	Willy Northpole	Tha Connect
"Good Night Good Morning"	2009	Brandy	none
"Other Side"	2010	Shanell, Lil Wayne	Shut Up and Listen
"Tell Me a Secret"	2010	Ludacris	Battle of the Sexes
"U Get on My Nerves"	2010	Jazmine Sullivan	Love Me Back
"Do What You Do"	2010	Madcon	Contraband
"It's OK"	2010	Maino	none
"Don't Say You Don't Love Me"	2010	Mister D, MC Magic	Midnight Love & Oldies, Vol. 1
"She Crazy"	2010	Rick Ross, Aaliyah	Ashes to Ashes
"Look at Her (You Be Killin' Em Part 2)"	2011	Fabolous, Ryan Leslie	The S.O.U.L. Tape
"Legendary"	2011	DJ Khaled, Chris Brown, Keyshia Cole	We the Best Forever
"White Linen (Coolin')"	2011	Wale	Ambition
"Only Human"	2012	Tim McGraw	Emotional Traffic
"Maybach Music IV"	2012	Rick Ross	God Forgives, I Don't
"Get It In"	2013	Funkmaster Flex, Swizz Beatz	Who You Mad At? Me Or Yourself?
"We Go Where Ever We Want"	2013	French Montana, Raekwon	Excuse My French
"Tired of Dreaming"	2013	Wale, Rick Ross	The Gifted
"Twerk It" (Remix)	2013	Busta Rhymes, Vybz Kartel, T.I., Jeremih, French Montana	none
"Respect That You Earn"	2013	Yo Gotti, Wale	I Am
"Could Be Me"	2014	MKTO	MKTO
"Ain't Nothin New"	2015	Jadakiss, Nipsey Hussle	Top 5 Dead or Alive
"Sin Miedo"	2016	Yunel, J Alvarez	none
"That Comeback"	2017	T-Pain	Oblivion
"Top Priority"	2017	Blackbear	Cybersex
"Ain't Like You"	2017	Problem, Terrace Martin	Selfish
"Dirty Dancin'"	2018	Eric Bellinger	Eazy Call
"Get Together"	2019	Gang Starr, Nitty Scott	One of the Best Yet
"Angels and Harmony"	2019	Jane Zhang	Past Progressive
"No Plans For Love" (Remix)	2021	D-Nice, Kent Jones, Snoop Dogg	none
"Love Songs"	2022	Fivio Foreign	B.I.B.L.E.
"Don't Fall out of Love"	2023	Jhonni Blaze	Don't Fall out of Love
"Heavenly Hell"	2024	Steve Aoki	Paragon

== Production discography ==
List of production and songwriting credits (excluding guest appearances, interpolations, and samples)
Track(s)	Year	Credit	Artist(s)	Album
1. "Pedal to the Steel"	1999	Songwriter	Youngstown	Let's Roll
8. "Lose My Cool"	1999	Songwriter	Youngstown	Let's Roll
11. "Don't Worry (Dance Floor)"	1999	Songwriter	Youngstown	Let's Roll
5. "Our Life"	2001	Songwriter	Outlawz	Novakane
14. "World Wide (Remix)"	2001	Songwriter	Outlawz	Novakane
1. "Machine"	2001	Songwriter	Youngstown	Down for the Get Down
2. "Float Away"	2001	Songwriter	Youngstown	Down for the Get Down
7. "Down for the Get Down"	2001	Songwriter	Youngstown	Down for the Get Down
8. "So Tight"	2001	Songwriter	Youngstown	Down for the Get Down
9. "Away with the Summer Days"	2001	Songwriter	Youngstown	Down for the Get Down
10. "Dance Floor (Part 2)"	2001	Songwriter	Youngstown	Down for the Get Down
4. "La Di Dah"	2001	Uncredited performer, songwriter	Destiny's Child	Superlow Mix
1. "Still In Love"	2002	Songwriter	Nivea	Nivea
4. "That Girl"	2003	Songwriter	Marques Houston	MH
2. "Dip It Low"; (featuring Fabolous)	2004	Arranger	Christina Milian	It's About Time
6. "Baby"; (featuring Mike Shorey)	2004	Songwriter	Fabolous	Real Talk
4. "Let Me Love You"	2004	Songwriter	Mario	Turning Point
1. "Be Your Girl"	2005	Songwriter	Teedra Moses	Complex Simplicity
8. "Kick It With You"; (featuring Mario)	2005	Songwriter	Cassidy	I'm a Hustla
"Getcha Hands Up"	2005	Songwriter	Miguel	—N/a
8. "Miss My Everything"	2005	Songwriter	Lee Ryan	Lee Ryan
12. "In the Morning"	2005	Songwriter	Lee Ryan	Lee Ryan
15. "So Glad"	2005	Songwriter, background vocals	Chris Brown	Chris Brown (European version)
6. "Preserve the Sexy"; (featuring Teairra Mari)	2006	Songwriter	LL Cool J	Todd Smith
1. "Gallery"	2006	Songwriter	Mario Vazquez	Mario Vazquez
3. "Unfaithful"	2006	Songwriter	Rihanna	A Girl Like Me
10. "Y'all Ain't Nothin'"	2006	Songwriter	Christina Milian	So Amazin'
4. "Didn't Mean To"	2006	Producer (with Curtis "Sauce" Wilson)	Heather Headley	In My Mind
10. "The Letter"	2006	Producer (with Curtis "Sauce" Wilson)	Heather Headley	In My Mind
3. "Make Ya Feel Beautiful"	2006	Songwriter	Ruben Studdard	The Return
8. "Rather Just Not Know"	2006	Songwriter	Ruben Studdard	The Return
4. "Dance for Me"	2006	Songwriter	Javier Colon	Left of Center
7. "Hurry Up"	2006	Songwriter	Frankie J	Priceless
2. "Walk Away (Remember Me)"; (featuring The D.E.Y.)	2006	Producer (with Stargate)	Paula DeAnda	Paula DeAnda
4. "When It Was Me"	2006	Songwriter	Paula DeAnda	Paula DeAnda
9. "Clap Ta this"; (featuring Ak'Sent)	2006	Songwriter	Paula DeAnda	Paula DeAnda
15. "Back Up Off Me"	2006	Songwriter	Paula DeAnda	Paula DeAnda
10. "Hollywood"; (featuring Beyoncé)	2006	Producer (with Syience)	Jay-Z	Kingdom Come
7. "Flaws and All"	2006	Producer (with Shea Taylor)	Beyoncé	B'Day
9. "Irreplaceable"	2006	Producer (with Stargate)	Beyoncé	B'Day
18. "If"	2006	Producer (with Stargate)	Beyoncé	B'Day
2. "Mrs. Philadelphia"	2007	Songwriter	Musiq Soulchild	Luvanmusiq
14. "What Is It Gonna Be"	2007	Songwriter	Mario	Go
6. "Wonderful"	2007	Songwriter	Marques Houston	Veteran
5. "I Get Lonely"	2007	Songwriter	Corbin Bleu	Another Side
6. "Hate That I Love You"; (featuring Ne-Yo)	2007	Vocal producer, songwriter	Rihanna	Good Girl Gone Bad: Reloaded
11. "Question Existing"	2007	Co-producer (with Shea Taylor)	Rihanna	Good Girl Gone Bad: Reloaded
12. "Good Girl Gone Bad"	2007	Co-producer (with Stargate)	Rihanna	Good Girl Gone Bad: Reloaded
14. "Take a Bow"	2007	Co-producer (with Stargate)	Rihanna	Good Girl Gone Bad: Reloaded
8. "Real Playa Like"; (featuring Lloyd)	2007	Songwriter	Fabolous	From Nothin' to Somethin'
10. "I'm You"	2007	Producer (with Eric Hudson)	Leona Lewis	Spirit
10. "Fade Away"	2007	Co-producer (with Stargate)	Mary J. Blige	Growing Pains
11. "What Love Is"	2007	Co-producer (with Stargate)	Mary J. Blige	Growing Pains
12. "Work In Progress (Growing Pains)"	2007	Co-producer (with Chuck Harmony)	Mary J. Blige	Growing Pains
15. "Smoke"	2007	Co-producer (with Syience)	Mary J. Blige	Growing Pains
7. "Rock with U"	2008	Songwriter	Janet Jackson	Discipline
9. "Can't B Good"	2008	Producer (with D. DoRohn Gough)	Janet Jackson	Discipline
20. "Discipline"	2008	Producer (with Shea Taylor)	Janet Jackson	Discipline
23. "Let Me Know"	2008	Producer (with Chuck Harmony)	Janet Jackson	Discipline
3. "Impossible"	2008	Co-producer (with Shea Taylor)	Tiffany Evans	Tiffany Evans
12. "His Mistakes"	2008	Producer (with Stargate)	Usher	Here I Stand
6. "Can You Handle It"	2008	Co-producer (with Syience)	Karina	First Love
8. "Happily Never After"	2008	Producer (with Shea Taylor)	The Pussycat Dolls	Doll Domination
"Bossy"	2008	Producer (with Stargate)	Lindsay Lohan	Non-album single
1. "Spotlight"	2008	Producer (with Stargate)	Jennifer Hudson	Jennifer Hudson
9. "Can't Stop The Rain"	2008	Producer (with Stargate)	Jennifer Hudson	Jennifer Hudson
10. "Take Me Away"	2008	Producer (with Syience)	John Legend	Evolver
14. "Floating Away"	2008	Producer (with Chuck Harmony)	John Legend	Evolver
1. "I Can Feel You"	2008	Co-producer (with Chuck Harmony)	Anastacia	Heavy Rotation
3. "Absolutely Positively"	2008	Co-producer (with Chuck Harmony)	Anastacia	Heavy Rotation
12. "I Got Nothin' Left"	2008	Co-producer (with Chuck Harmony	Celine Dion	Taking Chances
1. "Bang Bang"	2008	Co-producer (with Chuck Harmony and Curtis "Sauce" Wilson)	Brutha	Brutha
4. "Set It Off"	2008	Co-producer (with The Heavyweights)	Brutha	Brutha
9. "Just Being Honest"	2008	Songwriter	Brutha	Brutha
8. "I'm In Love"	2009	Co-producer (with Stargate)	Lionel Richie	Just Go
4. "Don't Go"	2009	Producer (with Chuck Harmony)	J. Holiday	Round 2
11. "Nothing But the Girl"	2009	Co-producer (with Stargate)	Alexandra Burke	Overcome
14. "It's Over"	2009	Co-producer (with Stargate)	Alexandra Burke	Overcome
6. "Epiphany"	2009	Producer (with Chuck Harmony)	Chrisette Michele	Epiphany
8. On My Own"	2009	Songwriter	Chrisette Michele	Epiphany
11. "Porcelain Doll"	2009	Songwriter	Chrisette Michele	Epiphany
12. "I'm Okay"	2009	Songwriter	Chrisette Michele	Epiphany
3. "Not Anymore"	2009	Producer (with Bei Maejor)	Letoya Luckett	Lady Love
6. "The Best"	2009	Songwriter	Michael Bolton	One World One Love
4. "Stupid in Love"	2009	Producer (with Stargate)	Rihanna	Rated R
6. "Russian Roulette"	2009	Producer (with Chuck Harmony)	Rihanna	Rated R
4. "Good Love"	2009	Producer (with The Stereotypes)	Mary J. Blige	Stronger With Each Tear
5. "I Feel Good"	2009	Producer (with Stargate)	Mary J. Blige	Stronger With Each Tear
10. "No More You"	2010	Producer (with Stargate)	Sugababes	Sweet 7
4. "I Don’t Care"	2010	Co-producer (with The Stereotypes)	Raheem DeVaughn	The Love & War MasterPeace
3. "Stay or Go"	2010	Co-producer (with Bei Maejor)	Monica	Still Standing
"Grown Woman"	2010	Songwriter	Kelly Rowland	Non-album single
3. "Man of the House"	2010	Co-producer (with Rykeyz)	Fantasia Barrino	Back to Me
8. "U Get On My Nerves"; (featuring Ne-Yo)	2010	Co-producer (with Bei Maejor)	Jazmine Sullivan	Love Me Back
10. "Truth (Saigo no Shinjitsu)"	2010	Producer (with B Howard)	W-inds	Another World
2. "Pretty Girl Rock"; (featuring Kanye West)	2010	Songwriter	Keri Hilson	No Boys Allowed
2. "I'm a Star"	2010	Songwriter	Chrisette Michele	Let Freedom Reign
8. "So Cool"	2010	Songwriter	Chrisette Michele	Let Freedom Reign
11. "Heaven & Earth"	2011	Producer (with Stargate)	Kelly Rowland	Here I Am
8. "Why Is It So Hard"	2011	Producer (with Chuck Harmony)	Jennifer Hudson	I Remember Me
15. "Do My Thing"	2012	Producer (with Tyler Reynolds and Warren Zavala)	Estelle	All of Me
5. "Make Love to Me"	2012	Producer (with Salaam Remi)	Luke James	Luke James
7. "Right Now"; (featuring David Guetta)	2012	Songwriter	Rihanna	Unapologetic
7. "Plastic Roses"	2013	Songwriter	Jessica Sanchez	Me, You & The Music
4. "Own It"	2013	Producer (with Salaam Remi)	Mack Wilds	New York: A Love Story
8. "Thank You"	2013	Producer (with Jesse "Corparal" Wilson)	Celine Dion	Loved Me Back to Life
6. "No Doubt About It"	2015	Producer (with Jesse "Corparal" Wilson)	Jussie Smollett, Pitbull	Empire cast – Empire: Original Soundtrack Season 2 Volume 1
7. "Ain't About the Money"	2015	Producer (with Jesse "Corparal" Wilson)	Jussie Smollett, Bryshere Y. Gray	Empire cast – Empire: Original Soundtrack Season 2 Volume 1
8. "Never Love Again"	2015	Producer	Jussie Smollett	Empire cast – Empire: Original Soundtrack Season 2 Volume 1
11. "Heavy"	2015	Producer (with Jesse "Corparal" Wilson)	Jussie Smollett	Empire cast – Empire: Original Soundtrack Season 2 Volume 1
4. "Shine on Me"	2016	Producer (with Bostwick)	Jussie Smollett, Bre-Z	Empire cast – Empire: Original Soundtrack Season 2 Volume 2
11. "My Own Thang"	2016	Producer (with Jesse "Corparal" Wilson)	Jussie Smollett	Empire cast – Empire: Original Soundtrack Season 2 Volume 2
19. "Never Let It Die"	2016	Producer (with Jesse "Corparal" Wilson)	Jussie Smollett, Bryshere Y. Gray	Empire cast – Empire: Original Soundtrack Season 2 Volume 2
11. "Sorry Just Don't Cut It"	2016	Producer	Jussie Smollett	Empire cast – The Complete Season 2
13. "Battle Cry"	2016	Producer	Jussie Smollett	Empire cast – The Complete Season 2
18. "Never Love Again"	2016	Producer	Jussie Smollett	Empire cast – The Complete Season 2
19. "Mona Lisa"	2016	Producer	Kelly Rowland	Empire cast – The Complete Season 2
22. "Ear 2 tha Street"	2016	Producer	Mo McRae	Empire cast – The Complete Season 2
25. "Heavy"	2016	Producer	Jussie Smollett	Empire cast – The Complete Season 2
37. "Do Something with it"	2016	Producer	Serayah	Empire cast – The Complete Season 2
48. "Last Night"	2016	Producer	Jussie Smollett, Bre-Z	Empire cast – The Complete Season 2
2. "Two"	2016	Songwriter	Heart	Beautiful Broken
3. "Somebody Does"	2017	Producer (with Jesse "Corparal" Wilson)	La'Porsha Renae	Already All Ready
12. "Stay"	2017	Producer (with Dwayne Washington II)	La'Porsha Renae	Already All Ready
1. "Golden Intro"	2017	Songwriter	Romeo Santos	Golden
3. "Rocket"	2018	Producer (with Curtis "Sauce" Wilson)	En Vogue	Electric Café
1. "Genesis"	2019	Producer (with Tierce "Kizzo" Person)	Ne-Yo	Various artists – Step Up: High Water, Season 2 (Original Soundtrack)
3. "Champion"	2019	Producer (with Jerrol "Boogie" Wizzard)	Ne-Yo	Various artists – Step Up: High Water, Season 2 (Original Soundtrack)
7. "Calling Me"	2019	Producer (with Jesse "Corparal" Wilson)	Ne-Yo	Various artists – Step Up: High Water, Season 2 (Original Soundtrack)
1. "Blame On Me"	2019	Songwriter	Layton Greene	Tell Ya Story – EP
7. "Life After Loneliness"	2021	Songwriter	Donny Osmond	Start Again
6. "What It Do"	2023	Songwriter	Zae France, Fridayy	Rhythm n Backwoods Szn II – EP

== Music videos ==
=== As lead artist ===
List of music videos as lead artist, with directors, showing year released
Title	Year	Director(s)
"Stay" (featuring Peedi Peedi)	2005	Jessy Terrero
"So Sick"	2006	Hype Williams
"When You're Mad"	2006	Little X
"Sexy Love"	2006	Anthony Mandler
"Because of You"	2007	Melina Matsoukas, Omer Ganai
"Do You"	2007	Melina Matsoukas, Omer Ganai
"Can We Chill"	2007	Jessy Terrero
"Go on Girl"	2007	Hype Williams
"Closer"	2008	Melina Matsoukas
"Miss Independent"	2008	Chris Robinson
"Single" (with New Kids on the Block)	2008	Benny Boom
"She Got Her Own" (featuring Jamie Foxx and Fabolous)	2008	Vinroc
"Mad"	2008	Diane Martel
"Part of the List"	2009	Taj
"Never Knew I Needed"	2009	Melina Matsoukas
"Beautiful Monster"	2010	Wayne Isham, Ne-Yo
"Champagne Life"	2010	Wayne Isham, Ne-Yo
"One in a Million"	2010	Wayne Isham, Ne-Yo
"The Way You Move" (featuring Trey Songz and T-Pain)	2011	Clifton Bell
"Think Like a Man" (with Jennifer Hudson featuring Rick Ross)	2012	Chris Robinson
"Burnin' Up"	2012	Chris Robinson
"Lazy Love"	2012	Diane Martel
"Let Me Love You (Until You Learn to Love Yourself)"	2012	Christopher Sims
"Forever Now"	2012	Ryan Pallotta
"Let Me Love You" (Until You Learn to Love Yourself)" (Remix) (featuring French Montana)	2013	Juwan Lee
"Money Can't Buy" (featuring Jeezy)	2014	Chris Robinson
"She Knows" (featuring Juicy J)	2014	Emil Nava
"Coming with You"	2015	Colin Tiley
"Another Love Song"	2017	Darren Craig
"Push Back" (with Bebe Rexha and Stefflon Don)	2018	James Larese
"Me Quedaré Contigo" (with Pitbull featuring Lenier and El Micha)	2019	N/A
"Don't Love Me"	2022	

=== As featured artist ===
List of music videos as featured artist, with directors, showing year released
Title	Year	Director(s)
"Back Like That" (Ghostface Killah featuring Ne-Yo)	2006	Ray Kay
"Minority Report" (Jay-Z featuring Ne-Yo)	2007	Jay-Z
"Make Me Better" (Fabolous featuring Ne-Yo)	2007	Erik White
"Hate That I Love You" (Rihanna featuring Ne-Yo)	2007	Anthony Mandler
"Bust It Baby (Part 2)" (Plies featuring Ne-Yo)	2008	Plies
"Camera Phone" (The Game featuring Ne-Yo)	2008	Kevin Connolly
"By My Side" (Jadakiss featuring Ne-Yo)	2008	Ray Kay
"Knock You Down" (Keri Hilson featuring Kanye West and Ne-Yo)	2009	Chris Robinson
"What You Do" (Chrisette Michele featuring Ne-Yo)	2009	Ray Kay
"Baby by Me" (50 Cent featuring Ne-Yo)	2009	Chris Robinson
"Angels Cry" (Mariah Carey featuring Ne-Yo)	2010	Nick Cannon
"Super High" (Rick Ross featuring Ne-Yo)	2010	F. Gary Gray
"Give Me Everything" (Pitbull featuring Ne-Yo, Afrojack and Nayer)	2011	David Roulsseau
"Leave You Alone" (Young Jeezy featuring Ne-Yo)	2012	Taj
"Let's Go" (Calvin Harris featuring Ne-Yo)	2012	Vince Haycock
"Turn Around" (Conor Maynard featuring Ne-Yo)	2012	Colin Tilley
"Play Hard" (David Guetta featuring Ne-Yo and Akon)	2013	Andreas Nilsson
"Tonight" (Jessica Sanchez featuring Ne-Yo)	2013	Justin Francis
"Times Of Our Lives" (Pitbull, Ne-Yo)	2014	Gil Green
