= Another Love Song (Ne-Yo song) =

Single by Ne-Yo

from the album Good Man (intended)
- Released: May 30, 2017
- Recorded: 2017
- Genre: Dance-pop; disco; funk
- Length: 3:32
- Label: Compound; Motown
- Songwriters: Shaffer Smith; Lukasz Sebastian Gottwald; Henry Russell Walter
- Producers: Cirkut; Dr. Luke

Ne-Yo singles chronology
"Higher Place" (2017)	"Another Love Song" (2017)	"Good Man" (2018)

"Another Love Song" is a song by American R&B singer and songwriter Ne-Yo, originally scheduled to appear on his seventh album Good Man which was released on June 8, 2018. The single was released on May 30, 2017, by Motown Records following the release of the previous appetizer song "Earn Your Love".

"Another Love Song" is a groovy dance-pop song combined with the elements of disco and funk, co-written and produced by Cirkut and Dr. Luke.

== Background and release ==
Ne-Yo's upcoming studio album Good Man is set to be released sometime in September 2017 and serve as the follow-up to the singer's 2015 album Non-Fiction. After the album's first released song "Earn Your Love" premiered online on May 8, 2017, on May 30, 2017, "Another Love Song" premiered online and was released worldwide as digital download.

== Writing and production ==
At 3:32 in length, "Another Love Song" is an up-tempo upbeat jam song which combines elements of dance and funk. T.J. Rose wrote and recorded the song with producers Cirkut and Dr. Luke, and was mixed by Serban Ghenea.

== Music video ==
The music video was released in July 2017.

== Track listing ==
- Digital download
1. "Another Love Song" – 3:32

== Charts ==
Chart (2017)	Peak position
US Rhythmic Airplay (Billboard)	35
