= Charisse Mills =

Trinidadian-American musician

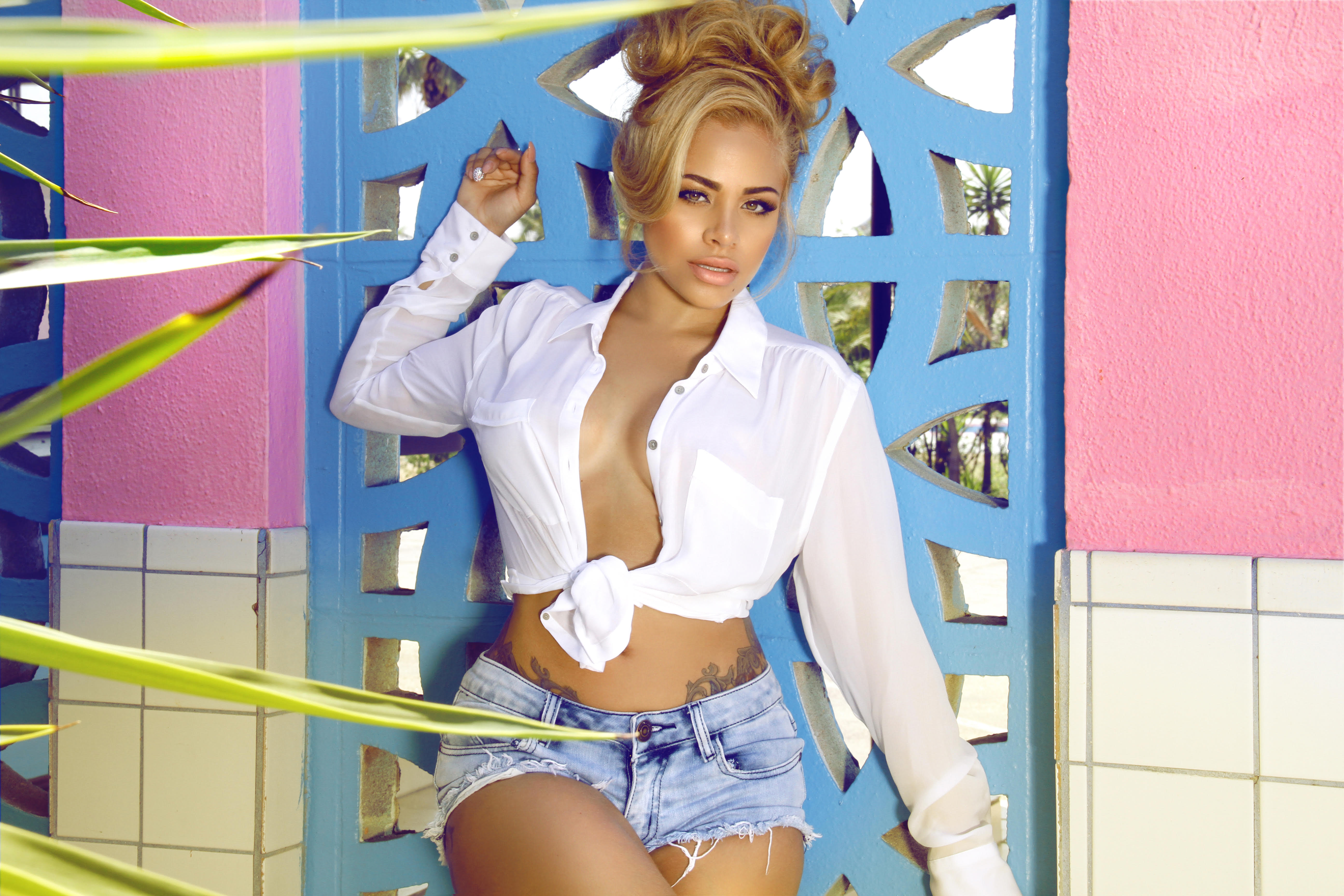
- Pop'era singer and songwriter, Charisse Mills

Background information
- Born: Charisse Mills; January 12, 1988 (age 38); Trinidad and Tobago
- Education: Manhattan School of Music
- Genres: Pop opera
- Occupations: Singer, song-writer, pop opera recording artist
- Website: www.charissemills.com

Charisse Mills is a Trinidadian pop opera singer and songwriter. She is best known for her collaborations with artists Ne-Yo and French Montana, and for her vocal combinations of pop and opera, termed "pop'era".

== Early life ==
Mills was born in Trinidad and Tobago, and moved with her mother Charmaine Mills to Queens, New York. She graduated from Manhattan School of Music.

== Career ==
In an interview with Vocab Magazine, Mills said her interest in opera music began in the eleventh grade. She won accolades performing through the New York State School Music Association. In 2011, Mills performed live at the 2011 NV Awards.

In 2015, R&B artist Ne-Yo featured Mills on "Integrity"” on his album Non-Fiction. Ne-Yo described her as contributing a "beautiful operatic melody" to the song "Integrity" that resulted from a freestyle session with her while recording. Mills' first single, "Champagne", was written by her, French Montana, Warren Zavala and Brandon Howard and features hip-hop artist French Montana. She currently has a single out "Drop A Bag" featuring Luce Cannon.

XXL magazine reported that Mills created her own genre of music with the combination of pop music and opera, called “pop’era.” In an interview with Soul Dynamic, Mills said she infused pop and opera to form "pop’era". Mills has performed opera and R&B at Lincoln Center, in Times Square, and performed for Jesse Jackson's seventieth birthday at Rainbow/PUSH. Mills, along with Charmaine Mills, is the co-founder of C. Moi apparel. C. Moi sponsored the Princess Project, providing custom-made prom dresses to underprivileged youth.
