= Coming with You =

Single by Ne-Yo

from the album Non-Fiction
- Released: April 7, 2015
- Genre: Synthpop; R&B
- Length: 4:20
- Label: Compound; Motown
- Songwriters: Shaffer Smith; Mikkel S. Eriksen; Tor Erik Hermansen
- Producer: Stargate

Ne-Yo singles chronology
| "Time of Our Lives" (2014) | "Coming with You" (2015) | "Higher Place" (2015) |

Music video
- "Coming with You" on YouTube

"Coming with You" is a song performed by American recording artist Ne-Yo, taken from his sixth studio album, Non-Fiction (2015). It was sent to rhythmic radio on April 7, 2015 as the album's third official single.

== Background ==
The song premiered December 15, 2014 before its official release. It was made available for pre-order via iTunes Store on January 5, 2015. It charted internationally prior to its release as a single.

== Track listing ==
- Digital download
1. "Coming with You" – 4:20

== Charts ==
| Chart (2014–15) | Peak position |
|---|---|
| Belgium (Ultratop 50 Flanders) | 42 |
| Belgium (Ultratop 50 Wallonia) | 28 |
| Japan Hot 100 (Billboard) | 32 |
| Scotland Singles (OCC) | 15 |
| UK Singles (OCC) | 14 |
| UK Hip Hop/R&B (OCC) | 3 |
| US Hot R&B Songs (Billboard) | 25 |
| US Rhythmic Airplay (Billboard) | 21 |

== Release history ==
| Region | Date | Format | Label |
|---|---|---|---|
| United States | January 5, 2015 | Digital download (via pre-order of Non-Fiction) | Compound Entertainment; Motown Records |
| Italy | January 23, 2015 | Mainstream radio | Compound Entertainment; Motown Records |
| Germany | February 6, 2015 | Digital download | Compound Entertainment; Motown Records |
| Ireland | February 6, 2015 | Digital download | Compound Entertainment; Motown Records |
| United Kingdom | February 8, 2015 | Digital download | Compound Entertainment; Motown Records |
| United States | April 7, 2015 | Rhythmic radio | Compound Entertainment; Motown Records |
| United States | April 14, 2015 | Mainstream radio | Compound Entertainment; Motown Records |
