= List of awards and nominations received by Ne-Yo =

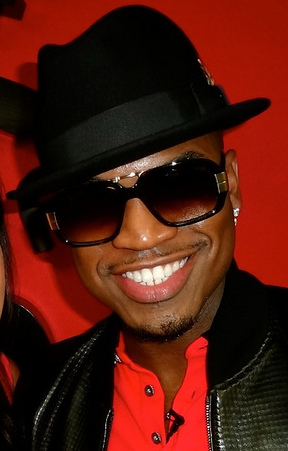
Ne-Yo in 2013

Ne-Yo is an American singer, songwriter, and producer. While a teenager, he wrote songs for other artists, such as Youngstown and Mario, for whom he wrote "Let Me Love You". The song became "one of the most-played songs on urban radio stations across the U.S". Ne-Yo has released four studio albums: In My Own Words (2006), Because of You (2007), Year of the Gentleman (2008), and Libra Scale (2010). His debut album, In My Own Words, was released in early 2006 through Def Jam Recordings and debuted at number one on Billboard 200. More than 301,000 copies were sold in the first week, and the album was certified Platinum by the Recording Industry Association of America after more than two million copies were sold in the United States and four million worldwide. His second album, Because of You, was released in May 2007, and its first single was "Because of You".

Ne-Yo has received several nominations at the Grammy Awards during his career; among these are Best Contemporary R&B Album for In My Own Words, Because of You and Year of the Gentleman, Album of the Year for Year of the Gentleman, Best Male R&B Vocal Performance for "So Sick", "Because of You" and "Miss Independent", Best Male Pop Vocal Performance for "Closer", Best R&B Performance by a Duo or Group for "Hate That I Love You" and Best R&B Song for "Hate That I Love You" and "Miss Independent". The MTV Video Music Awards has nominated Ne-Yo once, in 2008 for Best Dancing in a Video for "Closer". Ne-Yo has also received one award from six nominations at the BET Awards. Overall, Ne-Yo has received eight awards from 31 nominations.

In 2009, Ne-Yo was honored with four awards at the 2009 ASCAP "Rhythm & Soul Awards". Ne-Yo took home awards for "Closer", "Take a Bow", "Miss Independent", and "Bust It Baby II".

== American Music Awards ==
The American Music Awards is an annual awards ceremony created by Dick Clark in 1973. Ne-Yo has received two nominations.

Year	Nominee / work	Award	Result
2006	Ne-Yo	Favorite R&B/Soul Male Artist	Nominated
2007	Ne-Yo	Favorite R&B/Soul Male Artist	Nominated

== BET Awards ==
The BET Awards were established in 2001 by the Black Entertainment Television (BET) network. Ne-Yo has received two awards from seven nominations.

Year	Nominee / work	Award	Result
2006	Ne-Yo	Best New Artist	Nominated
2006	Ne-Yo	Best Male R&B Artist	Nominated
2006	"So Sick"	Viewer's Choice	Nominated
2007	"Because of You"	Viewer's Choice	Nominated
2007	Ne-Yo	Best Male R&B Artist	Won
2008	Ne-Yo	Best Male R&B Artist	Nominated
2009	Ne-Yo	Best Male R&B Artist	Won

== BET Hip Hop Awards ==
The BET Hip Hop Awards is an annual awards show hosted by BET. Ne-Yo has received four nominations.

Year	Nominee / work	Award	Result
2007	"Make Me Better" (with Fabolous)	Best Hip-Hop Collabo	Nominated
2008	"Bust It Baby Pt. 2"	Ringtone of the Year	Nominated
2008	"Bust It Baby Pt. 2"	People's Champ Award	Nominated
2008	"Bust It Baby Pt. 2"	Best Collaboration	Nominated

== Billboard R&B/Hip-Hop Awards ==
The Billboard R&B/Hip-Hop Awards is sponsored by Billboard magazine, and is one of several United States music awards shows (among the others are the Grammy Awards and the American Music Awards).

Year	Nominee / work	Award	Result
2006	Ne-Yo	Top R&B/Hip-Hop Artist	Nominated

== Grammy Awards ==
The Grammy Awards are awarded annually by the National Academy of Recording Arts and Sciences. Ne-Yo has won three awards from 15 nominations.

Year	Nominee / work	Award	Result
2007	"So Sick"	Best Male R&B Vocal Performance	Nominated
2007	In My Own Words	Best Contemporary R&B Album	Nominated
2008	"Because of You"	Best Male R&B Vocal Performance	Nominated
2008	"Irreplaceable" (as a producer)	Record of the Year	Nominated
2008	"Hate That I Love You" (with Rihanna)	Best R&B Performance by a Duo or Group with Vocals	Nominated
2008	"Hate That I Love You" (with Rihanna)	Best R&B Song	Nominated
2008	Because of You	Best Contemporary R&B Album	Won
2009	Year of the Gentleman	Album of the Year	Nominated
2009	Year of the Gentleman	Best Contemporary R&B Album	Nominated
2009	"Closer"	Best Male Pop Vocal Performance	Nominated
2009	"Miss Independent"	Best Male R&B Vocal Performance	Won
2009	"Miss Independent"	Best R&B Song	Won
2009	"Spotlight"	Best R&B Song	Nominated
2010	"Knock You Down" (with Keri Hilson and Kanye West)	Best Rap/Sung Collaboration	Nominated
2013	"Let's Go" (with Calvin Harris)	Best Dance Recording	Nominated
2023	Good Morning Gorgeous (Deluxe)	Album of the Year	Nominated

== MOBO Awards ==
The MOBO Awards is an awards ceremony established in 1995 by Kanya King. Ne-Yo has received two awards from eight nominations.

Year	Nominee / work	Award	Result
2006	"So Sick"	Best Song	Nominated
2006	Ne-Yo	Best International Male	Nominated
2006	Ne-Yo	Best R&B Act	Nominated
2007	"Because of You"	Best Song	Won
2007	Ne-Yo	Best R&B	Won
2008	Ne-Yo	Best R&B/Soul	Nominated
2008	Ne-Yo	Best International Act	Nominated
2010	Ne-Yo	Best International Act	Nominated

== MTV Video Music Awards ==
The MTV Video Music Awards is an annual awards ceremony established in 1984 by MTV. Ne-Yo has received four nominations.

Year	Nominee / work	Award	Result
2008	"Closer"	Best Dancing in a Video	Nominated
2008	"Closer"	Best Editing	Nominated
2009	"Miss Independent"	Best Male Video	Nominated
2011	"Give Me Everything"	Best Collaboration	Nominated
2011	"Give Me Everything"	Best Pop Video	Nominated

== MTV Video Music Awards Japan ==
Year	Nominee / work	Award	Result
2007	So Sick	Best New Artist Video	Won
2007	So Sick	Best R&B Video	Nominated
2008	Because of You	Album of the Year	Nominated
2008	Because of You	Best Male Video	Won
2008	Best Karaokee Song	Best Male Video	Nominated
2009	Year of the Gentleman	Album of the Year	Nominated
2009	Closer	Best Male Video	Nominated
2009	Miss Independent	Best R&B Video	Nominated
2011	Champagne Life	Best R&B Video	Nominated

== People's Choice Awards ==
Year	Nominee / work	Award	Result
2016	Ne-Yo	Favorite R&B Artist	Nominated

== Soul Train Music Awards ==
The Soul Train Music Awards is an annual awards show that honors black musicians and entertainers. Ne-Yo has received two awards from the five nominations.

Year	Nominee / work	Award	Result
2007	Ne-Yo	Best R&B/Soul or Rap New Artist	Won
2007	"Sexy Love"	Best R&B/Soul Male Single	Nominated
2009	"Knock You Down"	Record of the Year	Nominated
2009	"Knock You Down"	Best Collaboration	Won
2009	Year of the Gentleman	Album of the Year	Nominated
