= Push Back =

2018 single by Ne-Yo

Single by Ne-Yo, Bebe Rexha and Stefflon Don

from the album Good Man
- Released: April 17, 2018
- Genre: Dancehall
- Length: 3:41
- Label: Motown
- Songwriters: Shaffer Smith; Mikkel Eriksen; Tor Hermansen; Bleta Rexha; Stephanie Allen
- Producer: Stargate

Ne-Yo singles chronology
"Good Man" (2018)	"Push Back" (2018)	"Apology" (2018)

Bebe Rexha singles chronology
"Home" (2017)	"Push Back" (2018)	"Girls" (2018)

Stefflon Don singles chronology
"Alone" (2018)	"Push Back" (2018)	"Senseless" (2018)

Music video
- "Push Back" on YouTube

"Push Back" is a 2018 dancehall song by American singers Ne-Yo and Bebe Rexha and British singer/rapper Stefflon Don. The song is included on Ne-Yo's seventh studio album Good Man, which was released in June 2018.

== Background ==
Ne-Yo spoke of the song, stating "I love a woman who knows how to move. I love a woman that has her own self, her own heart and mind. She's comfortable with her body. And when her song comes on, she's gonna get up and move. She's gonna show you just how confident and comfortable she is. 'Push Back' is about these women."

== Music video ==
The music video directed by James Larese was released on April 10, 2018.

== Track listing ==
Digital download
No.	Title	Length
1.	"Push Back" (with Bebe Rexha and Stefflon Don)	3:41

== Release history ==
Country	Date	Format	Label	Ref.
Various	March 30, 2018	Digital download	Motown; Capitol	
United States	April 17, 2018	Contemporary hit radio	Motown; Capitol	
Italy	May 25, 2018	Contemporary hit radio	Universal	
