= Good Man (song) =

2018 single by Ne-Yo

Single by Ne-Yo

from the album Good Man
- Released: February 8, 2018
- Length: 3:49
- Label: Compound; Motown
- Songwriters: Shaffer Smith; Darhyl Camper Jr.; D'Angelo; Raphael Saadiq
- Producer: DJ Camper

Ne-Yo singles chronology
"Another Love Song" (2017)	"Good Man" (2018)	"Push Back" (2018)

"Good Man" is a song by American recording artist Ne-Yo, released on February 6, 2018. It was written by Ne-Yo along with Darhyl "DJ" Camper Jr. for his same-titled seventh studio album (2018), while production was helmed by the latter. The song contains a sample of "Untitled (How Does It Feel)" (2000) as performed by D'Angelo. Due to the inclusion of the sample, D'Angelo and co-writer Raphael Saadiq are also credited as songwriters. Serving as the album's lead single, "Good Man" became Ne-Yo's first song to top the US Adult R&B Songs chart.

== Charts ==
Chart (2018)	Peak position
US Adult R&B Songs (Billboard)	1
