= She Knows (Ne-Yo song) =

2014 song by Ne-Yo featuring Juicy J

Single by Ne-Yo featuring Juicy J

from the album Non-Fiction
- Released: September 16, 2014
- Genre: R&B; trap; hip-hop
- Length: 3:34 (album version); 3:08 (radio edit)
- Label: Compound; Motown
- Songwriters: Shaffer Smith; Jordan Houston; Lukasz Gottwald; Henry Walter
- Producers: Dr. Luke; Cirkut

Ne-Yo singles chronology
"Money Can't Buy" (2014)	"She Knows" (2014)	"Time of Our Lives" (2014)

Juicy J singles chronology
"Low" (2014)	"She Knows" (2014)	"Multiply" (2014)

Music videos
- "She Knows" on YouTube
- "She Knows" (Pole Art Ver.) on YouTube

"She Knows" is a song by American singer Ne-Yo, taken from his sixth studio album, Non-Fiction (2015). It features a guest verse by American rapper Juicy J. The song was released on September 16, 2014 by Compound Entertainment and Motown Records, and serves as the lead single from the album following the release of an R&B-tinged first single, "Money Can't Buy". The song was produced by Dr. Luke and Cirkut, with vocal production by Jesse "Corparal" Wilson.

== Critical reception ==
AllMusic's Andy Kellman put it alongside 'She Said I'm Hood Tho' and 'One More' as being "all tough but finely crafted slow jams." Justin Charity of Complex described the song as "the rare, contemporary hit, with obvious appeal to Juicy J and to the rest of us as a clean, big beat swing at urban radio play."

== Remixes ==
The official remix, the "R&B Remix" features Trey Songz, The-Dream and T-Pain. Another official remix, released on February 20, 2015, features Fabolous, French Montana and the original guest Juicy J. The song features vocals from the infamous Crack Kid on Vine. The album remix features a second verse from Juicy J in the beginning of the song.

== Music video ==
A music video was uploaded on YouTube, October 8, 2014. Everywhere Ne-Yo goes, from the grocery store to the library to the office, he sees pole dancing girls. The pole art version was also uploaded on YouTube, November 10, 2014. The video is directed by Emil Nava.

== Track listing ==
- Digital download
1. "She Knows" (featuring Juicy J) – 3:41

== Charts ==
=== Weekly charts ===
Chart (2014–15)	Peak position
Belgium (Ultratip Bubbling Under Flanders)	52
Belgium Urban (Ultratop Flanders)	29
Belgium (Ultratip Bubbling Under Wallonia)	23
Canada Hot 100 (Billboard)	85
France (SNEP)	146
Scotland Singles (OCC)	25
UK Singles (OCC)	28
UK Hip Hop/R&B (OCC)	5
US Billboard Hot 100	19
US Hot R&B/Hip-Hop Songs (Billboard)	6
US Dance/Mix Show Airplay (Billboard)	19
US Pop Airplay (Billboard)	19
US Rhythmic Airplay (Billboard)	2

=== Year-end charts ===
Chart (2015)	Position
US Billboard Hot 100	97
US Rhythmic (Billboard)	17

== Certifications ==
Region	Certification	Certified units/sales
Brazil (Pro-Música Brasil)	Gold	30,000^{‡}
New Zealand (RMNZ)	Platinum	30,000^{‡}
United Kingdom (BPI)	Gold	400,000^{‡}
United States (RIAA)	Platinum	1,000,000^{‡}
^{‡} Sales+streaming figures based on certification alone.

== Release history ==
Region	Date	Format	Label
United States	September 16, 2014	Digital download	Compound Entertainment; Motown Records
United States	September 23, 2014	Urban radio	Compound Entertainment; Motown Records
United States	October 7, 2014	Rhythmic radio	Compound Entertainment; Motown Records
United States	January 13, 2015	Contemporary hit radio	Compound Entertainment; Motown Records
