= Money Can't Buy (song) =

Single by Ne-Yo featuring Jeezy

from the album Non-Fiction
- Released: May 29, 2014
- Recorded: 2014
- Length: 4:22 (album version); 4:13 (radio edit)
- Label: Compound; Motown
- Songwriters: Shaffer Smith; Montay Humphrey; Justin Johnson; Korey Roberson; Dennis Martin; Jesse "Corparal" Wilson; Jay Jenkins; Tony Hester; William DeVaughn
- Producers: DJ Montay; Jaytez; D Lumar; Jesse "Corparal" Wilson

Ne-Yo singles chronology
| "Incredible" (2013) | "Money Can't Buy" (2014) | "She Knows" (2014) |

Young Jeezy singles chronology
| "My Nigga" (2013) | "Money Can't Buy" (2014) | "Seen It All" (2014) |

"Money Can't Buy" is a song by American recording artist Ne-Yo, released on May 29, 2014 as the first single for his sixth studio album Non-Fiction (2015). The song features American rapper Jeezy and was produced by DJ Montay, Jaytez, D Lumar, and Jesse "Corparal" Wilson.

== Track listing ==
- Digital download
1. "Money Can't Buy" (featuring Jeezy) – 4:13

== Charts ==
| Chart (2014) | Peak position |
|---|---|
| US Hot R&B/Hip-Hop Songs (Billboard) | 41 |

== Release history ==
| Country | Date | Format |
|---|---|---|
| United States | May 29, 2014 | Digital download |
| United States | June 3, 2014 | Urban radio |
