= Incredible (Celine Dion and Ne-Yo song) =

2013 single by Celine Dion and Ne-Yo

Single by Celine Dion and Ne-Yo

from the album Loved Me Back to Life
- B-side: "Open Arms"
- Released: 14 February 2014
- Recorded: 2012
- Studio: Chalice (Los Angeles); At the Palms (Las Vegas); MixStar (Virginia Beach)
- Genre: Pop; R&B
- Length: 3:55
- Label: Columbia
- Songwriters: Andrew Goldstein; Emanuel Kiriakou; Shaffer Smith
- Producer: Emanuel Kiriakou

Celine Dion singles chronology
"Loved Me Back to Life" (2013)	"Incredible" (2014)	"The Show Must Go On" (2016)

Ne-Yo singles chronology
"Tonight" (2013)	"Incredible" (2014)	"Money Can't Buy" (2014)

Music video
- "Incredible" on YouTube

"Incredible" is a song by Canadian singer Celine Dion and American singer-songwriter and record producer Ne-Yo. Recorded for Dion's English-language studio album Loved Me Back to Life (2013), it was selected as the second single in North America, most European territories, Australia, and New Zealand. The track was written by Andrew Goldstein, Emanuel Kiriakou, and Ne‑Yo, with Kiriakou also serving as producer.

In mid‑December 2013, "Incredible" received a nomination for World's Best Song at the World Music Awards. In January 2014, NBC selected it as the official anthem of the 2014 Winter Olympics. The digital single—including two rare bonus tracks—was issued on 14 February 2014 in most European countries, as well as Australia and New Zealand. It was serviced to Adult Contemporary radio in the United States on 24 February 2014, and the music video premiered on 4 June 2014. The track was added to BBC Radio 2's B‑List on 12 July 2014 and became the fourth promotional single in the United Kingdom.

== Background ==
Dion and Ne‑Yo—who has written for artists such as Beyoncé Knowles and Rihanna—first collaborated in 2007. Ne‑Yo co‑wrote and co‑produced "I Got Nothin' Left" for Dion's album Taking Chances (2007). In September 2012, Dion's official website announced that the pair had recorded a duet for her forthcoming English‑language album, a detail Ne‑Yo confirmed in March 2013.

Speaking to Digital Spy, Ne‑Yo described the collaboration as "surreal", noting that working alongside Dion rather than writing for her "was a challenge to say the least". He added that Dion's decision to record the track as a duet "made [him] question [his] vocal ability".

In August 2013, Billboard revealed the song's title. Ne‑Yo also contributed and co‑produced "Thank You" for Loved Me Back to Life. "Incredible" was co‑written by Emanuel Kiriakou and Andrew Goldstein. Kiriakou had previously worked with Dion on Taking Chances and My Love: Essential Collection (2008). On Loved Me Back to Life, he also produced "Thankful" and co‑produced "Save Your Soul" with Goldstein and Danny Mercer.

== Release ==
On 24 October 2013, behind‑the‑scenes footage of "Incredible" premiered on Access Hollywood. A day later, Dion's Vevo channel posted a "Making of Incredible" video. On 29 October 2013, shortly before the album's release, the official audio was issued on Vevo. Ne‑Yo announced the single release on 7 November 2013, and Dion's website confirmed it on 13 December 2013. That same day, the track was sent to Contemporary hit radio in Italy, followed by Indonesia on 2 January 2014.

On 14 February 2014, "Incredible" was released as a digital single in most European countries (excluding France and the UK), as well as Australia and New Zealand. The release included two bonus tracks: "Open Arms" from the Japanese edition of Loved Me Back to Life and a remix of "Loved Me Back to Life" by David Morales. The song was later serviced to Adult Contemporary radio in the United States on 24 February 2014 and to UK radio on 12 July 2014. A commercial UK single was planned for 28 July 2014 but withdrawn shortly before release.

== Critical reception ==
"Incredible" received generally positive notices from music critics. Andrew Hampp of Billboard remarked that the track sounds "so massive the Olympic Committee should start bookmarking it for the 2014 Winter Games". AllMusic editor Stephen Thomas Erlewine described it as one of the album's standout moments, describing the song as "soulful," "modern," and "subtle," with a "palpable R&B undercurrent". Gary Graff of The Oakland Press called it a "winner".

Several reviewers were more reserved. Caroline Sullivan of The Guardian wrote that the duet finds Dion "reverting to type with a trite ballad that vows their love will 'go down in history'," though she acknowledged that "their voices do meld soulfully". Elysa Gardner of USA Today described the track as "slick". Eric Henderson of Slant Magazine noted that "Incredible" is a "power ballad" in which Dion and Ne-Yo "trade lines," their voices rendered "shockingly interchangeable" by heavy vocal post‑production.

== Commercial performance ==
On 13 November 2013, supported by digital downloads, "Incredible" debuted at number 44 on the Canadian Hot 100 and at number 22 on the Hot Canadian Digital Songs chart. In the following weeks, it fell to number 78 and then number 88 on the Canadian Hot 100. After Dion and Ne-Yo performed the song on The Voice and A Home for the Holidays in mid‑December 2013, "Incredible" re‑entered the Canadian Hot 100 at number 81 on 25 December 2013. The song also charted on Canadian Adult Contemporary radio, debuting at number 37 on 27 November 2013 and rising to number 33 the following week. It eventually peaked at number 24 on 15 January 2014.

In the United States, "Incredible" entered Billboard's Pop Digital Songs chart at number 24 on 25 December 2013. After being sent to Adult Contemporary radio in February 2014, it debuted at number 28 on the Billboard Adult Contemporary chart on 20 March 2014, becoming Dion's 31st entry on that chart. It peaked at number 25 on 24 April 2014. "Incredible" also charted internationally. On South Korea's Gaon Music Chart, it debuted on 14 November 2013 and climbed to number 12 the following week.

== Music video ==
On 24 January 2014, Dion and Ne-Yo filmed the music video for "Incredible" in Los Angeles. The video premiered on 4 June 2014 on Good Morning America. The following day, it was uploaded to Dion's official Vevo channel. Directed by Zach Merck, the video features rooftop performance scenes intercut with vignettes of people showcasing various talents, as well as a misplaced giraffe wandering through the city.

== Live performances ==
On 3 November 2013, Dion and Ne-Yo performed "Incredible" on Le Banquier in Canada to promote the album, which was released two days later. They also performed the song in the United States on 17 December 2013 during the grand finale of The Voice, and on 18 December 2013 during the CBS 15th annual A Home for the Holidays special, which raises awareness of adoption from foster care. On 31 December 2013, Ne-Yo made a surprise appearance during the New Year's Eve performance of Celine in Las Vegas to perform the duet. On 25 February 2014, Dion officially added "Incredible" to the set list of Celine.

== Formats and track listing ==
- Digital single
1. "Incredible" – 3:55
2. "Open Arms" – 3:08
3. "Loved Me Back to Life" (la vie in stereo radio edit – David Morales) – 4:00

== Credits and personnel ==
Recording

- Recorded at Chalice Recording Studios, Los Angeles, California, and Studio at the Palms, Las Vegas, Nevada
- Vocals recorded at Studio at the Palms, Las Vegas, Nevada
- Mixed at MixStar Studios, Virginia Beach, Virginia

Personnel

- Celine Dion – lead and background vocals
- Ne-Yo – songwriting, lead and background vocals
- Emanuel Kiriakou – songwriting, production, recording engineer, keyboards, programming
- Andrew Goldstein – songwriting, recording engineer, keyboards, programming
- Moses Gallart – recording engineer
- François Lalonde – vocals recording
- Mark Everton Gray – vocals recording assistant
- Pat Thrall – digital editing
- Jens Koerkemeier – digital editing
- Serban Ghenea – mixing
- John Hanes – mixing engineer
- Phil Seaford – mixing engineer assistant

== Charts ==
Chart performance
Chart (2013–2014)	Peak position
Canada Hot 100 (Billboard)	44
Canada AC (Billboard)	24
CIS Airplay (TopHit)	181
Quebec Radio Songs (ADISQ)	25
South Korea (Gaon International Download)	12
US Adult Contemporary (Billboard)	25
US Pop Digital Songs (Billboard)	24

== Release history ==
Release history
Region	Date	Format	Label	Ref.
Italy	13 December 2013	Contemporary hit radio	Columbia	
Indonesia	2 January 2014	Contemporary hit radio	Columbia	
Australia; Europe	14 February 2014	Digital download	Columbia	
United States	24 February 2014	Adult Contemporary radio	Columbia	
United Kingdom	12 July 2014	Adult Contemporary radio	Columbia	
Italy	18 July 2014	Contemporary hit radio (re-release)	Columbia	
