= Highway 79 (album) =

Studio album by Ne-Yo
- Released: July 10, 2026
- Length: 36:56
- Labels: Compound; HSG; 10K Projects
- Producers: Brody Brown; Dave Cohen; Corparal; Bonnie Dymond; Chuck Harmony; Claude Kelly; KP; Luke Laird; Jimmy Robbins; Sean Small; Sam Sumser; Yung Lan

Ne-Yo chronology
Self Explanatory (2022)	Highway 79 (2026)

Singles from Highway 79
- 1. "Simple Things" Released: November 21, 2025; 2. "Up Out & Gone" Released: March 27, 2026; 3. "Ms. Tundra" Released: May 22, 2026; 4. "Thinking What I'm Thinking" Released: June 19, 2026; 5. "Dance Right Now" Released: July 10, 2026

Highway 79 is the tenth studio album by the American singer-songwriter Ne-Yo. It was released on July 10, 2026, through Compound Entertainment, HSG and 10K Projects. It is his first album in almost four years since 2022's Self Explanatory.

== Background and composition ==
Highway 79 was recorded entirely in Nashville, Tennessee. On the Joe and Jada podcast in September 2025, Ne-Yo described the album as a fusion of his signature R&B sound with elements of country music. In an interview with iHeartRadio in March 2026 prior to the album's announcement, Ne-Yo further elaborated on the album's sound, saying that his source of inspiration for the project was "all the things" he admired about country music, but also remarked that explicitly calling it a country album would be "disrespectful [...] when I know for a fact that there are artists that eat, sleep, live, and breathe country music 24 hours a day, seven days a week."

== Promotion ==
The album's lead single, "Simple Things", was released on November 21, 2025. The second single, "Up Out & Gone", was released on March 27, 2026. The third single, "Ms. Tundra", was released in tandem with the album's announcement on May 22, 2026. "Thinking What I'm Thinking" was issued as the fourth single. The fifth "Dance Right Now" was unveiled alongside the album.

== Critical reception ==
Professional ratings
Review scores
Source	Rating
AllMusic	3/5 stars

AllMusic's Andy Kellman wrote: "While nothing is truly substandard, not much sticks. Still, Ne-Yo sounds inspired and as if he's having fun a little outside his comfort zone."

== Track listing ==
Highway 79 track listing
No.	Title	Writer(s)	Producer(s)	Length
1.	"Up Out & Gone"	Shaffer Smith; Milan Modi; Claude Kelly; Chuck Harmony; David Tomasek	Yung Lan; Louis York^{[a]}	2:56
2.	"Hate Me Now"	Smith; Christopher Steven Brown; Jett Harvey; Shelby Keith Porras	Brody Brown; KP	3:09
3.	"Wish I Didn't Know You"	Smith; Sasha Alex Sloan; J. T. Harding; Jimmy Robbins	Robbins	3:11
4.	"Thinking What I'm Thinking"	Smith; Kelly; Harmony	Harmony	4:42
5.	"Dance Right Now"	Smith; Daniel Breland; Sam Sumser; Sean Small	Sumser; Small	3:08
6.	"Ms. Tundra"	Smith; Kelly; Harmony	Harmony	3:12
7.	"Next Round On Me"	Smith; Jesse Wilson	Corparal	3:38
8.	"Simple Things"	Smith; Dave Cohen; Milan Modi; Christian Stalnecker; Madi Yanofsky	Cohen; Lan	2:58
9.	"Only Ever Been You"	Smith; Harmony; Kelly; Emmi Elliot; Bonnie Dymond; John Hall; Tommy Acker	Dymond; Harmony; Kelly	2:58
10.	"Crooked Halo"	Smith; Dymond; Harmony; Kelly	Dymond; Harmony; Kelly	3:12
11.	"If I Roped the Moon"	Smith; Luke Laird; Charles Kelley	Laird	3:52
Total length:				36:56

=== Note ===
- ^{^[a]} indicates an additional producer

== Personnel ==
Credits are adapted from Tidal.

- Ne-Yo – vocals
- Kevin "KD" Davis – mixing, mastering
- Curtis "Sauce" Wilson – vocal production (all tracks), engineering (5, 9–11)
- Michael "Roux" Johnson – engineering (1–3, 6–8)
- Chuck Harmony – arrangement (1, 4, 6, 9)
- Claude Kelly – arrangement (1, 4, 6, 9)
- Calvin Hay – arrangement (1, 4, 9)
- Ilya Toshinskiy – acoustic guitar, banjo, mandolin (1, 9, 10)
- Aaron Sterling – drums, percussion (1, 9, 10)
- Nathan Chapman – bass guitar (1, 9, 10)
- Just Ostrander – electric guitar (1, 9, 10)
- Dan Dugmore – steel guitar (1, 9, 10)
- Erik Hammer – guitars (7)
- Sofia Ostrovska – guitars (7)
- Paris Arditti – engineering (7)
- Virgilio Tzaj – art direction, design
- Shaina Stein – creative direction

== Charts ==
Chart performance for Highway 79
Chart (2026)	Peak position
UK Album Downloads (Official Charts)	48
