= Time of Our Lives (Pitbull and Ne-Yo song) =

2014 single by Pitbull and Ne-Yo

Single by Pitbull and Ne-Yo

from the album Globalization and Non-Fiction
- Released: November 17, 2014
- Recorded: 2014
- Genre: Dance-pop; pop rap
- Length: 3:49
- Label: Mr. 305; Polo Grounds; RCA
- Songwriters: Armando C. Pérez; Lukasz Gottwald; Henry Walter; Shaffer Smith; Vinay Rao; Stephan Taft; Michael "Freakin" Everett
- Producers: Dr. Luke; Cirkut; Lifted

Pitbull singles chronology
"Celebrate" (2014)	"Time of Our Lives" (2014)	"Piensas (Dile la Verdad)" (2014)

Ne-Yo singles chronology
"She Knows" (2014)	"Time of Our Lives" (2014)	"Coming with You" (2015)

Music video
- "Time of Our Lives" on YouTube

"Time of Our Lives" is a song by American rapper Pitbull and American singer Ne-Yo, from the former's eighth studio album Globalization and the latter's sixth studio album Non-Fiction. It was released on November 17, 2014, as the third single from the album by RCA Records. The single was produced by Dr. Luke, Cirkut and Lifted.

The song marks the fourth joint production for co-producers Dr. Luke and Cirkut with Pitbull (after "Timber", "Wild Wild Love", and "We Are One (Ole Ola)") and third for Ne-Yo (after "She Knows" and T-Pain's "Turn All the Lights On"). It became Pitbull's most successful single from Globalization, reaching number nine on the US Billboard Hot 100. "Time of Our Lives" also went to number one on the US Rhythmic chart.

== Music video ==
The music video was first released onto Pitbull's official Vevo channel on December 25, 2014. It was directed by Gil Green. On January 20, 2015, a behind the scenes video was also released on the channel. The video has received over 200 million views, making it 2x Vevo certified.

The video shows Pitbull and Ne-Yo saving up their spare money to save up for a New Year's Eve party in 1999. Pitbull appears in an old school Varsity jacket dancing while Ne-Yo sings along in the crowd of women while sporting a fitted hat and Aviators. American singer and actress Fergie makes a cameo at the party.

== In the media ==
The song is featured in the pilot episode of Cooper Barrett's Guide to Surviving Life, and the 2016 films The 5th Wave and Office Christmas Party.

== Chart performance ==
The single debuted at number 94 on the US Billboard Hot 100 chart, on the week of December 13, 2014. The following week, the song fell off the chart. On the week of January 3, 2015, the song re-entered the chart at number 87. After climbing the chart for three months, the single reached its peak at number nine on the chart. The song is Pitbull's last US top ten hit to date. On October 16, 2020, the single was certified quadruple platinum by the Recording Industry Association of America (RIAA) for combined sales and streaming equivalent units of over four million units in the United States.

== Charts ==
=== Weekly charts ===
Chart (2014–2015)	Peak position
Australia (ARIA)	12
Austria (Ö3 Austria Top 40)	26
Belgium (Ultratip Bubbling Under Flanders)	3
Belgium (Ultratip Bubbling Under Wallonia)	7
Canada Hot 100 (Billboard)	10
Canada CHR/Top 40 (Billboard)	3
Colombia Anglo Airplay (National-Report)	4
Czech Republic Airplay (ČNS IFPI)	52
Czech Republic Singles Digital (ČNS IFPI)	7
Denmark (Tracklisten)	17
Dominican Republic Anglo Airplay (Monitor Latino)	3
Finland (Suomen virallinen lista)	9
France (SNEP)	108
Germany (GfK)	22
Hungary (Dance Top 40)	22
Hungary (Rádiós Top 40)	4
Hungary (Single Top 40)	15
Ireland (IRMA)	36
India International Airplay (Angrezi Top 20)	10
Italy (FIMI)	31
Japan Hot 100 (Billboard)	64
Luxembourg Digital Song Sales (Billboard)	9
Mexico Anglo Airplay (Monitor Latino)	6
Netherlands (Dutch Top 40)	15
Netherlands (Single Top 100)	15
New Zealand (Recorded Music NZ)	12
Norway (VG-lista)	9
Poland Airplay (ZPAV)	7
Poland Dance (ZPAV)	23
Scottish Singles Sales (Official Charts)	23
Slovakia Airplay (ČNS IFPI)	25
Slovakia Singles Digital (ČNS IFPI)	8
Slovenia Airplay (SloTop50)	42
South Africa Airplay (EMA)	4
Spain (Promusicae)	25
Sweden (Sverigetopplistan)	14
Switzerland (Schweizer Hitparade)	35
UK Singles (Official Charts)	27
UK Hip Hop/R&B (Official Charts)	5
US Billboard Hot 100	9
US Hot Rap Songs (Billboard)	1
US Adult Pop Airplay (Billboard)	21
US Dance Club Songs (Billboard)	1
US Latin Airplay (Billboard)	18
US Pop Airplay (Billboard)	4
US Rhythmic Airplay (Billboard)	1

2025–2026 weekly chart performance for "Time of Our Lives"
Chart (2025–2026)	Peak position
Latvia Streaming (LaIPA)	18
Lithuania (AGATA)	29
Poland (Polish Streaming Top 100)	86

=== Year-end charts ===
Chart (2015)	Position
Australia (ARIA)	79
Australia Urban (ARIA)	16
Canada (Canadian Hot 100)	45
Germany (Official German Charts)	96
Hungary (Dance Top 40)	81
Hungary (Rádiós Top 40)	34
Hungary (Single Top 40)	72
Italy (FIMI)	76
Netherlands (Dutch Top 40)	62
Netherlands (Single Top 100)	38
New Zealand (Recorded Music NZ)	30
Poland (ZPAV)	34
Spain (PROMUSICAE)	58
Sweden (Sverigetopplistan)	53
US Billboard Hot 100	39
US Dance Club Songs (Billboard)	36
US Mainstream Top 40 (Billboard)	24
US Hot Rap Songs (Billboard)	6
US Rhythmic (Billboard)	9

== Certifications ==
Region	Certification	Certified units/sales
Australia (ARIA)	2× Platinum	140,000^{‡}
Denmark (IFPI Danmark)	3× Platinum	270,000^{‡}
Germany (BVMI)	Platinum	400,000^{‡}
Italy (FIMI)	Platinum	50,000^{‡}
New Zealand (RMNZ)	7× Platinum	210,000^{‡}
Spain (Promusicae)	Platinum	40,000^{‡}
Sweden (GLF)	Platinum	40,000^{‡}
United Kingdom (BPI)	2× Platinum	1,200,000^{‡}
United States (RIAA)	8× Platinum	8,000,000^{‡}
^{‡} Sales+streaming figures based on certification alone.

== Release history ==
Region	Date	Format	Label
Worldwide	November 17, 2014	Digital download	Mr. 305; Polo Grounds Music; RCA Records
United States	December 12, 2014	Rhythmic contemporary radio	Mr. 305; Polo Grounds Music; RCA Records
Italy	January 30, 2015	Contemporary hit radio	Mr. 305; Polo Grounds Music; RCA Records

== See also ==
- List of number-one dance singles of 2015 (U.S.)
