= Good Man (album) =

Studio album by Ne-Yo
- Released: June 8, 2018
- Genre: R&B; hip hop
- Length: 56:47
- Label: Compound; Motown
- Producer: Ne-Yo; Stargate; Dr. Luke; Curtis "Sauce" Wilson; Made In China; The Stereotypes; Maejor; Dawty Music Group

Ne-Yo chronology
Non-Fiction (2015)	Good Man (2018)	Another Kind of Christmas (2019)

Singles from Good Man
- 1. "Good Man" Released: February 8, 2018; 2. "Push Back" Released: April 17, 2018

Good Man (stylized in all caps) is the seventh studio album by American singer Ne-Yo. The album was released on June 8, 2018, by Compound Entertainment and Motown Records, serving as the follow-up to his sixth album Non-Fiction (2015). The album was preceded by two singles: "Good Man" and "Push Back" featuring Bebe Rexha and Stefflon Don.

== Critical reception ==
Professional ratings
Review scores
Source	Rating
AllMusic	2.5/5 stars
Rolling Stone	2.5/5 stars

Andy Kellman of AllMusic affirmed that Ne-Yo still persists with his "tried-and-true songwriting approach" that ensures that "not one song is poor", but felt that a majority of the tracks on the album fails to stand out; most "[blurring] into one another" and lacking distinction. He selected "U Deserve" and "On Ur Mind" as the notable hits on the record. Elias Leight from Rolling Stone was unimpressed with Ne-Yo's decision to produce "safe" trap-based radio hits, which he deemed "perfectly of-its-moment; profoundly unmemorable." He wrote that Ne-Yo fails to "write his way out of the ordinary with another sterling hook" on his "standard-issue rap/R&B hybrids", nevertheless praising the "pan-Caribbean rhythms" on Good Man where "[Ne-Yo's] winning airiness returns."

== Track listing ==
Good Man tracklisting
No.	Title	Writer(s)	Producer(s)	Length
1.	"Caterpillars 1st (Intro)"	Shaffer Smith	Ne-Yo	0:41
2.	"1 More Shot"	Smith; Brandon Green; Daniel Mizrahi	Maejor; MantraBeats	3:50
3.	"LA Nights"	Smith; Jahron Anthony Brathwaite; Ryan Martinez; Joshua Parker; Terence Jamiel Williams	OG Parker; G. Ry; Tee Romano	3:54
4.	"Nights Like These" (featuring Romeo Santos)	Smith; Lukasz Gottwald; Mathieu Jomphe; Romeo Santos; Henry Walter	Dr. Luke; Cirkut; Billboard	3:24
5.	"U Deserve"	Smith; Erik Norwood; Stacey Owens	Stacey "S.O.S." Owens	3:45
6.	"Summertime"	Smith; Taji Ausar; Joseph M. Hill Jr; Stuart Lowery	Tane Runo; J-Hill; Epikh Pro	2:54
7.	"Push Back" (with Bebe Rexha and Stefflon Don)	Smith; Bleta Rexha; Stephanie Allen; Mikkel Storleer Eriksen; Michael Collins Ajereh	Stargate	3:41
8.	"Breathe"	Smith; Ray McCullough; Jacob Richards; Ray Romulus; Jonathan Yip	The Stereotypes	4:03
9.	"On Ur Mind" (featuring PartyNextDoor)	Smith; Gottwald; Jahron Anthony Brathwaite; Walter	MADE IN CHINA; Cirkut	3:22
10.	"Back Chapters"	Smith; Eric Bellinger; Curtis Wilson	Rochad Holiday; Curtis "Sauce" Wilson	4:10
11.	"Hotbox" (featuring Eric Bellinger)	Smith; Bellinger; C. Wilson	C. Wilson	4:15
12.	"Over U"	Smith; M. S. Eriksen	Stargate	3:28
13.	"Without U"	Smith; M. S. Eriksen; Green	Stargate; Maejor	3:14
14.	"Apology"	Smith; Bellinger; Darhyl "DJ" Camper Jr.; Devin Montgomery	DJ Camper; Montgomery	4:07
15.	"Ocean Sure" (featuring Candice Boyd and Sam Hook)	Smith; Gottwald; Samuel Jean; Walter	MADE IN CHINA; Cirkut	3:44
16.	"The Struggle… (Interlude)"	Smith	Ne-Yo	0:26
17.	"Good Man"	Smith; Camper Jr.; Michael Archer; Raphael Saadiq	DJ Camper	3:49
Total length:				56:47

Notes

- "Good Man" samples "Untitled (How Does It Feel)" as performed by D'Angelo.

== Charts ==
Chart (2018)	Peak position
US Billboard 200	33
US Top R&B/Hip-Hop Albums (Billboard)	17
