= Non-Fiction (Ne-Yo album) =

Studio album by Ne-Yo
- Released: January 27, 2015
- Genres: R&B; hip hop; pop
- Length: 53:50 (US); 45:50 (International)
- Labels: Compound; Motown
- Producers: StarGate; Dr. Luke; Cirkut; David Banner; Lifted; Montay Humphrey; Jesse "Corparal" Wilson; David Guetta; Giorgio Tuinfort

Ne-Yo chronology
R.E.D. (2012)	Non-Fiction (2015)	Good Man (2018)

Singles from Non-Fiction
- 1. "Money Can't Buy" Released: May 29, 2014; 2. "She Knows" Released: September 16, 2014; 3. "Time of Our Lives" Released: November 17, 2014; 4. "Coming with You" Released: February 6, 2015

Non-Fiction is the sixth studio album by American recording artist Ne-Yo. The album was released on January 27, 2015, by Compound Entertainment and Motown Records, serving as the follow-up to his fifth album R.E.D. (2012). The album was preceded by two singles: "Money Can't Buy" featuring Jeezy and "She Knows" featuring Juicy J.

Upon its release, the album was met with mixed reviews from music critics. The album reached number five on the US Billboard 200, selling 59,000 copies in its first week, making it the third album to miss the pinnacle of the chart since Libra Scale (2010) and also becoming the second male R&B artist to have six consecutive top 10 albums following Chris Brown in 2014.

== Singles ==
"Money Can't Buy" featuring Jeezy was released via digital download on May 29, 2014, as the first single from Non-Fiction in North America; it was later sent to US urban contemporary radio on June 3, 2014. The song peaked at number 17 on the US Bubbling Under Hot 100 Singles chart, a listing of the top twenty-five songs that have yet to enter the main Hot 100, while charting at number 41 on the US Hot R&B/Hip-Hop Songs chart.

"She Knows" featuring Juicy J was released via digital download on September 16, 2014, as the album's lead single (second overall) in North America; it was sent to US urban contemporary, rhythmic, and contemporary hit radio. The single reached number 19 on the US Billboard Hot 100, while charting at number six on the US Hot R&B/Hip-Hop Songs chart, number two on the US Rhythmic Songs chart, and number 19 on the US Pop Songs chart.

"Time of Our Lives" with Pitbull was released via digital download on November 17, 2014, as the fifth single from Pitbull's album, Globalization, while also appearing on Non-Fiction; it was sent to US rhythmic radio on December 12, 2014. It became the best-performing release from Non-Fiction, peaking at number nine on the US Billboard Hot 100. It also peaked at number one on the US Rhythmic Songs chart and at number four on the US Pop Songs chart. The song performed moderately in international markets, peaking within the top twenty in Canada and New Zealand, while charting within the lower regions of charts in Australia, Ireland, and the United Kingdom. Its music video was released on December 25, 2014.

"Coming with You" was sent to mainstream radio stations in the United States on April 14, 2015, as the fourth official single after being issued as the first international single in February.

=== Promotional singles ===
In promotion for the album's release, several songs were released via iTunes Store as promotional singles in the weeks leading up to the album's release. "Coming with You" was released as the first on January 5, 2015. "Religious" and "Who's Taking You Home" followed on January 13, 2015, with "Religious" serving as the second international promotional single and the latter as the second in North America.

== Critical reception ==
Professional ratings
Aggregate scores
Source	Rating
Metacritic	60/100
Review scores
Source	Rating
AllMusic	4/5 stars
Complex	2/5 stars
Entertainment Weekly	A−
Exclaim!	7/10
The Guardian	2/5 stars
The Observer	3/5 stars
Pitchfork	6.4/10
Rolling Stone	2.5/5 stars
Slant Magazine	2/5 stars

Non-Fiction received mixed reviews from music critics. At Metacritic, which assigns a weighted average rating out of 100 from selected independent ratings and reviews from mainstream critics, the album received an average score of 60, which indicates "mixed or average reviews", based on 12 reviews. Andy Kellman of AllMusic praised tracks such as "She Knows" and "One More" as "tough but finely crafted slow jams," while describing "Coming with You" as "a dazzling Stargate production" with a hip-house influence. He concluded that Non-Fiction contained "more standouts than any Ne-Yo album since Because of You." Killian Fox of The Observer called the album "a smooth operator," praising Ne-Yo's nuanced approach to R&B storytelling, his "ultra-smoothness," and the contrast between his romantic perspective and the more explicit contributions of guest artists. Writing for Exclaim!, Del F. Cowie described the album as "an uneven synthesis" of sounds Ne-Yo had previously explored, arguing that it reflected "an underlying need to placate his various audiences" rather than delivering the straightforward R&B record initially promised.

Evan Rytlewski of Pitchfork noted that Non-Fiction saw Ne-Yo embrace more contemporary sounds and darker themes. He added that the album balanced R&B and pop influences more effectively than R.E.D., though it fell short of the songwriting standards of Year of the Gentleman. Rolling Stone's Chuck Arnold criticized the album's inconsistent execution of its concept, noting that Ne-Yo was strongest on tracks influenced by Michael Jackson and Marvin Gaye, such as "Coming with You" and "Integrity," rather than on its more contemporary material. Andrew Le from Renowned for Sound called Non-Fiction an "uneven, yet still entertaining" collection, praising Ne-Yo's ability to draw from personal experiences and social media stories while showcasing his vocal versatility and storytelling skills. Complex editor Justin Charity gave a more negative assessment, calling the album a "fire sale of songs no one else bought" and criticizing its inconsistent production, awkward themes, and shift from Ne-Yo's traditionally romantic persona. He argued that songs such as "She Knows" and "Good Morning" displayed moments of strength but were undermined by the album's lack of cohesion. Tshepo Mokoena of The Guardian alled the album "flatly uninventive," praising Ne-Yo's "flexible" falsetto and rich tenor while criticizing its repetitive subject matter and lack of originality.

== Commercial performance ==
The album debuted at number five on the US Billboard 200, selling 59,000 copies in its first week. The album opened at the top spot of the R&B/Hip-Hop Albums chart. As of March 2015, the album sold over 108,000 in the US.

In 2015, Non-Fiction was ranked as the 140th most popular album of the year on the Billboard 200.

== Track listing ==
Non-Fiction — North American standard version
No.	Title	Writer(s)	Producer(s)	Length
1.	"Run" (featuring Schoolboy Q)	Shaffer Smith; Quincy Hanley; Dwane Weir II; Dan Croll; Joe Wills	Key Wane	3:07
2.	"Integrity" (featuring Charisse Mills)	Smith; Darhyl "DJ" Camper, Jr.	Camper, Jr.	3:54
3.	"One More" (featuring T.I.)	Smith; John Glass; Clifford Harris, Jr.	Glass John	4:18
4.	"Who's Taking You Home"	Smith; David Guetta; Giorgio Tuinfort	Guetta; Tuinfort	3:49
5.	"Time of Our Lives" (with Pitbull)	Smith; Armando C. Pérez; Lukasz Gottwald; Stephan Taft; Henry Walter; Al Burna	Dr. Luke; Cirkut; Lifted	3:49
6.	"Coming with You"	Smith; Mikkel S. Eriksen; Tor Erik Hermansen	Stargate	4:20
7.	"Good Morning"	Smith; Shea Taylor	Taylor	3:19
8.	"Make It Easy"	Smith; Camper, Jr.	Camper, Jr.	3:37
9.	"Money Can't Buy" (featuring Jeezy)	Smith; Montay Humphrey; Justin Johnson; Korey Roberson; Dennis Martin; Jesse "Corparal" Wilson; Jay Jenkins; Tony Hester; William DeVaughn	DJ Montay; Jaytez^{[c]}; D Lumar^{[c]}; Wilson^{[a]}	4:22
10.	"Religious"	Smith; Lavell Crump; Charles Dickerson	David Banner; Mono/Poly^{[c]}	3:49
11.	"She Knows" (featuring Juicy J)	Smith; Jordan Houston; Gottwald; Walter	Dr. Luke; Cirkut; Wilson^{[b]}	3:34
12.	"She Said I'm Hood Tho" (featuring Candice)	Smith; Taylor; Philip Eugene Perry	Taylor; Wilson^{[b]}	4:05
13.	"Story Time"	Smith; Taylor	Taylor	3:15
14.	"Congratulations"	Smith; Wilson; Brandon Hodge	Wilson	4:32
Total length:				53:50

Non-Fiction — International standard version
No.	Title	Writer(s)	Producer(s)	Length
1.	"Run" (featuring Schoolboy Q)	Shaffer Smith; Quincy Hanley; Dwane Weir II		3:07
2.	"Integrity" (featuring Charisse Mills)	Smith; Camper, Jr.		3:54
3.	"One More" (featuring T.I.)	Smith; Clifford Joseph Harris, Jr.		4:18
4.	"Who's Taking You Home"	Smith; David Guetta; Giorgio Tuinfort	Guetta; Tuinfort	3:49
5.	"Time of Our Lives" (with Pitbull)	Smith; Armando C. Pérez; Lukasz Gottwald; Henry Walter; Stephan Taft	Dr. Luke; Cirkut; Lifted	3:49
6.	"Coming with You"	Smith; Mikkel S. Eriksen; Tor Erik Hermansen	Stargate	4:20
7.	"Good Morning"	Smith; Shea Taylor		3:19
8.	"Money Can't Buy" (featuring Jeezy)	Smith; Montay Humphrey; Justin Johnson; Korey Roberson; Dennis Martin; Jesse "Corparal" Wilson; Jay Wayne Jenkins; Tony Hester; William DeVaughn	Montay Humphrey; Jesse "Corparal" Wilson	4:22
9.	"Religious"	Smith; Lavell Crump; Charles Dickerson	David Banner; Mono/Poly^{[c]}	3:49
10.	"She Knows" (featuring Juicy J)	Smith; Jordan Houston; Gottwald; Walter	Dr. Luke; Cirkut	3:34
11.	"Story Time"	Smith; Taylor		3:15
12.	"Ballerina"	Smith; Stephan Moccio; J. Wizzard; Wilson	Stephan Moccio; J. Wizzard; Wilson	4:14
Total length:				45:50

Non-Fiction — North American deluxe version
No.	Title	Writer(s)	Producer(s)	Length
1.	"Non-Fiction (Intro)"	Smith; Wilson	Wilson; The Kaliphat	1:27
2.	"Everybody Loves / The Def of You (Interlude)"	Smith; Camper, Jr.	Camper, Jr.	3:19
3.	"Run (featuring Schoolboy Q) / An Island (Interlude)"	Smith; Hanley; Weir II; Dan Croll; Joe Wills	Key Wane	3:36
4.	"Integrity" (featuring Charisse Mills)	Smith; Camper, Jr.	Camper, Jr.	3:54
5.	"One More" (featuring T.I.)	Smith; Glass; Harris, Jr.	Glass John	4:18
6.	"Time of Our Lives" (with Pitbull)	Smith; Pérez; Gottwald; Taft; Walter; Burna	Dr. Luke; Cirkut; Lifted	3:49
7.	"Who's Taking You Home"	Smith; Guetta; Tuinfort	Guetta; Tuinfort	3:48
8.	"Coming with You"	Smith; Eriksen; Hermansen	Stargate	4:19
9.	"Let You What..." (interlude)	Smith	Smith	0:42
10.	"Take You There"	Smith; Camper, Jr.	Camper, Jr.; Wilson^{[a]}^{[b]}	3:54
11.	"Good Morning / Gon' Ride (Interlude)"	Smith; Taylor	Taylor	3:39
12.	"Make It Easy"	Smith; Camper, Jr.	Camper, Jr.	3:37
13.	"Money Can't Buy" (featuring Jeezy)	Smith; Humphrey; Johnson; Roberson; Martin; Wilson; Jenkins; Hester; DeVaughn	DJ Montay; Jaytez^{[c]}; D Lumar^{[c]}; Wilson^{[a]}	4:22
14.	"Religious / Rachet Wit Yo Friends (Interlude)"	Smith; Crump; Dickerson	Banner; Mono/Poly^{[c]}	4:03
15.	"She Knows" (featuring Juicy J)	Smith; Houston; Gottwald; Walter	Dr. Luke; Cirkut; Wilson^{[b]}	3:34
16.	"She Said I'm Hood Tho" (featuring Candice)	Smith; Taylor; Perry	Taylor; Wilson^{[b]}	4:05
17.	"Story Time"	Smith; Taylor	Taylor	3:12
18.	"Why"	Smith; Stacey "S.O.S." Owens; Erik Norwood	Owens; Wilson^{[b]}	2:36
19.	"Congratulations"	Smith; Wilson; Hodge	Wilson	4:31
20.	"Come Over" (Bonus track)	Smith; Wilson; Jerry Duplessis		4:16
21.	"Ballerina" (Bonus track)	Smith; J. Wizzard; Wilson; Stephan Moccio		4:14
Total length:				75:17

Non-Fiction — International deluxe version (bonus tracks) / Target exclusive tracks
No.	Title	Writer(s)	Producer(s)	Length
20.	"Worth It"	Smith; Wilson; Chucky Thompson; Carlton Mays, Jr.; Erik Hammer	Wilson; Thompson^{[a]}; Da Honorable C.N.O.T.E.^{[a]}	3:55
21.	"Body on You"	Smith; Camper, Jr.	Camper, Jr.; Wilson^{[b]}	3:53
Total length:				74:35

Notes

- ^{^[a]} signifies an additional producer
- ^{^[b]} signifies a vocal producer
- ^{^[c]} signifies a co-producer
- "Run" contains interpolations from "From Nowhere" as performed by Dan Croll, and written by Croll and Joe Wills.
- "Money Can't Buy" contains elements from "Nothing Can Stop Me" as performed by Marilyn McCoo and Billy Davis, Jr., and written by Tony Hester. Contains interpolations from "Be Thankful for What You Got" as written and performed by William DeVaughn.
- "She Said I'm Hood Tho" samples a portion of "Do I Stand a Chance" as performed by The Montclairs, and written by Philip Eugene Perry.

== Charts ==
=== Weekly charts ===
Chart (2015)	Peak position
Australian Albums (ARIA)	25
Belgian Albums (Ultratop Flanders)	56
Belgian Albums (Ultratop Wallonia)	134
Dutch Albums (Album Top 100)	44
French Albums (SNEP)	147
German Albums (Offizielle Top 100)	75
Irish Albums (IRMA)	78
Japanese Albums (Oricon)	25
New Zealand Albums (RMNZ)	29
Scottish Albums (Official Charts)	38
Swiss Albums (Schweizer Hitparade)	59
UK Albums (Official Charts)	16
UK R&B Albums (Official Charts)	2
US Billboard 200	5
US Top R&B/Hip-Hop Albums (Billboard)	1

=== Year-end charts ===
Chart (2015)	Peak position
US Billboard 200	140
US Top R&B/Hip-Hop Albums (Billboard)	23
US R&B Albums (Billboard)	9
