= Ne-Yo =

American singer (born 1979)

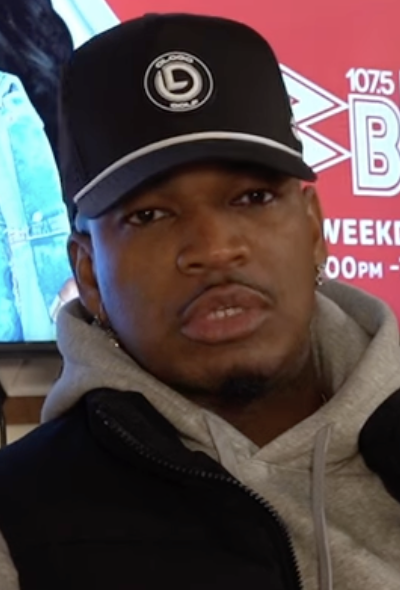
- Ne-Yo in 2025
- Born: Shaffer Chimere Smith; October 18, 1979 (age 47); Camden, Arkansas, U.S.
- Other name: Gogo
- Occupations: Singer; songwriter; record producer; dancer; actor
- Years active: 1998–present
- Works: Discography; production
- Spouse: Crystal Renay Williams (m. 2016; div. 2023)
- Partner: Monyetta Shaw (2009–2013)
- Children: 7
- Awards: Full list
- Musical career
- Origin: Las Vegas, Nevada, U.S.
- Genres: R&B; pop; hip-hop soul
- Labels: Compound; Motown; Def Jam; 10K Projects
- Website: neyothegentleman.com

Shaffer Chimere Smith (born October 18, 1979), known professionally as Ne-Yo (/ˈniːjoʊ/ NEE-yoh), is an American singer, songwriter, record producer, and actor. He first gained recognition for his songwriting abilities after having written Mario's 2004 single "Let Me Love You", the success of which led to a recording contract with Def Jam Recordings under then-president Jay-Z the next year. Regarded as a preeminent figure in 2000s R&B music, he is the recipient of numerous accolades—including three Grammy Awards.

His 2005 single, "So Sick", marked his commercial breakthrough, peaking atop the Billboard Hot 100 by the following year. The song, along with the follow-up singles "When You're Mad" and "Sexy Love", preceded the release of his debut studio album, In My Own Words (2006), which debuted atop the Billboard 200 and was critically praised. It also earned two nominations at the 49th Annual Grammy Awards and received platinum certification by the Recording Industry Association of America (RIAA), in addition to similar certifications in the UK, Japan and Australia.

His second and third studio albums, Because of You (2007) and Year of the Gentleman (2008), continued his commercial success, reaching numbers one and two on the Billboard 200, respectively. Because of You won Best Contemporary R&B Album at the 50th Annual Grammy Awards, while Year of the Gentleman was nominated for the same award and for Album of the Year. The albums spawned the U.S. top-ten singles "Because of You", "Closer", and "Miss Independent"; the latter won Best Male R&B Vocal Performance and Best R&B Song at the 51st Annual Grammy Awards. Year of the Gentleman was certified double platinum by the RIAA and triple platinum by the British Phonographic Industry (BPI).

Libra Scale (2010), Ne-Yo's fourth studio album, was met with moderate success on international charts and reached number nine on the US Billboard 200. Seeing an overall decline in commercial reception, he parted ways with Def Jam and signed with its fellow Universal Music Group subsidiary, Motown, as both a recording artist and short-tenured label executive.. His fifth album, R.E.D. (2012), peaked at number four on the chart and was preceded by the single "Let Me Love You (Until You Learn to Love Yourself)", which peaked at number six on the Billboard Hot 100 and peaked atop the UK Singles Chart. His sixth album, Non-Fiction (2015), was met with similar commercial response in spite of a steep critical decline. It was supported by the Billboard Hot 100-top ten single "Time of Our Lives" (with Pitbull) and top 40 single, "She Knows" (featuring Juicy J). His seventh album, Good Man (2018), peaked at number 33 on the Billboard 200, while his eighth and ninth albums, Another Kind of Christmas (2019) and Self Explanatory (2022), narrowly entered the chart.

Alongside his recording career, Ne-Yo served as a judge for the reality competition series World of Dance from 2017 to 2020 alongside Jennifer Lopez and Derek Hough. In 2021, Ne-Yo competed as Badger on the second season of The Masked Singer UK, and finished in second place. In 2023, he competed on the tenth season of The Masked Singer, as the Cow and finished in first place. According to Recording Industry Association of America, Ne-Yo has sold 29 million certified albums and singles in the United States. Billboard ranked "Give Me Everything" and "Knock You Down" among the Greatest Songs of the Summer of all time. Ne-Yo has yielded five number one singles on the UK Singles Chart, and spent 315 weeks within the chart's Top 75. Ne-Yo also has four songs listed on Motown's Top 100 songs of the Millennium in the UK—the fifth most entries on the list.

== Early life ==
Shaffer Chimere Smith was born on October 18, 1979, in Camden, Arkansas, to parents Lorraine and Shaffer Smith, both of whom are also musicians. As a young child, he was raised by his mother after she separated from his father. His mother then relocated the family to Las Vegas, Nevada.

While in the Las Vegas Academy, Smith adopted the stage name GoGo and joined an R&B group called Envy, who appeared during amateur night on Showtime at the Apollo and on the short lived MTV series The Cut (hosted by Lisa "Left Eye" Lopes of TLC). The group disbanded in 2000, and Smith continued to write songs for other artists before starting his solo career. The stage name Ne-Yo was coined by Big D Evans, a producer with whom Ne-Yo once worked, because Evans claimed that Ne-Yo sees music like the character Neo sees the Matrix.

== Music career ==
=== 1998–2005: Career beginnings ===
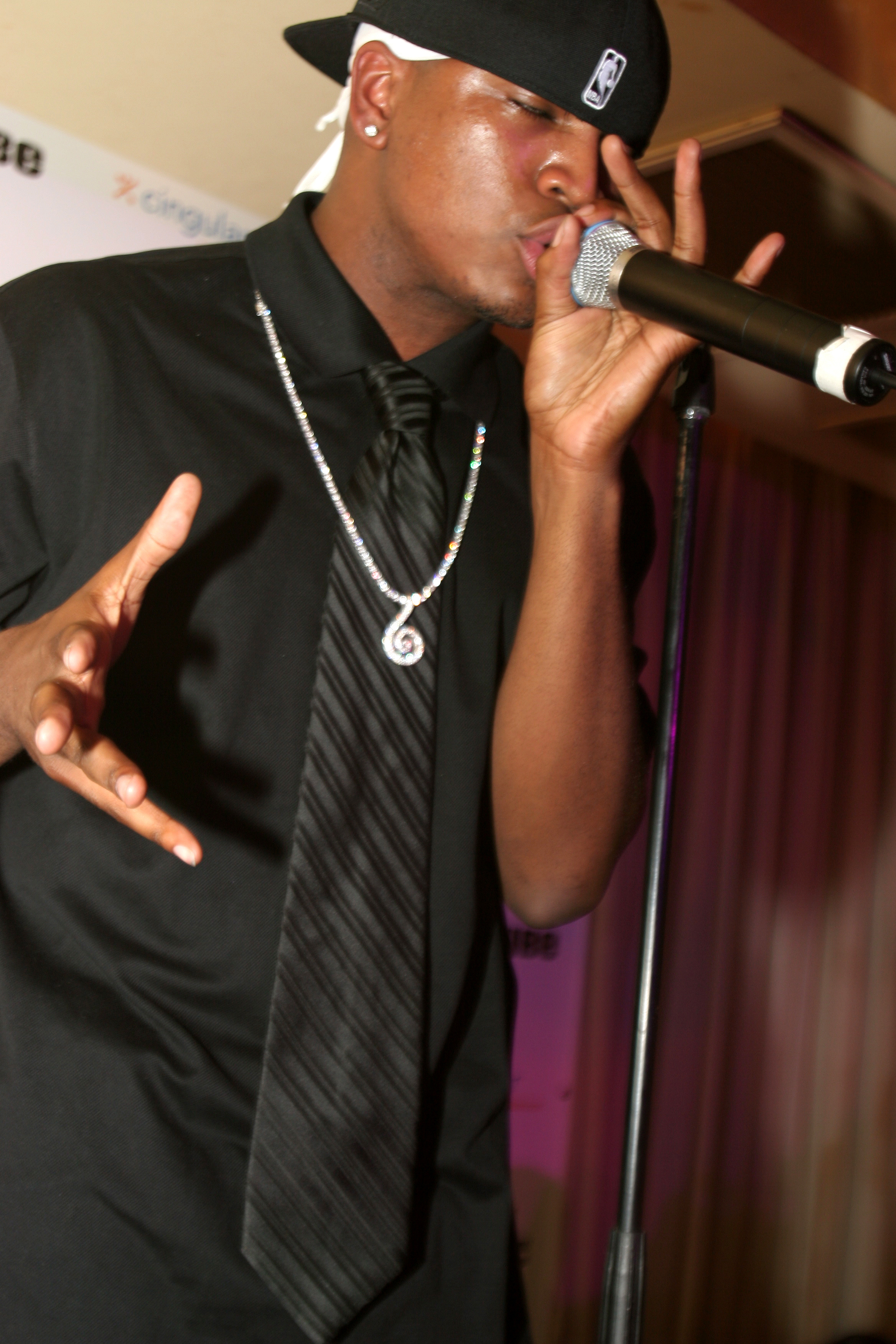
Ne-Yo performing in July 2005

After Envy disbanded in 2000, Columbia Records signed Ne-Yo, but the label dropped him before he could release his already-recorded first album. American singer Marques Houston happened to hear "That Girl", which Ne-Yo had planned to release as his debut single from his then-unreleased album. Houston re-recorded the song and released it as a single for his 2003 album MH. The release of the song led to Ne-Yo being recognized as a top songwriter.

For the next two years, Ne-Yo continued writing songs, some of which have not been officially released. He contributed songs to American singer Teedra Moses's 2004 album Complex Simplicity, Christina Milian's It's About Time, and the American boy band Youngstown, none of which, however, brought Ne-Yo much mainstream attention. Ne-Yo has also contributed songs to singers Mary J. Blige, B2K, Faith Evans, and Musiq, among others.

A breakthrough came when Ne-Yo wrote "Let Me Love You" for American singer Mario. The song reached number one on the Billboard Hot 100, and later stayed at the top spot for nine weeks. After the successful release, Tina Davis, former A&R representative for Def Jam Recordings, arranged an informal meeting with label head L.A. Reid. Despite not seeking a new contract at the time, then-CEO of Def Jam Jay-Z signed Ne-Yo to a new deal after he performed for the label's executives.

=== 2006–2007: In My Own Words and Because of You ===
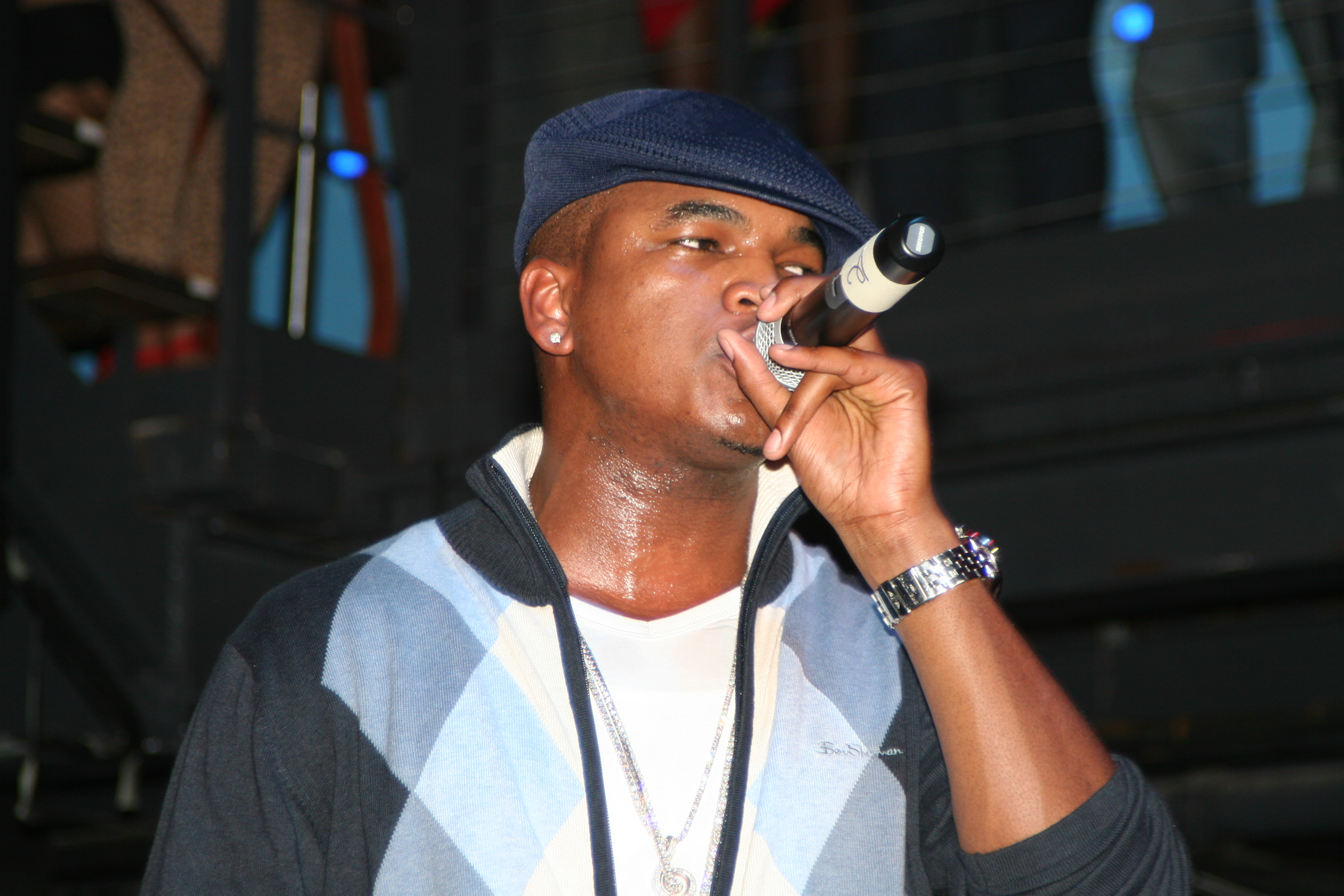
Ne-Yo promoting Because of You in 2007

In early 2006, Ne-Yo released his debut album, In My Own Words, through Def Jam. Boosted by its popular second single "So Sick", the album debuted at number one on Billboard 200, selling over 301,000 copies in its first week on sale. During the same week, the single had reached number one on the Billboard Hot 100. Later singles released were "When You're Mad" and "Sexy Love", which peaked at number 15 and number seven, respectively. The album has been certified platinum by the Recording Industry Association of America (RIAA) for a shipment of over one million units.

His second album, Because of You, was released on May 1, 2007, and, fueled by its lead single, debuted at number one on the Billboard 200, selling 251,000 copies in the United States; the feat gave Ne-Yo his second number-one album. The first single from the platinum-selling album was the title track, which peaked at the number-two spot. Despite the success of "Because of You", later singles released charted lower and were unable to reach the Top 20. The album has been certified platinum by RIAA for a shipment of over one million units. In December 2007, Ne-Yo and the Goo Goo Dolls performed at a fund-raising concert for the then–presidential candidate Senator Barack Obama.

=== 2008–2010: Year of the Gentleman and Libra Scale ===
Ne-Yo's third album, Year of the Gentleman, was released internationally on August 5, 2008. Speaking to noted UK R&B writer Pete Lewis of the award-winning Blues & Soul, Ne-Yo explained the thinking behind its title: "To me Year of the Gentleman is all about a persona, a swag and a charm. I made an assessment of the music business. And, in my personal opinion, the essence of the gentleman is absent right now. Everybody kinda looks the same, everybody's kinda doing the same thing, everybody's kinda rude and full of themselves. Whereas a gentleman is calm, courteous, kind, charming... So that title basically represents me trying to lead by example, and showing these cats what it is to be a gentleman in this business still."

The album sold 250,000 copies in its first week in the United States, debuting on the Billboard 200 at number two. Reviews for the album were positive: in one, Caryn Ganz of Rolling Stone magazine wrote that Year of the Gentleman is "actually a superb concept album about what a great boyfriend he [Ne-Yo] can be". The first two singles, "Closer" and "Miss Independent", peaked at number seven on the Billboard Hot 100. The album was nominated for Best Contemporary R&B Album and Album of the Year at the 2009 Grammy Awards, "Closer" for Best Male Pop Vocal Performance, and "Miss Independent" for Best Male R&B Vocal Performance and Best R&B Song. Year of the Gentleman has been certified platinum by RIAA for a shipment of more than one million copies. The third single, "Mad", peaked at number 11 on the Billboard Hot 100.

On August 12, 2008, the New Kids on the Block released "Single", the second single from their fifth studio album, The Block, which is a duet with Ne-Yo. Ne-Yo included a solo version of the song on his album Year of the Gentleman. In December 2008, Ne-Yo performed at the Kennedy Center Honors as part of the tribute to Barbra Streisand; he sang and danced to the song "Lover Come Back to Me", which Streisand recorded on her second album in 1963. In 2009, Billboard ranked him as the 57th Artist of the 2000s decade. On September 2, 2009, Ne-Yo released greatest hits album Ne-Yo: The Collection in Japan. The album was also released with a limited edition CD+DVD edition complete with the music videos of singles. It debuted at number four on Japan's Oricon weekly albums chart, selling 55,625 copies in the first week.

In January 2010, Ne-Yo was featured in a duet with singer Mariah Carey titled "Angels Cry". In June 2010, Ne-Yo released the single "Beautiful Monster", which became Ne-Yo's third number-one single on the UK Singles Chart. It peaked at number 53 on the Billboard Hot 100 chart. On October 8, 2010, Ne-Yo performed some of his songs from the new album at P.C. Richard & Son Theater in New York City, an event hosted by iHeartRadio. Ne-Yo made an appearance at New York ComicCon to announce that he was collaborating with Stan Lee for a Libra Scale comic. Ne-Yo also met with fans for pictures and autographs in the Cultyard of the ComicCon. The second and third singles released from the album are "Champagne Life" and "One in a Million", respectively.

Libra Scale was released on November 22, 2010. It received critical acclaim from music critics, but was a commercial disappointment, debuting at number nine on the US Billboard 200 chart, selling less than all of his previous three studio albums. Ne-Yo stated: "The album is based upon this short story which basically follows these three characters who are forced to choose between money-power-and-fame versus love. Which in turn is why I've called it 'Libra Scale'. You know, its whole concept is based on that question of morality – that, if you weighed it all out on a libra scale, which one of those two options would you choose?". Libra Scale sold 112,000 copies in its first week. In the United Kingdom, the album debuted at number 11 on the UK Albums Chart, while debuting at number one on the UK R&B Chart.

=== 2011–2012: R.E.D. ===
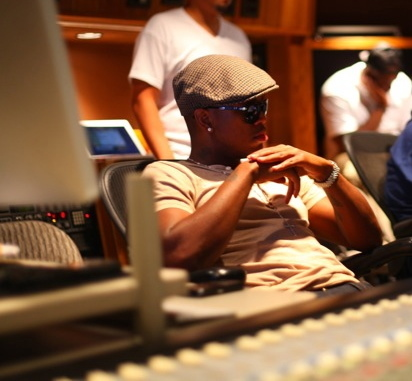
Ne-Yo in a recording studio in 2011

On February 25, 2011, while on his tour in the United Kingdom, he announced his new album would be called Love and Passion and would be released in September, but this was proven false as the title was tentative. American rapper Fabolous said in an interview that he is planning a collaboration album with Ne-Yo as well. Ne-Yo has also written songs for Mary J. Blige, JB, Beyoncé, Monica, Alexandra Burke, Cheryl Cole, and Willow Smith's upcoming albums. Ne-Yo starred in two motion pictures, the long-gestating George Lucas project Red Tails, released in early 2012, and Battle: Los Angeles, which was released in the United States on March 11, 2011. Ne-Yo has already finished writing songs for American singer and Roc Nation artist Alexis Jordan and her self-titled debut album as well as Jennifer Hudson for her second studio album, I Remember Me, which had a North American release on March 22, 2011. Ne-Yo appeared in the children's preschool show The Fresh Beat Band and was one of the few artists not to cancel appearances in the wake of the 2011 Japan earthquake.

In the spring of 2011, Ne-Yo featured alongside Nayer and Afrojack on Pitbull's single "Give Me Everything", which peaked at number one on the Billboard Hot 100, giving Ne-Yo his second US number-one single, his first since 2006's "So Sick" and his first as a guest artist. Ne-Yo also revealed in an interview that he would like to collaborate with Chris Brown, Lil Wayne, and Drake on his upcoming album.

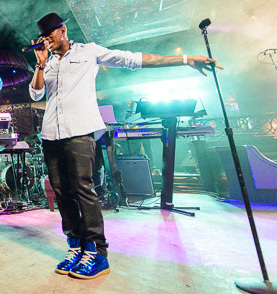
Ne-Yo performing songs from R.E.D. in 2012

In January 2012, it was reported that Ne-Yo, along with his label imprint Compound Entertainment, had moved from Def Jam Recordings to Motown Records. He was also appointed vice president of Motown, serving as a producer, songwriter, mentor, and talent scout. Ne-Yo was slated to release his fifth studio album, R.E.D. (as in "Realizing Every Dream"), on September 18, 2012. The album was initially titled The Cracks in Mr. Perfect. The album's first official single, "Lazy Love", was released on June 12, 2012, and peaked at number forty-two on the US Hot R&B/Hip-Hop Songs chart. "Let Me Love You (Until You Learn to Love Yourself)", co-written by Australian singer-songwriter Sia, was released as the second single on July 31, 2012. The song peaked at number seven on the Billboard Hot 100 and became Ne-Yo's fifth number-one song in the United Kingdom. Because of Kevin McCall's new album and the song Ne-Yo will be in, "Love Time", was not yet released because he and his friend Chris Brown will make an appearance on Ne-Yo's R.E.D. album in the song called "What I Do", which they all will be involved in writing the beat says Ne-Yo, who was interviewed by TMZ in New York. "I expect this to be a banger in clubs for the slow songs and to get Ne-Yo his first top 10 song in years," said Chris Brown, after a celebrity basketball game with Ne-Yo, Kevin Hart, and other celebrities in the month of July.

On August 29, 2012, Ne-Yo was one of the headliners alongside R&B recording artist Melanie Fiona, in the Summer Beats Concert Series, otherwise known as the MJ Birthday Concert, which was on what would have been the 54th birthday of the late American pop icon Michael Jackson which was sponsored by and live-streamed by Pepsi and Billboard. He performed a medley of hits, as well as performing "The Way You Make Me Feel", "Smooth Criminal" and "I Just Can't Stop Loving You" from Jackson's best-selling 1987 album, Bad, in preparation for the reissue of Bad 25 on September 18, 2012. The concert took place at Gotham Hall in New York City. R.E.D. was released in the United Kingdom on November 5, and in North America on November 6, 2012. On December 8, 2012, Ne-Yo was the musical guest for Saturday Night Live with Jamie Foxx guest-hosting for that week.

In 2012, Ne-Yo was awarded the Hal David Starlight Award of the Songwriter's Hall of Fame which honors gifted songwriters who are at an apex in their careers and are making a significant impact in the music industry via their original songs.

=== 2013–2019: Non-Fiction and Good Man ===
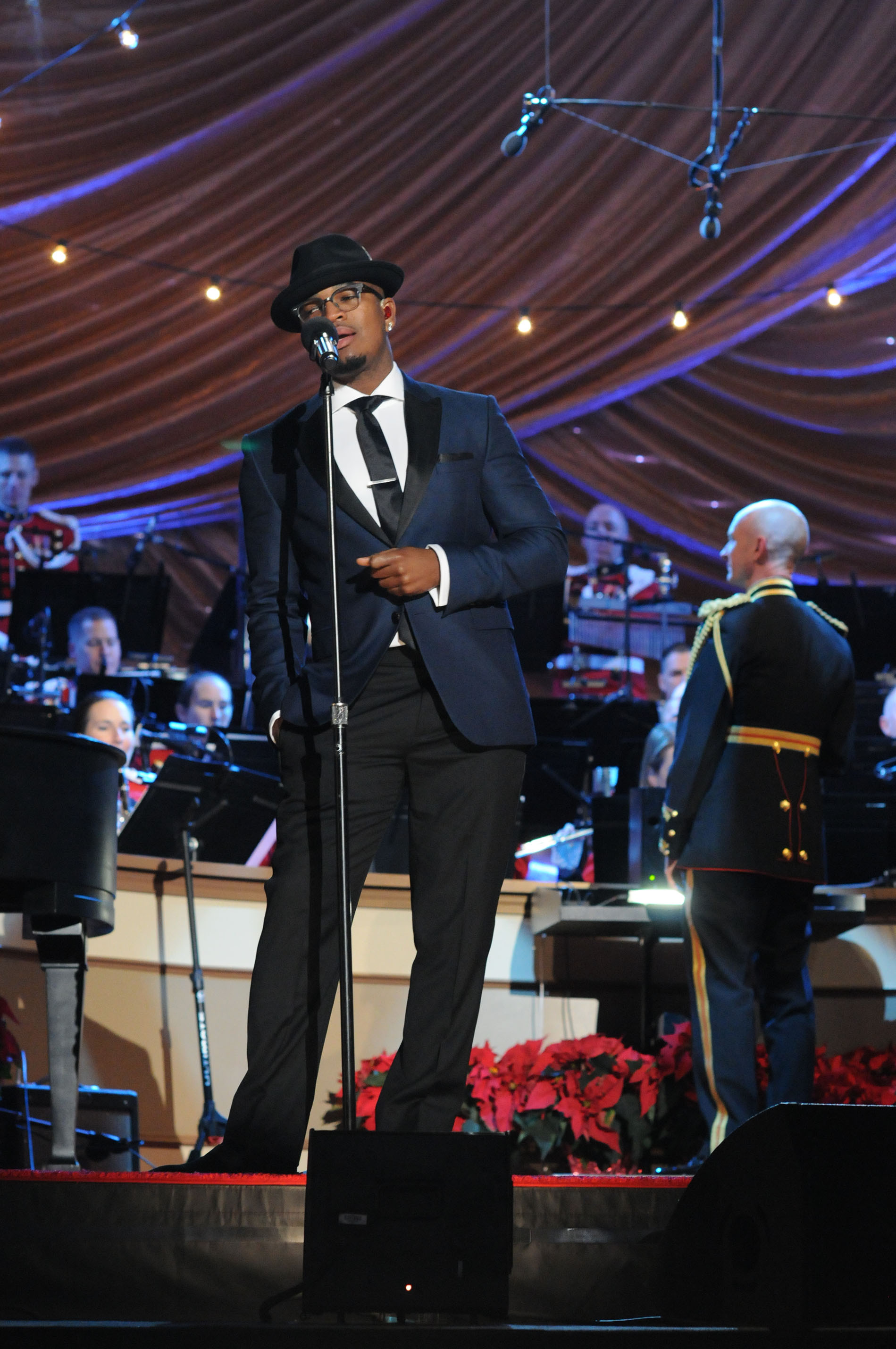
Ne-Yo performing at the National Christmas Tree lighting ceremony in December 2014

In March 2013, Ne-Yo collaborated with Akon on David Guetta's single "Play Hard", from his 2012 album Nothing but the Beat 2.0. He also collaborated with Jessica Sanchez on her single "Tonight" from her debut album Me, You & the Music. The single, along with the music video was released on March 21, 2013. In April, Ne-Yo and Cher Lloyd collaborated on their single "It's All Good", which eventually was featured on Fruttare commercials. Around the same time, he and Celine Dion recorded "Incredible" for Dion's 2013 album Loved Me Back to Life. "Incredible" was released as a single in February 2014 and the music video premiered in June 2014.

On May 29, 2014, Ne-Yo announced his upcoming sixth studio album would be called Non-Fiction. That same day, he announced a new single, "Money Can't Buy". On September 16, 2014, the lead single from "Non Fiction" was sent to mainstream radio titled "She Knows" featuring Juicy J. A few months later, Ne-Yo announced that the new release date for Non-Fiction was January 27, 2015. The album included collaborations with Pitbull and Charisse Mills. The album peaked at number five on the Billboard 200 chart.

In July 2015, Ne-Yo collaborated with Dimitri Vegas & Like Mike on a new song for the Tomorrowland anthem titled "Higher Place". In 2016, Ne-Yo collaborated with Yunel and J Alvarez for their single entitled "Sin Miedo", released on November 12, 2016, and with Diamond Platnumz for their single entitled "Marry You", released on February 2, 2017.

On May 8, 2017, Ne-Yo released a single "Earn Your Love" for his forthcoming seventh album, Good Man, whilst announcing that the album is slated for a release in 2017. A new single, "Another Love Song" was released on May 30, 2017. He also made a cameo in the comedy film Girls Trip, starring Queen Latifah, Jada Pinkett Smith, and Regina Hall.

Ne-Yo's seventh album, Good Man, was released on June 18, 2018, via Compound Entertainment and Motown Records. This was in conflict with his previous announcement, where he said he would release it in 2017.

=== 2020–present: Self-Explanatory, The Masked Singer, and Tours ===
On March 27, 2020, Ne-Yo collaborated with Jamaican dancehall singer Charly Black for the single "Over Again".

From 2020 to 2021, Ne-Yo competed as "Badger" in the second season of the British version of The Masked Singer. He finished as the runner-up to Joss Stone as "Sausage". He also confirmed that his eighth album, previously titled Sweet Escape, had been renamed Self Explanatory. It was released on Motown Records on July 15, 2022.

In 2023, Ne-Yo competed in season ten of The Masked Singer as "Cow" where he finished 1st, winning the competition.

On November 21, 2025, Ne-Yo released the single "Simple Things", a country-tinged ballad produced by Dave Cohen and Yung Lan and released through Compound Entertainment and 10K Projects. A visualizer followed shortly after on December 2, 2025.

On December 4, 2025, Ne-Yo made his Broadway debut in Hell's Kitchen, a semi-autobiographical jukebox musical by Alicia Keys, playing the role of Davis.

Ne-Yo began his Nights Like This tour alongside Akon on April 24, 2026 in Dublin.

On July 10, 2026, Ne-Yo released his tenth studio album, Highway 79, which combines his "signature R&B vocals with Southern sounds and country influences."

== Artistry ==
=== Musical style and influences ===
Ne-Yo's music is generally R&B, while he also incorporates pop and hip-hop occasionally. His musical influences include Michael Jackson, Luther Vandross, Babyface, Blackstreet, and Usher. Ne-Yo is noted for his tenor voice, including his application of falsetto in his works.

=== Songwriting and production ===
Ne-Yo frequently co-writes with Tor Erik Hermansen and Mikkel S. Eriksen of the Norwegian production team Stargate. Ne-Yo met them in a hallway at Sony Music Studios in New York, and knowing the team produced R&B records, decided to collaborate with them. The collective's early works were tracks from In My Own Words, including "So Sick".

Aside from working on his own album, Ne-Yo also collaborates with several other artists. His works include: Rihanna's top-ten singles "Unfaithful", "Russian Roulette", and her number-one hit "Take a Bow", Mario Vazquez's "Gallery", Paula DeAnda's "Walk Away (Remember Me)", and Beyoncé Knowles' Billboard Hot 100 number-one single "Irreplaceable", which stayed at the top of the chart for ten consecutive weeks. He wrote the song "I'm You" for Leona Lewis's debut album Spirit, and is currently writing songs for her next album and for the debut album of fellow X Factor winner Alexandra Burke. He has also been working with Sugababes for their seventh album, with member Keisha Buchanan confirming that Ne-Yo had written a song called "No More You" for their album.

In 2010, he dueted with Mariah Carey on "Angel's Cry", a song for her cancelled album, Angels Advocate. Ne-Yo has also written songs for Celine Dion, Whitney Houston, Carrie Underwood, Anastacia, Ciara, Corbin Bleu, Enrique Iglesias, and Dima Bilan. He collaborated with Lindsay Lohan on her new material, having already finished "Bossy", a pre-single for her new album Spirit in the Dark. In 2007, Ne-Yo confirmed that he had been contacted by producer will.i.am to work on what would have been Michael Jackson's new album. However, at the time of Jackson's death, Ne-Yo's collaborations with him had yet to move past the writing stage. In an interview in 2010, Ne-Yo said that, since Jackson's death, he had been confused as what to do with the songs, as he felt that selling them to another artist or even releasing the songs himself would be disrespectful to Jackson's legacy. In 2009, he wrote "Truth (Saigo no Shinjitsu)" for the Japanese pop group w-inds.

Ne-Yo ventured out to open his own recording studio, called Carrington House, in Atlanta, Georgia. He also had started his own production company, Compound Entertainment, in 2007, and has hired several producers and songwriters in hopes of turning it into a full-fledged record label. It successfully became a label, and artists such as RaVaughn, Paula Campbell, Sixx John, Adrienne Bailon and Shanell are now associated with Compound.

== Other ventures ==
=== Television ===
In 2011, Ne-Yo was approached by Cartoon Network to help create an animated series. Ne-Yo announced that the show would be titled I Heart Tuesday and that he had created it for his sister. He also stated that he wanted to avoid having the show resemble the anime art style of The Boondocks due to the potential cost of the show's animation style. The series has since been believed to have been quietly cancelled.

Ne-Yo appeared in an episode of the seventh season of CSI: NY as a hit-man, under his birth name of Shaffer Smith.

In 2011, Ne-Yo appeared in an episode of The Fresh Beat Band as himself.

He starred as the Tin Man in NBC's musical telecast adaptation of The Wiz alongside David Alan Grier, Elijah Kelley, Queen Latifah, Common, Amber Riley, Uzo Aduba and Mary J. Blige. The musical telecast premiered December 3, 2015 as a three-hour event. For his performance, he received a Critics' Choice Award nomination for Best Supporting Actor in a Movie made for Television or Limited Series. In May 2018, he took part in the Celebrity Ninja Warrior special for Red Nose Day. He completed the course, resulting in a $30,000 donation.

In December 2018, he was the entertainment at 67th Miss Universe pageant where he performed during the opening and final catwalk.

=== Philanthropy ===
Ne-Yo is passionate about the arts and children and has shown his support for Little Kids Rock by filming a PSA for the organization.

=== Sports management ===
In November 2024, Ne-Yo began a stint in sports management, signing boxer Paul Bamba as his first fighter. Ne-Yo was initially introduced to boxing through his uncles when he was younger and he participated in martial arts classes. Later in life, boxing was incorporated into his workout routine, where he would meet Bamba. Bamba would become the World Boxing Association's cruiserweight champion in December 2024, and broke Mike Tyson's record for most boxing wins in a calendar year via knockout, with 14 KO's. Bamba died on December 27th, 2024, 6 days after winning the championship.

== Personal life ==
=== Family ===
In 2005, Jessica White, Ne-Yo's girlfriend at the time, gave birth to a boy. Ne-Yo later discovered the child was not his.

In June 2010, Ne-Yo told Ebony that he and his then-girlfriend, Monyetta Shaw, were expecting their first child together – a girl due early in 2011. Shaw gave birth prematurely to a daughter in November 2010. Announcing the birth, Ne-Yo said, "I've been in love before but this feels like nothing I've ever felt... like I'm in love for the first time." Shaw and Ne-Yo's son was born in October 2011. They broke up in 2013.

In September 2015, the singer announced that he and Crystal Renay Williams were engaged and expecting a child. They were married on February 20, 2016. A son was born to them in March 2016. Their second son was born in June 2018. In February 2020, Ne-Yo announced that he and Crystal would end their marriage, and he withdrew his divorce case afterwards. The pair reconciled during the onset of the COVID-19 pandemic in 2020, with Ne-Yo telling CBS chat show The Talk: "Before the quarantine happened, we were definitely talking divorce, and the quarantine forced us to sit still, block out the noise from the world – you know the world can get very, very loud, and we tend to let the world's opinion mean more in certain situations than it should."

Ne-Yo and Crystal's third child, a daughter, was born in June 2021. In April 2022, the couple renewed their vows in a Las Vegas ceremony. Four months later, Crystal filed for divorce, with allegations of Ne-Yo fathering a child outside of marriage. On January 26, 2023, Ne-Yo and Crystal finalized their divorce. Ne-Yo fathered two sons, born in 2021 and 2023, to influencer Sade Jenea Bagnerise.

In 2019, in wake of the television documentary, Surviving R. Kelly, Ne-Yo confirmed his support for the Mute R. Kelly campaign.

In 2025, he revealed being in polyamorous relationships with four women.

=== Legal issues ===
On February 19, 2008, Ne-Yo was arrested for reckless driving and driving without a valid license after driving through Cobb County, Georgia in his 2006 Range Rover. It was reported that he was doing about 150 mph, 100 mph over the speed limit. On June 2, 2008, Ne-Yo pleaded guilty to the driving without a valid license charge and no contest to the reckless driving charge. He was sentenced to 24 hours of community service.

In 1998, Ne-Yo signed a management agreement with David Wallace for seven years that Wallace would provide professional management services for Ne-Yo in exchange for 15%. But shortly after, the singer moved to Los Angeles where his career started to blossom. Tanya Wallace maintains David Wallace tried to contact Ne-Yo several times by telephone but was unsuccessful. In 2007, Wallace filed a complaint against Smith in district court, seeking damages for breach of contract and other claims. While litigation was pending, Wallace divorced his wife, Tanya, and the divorce decree awarded Tanya one-half of the proceeds from any future judgment in the lawsuit. The district court later dismissed the case and while Wallace's appeal was pending, he died in 2012.

On August 22, 2011, Ne-Yo was sued along with rapper Pitbull and DJ Afrojack by actress Lindsay Lohan, claiming that their song "Give Me Everything" referenced her by name in the lyrics. A judge ruled that Pitbull's use of her name was protected by the First Amendment and that Lohan was barely mentioned in the song. Pitbull then won the lawsuit.

On March 22, 2023, Ne-Yo was revealed to have been charged by the United States Securities and Exchange Commission for violating investor-protection laws. Ne-Yo settled the charges for over $400,000 without admitting or denying the claims.

=== Views on transgender people ===
During a television appearance in 2023, Ne-Yo made comments that were critical of transgender youth and gender affirming care for children. He added: "I just personally come from an era where a man was a man and a woman was a woman. And there was two genders, and that's just how I rocked. You could identify as a goldfish if you feel like, I don't care. That ain't my business. It becomes my business when you try to make me play the game with you. I'm not gonna call you a goldfish. But if you wanna be a goldfish, you go be a goldfish". He later posted an apology for his comments. The following day, Ne-Yo retracted his apology and suggested that the apology had come from a publicist.

== Discography ==
Studio albums

- In My Own Words (2006)
- Because of You (2007)
- Year of the Gentleman (2008)
- Libra Scale (2010)
- R.E.D. (2012)
- Non-Fiction (2015)
- Good Man (2018)
- Another Kind of Christmas (2019)
- Self Explanatory (2022)
- Highway 79 (2026)

== Tour ==
- Champagne and Roses Tour (2023–2024)

== Filmography ==
=== Film ===
Year	Title	Role	Notes
2006	Save the Last Dance 2	Mixx	Video
2007	Stomp the Yard	Rich Brown	
2011	Battle: Los Angeles	Specks	
2012	Red Tails	Andrew 'Smoky' Salem	
2015	Sharknado 3: Oh Hell No!	Secret Service Agent Deveroux	TV movie
2015	The Wiz Live!	The Tin-Man	TV movie
2017	Girls Trip	Himself	
2017	Down by Love	Martin (voice)	Short
2021	Hip Hop Family Christmas	Jayson Shannon	TV movie
2022	Hip Hop Family Christmas Wedding	Jayson Shannon	TV movie
2022	The Sound of Christmas	Quentin	

=== Television ===
Year	Title	Role	Notes
2005	CosmoGIRL! Spy	Himself	Episode: "Ne-Yo"
2006	Walmart Soundcheck	Himself	Episode: "Ne-Yo"
2006	It's Showtime at the Apollo	Himself	Episode: "Ne-Yo/Ghostface Killah"
2006	Top of the Pops	Himself	Episode: "Episode #43.12" & "#43.24"
2007	MTV Cribs	Himself	Episode: "Episode #14.3"
2007	SBC Blue Room	Himself	Episode: "Ne-Yo"
2007	Wild 'n Out	Himself	Episode: "Ne-Yo"
2007	The City That Never Sleeps	Himself	Episode: "2008 Spring/Summer Hugo Boss Fashion Show"
2008	Las Vegas	Himself	Episode: "Guess Who's Coming to Breakfast"
2008	The Real Housewives of New York City	Himself	Episode: "Fashion Week"
2008	All My Children	Himself	Episode: "Episode #1.9878" & "#1.9879"
2009	Kathy Griffin: My Life on the D-List	Himself	Episode: "I Heart Lily Tomlin"
2009	The Electric Company	Himself	Recurring Cast: Season 1
2010	Popstars: Girls forever	Himself	Episode: "Popstars: Girls forever"
2010	Private Sessions	Himself	Episode: "Ne-Yo"
2010	The Real Housewives of Atlanta	Himself	Episode: "Model Behavior"
2010	Hot 50 of 2010 Countdown	Himself	Episode: "30 to 20... Avant, Doug E. Fresh"
2010	Pop Profiles	Himself	Episode: "Usher" & "Rihanna"
2011	The Fresh Beat Band	Himself	Episode: "Band in a Jam"
2011	The X Factor	Himself	Episode: "Live Season Finale, Part 2 of 2"
2011	CSI: NY	The Handsome Man	Episode: "Smooth Criminal"
2012	90210	Himself	Episode: "99 Problems"
2012	Empire Girls: Julissa and Adrienne	Himself/Adrienne's Mentor	Episode: "Triple Threat, Baby!" & "Oh Say Can You See"
2012	The X Factor	Himself/Guest Mentor	Episode: "Judges Home Visit 1 & 2"
2012	Never Mind the Buzzcocks	Himself/Host	Episode: "Episode #26.6"
2012	X Factor	Himself/Guest Mentor	Episode: "Das große Finale"
2012	Saturday Night Live	Himself	Episode: "Jamie Foxx/Ne-Yo"
2012	Huff Post's BV 365	Himself	Episode: "Ne-Yo and Luke James"
2012	The Voice	Himself/Adviser	Recurring Adviser: Seasons 2-3
2012-13	American Idol	Himself	Episode: "Top 7 Results" & "Episode #12.22"
2013	Styled to Rock	Himself/Guest Mentor	Episode: "Hollywood Glam For Khloe"
2015	Ridiculousness	Himself	Episode: "Ne-Yo"
2015	Follow Me	Himself	Episode: "Ne-Yo"
2015	Empire	Himself	Episode: "Be True"
2016	Kocktails with Khloé	Himself	Episode: "Raise Your Glass"
2016	America's Got Talent	Himself/Guest Judge	Episode: "Judge Cuts 1"
2016	The Mindy Project	Marcus	Episode: "Baby Got Backslide" & "The Greatest Date in the World"
2016	TripTank	All Voices for Loud Ninja (voice)	Episode: "Sick Day"
2017	Lip Sync Battle	Himself	Episode "Taye Diggs vs. Ne-Yo"
2017-19	Hollywood Game Night	Himself/Celebrity Player	Recurring Guest
2017-20	World of Dance	Himself/Judge	Main Judge
2018	American Ninja Warrior	Himself	Episode "Red Nose Day: Celebrity Ninja Warrior"
2018-23	Step Up: High Water	Sage Odom	Main Cast
2019	The Substitute	Himself	Episode: "Ne-Yo"
2020	Nickelodeon's Unfiltered	Himself	Episode: "Porcupines Rock High Tops!"
2020-21	The Masked Singer UK	Badger	Contestant: Season 2
2022	Urban One Honors	Himself/Host	Main Host
2022	Basketball Wives	Himself	Episode: "Episode #10.4"
2022	Dance Monsters	Himself/Panelist	Main Panelist
2023	Soul of a Nation	Himself	Episode: "Soul of a Nation Presents: Black in Vegas"
2023	Celebrity Game Face	Himself	Episode: "Music Hitmakers Edition"
2023	Black Pop: Celebrating the Power of Black Culture	Himself	Episode: "Music"
2023	The Masked Singer	Contestant	Performed as "Cow" in Season 10, winner
2024	BMF	Rodney 'Greeny' Green	Recurring Cast: Season 3

== Awards and nominations ==
Ne-Yo has received several nominations at the Grammy Awards during his career, winning three; Best Contemporary R&B Album for Because of You, Best Male R&B Vocal Performance and Best R&B Song for "Miss Independent". The MTV Video Music Awards has nominated Ne-Yo in 2008 for Best Dancing in a Video for "Closer".
