= Ne-Yo: The Collection =

Compilation album by Ne-Yo
- Released: September 2, 2009 (Japan)
- Recorded: 2005–2008
- Genre: R&B
- Label: Universal Music Japan
- Producers: Ne-Yo; Stargate; Eric Hudson; The Heavyweights; Ron "Neff-U" Feemster; Shea Taylor; Chuck Harmony; J. R. Rotem

Ne-Yo chronology
Year of the Gentleman (2008)	Ne-Yo: The Collection (2009)	Libra Scale (2010)

Ne-Yo: The Collection is the first compilation album by American singer-songwriter Ne-Yo. The album was released in Japan on September 2, 2009. The album was also released with a limited edition CD+DVD version complete with the music videos from each of Ne-Yo's singles under the title "Ne-Yo: The Collection - Complete Edition".

== Track listing ==
CD
No.	Title	Length
1.	"Because of You"	4:26
2.	"So Sick"	3:27
3.	"Sexy Love"	3:40
4.	"Closer"	3:54
5.	"Stay" (featuring Peedi Peedi)	3:51
6.	"Miss Independent"	3:53
7.	"Crazy" (featuring Jay-Z)	4:21
8.	"In the Way"	4:16
9.	"Go On Girl"	4:21
10.	"Mad"	4:14
11.	"When You're Mad"	3:42
12.	"Can We Chill"	4:24
13.	"Part of the List"	4:10
14.	"Do You" (featuring Hikaru Utada)	3:48
15.	"Because of You" (remix) (featuring Kanye West)	4:20

Ne-Yo: The Collection - Complete Edition DVD
No.	Title	Length
1.	"Stay"
2.	"So Sick"
3.	"When You're Mad"
4.	"Sexy Love"
5.	"Because of You"
6.	"Do You"
7.	"Can We Chill"
8.	"Go On Girl In the Way"
9.	"Closer"
10.	"Miss Independent"
11.	"Mad"
12.	"Part of the List"

== Charts ==
Oricon Album Chart at #4, behind local acts such as Crystal Kay, and sold 55,625 copies that week. The album also debuted at #4 on the Billboard Japan Hot 100 album chart. It sold another 38,943 copies the next week.

Chart (2009)	Peak position	Certification	Sales
Japan Albums Chart	4	Gold	94,568

== Release history ==
Region	Country	Date	Label
Asia	Japan	September 2, 2009	Universal Music Japan
