= Hate That I Love You =

2007 single by Rihanna featuring Ne-Yo

Single by Rihanna featuring Ne-Yo

from the album Good Girl Gone Bad
- Released: August 21, 2007
- Recorded: 2007
- Studio: Battery Studios (New York City); Westlake Recording Studios (Los Angeles); Lethal Studios (Bridgetown, Barbados)
- Genre: Pop; R&B
- Length: 3:39
- Label: Def Jam; SRP
- Songwriters: Shaffer Smith; Tor Erik Hermansen; Mikkel S. Eriksen
- Producer: Stargate

Rihanna singles chronology
"Shut Up and Drive" (2007)	"Hate That I Love You" (2007)	"Don't Stop the Music" (2007)

Ne-Yo singles chronology
"Can We Chill" (2007)	"Hate That I Love You" (2007)	"Go On Girl" (2007)

Music video
- "Hate That I Love You" on YouTube

"Hate That I Love You" is a song recorded by the Barbadian singer Rihanna for her third album, Good Girl Gone Bad (2007). It features vocals by American singer and songwriter Ne-Yo, who co-wrote the song with its producers Stargate. Def Jam Recordings released the song on August 21, 2007, as the third single from Good Girl Gone Bad. A Spanglish version featuring Spanish singer David Bisbal was made available on April 28, 2008. "Hate That I Love You" is a mid-tempo pop and R&B song about the power of love, with influences of folk music. "Hate That I Love You" received generally positive reviews from critics, many of whom compared it to previous works by Ne-Yo.

The song achieved moderate success in comparison to other singles from the album, reaching the top twenty in thirteen countries. It reached number 15 on the UK Singles Chart, and number seven on the US Billboard Hot 100 chart. "Hate That I Love You" was certified platinum by the Recording Industry Association of America (RIAA) denoting shipments of over one million copies. The music video was directed by Anthony Mandler; in it, Rihanna's and Ne-Yo's characters meet their respective love interests. An edited Spanglish version of the video features scenes by Bisbal instead of Ne-Yo. Rihanna performed the song at the American Music Awards of 2007, and on Operación Triunfo respectively. "Hate That I Love You" was performed on Rihanna's four worldwide tours—Good Girl Gone Bad, Last Girl on Earth, Loud and the Diamonds World Tour.

== Background and release ==
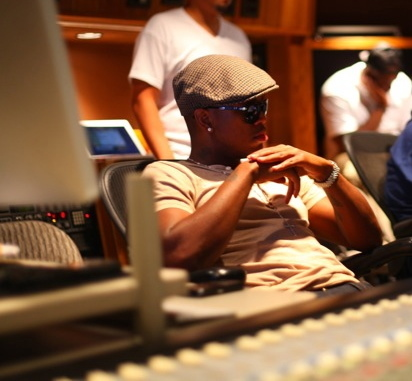
American singer and songwriter Ne-Yo co-wrote and provided vocals on "Hate That I Love You".

In early 2007, Rihanna began to work with songwriters and producers on a follow-up album to A Girl like Me. She spent the week of the Grammy Awards writing with Def Jam labelmate Ne-Yo, who gave her vocal lessons. They wrote and sang "Hate That I Love You", which was co-written and produced by Norwegian duo Stargate. "Hate That I Love You" was recorded at the Battery Studios in New York City, Westlake Recording Studios in Los Angeles and Lethal Studios in Bridgetown. Phil Tan mixed it, and Ne-Yo provided vocal production. Ne-Yo told American magazine Vibe:

When people tell me that my song-writing style seems like it could have come from the '60s, '70s, or early '80s, I take that as a compliment. Back in the day, people paid more attention to the poetics of the love song. Today [in songs] there is usually more sexual element than a romantic one. The best way to express an emotion like love is through storytelling. It makes it more 'I can relate to this character in this song, because I've been through something similar.' You hear that kind of storytelling in the song that I wrote for Rihanna called 'Hate That I Love You'.

"Hate That I Love You" was released as the third single from Good Girl Gone Bad. Def Jam Recordings serviced it to contemporary hit, rhythmic and urban radio stations in the United States on August 21, 2007. A seven-minute-long K-Klassic remix of the song was released digitally on October 22, 2007, in more than twenty countries. On October 29, 2007, a two-track extended play (EP), featuring the album version of "Hate That I Love You" and the K-Klassic remix, was released on iTunes. In November 2007, "Hate That I Love You" was released as a CD and Maxi single in Germany. The CD single includes the album version of "Hate That I Love You" and the K-Klassic remix, while the maxi single also includes the instrumental version and the music video. In late 2007, a Spanglish version titled "Hate That I Love You (Odio Amarte)" with vocals by singer David Bisbal leaked. It was released via iTunes in Argentina, Brazil, and Spain. This version is included on David Bisbal's 2007 live album Premonición Live. Cantonese and Mandarin versions of the song, featuring Hong Kong singer Hins Cheung, were included in Asian releases of Good Girl Gone Bad: Reloaded (2008).

== Composition ==
"Hate That I Love You"
A 24-second sample of the chorus of "Hate That I Love You" where Rihanna sings over piano, strummed guitars, and 4/4 beats.

"Hate That I Love You" is a midtempo pop and R&B song with folk influences that runs for 3 minutes and 39 seconds. According to the digital sheet music published by Sony/ATV Music Publishing at Musicnotes.com, it is written in the key of A-flat major and Rihanna's vocal range spans nearly two octave and a half from F_{3} to B♭_{5}. Sal Cinquemani from Slant Magazine wrote that "Hate That I Love You" maximizes Rihanna's vocal range. The song uses piano, strummed guitars and 4/4 beats, combined with Rihanna and Ne-Yo's vocals, following the D♭_{2}-E♭_{2}-E♭_{7}-B♭_{7} chord progression.

Critics compared "Hate That I Love You" to previous works by Ne-Yo. Nick Levine from Digital Spy called the song a "second cousin" of Ne-Yo's singles "Sexy Love" and "Because of You". Regarding the lyrics, Rihanna said, "When you're in love with someone, even though they keep hurting you, you're so naive and you love them so much that you put all the negative behind even though you keep getting hurt."

== Critical reception ==
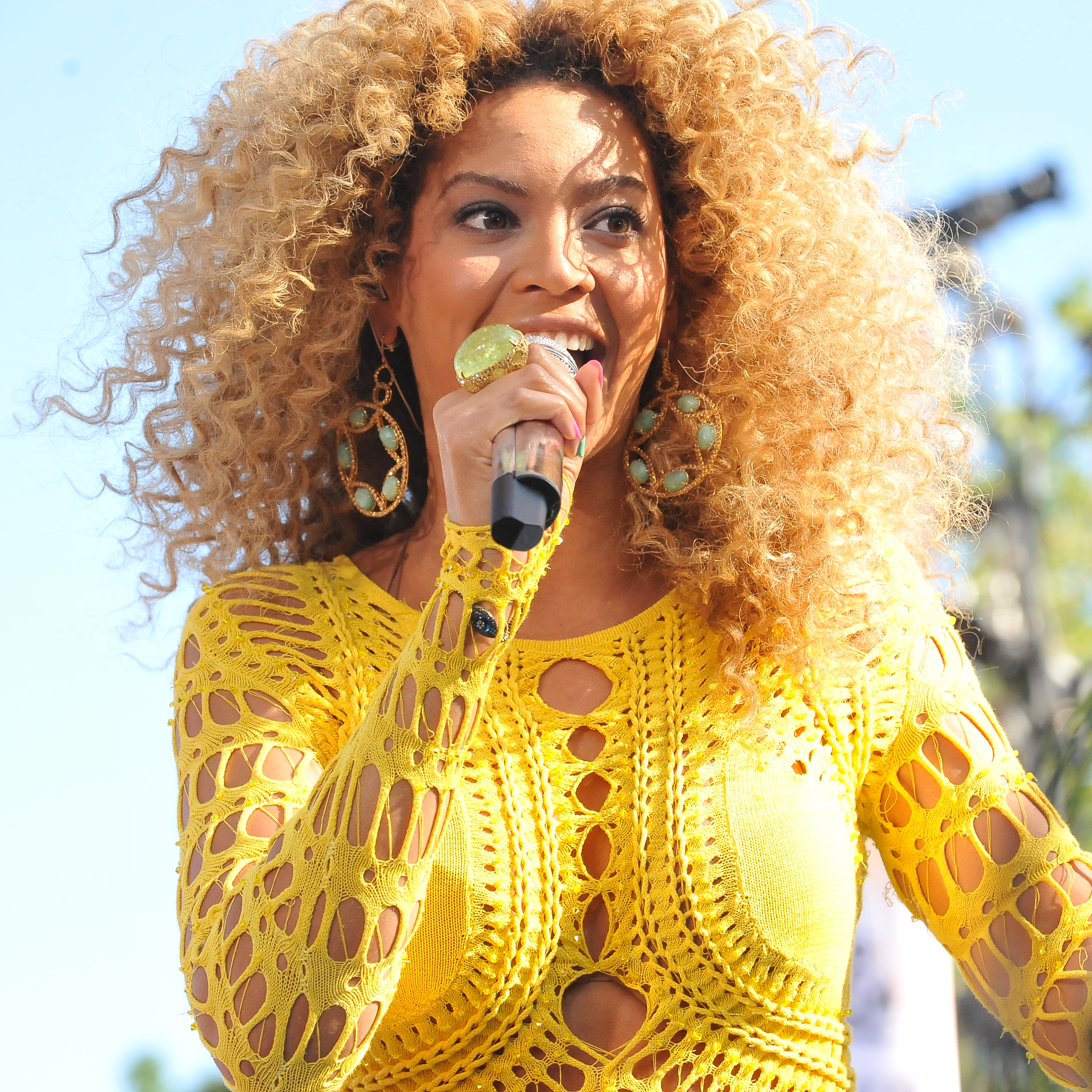
"Hate That I Love You"'s composition drew comparisons to Beyoncé's (pictured) "Irreplaceable".

"Hate That I Love You" received generally positive reviews from critics. Taila Kraines from BBC Music called it a gorgeously simple modern duet. A reviewer from The New York Times called the duet breezy. Quentin B. Huff of PopMatters was unconvinced that "Hate That I Love You" is a full-fledged ballad, but praised its catchy and smooth composition. Critics compared "Hate That I Love You"'s composition to Beyoncé's "Irreplaceable". Jackie Hayden from Hot Press called "Hate That I Love You" "the prettier twin of 'Irreplaceable'". Sal Cinquemani from Slant Magazine criticized the song, and called it a lazy carbon copy of "Irreplaceable" and Ne-Yo's "So Sick". Sarah McIntyre of RTÉ.ie concluded that the single "brings mournful acoustic guitar strumming, embarrassing harmonising and trite lyrics to a dreary whole."

In a review of Good Girl Gone Bad, Norman Mayers from Prefix Magazine wrote that the songs which were written by Ne-Yo "don't necessarily gel with the more club-oriented material on the album." Digital Spy's Nick Levine called the single a "folky, midtempo R'n'B mush-fest", and said that, "The whole affair is smoother than Lulu's forehead in the new Morrisons [UK supermarket chain] ad, but it's almost criminal that Rihanna's releasing this when 'Breakin' Dishes' and 'Don't Stop The Music', a couple of flat-out floorfillers, are still stuck on her album." The song received two nominations at the 50th Grammy Awards held at the Staples Center in Los Angeles, California, including for Best R&B Performance by a Duo or Group with Vocal and Best R&B Song. However, it lost to "Disrespectful" (Funk This, 2007) by Chaka Khan featuring Mary J. Blige and "No One" (As I Am, 2007) by Alicia Keys respectively.

== Chart performance ==
"Hate That I Love You" debuted at number 98 on the US Billboard Hot 100 for the issue dated September 15, 2007. After eight weeks on the chart, the song reached number nine and stayed on the position for five non-consecutive weeks, before peaking at number seven on December 22, 2007, making it Rihanna's fifth top-ten single on this chart. The song stayed on the chart for total of 26 weeks, becoming Rihanna's sixth longest-running single on the US Billboard Hot 100, behind "Needed Me" (43 weeks), "We Found Love" (41 weeks), "Love on the Brain" (31 weeks), "Don't Stop the Music" (30 weeks) and "Umbrella" (27 weeks). "Hate That I Love You" also peaked at number three on the US Pop Songs chart and became Rihanna's fourth top-five single there. It also peaked at number 20 on the US Hot R&B/Hip-Hop Songs. The song was certified platinum by the Recording Industry Association of America (RIAA) on August 8, 2008, having sold more than one million downloads, but was less successful in Canada where it peaked at number 17 and stayed on the chart for 23 weeks.

The song debuted on the Australian Singles Chart at number 48 on November 25, 2007. After three weeks on the chart, it reached number 14, where it stayed for one week. It was certified gold by the Australian Recording Industry Association (ARIA) denoting shipments of 35,000. Worldwide, the song's highest chart peak was on the New Zealand Singles Chart, where it reached number six. "Hate That I Love You" was certified 2× platinum by the Recording Industry Association of New Zealand (RIANZ) for selling more than 60,000 digital copies.

"Hate That I Love You" debuted at number 57 on the UK Singles Chart on October 20, 2007, where it peaked at number 15 on November 24, 2007, after six weeks on the chart. More than 150,000 copies of the song have been sold in the UK. "Hate That I Love You" reached number 13 in Ireland. In mainland Europe, the song achieved moderate success, reaching the top thirty in ten countries. The single was most successful in Sweden, where it reached number 10 on the singles chart, and stayed at that position for two consecutive weeks. The song entered and peaked at number 16 on the French Singles Chart on January 12, 2008. It stayed at the peak position for two consecutive weeks and spent 25 weeks on the chart. In Spain, the Spanglish version of "Hate That I Love You" charted on the Spanish Singles Chart. It entered the chart at number 39 on January 4, 2009. The following week, it reached its peak of 37, becoming Rihanna's fourth top-fifty single on that chart. It was certified triple platinum by the Productores de Música de España (PROMUSICAE) for selling more than 120,000 copies.

== Music video ==
The music video for "Hate That I Love You" was filmed in Los Angeles, California and directed by Anthony Mandler, who also directed the videos for Rihanna's singles "Unfaithful" and "Shut Up and Drive". Photographs of the production showing Rihanna wearing a cream bra and gray skirt were leaked on the same day. The video premiered on September 24, 2007, and was digitally released September 27, 2007, on iTunes.

The video's opening scene shows the sun rising and Rihanna waking up. Meanwhile, Ne-Yo walks along a street, wearing a hat that obscures most of his face. Rihanna is in her room; she is bored and wondering which clothes to wear, and she finds a gold necklace. As the song starts, Rihanna lies in bed and sings, while Ne-Yo continues walking along the street, approaches the hotel, and cautiously looks around before entering it. Meanwhile, Rihanna dresses, leaves the room, and walks through the hallway of the hotel. Ne-Yo goes in an elevator to the floor of Rihanna's room. As Rihanna waits near the elevator, it opens. Ne-Yo and Rihanna meet and smile at each other as Rihanna enters the elevator and Ne-Yo exits. It is then revealed that Rihanna and Ne-Yo are not singing about each other, but different people. As the video progresses, Rihanna is downstairs, chanting the lyrics of the song, and Ne-Yo is in a hallway. He knocks on a door, which his girlfriend opens, and he enters the room. Rihanna simultaneously climbs into her lover's car, and they smile at each other. The video ends with the previous scenes showing Rihanna leaving her hotel room. A reviewer from MTV UK commented, "After 'Shut Up and Drive' the 19 year old is going even raunchier for this vid- writhing around on a bed in her underwear and pearls."

== Live performances ==
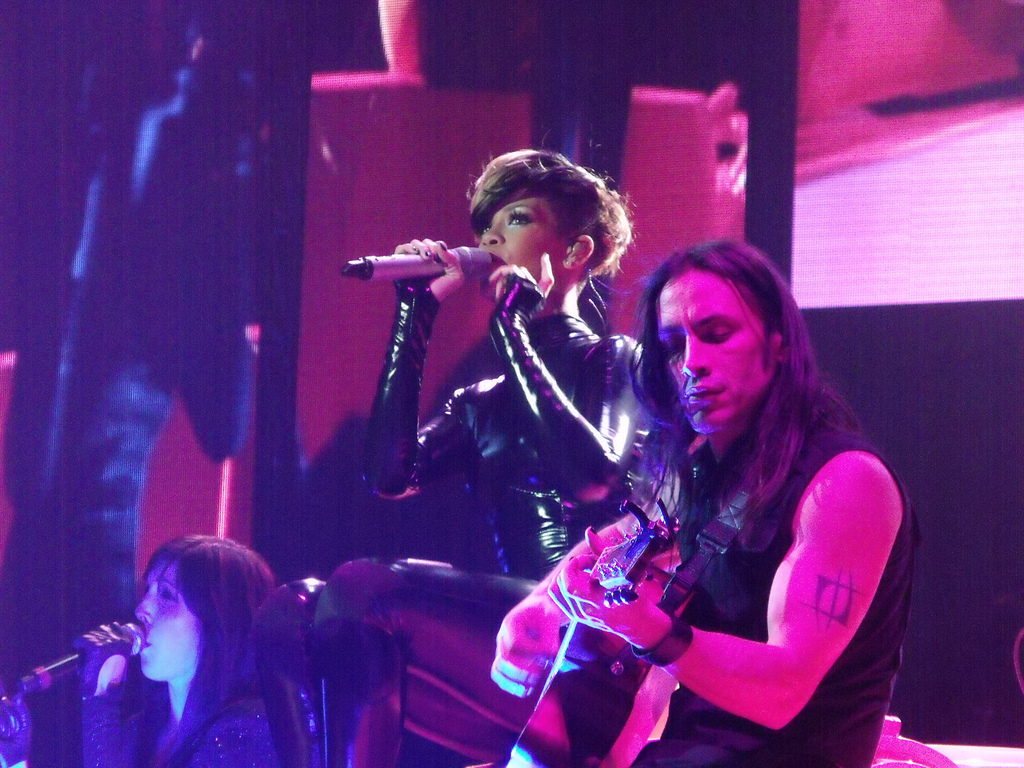
Rihanna performing "Hate That I Love You" on her Last Girl on Earth Tour (2010–11)

Rihanna occasionally performed "Hate That I Love You" at award ceremonies and concert tours. On November 18, 2007, Rihanna performed a medley consisting of "Umbrella" and "Hate That I Love You" at the American Music Awards of 2007, held at the Nokia Theater in Los Angeles, California. For the performance of "Hate That I Love You", Ne-Yo accompanied her on the stage. During the ceremony, Rihanna also won the award for Favorite Soul/R&B Female Artist. In late 2007, Rihanna also embarked on her first worldwide concert tour, the Good Girl Gone Bad Tour (2007–09). "Hate That I Love You" was the eleventh song on the set list for the tour. Her performance in Manchester was released in the UK through iTunes and is featured on the Good Girl Gone Bad Live DVD. In 2008, Rihanna performed the Spanglish version of the song with David Bisbal, at the sixth series of the Spanish talent show, Operación Triunfo.

In 2010, Rihanna embarked on her second worldwide tour, Last Girl on Earth Tour (2010–11), and "Hate That I Love You" was included on the set list. Sarah Rodman from Boston Globe praised Rihanna's performance of the song, and wrote that "Rihanna breezed through a bit of Eminem's 'Love the Way You Lie' and her own 'Hate That I Love You'." Rihanna performed the single at the 75th anniversary ceremony of Shakhtar Donetsk football team at the Donbas Arena in Ukraine on May 16, 2011. Rihanna also performed the song on her third worldwide concert tour, titled the Loud Tour (2011), in which "Hate That I Love You" was the fourteenth track on the set list. Rihanna performed the song in a medley with her ballads "Unfaithful" and "California King Bed", while wearing a long yellow gown. Rihanna also performed the song in the ballad section of her Diamonds World Tour.

== Track listings ==
- CD single
1. "Hate That I Love You" (featuring Ne-Yo) – 3:39
2. "Hate That I Love You" (K-Klassic remix) – 7:41
- Maxi-single
1. "Hate That I Love You" (featuring Ne-Yo) – 3:39
2. "Hate That I Love You" (K-Klassic remix) – 7:41
3. "Hate That I Love You" (instrumental) – 3:39
4. "Hate That I Love You" (music video) – 4:58
- Digital remix
1. "Hate That I Love You" (K-Klassic remix) – 7:41
- Digital download (Spanglish version)
1. "Hate That I Love You" (featuring David Bisbal) – 3:41

== Credits and personnel ==
Credits are adapted from the liner notes of Good Girl Gone Bad, Def Jam Recordings, SRP Records.

Recording

- Recorded at the Battery Studios in New York City, Westlake Recording Studios in Los Angeles and Lethal Studios in Bridgetown.

Personnel

- Songwriting – Ne-Yo, Tor Erik Hermansen, Mikkel S. Eriksen
- Production – Stargate
- Recording – Al Hemberger, Mike Tocci, Mikkel S. Eriksen
- Mixing – Phil Tan
- Mixing assistant – Josh Houghkirk
- Vocal production – Ne-Yo, Stargate
- Engineer [Assistant] – Deepu Panjwani, Phillip Ramos, Ricardo "Slick" Hinkson
- Guitar – Espen Lind
- Other Instruments – Tor Erik Hermansen, Mikkel S. Eriksen

== Charts ==
=== Weekly charts ===
Weekly chart performance
Chart (2007–2008)	Peak position
Australia (ARIA)	14
Australian Urban (ARIA)	5
Austria (Ö3 Austria Top 40)	14
Belgium (Ultratop 50 Flanders)	23
Belgium (Ultratip Bubbling Under Wallonia)	2
Canada Hot 100 (Billboard)	17
Czech Republic Airplay (ČNS IFPI)	13
Denmark (Tracklisten)	30
Europe (Eurochart Hot 100)	14
France (SNEP)	16
Germany (GfK)	11
Hungary (Rádiós Top 40)	31
Ireland (IRMA)	13
Netherlands (Dutch Top 40)	7
Netherlands (Single Top 100)	22
New Zealand (Recorded Music NZ)	6
Romania (Romanian Top 100)	11
Scottish Singles Sales (Official Charts)	20
Slovakia Airplay (ČNS IFPI)	19
Spain (Promusicae)	37
Sweden (Sverigetopplistan)	10
Switzerland (Schweizer Hitparade)	13
UK Singles (Official Charts)	15
UK Hip Hop/R&B (Official Charts)	5
US Billboard Hot 100	7
US Adult Pop Airplay (Billboard)	32
US Hot R&B/Hip-Hop Songs (Billboard)	20
US Pop Airplay (Billboard)	3
US Rhythmic Airplay (Billboard)	9

=== Year-end charts ===
2007 year-end chart performance
Chart (2007)	Position
Australian Urban (ARIA)	30
New Zealand (RIANZ)	48

2008 year-end chart performance
Chart (2008)	Position
Brazil (Crowley)	20
Canada (Canadian Hot 100)	100
Europe (Eurochart Hot 100)	61
France (SNEP)	88
Germany (Media Control GfK)	89
Netherlands (Dutch Top 40)	63
Spain (PROMUSICAE)	10
UK Singles (OCC)	88
US Billboard Hot 100	62
US Hot R&B/Hip-Hop Songs (Billboard)	89
US Mainstream Top 40 (Billboard)	34

== Certifications ==
Certifications
Region	Certification	Certified units/sales
Australia (ARIA)	4× Platinum	280,000^{‡}
Brazil (Pro-Música Brasil)	Diamond	250,000^{‡}
Brazil (Pro-Música Brasil) DMS	Platinum	60,000^{*}
Denmark (IFPI Danmark)	Gold	45,000^{‡}
Germany (BVMI)	Gold	150,000^{‡}
New Zealand (RMNZ)	2× Platinum	60,000^{‡}
Spain (Promusicae)	3× Platinum	60,000^{*}
United Kingdom (BPI)	Platinum	600,000^{‡}
United States (RIAA)	3× Platinum	3,000,000^{‡}
^{*} Sales figures based on certification alone.^{‡} Sales+streaming figures based on certification alone.

== Release history ==
Release dates
Region	Date	Format(s)	Version(s)	Label(s)	Ref.
United States	August 21, 2007	Contemporary hit radio; rhythmic contemporary radio	Original	Def Jam; Island Def Jam	
United States	August 21, 2007	Urban contemporary radio	Original	SRP; Def Jam; Island Def Jam	
Belgium	October 22, 2007	Digital download	K-Klassic remix	Universal	
Finland	October 22, 2007	Digital download	K-Klassic remix	Universal	
France	October 22, 2007	Digital download	K-Klassic remix	Universal	
Ireland	October 22, 2007	Digital download	K-Klassic remix	Universal	
Italy	October 22, 2007	Digital download	K-Klassic remix	Universal	
Luxembourg	October 22, 2007	Digital download	K-Klassic remix	Universal	
Norway	October 22, 2007	Digital download	K-Klassic remix	Universal	
Portugal	October 22, 2007	Digital download	K-Klassic remix	Universal	
Singapore	October 22, 2007	Digital download	K-Klassic remix	Universal	
Spain	October 22, 2007	Digital download	K-Klassic remix	Universal	
New Zealand	October 29, 2007	Digital download	Original; K-Klassic remix	Universal	
Austria	November 9, 2007	Digital download	K-Klassic remix	Universal	
United Kingdom	November 12, 2007	CD	Original; K-Klassic remix	Mercury	
Germany	November 16, 2007	CD	Original; K-Klassic remix	Universal	
Germany	November 16, 2007	MCD	Original; K-Klassic remix; instrumental	Universal	
Australia	November 19, 2007	CD	Original	Universal	
Sweden	January 28, 2008	Digital download	K-Klassic remix	Universal	
Spain	April 28, 2008	Digital download	Spanglish version	Universal	
