= List of Billboard 200 number-one albums of 2006 =

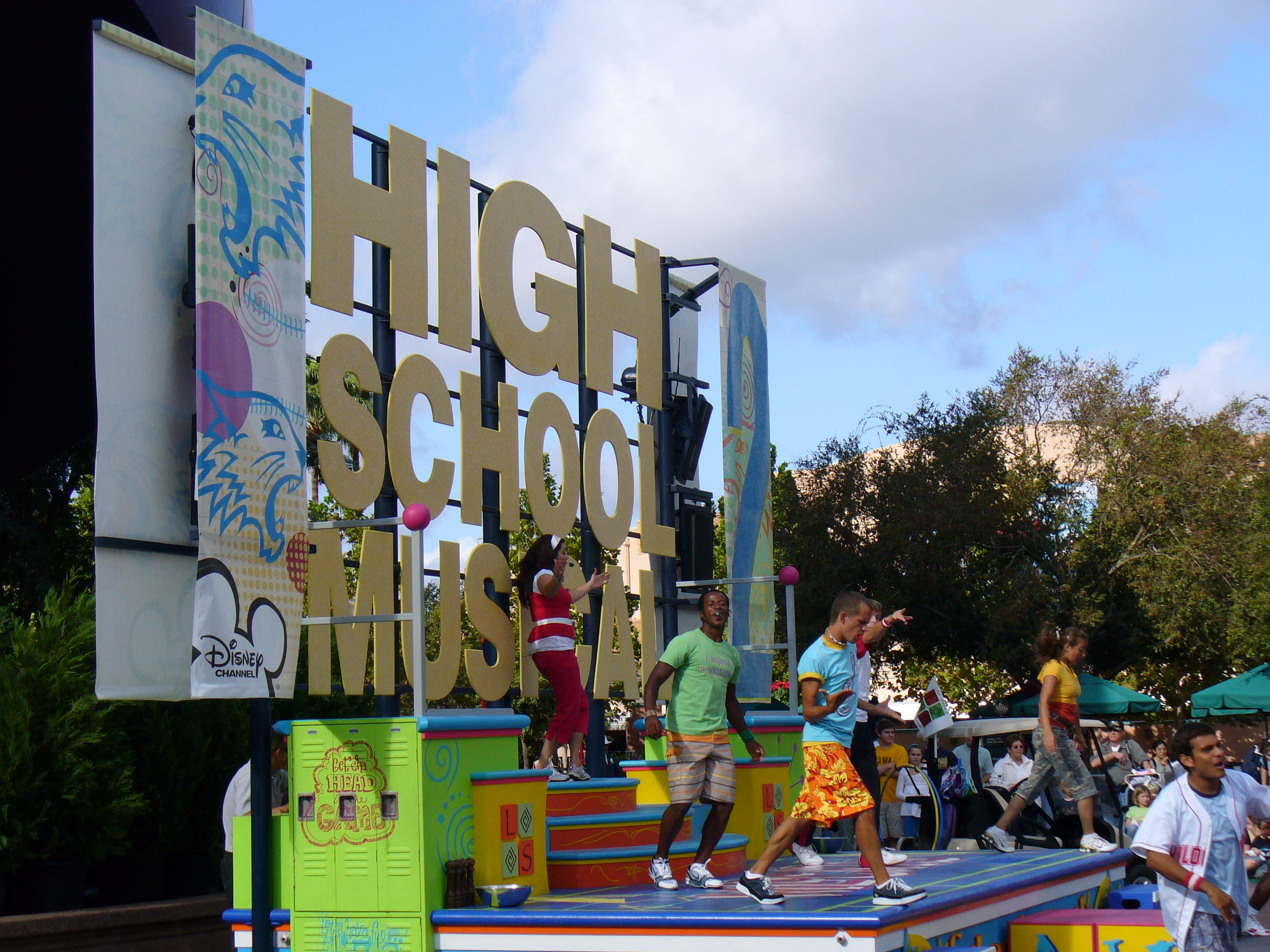
High School Musical was the best-selling album of 2006.

The highest-selling albums and EPs in the United States are ranked in the Billboard 200, published by Billboard magazine. The data are compiled by Nielsen Soundscan based on each album's weekly physical and digital sales. In 2006, 40 albums topped the chart in 52 issues of the magazine.

High School Musical, the soundtrack to the Disney Channel Original Movie of the same name, is the best-selling album of 2006, accumulating 3.7 million unit sales by the end of the year. The album spent two non-consecutive weeks at the top of Billboard 200, the first TV soundtrack to achieve since the Miami Vice soundtrack in the 1980s. Me and My Gang by Rascal Flatts is ranked second, accumulating 3.5 million total sales by the end of the year. The album sold 722,000 copies in the United States during its debut week, becoming the band's highest first week sales. Me and My Gang is also one of the longest-running of the albums, topping the chart for three consecutive weeks. Other albums with extended chart runs include Unpredictable by Jamie Foxx and the compilation album Now 22, each spent at number one for three weeks.

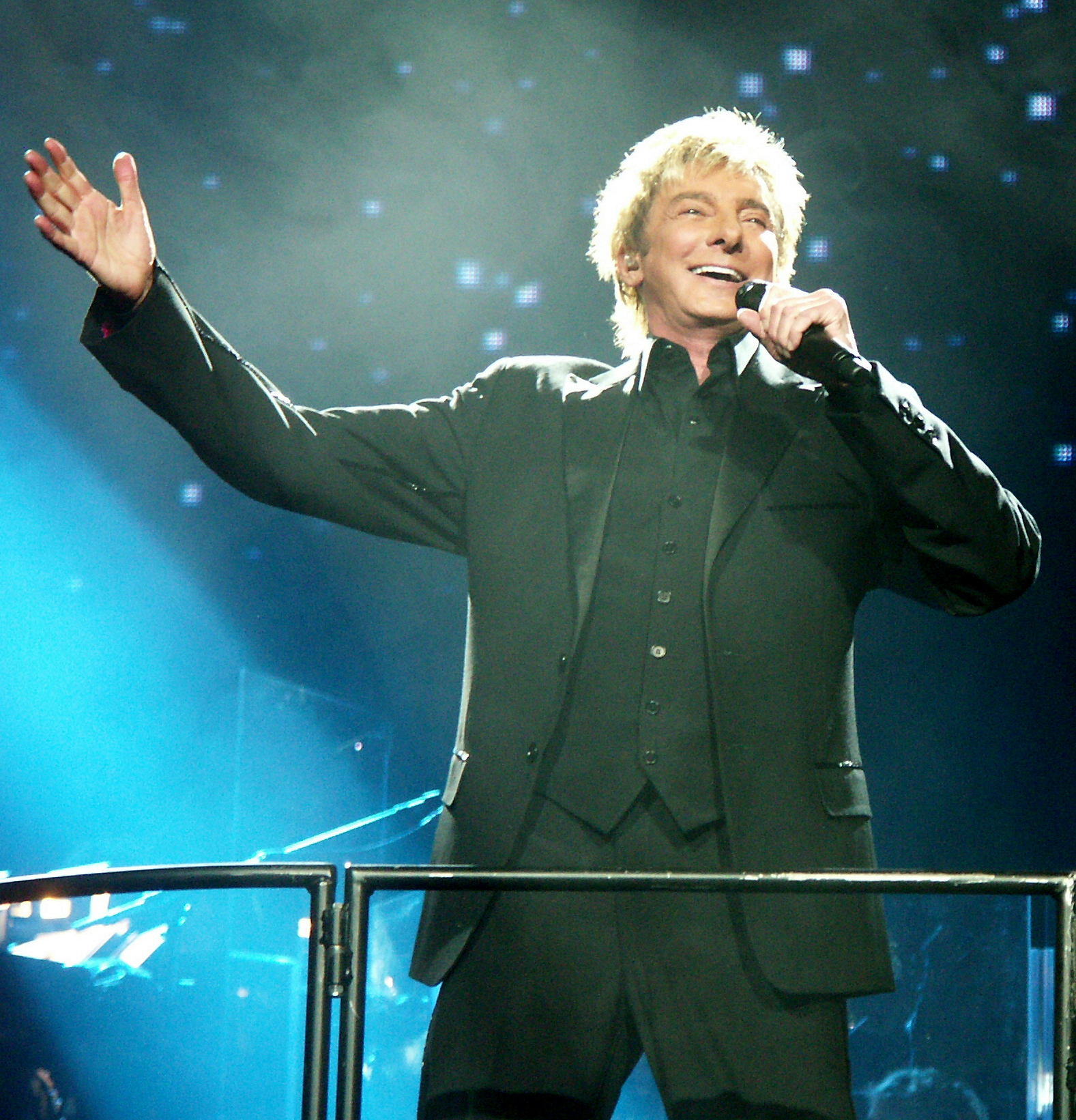
Barry Manilow scored his first number-one album in nearly 29 years with The Greatest Songs of the Fifties.

Barry Manilow's The Greatest Songs of the Fifties topped the chart on the strength of 156,000 unit sales, giving him the first chart-topper album in nearly 29 years of his career, and his best first-week sales since Billboard 200 incorporated data tracked by Nielsen SoundScan in 1991. The band Red Hot Chili Peppers earned their first number-one album, Stadium Arcadium, for the first time in its 22-year career. Stadium Arcadium, which debuted with sales of 442,000 copies, gave the band its career best sales in a week. Prince scored his first number-one album, 3121 since 1989's Batman, in a debut week. Johnny Cash's topped the chart with his posthumous record American V: A Hundred Highways, his first number one since 1969's At San Quentin. Evanescence's The Open Door gave the band its first number-one album, which became the 700th number one in the history of Billboard 200. Diddy's Press Play reached number one in November 2008, giving him his second chart topper in nine years. The album, however, sold 170,000 copies in its debut week, the lowest first-week sales figure for Diddy.

Rapper Jay-Z earned his ninth number-one album, Kingdom Come, tying the Rolling Stones for the third act with the most number-one albums in the United States. The album sold 680,000 copies domestically, giving Jay-Z his best sales in a week. Kingdom Come had the second highest debut sales, behind Justin Timberlake's FutureSex/LoveSounds, which opened at 684,000 units. The compilation series Now That's What I Call Music! produced two number ones this year: series 22 and 23. The 23rd installment gave the series its 10th number one.

Unusually, the best performing album of 2006 (Some Hearts by Carrie Underwood) did not get to number one.

== Chart history ==
Issue date	Album	Artist(s)	Sales	Ref.
January 7	The Breakthrough	Mary J. Blige	727,000	
January 14	Unpredictable	Jamie Foxx	200,000	
January 21	Unpredictable	Jamie Foxx	131,000	
January 28	The Breakthrough	Mary J. Blige	118,000	
February 4	Unpredictable	Jamie Foxx	97,200	
February 11	Ancora	Il Divo	156,000	
February 18	The Greatest Songs of the Fifties	Barry Manilow	156,000	
February 25	Sing-A-Longs and Lullabies for the Film Curious George	Jack Johnson & Friends / Soundtrack	163,000	
March 4	Ghetto Classics	Jaheim	152,000	
March 11	High School Musical	Soundtrack	101,000	
March 18	In My Own Words	Ne-Yo	301,000	
March 25	Reality Check	Juvenile	174,000	
April 1	High School Musical	Soundtrack	142,000	
April 8	3121	Prince	183,000	
April 15	King	T.I.	522,000	
April 22	Me and My Gang	Rascal Flatts	722,000	
April 29	Me and My Gang	Rascal Flatts	345,000	
May 6	Me and My Gang	Rascal Flatts	143,000	
May 13	IV	Godsmack	211,000	
May 20	10,000 Days	Tool	564,000	
May 27	Stadium Arcadium	Red Hot Chili Peppers	442,000	
June 3	Stadium Arcadium	Red Hot Chili Peppers	157,000	
June 10	Taking the Long Way	Dixie Chicks	526,000	
June 17	Taking the Long Way	Dixie Chicks	271,000	
June 24	Decemberunderground	AFI	182,000	
July 1	The Big Bang	Busta Rhymes	209,000	
July 8	Loose	Nelly Furtado	219,000	
July 15	Testimony: Vol. 1, Life & Relationship	India.Arie	161,000	
July 22	American V: A Hundred Highways	Johnny Cash	88,000	
July 29	Now 22	Various Artists	398,000	
August 5	Now 22	Various Artists	207,000	
August 12	LeToya	LeToya	165,000	
August 19	Now 22	Various Artists	127,000	
August 26	Port of Miami	Rick Ross	187,000	
September 2	Back to Basics	Christina Aguilera	346,000	
September 9	Danity Kane	Danity Kane	234,000	
September 16	Modern Times	Bob Dylan	192,000	
September 23	B'Day	Beyoncé	541,000	
September 30	FutureSex/LoveSounds	Justin Timberlake	684,000	
October 7	FutureSex/LoveSounds	Justin Timberlake	217,000	
October 14	Release Therapy	Ludacris	309,000	
October 21	The Open Door	Evanescence	447,000	
October 28	Still the Same… Great Rock Classics of Our Time	Rod Stewart	184,000	
November 4	Press Play	P. Diddy	170,000	
November 11	Hannah Montana	Soundtrack	281,000	
November 18	Hannah Montana	Soundtrack	203,000	
November 25	Now 23	Various Artists	337,000	
December 2	Doctor's Advocate	The Game	358,000	
December 9	Kingdom Come	Jay-Z	680,000	
December 16	Light Grenades	Incubus	165,000	
December 23	Ciara: The Evolution	Ciara	338,000	
December 30	The Inspiration	Young Jeezy	352,000	

== See also ==
- 2006 in music
