= Do You (Ne-Yo song) =

Single by Ne-Yo

from the album Because of You
- Released: July 31, 2007
- Length: 3:48
- Label: Def Jam
- Songwriters: Shaffer Smith; Melvin Sparkman; Marcus Allen
- Producer: The Heavyweights

Ne-Yo singles chronology
"Because of You" (2007)	"Do You" (2007)	"Can We Chill" (2007)

Utada singles chronology
"Beautiful World" (2007)	"Do You" (2007)	"Stay Gold" (2008)

"Do You" is a 2007 single by American singer-songwriter Ne-Yo. It is about Ne-Yo questioning his ex-girlfriend if she ever thinks about him anymore. It is the second single from his second album, Because of You. The single was officially released to radio the week of June 12, 2007. In an interview with BET, Ne-Yo said that "Do You" is the second part to his song "So Sick" from his debut album, In My Own Words.

"Do You" was released on July 30 in the UK as a download only single, despite receiving more video play than follow-up single "Can We Chill" (which received a physical release), resulting in a lower chart position of number 100 there, his lowest charting single.

== Music video ==
The video was directed by Melina Matsoukas. It begins with Ne-Yo writing a letter to his ex, asking if she remembers him. It is seemingly difficult, as he crumples up a piece of paper and throws them away. The video cuts to him arguing with his girlfriend, who then leaves the car. The girlfriend later moves on, gets engaged, and births a baby girl. She's then shown on a couch kissing her new boyfriend and lying on his lap, at the same time distant. Ne-Yo then remembers a memory where he is kissing her on the same couch. He then drives and stops at a pay phone and calls his ex to come to the pay phone. But by the time she arrives, he has already left. At the end she imagines herself reuniting with Ne-Yo, picturing them kissing, hugging, and caressing. Ne-Yo premiered "Do You" on BET's Access Granted on May 23, 2007.

== Remixes ==
Two duet remixes of the song have been released, both versions featuring the non-male singer singing the second verse with different lyrics: one with fellow American R&B singer Mary J. Blige and the other with Japanese American pop singer Hikaru Utada. Utada's version was released digitally in Japan on November 21, 2007, as their 7th English single (their 27th single overall). The version with Utada was included on the Ne-Yo: The Collection Japanese compilation.

== Track listings ==
Japanese single
No.	Title	Writer(s)	Producer(s)	Length
1.	"Do You" (with Hikaru Utada)	Smith; Marcus Allen; Melvin Sparkman	The Heavyweights; Ne-Yo^{[a]}	3:48

Notes

- ^{^[a]} signifies a co-producer

== Charts ==
=== Weekly charts ===
Weekly chart performance for "Do You"
Chart (2007)	Peak Position
Hungary (Editors' Choice Top 40)	31
Japan RIAJ Reco-kyō ringtones Top 100	35
UK Singles (Official Charts)	100
US Billboard Hot 100	26
US Hot R&B/Hip-Hop Songs (Billboard)	3
US Rhythmic Airplay (Billboard)	24

=== Year-end charts ===
Year-end chart performance for "Do You"
Chart (2007)	Position
US Hot R&B/Hip-Hop Songs (Billboard)	17
