= Now That's What I Call Music! 22 =

Now That's What I Call Music! 22 may refer to at least two different "Now That's What I Call Music!"-series albums, including:

- Now That's What I Call Music! 22 (U.K. series), released in 1992
- Now That's What I Call Music! 22 (U.S. series), released in 2006

== See also ==
- Now That's What I Call Music! discography
