= Now That's What I Call Music! 23 =

Now That's What I Call Music! 23 refers to at least two different Now That's What I Call Music! series albums.

- Now That's What I Call Music! 23 (UK series), released in November 1992
- Now That's What I Call Music! 23 (U.S. series), released on November 7, 2006
