= List of Billboard 200 number-one albums of 2007 =

The highest-selling albums and EPs in the United States are ranked in the Billboard 200, published by Billboard magazine. The data are compiled by Nielsen Soundscan based on each album's weekly physical and digital sales. In 2007, there were 37 albums that reached peak position, in 52 issues of the magazine.

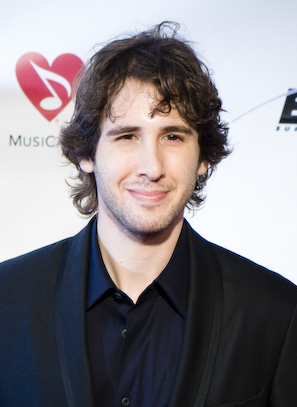
American singer-songwriter Josh Groban's Noël is the best-selling and the longest-running album of 2007, topping the chart for four consecutive weeks.

Noël, a Christmas album by American singer-songwriter Josh Groban, was the longest-running album of 2007, topping the chart for four consecutive weeks in December. Its four-week consecutive run gained Noël the credit as the first Christmas album to have achieved the feat in the chart's 51-year history. Following Groban's appearance at The Oprah Winfrey Show, sales of the album logged at 405,000, fueling the album to peak at number one and becoming Groban's best sales week ever. Noël is the only Christmas-themed record to have topped the Billboard 200 since American saxophonist Kenny G's 1994 Miracles: The Holiday Album. Noël had accumulated sales of nearly 2.8 million copies by the end of the year, becoming the best-selling album of 2007.

Canadian singer Avril Lavigne scored her second number-one album The Best Damn Thing. High School Musical 2, the soundtrack to the Disney Channel film of the same name, spent four straight weeks at the top spot. The soundtrack's first-week sale of 615,000 copies made it one of the albums with biggest debut figures of 2007. The soundtrack sold over 2.7 million units in 2008, becoming the second-best-selling album. High School Musical 2 is one of the two soundtrack albums to have reached number one on the chart, the other being Dreamgirls: Music from the Motion Picture. Linkin Park's Minutes To Midnight becomes the band's third number-one album. The album sells over 620,000 copies in its first week, becoming the third highest first week album sales for 2007. The album eventually sells over 2 million copies during the year, becoming the seventh best-selling album of the year. American singer Alicia Keys' As I Am also topped the chart for four weeks, although they were non-consecutive. It debuted on the Billboard 200 for selling 742,000 copies, the highest figure achieved for a solo female artist since Norah Jones' Feels Like Home moved one million copies in 2004.

Rapper Kanye West's Graduation took the distinction as the album with the highest sales in a week, netting over 957,000 units. It is the best sales week by any album since rapper 50 Cent's The Massacre opened with over 1.1 million copies in March 2005. Rock band The Eagles landed atop the chart with Long Road out of Eden, which sold 711,000 copies, the band's first studio album in 30 years. Sold through retailers Wal-Mart, Sam's Club and the band's web site, it marked the first time Billboard magazine allowed exclusive albums to appear on the Billboard 200. Rapper Jay-Z produced his 10th number-one album, American Gangster, placing him second, tying with Elvis Presley, in the acts with the most number-one albums in the history of Billboard 200, only behind band the Beatles who had 19.

== Chart history ==
Key
†	Indicates best performing album of 2007

Issue date	Album	Artist(s)	Sales	Ref.
January 6	Hip Hop Is Dead	Nas	355,000	
January 13	21	Omarion	119,000	|
January 20	Dreamgirls	Soundtrack	66,000	
January 27	Dreamgirls	Soundtrack	60,000	
February 3	Daughtry	Daughtry	65,000	
February 10	Late Night Special	Pretty Ricky	132,000	
February 17	Not Too Late	Norah Jones	405,000	
February 24	Infinity on High	Fall Out Boy	260,000	
March 3	Not Too Late	Norah Jones	211,000	
March 10	Not Too Late	Norah Jones	100,000	
March 17	Daughtry	Daughtry	90,000	
March 24	Greatest Hits	The Notorious B.I.G.	99,000	
March 31	Luvanmusiq	Musiq Soulchild	149,000	
April 7	We Were Dead Before the Ship Even Sank	Modest Mouse	129,000	
April 14	Let It Go	Tim McGraw	325,000	
April 21	Now 24	Various Artists	213,000	
April 28	Now 24	Various Artists	89,000	
May 5	The Best Damn Thing	Avril Lavigne	286,000	
May 12	The Best Damn Thing	Avril Lavigne	122,000	
May 19	Because of You	Ne-Yo	251,000	
May 26	Call Me Irresponsible	Michael Bublé	145,000	
June 2	Minutes to Midnight	Linkin Park	623,000	
June 9	It Won't Be Soon Before Long	Maroon 5	429,000	
June 16	Double Up	R. Kelly	386,000	
June 23	Epiphany	T-Pain	171,000	
June 30	Big Dog Daddy	Toby Keith	204,000	
July 7	Lost Highway	Bon Jovi	292,000	
July 14	Hannah Montana 2: Meet Miley Cyrus	Miley Cyrus / Soundtrack	326,000	
July 21	T.I. vs. T.I.P.	T.I.	468,000	
July 28	T.I. vs. T.I.P.	T.I.	175,000	
August 4	Now 25	Various Artists	223,000	
August 11	Now 25	Various Artists	149,000	
August 18	Finding Forever	Common	155,000	
August 25	UGK (Underground Kingz)	UGK	160,000	
September 1	High School Musical 2	Soundtrack	615,000	
September 8	High School Musical 2	Soundtrack	367,000	
September 15	High School Musical 2	Soundtrack	210,000	
September 22	High School Musical 2	Soundtrack	165,000	
September 29	Graduation	Kanye West	957,000	
October 6	Reba: Duets	Reba McEntire	301,000	
October 13	Still Feels Good	Rascal Flatts	547,000	
October 20	Magic	Bruce Springsteen	335,000	
October 27	Rock N Roll Jesus	Kid Rock	170,000	
November 3	Magic	Bruce Springsteen	77,000	
November 10	Carnival Ride	Carrie Underwood	527,000	
November 17	Long Road Out of Eden	Eagles	711,000	
November 24	American Gangster	Jay-Z	425,000	
December 1	As I Am	Alicia Keys	742,000	
December 8	Noël †	Josh Groban	405,000	
December 15	Noël †	Josh Groban	539,000	
December 22	Noël †	Josh Groban	581,000	
December 29	Noël †	Josh Groban	669,000	

== See also ==
- 2007 in music
- Lists of Billboard 200 number-one albums
