= Now That's What I Call Music! 24 =

Now That's What I Call Music! 24 may refer to three different Now That's What I Call Music! series albums.

- Now That's What I Call Music! 24 (U.K. series), released on April 1, 1993
- Now That's What I Call Music! 24 (U.S. series), released on March 27, 2007
- Now That's What I Call Music 24 (N.Z. series), released on July 5, 2007
