= Because of You (Ne-Yo song) =

2007 single by Ne-Yo

Single by Ne-Yo

from the album Because of You
- Released: February 13, 2007
- Studio: Sony Music, Battery (New York City)
- Genre: R&B
- Length: 4:26 (album version); 3:46 (radio edit)
- Label: Def Jam
- Songwriters: Mikkel Storleer Eriksen; Tor Erik Hermansen; Shaffer Smith
- Producer: Stargate

Ne-Yo singles chronology
"Sexy Love" (2006)	"Because of You" (2007)	"Do You" (2007)

Music video
- "Because of You" on YouTube

"Because of You" is a song by American singer-songwriter Ne-Yo. It was written by Ne-Yo, Mikkel S. Eriksen, and Tor Erik Hermansen for his second studio album of the same name, while production was helmed by Eriksen and Hermansen under their production moniker Stargate. The song, released on February 13, 2007, served as the album's first single. "Because of You" reached number two on the US Billboard Hot 100, topped the New Zealand Singles Chart, and reached the top 10 in Ireland, Japan, and the United Kingdom.

== Song information ==
Four other versions of the song have surfaced, one with an extended ending, one featuring rapper AC, S-One, Michael Jackson as well as Joe Budden. The official remix features Kanye West. The beat used is somehow unique in the R&B style. The main melodic instruments include muted harpsichord and guitar, whilst the groove uses a bass/clap beat combined. The groove is heavily influenced by the disco style guitar with delay. The bass/clap beat, mixed with harpsichord, gave listeners an initial impression of the song being a remix, with which the effect is typically associated. This type of beat would later appear in Ne-Yo's 2008 hit "Closer", which uses guitar with a bass/clap beat mixed with keyboard and chorus matching the vocals. Ne-Yo has stated that the song is a continuation from the 2006 single "Sexy Love".

== Chart performance ==
"Because of You" debuted on the US Billboard Hot 100 at number 84 in March; it reached the top ten in May when it climbed from number 39 to number five in one week. The song has become his second-most successful song in the US, after his 2006 number-one hit "So Sick". By May the single had reached a peak at number two on the Billboard Hot 100 chart. It also peaked at number four in the United Kingdom, becoming Ne-Yo's only lead single from an album in that country to not reach the top spot, until "Time of Our Lives" from Non-Fiction.

== Music video ==
The song's music video, directed by Melina Matsoukas and costume designed by June Ambrose premiered on Access Granted on March 14, 2007, a sneak preview having previously been shown on BET. The actress playing the 'seductress', La'Shontae Heckard, also appears in the music video of Ne-Yo's 2007 single Do You. Throughout the video, Ne-Yo echoes dance moves popularized by Michael Jackson. Ne-Yo has also worked with Trent Dickens for the choreography. The first scene of the video features Ne-Yo turning up to a club with his girlfriend, played by Camila Alves (real life Wife of Actor Matthew McConaughey). At the club, as she invites him to dance, a girl (played by La'Shontae Heckerd) brushes past him and is shown to express a seductive look. He decides to follow her into the bathroom, and there the two share a passionate kiss. The scene ends with her leaving as he rinses his face with water in regret.

In the next scene, Ne-Yo is shown in the bedroom with his girlfriend. As she falls asleep, he receives a call from the girl he met at the club, asking him to join her as a clip of her diving in a steamy pool is shown. He leaves with shoes but no socks on, intending on slipping his feet into the pool. After he arrives, she displays seductive moves in the pool as he takes photos of her. The two are again shown sharing a kiss after he lifts her out of the pool. The following scene shows Ne-Yo in the bedroom with his girlfriend. As they embrace in bed, flashes of the girl he met replace that of his girlfriend, showing that he keeps seeing her in his mind and replays their rendezvous. Finally, Ne-Yo is shown dancing with only socks on, displaying moves that echo James Brown's classic leg shuffle slide.

== Live performances ==
The song was performed during the second intermission of the 2008 NHL All-Star Game in Atlanta. Ne-Yo was joined on the ice rink of Philips Arena by the Halftime Live marching band.

== Track listings ==
Hit 3 Pack – EP:

1. "Because of You" – 4:26
2. "So Sick" – 3:27
3. "Leaving Tonight" (featuring Jennifer Hudson) – 5:14

Remixes – EP:

1. "Because of You" (Sunfreakz radio edit) – 3:29
2. "Because of You" (Josh Harris radio edit) – 3:54
3. "Because of You" (Kriya vs. Erik Velez radio mix) – 3:54
4. "Because of You" (Sunfreakz remix) – 7:17
5. "Because of You" (Josh Harris vocal club mix) – 7:56
6. "Because of You" (Kriya vs. Erik Velez club mix) – 5:52

Remix – EP:

1. "Because of You" (remix featuring Kanye West) – 3:44

== Charts ==
=== Weekly charts ===
Weekly chart performance for "Because of You"
Chart (2007–2008)	Peak position
Australia (ARIA)	23
Australian Urban (ARIA)	6
Austria (Ö3 Austria Top 40)	64
Belgium (Ultratop 50 Flanders)	44
Belgium (Ultratip Bubbling Under Wallonia)	7
Canada Hot 100 (Billboard)	19
Czech Republic Airplay (ČNS IFPI)	27
Europe (Eurochart Hot 100)	14
Germany (GfK)	30
Hungary (Rádiós Top 40)	39
Ireland (IRMA)	9
Japan Hot 100 (Billboard)	8
Netherlands (Dutch Top 40)	12
Netherlands (Single Top 100)	24
New Zealand (Recorded Music NZ)	1
Scottish Singles Sales (Official Charts)	10
Slovakia Airplay (ČNS IFPI)	15
South Korea International Singles (Gaon)	72
Sweden (Sverigetopplistan)	24
Switzerland (Schweizer Hitparade)	51
UK Singles (Official Charts)	4
UK Hip Hop/R&B (Official Charts)	2
US Billboard Hot 100	2
US Dance Club Songs (Billboard)	6
US Dance Airplay (Billboard)	13
US Hot R&B/Hip-Hop Songs (Billboard)	7
US Pop Airplay (Billboard)	17
US Rhythmic Airplay (Billboard)	7

=== Year-end charts ===
2007 year-end chart performance for "Because of You"
Chart (2007)	Position
Australian Urban (ARIA)	27
Brazil (Crowley)	77
Netherlands (Dutch Top 40)	96
New Zealand (RIANZ)	7
UK Singles (OCC)	50
UK Urban (Music Week)	10
US Billboard Hot 100	57
US Hot R&B/Hip-Hop Songs (Billboard)	38
US Rhythmic Airplay (Billboard)	37

2009 year-end chart performance for "Because of You"
Chart (2009)	Position
Japan Adult Contemporary (Billboard)	81

== Certifications ==
Certifications for "Because of You"
Region	Certification	Certified units/sales
Brazil (Pro-Música Brasil)	2× Platinum	120,000^{‡}
Denmark (IFPI Danmark)	Platinum	90,000^{‡}
Japan (RIAJ) PC download	Gold	100,000^{*}
Japan (RIAJ) Full-length ringtone	Platinum	250,000^{*}
Japan (RIAJ) Ringtone	2× Platinum	500,000^{*}
New Zealand (RMNZ)	3× Platinum	90,000^{‡}
United Kingdom (BPI)	Platinum	600,000^{‡}
United States (RIAA)	2× Platinum	2,000,000^{‡}
^{*} Sales figures based on certification alone.^{‡} Sales+streaming figures based on certification alone.

== Release history ==
Release dates and formats for "Because of You"
Region	Date	Format	Label	Ref.
United States	February 13, 2007	Rhythmic contemporary radio	Def Jam	
United States	March 6, 2007	Contemporary hit radio	Def Jam	
United Kingdom	April 16, 2007	CD	Def Jam	
