= Now That's What I Call Christmas! 3 =

Compilation album by Various artists
- Released: October 10, 2006
- Genre: Christmas music
- Length: CD 1: 42:42; CD 2: 65:10
- Label: Strategic Marketing

Full series chronology
Now That's What I Call Music! 22 (2006)	Now That's What I Call Christmas! 3 (2006)	Now That's What I Call Music! 23 (2006)

Christmas series chronology
Now That's What I Call Christmas! 2 (2003)	Now That's What I Call Christmas! 3 (2006)	The Essential Now That's What I Call Christmas (2008)

This article describes a 2006 album in the U.S. Now! series. It should not be confused with similarly or identically-titled albums belonging to different "Now!" series. For more information, see Now That's What I Call Music! discography.

Professional ratings
Review scores
Source	Rating
AllMusic	3.5/5 stars

Now That's What I Call Christmas! 3 is a 2006 double-CD album from the hit franchise Now That's What I Call Music!, released in the US on October 10, 2006. The album has sold over a million copies in the US.

== Track listing ==
=== Disc 1 ===
No.	Title	Artist	Length
1.	"O Come All Ye Faithful"	Nat King Cole	2:19
2.	"Jingle Bells"	Frank Sinatra	2:01
3.	"Baby, It's Cold Outside"	Dean Martin	2:22
4.	"My Favorite Things"	Tony Bennett	3:16
5.	"It's the Most Wonderful Time of the Year"	Andy Williams	2:32
6.	"Silver Bells"	Bing Crosby	3:03
7.	"It's Beginning to Look a Lot Like Christmas"	Johnny Mathis	2:15
8.	"Here Comes Santa Claus (Right Down Santa Claus Lane)"	Elvis Presley	1:55
9.	"Have Yourself a Merry Little Christmas"	Judy Garland	2:43
10.	"Rudolph the Red-Nosed Reindeer"	Ella Fitzgerald	2:54
11.	"Frosty the Snowman"	Gene Autry	2:54
12.	"The Little Drummer Boy"	Peggy Lee	2:17
13.	"Santa Claus Is Comin' to Town"	Burl Ives	2:09
14.	"Winter Wonderland"	Louis Armstrong	3:00
15.	"Blue Christmas"	Johnny Cash	2:22
16.	"Jingle Bell Rock"	Brenda Lee	2:09
17.	"The Chipmunk Song (Christmas Don't Be Late)"	Alvin and the Chipmunks	2:23

=== Disc 2 ===
No.	Title	Artist	Length
1.	"You're a Mean One, Mr. Grinch"	Thurl Ravenscroft	2:57
2.	"Little Saint Nick"	The Beach Boys	2:01
3.	"Noel"	Smokey Robinson & The Miracles	2:23
4.	"Up on the Housetop"	The Jackson 5	3:13
5.	"O Holy Night"	Al Green	3:43
6.	"Christmas Time Is Here"	Dianne Reeves	3:18
7.	"Christmas Is My Favorite Time of the Year"	Kenny Rogers	2:42
8.	"Shimmy Down the Chimney (Fill Up My Stocking)"	Alison Krauss	4:24
9.	"Rockin' Around the Christmas Tree"	Cyndi Lauper	2:44
10.	"Feliz Navidad"	Celine Dion	3:40
11.	"I'll Be Home for Christmas"	Gloria Estefan	3:29
12.	"I Saw Mommy Kissing Santa Claus"	Jessica Simpson	3:06
13.	"Merry Christmas, Baby"	Christina Aguilera	5:43
14.	"Hark! The Herald Angels Sing/Gloria (In Excelsis Deo)"	Mariah Carey	3:00
15.	"Santa Baby"	Pussycat Dolls	3:00
16.	"Home"	Ne-Yo	4:25
17.	"It Just Don't Feel Like Xmas (Without You)"	Rihanna	3:49
18.	"Christmas Wish"	Stacie Orrico	3:56
19.	"12 Days of Christmas"	Relient K	3:29

== Charts ==
=== Weekly charts ===
Chart (2006–2007)	Peak position
US Billboard 200	10
US Top Holiday Albums (Billboard)	1

=== Year-end charts ===
Chart (2007)	Position
US Billboard 200	86

== Certifications ==
Region	Certification	Certified units/sales
United States (RIAA)	Platinum	1,000,000^{^}
^{^} Shipments figures based on certification alone.

== See also ==
- List of Billboard Top Holiday Albums number ones of the 2000s
