= Timothy Bloom =

American singer-songwriter

- Also known as: Keys
- Born: Timothy Bloom; El Paso, Texas, US
- Origin: Fayetteville, North Carolina
- Genres: R&B, soul, rock
- Occupations: Singer, songwriter, record producer
- Instruments: Guitar, piano, drums, bass
- Years active: 1997–present
- Labels: Beyond The Sky Music, Interscope, Capitol Records
- Website: www.timothybloom.com
- Awards: Grammy Award

Timothy Bloom is a two time Grammy Award winning American alternative soul singer-songwriter and record producer.

== Career ==
He began his career as a songwriter and producer, writing and producing Grammy Award-winning songs for both Ne-Yo ("Say it" on Because of you) and Chris Brown ("All Back" on FAME) as well as writing for Smokey Robinson ("My World", "Fallin in Love"). He was signed to Interscope via a joint deal with Polow Da Don and Timbaland. In 2010, Timothy released an EP on Interscope Records entitled "The Budding Rose" which contained the video for the single "Til the End of Time." The videos for both "'Til the End on Time" and "Possibilities" have over 4 million views on YouTube.

He decided to part ways with the major label system just a few years back to venture out independently. In 2014, Timothy released an independent self-titled album, with the debut single "Stand in the Way (of MY LOVE)," which was No. 13 on the iTunes R&B charts release week and in the Billboard top 100 R&B albums. His CD "Timothy Bloom" was released October 13, 2014. The video for the single "Stand in the Way" features an appearance by legend Herbie Hancock. He was also named VH-1 Soul You Oughta Know artist in October. “If a woman's upset, you need to get this album and play it from top to bottom," said Bloom. "Get some candles, a little incense, get some bubble bath, some hot baby oil, and just play it out. Thank me later."

In 2016, Timothy Released his EP "The Beginning" and the track Adam and Eve was featured in the Fox Television show APB.

In 2017, Timothy scored the film "Honor Up" which is executive produced by Kanye West.

== Personal life ==
Raised by two preachers, Timothy was born in Texas but reared in Fayetteville, North Carolina. As a young boy, Timothy was only allowed to listen to gospel music. He grew up on artists like the Staples singers but one day he ran away to the car, turned on the radio and the first song he heard was "Lay Lady Lay" by Bob Dylan and this influenced his decision to become a secular musician. He has a wide range of influences, including Bob Dylan, Prince, Jeff Buckley, Marvin Gaye and Jimi Hendrix. The North Carolina raised singer, songwriter and producer who plays piano, guitar, bass and drum now makes Los Angeles his home.

== Awards ==
- 2008 Grammy Award-Producer-Ne-Yo ("Say it" on Because of You)
- 2010 Grammy Award-Producer/Songwriter Chris Brown ("All Back" on FAME)
- 2015 Pepsi/Deezer Midem Accelerator Artist

== Discography ==
Song	Album	Artist	Credits	Year
Fallin'	My World: Definitive collection	Smokey Robinson	songwriter, producer	2005
Say It	Because of You	Ne-Yo	producer	2007
My World (Select Mix)	Icons: Smokey Robinson & The Miracles	Smokey Robinson & The Miracles	songwriter, producer	2009
Let's Talk About It	Becoming Barack – Evolution of a Leader Soundtrack	Timothy Bloom	songwriter, producer, performer	2009
We're a Winner	Becoming Barack – Evolution of a Leader Soundtrack	Timothy Bloom	performer	2009
Your Love	Last to Train to Paris	Diddy - Dirty Money	songwriter, performer	2010
All Back	F.A.M.E.	Chris Brown	songwriter, producer	2011
Til the End of Time ft. V. Bozeman	The Budding Rose	Timothy Bloom & V. Bozeman	songwriter, producer, performer, musician	2011
Tabitha	The Budding Rose	Timothy Bloom	songwriter, producer, performer, musician	2011
Possibilities	The Budding Rose	Timothy Bloom	songwriter, producer, performer, musician	2011
This May Be	The Budding Rose	Timothy Bloom	songwriter, producer, performer, musician	2011
Til the End of Time ft. V. Bozeman Single	EP: Til the End of Time Single	Timothy Bloom	songwriter, producer, performer, musician	2011
If This Could Be Love (DUET)	If This Could Be Love (DUET)-Single	Dionyza	songwriter, producer, performer, musician	2013
In Full Bloom interlude	Timothy Bloom	Timothy Bloom	songwriter, producer, performer, musician	2014
Wooooooo!!!	Timothy Bloom	Timothy Bloom	songwriter, producer, performer, musician	2014
Stand in My Way	Timothy Bloom	Timothy Bloom	songwriter, producer, performer, musician	2014
My Diamond	Timothy Bloom	Timothy Bloom	songwriter, producer, performer, musician	2014
A Long Time Ago	Timothy Bloom	Timothy Bloom	songwriter, producer, performer, musician	2014
Lay Down	Timothy Bloom	Timothy Bloom	songwriter, producer, performer, musician	2014
The Morning After	Timothy Bloom	Timothy Bloom	songwriter, producer, performer, musician	2014
Rivers Run Deep	Timothy Bloom	Timothy Bloom	songwriter, producer, performer, musician	2014
Your Future	Timothy Bloom	Timothy Bloom	songwriter, producer, performer, musician	2014
Underneath My Skin	Timothy Bloom	Timothy Bloom	songwriter, producer, performer, musician	2014
I Hate U	Timothy Bloom	Timothy Bloom	songwriter, producer, performer, musician	2014
Live Without Her	Timothy Bloom	Timothy Bloom	songwriter, producer, performer, musician	2014
InterAgain	Timothy Bloom	Timothy Bloom	songwriter, producer, performer, musician	2014
For Love	Timothy Bloom	Timothy Bloom	songwriter, producer, performer, musician	2014
Stand in My Way	Stand in the Way single	Timothy Bloom	songwriter, producer, performer, musician	2014
Born Again	Born Again	Bobby Church	songwriter, producer, performer, musician	2014
Hard Living	Born Again	Bobby Church	songwriter, producer, performer, musician	2014
We Came, We Saw	Born Again	Bobby Church	songwriter, producer, performer, musician	2014
I Got You	Born Again	Bobby Church	songwriter, producer, performer, musician	2014
Blood Rain	Born Again	Bobby Church	songwriter, producer, performer, musician	2014
The Enemy	Born Again	Bobby Church	songwriter, producer, performer, musician	2014
How Do You Know?	Anybody Wanna Buy a Heart?	K. Michelle	songwriter, producer, musician	2014
Dear Summer	Dear Summer Single	Tabitha	songwriter, producer	2016
The Beginning (Work It Out)	The Beginning	Timothy Bloom	songwriter, producer, performer, musician	2016
Adam And Eve	The Beginning	Timothy Bloom	songwriter, producer, performer, musician	2016
Me and Myself ft. Maurice "Mobetta" Brown	The Beginning	Timothy Bloom	songwriter, producer, performer, musician	2016
Sweet Angel ft. Frédéric Yonnet	The Beginning	Timothy Bloom	songwriter, producer, performer, musician	2016
Howl at the Moon	The Beginning	Timothy Bloom	songwriter, producer, performer, musician	2016
Nobody Does It ft. Lucy Hart	The Beginning	Timothy Bloom	songwriter, producer, performer, musician	2016
Still ft. Tallay Riley	The Beginning	Timothy Bloom	songwriter, producer, performer, musician	2016
Subway Art	Dedicated To:	Tish Hyman	songwriter, producer	2016
