= Because of You (Ne-Yo album) =

Studio album by Ne-Yo
- Released: April 25, 2007
- Studios: Battery (New York City, New York); Chalice (Los Angeles, California); D.M.L. (East Orange, New Jersey); Lethal (Bridgetown, Barbados); L. Gold (Philadelphia, Pennsylvania); Roc the Mic (New York City, New York); Sony (New York City, New York); Westlake (Los Angeles, California)
- Genre: R&B
- Length: 49:57
- Labels: Compound; Def Jam
- Producers: Timothy Bloom; Ron "Neff-U" Feemster; The Heavyweights; Eric Hudson; Knobody; Ne-Yo; Stargate; Syience; Shea Taylor

Ne-Yo chronology
In My Own Words (2006)	Because of You (2007)	Year of the Gentleman (2008)

Singles from Because of You
- 1. "Because of You" Released: February 13, 2007; 2. "Do You" Released: July 30, 2007; 3. "Can We Chill" Released: September 29, 2007; 4. "Go On Girl" Released: December 4, 2007

Because of You is the second studio album by American singer and songwriter Ne-Yo. It was released by Compound Entertainment and Def Jam Recordings on April 25, 2007, in the United States. Ne-Yo reteamed with many previous collaborators to work on the follow-up to his debut album In My Own Words (2006), involving Ron "Neff-U" Feemster, StarGate, and Shea Taylor, as well as new and upcoming musicians such as The Heavyweights, Eric Hudson, Timothy Bloom, Knobody, and Syience. Next to them, Because of You features guest vocal contributions from rapper Jay-Z on "Crazy" and fellow R&B singer Jennifer Hudson on "Leaving Tonight".

Because of You debuted at number one on the US Billboard 200 and Top R&B/Hip-Hop Albums charts, selling over 250,000 copies in its first week, and was later certified platinum by the Recording Industry Association of America (RIAA). It also reached the top ten in Canada and the United Kingdom but was commercially less successful than In My Own Words elsewhere. Released to generally positive reviews from most music critics, who complimented the album for the advancement over its predecessor, it won the Grammy Award for Best Contemporary R&B Album at the 50th Annual Grammy Awards in February 2008.

== Background ==
After years of songwriting, Ne-Yo had his major breakthrough when Mario's hit single "Let Me Love You," which he co-wrote, became a worldwide number-one hit in 2004. The success of the song led to a meeting with Def Jam executive L.A. Reid, and although not actively seeking a deal, Ne-Yo was signed by then-CEO Jay-Z after performing for the label. In My Own Words, his debut album with Def Jam, was released in February 2006 and earned him a Grammy Award nomination for Best Contemporary R&B Album. A commercial success, it debuted at number one on the US Billboard 200, selling 1.4 million copies domestcially, while also producing four singles, including the number-one hit "So Sick."

For his next album with the label, the singer reteamed with many previous collaborators from his debut album to work on new material, including Ron "Neff-U" Feemster, StarGate, and Shea Taylor. Ne-Yo also consulted new and upcoming musicians such as Eric Hudson, Timothy Bloom, Knobody, and Syience. Planned additional studio sessions with producer Timbaland failed to materialize due to their scheduling. Initially titled Know Me, the project was re-titled Because of You a month before its release, which he felt "makes the most sense. It's because of the people that inspire me to make music. Because of the love of the music. Because of the fans. Because of you, that I do what I do."

== Promotion ==
Because of You was preceded by its same-titled lead single. Issued to radios on February 13, 2007, it emerged as Ne-Yo's highest-charting single since "So Sick" (2006), becoming his first number-one hit in New Zealand, while also reaching the fop five in the United Kingdom and the United States. The up-tempo track also earned him his second consecutive Grammy Award nomination for Best Male R&B Vocal Performance. While Ne-Yo had initially hoped that "Crazy" featuring Jay Z – then titled "Call Me Crazy" – would be released as the album's second single, Def Jam decided to release the downtempo song "Do You", produced by The Heavyweights, as the follow-up to "Because of You" in September 2007. The song peaked at number 26 on the US Billboard Hot 100 and three on the Hot R&B/Hip-Hop Songs chart. "Can We Chill", and "Go On Girl" were as the album's third and fourth singles, respectively, while "Leaving Tonight" was issued as a radio single only.

== Critical reception ==
Professional ratings
Aggregate scores
Source	Rating
Metacritic	74/100
Review scores
Source	Rating
AllMusic	4/5 stars
The A.V. Club	B
Entertainment Weekly	B+
Los Angeles Times	2.5/4 stars
PopMatters	9/10
Robert Christgau	(dud)
Rolling Stone	3.5/5 stars
Slant Magazine	2/5 stars
Stylus Magazine	C+
Yahoo! Music UK	6/10 stars

At Metacritic, which assigns a normalized rating out of 100 to reviews from critics, the album received an average score of 74, which indicates "generally favorable" reviews, based on 14 critics. PopMatters's Colin McGuire found that with Because of You Ne-Yo "relishes in his disgust for a sophomore slump by fighting back with an album that leaves his first solo effort so far in the dust." He felt that the album "might end up being the best R&B album of the year." Similarly, AllMusic editor Andy Kellman noted that "the key to the album's potency and freshness is its differences from In My Own Words [...] Making it to number one on your own, writing a major hit for one of the planet's most popular entertainers, and qualifying as the heir to R. Kelly can have that effect." Simon Vozick-Levinson from Entertainment Weekly noted that "indeed, the album is an unmistakable attempt to channel Michael Jackson's early work such as Off the Wall [...] and the effort often pays off beautifully [...] Ne-Yo's lithe falsetto puts the many others who've been labeled Jackson-esque to shame."

In his review for The A.V. Club, Nathan Rabin wrote that the album "is a real sleeper that reveals considerable strengths upon repeat listens [...] Best of all, with a running time of just over 59 minutes, Because of You is largely devoid of filler, and it never threatens to wear out its welcome." Slant Magazine also compared the album's sensual ballads to Janet Jackson. Kelefa Sanneh, writer for The New York Times, found that Ne-Yo "got a silky voice and a clear knack for chronicling obsessive love and lust; maybe one day he’ll create a half-crazed R&B masterpiece. But in the meantime, Because of You is a likable little album: 12 girl-crazy songs from a boy who can stop anytime he wants. Honest." Sarah Rodman from The Boston Globe called the album a "sexy and sweet sophomore release"." She found that "although several different hands are employed, the album flows as if from one mind, with an emphasis on crafty vocal arrangements, crisp snap-and-clap percussion, and breezy keyboard work" and noted that Because of You "mostly avoids the filler problem that plagues many contemporary R&B albums. And what filler there is [...] is arranged so lusciously that it does not offend."

== Commercial performance ==
Because of You became Ne-Yo's second number-one album in the United States. It debuted atop both the US Billboard 200 and the Top R&B/Hip-Hop Albums chart in the week ending May 19, 2007, selling 251,000 copies. It was certified Gold and Platinum by the Recording Industry Association of America (RIAA) on November 12, 2007. Billboard ranked the album 13th on its Top R&B/Hip-Hop Albums year-end listing. By March 2008, Because of You has sold over 931,000 copies domestically, according to Nielsen SoundScan.

== Track listing ==
Because of You track listing
No.	Title	Writer(s)	Producer(s)	Length
1.	"Because of You"	Shaffer Smith; Tor Erik Hermansen; Mikkel S. Eriksen	Stargate; Ne-Yo^{[a]}	4:26
2.	"Crazy" (featuring Jay-Z)	Smith; Ron "Neff-U" Feemster; Shawn Carter	Feemster	4:21
3.	"Can We Chill"	Smith; Eric Hudson	Hudson; Ne-Yo^{[a]}	4:24
4.	"Do You"	Smith; Marcus Allen; Melvin Sparkman	The Heavyweights; Ne-Yo^{[a]}	3:48
5.	"Addicted"	Smith; Shea Taylor	Taylor; Ne-Yo^{[a]}	3:46
6.	"Leaving Tonight" (featuring Jennifer Hudson)	Smith; Jerome Foster; Joe Davi; Smokey Robinson; Marvin Tarplin; Pamela Moffett-Young	Knobody; Ne-Yo^{[a]}	5:15
7.	"Ain't Thinking About You"	Smith; Hudson	Hudson; Ne-Yo^{[a]}	3:41
8.	"Sex With My Ex"	Smith; Taylor	Taylor; Ne-Yo^{[a]}	3:39
9.	"Angel"	Smith; Reginald Perry	Syience; Ne-Yo^{[a]}	3:28
10.	"Make It Work"	Smith; Taylor	Taylor; Ne-Yo^{[a]}	4:09
11.	"Say It"	Smith; Timothy Bloom; Shanell Woodgett	Bloom; Ne-Yo^{[a]}	4:41
12.	"Go On Girl"	Smith; Hermansen; Eriksen; Espen Lind; Amund Bjørklund	Stargate; Ne-Yo^{[a]}	4:21

UK bonus track
No.	Title	Writer(s)	Producer(s)	Length
13.	"That's What It Does"	Smith; Taylor	Taylor; Ne-Yo^{[a]}	3:32

Japanese bonus tracks
No.	Title	Writer(s)	Producer(s)	Length
13.	"That's What It Does"	Smith; Taylor	Taylor; Ne-Yo^{[a]}	3:32
14.	"Spotlight"	Smith; Hermansen; Eriksen	Stargate; Ne-Yo^{[a]}	4:04

Notes

- ^{^[a]} signifies a co-producer
- "Leaving Tonight" contains elements of "Baby Come Close" written by Smokey Robinson, Marvin Tarplin, Pamela Moffett-Young, and performed by Smokey Robinson.

== Personnel ==
Credits adapted from album's liner notes.

- Marcus Allen – producer (track 4)
- David Barnett – viola (tracks 4, 11)
- Timothy "Keys" Bloom – producer (track 11)
- Jeff Chestek – engineer (track 4)
- Tom Coyne – mastering
- Joe Davi – guitar and bass (track 6)
- Kevin "KD" Davis – mixing (tracks 2–11)
- Andrew Dawson – engineer (track 9)
- Mikkel S. Eriksen – producer, engineer, and all instruments (tracks 1, 12)
- Ron "Neff-U” Feemstar – producer (track 2)
- Larry Gold – string arrangement and production (tracks 4, 11)
- Jaymz Hardy-Martin III – engineer (tracks 4, 11)
- Tor Erik Hermansen – producer and all instruments (tracks 1, 12)
- Ricardo "Slick" Hinkson – assistant engineer (tracks 4, 7, 10, 11)
- Bob Horn – engineer (track 2)
- Josh Houghkirk – assistant mixing engineer (tracks 1, 12)
- Eric Hudson – producer and all instruments (tracks 3, 7)
- Jennifer Hudson – vocals (track 6)
- Jay-Z – rap (track 2)
- Gloria Justen – violin (tracks 4, 11)
- Knobody – producer (track 6)
- Olga Konopelsky – violin (tracks 4, 11)
- Emma Kummrow – violin (tracks 4, 11)
- Danielle Laport – additional recording (track 10)
- Espen Lind – guitar (track 12)
- Jennie Lorenzo – cello (tracks 4, 11)
- Ne-Yo – vocals (all tracks), co–producer (tracks 1, 3–12)
- Deepu Panjwani – assistant engineer (tracks 4, 7, 10, 11)
- Syience – producer (track 9)
- Melvin Sparkman – producer (track 4)
- Brian Springer – engineer (track 9)
- Brian Sumner – engineer (track 3)
- Igor Szwec – violin (tracks 4, 11)
- Phil Tan – mixing (tracks 1, 12)
- Shea Taylor – producer and guitar (tracks 5, 8, 10), saxophone and horns (track 5)
- Michael Tocci – engineer (all tracks)
- Shane "Bermuda" Woodley – assistant mixing engineer (tracks 2–11), engineer (tracks 3, 7)

== Charts ==
=== Weekly charts ===
Weekly chart performance for Because of You
Chart (2007)	Peak position
Australian Albums (ARIA)	39
Belgian Albums (Ultratop Flanders)	59
Canadian Albums (Billboard)	8
Dutch Albums (Album Top 100)	30
French Albums (SNEP)	175
German Albums (Offizielle Top 100)	54
Irish Albums (IRMA)	34
Italian Albums (FIMI)	97
Japanese Albums (Oricon)	2
New Zealand Albums (RMNZ)	34
Scottish Albums (Official Charts)	27
Swiss Albums (Schweizer Hitparade)	49
UK Albums (Official Charts)	6
UK R&B Albums (Official Charts)	1
US Billboard 200	1
US Top R&B/Hip-Hop Albums (Billboard)	1

=== Year-end charts ===
2007 year-end chart performance for Because of You
Chart (2007)	Position
Australian Urban Albums (ARIA)	27
Japanese Albums (Oricon)	26
UK Albums (OCC)	138
US Billboard 200	53
US Top R&B/Hip-Hop Albums (Billboard)	13

2008 year-end chart performance for Because of You
Chart (2008)	Position
US Top R&B/Hip-Hop Albums (Billboard)	77

== Certifications ==
Certifications for Because of You
Region	Certification	Certified units/sales
Japan (RIAJ)	Platinum	250,000^{^}
New Zealand (RMNZ)	Platinum	15,000^{‡}
United Kingdom (BPI)	Gold	100,000^{*}
United States (RIAA)	Platinum	1,000,000^{^}
^{*} Sales figures based on certification alone.^{^} Shipments figures based on certification alone.^{‡} Sales+streaming figures based on certification alone.

== Release history ==
Table of release dates, formats, editions and record labels
Region	Date	Format	Editions	Label
Japan	April 25, 2007	CD; digital download	Standard	Def Jam; Compound
Australia	April 27, 2007	CD; digital download	Standard	Def Jam; Compound
Europe	April 27, 2007	CD; digital download	Standard	Def Jam; Compound
United Kingdom	April 30, 2007	CD; digital download	Standard	Def Jam; Compound
United States	May 1, 2007	CD; digital download	Standard	Def Jam; Compound
Canada	May 26, 2007	CD; digital download	Standard	Def Jam; Compound
Sweden	May 26, 2007	CD; digital download	Standard	Def Jam; Compound
