= Now That's What I Call Music! 23 (American series) =

Compilation album by various artists
- Released: November 7, 2006
- Length: 74:26
- Label: Sony BMG

Numbered series chronology
Now That's What I Call Music! 22 (2006)	Now That's What I Call Music! 23 (2006)	Now That's What I Call Music! 24 (2007)

Full series chronology
Now That's What I Call Christmas! 3 (2006)	Now That's What I Call Music! 23 (2006)	Now Esto Es Musica! Latino 2 (2006)

Professional ratings
Review scores
Source	Rating
Allmusic	3/5 stars
Entertainment Weekly	B

Now That's What I Call Music! 23 was released on November 7, 2006. The album is the 23rd edition of the (U.S.) Now! series. It sold over 337,000 copies in its opening week to debut at number one on the Billboard 200, becoming the tenth chart topper in the series. It also reached number three on the Top R&B/Hip-Hop Albums chart.

Now! 23 has been certified 2× Platinum and features three Billboard Hot 100 number-one hits, "London Bridge", "Promiscuous" and "SexyBack".

== Track listing ==
No.	Title	Artist	Length
1.	"London Bridge"	Fergie	3:27
2.	"Promiscuous"	Nelly Furtado featuring Timbaland	3:40
3.	"Buttons"	Pussycat Dolls featuring Snoop Dogg	3:45
4.	"SexyBack"	Justin Timberlake featuring Timbaland	4:01
5.	"Ain't No Other Man"	Christina Aguilera	3:46
6.	"Déjà Vu"	Beyoncé featuring Jay-Z	4:00
7.	"Do It to It"	Cherish featuring Sean Paul of YoungBloodZ	3:46
8.	"Bossy"	Kelis featuring Too Short	4:32
9.	"Pullin' Me Back"	Chingy featuring Tyrese	3:52
10.	"S.E.X."	Lyfe Jennings featuring LaLa Brown	3:19
11.	"Sexy Love"	Ne-Yo	3:38
12.	"Unfaithful"	Rihanna	3:46
13.	"Too Little Too Late"	JoJo	3:39
14.	"I Can't Hate You Anymore"	Nick Lachey	3:51
15.	"These Walls"	Teddy Geiger	3:43
16.	"A Public Affair"	Jessica Simpson	3:19
17.	"Here It Goes Again"	OK Go	2:43
18.	"Lips of an Angel"	Hinder	4:19
19.	"Far Away"	Nickelback	3:56
20.	"Summertime"	Kenny Chesney	3:25

== Charts ==
=== Weekly charts ===
Chart (2006)	Peak position
US Billboard 200	1
US Top R&B/Hip-Hop Albums (Billboard)	3

=== Year-end charts ===
Chart (2007)	Position
US Billboard 200	9
US Top R&B/Hip-Hop Albums (Billboard)	40
