= S-One =

- Manufacturer: SCHAFT Inc.
- Country: Japan
- Type: Humanoid
- Purpose: Recognition, Medical, Search and rescue, Technology demonstrator
- Website: http://schaft-inc.jp/

S-One is a Japanese robot made by Tokyo-based company Schaft to compete in the Robotics Challenge, a DARPA-organized competition with an aim to "discover" the most up-to-date humanoid robots.

S-One won the competition with 27 points out of 32 by completing tasks such as clearing the ground of objects and passing through debris without difficulty. The S-One lost points when it was unable to exit from a vehicle.

== Characteristics ==
S-One is 148 cm (4 feet 11 inches) high and weighs 95 kg (209 lbs).
