= Now That's What I Call Music! 22 (American series) =

Compilation album by various artists
- Released: July 11, 2006
- Length: 73:02
- Label: Sony BMG

Numbered series chronology
Now That's What I Call Music! 21 (2006)	Now That's What I Call Music! 22 (2006)	Now That's What I Call Music! 23 (2006)

Full series chronology
Now That's What I Call Music! 21 (2006)	Now That's What I Call Music! 22 (2006)	Now That's What I Call Christmas! 3 (2006)

Professional ratings
Review scores
Source	Rating
AllMusic	3/5 stars

Now That's What I Call Music! 22 is the 22nd edition of the (U.S.) Now! series. It was released on July 11, 2006. It debuted at number one on the Billboard 200 and is the ninth number-one album in the series. The album has been certified Platinum.

Now! 22 features five Billboard Hot 100 number-one hits: "SOS", "Temperature", "Ridin'", "Check on It" and "Bad Day".

== Track listing ==
No.	Title	Artist	Length
1.	"SOS"	Rihanna	3:59
2.	"Temperature"	Sean Paul	3:36
3.	"Ridin'"	Chamillionaire featuring Krayzie Bone	4:03
4.	"Check on It"	Beyoncé featuring Slim Thug and Bun B.	3:29
5.	"Yo (Excuse Me Miss)"	Chris Brown	3:48
6.	"Ms. New Booty"	Bubba Sparxxx	3:20
7.	"I'm n Luv"	T-Pain	3:45
8.	"Poppin' My Collar"	Three 6 Mafia	2:56
9.	"When You're Mad"	Ne-Yo	3:37
10.	"What's Left of Me"	Nick Lachey	4:04
11.	"Bad Day"	Daniel Powter	3:49
12.	"Over My Head (Cable Car)"	The Fray	3:55
13.	"For You I Will (Confidence)"	Teddy Geiger	3:46
14.	"Walk Away"	Kelly Clarkson	3:06
15.	"Black Horse and the Cherry Tree"	KT Tunstall	2:50
16.	"Girl Next Door"	Saving Jane	3:22
17.	"Let U Go"	Ashley Parker Angel	3:36
18.	"Move Along"	The All-American Rejects	3:58
19.	"Savin' Me"	Nickelback	3:37
20.	"Tonight I Wanna Cry"	Keith Urban	4:18

== Charts ==
=== Weekly charts ===
Chart (2006)	Peak position
US Billboard 200	1

=== Year-end charts ===
Chart (2006)	Position
US Billboard 200	25
