= Can We Chill =

Single by Ne-Yo

from the album Because of You
- Released: September 29, 2007
- Length: 4:24 (album version); 3:41 (radio edit)
- Label: Def Jam
- Songwriters: Shaffer Smith; Eric Hudson
- Producer: Eric Hudson

Ne-Yo singles chronology
| "Do You" (2007) | "Can We Chill" (2007) | "Hate That I Love You" (2007) |

"Can We Chill" is a song recorded by American singer and songwriter Ne-Yo, taken as the third single from the singer's second studio album, Because of You (2007). The song became Ne-Yo's lowest charting single in the U.S. and second lowest in the UK. In the U.S., "Can We Chill" failed to chart on the Billboard Hot 100 altogether and only peaked at #52 on the Billboard Hot R&B/Hip-Hop Songs.

In the UK, "Can We Chill" outperformed Ne-Yo's previous single, "Do You", peaking at number sixty-two on the UK Singles Chart, despite the music video receiving limited airplay before being removed from TV airplay schedules altogether. There was also confusion regarding the single's release date, with some retailers pushing the date back to the 15 October 2007, whereas the 1 October release still remained, despite airplay being limited (the video was premiered in the UK three days before the song's release).

== Music video ==
The video for "Can We Chill" premiered on 106 & Park on September 25. The video was shown as a First Look on TRL on October 3, 2007 and debuted at number eight on October 8, 2007. Antiguan-born costume designer and stylist June Ambrose worked on the music video.

The music video was shot in Santo Domingo, Dominican Republic, and shows Ne-Yo in various locations such as a cave and on a beach. He flirts with girls throughout the video until he sees a girl he likes. He follows her into the cave which eventually becomes a nightclub, which is a real cave/ night club in Santo Domingo known as "Club Los Tres Ojos". He starts dancing with various girls but ends up dancing with the girl he likes. He leans in to kiss her but instead they keep dancing.

== Track listings ==
CD single
| No. | Title | Writer(s) | Producer(s) | Length |
|---|---|---|---|---|
| 1. | "Can We Chill" | Smith; Eric Hudson | Hudson; Ne-Yo^{[a]} | 4:24 |
| 2. | "Spotlight" | Smith; Tor Erik Hermansen; Mikkel S. Eriksen | Stargate; Ne-Yo^{[a]} | 4:04 |

Maxi single
| No. | Title | Writer(s) | Producer(s) | Length |
|---|---|---|---|---|
| 1. | "Can We Chill" | Smith; Hudson | Hudson; Ne-Yo^{[a]} | 4:24 |
| 2. | "Can We Chill" (radio edit) | Smith; Hudson | Hudson; Ne-Yo^{[a]} | 3:50 |
| 3. | "Spotlight" | Smith; Hermansen; Eriksen | Stargate; Ne-Yo^{[a]} | 4:04 |

Notes

- ^{^[a]} signifies a co-producer

== Charts ==
Weekly chart performance for "Can We Chill"
| Chart (2007) | Peak Position |
|---|---|
| Scotland Singles (OCC) | 45 |
| UK Singles (OCC) | 62 |
| UK Hip Hop/R&B (OCC) | 11 |
| US Hot R&B/Hip-Hop Songs (Billboard) | 52 |
