= Now That's What I Call Music! 24 (American series) =

Compilation album by various artists
- Released: March 27, 2007
- Length: 77:29
- Label: Capitol

Numbered series chronology
| Now That's What I Call Music! 23 (2006) | Now That's What I Call Music! 24 (2007) | Now That's What I Call Music! 25 (2007) |

Full series chronology
| Now Esto Es Musica! Latino 2 (2006) | Now That's What I Call Music! 24 (2007) | Now That's What I Call Music! 25 (2007) |

Professional ratings
Review scores
| Source | Rating |
|---|---|
| Allmusic | 3.5/5 stars |

Now That's What I Call Music! 24 is a music compilation that was released on March 27, 2007. The album is the 24th edition of the Now! series in the United States

It debuted at number two on the Billboard 200, selling about 230,000 copies in its first week. It experienced the lowest selling debut week for a NOW album since 2003's Now That's What I Call Music! 13, which sold 171,000 copies in its first week. The album rose to number one in its second week, selling 213,000 copies, and remained at number one in its third week, selling about 89,000 copies. It has received a Platinum certification. It has four Billboard Hot 100 number-one hits: "Say It Right", "Irreplaceable", "My Love" and "I Wanna Love You".

== Track listing ==
| No. | Title | Artist | Length |
|---|---|---|---|
| 1. | "Fergalicious" | Fergie featuring will.i.am | 3:42 |
| 2. | "Break It Off" | Rihanna featuring Sean Paul | 3:33 |
| 3. | "Say It Right" | Nelly Furtado | 3:45 |
| 4. | "Irreplaceable" | Beyoncé | 3:45 |
| 5. | "My Love" | Justin Timberlake featuring T.I. | 4:37 |
| 6. | "I Wanna Love You" | Akon featuring Snoop Dogg | 3:56 |
| 7. | "Shortie Like Mine" | Bow Wow featuring Chris Brown & Johntá Austin | 4:27 |
| 8. | "You" | Lloyd featuring Lil Wayne | 4:29 |
| 9. | "Promise" | Ciara | 4:27 |
| 10. | "Ice Box" | Omarion | 3:59 |
| 11. | "Say Goodbye" | Chris Brown | 4:45 |
| 12. | "Put Your Records On" | Corinne Bailey Rae | 3:33 |
| 13. | "Smile" | Lily Allen | 3:14 |
| 14. | "Suddenly I See" | KT Tunstall | 3:18 |
| 15. | "Here (In Your Arms)" | Hellogoodbye | 3:37 |
| 16. | "Face Down" | The Red Jumpsuit Apparatus | 3:09 |
| 17. | "How to Save a Life" | The Fray | 3:59 |
| 18. | "If Everyone Cared" | Nickelback | 3:35 |
| 19. | "It's Not Over" | Daughtry | 3:26 |
| 20. | "It Ends Tonight" | The All-American Rejects | 4:04 |

== Charts ==
=== Weekly charts ===
| Chart (2007) | Peak position |
|---|---|
| US Billboard 200 | 1 |
| US Top R&B/Hip-Hop Albums (Billboard) | 3 |

=== Year-end charts ===
| Chart (2007) | Position |
|---|---|
| US Billboard 200 | 42 |
| US Top R&B/Hip-Hop Albums (Billboard) | 69 |

== See also ==
- List of Billboard 200 number-one albums of 2007
