= When You're Mad =

2006 single by Ne-Yo

Single by Ne-Yo

from the album In My Own Words
- B-side: "So Sick Remix"
- Released: March 6, 2006
- Studio: Compound (Los Angeles)
- Genre: R&B
- Length: 3:43
- Label: Def Jam
- Songwriters: Shaffer Smith; Shea Taylor
- Producer: Shea Taylor

Ne-Yo singles chronology
"Feels So Good" (2006)	"When You're Mad" (2006)	"Sexy Love" (2006)

Music video
- "When You're Mad" on YouTube

"When You're Mad" is a song by American singer-songwriter Ne-Yo. It was written by Ne-Yo and Shea Taylor for Ne-Yo's debut album, In My Own Words (2006), while production was overseen by Taylor. Released as the album's third single in March 2006, the song peaked at number 15 on the US Billboard Hot 100 and reached the top five on the Billboard Hot R&B/Hip-Hop Songs chart. Worldwide, "When You're Mad" charted in Australia and Canada, peaking at numbers 81 and 16, respectively.

== Composition ==
The song was recorded in the key of F♯ major (written in G major) with a tempo of 87 beats per minute. The song follows a chord progression of Bmaj9 – C♯/E♯ – F♯, and Ne-Yo's vocals span from C♯_{4} to G♯_{5}.

== Music video ==
The video features Ne-Yo and his girlfriend on a beach-like area. His girlfriend continuously shown to be angry at him, as different girls who see him are flirting with him. Ne-Yo also invites his girlfriend to a photo shoot, but she ends up getting mad because the photos require him to have women draped over him. At the end, his girlfriend is shown angry again. Ne-Yo gives the camera a wink and makes his way over to her. Throughout the video, during the pre-chorus and chorus, the video shows various women (and one little girl) expressing anger. The music video on YouTube has received over 35 million views as of May 2024.

== Track listings ==
US 12-inch single

A1. "When You're Mad" (main)
A2. "When You're Mad" (instrumental)
B1. "So Sick Remix" (main)
B2. "So Sick Remix" (instrumental)

Australian CD single

1. "When You're Mad" – 3:42
2. "When You're Mad" (instrumental) – 3:42

== Credits and personnel ==
Credits are adapted from the liner notes of In My Own Words.

Studio

- Recorded at Compound Studios (Los Angeles)
- Mixed at Sound on Sound Studios (New York City)
- Mastered at Sterling Sound (New York City)

Personnel

- The Carter Administration – executive production
- Shea Taylor – production, songwriting
- Ne-Yo – songwriting (as Shaffer Smith)
- Curtis "Sauce" Wilson – recording
- Kevin "KD" Davis – mixing
- Sean Tallman – additional engineering
- Robert B. Taylor – guitar
- Tom Coyne – mastering

== Charts ==
=== Weekly charts ===
Chart (2006)	Peak position
Australia (ARIA)	81
Australian Urban (ARIA)	16
Canada CHR/Pop (Radio & Records)	16
US Billboard Hot 100	15
US Hot R&B/Hip-Hop Songs (Billboard)	4
US Pop Airplay (Billboard)	17
US Rhythmic Airplay (Billboard)	10

=== Year-end charts ===
Chart (2006)	Position
US Billboard Hot 100	94
US Hot R&B/Hip-Hop Songs (Billboard)	32

== Certifications ==
Region	Certification	Certified units/sales
New Zealand (RMNZ)	Gold	15,000^{‡}
^{‡} Sales+streaming figures based on certification alone.

== Release history ==
Region	Date	Format(s)	Label(s)	Ref.
United States	March 6, 2006	Rhythmic contemporary; urban radio	Def Jam	
United States	March 20, 2006	Contemporary hit radio	Def Jam	
Australia	November 13, 2006	CD	Def Jam	
