= Go On Girl =

2007 single by Ne-Yo

Single by Ne-Yo

from the album Because of You
- Released: December 4, 2007
- Studio: Westlake Studios; (Los Angeles, California); Battery Studios; (New York City)
- Genre: R&B; pop
- Length: 4:21
- Label: Def Jam
- Songwriters: Ne-Yo; Tor Erik Hermansen; Mikkel S. Eriksen; Espen Lind; Amund Bjørklund
- Producers: Stargate; Ne-Yo (co.)

Ne-Yo singles chronology
"Hate That I Love You" (2007)	"Go On Girl" (2007)	"Bust It Baby Pt. 2" (2008)

"Go On Girl" is a song written by Ne-Yo, Tor Erik Hermansen, Mikkel S. Eriksen, Espen Lind and Amund Bjørklund, for Ne-Yo's second studio album Because of You. It was released to radio as the fourth single on December 4, 2007. It peaked at number 27 on the Billboard Hot R&B/Hip-Hop Songs, giving Ne-Yo his tenth top forty hit on the chart. Also, to date, it has peaked at number 96 on the Billboard Hot 100.

New York rapper Papoose, freestyled over this song in memory of Sean Bell entitled, "We Shall Overcome".

== Track listing ==
US CD single

1. "Go On Girl" (Radio version)
2. "Go On Girl" (Instrumental)

== Music video ==
The video was shot entirely in black and white (except for the model's yellow sash) and was directed by Hype Williams and costume designed by June Ambrose and premiered on MTV Jams. The song's music video features Jade Cole from America's Next Top Model Cycle 6.

== Charts ==
=== Weekly charts ===
Chart (2008)	Peak position
US Billboard Hot 100	96
US Hot R&B/Hip-Hop Songs (Billboard)	27

=== Year-end charts ===
Chart (2008)	Position
US Hot R&B/Hip-Hop Songs (Billboard)	100

== Certifications ==
Region	Certification	Certified units/sales
New Zealand (RMNZ)	Gold	15,000^{‡}
^{‡} Sales+streaming figures based on certification alone.
