= Stay (Ne-Yo song) =

Single by Ne-Yo featuring Peedi Peedi

from the album In My Own Words
- Released: September 19, 2005
- Studio: Westlake (Los Angeles, California)
- Genre: R&B
- Length: 3:51
- Label: Def Jam
- Songwriters: Shaffer Smith; Theron Feemster; Ray Blaylock; Solomon Ridge Jr.; Pedro Zayaz; Mark DeBarge; Etterlene Jordan
- Producer: Ron "Neff-U" Feemster

Ne-Yo singles chronology
| "Stay" (2005) | "So Sick" (2005) |

Music video
- "Stay" on YouTube

"Stay" is the debut single by American singer Ne-Yo, taken from his debut studio album, In My Own Words (2006). Released commercially by Def Jam Recordings in September 2005, it was written by Ne-Yo, Ron "Neff-U" Feemster, Ray Blaylock, Solomon Ridge Jr., and rapper Peedi Peedi—who is also featured on the song. Production of "Stay" was handled by Feemster. The song incorporates an interpolation of American musical group DeBarge's "Stay with Me" (1983). Due to the inclusion of the sample, writers Mark DeBarge, and Etterlene Jordan are also credited as songwriters. The song peaked at number 36 on the Billboard Hot R&B/Hip-Hop Songs chart, and reached top ten of the Finnish Singles Chart.

== Background ==
"Stay" was one of the first songs that Ne-Yo recorded specifically for his debut studio album, In My Own Words (2006). It was written by singer along with Ron "Neff-U" Feemster, Ray Blaylock, Solomon Ridge Jr., and guest vocalist Peedi Peedi, while production on the song was helmed by Feemster. It incorporates an interpolation of American musical group DeBarge's "Stay with Me" (1983). Due to the inclusion of the sample, original writers Mark DeBarge, and Etterlene Jordan are also credited as songwriters. Initially recorded without Peedi Peedi, then-Def Jam CEO Jay-Z felt that "Stay" needed a "hip-hop element." He eventually decided on adding scratches in the beginning of the song, and also consulted Peedi's to record vocals for its bridge.

== Commercial performance ==
Although Def Jam executive L.A. Reid believed that In My Own Words had stronger songs and "Stay" would not "blow up," he considered the song more appropriate to introduce Ne-Yo and get him attention, leading to the song being chosen as the album's lead single over follow-up single "So Sick." Released to US radios on September 19, 2005, "Stay" eventually peaked at number 36 on the US Hot R&B/Hip-Hop Songs chart in October 2005. It also reached top ten of the Finnish Singles Chart.

== Music video ==
A music video for "Stay" was directed by Jessy Terrero, premiered on the BET and VH1 networks in September 2005, and on MTV's TRL in November 2005. Choreographer Tanisha Scott co-stars as Ne-Yo's love interest. Model Shelly Rio also makes a cameo appearance.

== Track listings ==
CD single
| No. | Title | Length |
|---|---|---|
| 1. | "Stay" (radio edit featuring Peedi Peedi) | 3:27 |
| 2. | "Stay" (acoustic version) | 3:04 |

12-inch vinyl
| No. | Title | Length |
|---|---|---|
| 1. | "Stay" (featuring Peedi Peedi) | 3:27 |

== Credits and personnel ==
Credits lifted from the liner notes of In My Own Words.

- Ray Blaylock – writer
- Mark DeBarge – writer (original)
- Theron Feemster – producer, writer
- Robert Horn – recording engineer
- Etterlene Jordan – writer (original)
- Ne-Yo – writer
- Peedi Peedi – writer
- Solomon Ridge Jr. – writer

== Charts ==
Weekly chart performance for "Stay"
| Chart (2005–2006) | Peak position |
|---|---|
| Finland (Suomen virallinen lista) | 8 |
| US Hot R&B/Hip-Hop Songs (Billboard) | 36 |
