= Sexy Love =

2006 single by Ne-Yo

Single by Ne-Yo

from the album In My Own Words
- B-side: "Sign Me Up"
- Released: June 6, 2006
- Studio: Sony (New York City)
- Genre: R&B
- Length: 3:40
- Label: Def Jam
- Songwriters: Shaffer Smith; Mikkel S. Eriksen; Tor Erik Hermansen
- Producer: Stargate

Ne-Yo singles chronology
"When You're Mad" (2006)	"Sexy Love" (2006)	"Because of You" (2007)

Music video
- "Sexy Love" on YouTube

"Sexy Love" is a song by American R&B singer Ne-Yo. It was released on June 6, 2006, as the fourth and final North American single from his debut studio album, In My Own Words (2006). Outside North America, it served as the album's second and final single except in Australia, where "When You're Mad" was also released. "Sexy Love" peaked at number seven on the US Billboard Hot 100 and number five on the UK Singles Chart.

== Background ==
Unlike his previous song "So Sick", "Sexy Love" describes a man's feelings towards his girlfriend and that he is deeply in love with her that he's somewhat addicted to her, and that there's nothing better he'd rather do than to be with his girlfriend. Ne-Yo performed the song on the July 6, 2006, episode of So You Think You Can Dance. On June 27, 2006, he also performed it at the 2006 BET Awards. A remix of the song was made, featuring Candace Jones. Another remix was featuring Roc-A-Fella artist Tru Life. There is also a remix to the song that features rapper Joe Budden as well as a version that features rapper Juelz Santana.

== Composition ==
"Sexy Love" is written in the key of E♭ major with a tempo of 94 beats per minute. The song follows a chord progression of A♭ – B♭ – Gm7, and Ne-Yo's vocals span from G_{4} to B♭_{5}.

== Music video ==
A music video for "Sexy Love" was directed by Anthony Mandler.

== Track listings ==
US 12-inch single
No.	Title	Length
1.	"Sexy Love" (radio)	3:40
2.	"Sexy Love" (instrumental)	3:40

UK CD single
No.	Title	Length
1.	"Sexy Love" (album version)	3:40
2.	"So Sick" (acoustic version—as heard on Radio 1's Jo Whiley Show)	3:02

UK 12-inch single
No.	Title	Length
1.	"Sexy Love" (album version)	3:40
2.	"Sexy Love" (instrumental)	3:40
3.	"So Sick" (remix featuring LL Cool J)

European CD single
No.	Title	Length
1.	"Sexy Love"	3:40
2.	"Sexy Love" (acoustic)	3:33

Australian CD single
No.	Title	Length
1.	"Sexy Love"	3:43
2.	"Sexy Love" (acoustic)	3:35
3.	"Sign Me Up"	3:30
4.	"Sexy Love" (video)

== Credits and personnel ==
Credits are adapted from the liner notes of In My Own Words.

Studio

- Recorded at Sony Music Studios (New York City)
- Mixed at Silent Sound Studios (Atlanta, Georgia)
- Mastered at Sterling Sound (New York City)

Personnel

- The Carter Administration – executive production
- Stargate – production
  - Mikkel S. Eriksen – songwriting, all instruments, recording
  - Tor Erik Hermansen – songwriting, all instruments
- Ne-Yo – songwriting (as Shaffer Smith)
- Phil Tan – mixing
- Tom Coyne – mastering

== Charts ==
=== Weekly charts ===
Chart (2006)	Peak position
Australia (ARIA)	14
Australian Urban (ARIA)	5
Belgium (Ultratip Bubbling Under Flanders)	3
Belgium (Ultratip Bubbling Under Wallonia)	12
Canada CHR/Top 40 (Billboard)	9
Europe (Eurochart Hot 100)	18
France (SNEP)	54
Germany (GfK)	28
Ireland (IRMA)	7
Hungary (Single Top 40)	13
Hungary (Dance Top 40)	31
Netherlands (Dutch Top 40)	30
Netherlands (Single Top 100)	42
New Zealand (Recorded Music NZ)	8
Scottish Singles Sales (Official Charts)	11
Slovakia Airplay (ČNS IFPI)	23
Switzerland (Schweizer Hitparade)	29
UK Singles (Official Charts)	5
UK Hip Hop/R&B (Official Charts)	2
US Billboard Hot 100	7
US Hot R&B/Hip-Hop Songs (Billboard)	2
US Pop Airplay (Billboard)	11
US Rhythmic Airplay (Billboard)	3

=== Year-end charts ===
Chart (2006)	Position
Australian Urban (ARIA)	28
Hungary (Rádiós Top 40)	77
UK Singles (OCC)	65
UK Urban (Music Week)	25
US Billboard Hot 100	51
US Hot R&B/Hip-Hop Songs (Billboard)	16
US Rhythmic Airplay (Billboard)	24

== Certifications ==
Region	Certification	Certified units/sales
Brazil (Pro-Música Brasil)	Platinum	60,000^{‡}
Denmark (IFPI Danmark)	Gold	45,000^{‡}
New Zealand (RMNZ)	2× Platinum	60,000^{‡}
United Kingdom (BPI)	Platinum	600,000^{‡}
United States (RIAA)	Gold	500,000^{*}
United States (RIAA) Mastertone	Platinum	1,000,000^{*}
^{*} Sales figures based on certification alone.^{‡} Sales+streaming figures based on certification alone.

== Release history ==
Region	Date	Format	Label	Ref.
United States	June 6, 2006	Rhythmic contemporary radio	Def Jam	
United States	June 13, 2006	Contemporary hit radio	Def Jam	
United Kingdom	June 26, 2006	CD	Def Jam	
Australia	July 24, 2006	CD	Def Jam	
