= In My Own Words =

Studio album by Ne-Yo
- Released: February 28, 2006
- Studios: Westlake, Compound (Los Angeles); Sony Music, Manhattan Beach (New York City)
- Genre: R&B
- Length: 49:35
- Labels: Compound; Def Jam
- Producers: Boola; Ron "Neff-U" Feemster; Brandon Howard; Sixx John; Ervin "EP" Pope; Brian "B-Nasty" Reid; Stargate; Shea Taylor; Curtis "Sauce" Wilson

Ne-Yo chronology
In My Own Words (2006)	Because of You (2007)

Singles from In My Own Words
- 1. "Stay" Released: September 19, 2005; 2. "So Sick" Released: November 21, 2005; 3. "When You're Mad" Released: March 6, 2006; 4. "Sexy Love" Released: June 6, 2006

In My Own Words is the debut studio album of American singer-songwriter Ne-Yo. It was released by Compound Entertainment and Def Jam Recordings on February 28, 2006. Conceived following his songwriting breakthrough with "Let Me Love You" for fellow R&B singer Mario in 2004, Ne-Yo worked with musicians Ron "Neff-U" Feemster, Brandon Howard, Shea Taylor, and Curtis "Sauce" Wilson, as well as Norwegian production duo Stargate on most of the album, some of which would become regular contributors on subsequent projects. The singer co-wrote the lyrics for each song on In My Own Words which features guest appearances by rappers Peedi Peedi and Ghostface Killah.

Upon its release, the album received generally positive reviews from music critics and earned a Grammy Award nomination in the Best Contemporary R&B Album category. It debuted at number one on the US Billboard 200, with 301,000 copies sold, and reached the top ten of the Canadian Albums Chart. It was subsequently certified platinum by Recording Industry Association of America (RIAA), with 1.5 million copies sold in the United States, and became a platinum-seller in Australia, Japan, and the United Kingdom as well. Four singles were released from the album, including "Stay", "When You're Mad", "Sexy Love", and the number-one hit "So Sick". In further support, Ne-Yo went on tour in August 2006 with singer Chris Brown and Dem Franchize Boyz.

== Background ==
Born into a musical family, Ne-Yo first ventured into music business when he took on the stage name GoGo and joined the R&B group Envy while attending the Las Vegas Academy. The group disbanded in 2000, prompting him to focus on songwriting for other artists before launching his solo career. While collaborating with producer Big D Evans, who said he was perceiving music the way Matrix protagonist Neo sees the franchise's neural interactive simulation, he was given the nickname Ne-Yo, which he then adopted as his stage name. He eventually signed as a solo artist with Columbia Records, but was dropped before releasing his debut album. His song "That Girl" (2003), meant for his first release, was picked up and recorded by Marques Houston. The song's success helped establish Ne-Yo as a rising songwriter. His major breakthrough came with Mario's hit single "Let Me Love You," which became worldwide number-one hit. The success led to a meeting with Def Jam executive L.A. Reid, and although not actively seeking a deal, Ne-Yo was signed by then-CEO Jay-Z after performing for the label.

== Promotion ==
"Stay" featuring rapper Peedi Peedi, one of the first songs that Ne-Yo recorded specifically for the album, was chosen both as Ne-Yo's debut and as the lead single from the project. Although Reid believed that In My Own Words had stronger songs and it would not "blow up," he considered the song more appropriate to introduce the singer and get him attention. Released on September 19, 2005, "Stay" peaked at number 36 on the US Hot R&B/Hip-Hop Songs chart in October 2005. Follow-up "So Sick," a downtempo R&B/pop song, produced by Norwegian duo Stargate, was issued to US radios on November 21, 2005. An instant smash hit, it reached number one in the United States and the United Kingdom and became a top ten hit on most other charts it appeared on, propelling Ne-Yo into the forefront of the R&B scene.

While Ne-Yo had favored "Mirror" to follow "So Sick," Reid and his A&R Tyran "Ty Ty" Smith felt that the song was selling too much sex and that it would not align with Ne-Yo's public image at that time. To further distinguish him from other young male R&B singers such as Trey Songz and Chris Brown, Def Jam eventually released "When You're Mad," another Shea Taylor-produced song, as In My Own Words's third single on March 6, 2006. Less successful than its predecessor, the mid-tempo track reached the top 20 of the US Billboard Hot 100 and became a top five hit on the Hot R&B/Hip-Hop Songs chart. "Sexy Love," another downtempo Stargate production, was released released as the album's fourth and final single on June 6, 2006. The song was considered by Smith as a third single candidate, but Reid chose not to release it directly after "So Sick" for strategic reasons. Released to bigger commercial success, it became a top five hit in the United Kingdom and peaked at number seven on the Billboard Hot 100, while also becoming a top ten hit in Ireland and New Zealand.

== Critical reception ==
Professional ratings
Aggregate scores
Source	Rating
Metacritic	69/100
Review scores
Source	Rating
AllMusic	4.5/5 stars
Entertainment Weekly	B−
Los Angeles Times	2.5/4 stars
PopMatters	7/10
Robert Christgau	(choice cut)
Rolling Stone	3/5 stars
Slant Magazine	2.5/5 stars
Stylus Magazine	B
USA Today	3/4 stars
Pitchfork	8.0/10

At Metacritic, which assigns a normalized rating out of 100 to reviews from critics, the album received an average score of 69, which indicates "generally favorable" reviews, based on 11 reviews. AllMusic editor Andy Kellman gave In My Own Words a four-and-a-half-out-of-five-stars-rating and noted that it "could turn out to be the most impressive R&B debut of 2006, as well as one of several milestones in a lengthy career [...] It's very focused and surprisingly taut, especially for a debut that involves several producers [...] Its modern approach, interlocked with touches of '70s and '80s R&B sensibilities, is also in effect for the entirety of the album." In his review for USA Today, Steve Jones remarked that "Ne-Yo is the latest in a recent line of engaging young R&B singers but with his own words he sets himself apart [...] On his soulful solo debut, it's apparent that the Las Vegas-bred singer saved some of his best lyrical work for himself." Yardbarker listed the album among "The best R&B albums of the 2000s."

Dan Nishimoto from PopMatters declared the album a "notable success. With spare but clean, rounded yet consistent production, the album has an appealing azure quality." Billboard found that "though, at times, the lyrics are a bit too sentimental and production is spotty, In My Own Words should have listeners clinging to Ne-Yo's every word." Kelefa Sanneh, writer for The New York Times, complimented Ne-Yo for his "smooth" writing and added: "Not everything on this CD is that brilliant, or that shameless, but Ne-Yo is a deft and appealing player in the game of modern-day R&B." Slightly less impressed, Slant Magazine's Sal Cinquemani found that In My Own Words "might pale next to [John] Legend’s stellar debut, but, even at its Robert Kelly worst, it’s not hateable. And isn’t that all one can ask for from mainstream R&B these days?" Blender wrote that "even at its weepiest, his music, thankfully, stays vivacious." Raymond Fiore from Entertainment Weekly called the album a "confident if slightly underwhelming debut."

== Commercial performance ==
In the United States, In My Own Words debuted at number one on the US Billboard 200, with 301,000 copies sold in its first week. In its second week, the album remained in the top ten, falling to number five with 113,000 copies sold, a 62 percent decline from its debut. In its third week, the album rose to number four, selling a further 77,000 copies. On March 29, 2006, In My Own Words was certified platinum by the Recording Industry Association of America (RIAA) for sales of more than one million copies in the United States. The album later reached double platinum status, and by March 2007 had sold 1.4 million copies in the United States.

Internationally, In My Own Words achieved moderate chart success, reaching the top 20 in several markets. The album peaked at number one on both the UK R&B Albums Chart, also reaching the top ten in Canada, where it peaked at number nine, and entered the top 20 in France, Japan, Switzerland, and the United Kingdom. Elsewhere, it charted within the top 50 in countries including Australia, Germany, the Netherlands, and New Zealand. Receiving several certifications internationally, it was certified platinum by the British Phonographic Industry (BPI) in the United Kingdom, platinum by the Recording Industry Association of Japan (RIAJ), and platinum by Recorded Music NZ (RMNZ) in New Zealand.

== Track listing ==
In My Own Words track listing
No.	Title	Writer(s)	Producer(s)	Length
1.	"Stay" (featuring Peedi Peedi)	Shaffer Smith; Ron "Neff-U" Feemster; Ray Blaylock; Solomon Ridge; Pedro Zayas; Mark DeBarge; Etterlene Jordan	Feemster	3:52
2.	"Let Me Get This Right"	Smith; Brian "B-Nasty" Reid; Ridge; Blaylock	Reid	3:48
3.	"So Sick"	Smith; Tor Erik Hermansen; Mikkel S. Eriksen	Stargate	3:29
4.	"When You're Mad"	Smith; Shea Taylor	Taylor	3:42
5.	"It Just Ain't Right"	Smith; Curtis "Sauce" Wilson; Gregory Williams; Bobby DeBarge	Wilson	3:48
6.	"Mirror"	Smith; Taylor	Taylor	3:48
7.	"Sign Me Up"	Smith; Feemster	Feemster	3:27
8.	"I Ain't Gotta Tell You"	Smith; Alfred Lewis; Brandon Howard	Boola; Howard^{[a]}	3:17
9.	"Get Down Like That"	Smith; Ervin "EP" Pope; Bunny Sigler	Pope	4:06
10.	"Sexy Love"	Smith; Hermansen; Eriksen	Stargate	3:41
11.	"Let Go"	Smith; Hermansen; Eriksen	Stargate	3:49
12.	"Time"	Smith; Hermansen; Eriksen	Stargate	3:49
13.	"Get Down Like That (Remix)" (featuring Ghostface Killah)	Smith; Pope; Sigler; Dennis Coles	Pope	4:59
Total length:				49:35

UK bonus tracks
No.	Title	Writer(s)	Producer(s)	Length
13.	"Girlfriend"	Smith; Kenneth Gamble; Leon Huff; John	Sixx John	4:00
14.	"Get Down Like That (Remix)" (featuring Ghostface Killah)	Smith; Pope; Sigler; Coles	Pope	4:59
Total length:				53:35

Japan bonus tracks
No.	Title	Writer(s)	Producer(s)	Length
13.	"Girlfriend"	Smith; Gamble; Huff; John	Sixx John	4:00
14.	"Lonely"	Smith; John	John	4:41
15.	"So Sick (Remix)" (featuring LL Cool J)	Smith; Hermansen; Eriksen	Stargate	4:24
16.	"Back Like That" (featuring Ghostface Killah)	Smith; Shawn Carter; Kanye West; Coles; Xtreme (USA)	Xtreme (USA)	4:03
17.	"Stay" (featuring Rick Ross)	Smith; William Roberts II; Blaylock; Jordan; DeBarge; Feemster; Solomon Ridge	Feemster; Pope	4:07
18.	"Get Down Like That (Remix)" (featuring Ghostface Killah) (hidden track)	Smith; Pope; Sigler; Coles	Pope	4:57

Japanese limited edition (bonus DVD)
No.	Title	Director(s)	Length
1.	"Stay" (Music video)	Jessy Terrero	4:13
2.	"So Sick" (Music video)	Hype Williams	3:31
3.	"When You're Mad"	Little X	3:41
4.	"Sexy Love"	Anthony Mandler	4:05
Total length:			15:30

Notes

- ^{^[a]} signifies an additional producer

Sample credits

- "Stay" contains an interpolation of "Stay with Me", written by Mark DeBarge and Etterlene Jordan, and performed by DeBarge.
- "It Just Ain't Right" contains a sample of "I Call Your Name", written by Bobby DeBarge and Gregory Williams, and performed Switch.
- "Get Down Like That" contains a sample from The O'Jays' "I Swear, I Love No One But You", written by Bunny Sigler and performed by The O'Jays.

== Personnel ==
Credits adapted from album's liner notes.

- Tom Coyne – mastering
- Kevin "KD" Davis – mixing (tracks 3–6, 8, 9, 11, 13)
- Mikkel S. Eriksen – producer, engineer, and all instruments (tracks 3, 10–12)
- Ron "Neff-U" Feemstar – producer (tracks 1, 7)
- Ghostface Killah – rap (track 13)
- Larry Gold – strings (track 12)
- Tor Erik Hermansen – producer and all instruments (tracks 3, 10–12)
- Robert "Bob the Builder" Horn – engineer and mixing (tracks 1, 2, 7)
- Brandon Howard – additional production (track 8)
- Alrad "Boola" Lewis – producer (track 8)
- Ne-Yo – vocals (all tracks)
- Peedi Peedi – vocals (track 1)
- Dave Pensado – mixing (track 12)
- Ervin "EP" Pope – producer (tracks 9, 13)
- Brian "B-Nasty" Reid – producer (track 2)
- Nisan Stewart – drums (track 12)
- Sean Tallman – additional engineering (tracks 3, 4, 6, 9, 13)
- Phil Tan – mixing (track 10)
- Shea Taylor – producer and guitar (tracks 4, 6)
- Michael Tocci – engineer (track 5)
- Curtis "Sauce" Wilson – producer (track 5), engineer (tracks 4, 6, 9, 13)

== Charts ==
=== Weekly charts ===
Weekly chart performance for In My Own Words
Chart (2006)	Peak position
Australian Albums (ARIA)	41
Austrian Albums (Ö3 Austria)	63
Belgian Albums (Ultratop Flanders)	83
Canadian Albums (Billboard)	9
Dutch Albums (Album Top 100)	50
French Albums (SNEP)	20
German Albums (Offizielle Top 100)	27
Irish Albums (IRMA)	81
Japanese Albums (Oricon)	12
New Zealand Albums (RMNZ)	35
Scottish Albums (Official Charts)	48
Swiss Albums (Schweizer Hitparade)	11
UK Albums (Official Charts)	14
UK R&B Albums (Official Charts)	1
US Billboard 200	1
US Top R&B/Hip-Hop Albums (Billboard)	1

=== Year-end charts ===
Year-end chart performance for In My Own Words
Chart (2006)	Position
Japanese Albums (Oricon)	58
UK Albums (OCC)	98
US Billboard 200	27
US Top R&B/Hip-Hop Albums (Billboard)	4

== Certifications ==
Certifications for In My Own Words
Region	Certification	Certified units/sales
Japan (RIAJ)	Platinum	250,000^{^}
New Zealand (RMNZ)	Platinum	15,000^{‡}
United Kingdom (BPI)	Platinum	300,000^{‡}
United States (RIAA)	2× Platinum	2,000,000^{‡}
^{^} Shipments figures based on certification alone.^{‡} Sales+streaming figures based on certification alone.
