= So Sick =

2005 single by Ne-Yo

Single by Ne-Yo

from the album In My Own Words
- Released: November 21, 2005
- Studio: Sony (New York City)
- Genre: R&B
- Length: 3:27
- Label: Def Jam
- Songwriters: Mikkel S. Eriksen; Tor Erik Hermansen; Shaffer Smith
- Producer: Stargate

Ne-Yo singles chronology
"Stay" (2005)	"So Sick" (2005)	"Back Like That" (2006)

Music video
- "So Sick" on YouTube

"So Sick" is a song by American singer-songwriter Ne-Yo, written alongside Norwegian production duo Stargate for Ne-Yo's debut studio album, In My Own Words (2006). Produced by Stargate, the song was released as the second single from the album on November 21, 2005, and received positive reviews from music critics. "So Sick" peaked at number one on both the US Billboard Hot 100 and the UK Singles Chart. In Europe, the single topped the Eurochart Hot 100 and entered the top 20 in 10 countries, including Denmark, Hungary, Ireland, Norway, and Switzerland. In Australasia, the single reached number two in New Zealand and number four in Australia.

== Background ==
Ne-Yo met Norwegian production team Stargate, consisting of Mikkel S. Eriksen and Tor Erik Hermansen, in a hallway at Sony Music Studios on West 54th Street, New York City after the duo had settled there in early 2005. After finding out they produced R&B-oriented tracks, among others, they started on writing songs for his debut studio album In My Own Words (2006) for which they produced six songs, including "So Sick".

While Eriksen and Hermansen composed the music for the song, Ne-Yo penned the song's lyrics. "So Sick" centers on a character, who is tired of hearing love songs playing on the radio, as they remind him of his last relationship and breakup. Ne-Yo later confirmed that he got the idea for the song from a former girlfriend: "It's about the first time I fell in love with a girl in a way that I completely screwed it up. So it was a story that I didn't have to think really hard about putting it together. A lot of heartbreak went into that song, so that's why I think a lot of people dug it the way they did – because you can feel it."

== Reception ==
"So Sick" received generally positive responses from contemporary music critics. Bill Lamb of About stated that the smooth instrumental of the song makes it stand out and appropriate to listen during the mid-winter season. He was pleased with Ne-Yo's vocals but noted that "more emotional involvement would have made his performance more memorable", calling them "restrained". A review from Contactmusic.com echoed the latter's comment, saying that his vocal rendition is "stunning", while complimenting the Stargate production, defining it as a "melodic masterpiece". Rolling Stone listed "So Sick" as the 41st best R&B song of the 21st century.

== Music video ==
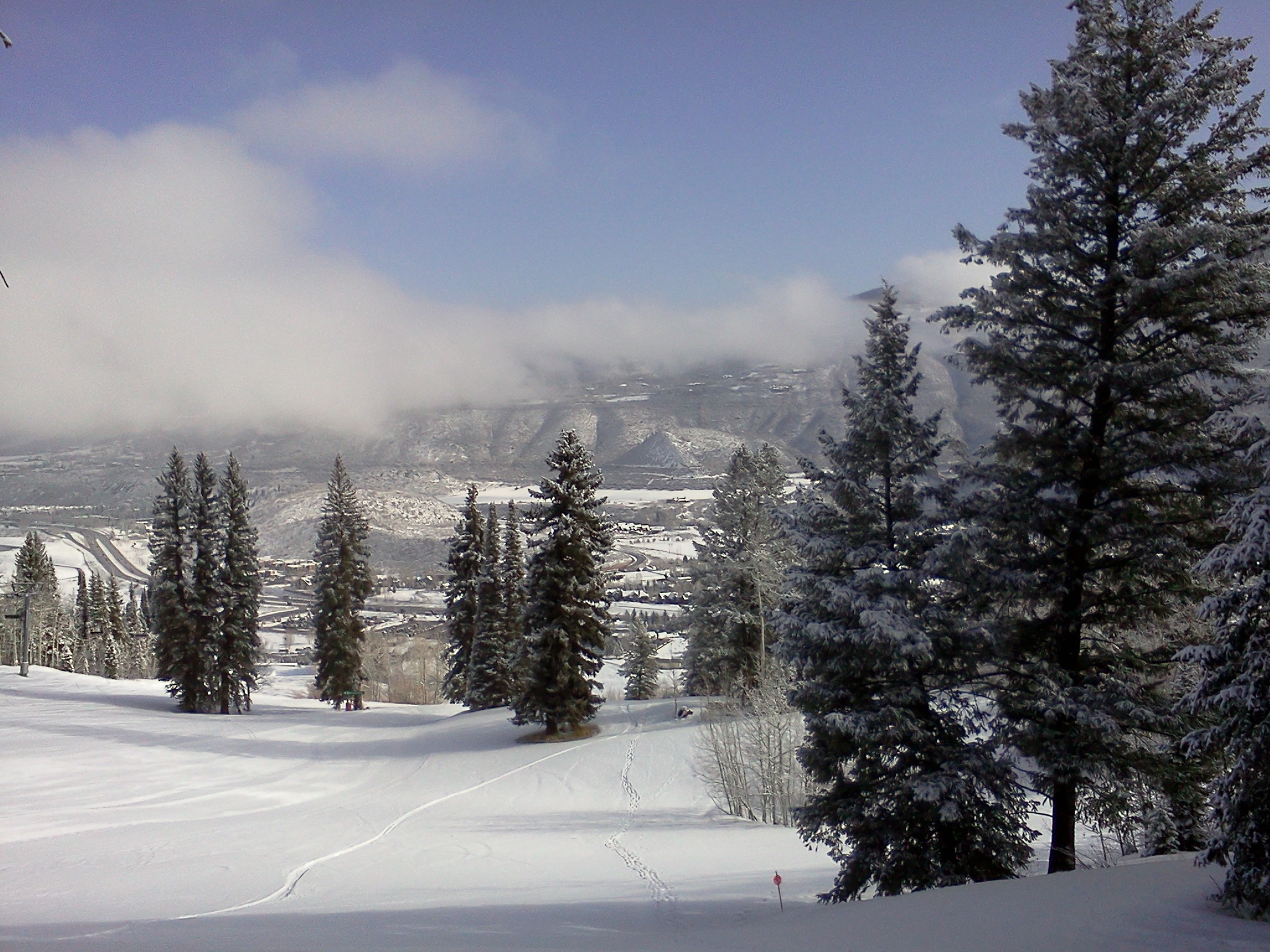
The music video for "So Sick" was filmed in various locations throughout Aspen, Colorado

The music video for "So Sick" was directed by Hype Williams and filmed in Aspen, Colorado. Shot in the snow as well as inside a mansion, Ne-Yo commented on filming: "The house we rented out was ridiculous. The walls turned, and there were heated floors. It was crazy." It saw heavy rotation on music video networks BET and MTV.

Two music videos were shot for the song, the discarded version featured an urban imagery different to the winter-snow scenario of the original one.

== Remixes ==
There are five "So Sick" remixes. The official remix was produced by Trackmasters and features rap vocals by LL Cool J and sampled Michael Jackson's song "Human Nature". This remix first appeared on LL Cool J's eleventh album, Todd Smith. One features Jin. Another remix features labelmate Jay-Z. There is also a remix with rapper Joe Budden. Another remix is sung by Patrick Stump from Fall Out Boy, who has also been known to cover the song.

== Track listings ==
UK CD single
No.	Title	Writer(s)	Producer(s)	Length
1.	"So Sick"	Shaffer Smith; Tor Erik Hermansen; Mikkel S. Eriksen	Stargate	3:29
2.	"Sign Me Up"	Smith; Ron "Neff-U" Feemster	Feemster	3:27

European 12-inch single
No.	Title	Writer(s)	Producer(s)	Length
1.	"So Sick"	Smith; Hermansen; Eriksen	Stargate	3:29
2.	"So Sick" (instrumental)	Smith; Hermansen; Eriksen	Stargate	3:29
3.	"Get Down Like That" (remix featuring Ghostface Killah)	Smith; Ervin "EP" Pope; Bunny Sigler; Dennis Coles	Pope	4:59

Australian and New Zealand CD single
No.	Title	Writer(s)	Producer(s)	Length
1.	"So Sick"	Smith; Hermansen; Eriksen	Stargate	3:29
2.	"So Sick" (instrumental)	Smith; Hermansen; Eriksen	Stargate	3:29
3.	"Sign Me Up"	Smith; Feemster	Feemster	3:27
4.	"So Sick" (video)

== Credits and personnel ==
Credits are adapted from the liner notes of In My Own Words.

Studios

- Recorded at Sony Music Studios (New York City)
- Mixed at Sound on Sound Studios (New York City)
- Mastered at Sterling Sound (New York City)

Personnel

- The Carter Administration – executive production
- Stargate – production
  - Mikkel S. Eriksen – songwriting, all instruments, recording
  - Tor Erik Hermansen – songwriting, all instruments
- Ne-Yo – songwriting (as Shaffer Smith)
- Sean Tallman – additional engineering
- Kevin "KD" Davis – mixing
- Tom Coyne – mastering

== Charts ==
=== Weekly charts ===
Chart (2006–2026)	Peak position
Australia (ARIA)	4
Australian Urban (ARIA)	2
Austria (Ö3 Austria Top 40)	21
Belgium (Ultratop 50 Flanders)	17
Belgium (Ultratip Bubbling Under Wallonia)	1
Canada (Nielsen SoundScan)	4
Canada CHR/Pop Top 30 (Radio & Records)	1
Czech Republic Airplay (ČNS IFPI)	16
Denmark (Tracklisten)	10
Europe (Eurochart Hot 100)	1
France (SNEP)	11
Germany (GfK)	11
Hungary (Rádiós Top 40)	7
Ireland (IRMA)	2
Italy (FIMI)	30
Netherlands (Dutch Top 40)	11
Netherlands (Single Top 100)	11
New Zealand (Recorded Music NZ)	2
Norway (VG-lista)	10
Philippines (Philippines Hot 100)	70
Scottish Singles Sales (Official Charts)	3
Slovakia Airplay (ČNS IFPI)	94
Switzerland (Schweizer Hitparade)	5
UK Singles (Official Charts)	1
UK Hip Hop/R&B (Official Charts)	1
Ukraine Airplay (TopHit)	181
US Billboard Hot 100	1
US Hot R&B/Hip-Hop Songs (Billboard)	3
US Pop Airplay (Billboard)	1
US Rhythmic Airplay (Billboard)	1

=== Year-end charts ===
Chart (2006)	Position
Australia (ARIA)	28
Australian Urban (ARIA)	7
Belgium (Ultratop 50 Flanders)	79
Brazil (Crowley)	73
Europe (Eurochart Hot 100)	61
Germany (Media Control GfK)	75
Hungary (Rádiós Top 40)	37
Netherlands (Dutch Top 40)	90
New Zealand (RIANZ)	20
Switzerland (Schweizer Hitparade)	46
UK Singles (OCC)	32
UK Urban (Music Week)	13
US Billboard Hot 100	17
US Hot R&B/Hip-Hop Songs (Billboard)	3
US Rhythmic Airplay (Billboard)	9

== Certifications ==
Region	Certification	Certified units/sales
Australia (ARIA)	Gold	35,000^{^}
Brazil (Pro-Música Brasil)	3× Platinum	180,000^{‡}
Denmark (IFPI Danmark)	2× Platinum	180,000^{‡}
Germany (BVMI)	Gold	150,000^{‡}
Japan (RIAJ) Ringtone	2× Platinum	500,000^{*}
Japan (RIAJ) Full-length ringtone	Gold	100,000^{*}
New Zealand (RMNZ)	4× Platinum	120,000^{‡}
Portugal (AFP)	Platinum	10,000^{‡}
United Kingdom (BPI)	3× Platinum	1,800,000^{‡}
United States (RIAA)	Gold	500,000^{*}
United States (RIAA) Mastertone	Platinum	1,000,000^{*}
Streaming
Denmark (IFPI Danmark)	Gold	900,000^{†}
^{*} Sales figures based on certification alone.^{^} Shipments figures based on certification alone.^{‡} Sales+streaming figures based on certification alone.^{†} Streaming-only figures based on certification alone.

== Release history ==
Region	Date	Format(s)	Label(s)	Ref.
United States	November 21, 2005	Rhythmic contemporary; urban radio	Def Jam	
United States	December 19, 2005	Contemporary hit radio	Def Jam	
United States	January 30, 2006	Urban adult contemporary radio	Def Jam	
United Kingdom	March 20, 2006	CD	Def Jam	
Australia	April 10, 2006	CD	Def Jam	

== Covers and samples ==
In 2020, Australian rapper The Kid Laroi released a reworking of the song called "Need You Most (So Sick)", from his debut mixtape, F*ck Love. The song was sampled by Pop Smoke for his 2021 song "Woo Baby" (featuring Chris Brown) contained in his second album Faith. Central Cee and Lil Durk's collaboration "Truth in the Lies" sampled the song's instrumental. In 2019, American rapper Luh Kel's song '"Pull Up" from the album "Mixed Emotions" also sampled this song.
