= 2009 Soul Train Music Awards =

Music awards ceremony in Atlanta, US

Soul Train Music Awards
- Date: November 29, 2009
- Location: Georgia World Congress Center, Atlanta, Georgia
- Country: United States
- Hosted by: Terrence Howard and Taraji P. Henson
- First award: 1987

Highlights
- Most awards: Beyoncé (3)
- Website: soultrain.com

Television/radio coverage
- Network: BET, Centric

The 2009 Soul Train Music Awards were held at the Georgia World Congress Center in Atlanta, Georgia on November 29, 2009. The show was hosted by Oscar nominated actor Terrence Howard and Oscar nominated actress Taraji P. Henson. Performers included Keri Hilson, Toni Braxton, Trey Songz, Mario, Raheem DeVaughn, Ludacris, Ryan Leslie, and Robin Thicke.

Singers Chaka Khan and Charlie Wilson received the honoree Soul Train Legend Award. Michael Jackson was honoree for posthumous award for Entertainer of the Year. Beyoncé won three awards; Best Female Artist, Song of the Year, and Album of the Year. LeToya served as host for the Red-Carpet Show.

Upon its return, BET commissioned a new trophy for the Soul Train Music Awards. The new trophy, a train, replaced the signature African mask trophy used from 1987 to 2007.

== Special awards ==
=== Entertainer of the Year (Posthumous Honor) ===
- Michael Jackson

=== Legend Award – Female ===
- Chaka Khan

=== Legend Award – Male ===
- Charlie Wilson

== Winners and nominees ==
=== Album of the Year ===
- Beyoncé – I Am... Sasha Fierce
  - Jamie Foxx – Intuition
  - Maxwell – Blacksummers'night
  - Ne-Yo – Year of the Gentleman
  - Kanye West – 808s & Heartbreak

=== Song of the Year ===
- Beyoncé – "Single Ladies (Put a Ring on It)"
  - Keri Hilson (featuring Lil Wayne) – "Turnin Me On"
  - Jennifer Hudson – "Spotlight"
  - Mary Mary – "God in Me"
  - Maxwell – "Pretty Wings"

=== The Ashford & Simpson Songwriter's Award ===
- Jamie Foxx (featuring T-Pain) – "Blame It"
  - Written by: Christopher "Deep" Henderson, Nate Walker, James T. Brown, John Conte Jr., David Ballard and Brandon Melanchon
- Beyoncé – "Single Ladies (Put a Ring on It)"
  - Written by: Christopher Stewart, Terius Nash, Thaddis Harrell and Beyoncé Knowles
- Drake – "Best I Ever Had"
  - Written by: Aubrey Graham, Danny Hamilton, Dwayne Carter, Matthew Samuels and Nakia Coleman
- Keri Hilson (featuring Kanye West and Ne-Yo) – "Knock You Down"
  - Written by: Nate Hills, Keri Hilson, Kevin Cossom, Shaffer Smith, Marcella Araica and Kanye West
- Maxwell – "Pretty Wings"
  - Written by: Gerald Rivera and Hod David

=== Best Male R&B/Soul Artist ===
- Maxwell
  - Raphael Saadiq
  - Musiq Soulchild
  - Robin Thicke
  - Charlie Wilson

=== Best Female R&B/Soul Artist ===
- Beyoncé
  - Whitney Houston
  - Jennifer Hudson
  - Ledisi
  - Chrisette Michele

=== Best New Artist ===
- Keri Hilson
  - Drake
  - Ryan Leslie
  - Solange
  - Jazmine Sullivan

=== Best Reggae Artist ===
- Sean Paul
  - Ziggy Marley
  - Mavado
  - Tarrus Riley
  - Serani

=== CENTRIC Award ===
- Maysa
  - Corneille
  - Laura Izibor
  - The Knux
  - Eric Roberson

=== Best Gospel Performance – Male, Female or Group ===
- Mary Mary – "God in Me"
  - Fred Hammond (featuring John P Kee) – "They That Wait"
  - Smokie Norful – "Justified"
  - Marvin Sapp – "Praise Him in Advance"
  - BeBe & CeCe Winans – "Close to You"

=== Best Collaboration ===
- Keri Hilson (featuring Kanye West and Ne-Yo) – "Knock You Down"
  - Keyshia Cole (featuring Monica) – "Trust"
  - Mario (featuring Gucci Mane and Sean Garrett) – "Break Up"
  - Mary Mary (featuring Kierra "Kiki" Sheard) – "God in Me"
  - Trey Songz (featuring Drake) – "Successful"

== Performers ==
- Chrisette Michele
- Keri Hilson
- Mario and Sean Garrett
- Raheem DeVaughn and Ludacris
- Robin Thicke
- Ryan Leslie
- Toni Braxton and Trey Songz

=== Tribute performances ===
Charlie Wilson Legend Tribute

- K-Ci & JoJo
- Raheem DeVaughn

Chaka Khan Legend Tribute

- Angie Stone
- Erykah Badu
- Fantasia
- Ledisi
- Melle Mel

Motown Musical Moment

- Boyz II Men
- Chico DeBarge
- Estelle
- Hal Linton
- Henson
- Johnny Gill
- Melanie Fiona
- Mike Phillips
- Vita

== Telecast ==
The Soul Train Awards aired on BET and Centric on November 29, 2009. It was also broadcast on BET UK.

== Trivia ==
The Soul Train Awards was a trending topic during its time on-air on the social media site, Twitter.

The Soul Train trophy, originally the trademark African ceremonial mask (Soul Train Music Award for Heritage Award – Career Achievement) is replaced with an actual train.

In an episode of Community, "Social Psychology", character Troy mentions the Soul Train Awards when complaining about participating in a study that never begins.

== See also ==
- Soul Train Awards
