= Miss Independent (Ne-Yo song) =

2008 single by Ne-Yo

Single by Ne-Yo

from the album Year of the Gentleman
- Released: August 26, 2008
- Studio: Roc the Mic (New York City)
- Genre: R&B; dancehall
- Length: 3:52
- Label: Def Jam
- Songwriters: Mikkel S. Eriksen; Tor Erik Hermansen; Shaffer Smith
- Producer: Stargate

Ne-Yo singles chronology
"Closer" (2008)	"Miss Independent" (2008)	"Single" (2008)

Music video
- "Miss Independent" on YouTube

"Miss Independent"
Ne-Yo's "Miss Independent" from Year of the Gentleman

"Miss Independent" is a song by American singer-songwriter Ne-Yo. It is the second single from his album. Year of the Gentleman (2008), and was produced by Stargate. It samples the song "Forget About Me" by Keesha (Lil Bit). The song was written by Ne-Yo and co-written by Stargate. It was released as a music download on August 26, 2008, and physical release on September 2, 2008.

== Chart performance ==
"Miss Independent" debuted at number 98 on the US Billboard Hot 100 chart, on the week of September 6, 2008. The next week, the song made a big jump to number 32 on the chart. The following week, the song climbed to number 27. The song finally hit the top ten in its eighth week, climbing to number nine on the chart, giving Ne-Yo his second consecutive top ten single from the album. It eventually reached its peak at number seven on the chart, the week of December 13, 2008. On July 31, 2009, the single was certified platinum by the Recording Industry Association of America (RIAA) for sales of over a million digital copies in the United States.

On the US Hot R&B/Hip-Hop Songs chart, the song has been much more successful than the first single from the album, "Closer", reaching number one, giving Ne-Yo his first chart-topper as a performer (on that chart). In the United Kingdom, the song entered the UK Singles Chart at number 39 on downloads alone on August 31, 2008. The single later reached its peak at number six on the chart.

== Music video ==
The music video of "Miss Independent" was shot with director Chris Robinson on Monday, August 11, 2008 in Santa Monica, California. It featured cameos from Keri Hilson, Gabrielle Union, Lauren London and Trey Songz. It begins with Ne-Yo as a corporate boss walking to his office through his employee's office. As he walks by, various office workers (played by various singers) say good morning to Ne-Yo, who is enjoying the sight of all the women. The video continues with Ne-Yo at a meeting getting interrupted by his boss (played by Union) who apologizes to him in the end and asks what she can do to make it up to him.

The music video on YouTube has received over 630 million views as of Feb 2026.

== Awards ==
On February 8, 2009, at the 51st Grammy Awards, Ne-Yo won two awards for "Miss Independent", Best Male R&B Vocal Performance and Best R&B Song.

== Track listings ==
German and UK CD single
No.	Title	Writer(s)	Producer(s)	Length
1.	"Miss Independent"	Smith; Tor Erik Hermansen; Mikkel S. Eriksen	Stargate; Ne-Yo^{[a]}	3:52
2.	"Miss Independent" (Instrumental)	Smith; Hermansen; Eriksen	Stargate; Ne-Yo^{[a]}	3:50
3.	"Closer" (Stonebridge Club Remix)	Smith; Hermansen; Eriksen; Magnus Beite; Bernt Rune Stray	Stargate; Ne-Yo^{[a]}	3:52
4.	"Miss Independent" (Video)			3:50

Notes

- ^{^[a]} signifies a co-producer

== Charts ==
=== Weekly charts ===
Weekly chart performance for "Miss Independent"
Chart (2008–2024)	Peak position
Australia (ARIA)	40
Austria (Ö3 Austria Top 40)	54
Belgium (Ultratip Bubbling Under Flanders)	2
Belgium (Ultratip Bubbling Under Wallonia)	20
Bulgaria (BAMP)	1
Canada Hot 100 (Billboard)	21
Czech Republic Airplay (ČNS IFPI)	32
Denmark (Tracklisten)	32
European Hot 100 Singles (Billboard)	19
France (SNEP)	16
Germany (GfK)	30
Hungary (Rádiós Top 40)	15
Ireland (IRMA)	9
Italy (FIMI)	12
Japan Hot 100 (Billboard)	6
Netherlands (Dutch Top 40)	6
Netherlands (Single Top 100)	34
New Zealand (Recorded Music NZ)	4
Philippines (Philippines Hot 100)	96
Romania (Romanian Top 100)	5
Slovakia Airplay (ČNS IFPI)	2
Sweden (Sverigetopplistan)	56
Switzerland (Schweizer Hitparade)	67
UK Singles (Official Charts)	6
UK Hip Hop/R&B (Official Charts)	16
US Billboard Hot 100	7
US Hot R&B/Hip-Hop Songs (Billboard)	1
US Pop Airplay (Billboard)	10
US Rhythmic Airplay (Billboard)	3

=== Monthly charts ===
Monthly chart performance for "Miss Independent"
Chart (2009)	Peak position
Brazil (Brasil Hot 100 Airplay)	65

=== Year-end charts ===
2008 year-end chart performance for "Miss Independent"
Chart (2008)	Position
Hungary (Rádiós Top 40)	34
Japan (Japan Hot 100)	55
New Zealand (RIANZ)	37
UK Singles (OCC)	57
UK Urban (Music Week)	5
US Billboard Hot 100	57
US Hot R&B/Hip-Hop Songs (Billboard)	27
US Rhythmic Airplay (Billboard)	34

2009 year-end chart performance for "Miss Independent"
Chart (2009)	Position
Brazil (Crowley)	55
Hungary (Rádiós Top 40)	114
Italy (FIMI)	69
Netherlands (Dutch Top 40)	72
US Billboard Hot 100	59
US Hot R&B/Hip-Hop Songs (Billboard)	23
US Rhythmic Airplay (Billboard)	33

== Certifications ==
Region	Certification	Certified units/sales
Brazil (Pro-Música Brasil)	Diamond	250,000^{‡}
Denmark (IFPI Danmark)	Platinum	90,000^{‡}
Italy (FIMI)	Gold	50,000^{‡}
New Zealand (RMNZ)	4× Platinum	120,000^{‡}
Portugal (AFP)	Platinum	25,000^{‡}
United Kingdom (BPI)	2× Platinum	1,200,000^{‡}
United States (RIAA)	Platinum	1,000,000^{*}
^{*} Sales figures based on certification alone.^{‡} Sales+streaming figures based on certification alone.

== Remix: "She Got Her Own" (Miss Independent Part 2) ==
"She Got Her Own (Miss Independent Part 2)"

Single by Ne-Yo featuring Fabolous and Jamie Foxx

from the album Intuition and Year of the Gentleman (Japan Edition)
- Released: December 14, 2008
- Recorded: 2008
- Genre: R&B; hip-hop
- Length: 5:32 (album version); 4:16 (radio edit)
- Label: J; Island Def Jam
- Songwriters: Shaffer Smith; John Jackson; Donna Summer; David Brown; Antonio Jiminez
- Producer: Butter Beats

Ne-Yo singles chronology
"Camera Phone" (2008)	"She Got Her Own" (2008)	"Mad" (2008)

Jamie Foxx singles chronology
"Just Like Me" (2008)	"She Got Her Own" (2008)	"Blame It" (2009)

Fabolous singles chronology
"Good Lovin'" (2008)	"She Got Her Own" (2008)	"Throw It in the Bag" (2009)

Music video
- "She Got Her Own" on YouTube

The official remix entitled "She Got Her Own" (Miss Independent Part 2) was released as a single for both Ne-Yo and singer/actor Jamie Foxx and features rapper Fabolous. It is available as a bonus track in Japan and the pre-order of Year of the Gentleman in the UK iTunes Store. The song was also featured on Foxx's album, Intuition, as its second single on December 14, 2008. It samples the 1979 song "My Baby Understands" by Donna Summer.

A music video for "She Got Her Own" directed by Vinroc was released on September 22, 2008. It featured cameo appearances by Estelle, Eve, Keyshia Cole, Jill Marie Jones, Teyana Taylor and twins Malika Haqq & Khadijah Haqq from the 2006 film ATL . Ne-Yo, Jamie Foxx, and Fabolous performed "She Got Her Own" at the 2009 BET Awards.

=== Other remixes ===
A remix that features T-Pain & Young Cash was released. Trinidadian rapper Nicki Minaj also remixed it, along with Jamaican dancehall artists Vybz Kartel and Spice titled "Ramping Shop", from the latter's album Pon Di Gaza 2.0. Jamaican artists Busy Signal and Sizzla released versions of the song as well.

=== Charts ===
==== Weekly charts ====
Weekly chart performance
Chart (2008–09)	Peak position
US Billboard Hot 100	54
US Hot R&B/Hip-Hop Songs (Billboard)	2
US Rhythmic Airplay (Billboard)	29

==== Year-end charts ====
Annual chart rankings
Chart (2009)	Position
US Hot R&B/Hip-Hop Songs (Billboard)	8
US Radio Songs (Billboard)	71

== See also ==
- List of R&B number-one singles of 2008 (U.S.)
