= Histrionic =

Histrionic may refer to:

- related to or reminiscent of (theatrical) acting, or acting out
- Histrionic personality disorder, a Cluster B personality disorder
- Histrionics (album), by The Higher
- Histrionicus, a genus of ducks

== See also ==
- Histrionicotoxin, toxins found in the skin of poison frogs
