= Closer (Ne-Yo song) =

2008 single by Ne-Yo

Single by Ne-Yo

from the album Year of the Gentleman
- Released: April 8, 2008
- Genre: Dance-pop; house
- Length: 3:54
- Label: Def Jam
- Songwriters: Shaffer Smith; Magnus Beite; Bernt Rune Stray
- Producers: StarGate; Ne-Yo

Ne-Yo singles chronology
"Finer Things" (2008)	"Closer" (2008)	"Miss Independent" (2008)

Music video
- "Closer" on YouTube

"Closer" is a song by the American recording artist Ne-Yo. The song was produced by Stargate. It was released as the lead single from Ne-Yo's third album, Year of the Gentleman (2008).

"Closer" peaked at number seven on the US Billboard Hot 100. Outside of the United States, "Closer" topped the charts in the United Kingdom and peaked within the top 10 of the charts in several other countries, including Australia, Austria, Germany, Finland, Ireland and New Zealand.

== Background ==
"Closer" marked a musical departure for Ne-Yo, taking on a dance-pop style over the more rhythmic and urban sound his songs usually possess. In the song, Ne-Yo sings of having an urging attraction to a woman he sees, having the desire to "come closer" to her. His attraction to her becomes stronger, and almost hypnotic, as he sings, "And I just can't pull myself away, under a spell I can't break/I just can't stop." The song was featured in episodes of The CW shows Gossip Girl and 90210.

Speaking in May 2008 to noted UK R&B writer Pete Lewis of the award-winning Blues & Soul, Ne-Yo explained the inspiration behind the song: "It was very much inspired by just the vibe of some of these house and techno clubs we went to while we were in London. You know, kinda smoky, kinda dark and mysterious... With just that constant, four-on-the-floor house beat that just really gets bashed into your skull the whole time you're there, by the way the music makes you feel. I basically tried to capture that energy and put the Ne-Yo spin on it. And 'Closer' was the end result."

== Release ==
Ne-Yo announced his Year of the Gentleman album in late March 2008, and named "Closer" as the upcoming lead single. "Closer" was serviced to mainstream and R&B radio stations on April 8. The single entered Billboard's R&B/Hip-hop chart on April 19, 2008. It was made available for digital download on May 5, and when the album came out on June 23, "Closer" was simultaneously released as a retail CD single.

== Chart performance ==
"Closer" peaked at number seven on the Billboard Hot 100, becoming his seventh top ten hit on the chart. While having a relatively weak peak on Hot R&B/Hip-Hop songs for a Ne-Yo song, peaking outside of the top twenty at number 21, "Closer" instead had surprising success on Top 40 radio. After losing its bullet and falling down the charts on CHR/Top 40, suddenly the track exploded and frequently had the biggest bullet on pop radio, at times with over +1000. It has become his biggest U.S. radio hit, despite the lack of Urban airplay, becoming his first song to top the Hot 100 Airplay chart. As of August 2011, "Closer" has sold nearly 2,000,000 digital downloads in the US alone, making it Ne-Yo's best-selling song as a lead artist.

In the United Kingdom, "Closer" debuted at number 22 on the UK Singles Chart based solely on downloads. After seven weeks on the UK Singles Chart, and upon the release of the physical CD single, "Closer" climbed to the summit of the chart on June 29, 2008 – for the week ending date July 5, 2008 – becoming Ne-Yo's second number one single in Britain following "So Sick" in March 2006. "Closer" spent a total of 11 weeks in the top ten of the UK Singles Chart. In Ireland, "Closer" initially peaked at number 12 on the Irish Singles Chart for four weeks before jumping to number three. In Germany, the song peaked at number four on the German Singles Chart, becoming Ne-Yo's highest charting single there at that time. In Italy, "Closer debuted at number 37 on the Italian Singles Chart. In addition, it peaked within the top 10 or top 20 in Austria, Denmark, the Netherlands, Norway, and Switzerland.

In New Zealand, the song jumped 15 spots from number 20 to number five on the New Zealand Singles Chart and eventually reached a peak of number three on the chart. It has also been certified Platinum, with sales of over 15,000. In Australia, "Closer" debuted at number 17 on the ARIA Singles Chart before peaking at number eight on the chart, becoming Ne-Yo's second top ten single in Australia after "So Sick" in 2006.

== Music video ==
The video was filmed at Santa Clara Studios, California. It was directed by Melina Matsoukas who also directed his "Because of You" and "Do You" video. Ne-Yo wore a "gentleman-looking" suit dancing with a woman. Other shots also show him alone in the center of the spotlight being backed up with four dancers, or with a Matchless motorcycle. A number of on-set pictures from the video leaked over the Internet.

The video premiered on BET on April 25, playing every hour of the day with the last airing being at 7 pm. It features Ne-Yo performing dance moves, with lyrics from the song occasionally appearing on-screen.

The video was nominated in the "Best Dancing in a Video" category at the 2008 MTV Video Music Awards, but it lost to Pussycat Dolls's "When I Grow Up" which both songs would appear in Dance Dance Revolution Hottest Party 3 and Dance Dance Revolution X2 (PlayStation 2) a year later.

The music video on YouTube has received over 156 million views as of January 2025.

== Awards and nominations ==
"Closer" was ranked number 60 on Rolling Stone's list of the 100 Best Songs of 2008. The song was nominated for Best Male Pop Vocal Performance at the 51st Grammy Awards held in February 2009, while the Stonebridge Radio Edit was nominated for Best Remixed Recording, Non-Classical.

== Track listing ==
UK CD single

1. "Closer" – 3:54
2. "Closer" (Agent X Bassline Remix) – 5:22
3. "Closer" (Instrumental) – 3:54
4. "Closer" (Video)

== Charts ==
=== Weekly charts ===
Chart (2008–2009)	Peak position
Australia (ARIA)	8
Austria (Ö3 Austria Top 40)	9
Belgium (Ultratop 50 Flanders)	24
Belgium (Ultratop 50 Wallonia)	28
Bulgaria (BAMP)	10
Canada Hot 100 (Billboard)	19
CIS Airplay (TopHit)	5
Czech Republic Airplay (ČNS IFPI)	6
Denmark (Tracklisten)	12
Europe (European Hot 100)	4
Finland (Suomen virallinen lista)	9
France Download (SNEP)	46
Germany (GfK)	4
Hungary (Rádiós Top 40)	15
Hungary (Dance Top 40)	25
Ireland (IRMA)	3
Italy (FIMI)	10
Japan Hot 100 (Billboard)	21
Netherlands (Dutch Top 40)	12
Netherlands (Single Top 100)	10
New Zealand (Recorded Music NZ)	3
Norway (VG-lista)	17
Russia Airplay (TopHit)	5
Scottish Singles Sales (Official Charts)	1
Slovakia Airplay (ČNS IFPI)	6
Sweden (Sverigetopplistan)	40
Switzerland (Schweizer Hitparade)	17
UK Singles (Official Charts)	1
UK Hip Hop/R&B (Official Charts)	1
US Billboard Hot 100	7
US Adult Pop Airplay (Billboard)	40
US Dance Club Songs (Billboard)	1
US Dance Airplay (Billboard)	1
US Hot R&B/Hip-Hop Songs (Billboard)	21
US Pop Airplay (Billboard)	2
US Rhythmic Airplay (Billboard)	4

Chart (2022)	Peak position
Poland Airplay (ZPAV)	95

=== Year-end charts ===
Chart (2008)	Position
Australia (ARIA)	28
Austria (Ö3 Austria Top 40)	54
Belgium (Ultratop 50 Flanders)	89
Brazil (Crowley)	68
Canada (Canadian Hot 100)	44
Canada CHR/Top 40 (Billboard)	20
CIS (TopHit)	38
Europe (European Hot 100)	28
Germany (Media Control GfK)	29
Hungary (Rádiós Top 40)	81
Netherlands (Dutch Top 40)	45
Netherlands (Single Top 100)	64
New Zealand (RIANZ)	20
Russia Airplay (TopHit)	44
Switzerland (Schweizer Hitparade)	78
UK Singles (OCC)	15
UK Urban (Music Week)	4
US Billboard Hot 100	20
US Dance Club Play (Billboard)	36
US Hot Dance Airplay (Billboard)	8
US Hot R&B/Hip-Hop Songs (Billboard)	76
US Mainstream Top 40	14
US Rhythmic Airplay (Billboard)	10

Chart (2009)	Position
Brazil (Crowley)	47
CIS (TopHit)	161
Hungary (Rádiós Top 40)	53
Russia Airplay (TopHit)	122

=== Decade-end charts ===
Decade-end chart performance for "Closer"
Chart (2000–2009)	Position
CIS Airplay (TopHit)	66
Russia Airplay (TopHit)	67

== Certifications ==
Region	Certification	Certified units/sales
Australia (ARIA)	Platinum	70,000^{^}
Brazil (Pro-Música Brasil)	Platinum	60,000^{‡}
Denmark (IFPI Danmark)	Gold	7,500^{^}
Germany (BVMI)	Gold	150,000^{‡}
Japan (RIAJ) Full-length ringtone	Gold	100,000^{*}
Japan (RIAJ) PC download	Gold	100,000^{*}
New Zealand (RMNZ)	2× Platinum	60,000^{‡}
United Kingdom (BPI)	2× Platinum	1,200,000^{‡}
United States (RIAA)	Platinum	1,000,000^{*}
^{*} Sales figures based on certification alone.^{^} Shipments figures based on certification alone.^{‡} Sales+streaming figures based on certification alone.

== Release history ==
Release dates and formats for "Closer"
Region	Date	Format	Label(s)	Ref.
United States	April 8, 2008	Mainstream and Rhythmic airplay	Def Jam	

== Cover versions ==
- Las Vegas pop rock band The Higher covered the song on their June 2009 release, It's Only Natural.
- Laura White covered the song in the summer of 2009 at festivals she was playing.
- Australian Idol 2008 finalist Madam Parker covered this song on the Top 12 Idol's Idols night and was safe on the following verdict show. Parker recorded a cover for that season's Top 10 Cast Album.
- Romy Madley Croft of UK Mercury Music Prize winning band, the xx, covered the song in 2009. It was produced by UK electronic pop producers Kwes and Micachu and is featured in the two producer's collaborative mixtape – Kwesachu Mixtape Vol.1.
- Filipina actress Denise Laurel covered this song while impersonating Ne-Yo in the fourth week of Your Face Sounds Familiar (Philippines season 2).

== See also ==
- List of number-one dance singles of 2008 (U.S.)
