= Just Like Me (Jamie Foxx song) =

Single by Jamie Foxx featuring T.I.

from the album Intuition
- Released: August 19, 2008
- Genre: R&B; hip hop
- Length: 3:28 (album/single version); 2:50 (no rap version)
- Label: J
- Songwriters: Christopher Stewart; Terius Nash; Clifford Harris
- Producers: Tricky Stewart; The-Dream

Jamie Foxx singles chronology
"Please Excuse My Hands" (2008)	"Just Like Me" (2008)	"She Got Her Own" (2008)

T.I. singles chronology
"Ready for Whatever" (2008)	"Just Like Me" (2008)	"Ain't I" (2008)

"Just Like Me" is the first single from Jamie Foxx's third studio album Intuition. It features rapper T.I., who co-wrote the song with its producers, Tricky Stewart & The-Dream. This is the second collaboration between the two after "Live in the Sky" off T.I.'s fourth studio album King.

== Background ==
The song was originally written for Usher and there is a leaked version of his record.

== Song Concept ==
"Two can play that game" is the basis for this song. It tells the story of a man who has discovered his significant other's infidelities. He states that she is wrong for her actions and behavior. This would come across as a double standard because he is a "Casanova". Questions arise if his female-companion has brought her Paramour into their home and Porsche car. Also, did she allow him personal use of the vehicle. However, he admits that his mistress has been in their home. Plus, she was given permission to drive the car.

Now aware of her philandering, his female-companion's activities become apparent to him: flirting/hugging random men and romps in the back of nightclubs. Since he partakes in the same endeavors (with women), he knows that it would be hypocritical to criticize her. Still, he struggles to accept that he was a cuckold. Eventually, he comes to the realization that he and his female-companion are just alike; Hence, the title of the song, "Just Like Me".

== Music video ==
The music video was directed by Brett Ratner. It was released on November 26, 2008. The theme is Jamie Foxx engaged in a series of "anything you can do, I can do better" style contests with Taraji P. Henson. The video ranked at #73 on BET's Notarized: Top 100 Videos of 2009 countdown.

== Remix ==
The official remix is a mash-up version of Usher's first verse from his version of the song and also features Jamie Foxx's 2nd verse and T.I.'s verse from the original version.

== Charts ==
=== Weekly charts ===
Chart (2008–2009)	Peak position
Australia (ARIA)	91
New Zealand (Recorded Music NZ)	12
US Billboard Hot 100	49
US Hot R&B/Hip-Hop Songs (Billboard)	8

=== Year-end charts ===
Chart (2009)	Position
US Hot R&B/Hip-Hop Songs (Billboard)	33

== Certifications ==
Certifications for "Just Like Me"
Region	Certification	Certified units/sales
New Zealand (RMNZ)	Gold	15,000^{‡}
^{‡} Sales+streaming figures based on certification alone.

== Release history ==
Region	Date
United States	November 11, 2008
New Zealand	November 24, 2008
United Kingdom	December 28, 2008
