= I Don't Need It =

Single by Jamie Foxx featuring Timbaland

from the album Intuition
- Released: May 6, 2009
- Recorded: 2008
- Genre: R&B; pop
- Songwriters: James Fauntleroy; Tim Mosley; Jerome Harmon; James Washington
- Producers: Timbaland; Jerome Harmon

Jamie Foxx singles chronology
"Blame It" (2009)	"I Don't Need It" (2009)	"Digital Girl" (2009)

"I Don't Need It" is a song performed by R&B singer Jamie Foxx from his third studio album, Intuition. It features instrumental beats and additional vocals by Timbaland. The song was released as a radio-only single in May 2009.

== Release and chart performance ==
The single was sent to US radio on May 6, 2009. It was initially supposed to gain a full release, but failed to get one due to Jamie Foxx needing to prepare for The Blame It Tour. It peaked at number 38 on the US Billboard Hot R&B/Hip-Hop Songs chart.

== Charts ==
Chart performance for "I Don't Need It"
Chart (2009)	Peak position
US Hot R&B/Hip-Hop Songs (Billboard)	38
