= On Fire (The Higher album) =

Studio album by The Higher
- Released: March 6, 2007
- Genre: Pop rock
- Label: Epitaph

The Higher chronology
Histrionics (2005)	On Fire (2007)	It's Only Natural (2009)

Professional ratings
Review scores
Source	Rating
Allmusic	3/5 stars
AbsolutePunk.net	42%
Punknews.org	.5/5 stars
Q	3/5 stars

On Fire is the second studio album by American pop rock band The Higher, released through Epitaph Records on March 6, 2007.

The album's first single was the "Insurance?", followed by the second "Dare".

== Track listing ==
1. Insurance?
2. Guts
3. Rock My Body
4. Weapons Wired
5. Histrionics
6. Movement
7. Carly (Can Anyone Really Love Young)
8. Darkpop
9. Dare
10. 31 Floors
11. Our Movie Rules
12. Pace Yourself (Patrick Stump remix)
- (An unnamed bonus track) begins at 4:20 in track 12
