= Part of the List =

2009 song by Ne-Yo

Single by Ne-Yo

from the album Year of the Gentleman
- Released: April 7, 2009
- Genre: Pop; R&B
- Length: 4:10
- Label: Def Jam
- Songwriters: Chuck Harmony; Shaffer Smith
- Producer: Chuck Harmony

Ne-Yo singles chronology
"Knock You Down" (2009)	"Part of the List" (2009)	"Be on You" (2009)

Music video
- "Ne-Yo - Part of the List" on YouTube

"Part of the List" is a song by American recording artist Ne-Yo. It was released as the fourth single from his album Year of the Gentleman and was produced by Chuck Harmony. It was released to U.S. radio in April 2009. It is his first single to not chart at all in the UK top 200.

The song's lyrics feature Ne-Yo's running into an ex who is now engaged to someone else. Ne-Yo starts making a list of all the things he misses about her, from the style of her hair to the way she stares "right through to (his) soul."

== Music video ==
The music video for "Part of the List" was directed by Taj and features Ne-Yo inside of a music store looking through the CD collection when he meets up with his ex-girlfriend, Claire (played by model Bre Joyner). Though she is already engaged with her fiancé, Martin, she greets him warmly before she hitches on the taxi, but not before she kisses Ne-Yo. The following morning shows Claire meeting up with Ne-Yo meet up on a bridge and expresses she misses him as they catch up. They decide to spend their day in the city hanging out with each other until nightfall. Intercut in the later part of the video are flashbacks with Ne-Yo and Claire having fun to Claire and Martin in their bedroom.

As the two eat breakfast, while Martin isn't looking, Claire texts Ne-Yo saying "Baby, last night was fun.". This message was seen by Ne-Yo's current girlfriend, and an argument ensues. An irritated Ne-Yo, unable to explain his actions because of it, storms out the house and is then run over by a car while attempting to save a wandering kid. The video ends where the music video for "Mad" starts, making "Part of the List" a prelude to "Mad".

== Charts ==
Chart (2009)	Peak position
South African Singles Chart	25
US Billboard Hot R&B/Hip-Hop Songs	70

== Release history ==
Release dates and formats for "Part of the List"
Region	Date	Format	Label(s)	Ref.
United States	April 21, 2009	Mainstream airplay	Def Jam	
