= It's Only Natural (The Higher album) =

Studio album by The Higher
- Released: June 23, 2009
- Genre: Power pop, pop rock
- Length: 45:15
- Label: Epitaph

The Higher chronology
On Fire (2007)	It's Only Natural (2009)

Professional ratings
Review scores
Source	Rating
AbsolutePunk	74%
Blogcritics	3.5/5 stars
Allmusic	3/5 stars
Punknews.org	.5/5 stars

It's Only Natural is the third studio album by American pop rock band The Higher, released on June 23, 2009.

== Track listing ==
1. "Try Again" – 3:31
2. "Other Options" – 3:35
3. "Undertaker" – 3:01
4. "It's Only Natural" – 3:15
5. "Story of a Man Obsessed" – 3:12
6. "The (Runaway) Artist" – 3:42
7. "Play with Fire" – 3:39
8. "Burn and Turn" – 3:01
9. "The Black Dress" – 3:29
10. "Beautiful Coffin" – 3:49
11. "Scandalous" – 7:04
12. "Closer" (Ne-Yo cover) – 4:04

=== Bonus tracks ===
13. "Sound the Retreat" (iTunes bonus track)
