= Intuition (Jamie Foxx album) =

Studio album by Jamie Foxx
- Released: December 16, 2008
- Length: 63:29
- Labels: Jamie Breyon; J
- Producers: Just Blaze; Butter Beats; Calvo da Gr8; Blac Elvis; Jamie Foxx; Christopher "Deep" Henderson; J-New; J-Roc; Jim Jonsin; Los da Mystro; Poke & Tone; Salaam Remi; Tank; Tricky Stewart; The-Dream; Timbaland

Jamie Foxx chronology
Unpredictable (2005)	Intuition (2008)	Best Night of My Life (2010)

Singles from Intuition
- 1. "Just Like Me" Released: August 19, 2008; 2. "She Got Her Own" Released: December 14, 2008; 3. "Blame It" Released: January 26, 2009; 4. "I Don't Need It" Released: May 6, 2009; 5. "Digital Girl" Released: July 17, 2009

Intuition is the third studio album by American R&B singer and actor Jamie Foxx. It was released on December 16, 2008, by Jamie Breyon Entertainment and J Records.

The album features several guest artists, including T.I., Lil Wayne, Ne-Yo, Kanye West, Fabolous, T-Pain, The-Dream, Lil' Kim, Timbaland and Marsha Ambrosius. The album debuted at number three on the US Billboard 200 chart, selling 265,000 copies in the first week. The album was certified platinum by the Recording Industry Association of America (RIAA).

== Background and composition ==
In December 2005, J Records released Foxx' second studio album Unpredictable. Recorded between 2004 and 2005, with production from Timbaland, Sean Garrett, and others, it served as the artist's first studio release in eleven years, following his largely self-produced 1994 debut, Peep This. While the album received mixed reviews upon release, it debuted at number two on the US Billboard 200, selling 597,000 copies in its first week, later reaching number one and earning double platinum certification from the Recording Industry Association of America (RIAA). Ultimately selling nearly two million units domestically, it was supported by four singles: "Extravaganza" featuring Kanye West, the title track featuring Ludacris, "DJ Play a Love Song" featuring Twista, and "Can I Take U Home."

Work on a follow-up to Unpredictable began in 2006, with Foxx spending the better part of the following two years writing and recording new material. While Unpredictable had focused largely on slow, intimate tracks, Foxx found it challenging to keep the audience engaged while performing them. In contrast, he was looking for more energetic, club-ready songs with an international appeal and faster tempos for Intuition. According to Foxx, the lyrics of Intuition center on exploring the desires and expectations of the opposite sex, telling BET: "On my radio show, I have this panel of beautiful women and they were talking about how men with a lot of money aren't all that. But if a guy has no money, that's no good either. So I was thinking, What does a woman want? We go from there and build the story and the songs."

== Promotion ==
=== Singles ===
"Blame It"
Jamie Foxx featuring T-Pain's "Blame It" from Intuition

"She Got Her Own" (Miss Independent Part 2)
Ne-Yo, Fabolous & Jamie Foxx' "She Got Her Own" (Miss Independent Part 2) from Intuition & Year of the Gentleman (Japan Edition)

The album's lead single "Just Like Me" featuring T.I., was released on August 19, 2008. The song debuted at number 48 on the Billboard Hot R&B/Hip-Hop Songs chart, before it reached the top 10. It also peaked at number 49 on the Billboard 100. The remix to Ne-Yo's "Miss Independent," titled "She Got Her Own" featuring Ne-Yo; along with an American rapper Fabolous, which was released as the album's second single on December 14, 2008.

The album's third single "Blame It" featuring T-Pain, was released on January 26, 2009. In its first week, "Just Like Me", "Blame It" and "She Got Her Own" were charted on the top-ten in the Billboard Hot R&B/Hip-Hop Songs at numbers 8, 1, and 2, respectively. While on the Conan O'Brien show, Foxx performed the remix to "Digital Girl" featuring Canadian rapper Drake, during the interview with MTV News, as he stated; it will be his fourth single from Intuition. The full studio version was leaked and officially released on June 19, 2009, which features guest appearances from Drake, adding Kanye West and The-Dream on this track.

=== Tour ===
In May 2009, Foxx announced he was going on tour in the support of his third album Intuition. The 40-city tour kicked off on July 2 in Anaheim and ended in October.

==== Tour dates ====
Date	City	Country	Venue
North America
July 2, 2009	Anaheim	United States	The Grove of Anaheim
July 3, 2009	Las Vegas	United States	The Joint
July 4, 2009	Las Vegas	United States	The Joint
July 9, 2009	Tulsa	United States	BOK Center
July 10, 2009	Houston	United States	Reliant Arena
July 11, 2009	Austin	United States	Frank Erwin Center
July 12, 2009	Oklahoma City	United States	Cox Convention Center
July 16, 2009	Indianapolis	United States	Murat Theatre
July 17, 2009	Memphis	United States	FedEx Forum
July 18, 2009	Nashville	United States	Sommet Center
July 19, 2009	Greensboro	United States	Greensboro Coliseum
July 23, 2009	Minneapolis	United States	Target Center
July 24, 2009	St. Louis	United States	Chaifetz Arena
July 25, 2009	Kansas City	United States	Sprint Center
July 26, 2009	Louisville	United States	Freedom Hall
July 30, 2009	Milwaukee	United States	Milwaukee Theatre
July 31, 2009	Merrillville	United States	Star Plaza Theatre
August 1, 2009	Chicago	United States	Arie Crown Theatre
August 2, 2009	Chicago	United States	Arie Crown Theatre
August 6, 2009	Detroit	United States	Fox Theatre
August 9, 2009	Rochester	United States	Blue Cross Arena
August 11, 2009	Toronto	Canada	Sound Academy
August 13, 2009	Dayton	United States	Nutter Center
August 14, 2009	Columbus, Ohio	United States	Veterans Memorial Auditorium
August 15, 2009	Cincinnati	United States	US Bank Arena
August 16, 2009	Cleveland	United States	Wolstein Center
August 20, 2009	Boston	United States	Bank of America Pavilion
August 21, 2009	Uncasville	United States	Mohegan Sun
August 22, 2009	Albany	United States	Times Union Center
August 23, 2009	Richmond	United States	Richmond Coliseum
August 27, 2009	New Orleans	United States	New Orleans Arena
August 28, 2009	Jacksonville	United States	Jacksonville Veterans Memorial Arena
August 29, 2009	Sunrise	United States	BankAtlantic Center
August 30, 2009	Orlando	United States	Amway Arena
September 3, 2009	Greenville	United States	BI-LO Center
September 4, 2009	Birmingham	United States	Boutwell Auditorium
September 5, 2009	Atlanta	United States	Chastain Park
September 6, 2009	Atlanta	United States	Chastain Park
September 13, 2009	Philadelphia	United States	Tower Theater
September 17, 2009	Hampton	United States	Hampton Coliseum
September 18, 2009	Columbia	United States	Colonial Center
September 20, 2009	North Charleston	United States	North Charleston Coliseum
September 25, 2009	Dallas	United States	Nokia Theatre at Grand Prairie
September 27, 2009	San Antonio	United States	AT&T Center
October 1, 2009	Phoenix	United States	Dodge Theatre
October 3, 2009	San Diego	United States	San Diego Civic Theatre
October 4, 2009	Fresno	United States	William Saroyan Theatre
October 8, 2009	Seattle	United States	KeyArena
October 9, 2009	Las Vegas	United States	The Colosseum at Caesars Palace
October 10, 2009	Concord	United States	Sleep Train Pavilion
October 15, 2009	Sacramento	United States	ARCO Arena
October 16, 2009	Los Angeles	United States	L.A. Live
October 17, 2009	Los Angeles	United States	L.A. Live

== Critical reception ==
Professional ratings
Aggregate scores
Source	Rating
Metacritic	56/100
Review scores
Source	Rating
AllMusic	3/5 stars
Artistdirect	3.5/5 stars
Robert Christgau	(choice cut)
DJBooth	3.5/5 stars
HipHopDX	2.5/5
Los Angeles Times	2/4 stars
musicOMH	1/5 stars
Yahoo! Music UK	5/10 stars
USA Today	2.5/4 stars

Intuition received mixed reviews from music critics. At Metacritic, which assigns a normalized rating out of 100 to reviews from critics, the album received an average score of 56, which indicates "mixed or average reviews", based on 6 reviews.

Sarah Rodman of The Boston Globe reviewed the album positively, stating: "Like many contemporary R&B albums, the cameos sometimes crowd the main attraction, but Foxx is wise enough to intuit when it suits him best to share the spotlight." AllMusic editor Andy Kellman felt that while Intuition was "star-studded" as Foxx' previous album, its "collection of collaborators and producers [made] it appear more like a release from a singer in his twenties rather than early forties [...] If not quite as enjoyable as Unpredictable, Foxx's ability and personality make it easy to ride out the sags." USA Today's Ken Barnes wrote that Foxx "smoothly croons his way through several romantic entanglements with women of varying sincerity. This has worked for Foxx before, and his intuition is probably right that it will work again." Billboard found wrote: "Sporting production by Chris "Tricky" Stewart, Terius "The-Dream" Nash and Timbaland, Intuition contains additional assists from the usual suspects on songs mirroring the formulaic vein of most contemporary R&B and pop. But it's during the album’s romantic second half that Foxx winningly struts his stuff. He channels Marvin Gaye on the melodic "I Don’t Know," then steams up the proceedings on the sexy duet "Freak'in Me" with Marsha Ambrosius."

Vibe's Claire Lobenfeld had a mixed review for the album, stating: "What is missing from Intuition is a balance between the party records and the slow jams. The division displays a lack of cohesiveness that separates the effort from being a great album into just a collection of potential singles." HipHopDX's Kevin Gary concluded that "Foxx will have a career for decades as one of Hollywood’s leading men but it’s to be wondered how long he will be able to release albums that work better as a showcase for others than for him. Perhaps the lesson is it’s better to be great at one thing then just okay at several." Nate Chinen, writing for The New York Times, found that "Foxx knows his way around a star vehicle, and he knows how to work with an ensemble. And yet on Intuition, his third album as an ersatz R&B singer, he keeps confusing the two. The album's parade of guest stars seems intended to flaunt Mr. Foxx's clout and charm. It never manages to make a greater case for his talent." Similarly, Talia Kraines from BBC Music felt the trouble was "that the guests are far more interesting than the star himself, leaving Jamie often faltering when left on his own. Adding soul to "I Don't Know" and Timbaland's gritty productions on the grinding"I Don't Need It" helps solve that problem but without killer beats behind him all the way, Intuition sounds like an album lacking that essential bite." Emily Heward of musicOMH was less impressed with the album. She noted that the song on Intuition were "lost amidst over-enthusiastic vocal effects" and that "it is hard to recognize the soulful voice that landed him his Oscar."

== Commercial performance ==
Intuition debuted at number three on the US Billboard 200, selling 265,000 copies in the first week. This became Foxx's second US top-ten album. In its second week, the album dropped to number nine on the chart, selling an additional 105,000 copies. In its third week, the album climbed to number eight on the chart, selling 45,000 more copies. In its fourth week, the album remained at number eight on the chart, selling 34,000 copies, bringing its four-week total to 449,000 copies. On May 12, 2009, the album was certified platinum by the Recording Industry Association of America (RIAA) for sales of over one million copies in the United States.

== Track listing ==
Intuition track listing
No.	Title	Writer(s)	Producer(s)	Length
1.	"Just Like Me" (featuring T.I.)	Christopher Stewart; Terius Nash; Clifford Harris Jr.	Tricky Stewart; The-Dream; Kuk Harrell^{[a]}	3:28
2.	"I Don't Need It" (featuring Timbaland)	Timothy Mosley; James Fauntleroy; James Washington; Jerome "J-Roc" Harmon	Timbaland; J-Roc; Jim Beanz^{[a]}	3:58
3.	"Number One" (featuring Lil Wayne)	Justin Smith; Marsha Ambrosius; Dwayne Carter, Jr.; Michael Diamond; Adam Horovitz; Rick Rubin; Adam Yauch	Just Blaze; Ambrosius^{[a]}	5:02
4.	"Digital Girl" (featuring Kanye West and The-Dream)	Stewart; Nash; Carter Jr.; Kanye West; Faheem Najm; David Balfour; Evan Wilson	Stewart; The-Dream; Harrell^{[a]}	4:47
5.	"Blame It" (featuring T-Pain)	Jamie Foxx; Christopher "Deep" Henderson; Nathan Walker; James Brown; Brandon Melanchon, John Conte, Jr.; Najm; Breyon Prescott	Henderson	4:50
6.	"She Got Her Own" (with Ne-Yo and Fabolous)	Shaffer Smith; John Jackson; David Brown; Antonio Jimenez; Donna Summer	Butter Beats	5:32
7.	"Intuition (Interlude)"	Foxx; Carlos McKinney	Los da Mystro	1:46
8.	"I Don't Know"	Salaam Remi; Rico Love; Arthur Ross; Leon Ware; Steve Boone; Mark Sebastian; John Sebastian; Tre Hardson; Derrick Stewart; Emandu Wilcox; John Martinez; Romye Robinson	Remi; Staybent Krunk-a-Delic^{[b]}; Love^{[a]}	3:23
9.	"Weekend Lover"	Calvin "Calvo da Gr8" Kenon; Love	Kenon; Love^{[a]}	4:13
10.	"Why"	Stewart; Nash	Stewart; The-Dream; Harrell^{[a]}	4:53
11.	"Freak'in Me" (featuring Marsha Ambrosius)	Foxx; Elvis Williams; Jamie Newman; Prescott; Ambrosius	Blac Elvis; J-New; Ambrosius^{[a]}	3:46
12.	"Slow"	Stewart; Nash	Stewart; The-Dream; Harrell^{[a]}	5:42
13.	"Rainman"	Stewart; Nash	Stewart; The-Dream; Harrell^{[a]}	3:55
14.	"Overdose"	Foxx; Durrell Babbs; Lonny Bereal; Jason Bonner	Tank	4:09
15.	"Love Brings Change"	Foxx; Celester Burwel; Bereal	Foxx	4:05
Total length:				63:29

iTunes bonus track
No.	Title	Writer(s)	Producer(s)	Length
16.	"Cover Girl" (featuring Lil' Kim)	Jean-Claude Olivier; Samuel Barnes; Kimberly Jones; Theo Bowen; April Williams; Aharon Grimes; April Williams; Janet Sewell-Ulepic	Poke & Tone	3:56
Total length:				67:25

United Kingdom bonus track
No.	Title	Writer(s)	Producer(s)	Length
17.	"Street Walker"	Mosley; Fauntleroy; Washington; Harmon	Timbaland; J-Roc; Beanz^{[a]}	4:24
Total length:				67:53

Notes

- ^{^[a]} signifies vocal producer(s)
- ^{^[b]} signifies assistant producer(s)

Sample credits

- "Number One" contains a sample from "The New Style" performed by Beastie Boys.
- "Digital Girl" contains re-sung lyrics from "Can't Believe It" performed by T-Pain and Lil Wayne.
- "She Got Her Own" contains a sample from "My Baby Understands" performed by Donna Summer.
- "I Don't Know" contains re-sung lyrics from "Passin' Me By" performed by The Pharcyde, from which in turn samples the Quincy Jones version of "Summer in the City," and also contains a portion of the composition "I Want You" performed by Marvin Gaye.

== Personnel ==
Credits are adapted from Allmusic and the album's Liner Notes.

- Jamie Foxx – lead vocals (All tracks), background vocals (2)
- Kory Aaron – mixing assistant (4, 8, 10–13)
- Jim Beanz – background vocals (2)
- Andre Bowman – bass played by (10)
- Demacio Castellon – audio mixing (2)
- Kevin "KD" Davis – audio mixing (6)
- Doug Fenske – recording engineer (11), assistant engineer (9)
- Jason Fleming – recording engineer
- Chris Godbey – recording engineer, audio mixing (2)
- Noel Gourdin – background vocals (8)
- Casey Graham – recording engineer
- Mark Gray – instrumental recording engineer (12)
- Jaymz Hardy-Martin III – vocal recording engineer
- Kuk Harrell – background vocals (10), vocal recording engineer (1, 4, 10, 12–13)
- Christopher "Deep" Henderson – background vocals, drum machine, instruments played by, recording engineer (5)
- John Horesco IV – vocal recording engineer
- Antonio Jimenez – recording engineer (6)
- Brandon Jones – mixing assistant (2)
- Jaycen Joshua – audio mixing (1, 3–5, 7–15)
- Sean K – music programming (4, 10), instrumental recording engineer (12)
- Rico Love – additional vocals (9)
- Phil Margaziotis – recording engineer (9)
- Brandon R. Melanchon – background vocals (5)
- Chris "Tek" O'Ryan – instrumental recording engineer (4, 12)
- Dave Pensado – audio mixing (1, 3–5, 7–15)
- DeMonica Plummer – sample clearance agent
- Orlando Rashid – recording engineer (15)
- Salaam Remi – musical arrangements, Fender Rhodes keyboard, drums, bass played by (8)
- D. P. Samuels – mixing assistant (11)
- Franklin Emmanuel Socorro – recording engineer (8)
- Staybent Krunk-a-Delic – background vocals, additional keyboards (8)
- Tank – instruments performed by (14)
- Brian "B-Luv" Thomas – instrumental recording engineer (4, 10, 13)
- Pat Thrall – recording engineer (additional on 1, instrumental on 4, 10, 13)
- Randy Urbanski – mixing assistant (1, 3, 7, 9–10, 14–15)
- Julian Vasquez – recording engineer (2)
- Wizard – keyboards (10)
- Andrew Wright – recording engineer, audio mixing (3)
- Andrew Wuepper – mixing assistant (1, 7, 9–10, 14–15)
- Jordan "DJ Swivel" Young – recording engineer (6)

== Charts ==
=== Weekly charts ===
Weekly chart performance for Intuition
Chart (2008–09)	Peak position
UK R&B Albums (Official Charts)	21
US Billboard 200	3
US Top R&B/Hip-Hop Albums (Billboard)	1

=== Year-end charts ===
Year-end chart performance for Intuition
Chart (2009)	Position
US Billboard 200	17
US Top R&B/Hip-Hop Albums (Billboard)	2

== Certifications ==
Certifications for Intuition
Region	Certification	Certified units/sales
United States (RIAA)	Platinum	1,000,000^{^}
^{^} Shipments figures based on certification alone.

== Release history ==
Release formats for Intuition
Region	Date	Label
United States	December 16, 2008	J Records
Canada	December 16, 2008	J Records
Europe	December 16, 2008	J Records
United Kingdom	January 12, 2009	J Records
