= Mad (song) =

2008 single by Ne-Yo

Single by Ne-Yo

from the album Year of the Gentleman
- Released: November 17, 2008
- Genre: Pop; R&B
- Length: 4:14
- Label: Def Jam
- Songwriters: Mikkel S. Eriksen; Tor Erik Hermansen; Shaffer Smith
- Producers: Stargate; Ne-Yo

Ne-Yo singles chronology
"Camera Phone" (2008)	"Mad" (2008)	"Knock You Down" (2009)

Music video
- "Ne-Yo - Mad" on YouTube

"Mad" is a song by American singer-songwriter Ne-Yo. It was released as the third single from his third studio album, Year of the Gentleman (2008), and was produced by Stargate and himself.

== Music video ==
The video for the song was directed by Diane Martel. It premiered on AOL on November 25, 2008. The video, shot in black and white, presents a narrative wherein Ne-Yo argues with his girlfriend (played by Faune Chambers). After leaving, in an attempt to save a child from a car accident, someone is fatally hit. At the end of the video, it is revealed that the whole time it has been the ghost of Ne-Yo's character singing, and that it was he who was killed. The video to this song is a sequel of his song "Part of the List", which was released as this album's fourth single in April 2009.

The music video appears to mirror the 1999 American thriller The Sixth Sense from M. Night Shyamalan, in which Bruce Willis plays a psychologist who is shot by an estranged patient of his (played by Donnie Wahlberg). Based on how the film was shot and portrayed, Bruce Willis is shown in many situations as if he is there physically, when in actuality he was murdered by his patient, just as how Ne-Yo appears with his girlfriend, seeming to be there physically and that she is ignoring him due to their earlier argument, when he is actually dead.

The video ranked at number 63 on BET's Notarized: Top 100 Videos of 2009 countdown.

== Chart performance ==
"Mad" debuted at number 97 on the Billboard Hot 100 and peaked at number 11. It reached the top ten of the Hot R&B/Hip-Hop Songs, peaking at number 5. On the UK Singles Chart, it reached number 19, giving Ne-Yo his third top 20 hit from the Year of the Gentleman album, and his sixth overall. Despite only peaking at number 19, "Mad" spent four more weeks than his number one hit "So Sick" inside the UK top 100. It also debuted on the Canadian Hot 100 at number 93 and rose to a high of 23.

== Charts ==
=== Weekly charts ===
Chart (2009)	Position
Australia (ARIA)	82
Canada Hot 100 (Billboard)	23
European Hot 100 Singles (Billboard)	58
Ireland (IRMA)	30
New Zealand (Recorded Music NZ)	5
Romania (Music & Media)	45
Sweden (Sverigetopplistan)	57
UK Singles (Official Charts)	19
UK Hip Hop/R&B (Official Charts)	3
US Billboard Hot 100	11
US Hot R&B/Hip-Hop Songs (Billboard)	5
US Pop Airplay (Billboard)	11
US Rhythmic Airplay (Billboard)	3

=== Monthly charts ===
Chart (2009)	Peak position
Brazil (Brasil Hot 100 Airplay)	10
Brazil (Brasil Hot Pop Songs)	6

=== Year-end charts ===
Chart (2009)	Position
Brazil (Crowley)	2
Canada (Canadian Hot 100)	86
UK Singles (OCC)	151
US Billboard Hot 100	42
US Hot R&B/Hip-Hop Songs (Billboard)	15
US Rhythmic Airplay (Billboard)	13

== Certifications ==
Region	Certification	Certified units/sales
Brazil (Pro-Música Brasil)	2× Platinum	120,000^{‡}
New Zealand (RMNZ)	2× Platinum	60,000^{‡}
United Kingdom (BPI)	Platinum	600,000^{‡}
United States (RIAA)	Platinum	1,000,000^{*}
^{*} Sales figures based on certification alone.^{‡} Sales+streaming figures based on certification alone.
