= Nate Walka =

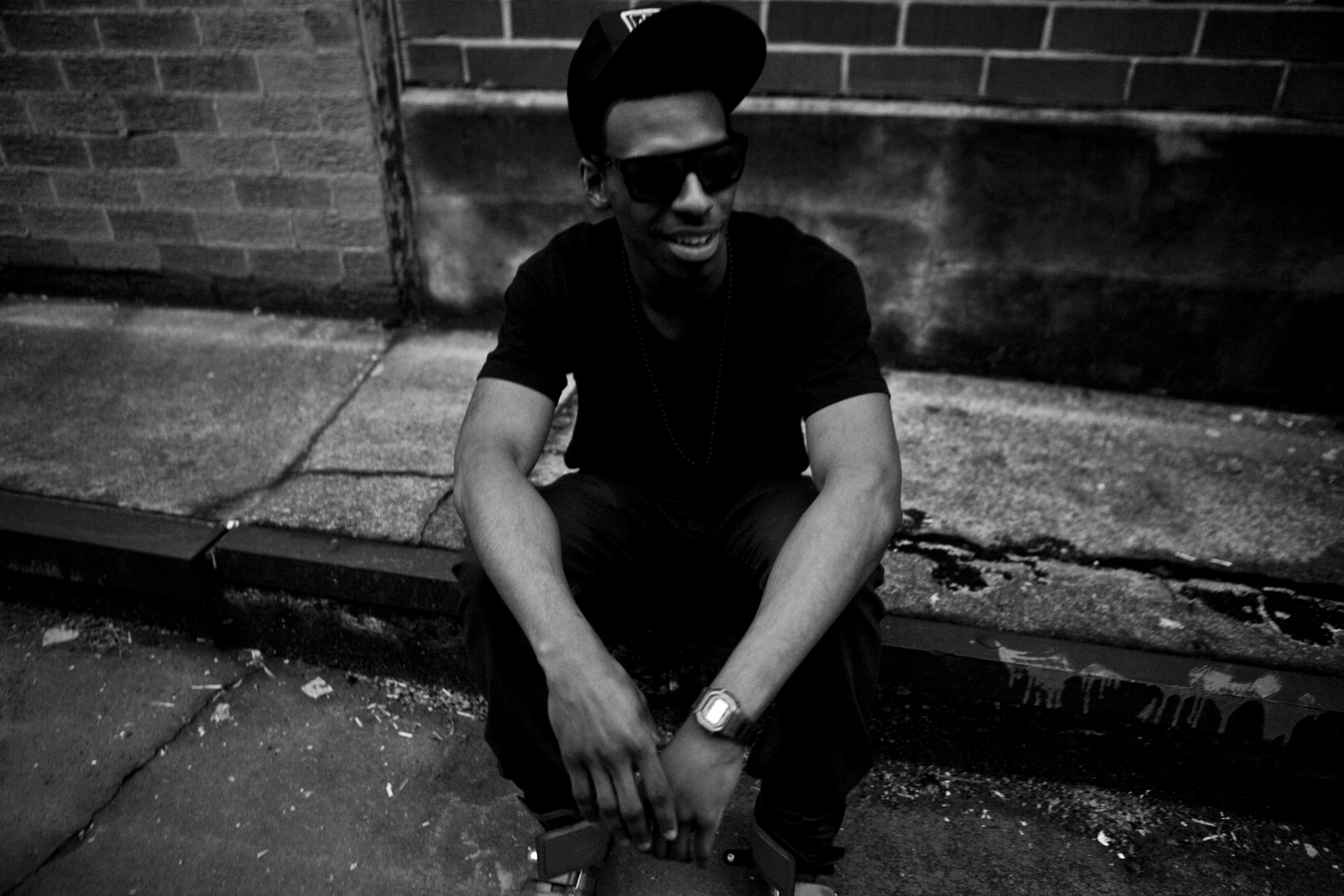

Background information
- Born: Nathan L. Walker; June 25, 1986 (age 39); Memphis, Tennessee, United States
- Genres: Hip Hop; pop; electro; rock; alternative
- Occupations: Singer-songwriter; record producer
- Years active: 2007–present
- Label: Versatile Music Group

Nathan L. Walker, better known by his stage name Nate Walka, is an American recording artist, Grammy Award winning songwriter, music producer and vocal producer based in Atlanta, Georgia.

== Early life ==
Nathan L. Walker was born on June 25, 1986, in the community of Whitehaven in Memphis TN, with his older sister Shimura. His mother Cheri Denise Akins worked in real estate and was a professional artist specifically working in abstract portraits and photography. His father, Larry Walker worked as visual artists and drew personal portraits. His parents divorced when he was three years old.

As a child, Walker grew up in an artistic and musical household and sang gospel songs in choir, his uncle a baritone and his sister an alto. At an early age, Walker began developing a passion for writing. His mother mistook his songs for poetry and entered him into literary competitions, winning several international poetry competitions. From very early on, Walker was showing signs of becoming a talented and multi-faceted artist.

Walker attended Whitehaven High School. He later transferred to Overton High in the middle of 10th grade before moving to Warren Township High in Illinois to complete his studies, receive his high school diploma and finish out the school year. During this time, Walker worked on his music and sold CDs in high school and other local high schools, he accumulated $7,000 in a single semester.

=== College and battle rapping ===
In 2004 Walker found himself in Alabama. He enrolled in Alabama AM, to study business marketing with the intention of pursuing a career in marketing, however he soon realized, after his junior year at around 20 years old, that this was not for him.

In college Walker’s reputation grew in battle rapping. He won the Xbox 360 battling competition in 2006 and won the Boost Mobile battle rap competition in the same year. Walker also took part in several talent shows at school and the local surrounding areas to gain experience on stage and to increase his profile.

In 2007 in his junior year, Walker dropped out of college and moved to Carmel Indiana to help his sister who had just given birth to Nate's first niece Cherra. Nate got a job in clothing retail and worked for almost a year, he soon realized that he was falling into the 9-5 trap and was getting off course, so made a conscious decision to move once again, but this time to Atlanta.

=== Move to Atlanta ===
Walker slept on the living room floor of his high school friend's apartment. He spent most of his time writing and recording. He started selling CDs again to make a living. It was during this time where he met Askia Fountain (Timeless Entertainment). Fountain was immediately impressed with Walker’s sound and became his manager on the spot.

== Music career ==
=== Mixtapes ===
While in Atlanta, Walker immediately began working on tracks for his first mixtape NateObama, presented by DJ Shakim (Superfriends) with production by David Ballard. NateObama showcased Walker’s free styling abilities. In Spring 2009 Walker released his follow up mixtape The Inauguration hosted by Don Cannon and DJ Knuckles. The electro hip-hop sound showcased Walker’s lyricism and sense of humor.

=== Touring ===
From the success of his two mixtapes, Walker joined MTV’s Buzzin’ reality TV star, Shwayze on tour. He was initially signed up to open for Shwayze for just one performance, however his response from the crowd was so well received, that Shwayze and his team asked him to continue on as the opener for an additional 30+ cities. During this time, Walker secured his first placement with “Blame It” on Jamie Foxx’s Intuition LP.

=== "Blame It" ===
In the midst of working on his mixtapes, Walker began working on the Grammy Award winning song “Blame It”. The idea for the song came about when Walker was on the phone to his grandmother who was complaining about his uncle. “That’s when the idea of the song came to me,” said Walker, “it was so obvious, it was a cool concept. I started Googling to see if anyone had come up with a song about this, and didn’t find anything, so came up with the hook and the rest just unfolded.” For fourteen weeks, “Blame It” performed by Jamie Foxx featuring T-Pain held the #1 position, and broke national records, replacing Beyoncé's “Single Ladies”. It was also awarded ASCAP's Rhythm & Soul Music Award for Song of the Year.

=== Grammy win ===
The success of “Blame It” Garnered Walker 3 Grammy nominations: Best Contemporary R&B Album (Intuition, Jamie Foxx), Best R&B Song ("Blame It", Jamie Foxx), Best R&B Performance by a Duo or Group with Vocals ("Blame It", Jamie Foxx featuring T-Pain) and 1 nomination for Best Rap Performance by a Duo or Group ("Make Her Say", Kid Cudi featuring Kanye West & Common).

Walker continued to chart singles landing another placement, penning, “Say Aah” for R&B artist, Trey Songz’s Ready LP. “Say Aah” peaked at #3 on the Billboard Charts and reached Double Platinum Status, becoming Songz’s first ever single to do so. He also received his fifth Grammy Nomination for Best Contemporary R&B Album ("Ready", Trey Songz).

== Present ==
Nate is currently working with Justine Skye on her upcoming 2020 release & Chinese superstar Jackson Wang. Nate is currently signed to Ultra Publishing.

== Discography ==
- “We Are All a Little Crazy” – MCTB (Matteo called the Butrags)
- “Blame It” – Jamie Foxx featuring T-Pain
- “Make Her Say” – Kid Cudi featuring Kanye West & Common
- “Say Aah” – Trey Songz
- "Live My Life" - Far East Movement featuring Justin Bieber
- "Live my Life remix" - Far East Movement Featuring LMFAO & Justin Bieber
- "Break Ya Back" - Timbaland featuring DEV
- "Middle Finger" - Cobra Starship featuring Mac Miller
- “Have It All” – Jesse McCartney
- "JELLO" - Far East Movement featuring RYE RYE
- "What i Be On" - Trey Songz featuring Fabolous
- "Drummer Boy" - Alesha Dixon
- "Baddest Chick" - Alesha Dixon
- "Tug o' War - Alesha Dixon
- "Can't Stop" - The Thrillers featuring Nate Walka
- “Rep My City” - DJ Khaled ft. Pitbull & Jarvis
- “Believer” - Bizarre (D12) featuring Tech N9ne
- "Wine Pon It" - Marley Waters
- "Wine Pon it Afro Remix" Marley Waters featuring Kranium, Stone Bwoy & Massicka
- "Pull Up Szn" - Marley Waters featuring Dab & Nargo
- "Over Being Sober" - Nate Walka, Machine Gun Kelly, Mat Musto, Kyle Lucas
- "Racking Up" - Colette Carr
- "HAM" - Colette Carr featuring Ben J of the New Boyz
- "Get Up Rattle" - Far East Movement featuring Ministry of Sound
- "Linda" - Emis Killa
- "Storey" - MadMan
- "Anticipation" - Justine Skye featuring Kranium
- "What i be on" Trey Songz featuring Fabolous
- "AND1" - Trey Songz featuring O.T. Genesis
- "Aint Coming Down" - Far East Movement featuring Sidney Samson & Matthew Koma
- "If i die tomorrow" - Far East Movement featuring Bill Kaulitz
- "Flossy" - Far East Movement featuring My Name Is Kay
- "Where the Wild Things Are" Far East Movement Featuring Crystal Kay
- "Dirty Bass" - Far East Movement featuring Tyga
- "Murder The Dance Floor" - Erick Morillo & Konshens featuring Sympho Nympho
- "Live Loud" - Asia Bryant
- "Middle Finger" - Cobra Starship featuring Mac Miller
- "Scream My Name" - N-Dubz
- "Money" O.T. Genesis ft Snoop Dogg
- "About Last Night" featuring Beenie Man, Da Professor & Marley Waters
- "Top of the World" - Alesha Dixon

== Awards, Nominations ==
Year	Award	Result
2011	Song of the Year ASCAP Awards. “Say AAH”	Won
2010	Best Collaboration with T-Pain: BET Awards. “Blame It”	Won
2010	2010 Best R&B Performance by Duo/Group: Grammy Awards. “Blame It”	Won
2009	Record of the Year: Soul Train Music Awards. “Blame It”	Won
2010	Best R&B Song: Grammy Awards “Blame It”	Nominated
2010	Best Contemporary R&B Album (Intuition)	Nominated
2009	Video of the Year: BET Awards. “Blame It”	Nominated
2009	Album of the Year: Soul Train Music Awards (Intuition)	Nominated
