= The Higher =

American band

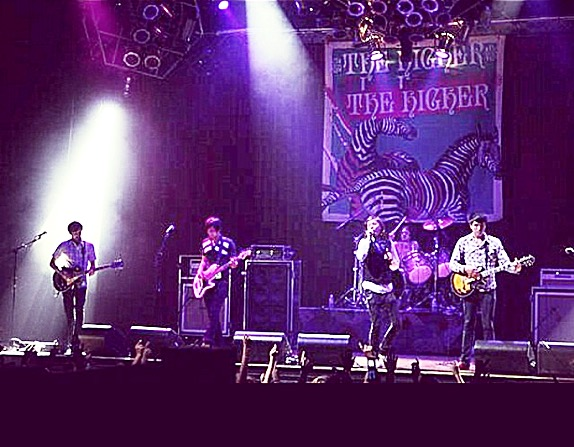
- The Higher performing at the House of Blues, Las Vegas

Background information
- Origin: Las Vegas, Nevada, U.S.
- Genres: Pop punk, emo, pop rock
- Years active: 2002–Present
- Labels: Fiddler, Epitaph, Sony
- Members: Seth Trotter; Robert “Reggie” Ragan; George Lind
- Past members: Tom Oakes; Jason "Face" Centeno; Patrick Harter; James Mattison; Doug "Duug Fresh" McCarthy; Andrew "The Kidd" Evans

The Higher is an American pop rock band from Las Vegas, Nevada. They were originally known as "September Star". They have released three full-length albums, On Fire, It's Only Natural, and Histrionics, and EPs named "Pace Yourself" and "Star is Dead." The band was signed to Fiddler Records, Epitaph Records, and Sony Japan. The Higher toured with the bands Panic! at the Disco, Motion City Soundtrack, The Temper Trap, Less Than Jake, Ludo, Escape the Fate, Silverstein, Emery, Alexisonfire, There For Tomorrow, We The Kings, Rookie of the Year, The Matches, Sherwood, Meg and Dia, Quiet Drive, Take Cover, I Am Ghost, The Forecast, This Providence, Name Taken, Sing it Loud, Runner Runner, Rufio and others.

== History ==
=== 2002–2005: Early years ===
The Higher ( originally September Star) formed in 2001. The original line up included Tom Oakes, Seth Trotter, Jason Centeno, James Mattison, and Pat Harter. In 2002, after gaining notoriety in the Vegas local music scene, The Higher began to receive attention from various labels and signed with Fiddler Records. In early 2003, they released their "Star is Dead" EP for Fiddler produced by Beau Burchell (Saosin). Gaining momentum the band got on their first major tour, opening for Alexisonfire, Silverstein, and Emery. August 2004 saw the band enter the studio with producer Rory Phillips (Young Love, Recover) to begin work on their 1st full-length album for Fiddler. In May 2005, they released "Histrionics." It would turn out to be their last release on Fiddler Records as the label went defunct leaving the band as free agents. In June 2005, guitarist James Mattison left the band for personal reasons. Needing a guitarist, Robert "Reggie" Ragan was auditioned and would join the band permanently in July 2005.

=== 2005–2008: On Fire ===
In late 2005 after touring with Panic! At the Disco, they received interest from several record labels, ultimately signing with Epitaph Records in early 2006. In the summer of 2006 they hit the studio with producer Mike Green (Paramore, Good Charlotte), to begin work on their first full length for Epitaph. Patrick Stump of Fall Out Boy remixed the song "Pace Yourself" for the record. Upon its completion, they began the Epitaph Tour, touring with bands Escape the Fate, The Matches, and I am Ghost. "On Fire" was released March 6, 2007. The lead single "Insurance?" immediately put the band on the map both domestically and internationally. Their music video for "Insurance?" from On Fire received heavy rotation on college-oriented video programming, such as MTVu. The video was shot in Las Vegas at the now imploded Frontier Hotel and Casino, and features the band performing and playing casino games with dancers. During the Summer of 2007, the video received airtime on MTV2, and was the #1 video on Fuse for two consecutive weeks. The band then hit the road with Motion City Soundtrack, Sherwood, and The Forecast for a three-month run of shows. Later on that year, the band signed to Sony Japan. Their video for "Insurance?" hit #1 on MTV Japan beating out Rihanna for the top spot. "On Fire" also broke into Japan's top 10 Billboard charts, landing at #8. October 2007 saw the bands first lineup shake up. Original drummer Pat Harter and the band agreed to mutually part ways. In November 2007, the band completed their first tour of Japan, selling out every show.

=== 2008–2012: It's Only Natural and Lineup Changes ===
In February 2008, original guitarist Tom Oakes left the band to start a new project called More Amor. In April 2008, The Higher completed their first-ever UK Tour, supporting Elliot Minor for nine dates alongside openers Furthest Drive Home. They also completed their first Van's Warped Tour, playing the Smart Punk stage alongside such acts as Katy Perry and Forever the Sickest Kids. Following the completion of Warped Tour they began working on their second full-length album for Epitaph Records. Again, they called upon Mike Green for production. On June 23, 2009, "It's Only Natural" was released and spawned another top 10 hit on Japan's Billboard charts, which was the title of the track of the album, "It's Only Natural." The band toured extensively the rest of 2009, including another tour of Japan culminating in playing the world-famous Fuji Rock Festival, Japan's largest annual music festival.

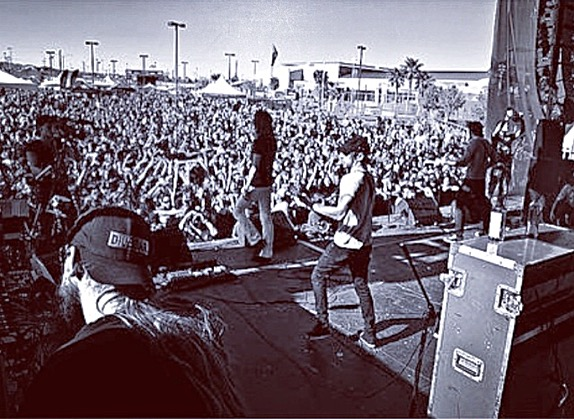
The Higher Warped Tour Miami 2008

Since Oakes' departure the band's former guitar tech and merchandiser Andrew "The Kid" Evans filled in on guitar before the band made him an official member in 2009.

In January 2010, Doug McCarthy left the band for personal issues. Long-time friend and LA-based drummer George Lind replaced him. The band toured most of 2010 with bands such as Quiet Drive, Between the Trees, Rufio, and Sing it Loud. The band completed their final Japanese tour in June 2010. In October 2010, Andrew "The Kid" Evans left the band to pursue his own musical endeavors.

On December 18, 2020, the band's cover of *NSYNC's song "Bye Bye Bye" was digitally released with the promise of more music in the near future.

2021 saw the entering the studio with Mike Pepe (Taking Back Sunday) to work on an EP, Elvis in Wonderland.

On May 27, 2021, The Higher played their first show in 11 years at So What Fest in Dallas. They were then added to Furnace Fest later that year. The band released a single on August 12 titled “Free Ride.” On October 14, 2022, the new EP Elvis in Wonderland was released. In April 2024 the band released their “Hidden Places” LP.

== Discography ==
Date of Release	Title	Label	U.S. Heatseekers Peak
October 28, 2003	Star Is Dead	Fiddler	-
May 3, 2005	Histrionics	Fiddler	-
March 6, 2007	On Fire	Epitaph, Sony	9
June 23, 2009	It's Only Natural	Epitaph, Sony	22
October 14, 2022	Elvis In Wonderland	Parting Gift Records	

=== Album appearances ===
Year	Song	Album
2008	"Rock My Body"	Music from Degrassi: The Next Generation

=== Interviews ===
- https://lasvegasweekly.com/news/2009/jun/18/higher/
- http://www.sonymusic.co.jp/artist/higher/
