= Blame It =

2009 single by Jamie Foxx featuring T-Pain

Single by Jamie Foxx featuring T-Pain

from the album Intuition
- Released: January 26, 2009
- Recorded: 2008
- Genre: R&B; electro hop; hip-hop
- Length: 4:50
- Label: J
- Songwriters: Eric Bishop; Faheem Najm; Christopher Henderson; Breyon Prescott; James T. Brown; John Conte; Brandon Melancon; Nathan Walker; Emerson David Ballard; Terius Nash; Christopher Stewart
- Producer: Christopher "Deep" Henderson

Jamie Foxx singles chronology
"She Got Her Own" (2008)	"Blame It" (2009)	"I Don't Need It" (2009)

T-Pain singles chronology
"Holla Holla" (2008)	"Blame It" (2009)	"I'm on a Boat" (2009)

Audio sample
- file; help

Music video
- "Blame It" on YouTube

"Blame It" (also known as "Blame It (On the Alcohol)") is a song by American singer and actor Jamie Foxx, released as the second official single from his third studio album, Intuition (2008). It features American singer T-Pain and was written by Christopher "Deep" Henderson, Nate Walker, James T. Brown, John Conte Jr., David Ballard and Brandon Melanchon and produced by Christopher "Deep" Henderson. Both Foxx and T-Pain use the Auto-Tune effect. T-Pain also uses some elements from "I Luv Your Girl" by The-Dream.

The song received many accolades and nominations, including a win for Best R&B Performance by a Duo or Group with Vocals at the 52nd Grammy Awards.

"Blame It" is the most successful single from the album, peaking at number two on the US Billboard Hot 100, and number one on the Hot R&B/Hip-Hop Songs chart for 14 consecutive weeks making it the second longest-running number one song on that chart. It also reached the top 10 in Canada and was the bestselling r&b song of 2009 in the US. "Blame It" has sold over one million downloads.

== Promotion ==
He performed this song with T-Pain at the BET Awards and won the award for Best Collaboration. He also performed this at the 52nd Grammy Awards with T-Pain and won the Grammy Award for Best R&B Performance by a Duo or Group with Vocals.

== Chart performance ==
"Blame It" moved rapidly to number one on US Billboard's Hot R&B/Hip-Hop Songs chart, becoming Foxx's first number one on the chart as a lead artist, and his third including featured credits. "Blame It" broke the record for the longest-running number one song ever on the chart by a male artist. It spent fourteen consecutive weeks at number one before finally being knocked off by Jeremih's "Birthday Sex". It is tied with "We Belong Together" by Mariah Carey, "Nobody's Supposed to Be Here" by Deborah Cox and "Pretty Wings" by Maxwell as the second longest-running song ever on the chart. Only "Be Without You" by Mary J. Blige spent more time at number one, with 15 weeks.

On the US Billboard Hot 100, the song peaked at number two, behind the Black Eyed Peas's "Boom Boom Pow" which topped the Hot 100 for 12 weeks, making it his second top ten, but his first top-five hit single on the chart as a lead artist and his highest peak on the chart (following two number ones as a featured artist). The song sold one million downloads in 14 weeks in the United States. On May 26, 2009, the single was certified platinum by the Recording Industry Association of America (RIAA) for sales of over a million digital copies in the United States.

In Canada, it peaked at number seven on the Canadian Hot 100. After consistently remaining in the Hot 100's Top 20 for more than twenty weeks, "Blame It" took a sudden fall from number 22 to 34 in mid-July.

== Music video ==
The music video premiered on 106 & Park on Wednesday, February 25, 2009. Cameo appearances in the video are made by many famous performers, including but not exclusive to (in order of appearance) Jake Gyllenhaal, Forest Whitaker, Ron Howard, Quincy Jones, Morris Chestnut, Samuel L. Jackson, Cedric the Entertainer, Tatyana Ali, and Alicia Keys. BET named it their No. 1 music video for 2009 on their year-end Notarized countdown, beating out videos from artists such as Jay-Z, Maxwell, Alicia Keys and Young Money.

== Cover versions ==
Metalcore band Of Mice & Men covered the track for the compilation album Punk Goes Pop 3, which was released on November 2, 2010.

It was also covered by the cast of Glee for the second season episode "Blame It on the Alcohol", with featured parts given to Kevin McHale, Mark Salling, Amber Riley and Naya Rivera.

It is also reinterpreted as part of the polka medley "Polka Face" on "Weird Al" Yankovic's 2011 album Alpocalypse.

Wayne Brady covered the song on Season 2 of The Masked Singer.

== Charts ==
=== Weekly charts ===
Chart (2009)	Peak position
Australia (ARIA)	79
Canada Hot 100 (Billboard)	7
New Zealand (RIANZ)	29
US Billboard Hot 100	2
US Hot R&B/Hip-Hop Songs (Billboard)	1
US Pop Airplay (Billboard)	3
US Rhythmic Airplay (Billboard)	1

=== Year-end charts ===
Chart (2009)	Position
Canada (Canadian Hot 100)	88
US Billboard Hot 100	16
US Hot R&B/Hip-Hop Songs (Billboard)	1
US Mainstream Top 40 (Billboard)	37
US Rhythmic (Billboard)	2

== Certifications ==
Region	Certification	Certified units/sales
New Zealand (RMNZ)	Platinum	30,000^{‡}
United States (RIAA)	Platinum	1,000,000^{^}
^{^} Shipments figures based on certification alone.^{‡} Sales+streaming figures based on certification alone.

== Release history ==
Release dates and formats for "Blame It"
Region	Date	Format	Label(s)	Ref.
United States	March 10, 2009	Mainstream airplay	J	

== See also ==
- List of R&B number-one singles of 2009 (U.S.)
