= Histrionics (album) =

Studio album by The Higher
- Released: May 3, 2005
- Label: Fiddler

The Higher chronology
Histrionics (2005)	On Fire (2007)

Histrionics is the debut studio album by American pop rock band The Higher, released on May 3, 2005. The album cover is a tribute for Pearl Jam's Vitalogy.

== Track listing ==
1. "Diaries"
2. "Histrionics"
3. "Rock My Body"
4. "Prepare for Something Else"
5. "In the Set"
6. "Case Closed"
7. "Gone with the Guillotine"
8. "Lo"
9. "Darkside"
10. "Valentine's Delay"
11. "From the Window to the Wall"
12. "Circle of Death"
13. "Kalimist"
14. "Pace Yourself"
