= Christopher "Deep" Henderson =

American composer, arranger, and producer

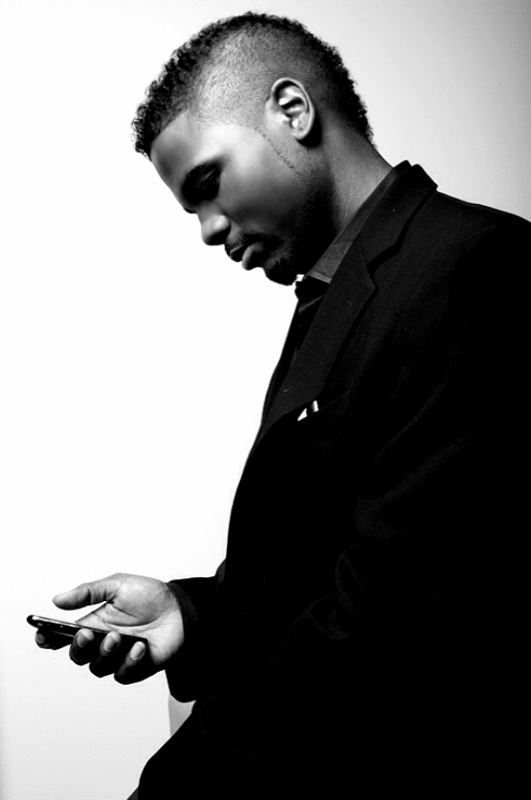

Background information
- Born: Christopher Henderson; Detroit, Michigan, U.S.
- Genres: R&B
- Occupations: Record producer; songwriter; film composer
- Instruments: Piano, drums, vocals, synthesizer
- Years active: 1999–present

Christopher "Deep" Henderson is an American record producer, film composer, and songwriter. He is best known for producing Jamie Foxx's 2009 single "Blame It", which won a Grammy Award and peaked at number two on the Billboard Hot 100.

== Discography ==
2024	"Impossible Love"	Eva Ruiz (featuring Arin Ray)	Composer, Producer
2021	"Rumble"	Dusty Locane	Composer
2020	"You Got It"	Vedo	Producer
2016	"Advertise It"	Jacob Latimore	Composer, producer
2014	"Bigger Than Love"	Beth Spangler	Composer, producer
2011	"My Bed"	Mario	Composer, producer
2008	Intuition	Jamie Foxx	Composer, producer, drum programming, background
2009	Intuition/"Blame It" (featuring T-Pain)	Jamie Foxx	Composer, producer, drum programming, background
2009	Ready	Trey Songz	Producer
2009	Ready/"Be Where You Are"	Trey Songz	Producer
2009	Untitled /"Uh-huh"	R. Kelly	Composer, producer
2009	Untitled/"Elsewhere"	R. Kelly	Producer
2009	Untitled/"Out of the Game"	R. Kelly	Producer
2007	Liberation/"Ayo!"	Mýa	Composer, producer
2006	Point of No Return / "Ayo!"	3LW	Composer, producer
2006	Cheri Dennis/"Freak"	Cheri Dennis	Composer, producer
2003	Ladra Di Vento/ "La Gatta (Sul Tetto)"	Giorgia Todrani	Producer
2003	Jene's Reign / "Get into Something"	Jene	Composer, producer
2002	The Way We Do It /"Oh No She Didn't"	Issys	Producer
2002	The Hot Chick (Soundtrack)/"Get into Something"	Jene	Composer, producer
2001	TP-2.com/"The Greatest Sex"	R. Kelly	Composer, producer
2000	Nutty Professor II "The Klumps"/"Here with Me"	Larry "Jazz" Anthony (Dru Hill)	Producer
2000	Soul Food "The Best R&B of 2000"/"Happily Ever After"	Case	Composer, producer
1999	Personal Conversation/"Happily Ever After"	Case	Composer, producer

== Awards/Nominations ==
Year	Artist	Album/Song/Project	Award
2010	Jamie Foxx and T. Pain	Blame It	Winner: Grammy "Best R&B Performance By A Duo Or Group With Vocals"
2010	Jamie Foxx and T. Pain	Intuition/"Blame it"	Nomination: Grammy "Best R&B Song"
2010	Jamie Foxx	Intuition	Nomination: Grammy "Best Contemporary R&B Album"
2010	Trey Songz	Ready	Nomination: Grammy "Best Contemporary R&B Album"
2010		Billboard Magazine	"Top Five Producers OF The Year"
2004		"Wardrobe Malfunction"	Winner: "Best Movie Score" Independent Film Festival
2000		Billboard Magazine	"Top Ten Producers of the Year"
2000	Case	"Happily Ever After"	Winner: "ASCAP Song of the Year"
1999		Billboard Magazine	"Top Ten Producers of the Year"
