= Year of the Gentleman =

Studio album by Ne-Yo
- Released: September 16, 2008
- Recorded: 2007–2008
- Genres: R&B; pop
- Length: 52:49
- Labels: Compound; Def Jam
- Producers: Ne-Yo; Kirven Arrington; Butter Beats; Polow Da Don; Chuck Harmony; StarGate; Stereotypes; Syience; Shea Taylor; Shomari Wilson

Ne-Yo chronology
Because of You (2007)	Year of the Gentleman (2008)	Libra Scale (2010)

Singles from Year of the Gentleman
- 1. "Closer" Released: April 8, 2008; 2. "Miss Independent" Released: August 26, 2008; 3. "Mad" Released: November 17, 2008; 4. "She Got Her Own" Released: December 14, 2008; 5. "Part of the List" Released: April 7, 2009; 6. "Nobody" Released: July 24, 2009 (Note: "Nobody" was only released as a single in Italy.)

Year of the Gentleman is the third studio album by American singer and songwriter Ne-Yo. It was released by Compound Entertainment and Def Jam Recordings on September 16, 2008, in the United States. As with his previous albums In My Own Words (2006) and Because of You (2007), Ne-Yo worked with Stargate, Reggie "Syience" Perry, and Shea Taylor on much of the album, but also consulted new collaborators, including Chuck Harmony, Polow da Don, The Stereotypes, Butter Beats, and Shomari "Sho" Wilson.

The album was a commercial success, charting in the top-10 in several countries. Year of the Gentleman reached number two on the US Billboard 200 and was eventually certified platinum by the Recording Industry Association of America (RIAA), for shipments of one million copies in the United States, making it his third platinum-selling album as well as his third consecutive top ten album following Because of You. It has also been certified double platinum by the British Phonographic Industry (BPI), for shipments of 600,000 copies in the United Kingdom. It was also certified in Canada, Italy, Japan, New Zealand, and Saudi Arabia.

Released to favorable reviews from music critics, Year of the Gentleman earned Ne-Yo six Grammy nominations, including Album of the Year and Best Contemporary R&B Album at the 51st award ceremony. Rolling Stone ranked it number 33 on its list of the 50 Best albums of 2008. In support of the album, Def Jam released four singles, including international hit singles "Closer" and "Miss Independent", as well as "Mad" and "Part of the List".

== Background ==
Year of the Gentleman was named in honor of Ne-Yo's artistic influences. Ne-Yo cited the 1960s American group Rat Pack, particularly members Frank Sinatra and Sammy Davis Jr. as influences, whose style inspired his clothes and music. Explaining the album's title, he said he was "trying to take it back to where you couldn't walk out of the house unless you looked your best". Commenting on the likes of the Rat Pack and Nat King Cole he commented that "they're suited and everything is right from top to bottom. Not saying it has to be a suit, 'cause clothes don't make the man — it's the attitude and person. The music needs to personify that.". No featurings are present on the album, as previously announced, though "Single" also features as a version with New Kids on the Block on their album, The Block.

Although Ne-Yo has claimed that he wanted to "take a different direction" on the album by enlargening his R&B sounds, according to Billboard magazine, "it seems he still has a heavy—yet welcome—case of the (rhythm and) blues on the finished product". The scene in the background for the cover was shot at the million mansion, known as Pink Palace, in the Buckhead district of Atlanta, Georgia.

== Release and promotion ==
"Miss Independent"
"Miss Independent" from Year of the Gentleman

"She Got Her Own (Miss Independent Part 2)"
The remix features Fabolous and Jamie Foxx.

The first single, "Closer", was released on April 8. The song debuted at number twenty-two on the UK Singles Chart, and later reached number one. On Billboard's Hot 100, the song peaked at number seven, while it has reached number one on the Hot 100 Airplay chart. The second single was supposed to be "Stop This World", but was replaced by "Miss Independent", which was released on August 11. The physical release will be accompanied by a video which premiered on August 21 on Access Granted. Both of these songs are produced and co-written by Stargate. The album was re-released on December 3, 2008, in Japan, featuring the original Japanese bonus tracks, "What's The Matter" and "She Got Her Own" (featuring Fabolous & Jamie Foxx), as well as two remixes of "Closer" and an exclusive US iTunes track "In The Way" (track list on hmv.co.jp)

The third single is confirmed to be "Mad" and goes for adds on Urban/Rhythmic on October 14, 2008. A video has been made for song "She Got Her Own" and is the official international single. On May 21, 2008—months before the album's release—Ne-Yo performed the ballad "Stop This World" on the ABC soap opera All My Children. Appearing as himself, Ne-Yo sang the song during the lavish wedding ceremony of supercouple Jesse and Angie Hubbard. The fourth single is confirmed to be "Part of the List". The music video is shot in Prague on March 22. Director is TAJ of the Popular Kid. Video produced by Andrew Listermann of Riveting Entertainment. "Nobody" was released on July 24, 2009, as a single exclusively for the Italian market.

== Critical response ==
Professional ratings
Aggregate scores
Source	Rating
Metacritic	79/100
Review scores
Source	Rating
AllMusic	4/5 stars
The A.V. Club	C+
Entertainment Weekly	B+
The Guardian	4/5 stars
Los Angeles Times	3.5/4 stars
PopMatters	7/10 stars
Rolling Stone	4/5 stars
Slant Magazine	3/5 stars
USA Today	3.5/4 stars
Vibe	4/5 stars

Year of the Gentleman became Ne-Yo's most well received album by critics at the time. At Metacritic, which assigns a normalized rating out of 100 to reviews from critics, the album received an average score of 79, which indicates "generally favorable" reviews, based on 12 reviews. In her review for Rolling Stone, Caryn Ganz stated that "the 28-year-old singer-songwriter says his latest collection of heartfelt love songs is a tribute to the Rat Pack's pressed-suit style, but it's actually a superb concept album about what a great boyfriend he can be." Vibe's Brad Wete wrote that Ne-Yo "is a stronger, more confident man than the one many remember licking his wounds" on his previous work. Newsday writer Glenn Gamboa gave it an A− rating and wrote "for the bulk of the album, Ne-Yo has simply honed his hit-making skills, churning out one memorable melody after another, building an album that finally lives up to the potential he only hinted at on his first two releases, both lyrically and vocally."

Amy Linden of The Village Voice said that the album "reconfigures 'grown and sexy' by detailing relationships with an often uneasy mix of heartache, reflection, wit, lust, and resignation." Steve Jones from USA Today found that "considering how many hit songs he generates for other artists, it's a testament to his attention to storytelling detail that he has so much good material for himself [...] To his credit, he keeps his disc guest star-free, despite his A-list outside collaborations. In just over two years, he has shown significant growth through three worthy albums, hinting that he may only be scratching the surface of his potential." Robert Christgau gave the album a rating of honorable mention, indicating a "likable effort consumers attuned to its overriding aesthetic or individual vision may well enjoy". However, Slant Magazine's Eric Henderson found it "musically uneven and ballad-heavy," while Nathan Rabin, writer for The A.V. Club, noted that Ne-Yo's "winning groove devolves into a rut, and his quiet storm gets awfully sleepy."

== Commercial performance ==
Year of the Gentleman debuted at number two on the Billboard 200 with 250,000 copies sold making his first album not to debut at number one on the chart. The album debuted at number two on the UK Albums Chart, giving Ne-Yo his highest-charting album in the UK, beating Because of You, which debuted at number six in 2007. In Japan, the album debuted at number one and has thus far sold over 200,000 copies and in the UK 100,000 copies in its first week. The album has since been certified platinum in the UK.

== Track listing ==
Year of the Gentleman
No.	Title	Writer(s)	Producer(s)	Length
1.	"Closer"	Shaffer Smith; Tor Erik Hermansen; Mikkel Storleer Eriksen; Magnus Beite; Bernt Rune Stray	Stargate; Ne-Yo^{[a]}	3:54
2.	"Nobody"	Smith	Kirven Arrington	3:07
3.	"Single"	Smith; Jamal Jones	Polow da Don	4:18
4.	"Mad"	Smith; Hermansen; Eriksen	Stargate; Ne-Yo^{[a]}	4:15
5.	"Miss Independent"	Smith; Hermansen; Eriksen	Stargate; Ne-Yo^{[a]}	3:52
6.	"Why Does She Stay"	Smith; Jonathan Yip; Ray Romulus; Jeremy Reeves; Micayle McKinney	The Stereotypes	4:33
7.	"Fade into the Background"	Smith; Shomari "Sho" Wilson	Wilson	3:18
8.	"So You Can Cry"	Smith; Reggie Perry	Syience	4:18
9.	"Part of the List"	Smith; Charles Harmon	Chuck Harmony	4:10
10.	"Back to What You Know"	Smith; Hermansen; Eriksen; Beite; Stray	Stargate; Ne-Yo^{[a]}	4:10
11.	"Lie to Me"	Smith; Shea Taylor	Taylor	4:27
12.	"Stop This World"	Smith; Harmon	Harmony	4:24
Total length:				48:46

Year of the Gentleman iTunes version bonus track
No.	Title	Writer(s)	Producer(s)	Length
13.	"She Got Her Own" (featuring Jamie Foxx and Fabolous)	Smith; David Debrandon Brown; John Jackson; Antonio Jimenez	Butter Beats	5:32
Total length:				54:18

Notes

- ^{^[a]} signifies a co-producer
- "She Got Her Own" contains portions of "My Baby Understands", as written and performed by Donna Summer.

== Personnel ==
Credits for Year of a Gentleman adapted from Allmusic and album's liner notes.

- Kirven Arrington – producer and engineer (track 1)
- Davis A. Barnett – viola (track 12)
- Jesse Bond – guitar (track 12)
- Chavez – assistant mix engineer (tracks 9, 12)
- Jeff Chestek – string engineer (track 12)
- Carol Corless – package production
- Ryan D – assistant mixing engineer (tracks 1, 10)
- Kevin "KD" Davis – mixing (tracks 1, 2, 6, 7, 9–12)
- Mikkel S. Eriksen – producer, engineer, and instrumentation (tracks 1, 4, 5, 10)
- Larry Gold – string arranger and conductor (track 12)
- Jaymz Hardy-Martin III – engineer (tracks 7, 11), vocal engineer and mixing (track 8)
- Chuck Harmony – producer (tracks 9, 12), string arrangement (track 12)
- Tor Erik Hermansen – producer and instrumentation (tracks 1, 4, 5, 10)
- Josh Houghkirk – additional engineering (tracks 3–5), assistant mix engineer (track 9)
- Olga Konopelsky – violin (track 12)
- Emma Kummrow – violin (track 12)
- Daniele Laporte – tracking (track 11)
- Alexandra Leem – viola (track 12)
- Jennie Lorenzo – cello (track 12)
- Rob Martin – violin (track 12)
- Micayle "The Mack" McKinney – keyboards (track 6)
- Ne-Yo – vocals (all tracks), co-producer (tracks 1, 4, 5, 10), executive producer
- Charles Parker – violin (track 12)
- Polow da Don – producer (track 3)
- Herb Powers – mastering
- Geno Regist – engineer (tracks 6, 9, 12)
- L.A. Reid – executive producer
- Montez Roberts – assistant engineer (track 12)
- J. Peter Robinson – art direction, design
- John Stahl – assistant engineer (track 12)
- Chris Stanford – photography
- The Stereotypes – producers (track 6)
- Bernt Rune Stray – guitar (tracks 1, 10)
- Syience – producer and instrumentation(track 8)
- Igor Szwec – violin (track 12)
- Phil Tan – mixing (tracks 3–5, 9)
- Shea Taylor – producer, guitar, drum programming, piano, strings, bass and synths (track 11)
- Gregory Teperman – violin (track 12)
- Tony Terrebonne – engineer (track 3)
- Brandon Thomas – guitar (track 9)
- Shomari "Sho" Wilson – producer and instrumentation (track 7)

== Charts ==
=== Weekly charts ===
Chart (2008)	Peak position
Australian Albums (ARIA)	7
Austrian Albums (Ö3 Austria)	41
Belgian Albums (Ultratop Flanders)	34
Belgian Albums (Ultratop Wallonia)	58
Canadian Albums (Billboard)	4
Dutch Albums (Album Top 100)	26
French Albums (SNEP)	24
German Albums (Offizielle Top 100)	22
Irish Albums (IRMA)	13
Italian Albums (FIMI)	23
Japanese Albums (Oricon)	2
New Zealand Albums (RMNZ)	6
Scottish Albums (Official Charts)	7
Swiss Albums (Schweizer Hitparade)	9
UK Albums (Official Charts)	2
UK R&B Albums (Official Charts)	1
US Billboard 200	2
US Top R&B/Hip-Hop Albums (Billboard)	1

=== Year-end charts ===
Chart (2008)	Position
Australian Urban Albums (ARIA)	15
Japanese Albums (Oricon)	53
UK Albums (OCC)	24
US Billboard 200	65
US Top R&B/Hip-Hop Albums (Billboard)	16

Chart (2009)	Position
US Billboard 200	63
US Top R&B/Hip-Hop Albums (Billboard)	20

== Certifications ==
Certifications for Year of the Gentleman
Region	Certification	Certified units/sales
Canada (Music Canada)	Gold	40,000^{^}
Denmark (IFPI Danmark)	Gold	10,000^{‡}
GCC (IFPI Middle East)	Gold	3,000^{*}
Italy (FIMI)	Gold	25,000^{‡}
Japan (RIAJ)	Platinum	250,000^{^}
New Zealand (RMNZ)	Platinum	15,000^{‡}
Singapore (RIAS)	Gold	5,000^{*}
United Kingdom (BPI)	2× Platinum	600,000^{^}
United States (RIAA)	Platinum	1,000,000^{^}
^{*} Sales figures based on certification alone.^{^} Shipments figures based on certification alone.^{‡} Sales+streaming figures based on certification alone.

== Release history ==
Table of release dates, formats, editions and record labels
Region	Date	Label	Format	Editions
Worldwide	September 11, 2008	Universal International	CD, digital download	Standard
Germany	September 12, 2008	Def Jam	CD, digital download	Standard
Italy	September 12, 2008	Def Jam	CD, digital download	Standard
United Kingdom	September 15, 2008	Mercury	CD, digital download	Standard
United States	September 16, 2008	Def Jam	CD, digital download	Standard
Brazil	October 21, 2008	Universal Music	CD, digital download	Standard
