= Good Girl Gone Bad Live =

Video by Rihanna
- Released: June 9, 2008
- Recorded: December 6, 2007
- Venues: Manchester Arena (Manchester, England)
- Length: 90 minutes
- Language: English
- Labels: Def Jam; SRP
- Director: Paul Caslin

Rihanna video chronology
Good Girl Gone Bad Live (2008)	Loud Tour Live at the O2 (2012)

Good Girl Gone Bad Live is the first live long-form video by Barbadian singer Rihanna. It was first released on June 9, 2008 by Def Jam Recordings. The DVD and Blu-ray release features Rihanna's concert at the Manchester Arena in Manchester, United Kingdom held on December 6, 2007, as part of her Good Girl Gone Bad Tour (2007—2009) which supported singer's third studio album Good Girl Gone Bad (2007). Most of the concert's set list originates from Good Girl Gone Bad, however, Rihanna also performed songs from her previous albums Music of the Sun (2005) and A Girl like Me (2006). It also contains a special Documentary Feature that presents Rihanna discussing her experiences during the tour.

Critics were divided on Good Girl Gone Bad Live; they praised the show, dancers, Rihanna's vocals and contrast levels of the video, however, there was criticism towards some technicalities including the close-up frames. At the 2009 Grammy Awards, the video album received a Grammy nomination for Best Long Form Music Video. Commercially, Good Girl Gone Bad Live peaked within the top-ten in nine countries, including at number one in Austria and Switzerland. On the US Billboard Music DVD Chart it peaked at number six and was certified gold by the Recording Industry Association of America (RIAA), denoting shipments of over 25,000 copies.

== Background and release ==
Following the release of her two studio albums Music of the Sun (2005) and A Girl like Me (2006), in late 2006 Rihanna started working with songwriters and producers on her third studio album. She worked with some of the producers who were involved on her previous albums including Evan Rogers and Carl Sturken, Ne-Yo, J.R. Rotem, Sean Garrett and Norwegian duo Stargate. Rihanna also collaborated with new music producers on the album such as Timbaland and will.i.am. Most of the album tracks were recorded in Westlake Recording Studios in Los Angeles, California, parallel to the recording sessions of her second studio album, A Girl like Me. Rihanna began working on the album in late 2006 and was almost finished recording in late February 2007. On June 4, 2007 she released the album under the name Good Girl Gone Bad. During an interview with MTV News, Rihanna explained the meaning and reasoning behind the album's title:

We figured Good Girl Gone Bad was the perfect title because it showed people I'm my own [person] now. Not doing what anyone wants me to do. I'm not the innocent Rihanna anymore. I'm taking a lot more risks and chances. I felt when I cut my hair, it shows people I'm not trying to look or be anybody else. The album is very edgy. We have some urban records, some really pop records."

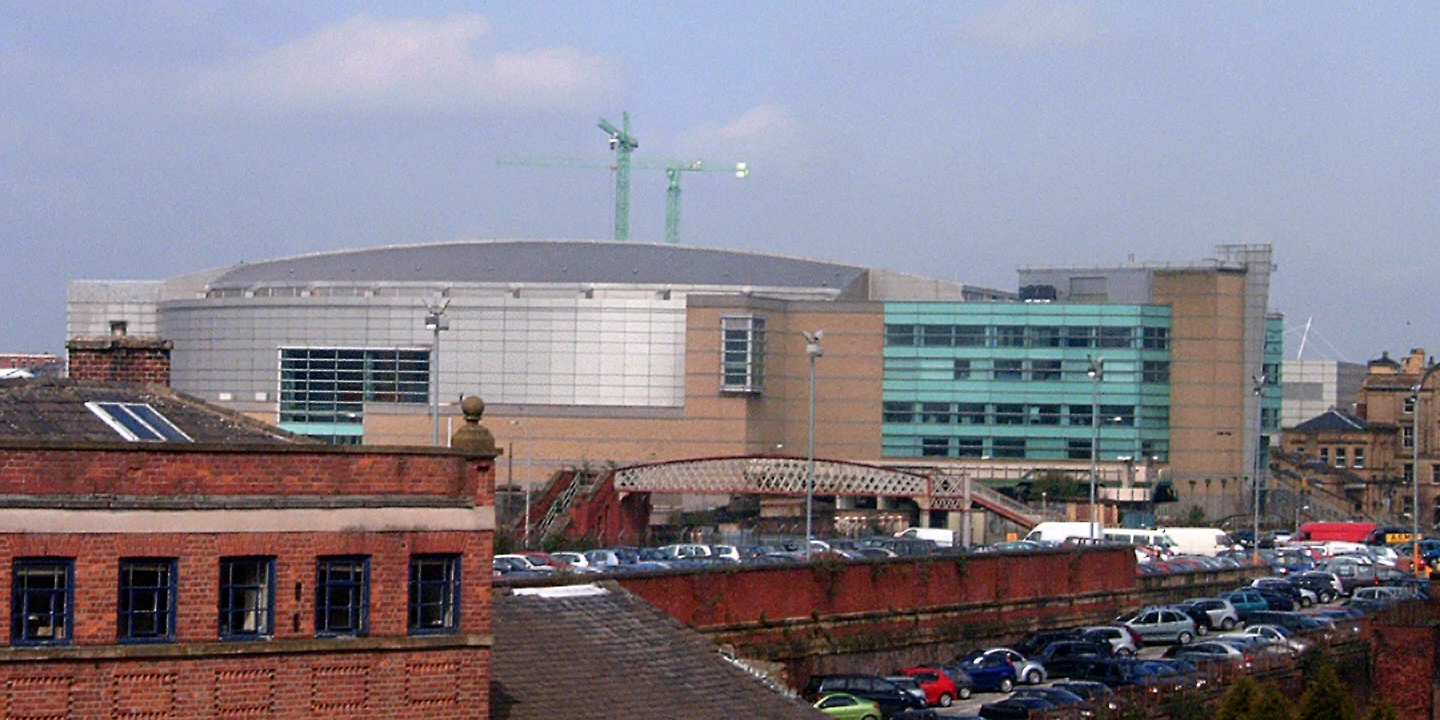
Manchester Arena, the venue where Good Girl Gone Bad Live was filmed.

Upon its release, Good Girl Gone Bad received generally positive reviews from most music critics and earned Rihanna a Grammy Award for Best Rap/Sung Collaboration for the lead single "Umbrella". It became a huge commercial success and spawned eight singles that attained chart success. To further promote the album, Rihanna embarked on her first worldwide and second overall tour entitled Good Girl Gone Bad Tour (2007—09). During the tour, Rihanna performed in Europe, North America, Oceania, Asia and Africa in a total of 80 concert shows. Good Girl Gone Bad Live was filmed at the Manchester Arena show in Manchester, United Kingdom; the show was part of the Good Girl Gone Bad Tour and held on December 6, 2007. The Good Girl Gone Bad Live DVD was released on June 9 and June 13, 2008 in the United Kingdom and Germany through Mercury Records and Universal Music respectively. It was digitally released via iTunes on June 16, 2008 in several countries including Australia, Austria, Brazil, France, Germany, the Republic of Ireland, Japan, New Zealand, Spain and the United Kingdom. Universal Music Canada and Def Jam Recordings released the DVD of the concert in Canada and the United States on November 4, 2008. A Blu-ray format of Good Girl Gone Bad Live was released in France on November 24, 2008. In late 2009, the same Blu-ray was also released in the United States and Germany.

== Technicalities and synopsis ==
Good Girl Gone Bad Live was directed by Paul Caslin and captured with a 14-camera High Definition shoot. The Blu-ray edition of the video album is presented in an aspect ratio of 1.78:1, encoded with MPEG-4 AVC and grants a 1080i transfer. Good Girl Gone Bad Live contains two audio tracks DTS-HD Master Audio 5.1 and LPCM 2.0. According to a reviewer of Blu-ray.com the LPCM 2.0 is very strong, but it is not as convincing as the DTS-HD Master Audio 5.1 track. He stated that "The crowd noise, for example, is pushed back quite a bit when Rihanna sings, yet between the songs, it is as prominent as it is on the DTS-HD Master Audio 5.1 track." It has a length of over 90 minutes and contains five subtitles: English, French, Spanish, Portuguese and German.

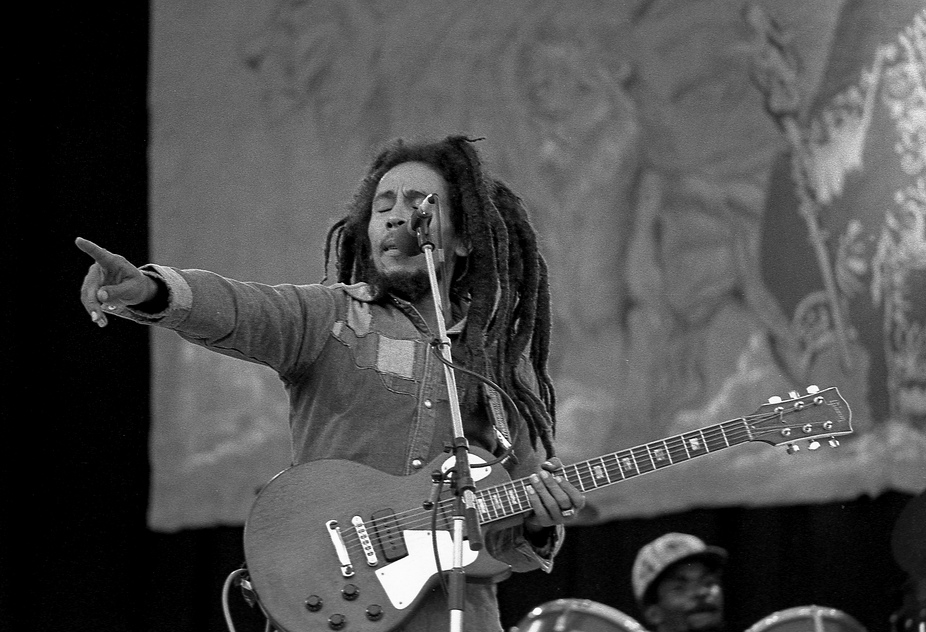
During the concert, Rihanna performed a cover of "Is This Love" by Bob Marley (pictured) & The Wailers

Good Girl Gone Bad Live opens with a black-and-white video interlude of Rihanna putting on and zipping up leather clothing. Scenes are intercut with an aerial view of the audience in the arena. As the audience is waiting for her to perform, scenes of Rihanna approaching the stage are shown. As she says "Let's go" the music begins to play. The concert opens as Rihanna emerges from a portable floor behind a giant curtain and starts performing her debut single "Pon de Replay". The show continues with her performing "Break It Off" and "Let Me". Before performing "Rehab", Rihanna reveals that the song was written by Justin Timberlake who is her "very good friend and hopes that the audience like it". Then, she performs "Breakin' Dishes" before rendering a cover of "Is This Love", a song by Jamaican reggae singer Bob Marley and his band the Wailers. "Is This Love" is mashed-up with "Kisses Don't Lie". The song is the last from the first set and ends with Rihanna leaving the stage at the portable floor from which she entered.

The second set opens with Rihanna performing "SOS", accompanied with dancers wearing ancient Egypt inspired outfits who through the performance change their clothes. Rihanna then sits on the stairs on the stage together with her back-up singers Ashley and Erica who are about to help her with the next songs, "Good Girl Gone Bad" and "Hate That I Love You". Rihanna finishes the set with the performances of the ballad "Unfaithful" and "Sell Me Candy". In the next set, the disc jockey asks the audience are they ready to party and then Rihanna emerges from behind the stage to perform "Don't Stop the Music" and "Push Up on Me"; the latter features Rihanna and the dancers climbing on assembled rods. Before the performance of "Shut Up and Drive", the back-up singers run through the stage carrying finish racing flags. As Rihanna enters the stage, the dancers also come together with chairs which are set to represent vehicle seats. Rihanna performs "Question Existing" on a leopard-leather inspired sofa which is climbed on a pedestal. The concert ends with the performance of "Umbrella". Before performing the song, Rihanna speaks to the audience telling that she will perform her "biggest record so far all over the world". The concert ends with frames of the audience and the fans.

=== Documentary Feature ===
"Every day I hit the stage, I look out at the audience and I think: 'They all bought those tickets to come and see me perform. Oh my God, they are singing my song, they're screaming my name.' That's when all gets weird. So it's kind of overwhelming".

— Rihanna talking about her fans during the Documentary Feature interview.

Good Girl Gone Bad Live contains a Documentary Feature of the Good Girl Gone Bad Tour during her course. It begins with the performance of "Umbrella" at the Manchester show when the scenes are intercut with Rihanna talking about how her fans are coming to watch her on the tour concerts. Other scenes of Rihanna and her crew members, dancers and band are also shown backstage. Rihanna then continues with the interview telling about how she went to some places that she never heard in her life including Ischgl and Sofia. She also explains how flying in private jet with her team like "one family" is fun, but very rare. Scenes of Rihanna performing a show in Ischgl and having snowball fight with her team at the town's streets are shown. During the interview Rihanna explains that she, her crew members and dancers were touring for a considerable amount of time and became very close so as a result of that, they hang out a lot. One of the crew explains: "It is like a family. Rihanna comes in every day, says hi to every single one of us. Each of us come in every day, we all say hi to each other." Rihanna further describes herself as a prankster, and a story of her and one of the crew members pranking is shown. Scenes are intercut to Rihanna and her team performing a show. Later, Rihanna jokingly explains that they put probably "the worst show ever" because of her dancers.

Rihanna explains what they do when they get to a city: "Sometimes we get to the city that morning. We sometimes come straight to the venue. We pull up, everybody comes out, you shower, then you do your sound check. Then it's time to get ready. Hair, makeup, that's the fun part." Rihanna then shows her dressing room, makeup artists and costumes. She explains how she loves wearing black on stage because she is "good girl gone bad and black is kind of gothic and rock n' roll". Rihanna explains how she is nervous before the beginning of the show because of the atmosphere where all of her fans are screaming her name. According to her, the beginning of the show is up-tempo and loud, before becoming a little bit "mellow" at the middle of it. The show then gets "on party" again with their techno club set-list. The encore consists of "Question Existing" and "Umbrella". According to Rihanna, "Question Existing" is a very personal song which American singer Ne-Yo wrote "on behalf of entertainers". She concluded that it is very hard for her to call herself a superstar. The Documentary Feature ends with Rihanna announcing that in the end of 2008 she will be hitting the studio again and "she won't be away for too long".

== Critical response ==
Azeem Ahmad of MusicOMH positively reviewed Good Girl Gone Bad Live giving it four stars and wrote that "it isn't going to win over any new fans, but buying it won't disappoint the many that already exist". According to him the songs are different from their recorded versions and sound "infectiously upbeat but in a more grown-up way than the album". Ahmad concluded that even the "cringey" American pronunciation of "Manchester" and associated drivel can't take away the vocal strength of "Rehab". He further praised the interlude "Scratch" calling it "impressive". Ahmad concluded that "If anyone was still wondering, Rihanna isn't miming during this show but the DVD's audio might be little bit out of sync with the video." A reviewer of Blu-ray.com was more critical stating that even though the transfer does not have serious technical flaws, the video can not pair to Live from the Royal Albert Hall (2009) by American rock band The Killers. According to the reviewer there are few close-ups that look soft and also a lot of motion-judder that ranges from mild to strong. He stated that the camera positioning during a lot of acts in not "overly convincing" and some close-ups are too dark. However, according to him contrast levels are good. The reviewer concluded that "all in all, consistency is definitely an issue with Good Girl Gone Bad; parts of the show look great in high-definition, but there are also certain parts of it that are far from convincing." At the 51st Annual Grammy Awards, Good Girl Gone Bad Live received a nomination for Best Long Form Music Video, but lost to Runnin' Down a Dream (2007).

== Commercial performance ==
Good Girl Gone Bad Live debuted at its peak of number six on the US Billboard Music DVD chart for the issue dated August 2, 2008. The next week it dropped to number 12, before falling to number 19 for the week dated August 16, 2008. The next week it fell off the chart, but re-entered on November 22, 2008 at number 11, as a result of its DVD release in the United States. Good Girl Gone Bad Live stayed on the chart for total of 23 weeks. In Australia, Good Girl Gone Bad Live entered the Australian Music DVD Chart at its peak of number six for the issue dated June 30, 2008. The next week it fell to number 11 and stayed on the position for three weeks. The following week the video album dropped two places to number 13. Good Girl Gone Bad Live was certified platinum by the Australian Recording Industry Association (ARIA)

Good Girl Gone Bad Live debuted at number one on the Austrian Music DVD Chart on July 4, 2008. However, the next week it fell seven places to number eight and stayed on the position for two weeks. On July 25, 2008 it started climbing the chart again and eventually reached number five on August 8, 2008. Good Girl Gone Bad Live entered the Swiss Music DVD Chart at number three on July 6, 2008, however, it rose to number one the following week. On July 13, 2008 it fell to number five, but climbed to number two the following week. The video album reached a peak of number two on the Belgium Music DVD Chart in both Flanders and Wallonia. Good Girl Gone Bad Live also peaked at number seven on the Dutch Music DVD Chart and Spanish Music DVD Chart and at number nine on the Italian Music DVD Chart.

== Track listing ==
No.	Title	Writer(s)	Length
1.	"Pon de Replay"	A. Brooks; Vada Nobles; Carl Sturken; Evan Rogers	3:26
2.	"Break It Off"	D. Bennett; Sean Henriques; K. Ford; Robyn Fenty	2:00
3.	"Let Me"	Makeba Riddick; Mikkel S. Eriksen; Tor Erik Hermansen; Rogers; Sturken	4:13
4.	"Rehab"	Justin Timberlake; Timothy Mosley; Hannon Lane	3:21
5.	"Breakin' Dishes"	Christopher Stewart; Terius Nash	3:21
6.	"Is This Love"	Bob Marley	3:09
7.	"Kisses Don't Lie"	Rogers; Sturken; Fenty	3:01
8.	"Scratch"	T. Bruno	2:22
9.	"SOS"	Jonathan Rotem; Evan Bogart; Ed Cobb	3:31
10.	"Good Girl Gone Bad"	Shaffer Smith; Hermansen; Eriksen; Lene Marlin	3:19
11.	"Hate That I Love You"	Smith; Hermansen; Eriksen	3:39
12.	"Unfaithful"	Smith; Hermansen; Eriksen	3:59
13.	"Sell Me Candy"	Nash; Riddick; Mosley	3:45
14.	"Don't Stop the Music"	Hermansen; Eriksen; Tawanna Dabney; Michael Jackson	4:11
15.	"Push Up On Me"	Rotem; Riddick; Lionel Richie; Cynthia Weil	2:26
16.	"Shut Up and Drive"	Rogers; Sturken; Stephen Morris; Peter Hook; Bernard Sumner; Gillian Gilbert	5:14
17.	"Question Existing"	Smith; Shea Taylor; Shawn Carter	4:44
18.	"Umbrella"	Stewart; Nash; Thaddis Harrell; Carter	4:55

Bonus features
No.	Title	Length
19.	"Documentary Feature"	16:50
20.	"Hidden video"	3:00

== Charts ==
Chart (2008)	Peak position
Australian Music DVD Chart	6
Austrian Music DVD Chart	1
Belgium Music DVD Chart (Flanders)	2
Belgium Music DVD Chart (Wallonia)	2
Dutch Music DVD Chart	7
Italian Music DVD Chart	9
Polish Albums Chart	3
Spanish Music DVD Chart	7
Swedish Music Video Chart	16
Swiss Music DVD Chart	1
US Billboard Music DVD Chart	6

== Certifications ==
Region	Certification	Certified units/sales
Australia (ARIA)	Platinum	15,000^{^}
Brazil (Pro-Música Brasil)	Gold	15,000^{*}
United States (RIAA)	Gold	50,000^{^}
^{*} Sales figures based on certification alone.^{^} Shipments figures based on certification alone.

== Credits and personnel ==
Band

- Rihanna (lead vocals)
- Kevin Hastings (keyboards)
- Eric Smith (bass)
- David Haddon (drums)
- Adam Ross (lead guitar)
- Richard Fortus (rhythm guitar)
- Ashleigh Haney (backing vocals)
- Erica King (backing vocals)

Styling

- Ursula Stephen (hair)
- Mylah Morales (makeup)
- Lysa Cooper (stylist)
- Mariel Haenn (stylist)
- Hollywood (stylist)

Crew on the road

- Anthony Randall (production manager)
- JP Firmin (tour manager)
- Mark Dawson (security)
- Fankie Fuccile (stage manager)
- Alex MacLeod (tour accountant)
- Dave Berrera (stage tech)
- Alex Skowron (lighting director)
- TJ Thompson (rigger)
- Simon James (carpenter)
- David Kirkwood (front-of-house engineer)
- Richard Galercki (monitor engineer)
- Elizabeth Springer (wardrobe)

Dancers

- Victoria Parsons (dance captain)
- Rachel Markarian
- Bryan Tanaka
- Julius Law

Credits adapted from the notes of Good Girl Gone Bad Live, Def Jam Recordings, SRP Records.

== Release history ==
Country	Date	Format	Label
United Kingdom	June 9, 2008	DVD	Mercury Records
Germany	June 13, 2008	DVD	Universal Music
Argentina	June 16, 2008	Digital download	Def Jam Recordings
Australia	June 16, 2008	Digital download	Def Jam Recordings
Austria	June 16, 2008	Digital download	Def Jam Recordings
Brazil	June 16, 2008	Digital download	Def Jam Recordings
Czech Republic	June 16, 2008	Digital download	Def Jam Recordings
France	June 16, 2008	Digital download	Def Jam Recordings
Germany	June 16, 2008	Digital download	Def Jam Recordings
Hungary	June 16, 2008	Digital download	Def Jam Recordings
Ireland	June 16, 2008	Digital download	Def Jam Recordings
Japan	June 16, 2008	Digital download	Def Jam Recordings
Netherlands	June 16, 2008	Digital download	Def Jam Recordings
New Zealand	June 16, 2008	Digital download	Def Jam Recordings
Portugal	June 16, 2008	Digital download	Def Jam Recordings
Spain	June 16, 2008	Digital download	Def Jam Recordings
Switzerland	June 16, 2008	Digital download	Def Jam Recordings
United Kingdom	June 16, 2008	Digital download	Def Jam Recordings
United States	November 4, 2008	DVD	Def Jam Recordings
Canada	November 4, 2008	DVD	Universal Music
France	November 24, 2008	Blu-ray	Universal Music
France	December 26, 2008	DVD	Universal Music
United States	October 26, 2009	Blu-ray	Def Jam Recordings
Germany	December 8, 2009	Blu-ray	Universal Music
