= Good Girl Gone Bad Tour =

2007–2009 concert tour by Rihanna

- Tour by Rihanna
- Promotional poster for the tour
- Associated album: Good Girl Gone Bad
- Start date: September 15, 2007
- End date: January 24, 2009
- Legs: 9
- No. of shows: 80
- Supporting acts: Akon; Kardinal Offishall; Ray Lavender; Kat DeLuna; Ciara; DanceX; David Jordan; Chris Brown; María José; Sistanova

Rihanna concert chronology
- Rihanna: Live in Concert (2006); Good Girl Gone Bad Tour (2007–09); A Girl's Night Out (2008)

The Good Girl Gone Bad Tour was the second overall and first world concert tour by Barbadian singer Rihanna, in support of her third studio album Good Girl Gone Bad (2007). The setlist was composed of songs mostly from Good Girl Gone Bad but also included some songs from her first two albums. Akon was selected as the opening act for the Canadian dates of the North American leg, while Ciara and David Jordan supported the UK dates of the European leg. Chris Brown joined the tour during the Oceanian leg.

The show featured Rihanna wearing revealing leather costumes during each show. Many changes were made to the set list throughout the tour. The original set list features a cover of Bob Marley's "Is This Love" and during the European leg of the tour, the set list was shortened to fifteen songs. In the third set list of the Oceanian and Asian leg, the show ended with an encore. A DVD of the Manchester concert at the Manchester Arena titled Good Girl Gone Bad Live was released on June 17, 2008.

== Background and development ==
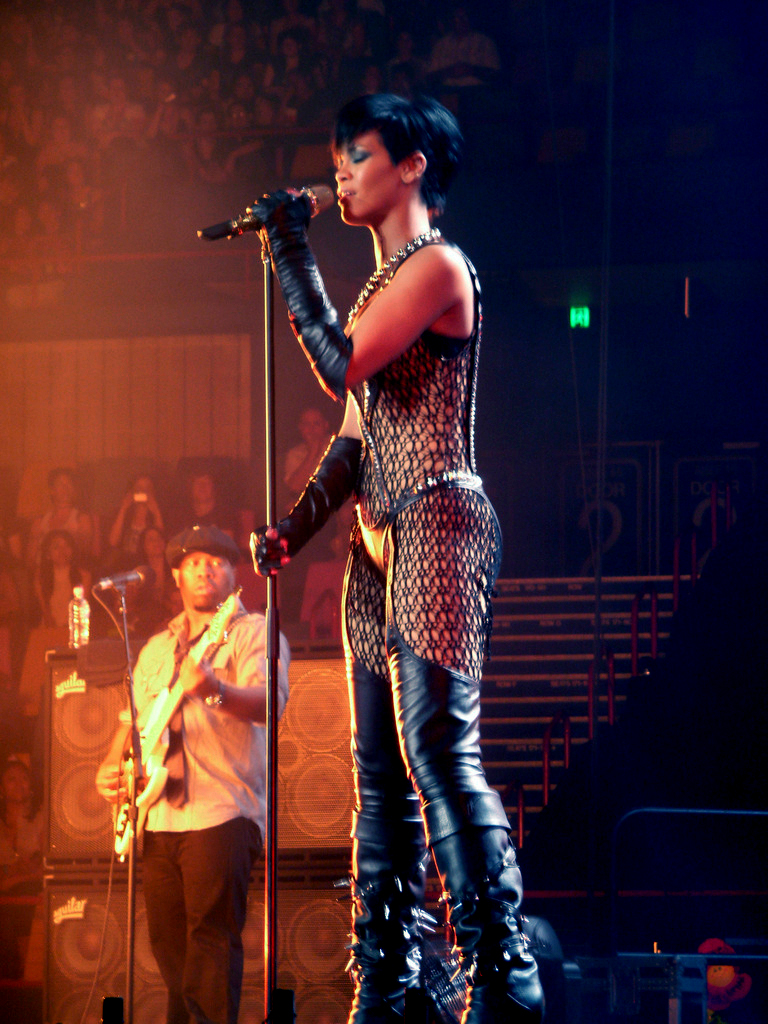
Rihanna performing during the tour

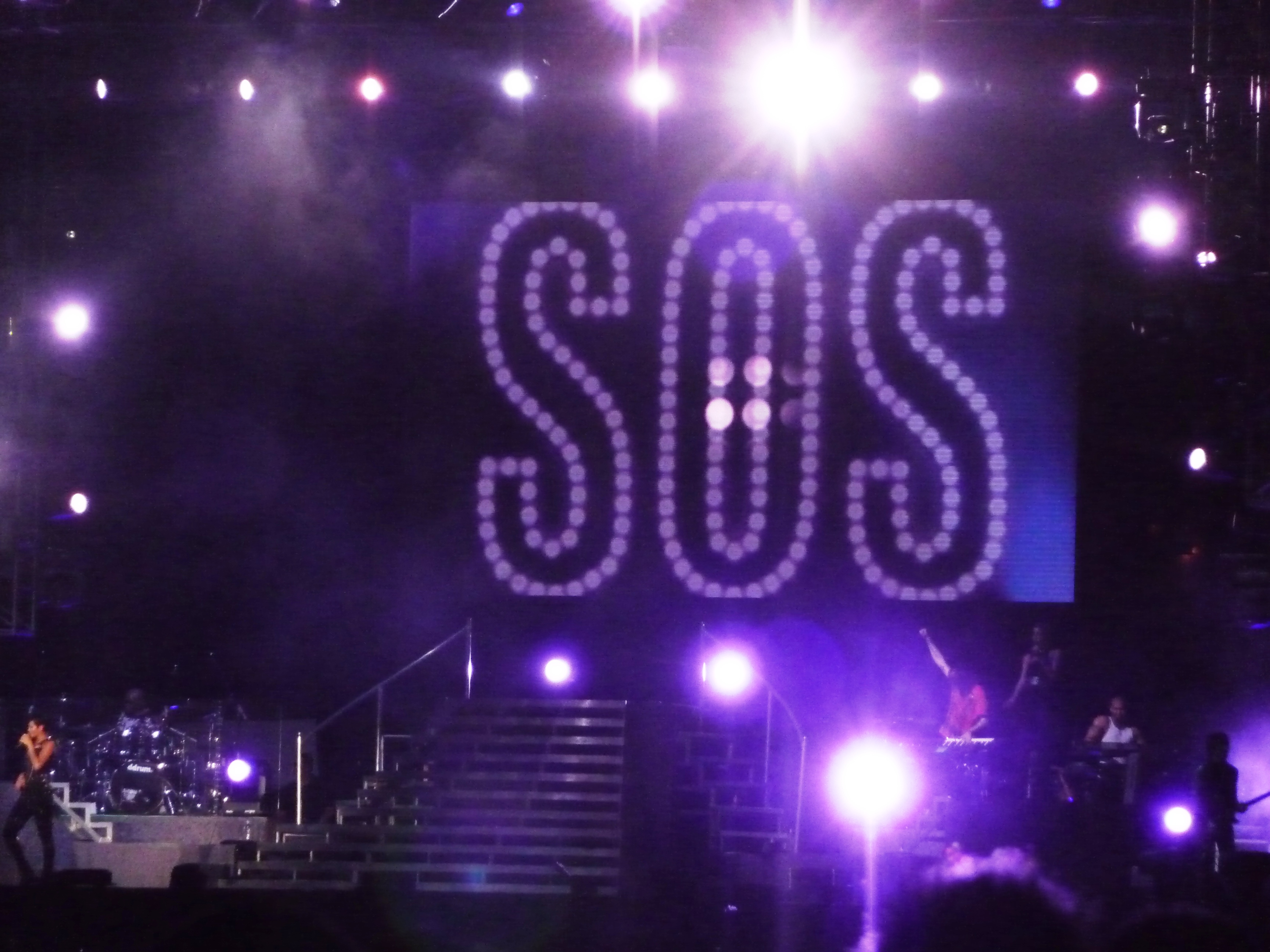
Rihanna performing "SOS"

The tour, directed and choreographed by Tina Landon, was the first tour headlined by Rihanna. It presented a whole new image as she wore very provocative and revealing leather costumes during each show. The stage was elaborate, consisting of a large set of stairs; two large LCD screens which showed images of Rihanna and special-made clips during the concert; and six slim LCD screens which were evenly spaced out, with three on the left and three on the right. The stage also consisted of thousands of lights which flashed in different colors, there was also a huge LCD screen in the middle of the stage which was mainly focused on Rihanna performing. The stage was packed with pyrotechnics and different on-stage props which Rihanna and the dancers used during their performances. Her back-up singers and band were on either side on the stage. During the Australia leg of the tour the stage also featured a small rising platform at the front center of the stage. For "Disturbia" she started high in the air on the platform, and rose on it again during "Unfaithful".

Akon was selected as the opening act for the tour in Canada during North America leg. The rest of the shows during the North American leg didn't have a supporting act. Ciara opened shows for Rihanna on all UK dates in December and David Jordan opened for her on all March UK dates. Adam Tensta joined Rihanna on her March 2008 European dates. Chris Brown joined Rihanna and performed a full set list at the Australia, New Zealand and Philippines leg of the tour. In Mexico City Mexican pop star María José opened the show with a four-song set: her first three singles and her then brand-new single, "No Soy Una Señora", and the Spanish Singer, David Bisbal sang with Rihanna the Spanish remix of "Hate That I Love You" in Mexico City. In December 2007, Rihanna cancelled the Good Girl Gone Bad concert in Nottingham, Birmingham and Bournemouth at very short notice under doctors orders. The Birmingham and Nottingham concerts were eventually rescheduled. During the Sydney, Australia concert on November 7, 2008, Rihanna ran off stage while performing "Umbrella" along with tourmate Chris Brown. TMZ reported that Rihanna may have felt ill due to air conditioning problem in the arena. The shows for February 12 and 13 in Asia were cancelled following Brown's assault on Rihanna.

== Critical reception ==
Mike Usinger, of The Georgia Straight, gave a mixed review of the concert at Vancouver, BC’s GM Place saying, "the Barbados-born knockout has plenty to learn about keeping an audience engaged." However, Usinger commented that the "kindest thing you can say about Rihanna is that she's shown some improvement since her last visit. For a start, she no longer seems tone-deaf." Jason MacNeil of Canadian Online Explorer gave a positive review of the concert’s intro and style, from Toronto’s Molson Amphitheatre, saying "the singer made a rather eye-popping impression, opening with ‘Pon de Replay’ and clad in a sexy, dominatrix-like studded black leather ensemble."

Regarding a cancelled Asian show, originally scheduled for February 13 in Malaysia’s capital city of Kuala Lumpur, the conservative Malaysian Islamic Party recommended that Rihanna's tour be barred from performing in the country due to her ‘skimpy’ outfits; ultimately, the show was cancelled due to the rising media coverage of Rihanna’s then-partner Chris Brown’s physical assault against her, with leaked police photos of Rihanna’s face appearing bruised and battered widely circulating in the media. Within the Asian market, the tour received mixed to positive reviews, with praise mainly being given for the live vocals by Rihanna and the overall theming, concept and fashions. Cheryl Leong, of MTV Southeast Asia, gave an average review of the show, commenting, "I did enjoy myself a whole lot at the concert. It just wasn't the most mindblowing. Nevertheless, she did what she does best, which is to bring out an entire collection of #1 singles 'live'."

== Broadcast and recordings ==
The 24 September 2007 show at Montréal's Bell Centre was recorded and broadcast via MSN Music, where it was also made available for download. It quickly became popular and broke several records, as it was viewed over one million times within the first week. Rihanna's concert was the most-streamed show by a single artist on MSN Music in 2007. Rihanna's concert in Ischgl, Austria, on 1 December 2007, was taped and aired on Austrian national television (ORF). The concert itself was free. The show at the Manchester Arena (in Manchester, UK) on 6 December 2007 was recorded and later released on June 17, 2008, as a live DVD titled Good Girl Gone Bad Live. The DVD also includes a behind-the-scenes documentary, featuring interviews with Rihanna, her band and crew, and their experiences on tour. The Manchester show would later air on Channel 4's Christmas Day programming for 2008. On November 16, 2008, the concert in Fort Bonifacio in Manila, Philippines, reached an at-home audience of more than 70k viewers. The concert was sponsored by MTV Philippines and Globe Telecom.

== Opening acts ==
- Akon (North America only)
- Kardinal Offishall (Canada only)
- Ray Lavender (London, Ontario, Canada)
- Kat DeLuna (Lincroft)
- Ciara (Europe only)
- DanceX (Selected Dates)
- David Jordan (Europe only)
- Chris Brown (the Philippines, Oceania)
- María José (Mexico)
- Sistanova (Germany)

== Set list ==
=== Original ===
The following set list is from the show on 15 September 2007 in Vancouver, BC. It is not intended to represent all dates throughout the tour.

1. "Pon de Replay"
2. "Break It Off"
3. "Let Me"
4. "Rehab"
5. "Breakin' Dishes"
6. "Is This Love"
7. "Kisses Don't Lie"
8. "Scratch"
9. "SOS"
10. "Good Girl Gone Bad"
11. "Hate That I Love You"
12. "Unfaithful"
13. "Sell Me Candy"
14. "Don't Stop the Music"
15. "Shut Up and Drive"
16. "Umbrella"

=== Revamped ===
Starting on October 27, 2008, a new set list was used for the concert.

1. "Disturbia" (contains samples from "Sweet Dreams (Are Made of This)" and excerpts from "Seven Nation Army")
2. "Breakin' Dishes"
3. "Break It Off"
4. "Let Me"
5. "Rehab"
6. "Pon de Replay"
7. "Paper Planes" (M.I.A cover)
8. "Doo Wop (That Thing)" (Lauryn Hill cover)
9. "Live Your Life"
10. "Scratch"
11. "SOS"
12. "Good Girl Gone Bad"
13. "Hate That I Love You"
14. "Unfaithful"
15. "Don't Stop the Music"
16. "Push Up On Me"
17. "Shut Up and Drive"
18. "Take a Bow"
19. "Umbrella"

=== Notes ===
- “Question Existing” was performed in Europe.
- Starting on November 11, 2007, “Push Up on Me” was added to the set list.
- ”Is This Love”, “Kisses Don’t Lie”, and “Sell Me Candy” were permanently cut on February 26, 2008.
- During shows in Mexico, David Bisbal performed “Hate That I Love You” with Rihanna.
- On select dates in Oceania, Asia, and Mexico, Chris Brown performed “Umbrella” with Rihanna.

== Shows ==
List of 2007 concerts
Date	City	Country	Venue
September 15 (Note: This concert is part of the Beat Bash.)	Vancouver	Canada	General Motors Place
September 17	Grande Prairie	Canada	Canada Games Arena
September 18	Calgary	Canada	Stampede Corral
September 19	Saskatoon	Canada	Credit Union Centre
September 22	Toronto	Canada	Molson Amphitheatre
September 23	London	Canada	John Labatt Centre
September 24	Montreal	Canada	Bell Centre
September 25	Québec City	Canada	Pavillon de la Jeunesse
September 27	Moncton	Canada	Moncton Coliseum
September 28	Saint John	Canada	Harbour Station
September 30	Halifax	Canada	Halifax Metro Centre
October 2	Arlington	United States	Texas Hall
October 5	Rochester	United States	RIT Gordon Field House
October 11	New York City	United States	Nokia Theatre
October 13	Lincroft	United States	Robert J. Collins Arena
October 18	University Park	United States	Bryce Jordan Center
October 19 (Note: This concert is part of the 2007 Power House Concert.)	Philadelphia	United States	Wachovia Center
October 20	Phoenix	United States	Arizona Veterans Memorial Coliseum
October 23	Anaheim	United States	House of Blues
November 11	Paris	France	Zénith de Paris
November 13	Munich	Germany	Zenith
November 14	Basel	Switzerland	St. Jakobshalle
November 20	Cologne	Germany	Palladium
November 21	Amsterdam	Netherlands	Heineken Music Hall
November 22	Brussels	Belgium	Forest National
November 23	Frankfurt	Germany	Jahrhunderthalle
November 24	Belgrade	Serbia	Belgrade Arena
November 26	Berlin	Germany	Columbiahalle
November 27	Bratislava	Slovakia	Sibamac Arena
November 30	Sofia	Bulgaria	Prince Alexander of Battenberg Square
December 1 (Note: This concert is part of Ischgl Open Season.)	Ischgl	Austria	Top of the Mountain Venue
December 2	Dublin	Ireland	RDS Simmonscourt
December 3	Belfast	Northern Ireland	Odyssey Arena
December 6	Manchester	England	Manchester Evening News Arena
December 7	Sheffield	England	Sheffield Arena
December 13	Newcastle	England	Metro Radio Arena
December 14	Glasgow	Scotland	Scottish Exhibition Hall 4
December 16	London	England	Wembley Arena
December 17	Brighton	England	Brighton Centre
December 18 (Note: The concert on 10 December 2007 at the NEC, Birmingham, was originally scheduled to take place on 18 December 2007.)	Birmingham	England	NEC Arena
December 19	Cardiff	Wales	Cardiff International Arena
December 20 (Note: The concert of December 8, 2007 at the Trent FM Arena in Nottingham was originally scheduled to take place on December 20, 2007.)	Nottingham	England	Trent FM Arena

List of 2008 concerts
Date (2008)	City	Country	Venue
February 26	Dublin	Ireland	RDS Simmonscourt
February 27	Dublin	Ireland	RDS Simmonscourt
March 2	Belfast	Northern Ireland	Odyssey Arena
March 3	Aberdeen	Scotland	Press and Journal Arena
March 5	Liverpool	England	Echo Arena
March 6 (Note: The concert of March 6, 2008 at the Windsor Hall in Bournemouth was originally scheduled to take place on December 4, 2007.)	Bournemouth	England	Windsor Hall
March 7	London	England	The O_{2} Arena
March 10	Ballerup	Denmark	Ballerup Super Arena
March 12	Stockholm	Sweden	Hovet
March 14	Helsinki	Finland	Hartwall Areena
March 16	Tallinn	Estonia	Saku Suurhall
March 17	Riga	Latvia	Arena Riga
March 19	Warsaw	Poland	Torwar Hall
March 20	Prague	Czech Republic	T-Mobile Arena
March 22	Düsseldorf	Germany	Philipshalle
March 23 (Note: The concert of March 23, 2008 at the Olympic Stadium in Moscow was originally scheduled to take place on December 21, 2007.)	Moscow	Russia	Olimpiysky
April 5	Chiba	Japan	Makuhari Event Hall
July 4 (Note: This show is part of the 2008 Essence Music Festival.)	New Orleans	United States	Louisiana Superdome
July 12	Casablanca	Morocco	Stade Mohammed V
July 15 (Note: This concert is part of MTV Mobile Bang Concert.)	Milan	Italy	Piazza Repubblica
October 27	Auckland	New Zealand	Vector Arena
October 28	Auckland	New Zealand	Vector Arena
October 29	Wellington	New Zealand	TSB Bank Arena
October 31	Brisbane	Australia	Brisbane Entertainment Centre
November 1	Brisbane	Australia	Brisbane Entertainment Centre
November 3	Adelaide	Australia	Adelaide Entertainment Arena
November 4	Melbourne	Australia	Rod Laver Arena
November 5	Melbourne	Australia	Rod Laver Arena
November 7	Sydney	Australia	Acer Arena
November 8	Sydney	Australia	Acer Arena
November 9	Sydney	Australia	Acer Arena
November 11	Perth	Australia	Burswood Dome
November 13	Singapore		Singapore Indoor Stadium
November 16	Taguig	Philippines	The Fort Bonifacio Open Field

List of 2009 concerts
Date (2009)	City	Country	Venue
January 22 (Note: The concert of January 22, 2009 at the Arena Monterrey in Monterrey was originally scheduled to take place on December 1, 2008.)	Monterrey	Mexico	Arena Monterrey
January 24 (Note: The concert of January 24, 2009 at the Palacio de los Deportes in Mexico City was originally scheduled to take place on December 3, 2008.)	Mexico City	Mexico	Palacio de los Deportes

=== Cancelled shows ===
Date	City	Country	Venue	Reason
November 14, 2008	Jakarta	Indonesia	Istora Gelora Bung Karno	Enforcement of travel warning to Indonesia as a result of the execution of 2002 Bali bombings convict
February 12, 2009	Jakarta	Indonesia	Istora Gelora Bung Karno	Chris Brown's assault on Rihanna
February 13, 2009	Kuala Lumpur	Malaysia	Axiata Arena	Chris Brown's assault on Rihanna
February 13, 2009	Kuala Lumpur	Malaysia	Axiata Arena	General protest by conservative Malaysian Islamic Party.

== Box office score data ==
Venue	City	Tickets sold / available	Gross revenue
Credit Union Centre	Saskatoon	6,997 / 7,282 (96%)	$289,319
Molson Amphitheatre	Toronto	8,337 / 8,337 (100%)	$416,759
Bell Centre	Montreal	10,427 / 10,427 (100%)	$634,982
Pavilion de la Jeuness	Quebec City	4,885 / 4,885 (100%)	$280,977
Moncton Coliseum	Moncton	5,512 / 5,512 (100%)	$298,782
Harbour Station	St. John	4,829 / 4,829 (100%)	$262,515
Halifax Metro Centre	Halifax	7,259 / 7,259 (100%)	$362,981
Bryce Jordan Center	University Park	6,984 / 10,400 (67%)	$174,550
Evening News Arena	Manchester	14,060 / 14,060 (100%)	$549,746
Sheffield Arena	Sheffield	9,889 / 11,369 (87%)	$386,660
Metro Radio Arena	Newcastle	10,562 / 10,673 (99%)	$373,874
Scottish Exhibition & Conference Centre	Glasgow	9,108 / 9,108 (100%)	$356,123
Wembley Arena	London	10,932 / 10,932 (100%)	$427,441
Brighton Centre	Brighton	3,762 / 3,762 (100%)	$147,094
National Indoor Arena	Birmingham	9,962 / 10,420 (96%)	$389,514
Cardiff International Arena	Cardiff	4,813 / 4,813 (100%)	$188,188
Trent FM Arena	Nottingham	7,518 / 7,527 (99%)	$293,954
Odyssey Arena	Belfast	11,654 / 13,846 (84%)	$455,671
Aberdeen Press & Journal Arena	Aberdeen	4,617 / 4,617 (100%)	$180,525
Echo Arena	Liverpool	9,630 / 9,630 (100%)	$370,043
Bournemouth International Centre	Bournemouth	6,500 / 6,500 (100%)	$254,150
The O_{2} Arena	London	13,570 / 16,100 (84%)	$530,587
Vector Arena	Auckland	19,757 / 23,928 (83%)	$333,763
TSB Bank Arena	Wellington	5,538 / 5,763 (96%)	$388,267
Brisbane Entertainment Centre	Brisbane	21,488 / 25,106 (86%)	$804,122
Adelaide Entertainment Centre	Adelaide	9,082 / 9,494 (96%)	$692,589
Rod Laver Arena	Melbourne Park	26,399 / 33,344 (79%)	$227,337
Burswood Dome	Perth	18,784 / 19,924 (94%)	$527,256
Fort Bonifacio Open Field	Taguig	70,000 / 70,000 (100%)	—N/a
Total		352,855 / 379,847 (93%)	$10,597,769

== Personnel ==
Crew on the road

- Tina Landon (director & choreographer)
- Antony Randall (Tour Director, Production director)
- JP Firmin (tour manager)
- Mark Dawson (security)
- Fankie Fuccile (stage manager)
- Alex MacLeod (tour accountant)
- Dave Berrera (stage tech)
- Alex Skowron (lighting director)
- TJ Thompson (rigger)
- Simon James (carpenter)
- David Kirkwood (front-of-house engineer)
- Ricky 'Bongos' Galecki (monitor engineer)
- Elizabeth Springer (wardrobe)

Band

- Rihanna (lead vocals)
- Kevin Hastings (keyboards)
- Eric Smith (bass)
- David Haddon (drums)
- Adam Ross (lead guitar)
- Richard Fortus (rhythm guitar September 2008–February 2009)
- Ashleigh Haney (backing vocals)
- Erica King (backing vocals)

Dancers

- Victoria Parsons (dance captain)
- Rachel Markarian
- Bryan Tanaka
- Julius Law

Styling

- Ursula Stephen (hair)
- Mylah Morales (makeup)
- Lysa Cooper (stylist)
- Mariel Haenn (stylist)
- Hollywood (stylist)
