= Break It Off =

2006 single by Rihanna

Single by Rihanna featuring Sean Paul

from the album A Girl like Me and The Trinity (Japanese special edition)
- Released: November 13, 2006
- Recorded: 2005–2006
- Studio: 2 Hard (Kingston, Jamaica)
- Genre: Electro-dancehall
- Length: 3:33
- Label: Def Jam; SRP
- Songwriters: Donovan Bennett; Sean Paul; K. Ford; Rihanna
- Producer: Don Corleon

Rihanna singles chronology
"We Ride" (2006)	"Break It Off" (2006)	"Roll It" (2007)

Sean Paul singles chronology
"(When You Gonna) Give It Up to Me" (2006)	"Break It Off" (2006)	"Give It to You" (2007)

"Break It Off" is a song by the Barbadian singer Rihanna from her second album A Girl like Me (2006), and features guest vocals from Jamaican rapper Sean Paul. It was written by Donovan Bennett, Paul, K. Ford and Rihanna, while production was handled by Don Corleon. The song was released on November 13, 2006, as the album's fourth and final single. "Break It Off" is a futuristic electro-dancehall song, which is layered over an electro-reggae beat.

Upon release, critical reception of the song was positive, with reviewers praising the collaboration between Rihanna and Paul and as a return to the former's roots. "Break It Off" reached number eight in Portugal and number nine in the US. Rihanna performed the song at Radio One Big Weekend in 2007 and it was included on the set list of her Good Girl Gone Bad Tour (2007–2009), and was subsequently included on the accompanying DVD release, entitled Good Girl Gone Bad Live.

== Background and release ==
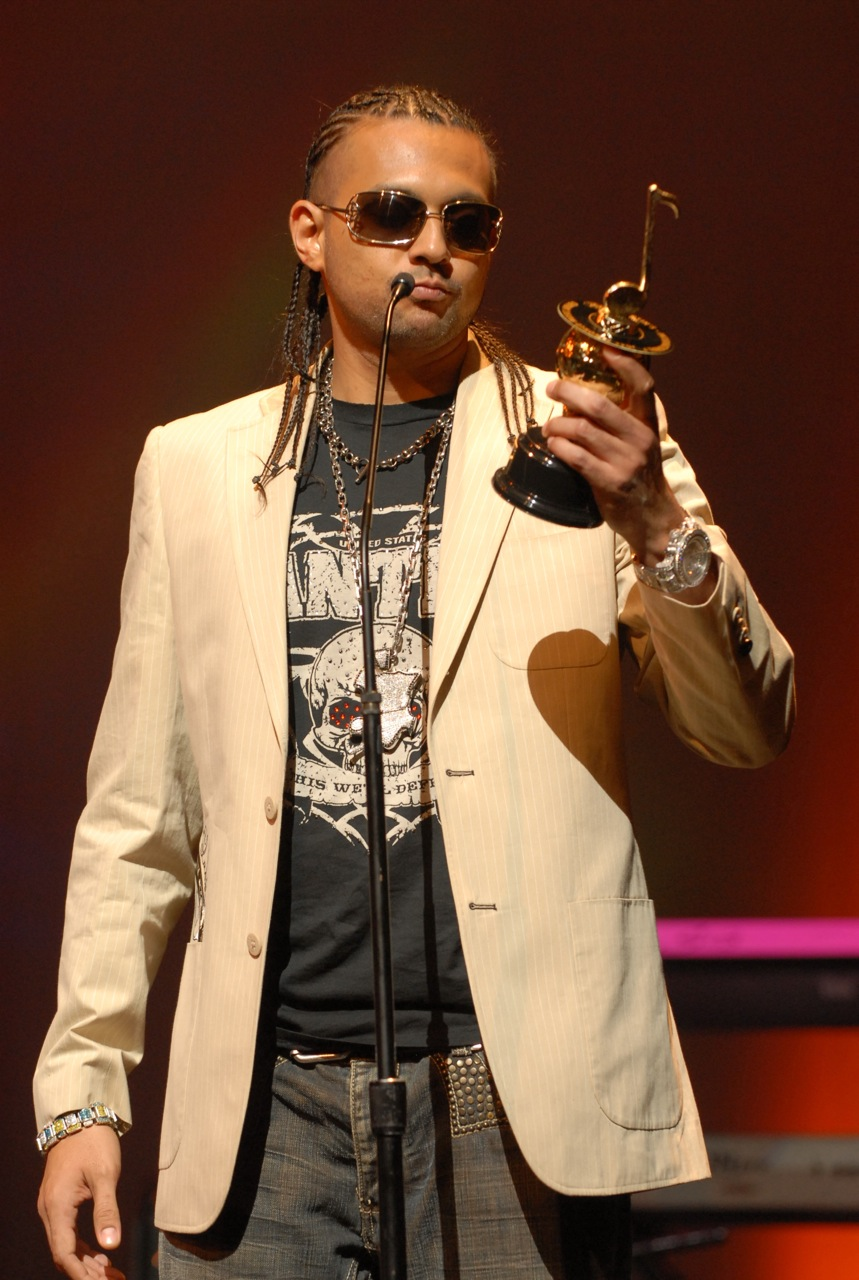
Sean Paul co-wrote and provided vocals on "Break It Off".

"Break It Off" was recorded at 2 Hard Studios in Kingston, Jamaica. It was written by Donovan Bennett, Sean Paul Henriques (better known as Sean Paul), K. Ford and Rihanna, who is credited as Robyn Fenty. Production of the song was handled by Don Corleon. It was engineered by Jeremy Harding and Bennett, who also mixed the song. All instrumentation was provided by Bennett. Paul explained how he and Rihanna met in a 2011 interview with Rap-Up. During her visit to Jamaica, Rihanna was taken on a tour around the island by Paul, where he took her to some of the beaches and experienced the nightlife. He continued to explain that they spent a few days together and that he took her to the Bob Marley Museum, which was something she had "always wanted to do." Reminiscing on "Break It Off" and Rihanna, Paul stated that working with the singer and creating the song was "his most memorable collaboration."

"Break It Off" was released as the fourth and final single from Rihanna's second studio album, A Girl like Me (2006). It was released to US Contemporary hit radio station playlists on November 13, 2006, by Def Jam Recordings. It was also made available to download digitally via iTunes in various countries around the world on February 27, 2007, including Australia, Austria, Belgium and Spain.

The song was later included on special editions of Paul's third studio album titled The Trinity.

== Composition and lyrics ==
"Break It Off" is a "futuristic" electro-dancehall song, which is layered over an electro-reggae beat. It received a comparison by Ruth Jamieson for The Guardian to Rihanna's debut single "Pon de Replay" from her first studio album, Music of the Sun. According to Dan Charnas for The Washington Post, "Break It Off" showcases Rihanna's Caribbean roots. "Break It Off" is written in the key of D-flat major and is set in common time with a moderate dance groove with 130 beats per minute (BPM). Rihanna's vocal range in the song spans one octave from the lower note of A_{3} to the higher note of A_{4}. The song includes piano keys and guitar strings as part of its instrumental composition.

== Critical reception ==
"Break It Off" garnered a positive response from music critics. David Jeffries for AllMusic was complimentary of "Break It Off", writing that it is "totally juiced" and that she provides good competition for Paul. Kelefa Sanneh for The New York Times praised the song, and described it as Rihanna's "triumphant return to her old formula." Quentin B. Huff for PopMatters lauded Sean Paul for his contribution to the song while praising Rihanna's hook, writing that "[Rihanna's] hook is so infectious that hers is the voice you ultimately remember. That's another dancehall-flavored song and another winner." Bill Lamb for About.com called "Break It Off", along with "Kisses Don't Lie", "candidates for widespread pop radio airplay".

== Chart performance ==
"Break It Off" debuted at number 40 on the US Pop Songs chart in the issue dated November 18, 2006. The following week, it ascended to number 35, and again to number 32 in its third week on the chart. "Break It Off" climbed into the top 30 at number 28 in its fourth week on December 9, 2006, and to number 25 in its fifth week. On December 23, 2006, the song climbed again to number 21, and reached its 2006 peak of number 16 on December 30, 2006. In the first chart issue of Billboard in January 2007, "Break It Off" charted at number 14. It broke into the top 10 on February 3, 2007, and ascended to number seven the following week. "Break It Off" peaked at number six on February 24, 2007. The song remained on the Pop Songs chart for a total of 22 weeks. On December 9, 2006, "Break It Off" debuted on the US Billboard Hot 100 chart at number 95. The song climbed to number 52 on March 3, 2007, and surged 42 chart positions to number 10 the following week. In its fourteenth week on the chart, the song peaked at number nine, and was awarded with the Digital Gainer honor. On March 24, 2007, the song debuted and peaked at number 10 in the Flanders region of Belgium.

== Live performances ==
Rihanna performed the song as part of a set list at Radio One Big Weekend in 2007. The set consisted of "Pon de Replay", "Break It Off", "SOS", "Breakin' Dishes", "Unfaithful", "Shut Up and Drive" and "Umbrella". "Break It Off" was also included on the set list of Rihanna's Good Girl Gone Bad Tour (2007–2009), and was later included on the DVD release, entitled Good Girl Gone Bad Live.

== Credits and personnel ==
Credits are adapted from the liner notes of A Girl Like Me, Def Jam Recordings, SRP Records.

- Songwriting – Donovan Bennett, Sean Paul Henriques, K. Ford, Robyn Fenty
- Production – Don Corleon
- Engineer – Jeremy Harding and Donovan Bennett
- Mixing – Donovan Bennett
- Instruments – Donovan Bennett

== Accolades ==
Accolades
Year	Ceremony	Award	Result	Ref.
2007	BMI London Awards	Award-Winning Songs	Won	
2008	BMI Pop Awards	Award-Winning Songs	Won	

== Charts ==
=== Weekly charts ===
Weekly chart performance
Chart (2007)	Peak position
Belgium (Ultratip Bubbling Under Flanders)	10
Canada Hot 100 (Billboard)	36
CIS Airplay (TopHit)	65
Hungary (Rádiós Top 40)	40
Romania (Romanian Top 100)	28
US Billboard Hot 100	9
US Pop Airplay (Billboard)	6
US Rhythmic Airplay (Billboard)	21

=== Year-end charts ===
Year-end chart performance
Chart (2007)	position
Romania (Romanian Top 100)	53
US Billboard Hot 100	85

== Certifications ==
Certifications and sales
Region	Certification	Certified units/sales
United States (RIAA)	Gold	500,000^{‡}
^{‡} Sales+streaming figures based on certification alone.

== Release history ==
Release dates and formats
Region	Date	Format	Label	Ref.
United States	November 13, 2006	Contemporary hit radio	Def Jam	
Australia	February 27, 2007	Digital download	Universal	
Austria	February 27, 2007	Digital download	Universal	
Belgium	February 27, 2007	Digital download	Universal	
Spain	February 27, 2007	Digital download	Universal	
