= Selfish Girl =

Selfish Girl may refer to:

- "Selfish Girl", a song by Charli XCX from Crash (Deluxe) (2022)
- "Selfish Girl", a song by Rihanna from A Girl like Me (2006)
