= Rihanna: Live in Concert =

2006 concert tour by Rihanna

- Continental tour by Rihanna
- Promotional poster for the tour
- Location: North America
- Associated album: Music of the Sun; A Girl like Me
- Start date: July 1, 2006
- End date: September 30, 2006
- Legs: 1
- No. of shows: 39
- Supporting acts: Field Mob; Jeannie Ortega; J-Status

Rihanna concert chronology
- Rihanna: Live in Concert (2006); Good Girl Gone Bad Tour (2007-09)

Rihanna: Live in Concert Tour was the debut concert tour by Barbadian singer Rihanna. The tour took place during the summer of 2006, supporting both her debut studio album Music of the Sun (2005) and her second studio album A Girl like Me (2006). It traveled across North America. During the final North American leg, Rihanna served as the opening act for the Black Eyed Peas' Monkey Business Tour.

== Opening acts ==
- Field Mob (select dates)
- Jeannie Ortega (select dates)
- J-Status (select dates)

== Tour dates ==
List of 2006 concerts
| Date | City | Country | Venue |
|---|---|---|---|
| June 30, 2006 | San Francisco | United States | Mezzanine |
| July 1, 2006 | San Diego | United States | House of Blues |
| July 2, 2006 | West Hollywood | United States | House of Blues |
| July 3, 2006 | Las Vegas | United States | House of Blues |
| July 5, 2006 | Salt Lake City | United States | Club Vortex |
| July 8, 2006 | Minneapolis | United States | Quest Club |
| July 10, 2006 | Cleveland | United States | House of Blues |
| July 13, 2006 | Allentown | United States | Crocodile Rock Cafe |
| July 14, 2006^{[A]} | Ottawa | Canada | Festival Plaza |
| July 15, 2006 | Belleville | Canada | Matt and Joe's Nightclub |
| July 16, 2006^{[B]} | Vaughan | Canada | Kingswood Music Theatre |
| July 18, 2006^{[C]} | Darien | United States | Darien Lake Performing Arts Center |
| July 21, 2006 | Valdosta | United States | All-Star Amphitheater |
| July 22, 2006^{[D]} | Montego Bay | Jamaica | Montego Bay Sports Complex |
| July 23, 2006 | Winter Haven | United States | Star Haven Amphitheatre |
| July 24, 2006 | Lake Buena Vista | United States | House of Blues |
| July 25, 2006 | Fort Lauderdale | United States | Revolution Live |
| July 26, 2006 | Atlanta | United States | Coca-Cola Roxy Theatre |
| July 28, 2006 | Baltimore | United States | Rams Head Live! |
| July 29, 2006^{[E]} | Toms River | United States | Day Stage |
| August 1, 2006 | New York City | United States | Nokia Theatre |
| August 2, 2006 | Englewood | United States | Bergen Performing Arts Center |
| August 3, 2006 | Boston | United States | Avalon |
| August 5, 2006 | Ledyard | United States | Fox Theatre |
| August 6, 2006 | Providence | United States | Lupo's Heartbreak Hotel |
| August 8, 2006^{[F]} | Jackson | United States | Jackson County Fairgrounds |
| August 11, 2006 | Chicago | United States | Park West |
| August 13, 2006 | Milwaukee | United States | Rave Hall |
| August 17, 2006 | Gilford | United States | Meadowbrook Musical Arts Center |
| August 19, 2006^{[G]} | Saint-Jean-sur-Richelieu | Canada | Parc Pierre-Trahan |
| September 1, 2006 | Jackson | United States | Northern Star Arena |
| September 2, 2006 | Buffalo | United States | Club Infinity |
| September 3, 2006 | Sterling Heights | United States | Freedom Hill Amphitheatre |
| September 15, 2006 | Honolulu | United States | Pipeline Cafe |
| September 16, 2006^{[H]} | Pomona | United States | Los Angeles County Fairgrounds |
| September 17, 2006^{[I]} | Princeton | United States | Quadrangle Club |
| September 22, 2006 | Atlantic City | United States | House of Blues |
| September 29, 2006 | St. Louis | United States | Bauman-Eberhardt Center |
| September 30, 2006^{[J]} | Boston | United States | Agganis Arena |

Festivals and other miscellaneous performances
^{A} This concert was a part of the "Cisco Systems Blues Festival"
^{B} This concert was a part of Z103.5's 14th Annual Pizza Pizza Summer Rush
^{C} This concert was a part of WKSE's "Kiss the Summer Hello"
^{D} This concert was a part of "Reggae Sumfest"
^{E} This concert was a part "Toms River Fest"
^{F} This concert was a part of the "Jackson County Fair"
^{G} This concert was a part of the International de montgolfières de Saint-Jean-sur-Richelieu
^{H} This concert was a part of the "End of Summer Concert Series"
^{I} This concert was a part of "Lawnparties"
^{J} This concert was a part of "Mixfest"
