= We Ride =

2006 single by Rihanna

Single by Rihanna

from the album A Girl like Me
- Released: August 21, 2006
- Recorded: 2006
- Studio: Battery (New York City, New York); The Loft Recording (Bronxville, New York); Blue Wave (Saint Philip, Barbados); Hinge (Chicago, Illinois)
- Genre: Hip-hop; soul; R&B
- Length: 3:46 (album version); 3:56 (radio edit)
- Label: Def Jam; SRP
- Songwriters: Makeba Riddick; Mikkel S. Eriksen; Tor Erik Hermansen
- Producer: Stargate

Rihanna singles chronology
"Unfaithful" (2006)	"We Ride" (2006)	"Break It Off" (2006)

Music video
- "We Ride" on YouTube

"We Ride" is a song by the Barbadian singer Rihanna from her second album A Girl like Me (2006). It was written by Makeba Riddick, Mikkel S. Eriksen and Tor Erik Hermansen, with production helmed by Stargate. The song was released on August 21, 2006, as the album's third single. "We Ride" is a hip-hop, soul and R&B ballad. Critical reception was generally positive, praising the track's relaxing and carefree qualities, though Rihanna herself has since admitted to disliking the track.

"We Ride" peaked inside the Top 40 on multiple charts, including Australia, the Flanders and Wallonia regions of Belgium and the United Kingdom. The song peaked inside Top 10 in Finland and New Zealand. Despite failing to chart on the US Billboard Hot 100 chart, the song peaked atop the Dance Club Songs chart and peaked at number 34 on the Pop Airplay chart. The song's accompanying video was directed by Anthony Mandler, and shot in Miami and the Florida Keys. The video features Rihanna in various scenes, including a beach, nightclub and socialising with friends.

== Background and release ==
"We Ride" was written by Makeba Riddick, Mikkel S. Eriksen and Tor Erik Hermansen, with production helmed by Eriksen and Hermansen under their stage name Stargate. Rihanna explained the reasoning behind "We Ride" being chosen as the third single from the album in an interview with Corey Moss of MTV. The singer stated that instead of asking her record label and management which song should be released after "Unfaithful", Rihanna looked on iTunes to see which was her most downloaded song after the album's lead single "SOS" and "Unfaithful" and stated that "We Ride" was the third most popular, saying "Out of all my songs available for sale on iTunes, [We Ride was] the third most downloaded, behind 'SOS' and 'Unfaithful,' ... It's having good feedback, so I'm gonna give fans what they want." "We Ride" was released as the third single from the album to US mainstream and rhythmic radio stations on August 21, 2006, and was released in certain European territories as a CD single throughout October and November 2006. In Australia, the song was released as an extended play (EP) on October 30, 2006, which featured remixes of "We Ride" and the previous single from the album, "Unfaithful".

== Composition and lyrics ==
As a mid-tempo ballad, "We Ride" is a hip hop, soul and "urban" R&B song. According to the digital sheet music published by Musicnotes.com, "We Ride" is written in the key of E♭ major and is set in common time with a moderate dance groove with 150 beats per minute (BPM). Rihanna's vocal range in the song spans from the lower note of G♯_{3} to the higher note of C_{5}. The song includes piano keys and guitar strings as part of its instrumental composition, and were provided by Stargate. Jazzily Bass of Contactmusic.com commented that "We Ride" incorporates a "teen music sound" into its composition, which features a melodic tap to keep the listener engaged. In an interview with Corey Moss of MTV, Rihanna explained the meaning behind the song's lyrics, saying:

'We Ride' is about this guy saying over and over again, 'When we ride, we ride, we're gonna be together until the day that we die' — promising all these things ... then it turns out he broke all of his promises, which is sad — but it's summer and I don't care if you wanna do that and be ugly and unfaithful, then I can just do my thing, chill with my girls and have fun. That's what summers are all about ... every summer you remember a certain relationship and there's always a song to connect to that. So 'We Ride' is just one of those songs.

== Critical reception ==
"We Ride" received positive reviews from music critics. David Jeffries of AllMusic praised "We Ride", writing that the song is "an easy-flowing weekend cruiser". Spence D. of IGN similarly noted that "We Ride" is a song to which someone can listen to whilst driving, writing that it is a "ubiquitous cruising track that reworks the cliché catch phrase of the new millennium: 'we ride till the day that we die.'" Bill Lamb of About.com noted that "We Ride" would appeal most to urban audiences due to its hip-hop composition. However, Sal Cinquemani of Slant Magazine was critical of "We Ride", writing that although the song is a "hip hop-influenced club banger", it appeared to be too mature for the singer and her "minor vocal talents".

== Chart performance ==
In Australia, the song debuted and peaked at number 24 on November 19, 2006. The following week, the song remained at number 24 and spent a total of ten weeks on the singles chart, with its last chart appearance at number 43 on January 21, 2007. In New Zealand, "We Ride" debuted at number 16 on December 12, 2006, and rose to number 8 the following week. In its third week charting, the song fell to number 10, but peaked at number 7 in its fourth week. After having spent eleven weeks on the chart, "We Ride" dropped out of the Top 40 singles chart, however, the song re-entered the chart at number 37 on February 26, 2007, for one week.

In Europe, "We Ride" charted moderately in several territories. In the Netherlands, the song debuted at number 89 on November 25, 2006, and peaked at number 60 the following week. Over the following six weeks, the song fluctuated on the lower region on the singles chart, and spent a total of eight weeks on the chart. In the Flanders region of Belgium, the song debuted at number 46 on December 16, 2006, where it remained for a further week. In its third week charting, "We Ride" peaked at number 40. The song re-entered the singles chart at number 43 on January 20, 2007, where it remained for a further week before dropping out of the singles chart. In the Wallonia region of Belgium, the song debuted at number 34 on December 9, 2006, and rose by one chart position to number 33 the following week, where it remained in its third week. "We Ride" peaked at number 26 in its fourth week on the singles chart. In Switzerland, "We Ride" debuted and peaked at number 42 on December 17, 2006. After having spent seven weeks on the chart, "We Ride" dropped out of the singles chart, however, the song re-entered the chart at number 95 on February 11, 2007, for one week. In Finland, the song debuted peaked at number 4 in the final week of December 2006; "We Ride" spent one week on the singles chart. In Italy, the song debuted and peaked on that countries singles chart at number 16 on October 9, 2008, more than two years after the song's release as a single; "We Ride" spent one week on the singles chart. The song peaked at number 96 on the European Hot 100 Singles chart.

In the United Kingdom, "We Ride" debuted at number 55 on October 28, 2006, and peaked at number 17 the next week. It fell to number 34 the following week, spending a total of two weeks inside the official UK Top 40. In the United States, the song failed to make a chart appearance on the Billboard Hot 100 chart, but managed to chart on the Dance Club Songs chart and Pop Airplay chart. The song peaked at number 1 on the Dance Club Songs chart on February 3, 2007, and spent a total of eighteen weeks on the chart. On the Pop Airplay chart, "We Ride" peaked at number 34.

== Music video ==
=== Background and release ===
The music video for "We Ride" was filmed in Miami and the Florida Keys on August 1-2, 2006. It was directed by Anthony Mandler, the director of the previous single's video, "Unfaithful". In an interview with Corey Moss of MTV, Rihanna explained the concept behind the inspiration for the video, saying, "We just wanted to reconnect with my peers, let them know I'm still a teen, I still have friends – but to make something provocative. The '[SOS]' and 'Unfaithful' [concepts] were so out there, so we pulled it back a little bit. I'm chilling with my girls some." The singer continued to talk about the choreographic content, saying, "I'm dancing [in the video], like technical dance, which was a challenge ... It usually takes years to learn, but we got it done in a few days. And it was beautifully shot." The video was released to download via iTunes on September 18, 2006, in Ireland and September 20, 2006, in the United States.

=== Synopsis ===
In the video, Rihanna incorporates professionally choreographed dance routines in front of a white backdrop.

The video begins with Rihanna walking towards a white Jeep Wrangler, but stops due to her mobile phone ringing. As Rihanna answers, she converses with a male friend, presumably her boyfriend. As she tells him that she needs to do some things before meeting with him, Rihanna hangs up and the screen cuts to a black screen. As a visual of Rihanna driving along a bridge in the Florida Keys, the song begins to play. During the first verse, different scenes are intercut of Rihanna, including a close-up shot of the singer driving behind the wheel is shown, walking along the beach and dancing in a black dress against a white backdrop, as she sings about how her boyfriend has been seeing another girl without Rihanna knowing. For the first chorus, in addition to the other three scenes, one shot is shown of Rihanna dancing with a man in a nightclub. During the second verse, Rihanna is shown lying down on the beach and playing in the water, as well as dancing with a male dancer against a white backdrop, this time wearing a lace dress.

For the second chorus, a new scene of Rihanna is introduced, with Rihanna meeting with her friends, having arrived at her destination, where they eat in restaurant and walk down the street. During the bridge, as Rihanna sings about the difficulties of getting over a failed relationship, scenes of Rihanna partying and talking to her ex-boyfriend on her phone are depicted, which results in her agreeing to meet him as she sings "Just blame yourself 'cause you blew it/I won't forget how you do it, my sweet baby/This is where the game ends now/But somehow wanna believe you and me/We can figure it out", as she decides that their relationship is worth salvaging. During the final chorus, the singer is shown intimately dancing and partying with her boyfriend, whilst other scenes from the video are intercut. The video ends with a close-up shot of Rihanna against a white backdrop; when the song's audio finishes, the singer turns her head to the side and looks into the distance, as the camera pans away.

== Track listings ==
- CD
1. "We Ride" — 3:58
2. "Unfaithful" (Nu Soul remix) — 6:55
- Maxi CD
1. "We Ride" (radio edit) — 3:58
2. "We Ride" (Stargate remix) — 4:01
3. "We Ride" (Lenny B club mix) — 8:26
4. "We Ride" (video)

- Digital download
1. "We Ride" (No Hi Hat) — 3:56
2. "Unfaithful" (Nu Soul remix) — 6:55
- Digital download (extended play)
1. "We Ride" (radio edit) — 3:56
2. "We Ride" (Stargate remix) — 3:57
3. "We Ride" (Lenny B club mix) — 8:23

== Credits and personnel ==
Credits are adapted from the liner notes of A Girl Like Me, Def Jam Recordings, SRP Records.

Recording

- Recorded at Battery Studios, New York City, New York; The Loft Recording Studios, Bronxville, New York; Blue Wave Studio, Saint Philip, Barbados; and Hinge Studios, Chicago, Illinois.

Personnel

- Songwriting – Makeba Riddick, Mikkel Eriksen, Tor Erik Hermansen
- Production – Stargate
- Vocal engineering and recording – Mikkel Eriksen, Al Hemberger, James Auwarter
- Mixing – Phil Tan
- Vocal production – Evan Rogers, Carl Sturken
- Instruments – Mikkel Eriksen, Tor Erik Hermansen
- Lead and background vocals – Rihanna

== Charts ==
=== Weekly charts ===
Weekly chart performance
Chart (2006–2007)	Peak position
Australia (ARIA)	24
Australian Urban (ARIA)	7
Belgium (Ultratop 50 Flanders)	40
Belgium (Ultratop 50 Wallonia)	26
Czech Republic Airplay (ČNS IFPI)	14
Finland (Suomen virallinen lista)	4
Germany (GfK)	45
Ireland (IRMA)	17
Italy (FIMI)	16
Netherlands (Dutch Top 40 Tipparade)	2
Netherlands (Single Top 100)	60
New Zealand (Recorded Music NZ)	7
Romania (Romanian Top 100)	22
Scottish Singles Sales (Official Charts)	18
Slovakia Airplay (ČNS IFPI)	14
Switzerland (Schweizer Hitparade)	42
UK Singles (Official Charts)	17
UK Hip Hop/R&B (Official Charts)	4
US Bubbling Under Hot 100 (Billboard)	7
US Dance Club Songs (Billboard)	1
US Pop Airplay (Billboard)	34
US Rhythmic Airplay (Billboard)	27

=== Year-end charts ===
2006 year-end chart performance
Chart (2006)	Position
Australian Urban (ARIA)	45

2007 year-end chart performance
Chart (2007)	Position
US Dance Club Play (Billboard)	17

== Certifications ==
Certifications
Region	Certification	Certified units/sales
Australia (ARIA)	Platinum	70,000^{‡}
New Zealand (RMNZ)	Platinum	30,000^{‡}
United Kingdom (BPI)	Silver	200,000^{‡}
United States (RIAA)	Gold	500,000^{‡}
^{‡} Sales+streaming figures based on certification alone.

== Release history ==
Release dates and formats
Region	Date	Format(s)	Label	Ref.
United States	August 21, 2006	Contemporary hit radio; rhythmic contemporary radio	Def Jam	
United Kingdom	October 30, 2006	CD	Mercury	
Australia	November 6, 2006	CD	Universal	
Germany	November 17, 2006	CD	Universal	

== See also ==
- List of Billboard Hot Dance Club Play number ones of 2007
