= MTV Mobile =

- Industry: Mobile virtual network operator
- Founded: 2008; 17 years ago
- Headquarters: Italy
- Area served: Italy; Netherlands
- Website: Netherlands Site; Italian Site

MTV Mobile was a Netherlands/Italy-based Mobile virtual network operator. The network was launched in 2008 by the owner MTV Italy (under Viacom license) and based on Telecom Italia Mobile network in Italy, and in 2009, by MTV Benelux based on the KPN network.

The network also offered special editions of the Sony Ericsson W760, Nokia 5320, Samsung C6620, Nokia N73 and ASUS Eee PC 901 in Italy.

At the end of March 2012, thanks to an agreement between MTV and Polska Telefonia Cyfrowa (now T-Mobile Polska), MTV Mobile also appeared in Poland. From November 2013, the stagnation process began, and at the beginning of 2014, the customer base was migrated to the T-Mobile network.
