= Makeba Riddick =

American singer-songwriter

- Born: November 22, 1981 (age 44); Baltimore, Maryland, U.S.
- Genres: R&B; pop; soul
- Occupations: Singer; songwriter; vocal producer
- Instruments: Keyboards; sampler
- Years active: 2002–present
- Labels: Bad Boy; EMI; Roc Nation
- Member of: Cocaine 80s

Makeba Riddick-Woods (born November 22, 1981), also known as Girl Wonder, is an American songwriter and singer who has been active in the music industry since 2002. Born and raised in West Baltimore, Maryland, she signed with Jay-Z's Roc Nation in 2008.

== Background ==
Riddick attended the Baltimore School for the Arts before graduating from Berklee College of Music (Boston) with a bachelor's degree in Music Management. She moved to New York City to develop her career as a songwriter. Her early break came from songwriting and singing background vocals for 3LW, Jennifer Lopez and B2K.

== Songwriting and vocal production ==
Riddick is best known for her work with multi-platinum selling pop artist Rihanna for whom she has vocally produced and collaborated on three albums with, including A Girl like Me, Music of the Sun and Good Girl Gone Bad. She co-wrote and vocally produced the star's reggae-influenced song "Rude Boy" from Rihanna's fourth studio album, Rated R. She also produced vocals for all the remaining tracks on the album and co-wrote the intro track "Mad House".

Riddick has also collaborated with French DJ-come-producer David Guetta, first on the song "If We Ever" which is also her first solo credited vocal performance and taken from Guetta's 2009 Grammy-nominated album One Love. She also worked with Guetta to produce tracks for R&B singer Kelis's album Flesh Tone including the lead single and U.S. Dance Chart topper "Acapella". Riddick's other writing and production credits include Danity Kane's eponymous album; Beyoncé's U.S. radio hit "Get Me Bodied" from her second album B'Day; Braxton's 2005 album Libra and Jennifer Lopez's 2005 album Rebirth as well as platinum-selling work for Mariah Carey. She also worked in the studio with Rodney "Darkchild" Jerkins on material for Diddy – Dirty Money's delayed album Last Train to Paris.

Additionally, she has worked on records for the British girl group Sugababes on the song "About a Girl" taken from their seventh studio album Sweet 7. The collaboration reached the top ten in the UK. In America, Riddick was reunited with Toni Braxton when a record she wrote, "Make My Heart" was released by Braxton as the second single from the star's upcoming album Pulse.

Makeba produced Rihanna's vocals for Eminem's single "Love the Way You Lie".

== Solo career ==
She is said to be releasing her own debut solo single titled "Change Up" which will be produced by Darkchild and will serve as the lead single from the producer's collaborative project, The Writersproject Volume 1.

== Production and writing credits ==
| Date | Artist | Song | Album | Label |
|---|---|---|---|---|
| 2002 | Jennifer Lopez | "All I Have" | This Is Me... Then | Epic Records |
| 2002 | B2K | "You Can Get It" | Pandemonium! | Epic Records |
| 2002 | 3LW | "Ghetto Love & Heartbreak" | A Girl Can Mack | Epic Records |
| 2005 | Mariah Carey | "So Lonely (One & Only Part 2) | The Emancipation of Mimi | Island Records |
| 2005 | Jennifer Lopez | "Hold You Down" | Rebirth | Epic Records |
| 2005 | Toni Braxton | "Please" | Libra | Blackground Records |
| 2005 | Teairra Mari | "M.V.P." | Roc-A-Fella Records Presents Teairra Marí | Roc-A-Fella |
| 2005 | Rihanna | "If It's Lovin' That You Want" | Music of the Sun | Def Jam Records |
| 2005 | Rihanna | "Let Me" | Music of the Sun | Def Jam Records |
| 2006 | Rihanna | "We Ride" | A Girl like Me | Def Jam Records |
| 2006 | Rihanna | "Unfaithful" | A Girl like Me | Def Jam Records |
| 2006 | Danity Kane | "Touching My Body" | Danity Kane | Bad Boy Records |
| 2006 | Danity Kane | "Stay with Me" | Danity Kane | Bad Boy Records |
| 2006 | Jessica Simpson | "I Don't Want to Care" | A Public Affair | Columbia Records |
| 2006 | Fantasia | "Surround You" | Fantasia | J Records |
| 2006 | JoJo | "Let It Rain" | The High Road | Universal Records |
| 2006 | Taylor Hicks | "Heaven Knows" | Taylor Hicks | J Records |
| 2006 | Cassie | "Can't Do It Without You" | Cassie | Bad Boy Records |
| 2006 | Letoya Luckett | "I'm Good" | LeToya | Capitol Records |
| 2006 | Brooke Hogan | "Next Time" | Undiscovered | SMC, SoBe Entertainment |
| 2007 | Beyoncé | "Déjà Vu" | B'Day | Columbia Records |
| 2007 | Beyoncé | "Get Me Bodied" | B'Day | Columbia Records |
| 2007 | Beyoncé | "Suga Mama" | B'Day | Columbia Records |
| 2007 | Beyoncé | "Upgrade U" | B'Day | Columbia Records |
| 2007 | Beyoncé | "Creole" | B'Day | Columbia Records |
| 2007 | Beyoncé | "World Wide Woman" | B'Day | Columbia Records |
| 2007 | Rihanna | "Disturbia" | Good Girl Gone Bad | Def Jam Records |
| 2007 | Rihanna | "Sell Me Candy" | Good Girl Gone Bad | Def Jam Records |
| 2007 | Rihanna | "Say It" | Good Girl Gone Bad | Def Jam Records |
| 2007 | Rihanna | "Push Up On Me" | Good Girl Gone Bad | Def Jam Records |
| 2007 | Rihanna | "Question Existing" | Good Girl Gone Bad | Def Jam Records |
| 2007 | The Cheetah Girls | "Do No Wrong" | TCG | Hollywood Records |
| 2007 | Katharine McPhee | "Do What You Do" | Katharine McPhee | RCA |
| 2008 | T.I. | "Live Your Life" | Paper Trail | Grand Hustle Records |
| 2008 | Michelle Williams | "Stop This Car" | Unexpected | Columbia Records |
| 2008 | Girlicious | "Baby Doll" | Girlicious | Geffen Records |
| 2008 | Beyoncé | "Ave Maria" | I Am...Sasha Fierce | Columbia Records |
| 2008 | Solange Knowles | "Would've Been The One" | Sol-Angel and the Hadley St. Dreams | Geffen Records/Music World Entertainment |
| 2008 | Solange Knowles | "Ode To Marvin" | Sol-Angel and the Hadley St. Dreams | Geffen Records/Music World Entertainment |
| 2009 | Rihanna | "Mad House" | Rated R | Def Jam Records |
| 2009 | Rihanna | "Rude Boy" | Rated R | Def Jam Records |
| 2009 | David Guetta | "If We Ever" | One Love | Virgin Records |
| 2009 | Jadakiss | "Hustle Hard" | The Last Kiss | Def Jam Records/Roc-A-Fella |
| 2009 | Wale | "Chillin'" | Attention Deficit | Interscope Records |
| 2009 | Tynisha Keli | "RockStar" | The Chronicles of TK | Warner Bros. Records |
| 2010 | Sugababes | "About a Girl" | Sweet 7 | Island Records, Roc Nation |
| 2010 | Kelis | "Acapella" | Flesh Tone | will.i.am Music Group |
| 2010 | Nicki Minaj | "Muny" | Pink Friday | Young Money Entertainment/Republic Records |
| 2010 | Toni Braxton | "Make My Heart" | Pulse | Atlantic Records |
| 2010 | Toni Braxton | "Lookin' At Me" | Pulse | Atlantic Records |
| 2010 | Toni Braxton | "The Wave" | Pulse | Atlantic Records |
| 2010 | Eminem | "Love the Way You Lie" | Recovery | Aftermath Entertainment, Shady Records |
| 2010 | Rihanna | "Cheers (Drink To That)" | Loud | Def Jam |
| 2010 | Rihanna | "Skin" | Loud | Def Jam |
| 2011 | Jennifer Lopez | "Take Care" | Love? | Island Def Jam |
| 2011 | Common | "Blue Sky" | The Dreamer/The Believer | Def Jam, Warner Bros. |
| 2011 | Common | "Raw (How You Like It)" | The Dreamer/The Believer | Def Jam, Warner Bros. |
| 2012 | Rita Ora | "Uneasy" | Ora | Roc Nation, Columbia |
| 2012 | Rita Ora | "Young, Single & Sexy" | Ora | Roc Nation, Columbia |
| 2013 | Coco Jones | "Holla At The DJ" | Made Of EP | Hollywood Records |
| 2013 | Coco Jones | "Made Of" | Made Of EP | Hollywood Records |
| 2013 | Tamar Braxton | "Hot Sugar" | Love and War | Streamline Records/Interscope |
| 2013 | Tamar Braxton | "Love and War" | Love and War | Streamline Records/Interscope |
| 2013 | Tamar Braxton | "She Did That" | Love and War | Streamline Records/Interscope |
| 2013 | Jessica Sanchez | "No One Compares (Featuring Prince Royce)" | Me, You & the Music | Interscope |
| 2013 | Prince Royce | "Already Missing You (Featuring Selena Gomez)" | Soy el Mismo | Sony Music Latin |
| 2013 | Zara Larsson | "Cash Me Out" | Allow Me to Reintroduce Myself | TEN Music Group/Universal Music Group |
| 2015 | Tamar Braxton | "If I Don't Have You" | Calling All Lovers | Streamline Records/Epic Records |
| 2015 | Tamar Braxton | "Must Be Good To You" | Calling All Lovers | Streamline Records/Epic Records |
| 2015 | Tamar Braxton | "A.S.A.P" | Calling All Lovers | Streamline Records/Epic Records |
| 2016 | Lion Babe | "Jump Hi" | Begin | Interscope Records/Polydor |
| 2017 | Star Cast | "Unlove You" | Star (Season 1) Soundtrack | Epic Records |
| 2017 | Tamar Braxton | "Run Run" | Bluebird of Happiness | Streamline Records/Epic Records |
| 2017 | Tamar Braxton | "Pick Me Up" | Bluebird of Happiness | Streamline Records/Epic Records |
| 2018 | Koryn Hawthorne | "Unstoppable" | Unstoppable | RCA Inspiration/Sony Music |
| 2018 | Koryn Hawthorne | "Won't He Do It (Remix)" | Unstoppable | RCA Inspiration/Sony Music |

Source: Source:
