= A Girl Like Me (Rihanna album) =

Studio album by Rihanna
- Released: April 10, 2006
- Recorded: 2005–2006
- Genres: Pop; dancehall; R&B
- Length: 50:30
- Labels: SRP; Def Jam
- Producers: The Conglomerate; Don Corleon; Mike City; Poke and Tone; Jonathan "J.R." Rotem; Evan Rogers; Stargate; Carl Sturken

Rihanna chronology
Music of the Sun (2005)	A Girl Like Me (2006)	Good Girl Gone Bad (2007)

Singles from A Girl Like Me
- 1. "SOS" Released: February 13, 2006; 2. "Unfaithful" Released: May 1, 2006; 3. "We Ride" Released: August 21, 2006; 4. "Break It Off" Released: November 13, 2006

A Girl Like Me is the second studio album by Barbadian singer Rihanna. It was released on April 10, 2006, by SRP Records and Def Jam Recordings. For the production of the album, Rihanna worked with Evan Rogers, Carl Sturken, Stargate, J. R. Rotem, and label-mate Ne-Yo. A Girl Like Me is a pop, dancehall and R&B album influenced by Rihanna's Caribbean roots. The album also incorporates elements of rock music, as well as ballads, which music critics were ambivalent towards.

Some critics gave the album positive reviews, stating that Rihanna gracefully avoided the sophomore disappointment while others compared the album to her previous effort. A Girl Like Me was released less than eight months after Rihanna's debut album. It peaked at number five on the US Billboard 200 and on the UK Albums Chart. The album was successful in other countries as well, entering the top ten in Ireland, New Zealand, Australia and Japan, while topping the Canadian Albums Chart.

A Girl Like Me spawned four singles: "SOS", which became Rihanna's first single to reach number one on the US Billboard Hot 100, "Unfaithful" and "Break It Off", both reaching the top ten on the Billboard Hot 100. However, the album's third single, "We Ride", failed to reprise the success of the album's other singles. The album was re-released as an expanded two-disc deluxe package in Germany, which includes remixes to both Rihanna's debut single, "Pon de Replay", and "If It's Lovin' That You Want". The album has been certified 2× Platinum by the Recording Industry Association of America (RIAA). To promote both A Girl Like Me and her debut record, Rihanna embarked on her debut headlining concert tour, entitled Rihanna: Live in Concert in 2006.

== Background and title ==
Rihanna released her debut album Music of the Sun in August 2005. An R&B album, Music of the Sun incorporated musical elements of dance-pop and Caribbean music genres such as dancehall and reggae. The album received mixed reviews from music critics, who complimented its dancehall and Caribbean-inspired songs, while others criticized some of the production. Music of the Sun debuted at number 10 on the US Billboard 200 and peaked in the top-forty of album charts in Germany, New Zealand, Switzerland, and the United Kingdom. It produced two singles: "Pon de Replay" and "If It's Lovin' that You Want", the former of which peaked at number two on the US Billboard Hot 100 chart and number one on the US Hot Dance Club Songs chart.

When discussing the conception for her second studio album with L.A. Reid—Chairman and CEO of The Island Def Jam Music Group—Rihanna talked about experimenting with different music by incorporating some rock on the album. In February 2006, Rihanna announced that she was going to release her second studio album in April 2006 under the name A Girl Like Me. When asked about the album in an interview with MTV News, Rihanna stated: "Vocally I've matured so much, and lyrically I'm speaking about stuff I would never sing about [before]. Now I'm singing about experiences that I've gone through and stuff that other 18-year-old girls go through, so it's all about progression." In regards to the title of the album, Rihanna explained: "It's called A Girl Like Me because it's a very personal album, it's my baby. It's all about what it's like to be a girl like me, speaking of personal experiences as well as things that girls like me have gone through."

== Recording ==
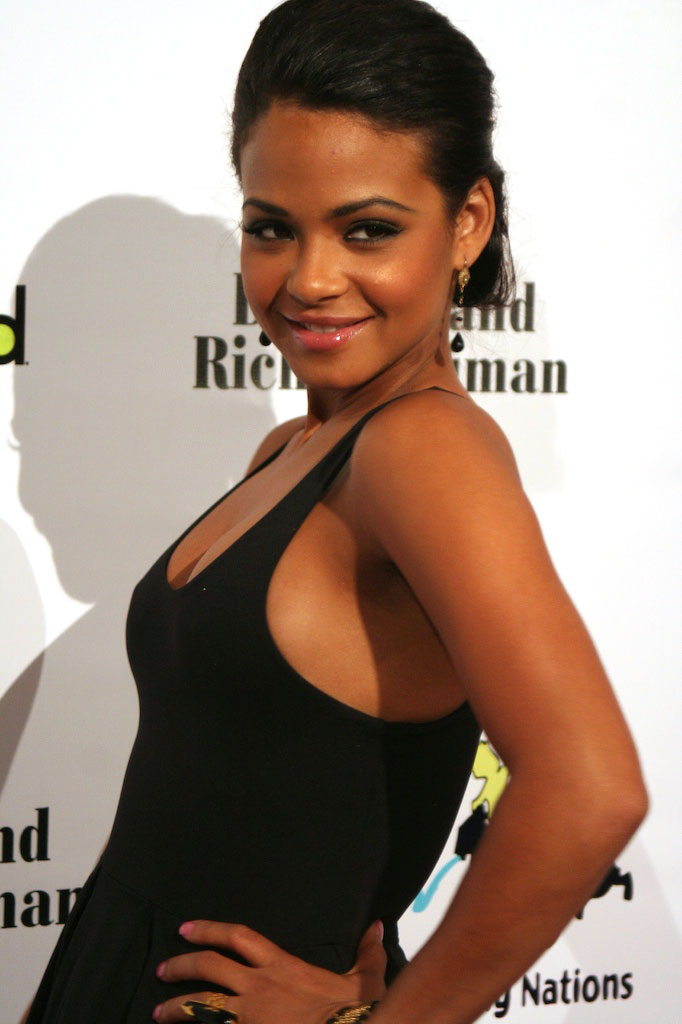
"SOS" was originally intended for Christina Milian's third studio album So Amazin', but she ultimately turned it down.

For writing and production of A Girl Like Me Rihanna teamed up once again with record producers Carl Sturken and Evan Rogers, who produced most of the tracks on her previous album, J. R. Rotem and Norwegian production duo Stargate. While recording the track "If It's Lovin' That You Want" for her debut album, Rihanna received a visit from American singer Ne-Yo, in which they met for the first time, although they never got the chance to collaborate on Music of the Sun. When production started, she came up with the idea of working with Ne-Yo. When asked about collaborating with Ne-Yo, Rihanna stated: "We never got around to it on the first album. So for the second album, I was like, 'You know what? I have to work with that guy Ne-Yo.' And it made it a lot easier because he's on the same label I am." For the album, Rihanna also worked with Jamaican reggae and dancehall artist Sean Paul on the track "Break It Off", which was recorded in Paul's hometown of Kingston, Jamaica.

While working on A Girl Like Me, Rihanna not only recorded songs but also promoted Music of the Sun. She commented: "We were so busy promoting the first album while trying to get this one done, working some crazy hours. That's why this album is so close to me, 'cause I really put my heart and soul into it." "SOS" was the first recorded track for the album, a song which was originally intended for Christina Milian's third studio album So Amazin'; however, she rejected it. L.A. Reid had Rihanna in mind as the next artist to record the song. The song was recorded within three days and eventually later released as the lead single from A Girl Like Me. "Kisses Don't Lie" was penned and produced by Evan Rogers and Carl Sturken and it was one of the three songs on the album on which Rihanna received writing credit. The song was written and recorded in her native Barbados, and was described by Rihanna as mixed with rock and reggae.

In the song "Unfaithful", penned by Ne-Yo, Rihanna wanted to speak about personal things that girls her age at the time were experiencing, which was inspired by the album's title and according to her it is one of her favorite songs on the album. "We Ride" was written and produced by StarGate, who also produced and co-wrote "Unfaithful". For the song "Break It Off", which features Jamaican artist Sean Paul, Rihanna flew down to Jamaica to record the song. The song was written by Donovan Bennet and it was co-written by Sean Paul and Rihanna herself. The album's closing tracks were written by Rogers, Sturken and Rihanna, who co-wrote the album's title track "A Girl Like Me". Rogers and Sturken produced and wrote eight of the album's 16 tracks.

== Composition ==
Musically, A Girl Like Me reveals new types of musical genres compared to Rihanna's light and uptempo debut effort, Music of the Sun. Her goal on the album was to find songs that express the many things young women want to say, but might not know how. In an interview, Rihanna said: "Now I'm singing about experiences that I've gone through and stuff that other 18-year-old girls go through, so it's all about progression." Reggae music, present in her debut album, subsequently continues into A Girl Like Me. For the album, Rihanna used influences of different music genres, including rock music, while keeping the reggae and dancehall roots of her previous album. The new effort also presents Rihanna's new side with some balladic elements. Although the album mostly follows the disco-ish mode of its predecessor, it was noted for its introduction of the rock genre to Rihanna's music, mostly represented by the rock and reggae mash-up "Kisses Don't Lie", though Rihanna herself stated that the album is not overall driven by rock influence. In an interview, Rihanna commented: "Growing up in Barbados, I wasn't exposed to a lot of rock music. We really love reggae and soca music and hip-hop. But when I moved to the United States last year, I was exposed to a lot of different types of music, rock being one of them, and I fell in love with it. [Now] I love rock music." Celia SanMiguel of Vibe magazine wrote that A Girl Like Me is "a pop album, one informed but not bounded by Rihanna's Caribbean roots", and that it "dispels any lingering notions of her as a dancehall-meets-R&B ambassador." Sal Cinquemani from Slant Magazine called the album "a record that almost identically" veered between "sunny dancehall/dub-pop", "hip-hop-infused club bangers", and "adult-oriented ballads".

Lyrically, the album's theme speaks of girls' experiences. The album was widely addressed a personal album, speaking about what it is like to be "a girl like me"—things that girls Rihanna's age at the time were going through—as well as every aspect of her life: people being cheated on, falling in and out of love, people hating on you, having feelings towards a guy and partying. "SOS" tells about a guy who gives the girl a feeling that is very overwhelming—he drives the girl crazy, and she needs someone to rescue her from it. "Kisses Don't Lie" talks about a girl who's in love with a guy but is stuck between an ultimatum because she's afraid of getting hurt. "Unfaithful" documents the decay of a relationship when another person starts cheating. According to Rihanna, "I'm referred to as a murderer in that song, meaning I'm taking this guy's life by hurting him, cheating on him. He knows, and it makes him feel so bad. It's killing him to know that another guy is making me happy." "We Ride" talks about how a guy promises a girl that they will be together forever, while the girl describes moments which he did things that could tear them apart. The lyrics of "Dem Haters" portray a message about how "haters" try to bring people down and recommends excluding them from your life. "Final Goodbye" talks about a woman who wants to spend the rest of her life with a man but feels that she needs to reveal a secret before moving on. "Crazy Little Thing Called Love" continues the theme of love in a similar vein to "SOS", however, "Crazy Little Thing Called Love" portrays a message about being in love, whereas "SOS" talks about having an overwhelming feeling towards a guy.

== Songs ==
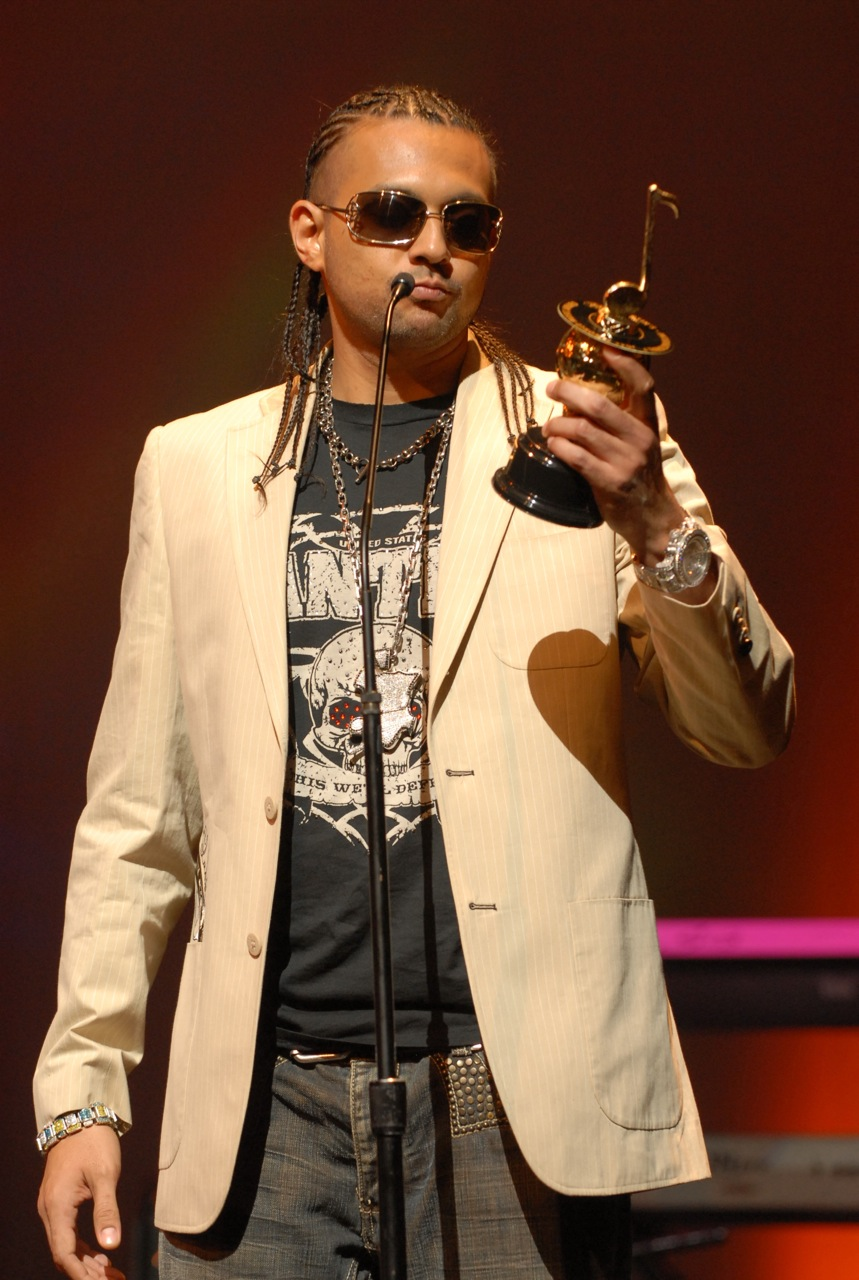
Sean Paul co-wrote and provided vocals on "Break It Off".

The album's opening track "SOS" is an uptempo dance song incorporating the key section, bass line, and drum beat of the 1981 recording of "Tainted Love" as performed by Soft Cell, although "SOS" contains a more dance-oriented beat to create a soulful anthem of young love. The song received positive reviews by critics, who called it "a sexy club tune." The song also features three different music videos, including two promotional music videos for Agent Provocateur and Nike, and the official music video, which was directed by Chris Applebaum. "Kisses Don't Lie", the album's second song, uses a mixture of Caribbean elements and electric guitar together with a mesmerizing bassline. On the ballad song "Unfaithful", the background instrumentation features a piano and strings. The song is the third track and the second single from the album, and was written by labelmate and fellow R&B musician Ne-Yo. Despite its strong chart performance, the song was panned by critics, who stated that "Rihanna's voice [on the song was] not particularly strong." The fourth track, "We Ride", features gently strummed acoustic guitar, with production handled by Stargate. The song received mixed reviews from critics and was less successful than the other singles. In the song's music video, directed by Anthony Mandler, Rihanna was featured hanging with her friends and scenes of her at the beach. After the song failed to chart in the United States, the song became the last single from the album to feature a music video.

"Dem Haters" features guest vocals by Barbadian singer Dwane Husbands. The song is the album's fifth track and was produced by Carl Sturken and Evan Rogers. The sixth track, "Final Goodbye", is a mid-tempo ballad containing ambient of strummed acoustic guitar. The seventh track, and the album's fourth and final single, "Break It Off", is a collaboration with Jamaican recording artist Sean Paul. The song contains dancehall influence. Although "Break It Off" did not feature a music video for its promotion, it still managed to reach the top ten in the singles charts in the United States, in ironic contrast to "We Ride", which did count with the support of an official music video. "Crazy Little Thing Called Love", the album's eighth track, is another collaboration song featuring Jamaican music group J-Status. The Carl Sturken and Evan Rogers-produced "Selfish Girl", is the ninth song of the album and contains reggae elements. The tenth track, "P.S. (I'm Still Not Over You)", is an R&B song also produced by Sturken and Rogers. "A Girl Like Me", the album's eleventh song and title track, is another R&B song also containing reggae elements. The album's third ballad, "A Million Miles Away", is the twelfth song on the album. It received mixed reviews from music critics, who commented that the song "kills whatever momentum the album has." The closing track on the standard version of the album is a remix serving as a sequel to "If It's Lovin' That You Want", which was Rihanna's second single from her debut album. The track, titled "If It's Lovin' That You Want - Part 2", features American rapper Corey Gunz.

== Singles ==
"SOS"
A 23 second audio sample of Rihanna singing the chorus of "SOS". The sample includes the synth riffs and machine beats instrumental, as well as the layered and compressed vocals.

"SOS" was released as the album's lead single on February 14, 2006, and as a physical maxi single on March 27, 2006. The maxi single included both the radio edit and instrumental versions of "SOS", as well as the album track "Break It Off", which features Jamaican reggae singer Sean Paul. "SOS" contains a sped up sample of "Tainted Love", which was originally written by Ed Cobb in 1965 and popularized by English synthpop duo Soft Cell, when they released their cover version in 1981. It received positive reviews from music critics, especially for its energy and Rihanna's vocal performance. It peaked at number one on the US Billboard Hot 100, and on the US Hot Dance Club Play and Pop Songs component charts, as well as number two on the UK Singles Chart. Two music videos, an official version and a Nike, Inc. promotional version, were directed by Chris Applebaum.

"Unfaithful" was released as the second single from A Girl Like Me on May 2, 2006. Written by American singer Ne-Yo and Mikkel S. Eriksen and Tor Erik Hermansen of Stargate, the song was originally titled "Murderer" and was inspired by the works of American rock band Evanescence. It garnered a mixed response from critics; many praised its powerful balladry, but some criticized the lyrics. The single peaked at number six on the US Billboard Hot 100 chart as well as at number two on the UK Singles Chart. The song's accompanying music video was directed by Anthony Mandler, and features Rihanna in a love triangle in which she struggles to choose between her husband and her romantic interest, and regrets having cheated on the former. Rihanna performed the song at the 2006 MOBO Awards and it has been included on the set lists of her concert tours, the Good Girl Gone Bad Tour (2007–09), the Last Girl on Earth (2010–11) and the Loud Tour (2011).

"We Ride" was released as the third single from the album; the song was sent to US mainstream and rhythmic radio stations on August 21, 2006. It was written by Makeba Riddick, Mikkel S. Eriksen and Tor Erik Hermansen, while production of the song was handled by Eriksen and Hermansen under their production team name, StarGate. "We Ride" was well received by critics, many of whom praised it as a good cruising song. It failed to chart on the US Billboard Hot 100, but managed to top the US Hot Dance Club Play chart and peaked at number 34 on the US Pop Songs chart. It failed to match the success of the album's previous singles, though peaking within the top twenty of the singles charts in Ireland, Slovakia and the United Kingdom. Its accompanying music video was also directed by Anthony Mandler, who had previously directed the music video for "Unfaithful". According to Rihanna, the video for "We Ride" is not as "out there" as the videos for "SOS" and "Unfaithful" were, as she wanted to do something less provocative to re-connect with people her own age.

"Break It Off" was released as the album's fourth and final single; it was released first in the United States on November 13, 2006 and internationally over four months later on February 27, 2007. The song was written by Donovan Bennett, Sean Paul, K. Ford and Rihanna, and it was recorded in Jamaica, where Rihanna joined Paul on vacation. The single garnered a positive reaction from critics, who hailed it as one of the album's highlights and a return to Rihanna's dancehall roots. "Break It Off" managed to attain chart success, in contrast to previous single "We Ride", and peaked at number nine on the US Billboard Hot 100 and number six on the US Pop Songs chart. Aside from the US charting, the only singles chart the song made an appearance on was in Belgium, where it attained a peak position of number 10. No music video for the song was shot, although Rihanna performed the song at the Radio One Big Weekend in 2007, after her third studio album Good Girl Gone Bad had been released, and performed "Break It Off" as part of the set list with other songs from all three of her albums up to that point. The song was also included on the setlist of the Good Girl Gone Bad Tour (2007–09).

=== Other charted songs ===
"A Girl Like Me" and "A Million Miles Away" made chart appearances on the Spanish Singles Chart in 2009, three years after the release of the album. The title track, co-written by Rogers, Sturken and Rihanna, peaked at number 25. The song prompted a mixed reaction from critics; Quentin B. Huff of PopMatters praised "A Girl Like Me", writing that the song is "refreshingly unpretentious" compared to "Unfaithful", which Huff labelled as "overboard with melodrama." However, Celia San Miguel of Vibe magazine criticized the song, and called it a "stumble" on the album and a "yawn-inducing slow jam." "A Million Miles Away" was also written by Rogers and Sturken, and peaked at number 38 on the Spanish Singles Chart. Huff wrote that the song, along with "Unfaithful", was not as good as the album's sixth track, "Final Goodbye".

== Promotion ==
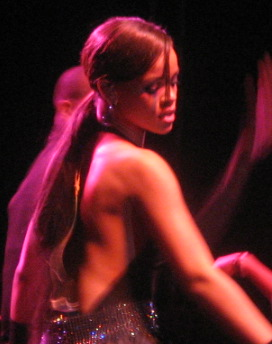
Rihanna performing at the KIIS-FM Jingle Ball, December 2006

During the recording process of A Girl Like Me, Rihanna served as the opening act for Gwen Stefani during the Harajuku Lovers Tour 2005 in Japan to promote Music of the Sun. While performing on the tour, she performed some of the songs that would appear on A Girl Like Me. Before the release of the album, Rihanna was given substantial promotional support from MTV, which highlighted "SOS" on Total Request Live when she premiered the single's music video on March 23, 2006. She then took part in advertising Nike and J.C. Penney by shooting a promotional music video for the album's lead single supported by Nike. The album was released through Def Jam Recordings in North America as a digital download on April 11, 2006, and as a physical CD on April 25, 2006. On the album's release date, Rihanna made a guest appearance on MTV's Total Request Live to promote the album.

The album was released only eight months after Music of the Sun had been released. Rihanna stated regarding the rapid album succession: "We just felt like it was time. It made no sense waiting...you should never put time on music. You should never say, "Okay, Music of the Sun has to be out at least a year and a half before we start with--" No. That's what's great about the music business. When you feel it's time, you just go for it. And we felt like it was time to come up with a new album." "SOS" was included on the soundtrack of the film Bring It On: All or Nothing, where Rihanna made a cameo in the film as herself; her debut single, "Pon de Replay", was also included in the soundtrack.

An expanded double-disc deluxe edition of the album was re-released in Germany, titled A Girl Like Me: Deluxe Edition, on November 17, 2006. Aside from the original track listing, the new edition features a bonus CD containing leftover tracks from A Girl Like Me and Music of the Sun. It also included an enhanced CD featuring two of Rihanna's music videos. In order to promote further the album, Rihanna embarked on the Rock Tha Block Tour and then toured with the Pussycat Dolls on the PCD World Tour, from November 2006 to February 2007 in the United Kingdom. She also recorded songs for advertising the Happy fragrance by Clinique and deodorant Secret of the company Procter & Gamble.

=== Live performances ===
Rihanna performed the album's lead single "SOS" on The Ellen DeGeneres Show on February 20, 2006, and at the 2006 MuchMusic Video Awards on June 18, 2006. Rihanna then performed her single "Unfaithful" on AOL Music, where Rihanna recorded her first Sessions@AOL broadcast, among other content exclusive to AOL members. On July 27, 2006, she performed "SOS" and "Unfaithful" on the MTV series Total Request Live. On September 20, 2006, Rihanna opened the 2006 MOBO Awards at the Royal Albert Hall in London with a performance of "Unfaithful". On November 2, 2006, Rihanna performed "SOS" live at the 2006 MTV Europe Music Awards held in Copenhagen, Denmark. On November 15, 2006, Rihanna performed "Unfaithful" at the 2006 World Music Awards, which also took place in London. On November 22, 2006, Rihanna performed "SOS" and "Unfaithful" on the Australian morning show Sunrise.

=== Tour ===
Rihanna further promoted A Girl Like Me through her debut concert tour, the Rihanna: Live in Concert. Taking place during the summer of 2006, the tour also supported her debut studio album Music of the Sun and traveled across North America.

== Critical reception ==
Professional ratings
Review scores
Source	Rating
AllMusic	3.5/5 stars
Blender	3/5 stars
Entertainment Weekly	B−
MSN Music (Consumer Guide)	(dud)
PopMatters	6/10
Rolling Stone	3/5 stars
Slant Magazine	2.5/5 stars
Spin	2/5 stars
USA Today	2.5/4 stars
Vibe	4/5 stars

A Girl Like Me received generally mixed-to-positive reviews from music critics. Dan Charnas of The Washington Post observed a "much broader musical palette than the wannabe-yoncés" and stated: "Sophomore slump avoided, Rihanna actually digs into some ambitious pop ballads". David Jeffries of AllMusic commented: "Versatile urban dance-pop singer Rihanna gracefully avoids the sophomore slump with A Girl like Me, a less tropical-flavored, more urban effort than her sun-and-fun debut." Jeffries compared the track "Kisses Don't Lie" to Damian Marley's "Welcome to Jamrock" and commented that "the album gets bolder and seamlessly bounces from genre to genre... Rihanna goes from a film noir song that elegantly uses murder as a metaphor for cheating ("Unfaithful") to an easy-flowing weekend cruiser ("We Ride")." Ruth Jamieson of The Observer noted: "Chuck in a bit of Sugababes-esque harmony, some M.I.A.-style electro and a dollop of reggae, and you're even closer to getting Rihanna. If you liked last year's ridiculously catchy "Pon de Replay", there's more of the same here."

In a negative review, Kelefa Sanneh of The New York Times wrote that apart from "SOS", "Unfaithful", and "Break It Off", "this scattershot album is full of duds". Barry Walters of Rolling Stone felt that the album "doesn't deliver anything else as ingenious as its lead single: Lightweight dancehall and R&B jams lack the single's ear-bending boldness. But the burning rock guitar of "Kisses Don't Lie" and haunted strings of "Unfaithful" help make A Girl Like Me much more likable." Sal Cinquemani of Slant Magazine felt that the album's ballads are "at least a decade too mature for the teenage singer's minor vocal talents." He added that, despite the clever sampling on "SOS", "comparatively gooey and spineless slow numbers like "Final Goodbye" and "A Million Miles Away" kill whatever momentum the album has." Robert Christgau of MSN Music graded the album a "dud", indicating "a bad record whose details rarely merit further thought."

== Commercial performance ==
A Girl Like Me debuted at number five on the US Billboard 200, selling 115,000 copies in its first week, nearly twice the debut sales of Rihanna's debut album Music of the Sun, which sold 69,000 copies in its first week. The album has since been certified 2× Platinum by the Recording Industry Association of America (RIAA) in the United States. As of June 2015, the album has sold 1.4 million copies in the US. The album debuted at number six in Ireland on the Irish Albums Chart. A Girl Like Me was later certified 2× Platinum by the Irish Recorded Music Association (IRMA). It also debuted at number six in the United Kingdom on the UK Albums Chart with sales of 24,000 copies on the issue dated April 24, 2006. The album reached its peak of number five in July 2006 due to the popularity of the single "Unfaithful" and it has so far sold almost 600,000 copies in the United Kingdom. In Europe, the album achieved a Platinum certification, granted by the International Federation of the Phonographic Industry. In Canada, the album topped the Canadian Albums Chart, becoming Rihanna's first number-one album in the country, and was later certified Platinum there.

In Australia, the album debuted at number 12 on the ARIA Albums Chart. The album later reached the number nine position and remained on the chart for twenty-one weeks. It was certified Platinum by the Australian Recording Industry Association (ARIA) for shipping 70,000 units. In Switzerland, A Girl Like Me peaked at number six and remained there position for two consecutive weeks and charted for 39 weeks. The album was certified Platinum there for selling over 30,000 copies. In Belgium, A Girl Like Me debuted at number 45 on the Belgian Albums Chart in April 2006. The album further climbed up the chart and reached the chart's top 10 by peaking at number 10. A Girl Like Me managed to reach the top 20 in Germany, Portugal, the Netherlands, France and Denmark. The album ended 2006 as the 20th-best-selling album in the world that year and sold an estimated 3,600,000 units worldwide.

== Track listing ==
A Girl Like Me track listing
No.	Title	Writer(s)	Producer(s)	Length
1.	"SOS"	Jonathan "J.R." Rotem; E. Kidd Bogart; Ed Cobb	Rotem; Evan Rogers^{[a]}; Carl Sturken^{[a]}	4:00
2.	"Kisses Don't Lie"	Rogers; Sturken; Robyn Fenty	Rogers; Sturken	3:52
3.	"Unfaithful"	Shaffer Smith; Tor Hermansen; Mikkel Eriksen	Stargate; Makeba Riddick^{[a]}	3:48
4.	"We Ride"	Riddick; Eriksen; Hermansen	Stargate; Rogers^{[a]}; Sturken^{[a]}	3:56
5.	"Dem Haters" (featuring Dwane Husbands)	Michael Flowers; Melanie Hallim; Aion Clarke; Vincent Morgan; Rogers; Sturken	Mike City; Rogers^{[a]}; Sturken^{[a]}	4:19
6.	"Final Goodbye"	Luke McMaster; Charlene Gilliam; Curtis Richardson	The Conglomerate; Rogers^{[b]}; Sturken^{[b]}	3:14
7.	"Break It Off" (with Sean Paul)	Donovan Bennett; Sean Henriques; Kirk Ford; Fenty	Don Corleon	3:34
8.	"Crazy Little Thing Called Love" (featuring J-Status)	Rogers; Sturken; Dale Virgo; Andrew Barwise; Byron Barwise; Oraine Stewart; Andrew Thompson	Rogers; Sturken; Gussie Clarke^{[b]}	3:23
9.	"Selfish Girl"	Rogers; Sturken	Rogers; Sturken	3:38
10.	"P.S. (I'm Still Not Over You)"	Rogers; Sturken	Rogers; Sturken	4:11
11.	"A Girl Like Me"	Rogers; Sturken; Fenty	Rogers; Sturken	4:18
12.	"A Million Miles Away"	Rogers; Sturken	Rogers; Sturken	4:11
13.	"If It's Lovin' That You Want – Part 2" (featuring Cory Gunz) (bonus track)	Jean Claude Oliver; Samuel Barnes; Riddick; Alaxsander Mosely; Scott LaRock; Lawrence Parker	Poke and Tone; Spanador^{[b]}; Rogers^{[a]}; Sturken^{[a]}; Riddick^{[a]}; Stargate^{[c]}	4:08
Total length:				50:18

Japanese bonus tracks
No.	Title	Writer(s)	Producer(s)	Length
14.	"Who Ya Gonna Run To"	Rogers; Sturken; Fenty	Rogers; Sturken	4:01
15.	"Pon de Replay" (Full Phatt Remix)	Nobles; Brooks; Rogers; Sturken	Nobles; Rogers; Sturken; Ward^{[c]}	3:21
16.	"Coulda Been the One"	Rogers; Sturken	Rogers; Sturken	3:38
Total length:				61:31

=== Notes ===
- ^{^[a]} denotes a vocal producer
- ^{^[b]} denotes a co-producer
- ^{^[c]} denotes a remixer
- Bonus track 13 was not included in the 2016 Vinyl Box Set and later re-releases.
- International editions feature the bonus remix track 15.
- Germany limited deluxe edition includes a bonus disc which features the Japanese bonus tracks of Music of the Sun and A Girl Like Me, the Nu Soul Remix of "Unfaithful" and the music videos of "Unfaithful" and "SOS".

=== Sample credits ===
- "SOS" contains excerpts from the composition "Tainted Love" (1981), written by Ed Cobb and performed by Soft Cell. "Tainted Love" was originally performed by Gloria Jones.
- "If It's Lovin' That You Want – Part 2" contains interpolations from the composition "The Bridge Is Over", written by Scott La Rock and Lawrence Parker.

== Personnel ==
Credits for A Girl Like Me adapted from liner notes.

Musicians

- Rihanna – lead vocals (all tracks), backing vocals (tracks 1–2, 4–6, 8–11)
- Evan Rogers – backing vocals (tracks 1–2, 5)
- Mikkel S. Ericksen – multi-instrumentalist (track 4)
- Sue Pray – viola (tracks 3, 6, 12)
- Donovan "Vendetta" Bennett – multi-instrumentalist (track 7)
- Ann Leathers – violin (tracks 3, 6, 12)
- Andy Bassford – guitar (track 9)
- Yuri Vodovoz – violin (tracks 3, 6, 12)
- John Beal – double bass (tracks 3, 6, 12)
- Jill Jaffe – viola (tracks 3, 6, 12)
- Luke McMaster;– guitar (track 6)
- Eugene Briskin – cello (tracks 3, 6, 12)
- Kevin Batchelor – trumpet (track 9)
- Yana Goichman – violin (tracks 3, 6, 12)
- Clark Gayton – trombone (track 9)
- Marti Sweet – violin (tracks 3, 6, 12)
- Richard Locker – cello (tracks 3, 6, 12)
- Tor Erik Hermansen – multi-instrumentalist (track 4)
- Maura Giannini – violin (tracks 3, 6, 12)
- Carl Sturken – guitar (track 12), piano (12), keyboards (6, 9), drum machine (9), multi-instruments (2, 8, 10–11)
- Ted Hemberger – percussion (track 12)
- Abe Appleman – violin (tracks 3, 6, 12)
- Cenovia Cummins – violin (tracks 3, 6, 12)
- Jeanne Ingram – violin (tracks 3, 6, 12)
- Jan Mullen – violin (tracks 3, 6, 12)
- Gene Moye – cello (tracks 3, 6, 12)
- Crystal Garner – viola (tracks 3, 6, 12)
- Richard Sortomme – violin (tracks 3, 6, 12)
- Katherine LiVolsi Stern – violin (tracks 3, 6, 12)

Production

- Carl Sturken – music producer (tracks 2, 6, 8–12), executive producer, vocal producer (1, 4–5)
- Evan Rogers – record producer (tracks 2, 6, 8–12), executive producer, vocal producer (1, 4–5)
- The Carter Administration – executive producer
- Augustus "Gussie" Clarke – record producer (track 8)
- Don Corleon – record producer (track 7)
- Poke & Tone – record producer (track 13)
- Mike City – music producer, audio mixer (track 5)
- James Auwarter – recording engineer (track 4)
- Donovan "Vendetta" Bennett – recording engineer, audio mixer (track 7)
- Dawn Boonyachlito – stylist, wardrobe
- Jay Brown – A&R
- Andrea Derby – production coordination
- Rob Heselden – production assistant
- Mikkel S. Eriksen and Tor Erik Hermansen – music producer (tracks 3–4, 13), recording engineer (3–4), remixing (13)
- Chris Gehringer mastering
- Franny "Franchise" Graham – recording engineer (track 5)
- Jeremy Harding – recording engineer (track 7)
- Al Hemberger – recording engineer (tracks 1–6, 8–12), audio mixer (2, 5–6, 8–12)
- Patrick Viala – mixer
- Doug Joswick – package production
- Ann Leathers – concert master (tracks 3, 6, 12)
- Debbie Mounsey – production assistant (tracks 3, 6, 12)
- Rob Mounsey – conductor, string arrangements (tracks 3, 6, 12)
- Adrienne Muhammad – A&R
- Malcolm Pollack – recording engineer (track 3)
- Makeba Riddick – vocal producer (track 3)
- J.R. Rotem – music producer, recording engineer (track 1)
- Tippi Shorter – hair stylist
- Rob Skipworth – audio mixing assistant (track 1)
- Tyran "Ty Ty" Smith – A&R
- Phil Tan – audio mixer (tracks 1, 3–4)
- Tiger Stylz – recording engineer (track 3)
- Nichell Delvaille – photography, art coordinator
- Tracey Waples – marketing
- Alli Truch – art direction
- Tony Duran – photography
- Valerie Wagner – design

== Accolades ==
Year	Ceremony	Award	Result	Ref.
2006	IFPI Hong Kong Top Sales Music Award	Ten Best Sales Releases, Foreign	Won	
2007	Barbados Music Awards	Album of the Year	Won	

== Charts ==
=== Weekly charts ===
Weekly chart performance for A Girl Like Me
Chart (2006)	Peak position
Australian Albums (ARIA)	9
Austrian Albums (Ö3 Austria)	21
Belgian Albums (Ultratop Flanders)	10
Belgian Albums (Ultratop Wallonia)	21
Canadian Albums (Billboard)	1
Czech Albums (ČNS IFPI)	7
Danish Albums (Hitlisten)	19
Dutch Albums (Album Top 100)	14
European Albums (Billboard)	8
Finnish Albums (Suomen virallinen lista)	30
French Albums (SNEP)	18
German Albums (Offizielle Top 100)	13
Hungarian Albums (MAHASZ)	3
Irish Albums (IRMA)	5
Italian Albums (FIMI)	36
Japanese Albums (Oricon)	4
Mexican Albums (Top 100 Mexico)	6
New Zealand Albums (RMNZ)	7
Norwegian Albums (VG-lista)	28
Portuguese Albums (AFP)	13
Scottish Albums (Official Charts)	8
South African Albums (RISA)	16
Spanish Albums (Promusicae)	81
Swedish Albums (Sverigetopplistan)	29
Swiss Albums (Schweizer Hitparade)	6
Taiwanese Albums (Five Music)	6
UK Albums (Official Charts)	5
UK R&B Albums (Official Charts)	1
US Billboard 200	5
US Top R&B/Hip-Hop Albums (Billboard)	2

=== Year-end charts ===
2006 year-end chart performance for A Girl Like Me
Chart (2006)	Position
Australian Albums (ARIA)	56
Belgian Albums (Ultratop Flanders)	59
Belgian Albums (Ultratop Wallonia)	77
Dutch Albums (Album Top 100)	97
European Albums (Billboard)	36
French Albums (SNEP)	58
German Albums (Offizielle Top 100)	51
Japanese Albums (Oricon)	77
Swiss Albums (Schweizer Hitparade)	34
UK Albums (Official Charts)	45
US Billboard 200	49
US Top R&B/Hip-Hop Albums (Billboard)	30
Worldwide Albums (IFPI)	20

== Certifications ==
Certifications and sales for A Girl Like Me
Region	Certification	Certified units/sales
Australia (ARIA)	3× Platinum	210,000^{‡}
Belgium (BRMA)	Gold	25,000^{*}
Canada (Music Canada)	2× Platinum	200,000^{^}
Germany (BVMI)	Platinum	200,000^{‡}
Hungary (MAHASZ)	Gold	5,000^{^}
Ireland (IRMA)	2× Platinum	30,000^{^}
Japan (RIAJ)	Gold	100,000^{^}
New Zealand (RMNZ)	2× Platinum	30,000^{‡}
Poland (ZPAV)	Gold	10,000^{*}
Russia (NFPF)	Platinum	20,000^{*}
Switzerland (IFPI Switzerland)	Platinum	30,000^{^}
United Kingdom (BPI)	2× Platinum	667,672
United States (RIAA)	2× Platinum	2,000,000^{‡} / 1,400,000
Summaries
Europe (IFPI)	Platinum	1,000,000^{*}
^{*} Sales figures based on certification alone.^{^} Shipments figures based on certification alone.^{‡} Sales+streaming figures based on certification alone.

== Release history ==
Release dates for A Girl Like Me
Region	Date	Format	Edition	Label	Ref.
Argentina	April 10, 2006	Digital download	Standard	Island Def Jam	
Australia	April 10, 2006	Digital download	Standard	Island Def Jam	
Austria	April 10, 2006	Digital download	Standard	Island Def Jam	
Brazil	April 10, 2006	Digital download	Standard	Island Def Jam	
Czech Republic	April 10, 2006	Digital download	Standard	Island Def Jam	
Denmark	April 10, 2006	Digital download	Standard	Island Def Jam	
Finland	April 10, 2006	Digital download	Standard	Island Def Jam	
Germany	April 10, 2006	Digital download	Standard	Island Def Jam	
Hungary	April 10, 2006	Digital download	Standard	Island Def Jam	
Italy	April 10, 2006	Digital download	Standard	Island Def Jam	
Japan	April 10, 2006	Digital download	Standard	Island Def Jam	
Netherlands	April 10, 2006	Digital download	Standard	Island Def Jam	
New Zealand	April 10, 2006	Digital download	Standard	Island Def Jam	
Norway	April 10, 2006	Digital download	Standard	Island Def Jam	
Portugal	April 10, 2006	Digital download	Standard	Island Def Jam	
Spain	April 10, 2006	Digital download	Standard	Island Def Jam	
Sweden	April 10, 2006	Digital download	Standard	Island Def Jam	
Switzerland	April 10, 2006	Digital download	Standard	Island Def Jam	
Canada	April 11, 2006	Digital download	Standard	Island Def Jam	
United States	April 11, 2006	Digital download	Standard	Island Def Jam	
Italy	April 19, 2006	CD	Standard	Universal	
United Kingdom	April 24, 2006	CD	Standard	Mercury	
Canada	April 25, 2006	CD	Standard	Universal	
United Kingdom	April 25, 2006	Digital download	Standard	Island Def Jam	
United States	April 25, 2006	CD	Standard	Island Def Jam	
Germany	April 28, 2006	CD	Standard	Universal	
Spain	July 17, 2006	CD	Standard	Universal	
Germany	November 17, 2006	CD	Limited deluxe	Universal	
France	March 26, 2009	CD	Standard	Universal	
Canada	December 8, 2011	CD	Limited	Universal	
