= Music of the Sun =

Studio album by Rihanna
- Released: August 29, 2005
- Recorded: 2004–2005
- Studios: Bassmint Studios; The Loft (Bronxville, New York); Avatar (New York, New York); Forceful Boondog (New York, New York); RMP (Orlando, Florida)
- Genres: Dance-pop; dancehall; R&B
- Length: 52:20
- Labels: SRP; Def Jam
- Producers: Dernst Emile; Full Force; Vada Nobles; Poke and Tone; Evan Rogers; Stargate; Carl Sturken

Rihanna chronology
Music of the Sun (2005)	A Girl Like Me (2006)

Singles from Music of the Sun
- 1. "Pon de Replay" Released: May 24, 2005; 2. "If It's Lovin' that You Want" Released: August 16, 2005

Music of the Sun is the debut studio album by Barbadian singer Rihanna. It was released on August 29, 2005, by SRP Records and Def Jam Recordings. Prior to signing with Def Jam, Rihanna was discovered by record producers Carl Sturken and Evan Rogers in Barbados, who helped Rihanna record demo tapes to send out to several record labels. Jay-Z, the former chief executive officer (CEO) and president of Def Jam, was given Rihanna's demo by Jay Brown, his A&R at Def Jam, and invited her to audition for the label after hearing the song that would become her first single, "Pon de Replay". She auditioned for Jay-Z and L.A. Reid, the former CEO and president of record label group The Island Def Jam Music Group, and was signed on the spot to prevent her from signing with another record label.

After Rihanna was signed by Jay-Z, she continued to work with Rogers and his production partner Carl Sturken, as well as other music producers such as Poke and Tone, D. "Supa Dups" Chin-quee, and Stargate. Music of the Sun features vocals from Canadian rapper Kardinal Offishall, music group J-Status, and Jamaican singer Vybz Kartel. Music of the Sun is a dance-pop, dancehall, and R&B album; it also incorporates elements of pop, hip hop, Latin-pop and other Caribbean music genres such as reggae and soca music.

Music of the Sun received generally mixed reviews from music critics, some of whom complimented its dancehall and Caribbean-inspired songs, while others criticized some of the production. Commercially, the album was a moderate success, debuting at number ten on the US Billboard 200 and number six on the US Top R&B/Hip-Hop Albums. In addition, it peaked within the top 40 of album charts in Germany, New Zealand, Switzerland and the United Kingdom. It produced two singles – "Pon de Replay" and "If It's Lovin' that You Want" – the former of which peaked at number two on the US Billboard Hot 100 and number one on the US Dance Club Songs. Music of the Sun was certified Platinum by the Recording Industry Association of America (RIAA). Rihanna promoted the album along with her next release with her debut concert tour, Rihanna: Live in Concert.

== Background ==
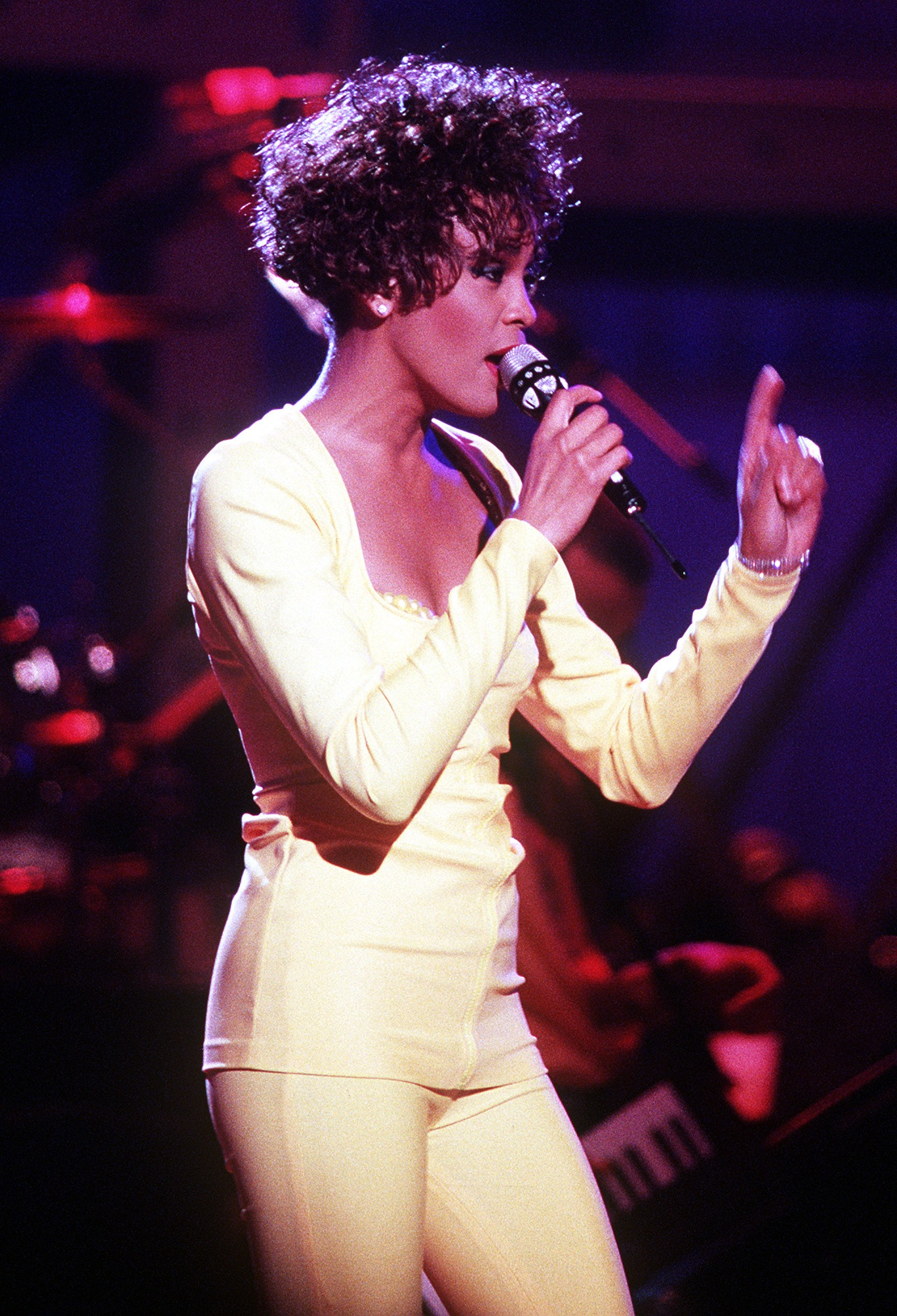
Prior to signing a record deal with Def Jam, Rihanna performed a cover of Whitney Houston's "For the Love of You" for then Def Jam chairman Jay-Z.

Before signing to Def Jam Recordings, Rihanna was discovered in her home country Barbados by American record producer Evan Rogers. The two met in December 2003 through mutual friends of Rihanna's and Rogers' wife, while the couple was on vacation in Barbados. After meeting for the first time, Rogers asked Rihanna to come to his hotel room, where she performed renditions of Destiny's Child's "Emotion" and Mariah Carey's "Hero". Rihanna's renditions impressed Rogers, who then took her to New York City, where she was accompanied by her mother to record some demo tapes which could be sent to record labels. She recorded the demo over the next year intermittently, due to Rihanna only being able to record during school holidays.

At the age of 16, Rihanna was signed to Rogers' and Carl Sturken's production company, Syndicated Rhythm Productions, who assigned her a lawyer and manager, before the completed demo tape was distributed to various record labels around the world in late 2004. The first to respond to the demo tape was Jay-Z, who had recently been appointed president and CEO of Def Jam Recordings. Rihanna auditioned for him and music mogul L.A. Reid in his office. Looking back on the audition and meeting Jay-Z, Rihanna explained in an interview how she felt before walking into the room, saying: "That's when I really got nervous..... I was like: 'Oh God, he's right there, I can't look, I can't look, I can't look!' I remember being extremely quiet. I was very shy. I was cold the entire time. I had butterflies. I'm sitting across from Jay-Z. Like, Jay-Zee. I was star-struck." During the audition, Rihanna performed Whitney Houston's cover of "For the Love of You", as well as "Pon de Replay" and "The Last Time", which were written and produced by Rogers and Sturken and would be included on her debut album, Music of the Sun.

Jay-Z was initially skeptical about signing Rihanna after he felt "Pon de Replay" was too big for her, saying "when a song is that big, it's hard [for a new artist] to come back from. I don't sign songs, I sign artists". The audition resulted in Rihanna signing a six-album record deal with Def Jam Recordings in February 2005, on the same day of the audition, with Jay-Z saying "There's only two ways out. Out the door after you sign this deal. Or through this window...", meaning that he was not going to let her leave without signing a record deal.

After signing to Def Jam Recordings, Rihanna cancelled other meetings with record labels and relocated from Barbados to New York City to live with Rogers and his wife. Rihanna explained the concept behind the title of the album to Kidzworld, saying that the sun is representative of her native Caribbean culture as well as herself and that the album consists of music from her heritage.

== Recording ==
Rihanna worked with various producers for Music of the Sun and continued to work with Carl Sturken and Evan Rogers, who had previously written and produced "Pon de Replay" and "The Last Time" for Rihanna's demo tape. Although Rihanna stated that when she first heard "Pon de Replay", she did not want to record it, expressing that she felt the song was "sing-songy", but grew to like the song at the end of the recording process. In an interview with Kidzworld, Rihanna learned how the pair helped her develop her song-writing abilities, talking about Rogers and Sturken, who had worked with recording artists including Britney Spears, Christina Aguilera and Kelly Clarkson.

== Music and lyrics ==
"Pon de Replay"
A 25 second sample of "Pon de Replay" featuring Rihanna singing part of the chorus and part of the pre-chorus, where she tells the DJ to keep playing the song she wants to listen to.

"If It's Lovin' that You Want"
A 20 second sample of "If It's Lovin' that You Want", showing Rihanna's vocal range.

Music of the Sun is a Caribbean-influenced, "urban" dance-pop, dancehall and R&B album. Its dance-pop songs are complemented by R&B ballads. The lead single "Pon de Replay" was written by Rogers, Sturken and Vada Nobles, and was produced by the first two. "Pon de Replay" is a simple dance-pop song with dancehall beats and reggae vocal cadence. Lyrically, the song has its protagonist asking the DJ to play her favorite song, as well as the fulfillment of dancing in a club. "The Last Time", written and produced by Rogers and Sturken, is an acoustic guitar driven ballad, while "Now I Know" is a stripped down string driven song. In addition to working with Rogers and Sturken for the majority of the album, Rihanna worked with production teams Poke and Tone of Trackmasters and Stargate. The former wrote and produced the second single released from the album, "If It's Lovin' that You Want", which Rihanna described as a "fun song". An R&B song, "If It's Lovin' that You Want" is a song about a girl telling a boy that he should make her his girl, because she has what the boy wants. A remix of the song, entitled "If It's Lovin' That You Want – Part 2", which features rap by Cory Gunz, was included as a bonus track on Rihanna's sophomore studio album, A Girl like Me (2006). Alongside Rogers and Sturken, Stargate co-wrote and co-produced "Let Me", which appears as the ninth song on the album. Music of the Sun also contains a remake of Jamaican singer Dawn Penn's "You Don't Love Me (No, No, No)", and features dancehall recording artist Vybz Kartel.

== Singles ==
"Pon de Replay" was released as the album's lead single on May 24, 2005. The song peaked at number one on the New Zealand Singles Chart and at number two on the US Billboard Hot 100 and the UK Singles Chart. An accompanying music video was directed by Little X and features Rihanna in a nightclub setting. Rihanna performed "Pon de Replay" complete with Barbados flags and colorful carnival attire at the MTV Video Music Awards pre-show in Miami, Florida on August 28, 2005. Rihanna also performed the song at the Macy's Thanksgiving Day Parade in November 2005.

"If It's Lovin' that You Want" was released as the second and final single from Music of the Sun on December 2, 2005. The song failed to replicate the chart success that "Pon de Replay" experienced, though managed to peak at number 36 on the US Billboard Hot 100 and inside the top 40 of multiple other record charts. An accompanying music video was directed by Marcus Raboy and features Rihanna in an island setting.

== Critical reception ==
Professional ratings
Review scores
Source	Rating
AllMusic	3.5/5 stars
Boston Herald	2.5/4 stars
Entertainment Weekly	C
The Jamaica Observer	3.5/5 stars
New York Post	2.5/5 stars
NOW Magazine	3/5 stars
PopMatters	5/10
Robert Christgau	(dud)
Rolling Stone	2.5/5 stars
Slant Magazine	2.5/5 stars

Music of the Sun received generally mixed reviews from music critics. Kelefa Sanneh of The New York Times viewed that the album's combination of dancehall and pop resulted in "["Pon de Replay" being] one [of] the summer's biggest and most seductive club tracks", but felt that Rihanna sounded "stranded" without a beat to sing along to. Barry Walters of Rolling Stone found it lacking in replay value, ingenuity, and rhythm, with "generic vocal hiccups and frills" of US R&B inflecting upon her "Caribbean charm". Sal Cinquemani of Slant Magazine called the album a "glut of teen R&B chanteuses" and described the lead single "Pon de Replay" as "a dancehall-pop mixture that owes plenty of its sweat and shimmy to Beyoncé's "Baby Boy". Evan Serpick of Entertainment Weekly wrote that Rihanna's "vibrant vocals lift tracks like 'That La, La, La' and 'Let Me,' but this bland dancehall/R&B debut is filled with chintzy production and maudlin arrangements that block out the Music of the Sun." Robert Christgau of The Village Voice rated the album a "dud", indicating "a bad record whose details rarely merit further thought."

In a positive review, Jason Birchmeier of AllMusic commented that the album presents Rihanna as "winsome rather than [a] wannabe," as well as how she set herself apart from other urban dance-pop artists such as Ashanti, Beyoncé, and Ciara. Birchmeier further explained that "Music of the Sun descends into faceless slow jams after a while, overall consistency not being among its attributes, but thankfully it picks up the pace toward the end..... the result is one of the more engaging urban dance-pop albums of the year." Chantal Jenoure of The Jamaica Observer complimented the dancehall and hip hop composition on several of the songs, including "Pon de Replay", "Rush", "Let Me", "Music of the Sun" and "That La, La, La", writing that they make the listener feel "happy" and "carefree".

== Commercial performance ==
In the United States, Music of the Sun sold 69,000 copies in its first week and debuted and peaked at number ten on the Billboard 200 in the chart issue dated September 17, 2005. The album spent a total of thirty-five weeks on the chart. Music of the Sun debuted on the US Top R&B/Hip-Hop Albums chart at number six in the same chart issue, and spent a total of forty-four weeks on the chart. After five months of release, the album was certified Gold by the Recording Industry Association of America (RIAA) on January 1, 2006, denoting shipments of over 500,000 copies. By the time Rihanna released her third studio album Good Girl Gone Bad (2007), the album had sold 539,000 copies, making it a slower-selling album than the others in her repertoire. As of June 2015, the album had sold 623,000 copies in the United States. On August 28, 2020, the Recording Industry Association of America (RIAA) certified the album Platinum. In Canada, Music of the Sun debuted and peaked at number seven on the Canadian Albums Chart in the chart issue dated September 17, 2005, but dropped out of the top ten the following week. After four months of release, the album was certified Platinum by Music Canada for shipments of over 100,000 copies.

Internationally, Music of the Sun failed to achieve a comparable level of chart success. In the United Kingdom, the album debuted and peaked at number 35 on the UK Albums Chart in the chart issue dated October 10, 2005. In its second week charting, Music of the Sun fell by three positions to number 38 and dropped out of the official UK Top 40 the following week. On May 12, 2006, the album was certified Gold by the British Phonographic Industry (BPI), denoting shipments of over 100,000 copies. Elsewhere in Europe, the album debuted on the Swiss Albums Chart at number 46 in the chart issue dated September 11, 2005, and peaked at number 38 four weeks later. In Austria, Music of the Sun debuted on the Austrian Albums Chart at number 61 in the chart issue dated September 18, 2005, and peaked at number 45 the following week. The album debuted and peaked at number 93 on the French Albums Chart in the chart issue dated September 24, 2005. In the Netherlands, Music of the Sun debuted and peaked at number 98 on the Mega Album Top 100 in the chart issue dated April 29, 2006, and spent one week on the chart. In New Zealand, the album debuted on the New Zealand Albums Chart at number 40 in the chart issue dated September 26, 2005. Between September 29 and October 10, 2005, Music of the Sun dropped out of the album chart's top 40, but made a re-entry at number 40 on October 10, 2005. In its fourth week charting, the album peaked at number 26.

== Track listing ==
Music of the Sun track listing
No.	Title	Writer(s)	Producer(s)	Length
1.	"Pon de Replay"	Alisha Brooks; Vada Nobles; Evan Rogers; Carl Sturken	Nobles; Rogers; Sturken	4:06
2.	"Here I Go Again" (featuring J-Status)	Rogers; Sturken; Robyn Fenty; J-Status	Rogers; Sturken	4:11
3.	"If It's Lovin' that You Want"	Jean Claude Oliver; Samuel Barnes; Makeba; Alexander Mosely; Scott LaRock; Lawrence Parker	Poke and Tone; Spanador^{[a]}; Rogers^{[b]}; Sturken^{[b]}; Makeba^{[b]}	3:28
4.	"You Don't Love Me (No, No, No)" (featuring Vybz Kartel)	Willie Cobbs; Ellas McDaniel	Rogers; Sturken; Dwayne "Supa Dups" Chin-Quee^{[a]}	4:20
5.	"That La, La, La"	Full Force; Dernst Emile	Full Force; Emile; Johnny "Too" Nice^{[a]}; Rogers^{[b]}; Sturken^{[b]}	3:45
6.	"The Last Time"	Rogers; Sturken	Rogers; Sturken	4:53
7.	"Willing to Wait"	Rogers; Sturken; Fenty; Coton Greene; Henry Redd; Nathan Watts; June Deniece Williams	Rogers; Sturken	4:38
8.	"Music of the Sun"	Rogers; Sturken; Fenty; Diane Warren	Rogers; Sturken	3:56
9.	"Let Me"	Makeba; Mikkel Storleer Eriksen; Tor Erik Hermansen; Rogers; Sturken	Stargate; Rogers^{[a]}; Sturken^{[a]}	3:56
10.	"Rush" (featuring Kardinal Offishall)	Rogers; Sturken	Rogers; Sturken	3:09
11.	"There's a Thug in My Life" (featuring intro by J-Status)	Rogers; Sturken; Etterlene Jordan	Rogers; Sturken; Rudy Maya^{[c]}	3:18
12.	"Now I Know"	Rogers; Sturken; Fenty	Rogers; Sturken	5:00
13.	"Pon de Replay Remix" (featuring Elephant Man) (bonus track)	Brooks; Nobles; Rogers; Sturken	Nobles; Rogers; Sturken	3:37
Total length:				52:17

Japanese bonus tracks
No.	Title	Writer(s)	Producer(s)	Length
14.	"Should I?" (featuring J-Status)	Rogers; Sturken; J-Status	Rogers; Sturken	3:06
15.	"Hypnotized"	Rogers; Sturken; Fenty	Rogers; Sturken	4:15
Total length:				59:41

=== Notes ===
- ^{^[a]} denotes a co-producer
- ^{^[b]} denotes a vocal producer
- ^{^[c]} denotes an additional producer
- United Kingdom edition includes the bonus track 14.
- Special Japan tour edition includes the music videos of Pon de Replay and If It's Lovin' that You Want and an Electronic Press Kit.

=== Sample credits ===
- "If It's Lovin' That You Want" contains interpolations from the composition "The Bridge Is Over", written by Scott La Rock and Lawrence Parker (KRS-One)
- "You Don't Love Me (No, No, No)" is a cover of a song with the same name by Dawn Penn.
- "Willing to Wait" contains interpolations from the composition "Free", written by Cotton Greene, Henry Redd, Nathan Watts and June Deniece Williams.
- "Music of the Sun" contains interpolations from "Rhythm of the Night", written by Diane Warren.
- "There's a Thug in My Life" contains interpolations from the composition "A Dream", written by Etterlene Jordan.

== Personnel ==
Credits for Music of the Sun are adapted from AllMusic and the album's liner notes.

Recording locations

- Bassmint Studios (Bronxville, New York)
- The Loft Recording Studios (Bronxville, New York)
- Avatar Studios (New York City, New York)
- Forceful Boondog Studios (New York City, New York)
- RMP Studios (Orlando, Florida)

Mixing locations

- The Loft Recording Studios (Bronxville, New York)
- Forceful Boondog Studios (New York City, New York)
- Sony Music Studios (New York City, New York)

Vocals

- Rihanna – main vocals, background vocals
- Full Force – background vocals (track 5)
- Sharina Sharpe – background vocals (track 5)
- Elephant Man – featured vocals (track 13)
- J-Status – featured vocals (tracks 2, 11)
- Kardinal Offishall – featured vocals (track 10)
- Vybz Kartel – featured vocals (track 4)

Musicians

- Larry Glazener – bass (track 12)
- Stephanie Cummins – cello (track 6)
- Richard Locker – cello (track 12)
- Mark Shumann – cello (track 12)
- Richard Sortomme – concertmaster (track 5)
- Carl Sturken – guitar (tracks 4, 6, 8), keyboards (tracks 1, 2, 4, 6–8, 10, 11, 13), piano (track 12), additional keyboards (track 9)
- Tor Erik Hermansen – instruments (track 9)
- Mikkel Storleer Eriksen – instruments (track 9)
- Rob Mounsey – string arrangement and string conductor (track 12)
- Ken Burdward-Hoy – viola (track 12)
- Vincent Lionti – viola (track 12)
- Sue Pray – viola (track 12)
- Debra Shuffelt-Dine – viola (track 6)
- Avril Brown – violin (track 12)
- Cenovia Cummins – violin (track 12)
- Yana Goichman – violin (track 12)
- Ann Leathers – violin (track 12)
- Jan Mullen – violin (track 12)
- Elizabeth Nielson – violin (track 6)
- Marti Sweet – violin (track 12)
- Uri Vodoz – violin (track 12)
- Carol Webb – violin (track 12)

Production

- Jay Brown – A&R
- Adrienne Muhammad – A&R
- Tyran "Ty Ty" Smith – A&R
- D. Emile – arrangements and producer (track 5)
- Full Force – arrangements, mixing, producer, recording engineer, and vocal production (track 5)
- Tai Linzie – art coordination, photography
- Andy West – art direction
- Jason Agel – assistant engineer (track 1)
- Val Brathwaite – assistant engineer (tracks 1, 13)
- Julius Díaz – assistant engineer (track 13)
- Blake Douglas – assistant engineer (track 1)
- Roy Matthews – assistant engineer (tracks 1, 13)
- Alex Pinto – assistant engineer (track 13)
- Ian Allen – business affairs
- Heath Kudler – business affairs
- Antoinette Trotman – business affairs
- The Carter Administration – executive producer
- Evan Rogers – co-executive producer, co-producer (track 9), producer (tracks 1, 2, 4, 6–8, 10–13), additional vocal production (tracks 3, 5)
- Carl Sturken – co-executive producer, co-producer (track 9), producer (tracks 1, 2, 4, 6–8, 10–13), programming (tracks 2, 4, 6–8, 10, 11), additional vocal production (tracks 3, 5), additional programming (track 9)
- D. "Supa Dups" Chinquee – co-producer (track 4)
- Johnny "Too" Nice – co-producer, mixing, and recording engineer (track 5)
- Spanador – co-producer (track 3)
- Rudy Maya – drum programming and additional production (track 11)
- Tippi Shorter – hairstyling
- Scott Felcher – legal counsel
- Evan Freifeld – legal counsel
- Marc Jordan – management
- Mylah Morales – make-up
- Tracey Waples – marketing
- Chris Gehringer – mastering
- Al Hemberger – mixing (tracks 2, 4, 6–12), recording engineer (all tracks), additional mixing (track 3)
- Jason Goldstein – mixing (track 3)
- Jason Groucott – mixing (tracks 1, 13)
- Vada Nobles – mixing and producer (tracks 1, 13)
- Michelle Graf – packaging
- Mark Mann – photography
- Ivan Otis – photography
- Poke and Tone – producers (track 3)
- Stargate – producers (track 9)
- Andrea Derby – production manager
- Rob Heselden – production manager assistant
- Matt Noble – recording engineer (tracks 3, 10)
- Deborah Mannis-Gardner – sample clearance
- Malcolm Pollack – strings recording engineer (track 12)
- Ms. Cee Gee – studio assistant
- Charlene Curry – studio assistant
- Lou$tar – studio assistant
- Raphaela St. Vil – studio assistant
- Crystal Streets – stylist
- Makeba – vocal production

== Accolades ==
Year	Ceremony	Award	Result	Ref.
2006	Barbados Music Awards	Best Reggae/Dancehall Album	Won	
2006	Barbados Music Awards	Album of the Year	Won	

== Charts ==
Weekly chart performance for Music of the Sun
Charts (2005–06)	Peak position
Australian Hitseekers Albums (ARIA)	18
Australian Urban Albums (ARIA)	26
Austrian Albums (Ö3 Austria)	45
Canadian Albums (Billboard)	7
Dutch Albums (Album Top 100)	98
French Albums (SNEP)	93
German Albums (Offizielle Top 100)	31
Japanese Albums (Oricon)	14
New Zealand Albums (RMNZ)	26
Scottish Albums (Official Charts)	46
Swiss Albums (Schweizer Hitparade)	38
UK Albums (Official Charts)	35
UK R&B Albums (Official Charts)	6
US Billboard 200	10
US Top R&B/Hip-Hop Albums (Billboard)	6

== Certifications ==
Certifications and sales for Music of the Sun
Region	Certification	Certified units/sales
Canada (Music Canada)	Platinum	100,000^{^}
Germany (BVMI)	Gold	100,000^{‡}
Japan (RIAJ)	Gold	100,000^{^}
New Zealand (RMNZ)	Platinum	15,000^{‡}
United Kingdom (BPI)	Gold	148,660
United States (RIAA)	Platinum	1,000,000^{‡}
^{^} Shipments figures based on certification alone.^{‡} Sales+streaming figures based on certification alone.

== Release history ==
Release dates for Music of the Sun
Country	Date	Format	Label	Ref.
United Kingdom	August 29, 2005	CD	Mercury	
Canada	August 30, 2005	CD	Universal	
United States	August 30, 2005	CD	Def Jam	
Germany	September 5, 2005	CD	Universal	
Japan	September 23, 2005	CD	Universal	
Japan	January 18, 2006	CD+DVD	Universal	
Japan	August 1, 2012	SHM-CD	Universal	
Canada	April 7, 2017	LP	Universal	
United States	April 7, 2017	LP	Def Jam	
