= Good Girl Gone Bad: Reloaded =

Studio album (reissue) by Rihanna
- Released: June 2, 2008
- Recorded: 2006–2008
- Studios: Westlake Recording Studios (Los Angeles, CA); Conway Recording Studios (Los Angeles, CA); Battery Studios (New York, NY); Roc the Mic Studios (New York, NY); Chicago Recording Company (Chicago, IL); Presusre Stuudios (Chicago, IL); Phase One Audio Group (Toronto, Canada); Lethal Studios (Bridgetown, Barbados); Espionage Studios (Oslo, Norway); Parr Street Studios (Liverpool, England); The Loft Recording (Bronxville, NY); Sunwatch Studios (Saint James, Barbados); Rocky Mountain Recorders (Denver, CO); Glenwood Place Studios (Burbank, CA); Phantom Studios (Westlake Village, CA)
- Genres: Pop; dance-pop; R&B
- Length: 57:03
- Labels: SRP; Def Jam
- Producers: Mark Endert; Mike Elizondo; Kuk Harrell; Brian Kennedy; Hannon Lane; Maroon 5; Terius "Dream" Nash; Ne-Yo; Neo da Matrix; Makeba Riddick; Jonathan "J.R." Rotem; Stargate; Mark "Spike" Stent; C. "Tricky" Stewart; Shea Taylor; Timbaland; Justin Timberlake

Rihanna chronology
Good Girl Gone Bad (2007)	Good Girl Gone Bad: Reloaded (2008)	Good Girl Gone Bad: The Remixes (2009)

Singles from Good Girl Gone Bad: Reloaded
- 1. "Take a Bow" Released: April 15, 2008; 2. "If I Never See Your Face Again" Released: May 2, 2008; 3. "Disturbia" Released: June 17, 2008

Good Girl Gone Bad: Reloaded is the reissue of Barbadian singer Rihanna's third studio album Good Girl Gone Bad (2007). It was first released digitally in selected countries on June 2, 2008, by Def Jam Recordings and SRP Records. Launched to mark the first anniversary of the original album, Good Girl Gone Bad: Reloaded features three newly recorded songs and a DVD showing exclusive behind-the-scenes footage of Rihanna's worldwide tour, the Good Girl Gone Bad Tour (2007–2009). For the new material, she worked with past collaborators Ne-Yo, Stargate, and C. "Tricky" Stewart, as well as Brian Kennedy, Mark Endert, Mike Elizondo, Mark "Spike" Stent and Maroon 5.

Good Girl Gone Bad: Reloaded received generally positive reviews from music critics, who praised the sound and production of the newly added material. However, other critics felt that the album was not worthy of re-release with only three new songs. Among other awards and achievements, the reissue's songs earned two Grammy nominations at the 2009 ceremony; "Disturbia" was nominated for Best Dance Recording, while "If I Never See Your Face Again" (featuring Maroon 5) received a nomination for Best Pop Collaboration with Vocals.

Following its release, the reissue helped Good Girl Gone Bad re-enter several national charts. Good Girl Gone Bad: Reloaded sold 63,000 copies in its first week and helped the original album rise to number seven on the US Billboard 200 chart. The reissue charted in New Zealand and peaked at number four; it was certified platinum by the Recording Industry Association of New Zealand (RIANZ), denoting shipments of over 15,000 copies. Good Girl Gone Bad: Reloaded was promoted with four singles, including the US number-one hits "Take a Bow" and "Disturbia", and "If I Never See Your Face Again". To further promote the album, Rihanna performed songs from the reissue on several television programs and award ceremonies including FNMTV and the 2008 MTV Video Music Awards.

== Background and release ==
Rihanna began working on her third studio album Good Girl Gone Bad (2007) in late 2006 and by late February 2007, the album was almost complete. Most of its songs were recorded in Westlake Recording Studios in Los Angeles, California, parallel to the recording sessions for her second studio album, A Girl Like Me (2006). For the album's production, she worked with some of the producers who were involved on her previous albums, including Evan Rogers and Carl Sturken, Ne-Yo, J. R. Rotem, Sean Garrett, and Norwegian duo Stargate. Rihanna also collaborated with Timbaland and will.i.am for the first time. Following its release, Good Girl Gone Bad became a worldwide commercial success and reached number one on the UK Albums Chart and number two on the US Billboard 200. It also received generally positive reviews from critics. The album's lead single "Umbrella" (featuring Jay-Z) became a commercial success and reached number one on over fifteen national singles charts, including the Billboard Hot 100, which it topped for seven consecutive weeks, and the UK Singles Chart, which it topped for ten consecutive weeks.

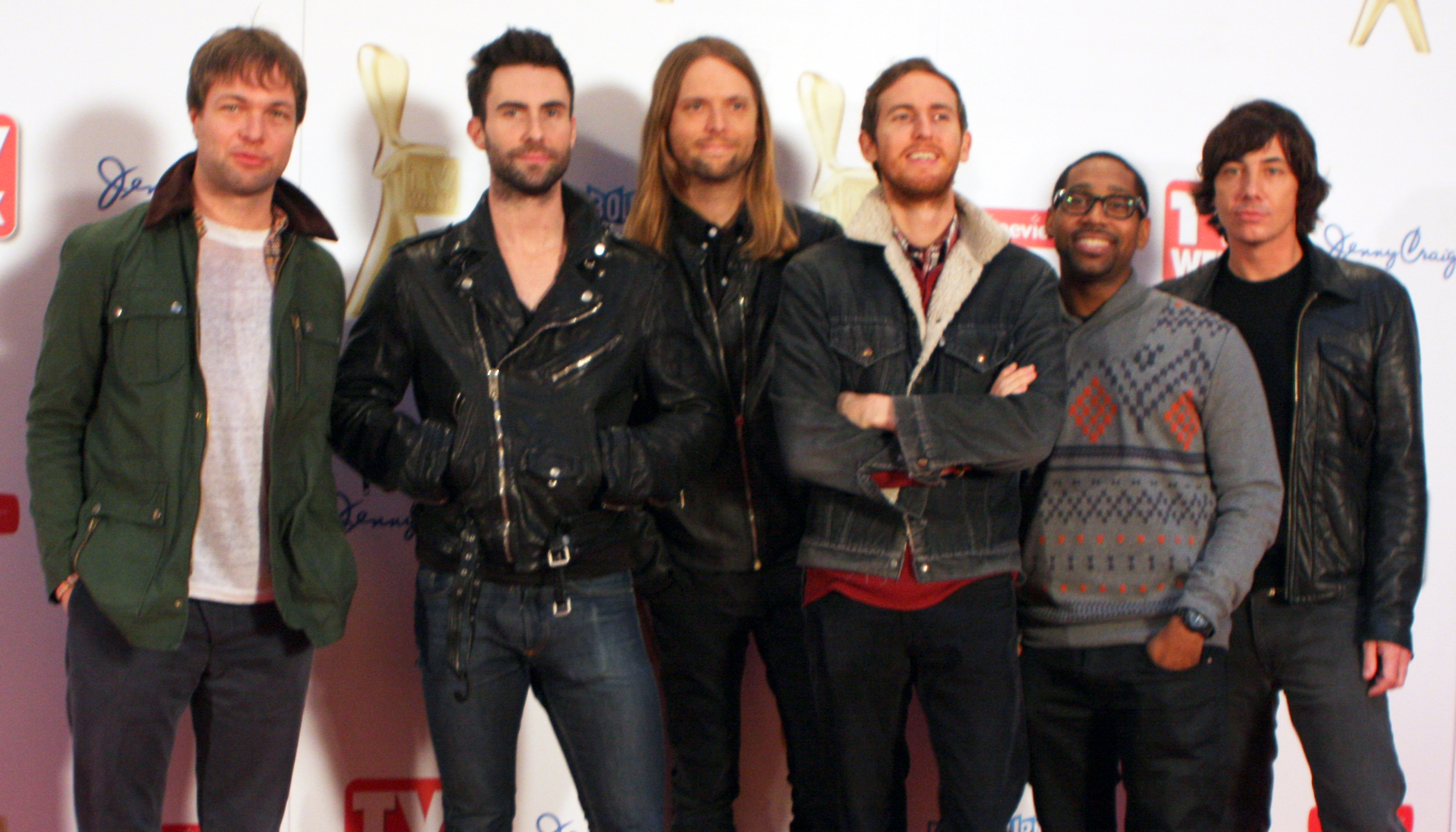
Good Girl Gone Bad: Reloaded features a collaboration with band Maroon 5.

In early 2008, Rihanna unveiled a new song titled "Take a Bow", which premiered on February 14, 2008, on the KIIS-FM radio show On Air with Ryan Seacrest. MTV News reported that the track would serve as the lead single from Good Girl Gone Bad: Reloaded, a reissue of the original album to mark its first anniversary. Rihanna further announced that apart from "Take a Bow", the expanded album would contain two more songs, one of which was a duet with American pop rock band Maroon 5, to supplement the original track listing. Good Girl Gone Bad: Reloaded was first released digitally on June 2, 2008, in certain countries, including Australia, Ireland, New Zealand, and the United Kingdom. The album was released physically on June 13 in Germany. On June 17, it was released in Canada, the United Kingdom, and the United States. A DVD containing behind-the-scenes footage of Rihanna's Good Girl Gone Bad Tour (2007–09) was included in a special version launched in the US for a limited time. Rihanna subsequently hosted a promotion party for Good Girl Gone Bad: Reloaded in New York City, which featured several celebrity guests, including LeToya Luckett, Teyana Taylor, and Wynter Gordon.

== New material ==
Four new songs were recorded for Good Girl Gone Bad: Reloaded: "Disturbia", "Hatin' on the Club", "If I Never See Your Face Again" (with Maroon 5) and "Take a Bow". All were initially confirmed for inclusion on the album, though "Hatin' on the Club" was removed for unspecified reasons. The song was leaked online in January 2009 on Big Mike & DJ Neptune's R&B Kings Part Two mixtape.

"Disturbia"
A sample of "Disturbia", an uptempo electropop song that is reminiscent of Rihanna's 2007 single "Don't Stop the Music" and has a "frosty-rave" chorus.

"If I Never See Your Face Again"
"If I Never See Your Face Again" is an R&B song that incorporates a "jagged" use of synthesizers and "buzzing" guitars in its production.

"Disturbia" is an uptempo electropop song. According to BBC Music's Fraser McAlpine, it is reminiscent of Rihanna's 2007 single "Don't Stop the Music". McAlpine also noted that the song has a "frosty-rave" chorus accompanied with Rihanna's "icy" vocals. It was written by Brian Kennedy Seals, Chris Brown, Robert Allen and Andre Merritt for the re-release of Brown's second studio album, Exclusive (2007). However, after finishing the song, Brown took preference to another track, "Forever", which would later be released as the first single from the re-release. He felt that "Disturbia" would be better suited for a female singer and gave it to Rihanna. Kennedy produced "Disturbia", while Makeba Riddick produced Rihanna's vocals. The song was recorded by Andrew Vastola at Rocky Mountain Recorders in Denver, Colorado. It was mixed by Phil Tan at Soapbox Studios in Atlanta, Georgia. Additional engineering was provided by Josh Houghkirk, with assistance from Carlos Oyanedel. Speaking to USA Today, Brown described his feelings about giving "Disturbia" to Rihanna: "It's fun being creative and even if you have a concept in your head to write about, you can write it and give it and give it to someone else because it might not personally fit you, but it might be an idea you have".

"If I Never See Your Face Again" is an R&B song that incorporates a "jagged" use of synthesizers and "buzzing" guitars in its production. It was written by Adam Levine and James Valentine, two of the five band members from Maroon 5. It was produced by Mark Endert, Mike Elizondo, Mark "Spike" Stent, C. "Tricky" Stewart and Maroon 5. "If I Never See Your Face Again" was recorded by Stent at Conway Studios in Hollywood, Glenwood Place Studios in Burbank and Phantom Studios in Westlake Village. The song was mixed by Endert at Scream Studios in Miami, with assistance from Doug Johnson. "If I Never See Your Face Again" was originally included on the standard version of Maroon 5's 2007 album It Won't Be Soon Before Long without the inclusion of Rihanna, however, Levine stated in an interview with James Montgomery for MTV News while on set of the music video that he wanted to try something different for the album's re-release. He also said that he asked Rihanna to do some "bits and pieces" in the recording studio and that it came together very quickly. Levine stated that if there is "magic" between two artists, then "you don't even have to think about it." In an interview with MTV's Total Request Live, Rihanna said that she was very excited about the collaboration with the band because she always "loved them" and their work.

"Take a Bow" is an R&B song that tells of how the female protagonist expresses disinterest in rekindling her relationship with a dishonorable and unfaithful ex-boyfriend. The song was written by Ne-Yo, Mikkel S. Eriksen and Tor Erik Hermansen. Hermansen and Eriksen produced and provided instruments for "Take a Bow" under their production name, Stargate, while Smith co-produced the song. Rihanna's vocals were recorded by Eriksen at Roc the Mic Studios in New York City, Westlake Studios in Los Angeles and Parr Street Studios in Liverpool. The song was mixed by Tan at Soapbox Studios in Atlanta, Georgia, with assistance from Houghkirk.

== Singles ==
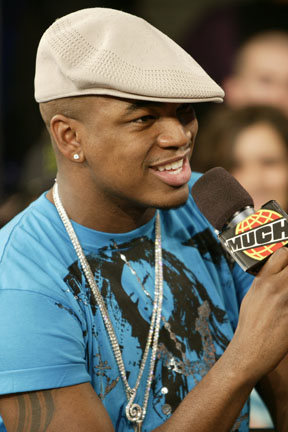
R&B singer Ne-Yo entirely wrote the lyrics to the lead single "Take a Bow".

"Take a Bow" was released as the lead single from Good Girl Gone Bad: Reloaded and fifth single overall from the two releases. The song was made available to purchase in media outlets, via Def Jam Recordings' website since March 14, 2008, and was later made available to download via iTunes Store on May 6, 2008. It peaked at number one on the US Billboard Hot 100 chart and became Rihanna's third song to reach the plateau. It has been certified four-times platinum by the Recording Industry Association of America (RIAA) and sold over three million digital copies. The single also reached number one in Canada, Denmark, Ireland, Slovakia and the United Kingdom. The accompanying music video was directed by Anthony Mandler.

The Spanglish version of "Hate That I Love You" featuring David Bisbal, was released as the second single from the album on April 28, 2008, in certain countries such as Argentina, Brazil and Spain. The song peaked at number 37 on the Spanish Singles Chart and stayed on the chart for a total of two weeks. "If I Never See Your Face Again", the collaboration with Maroon 5, was released as the second single from Good Girl Gone Bad: Reloaded. It was sent to contemporary hit radio in the US on May 15, 2008. It reached the top twenty on over five national charts worldwide. The music video for the song was directed by Anthony Mandler and shot on an indoor soundstage in Castaic, California. According to Dorian Lynskey of The Guardian, the concept for the video was "high-end erotica".

When the album was reissued, Rihanna approached L.A. Reid, the head of Def Jam Recordings and suggested that she wanted to release "Disturbia" as the next single. Speaking to MTV News, Reid said, "It was the first time Rihanna actually came to me and said, 'Here's the song I want to put out.' She played me the song. That was her taking control [...] She understands what hits are, and she knows what she wants to say. She's at that place where she can do that." It was solicited to US contemporary hit radio on June 17, 2008, and was released as a CD single in the United Kingdom on July 22, 2008. "Disturbia" earned Rihanna an award for Best International Song at the 2009 NRJ Music Awards. It peaked at number one in Belgium (Flanders) and New Zealand and became a top-ten hit in over twenty countries worldwide. The single topped the US Billboard Hot 100 chart for two consecutive weeks, and became Rihanna's third number one single from Good Girl Gone Bad and fourth overall on the Hot 100 chart. The music video for "Disturbia" was directed by Anthony Mandler and portrays Rihanna in various locations such as in a prison cell and gas chamber.

== Promotion ==
To further promote Good Girl Gone Bad: Reloaded, Rihanna performed on several television programs and award ceremonies. She performed "Take a Bow" for the first time at the 2008 MuchMusic Video Awards held in Toronto, Canada in the MuchMusic's headquarters on June 15, 2008. On June 20, Rihanna appeared on the Today Concert Series held at the Rockefeller Plaza, New York City. She performed "Take a Bow" together with her 2007 singles "Umbrella" and "Don't Stop the Music". On June 27, she appeared on FNMTV together with Maroon 5. She sang "Take a Bow" before performing together on their collaboration "If I Never See Your Face Again". In July 2008, Rihanna performed the Spanglish version of "Hate That I Love You" with Bisbal, at the sixth series of the Spanish talent show, Operación Triunfo.

Rihanna performed "Disturbia" for the first time at the 2008 MTV Video Music Awards, held on September 7, 2008. She performed it while revealing a leather "goth inspired" outfit. Together with the dance troops, she performed a Thriller-inspired dance in which glow sticks and leather props were used. On September 19, 2008, Rihanna visited France and performed "Disturbia" on Star Academy France. Rihanna sang "Disturbia" at the 2009 Super Bowl which was held at the Pepsi Center in Denver, Colorado. The performance of the song featured a sample from the White Stripes song "Seven Nation Army" (2003) and was accompanied by flames that shot up across the front of the stage.

== Critical reception ==
A reviewer from The National praised the material on the original album, particularly the "ubiquity" of "Umbrella", and also complimented "Don't Stop the Music", "Hate That I Love You", and "Shut Up and Drive". He further stated that the release of Good Girl Gone Bad: Reloaded was made to mark the first anniversary of the album and that "the new tracks are everything you want pop to be, and are a testament to the power of the original record and to the new Rihanna." Spence D. of IGN reviewed the new material and wrote that "Disturbia" is built on an infective "bum-bum-be-dum-bum-bum..." hook "that sucks you into the detached electronic bounce of the track". He said that "Take a Bow" is perfectly fitted for a "post-break-up days of gloom" and further praised Rihanna's vocals on the song. According to D., "If I Never See Your Face Again" is inspired by the works of American musician Prince and wrote that the "Rihanna's presence [on the song] definitely gives it a nice boost".

J. Edward Keyes of eMusic gave the album four out of five stars and wrote that the "uber-futurist" production of the release accompanied with Rihanna's "Robo Dominatrix vocal approach—is a big reason the record works so well. Good Girl Gone Bad: Reloaded is all blue-light electronics and primal throb, 25th-century pop music in the here and now." Digital Spy's Nick Levine also gave Good Girl Gone Bad: Reloaded four out of five stars, but was skeptical about the choice to re-release the album, writing that "it isn't worth forking out for Good Girl Gone Bad twice just to hear the new songs". Despite that, he praised the newly added songs especially "If I Never See Your Face Again"; he called the song "superior". Levine further wrote, "if Reloaded encourages a few hesitant pop fans to invest in this album, the closest thing to a Thriller that 2007/8 is likely to produce, this rather cynical reissue should be let off the hook... just." Among other achieved awards and nominations, "Disturbia" and "If I Never See Your Face Again" received nominations for Best Dance Recording and Pop Collaboration with Vocals respectively at the 2009 Grammy Awards.

== Commercial performance ==
After the release of Good Girl Gone Bad: Reloaded, music publications predicted that the reissue would sell between 45,000 and 50,000 copies in its first week in the US. For the week ending June 22, 2008, it sold 63,000 copies and helped the original version of the album to jump from number 124 to number seven on the US Billboard 200 in its 55th week. It also helped the original rise to number five on the Top R&B/Hip-Hop Albums. With this, Good Girl Gone Bad got back in the top 10 for the first time since its debut in June 2007. Five songs from the reissue were listed on the Hot Digital Songs, topped by "Disturbia", which debuted at number six. The next week, Good Girl Gone Bad (combined sales with Reloaded) fell to number nine and sold 40,000 more copies. In its third week, it charted at number ten on sales of 41,000 copies. By November 2012, both Good Girl Gone Bad and the reissue had sold 2,800,000 copies in the US alone. Good Girl Gone Bad: Reloaded helped the original album re-enter and peak at number six on the Canadian Albums Chart.

Good Girl Gone Bad: Reloaded debuted at number seven on the New Zealand Albums Chart in the week of June 30, 2008. It reached its peak position on the chart at number four the following week. It was certified platinum by the Recording Industry Association of New Zealand (RIANZ) for shipping over 15,000 copies. Following the reissue, the original album re-entered the charts of countries, including UK at number 12, Denmark at number 15, Switzerland at number 32, and Austria at number 36. By June 2012, Good Girl Gone Bad (combined sales with Reloaded) had sold 1,850,000 copies in the UK.

When Good Girl Gone Bad: Reloaded was released, the original album received a sales increase of 930%—more than any other non-debuting album in the history of the Billboard 200 chart. Its songs had sold over 17 million digital copies by July 2010. "Disturbia" and "Take a Bow" were two of the album's most downloaded songs. Before reaching number one on the Billboard Hot 100, "Take a Bow" jumped from number 53 to the top of the chart, following digital sales of 267,000 copies. It registered one of the biggest single-week jump to number one on the Billboard Hot 100.

== Track listing ==
Good Girl Gone Bad: Reloaded track listing
No.	Title	Writer(s)	Producer(s)	Length
1.	"Umbrella" (featuring Jay-Z)	C. "Tricky" Stewart; Terius "Dream" Nash; Thaddis Harrell; Shawn Carter	Stewart; Kuk Harrell^{[a]}	4:36
2.	"Push Up on Me"	Jonathan "J.R." Rotem; Makeba Riddick; Lionel Richie; Cynthia Weil	Rotem; Riddick^{[a]}	3:15
3.	"Don't Stop the Music"	Tor Erik Hermansen; Mikkel S. Eriksen; Tawanna Dabney; Michael Jackson	Stargate	4:27
4.	"Breakin' Dishes"	Stewart; Nash	Stewart; Harrell^{[a]}	3:20
5.	"Shut Up and Drive"	Evan Rogers; Carl Sturken; Stephen Morris; Peter Hook; Bernard Sumner; Gillian Gilbert	Rogers; Sturken	3:33
6.	"Hate That I Love You" (featuring Ne-Yo)	Shaffer Smith; Hermansen; Eriksen	Stargate; Ne-Yo^{[a]}	3:39
7.	"Say It"	Riddick; Quaadir Atkinson; Ewart Brown; Clifton Dillon; Sly Dunbar; Brian Thompson	Neo da Matrix; Riddick^{[a]}	4:10
8.	"Sell Me Candy"	Nash; Riddick; Timothy Mosley	Timbaland; Riddick^{[a]}; Nash^{[a]}	2:45
9.	"Lemme Get That"	Nash; Mosley; Carter	Timbaland; Nash^{[a]}	3:41
10.	"Rehab"	Justin Timberlake; Mosley; Hannon Lane	Timbaland; Lane^{[b]}; Timberlake^{[a]}	4:54
11.	"Question Existing"	Smith; Shea Taylor; Carter	Taylor; Ne-Yo^{[b]}; Riddick^{[a]}	4:06
12.	"Good Girl Gone Bad"	Smith; Hermansen; Eriksen; Lene Marlin	Stargate; Ne-Yo^{[a]}; Nash^{[a]}	3:33
13.	"Disturbia"	Brian Seals; Chris Brown; Andre Merritt; Robert Allen	Brian Kennedy; Riddick^{[a]}	3:58
14.	"Take a Bow"	Smith; Eriksen; Hermansen	Stargate; Ne-Yo^{[a]}	3:49
15.	"If I Never See Your Face Again" (Maroon 5 featuring Rihanna)	Adam Levine; James Valentine	Mark Endert; Mike Elizondo; Mark "Spike" Stent; Stewart; Maroon 5	3:18
Total length:				57:03

=== Notes ===
- ^{^[a]} denotes a vocal producer
- ^{^[b]} denotes a co-producer
- Deluxe edition includes the bonus DVD Good Girl Gone Bad Live.
- iTunes Store bonus videos edition features the music videos of "Take a Bow" and "Don't Stop the Music" and the videos version edition features all seven music videos and the live performance from Manchester Arena of "Rehab".
- UK & Australian Digital and Irish iTunes Store deluxe edition includes a bonus disc featuring 11 dance remixes by remixers including Seamus Haji, Soul Seekerz, The Wideboys, Moto Blanco, Steve Mac, K-Klass, and Digital Dog.
- Spotify bonus track edition features the Seamus Haji & Paul Emanuel Radio and Groove Junkies MoHo Radio remix of "Take a Bow" and the Jody den Broeder Remix of "Disturbia".
- UK, Irish, Australian and Japanese edition include the bonus track "Cry" and the Japanese edition includes the bonus track "Haunted".
- Latin America edition includes the Spanglish Version of "Hate That I Love You" featuring David Bisbal.
- Chinese and Asia edition includes the Mandarin or the Cantonese Version of "Hate That I Love You" featured by Hins Cheung.

=== Sample credits ===
- "Push Up on Me" contains sampled elements from the composition "Running with the Night", as written by Lionel Richie and Cynthia Weil, and performed by Richie.
- "Don't Stop the Music" contains elements of "Wanna Be Startin' Somethin'", as written and performed by Michael Jackson.
- "Shut Up and Drive" contains elements of "Blue Monday", as written and performed by New Order (Stephen Morris, Peter Hook, Bernard Sumner and Gillian Gilbert).
- "Say It" contains sampled elements from the composition "Flex", as written by Ewart Brown, Clifton Dillon, Sly Dunbar and Brian Thompson, and performed by Mad Cobra.

== Personnel ==
Credits adapted from album's liner notes.

- Jon Marius Aareskjold — guitar engineer (track 12)
- Armudn Bjørklund — guitar engineer (track 12)
- Stevie Blacke — violin and cello (track 10)
- Chris Brown — backing vocals (track 13)
- Edd Calle — orchestration, horn contractor, and conductor (track 9)
- Demacio Castellon — engineer (tracks 8–10), mixing (tracks 8, 9)
- Kevin "KD" Davis — mixing (tracks 7, 11)
- William Durst — engineer (track 9)
- Mike Elizondo — producer (track 15)
- Mark Endert — producer and engineer (track 15)
- Mikkel S. Eriksen — producer, engineer, and instrumentation (tracks 3, 6, 12, 14); vocal production (track 3); vocal engineer (track 14)
- Rodrigo Gallardo — trumpet (track 9)
- Chris Gehringer — mastering
- Rico Gonzales — engineer (track 8)
- Augie Haas — trumpet (track 9)
- Ricardo "Slick" Hinkson — assistant engineer (tracks 6, 12)
- Kuk Harrell — engineer and vocal producer (tracks 1, 4), instrumentation (track 1)
- Al Hemberger — engineer and mixing (track 5)
- Tor Erik Hermansen — producer (tracks 3, 6, 12, 14), instrumentation (tracks 6, 12, 14), vocal production (track 3)
- Josh Houghkirk — mixing assistant (tracks 2–4, 6, 12–14)
- Jay-Z — rap (track 1)
- Doug Johnson — assistant engineer (track 15)
- Brian Kennedy — producer (track 13)
- Anthony Kilhoffer — engineer (track 9)
- John Kricker — trombone (track 9)
- Hannon Lane — co-producer and keyboards (track 10)
- Daniel Laporte — additional engineering (track 11)
- Mat LeJeune — engineer (track 8)
- Espen Lind — guitar (track 6)
- Maroon 5 — performers and producers (track 15)
- Manny Marroquin — mixing (track 1)
- Roy Matthews — assistant engineer (track 5)
- Andre Merritt — backing vocals (track 13)
- Doug Michels — trumpet (track 9)
- Terius "The-Dream" Nash — vocal production and backing vocals (tracks 8, 9), additional vocal production and additional vocal engineering (track 12)
- Ne-Yo — vocals (track 6), vocal production (tracks 6, 12), co-producer (tracks 11, 14)
- Neo Da Matrix — producer (track 7)
- Greg Ogan — engineer (track 2)
- Carlos Oyanedel — additional engineer assistant (track 13)
- Deepu Panjwani — assistant engineer (tracks 6, 12)
- Jeff Pelletier — assistant engineer (track 2)
- Phillip Ramos — assistant engineer (tracks 3, 6)
- Makeba Riddick — vocal producer (tracks 2, 7, 8, 11, 13)
- Rihanna — vocals (all tracks)
- Dusty Robbennolt — assistant engineer (track 8)
- Evan Rogers — producer and backing vocals (track 5), co-executive producer
- Jonathan "J.R." Rotem — producer, arrangements, and instrumentation (track 2)
- Dan Satterwhite — tuba (track 9)
- Georgie Seara — engineer (track 2)
- Chris Steinmetz — engineer (track 8)
- Christopher "Tricky" Stewart — producer (tracks 1, 4, 15), instrumentation (tracks 1, 4), keyboards and drum programming (track 1)
- Bernt Rune Stray — guitar (track 12)
- Mark "Spike" Stent — producer and engineer (track 15)
- Tim Sturges — assistant engineer (track 3)
- Carl Sturken — producer and instrumentation (track 5)
- Phil Tan — mixing (tracks 2–4, 6, 12–14)
- Grayson Taylor — assistant engineer (track 8)
- Shea Taylor — producer (track 11)
- Dana Teboe — trombone (track 9)
- Timbaland — producer (tracks 8–10)
- Justin Timberlake — vocal producer and backing vocals (track 10)
- Mike Tocci — engineer (tracks 4, 6, 7, 11, 12)
- Marcos Tovar — assistant engineer (track 9)
- Andrew Vastola — vocal engineer (track 13)
- Matt White — trumpet (track 9)
- Shane "Bermuda" Woodley — assistant engineer (tracks 8, 9, 11)

== Charts ==
=== Weekly charts ===
Chart (2008) (Note: Chart positions listed are those attributed to Good Girl Gone Bad: Reloaded as an independent release. Re-entry positions of the original Good Girl Gone Bad following the Reloaded release are not attributed, and therefore not listed here.)	Peak position
Croatian Albums (HDU)	5
New Zealand Albums (RMNZ)	4
Swedish Albums (Sverigetopplistan)	53
Taiwanese Albums (Five Music)	8

Chart (2021)	Peak position
Swedish Albums (Sverigetopplistan)	52

Chart (2023–2026)	Peak position
Dutch Albums (Album Top 100)	46
Norwegian Albums (VG-lista)	26
Polish Albums (ZPAV)	45
Swedish Albums (Sverigetopplistan)	43

=== Year-end charts ===
Chart (2008)	Position
New Zealand Albums (RMNZ)	22
Swedish Albums Chart (Sverigetopplistan)	85

Chart (2023)	Position
Icelandic Albums (Tónlistinn)	86

Chart (2024)	Position
Swedish Albums (Sverigetopplistan)	47

Chart (2025)	Position
Icelandic Albums (Tónlistinn)	75
Swedish Albums (Sverigetopplistan)	24

== Certifications ==
Region	Certification	Certified units/sales
New Zealand (RMNZ)	Platinum	15,000^{^}
Sweden (GLF)	Gold	20,000^{^}
^{^} Shipments figures based on certification alone.

== Release history ==
Country	Date	Format	Label
Australia	June 2, 2008	Digital download	Def Jam
Ireland	June 2, 2008	Digital download	Def Jam
New Zealand	June 2, 2008	Digital download	Def Jam
United Kingdom	June 2, 2008	Digital download	Def Jam
Germany	June 13, 2008	CD	Universal
Canada	June 17, 2008	CD	Universal
United Kingdom	June 17, 2008	CD	Mercury
United States	June 17, 2008	CD, CD/DVD, LP	Def Jam
