= Good Girl Gone Bad =

Studio album by Rihanna
- Released: May 31, 2007
- Recorded: 2006–2007
- Studios: Westlake Recording Studios (Los Angeles, CA); Conway Recording Studios (Los Angeles, CA); Battery Studios (New York, NY); Roc the Mic Studios (New York, NY); Chicago Recording Company (Chicago, IL); Pressure Studios (Chicago, IL); Phase One Audio Group (Toronto, Canada); Lethal Studios (Bridgetown, Barbados); Espionage Studios (Oslo, Norway); Parr Street Studios (Liverpool, England); The Loft Recording (Bronxville, NY); Sunwatch Studios (Saint James, Barbados)
- Genres: Pop; dance-pop; R&B
- Length: 46:02
- Labels: SRP; Def Jam
- Producers: Carl Sturken; Evan Rogers; Neo Da Matrix; J. R. Rotem; Stargate; Tricky Stewart; Shea Taylor; Timbaland

Rihanna chronology
A Girl Like Me (2006)	Good Girl Gone Bad (2007)	Good Girl Gone Bad: Reloaded (2008)

Singles from Good Girl Gone Bad
- 1. "Umbrella" Released: March 29, 2007; 2. "Shut Up and Drive" Released: June 12, 2007; 3. "Hate That I Love You" Released: August 21, 2007; 4. "Don't Stop the Music" Released: September 7, 2007; 5. "Rehab" Released: October 6, 2008

Good Girl Gone Bad is the third studio album by Barbadian singer Rihanna. It was released on May 31, 2007, by Def Jam Recordings and SRP Records. Rihanna worked with various producers on the album, including Tricky Stewart, The-Dream, Neo Da Matrix, Timbaland, Carl Sturken, Evan Rogers and Stargate. Inspired by Brandy's fourth studio album Afrodisiac (2004), Good Girl Gone Bad is a pop, dance-pop and R&B record with 1980s music influences. Described as a turning point in Rihanna's career, it represents a departure from the Caribbean sound of her previous releases, Music of the Sun (2005) and A Girl Like Me (2006). Apart from the sound, she also endorsed a new image for the release, going from an innocent young woman to an edgier, more mature look.

Critics gave generally positive reviews of the album, praising its composition and Rihanna's new musical direction, though some criticized the album's lyrics and inconsistency. The album received seven Grammy Award nominations and one win in the Best Rap/Sung Collaboration category for "Umbrella" at the 2008 ceremony. The album debuted at number two on the US Billboard 200 chart and sold 162,000 copies in its first week. Certified seven-times platinum by the Recording Industry Association of America (RIAA), it has earned 8.6 million album-equivalent units in the United States. The album reached number one in Canada, Switzerland, and the United Kingdom. As of June 2017, the album has sold over nine million copies worldwide.

Good Girl Gone Bad spawned five singles, including the international hits "Umbrella" and "Don't Stop the Music"; Rolling Stone placed the former at number 412 on the magazine's 500 Greatest Songs of All Time list. To promote the album, Rihanna embarked on her first worldwide concert tour and third overall, the Good Girl Gone Bad Tour. The album was reissued as Good Girl Gone Bad: Reloaded in June 2008 with three new songs, including the US Billboard Hot 100 number-one hits "Take a Bow" and "Disturbia". It was followed by Rihanna's first remix album, Good Girl Gone Bad: The Remixes, in January 2009, which featured remixes from Moto Blanco, Tony Moran, the Soul Seekerz and the Wideboys.

== Background and title ==
I basically took the attitude of the bad girl and I really got rebellious and just did everything the way I wanted to do it—I didn't want to listen to anybody. I didn't consult with anybody. I just want to have a little more fun with my music and be a little more experimental in terms of my image and my sound. I just reinvented myself.

— Rihanna talking to The StarPhoenix about the style she took for the album

Rihanna's second studio album, A Girl Like Me, was released in April 2006. It is a pop-oriented record with dancehall and R&B influences. It had a mixed critical reception: some critics praised Rihanna's new musical direction, while others criticized some of the album's songs. Around its time of release, many critics felt that Rihanna's style, sound, and musical material were too similar to those of American singer Beyoncé. The album sold over 587,308 copies in the United Kingdom and more than 1,330,000 copies in the United States.

In early 2007, Rihanna began work on her third studio album. In an interview with MTV News, she announced that "the new music is going in a different direction. Not on purpose, but I just want to hear something fresh and mostly uptempo. I think that's where I want to go on this one. You feel different every album, and [at] this stage I feel like I want to do a lot of uptempo [songs]." The same year, Rihanna dismissed her innocent image for an edgier look with a new hairstyle, which was inspired by actress Charlize Theron's bob cut in the 2005 science fiction thriller Æon Flux.

Rihanna explained that she wanted to keep the audience dancing and be soulful at the same time. She sought to make an album that people would listen to without skipping tracks. She cited Afrodisiac (2004), the fourth studio album by the American singer Brandy, as her main inspiration for the album. In May 2007, Rihanna revealed that she called the album Good Girl Gone Bad because it represents her bolder and more independent image: "I'm not the innocent Rihanna anymore. I'm taking a lot more risks and chances. I felt when I cut my hair, it shows people I'm not trying to look or be anybody else. The album is very edgy."

== Recording and production ==
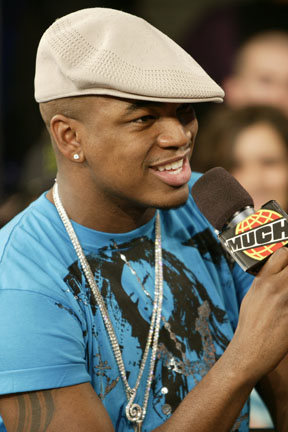
Ne-Yo co-wrote three tracks on the album, and provided vocals on "Hate That I Love You".

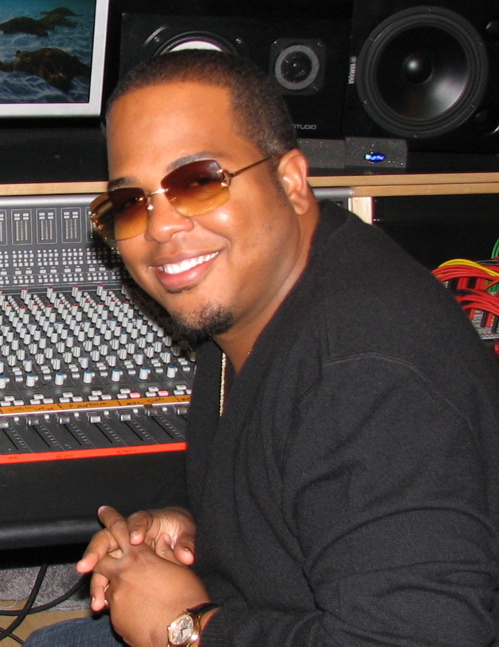
Producer Christopher "Tricky" Stewart co-wrote and co-produced the lead single from the album, "Umbrella".

Good Girl Gone Bad was recorded in Westlake Recording Studios and Conway Studios in Los Angeles, Battery Studios and Roc the Mic Studios in New York City, Chicago Recording Company and Pressure Studios in Chicago, Phase One Audio Group in Toronto, Lethal Studios in Bridgetown, Barbados, Espionage Studios in Oslo and Parr Street Studios in Liverpool. Rihanna spent the week of the 2007 Grammy Awards working with American R&B singer-songwriter Ne-Yo, who gave her vocal lessons. They wrote and sang "Hate That I Love You", which was co-written and produced by Norwegian duo Stargate. Ne-Yo told Vibe magazine, "The best way to express an emotion like love is through storytelling. It makes it more 'I can relate to this character in this song because I've been through something similar.' You hear that kind of storytelling in the song that I wrote for Rihanna called 'Hate That I Love You'."

American producers Tricky Stewart and The-Dream had written the track "Umbrella" in 2007 with pop singer Britney Spears in mind. Her label rejected the song before she could hear it, stating they had enough songs for her to record; at the time, Spears was working on her fifth studio album Blackout. The producers then reached out to Mary J. Blige, who did not have time to consider the song for her next album. Finally, L.A. Reid, then-CEO of Def Jam Recordings, bought the record and forwarded it to Rihanna. Initially, Stewart was unsure whether Rihanna was the right artist for the song, but after they had recorded the "ella, ella" catch phrase for the track, he felt optimistic. Rapper Jay-Z added rap vocals. Stewart also co-wrote and produced "Breakin' Dishes" with Nash.

"Rehab", "Sell Me Candy", and "Lemme Get That" were composed and produced by Timbaland for the album. He was on the FutureSex/LoveShow concert tour with Justin Timberlake to promote Timberlake's 2006 album FutureSex/LoveSounds. After a show in Chicago, they joined Rihanna in the studio, where Timberlake experimented with beats and melodies. Weeks later, the three met in New York City, where Timberlake had conceptualized a song for Rihanna. Timbaland, who penned a song for Rihanna under the title "Rehab", was producing a beat, over which Timberlake improvised his lyrics. Hannon Lane also co-wrote and co-produced the song. Timberlake told Entertainment Weekly that he believed "Rehab" to be "the bridge for [Rihanna] to be accepted as an adult in the music industry". Rihanna told Robert Copsey of Digital Spy that she enjoyed working with Timberlake, and learned much from the sessions.

== Composition ==
A dance-pop, pop and R&B album influenced by 1980s music, Good Girl Gone Bad is a departure from the Caribbean sound of Rihanna's previous two records. Lyrically, the album is close to some teen pop records, "where sexual-ism and consumerism supersede personal connection."

"Don't Stop the Music"
"Don't Stop the Music" is a dance-pop and techno song that samples the line "Mama-say, mama-sa, ma-ma-ko-ssa" which is taken from Michael Jackson's 1983 single "Wanna Be Startin' Somethin'".

"Rehab"
A sample of "Rehab", an old-styled R&B track with a groove that is built around tambourine shakes, acoustic guitar swirls and a subtle backbeat.

The LP opens with the lead single "Umbrella", an R&B song performed with drums and thundercloud synths. Dorian Lynskey of The Guardian compared the singer's vocals to the voices of Ciara and Cassie. The second track, "Push Up On Me", features echo electro claps and surging synths. "Don't Stop the Music" is a dance-pop and techno song that contains rhythmic devices used mainly in hip hop music. The song samples the line "Mama-say, mama-sa, ma-ma-ko-ssa" from Michael Jackson's 1983 single "Wanna Be Startin' Somethin'". The fourth song is "Breakin' Dishes"; Peter Robinson of The Observer called it a "wronged-woman bonanza, packed with hooks, chants and flashes of lyrical brilliance." "Shut Up and Drive" is a new wave and pop rock song, influenced by 1970s and 1980s musical styles, sampling New Order's 1983 single "Blue Monday". The collaboration with Ne-Yo, "Hate That I Love You", is a folky R&B song; Nick Levine of Digital Spy compared it to Ne-Yo's singles "Sexy Love" and "Because of You".

The seventh track on the album, "Say It", samples the 1990s song "Flex" by Mad Cobra; it consists of silky and warm groove and features island-oriented music characteristics. "Sell Me Candy" features jumbled and noisy production with chaotic beats. The ninth song, "Lemme Get That", has boom-bap beats and is produced by Timbaland. "Rehab" is an old-styled R&B track with a groove that is built around tambourine shakes, acoustic guitar swirls and a subtle backbeat. Doug Rule of Metro Weekly noted similarities among the structures of "Rehab" and Timberlake's 2002 single "Cry Me a River". "Question Existing" is an "eerie, smoky, destitute, emotional, and a sonic sidestep." Tom Breihan of Pitchfork Media described the opening lyrics of the song as inspired by "puerile psuedoporn". The album concludes with the title track "Good Girl Gone Bad", which is played with an acoustic guitar and click tracks.

== Singles ==
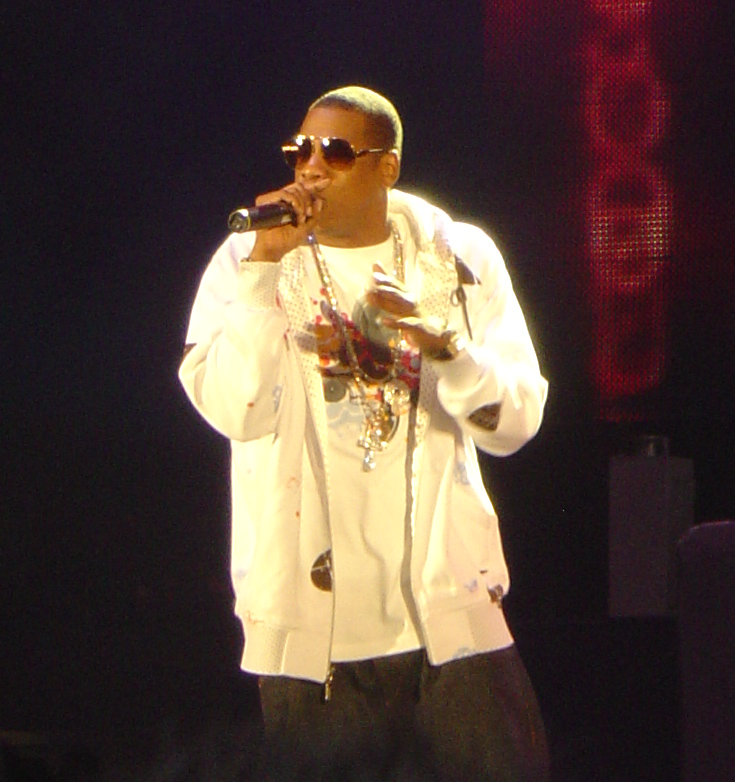
Critics praised the collaboration between Rihanna and Jay-Z on the lead single, "Umbrella".

Released as the lead single from Good Girl Gone Bad, "Umbrella" was sent to contemporary hit, rhythmic and urban radio in the US on April 24, 2007. The song received acclaim from music critics, who praised its production, vocals and the collaboration between Rihanna and Jay-Z. "Umbrella" reached number one in more than seventeen countries worldwide, including on the UK Singles Chart and the US Billboard Hot 100 chart. In the United Kingdom, the song topped the singles chart for ten consecutive weeks, while in the United States, it was at the top for seven consecutive weeks. As of June 2013, "Umbrella" has sold 4,236,000 digital copies there, making it Rihanna's fifth-best selling single in the country. Director Chris Applebaum shot the accompanying music video, which features scenes of Rihanna nude and covered in silver paint. The video earned the singer nominations at the 2007 MTV Video Music Awards for Best Direction, Video of the Year and Monster Single of the Year; it won the latter two.

The second single from the album, "Shut Up and Drive", was serviced to contemporary hit radio in the US on May 13 and rhythmic radio the following week. The song received mixed response from critics: some praised the composition, while others criticized the lyrics. It reached the top ten on more than twelve national charts, including number five on the UK Singles Chart and number 15 on the US Billboard Hot 100. The music video for the song was shot by Anthony Mandler in Prague, the Czech Republic.

The third single, "Hate That I Love You", which features Ne-Yo, was sent to contemporary hit, rhythmic and urban radio in the United States on August 21. Critics gave the song positive reviews and praised the collaboration between the singers; they compared it to the previous works written by Ne-Yo, including the song "Irreplaceable" by Beyoncé. "Hate That I Love You" reached number seven on the US Billboard Hot 100 and number 15 on the UK Singles Chart.

"Don't Stop the Music" was digitally released as an EP via the iTunes Store on September 7. The song received positive reviews from music critics, who praised its production and the interpolation of the "Mama-say, mama-sa, ma-ma-ko-ssa" hook. "Don't Stop the Music" won Best International Song at the 2008 NRJ Music Awards. The single peaked atop of the singles charts in eight countries, reaching number three on the Hot 100, and number four on the UK Singles Chart. It is the seventh-best selling single by Rihanna in the United States, with 3,521,000 digital copies sold as of June 2013. Mandler shot the music video in a nightclub in Prague, the Czech Republic.

"Rehab" was released as the fifth and final single from Good Girl Gone Bad; it was sent to contemporary hit radio in the United States on October 6, 2008. Critics were divided on the song's production and composition, and some compared its structure to that of Timberlake's 2007 single "What Goes Around... Comes Around". It reached number 16 on the UK Singles Chart and number 18 on the US Billboard Hot 100 chart. Anthony Mandler directed the accompanying music video, which was shot in Vasquez Rocks Park, near Los Angeles. Timberlake also appears in the video.

== Marketing ==
=== Release ===
Good Girl Gone Bad was first released by the Universal Music Group on CD in Portugal on May 31, 2007. It was released in the Netherlands and in Poland the following day. The album was launched in Finland and the United Kingdom on June 4 and in the United States the following day on CD and LP. Good Girl Gone Bad was released on CD in Germany on June 8, on LP in Australia on June 12 and on CD in New Zealand on the same date. A deluxe edition of the album, featuring a bonus disc with dance remixes, was launched on June 27 in Japan.

In early 2008, Rihanna unveiled a new song, "Take a Bow", on the KIIS-FM radio show On Air with Ryan Seacrest. MTV News reported that the track would serve as the lead single from Good Girl Gone Bad: Reloaded, a reissue of the original album to mark its first anniversary. Rihanna further announced that the expanded album would contain another two songs, "Disturbia" and the duet with American pop rock band Maroon 5, titled "If I Never See Your Face Again" to supplement the original track listing. Among other achieved awards and nominations, "Disturbia" and "If I Never See Your Face Again" received nominations for Best Dance Recording and Pop Collaboration with Vocals respectively at the 2009 Grammy Awards.

Good Girl Gone Bad: The Remixes was released on January 27, 2009, and contains club remixes of tracks from the original album and the re-issue. The songs were remixed by producers and disc jockeys such as Moto Blanco, Tony Moran, Soul Seekerz and Wideboys. Good Girl Gone Bad: The Remixes peaked at number 106 on the Billboard 200 and number four on the US Billboard Dance/Electronic Albums chart. As of July 2010, it sold 49,000 copies in the United States.

=== Live performances ===
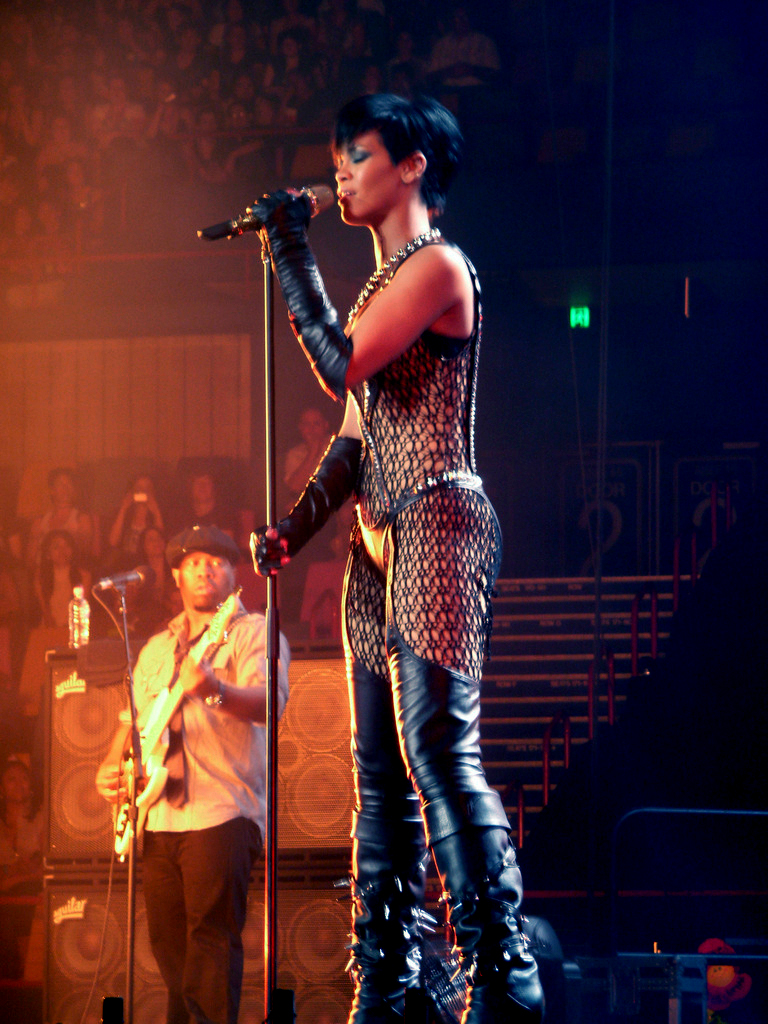
Rihanna performing during the Good Girl Gone Bad Tour in Brisbane, Australia

Rihanna performed "Umbrella" with "Shut Up and Drive" and "Breakin' Dishes" at BBC Radio 1's Big Weekend on May 21, 2007. She performed "Umbrella" with Jay Z at the 2007 MTV Movie Awards at the Gibson Amphitheatre, Universal City, California, on June 3. A reviewer of Rap-Up wrote, "she looked hot and the production was on point" during the performance. She performed the song at the Tonight Show with Jay Leno on June 5 and on June 16 at The View. Rihanna performed "Shut Up and Drive" at the 2007 MTV Video Music Awards at The Palms in Las Vegas, and was joined by American rock band Fall Out Boy. In early October 2007, Rihanna was the guest star at the Late Show with David Letterman, where she gave a performance of "Shut Up and Drive". On November 18, Rihanna performed a medley consisting of "Umbrella" and "Hate That I Love You" at the 2007 American Music Awards at the Nokia Theater in Los Angeles, California. Ne-Yo accompanied her for the performance of "Hate That I Love You".

Rihanna performed "Don't Stop the Music" at the 2008 NRJ Music Awards in Cannes, France, on January 26, 2008. She also performed the song at the 50th Annual Grammy Awards on February 10 in a medley with "Umbrella". For the performance, she was joined by American funk band, The Time. On April 28, 2008, Rihanna performed at the Pepsi Center with Kanye West, N.E.R.D. and Lupe Fiasco. She sang "Rehab", "Hate That I Love You", "Don't Stop the Music" and "Umbrella". On June 20, she was a guest on NBC's Today Concert Series in Rockefeller Center, New York City. She performed "Don't Stop the Music", "Umbrella" and "Take a Bow". She also performed "Rehab" live on November 23, 2008, at the 2008 American Music Awards, where she won the awards for Favorite Pop/Rock Female Artist and Favorite Soul/R&B Female Artist.

=== Tour ===
To further promote the album, Rihanna embarked on her first worldwide and second overall tour, the Good Girl Gone Bad Tour (2007–09). She performed in Europe, North America, Oceania, Asia and Africa. During the concert shows she wore S&M-inspired outfits and high boots. Mike Usinger of The Georgia Straight gave the show a mixed review; he wrote that even though Rihanna's vocals were improved, he felt she still struggled to keep the audience engaged. Jason MacNeil of Canadian Online Explorer gave a positive review of the concert after the show at Molson Amphitheatre, saying "the singer made a rather eye-popping impression, opening with 'Pon de Replay' and clad in a sexy, dominatrix-like studded black leather ensemble." During a show planned for February 13 in Malaysia, Malaysia's conservative Islamic party recommended that Rihanna's concert tour be banned from performing, citing her outfits. A video album, Good Girl Gone Bad Live, was filmed at the Manchester Arena show in Manchester, United Kingdom, on December 6, 2007. The Good Girl Gone Bad Live DVD was released on June 9 and 13, 2008, in the United Kingdom and Germany through Mercury Records and the Universal Music Group respectively.

== Critical reception ==
Professional ratings
Aggregate scores
Source	Rating
Metacritic	72/100
Review scores
Source	Rating
AllMusic	4.5/5 stars
Blender	3.5/5 stars
Entertainment Weekly	B+
Dotmusic	8/10
The Guardian	3/5 stars
NOW Magazine	3/5 stars
The Observer	4/5 stars
Pitchfork	7.4/10
Slant Magazine	3/5 stars
Uncut	4/5 stars

Good Girl Gone Bad received generally favorable reviews from music critics. At Metacritic, which assigns a normalized rating out of 100 to reviews from mainstream critics, the album received an average score of 72 based on 17 reviews. Uncut called it a "shiny, trans-atlantic blend of Europop vim, R&B grit and Caribbean bounce." Andy Kellman of AllMusic deemed it quintessential pop music and said each of its tracks was a potential hit. Quentin B. Huff of PopMatters praised the album, describing it as "more raw, perhaps edgier and more risqué" than Rihanna's previous material. Kelefa Sanneh of The New York Times wrote that the album "sounds as if it were scientifically engineered to deliver hits". Peter Robinson of The Observer commended her collaborators for "masking her own shortcomings" and commented that, "While Rihanna lacks her peers' charisma, she's a great vessel for exhilarating mainstream pop." Pitchfork Media's Tom Breihan found the album varied and satisfying. Neil Drumming of Entertainment Weekly felt that, although it "goes bad when Rihanna tries her hand at treacly ballads and glum sentiment", at times Good Girl Gone Bad is a "thrilling throwback to more than a decade ago, when upstart producers haphazardly mashed R&B with hip-hop to create chunky jeep anthems such as Mary J. Blige's 'Real Love'."

In a mixed review, Rodney Dugue of The Village Voice felt that the album "never settles on a sound" and only cited its three Timbaland-produced songs as highlights. Although he found the ballads to be improvements from Rihanna's previous albums, Slant Magazine's Sal Cinquemani criticized the lyrics, particularly those written by Justin Timberlake, as an "Achilles' high heel for Rihanna". Alex Macpherson of The Guardian found Rihanna to be "ill-suited" for its dance-pop songs and stated, "The gimmicky samples and pounding beats bury her personality, and the summery reggae of her first two albums is sorely missed." Robert Christgau of MSN Music cited "Umbrella" as a "choice cut", indicating "a good song on an album that isn't worth your time or money".

=== Accolades ===
At the 2008 Grammy Awards ceremony, Good Girl Gone Bad received seven Grammy Awards nominations, including Record of the Year and Song of the Year for "Umbrella", Best Dance Recording for "Don't Stop the Music", Best R&B Performance by a Duo or Group with Vocals and Best R&B Song for "Hate That I Love You". It won the accolade for Best Rap/Sung Collaboration for "Umbrella". Additionally, Rolling Stone placed "Umbrella" at number 412 on their 500 Greatest Songs of All Time list. The album also won the International Album of the Year award at the 2008 Juno Awards.

== Commercial performance ==
In the United States, Good Girl Gone Bad debuted at number two on the Billboard 200 chart, selling 162,000 copies in its first week. It became Rihanna's then-best start album entry. The next week, it fell to number seven with 81,000 copies sold. The re-issue sold 63,000 copies in the first week and helped Good Girl Gone Bad jump from number 124 to number seven on the US Billboard 200 in its 55th week. It was certified seven-times platinum by the Recording Industry Association of America (RIAA); by November 2013, both Good Girl Gone Bad and the reissue had sold 2,800,000 copies in the United States alone. As of 2025, it has earned 8,600,000 album-equivalent units in the country. The album debuted atop the Canadian Albums Chart and became Rihanna's second number-one album in the country. It was certified quintuple platinum by Music Canada, denoting shipments of more than 500,000 copies.

Good Girl Gone Bad debuted at number one on both UK Albums Chart and UK Hip Hop and R&B Albums Chart with sales of 54,000 copies in its first week. It became her first album to top the chart, and stayed on the chart for 177 weeks. It was certified eight times platinum by the British Phonographic Industry (BPI) and sold over 1,904,347 copies in the country, as of 2016. It ended at number 10 on the UK 2007 year-end list and number six on the 2008 year-end list. As of March 2015, Good Girl Gone Bad is the 46th best-selling album of the millennium in the United Kingdom. In Ireland, Good Girl Gone Bad debuted at number three on the Irish Singles Chart on June 7, 2007. After four weeks on the chart, it reached the top. The album peaked at number one on the Swiss Hitparade chart and stayed on the chart for 91 weeks. In Australia, it peaked at number two and was certified triple platinum by the Australian Recording Industry Association (ARIA), denoting shipments of over 210,000 copies. To date, the album had sold 9 million album units worldwide.

Before its physical release, "Umbrella" achieved the biggest debut in the six-year history of the iTunes Store in the United States, breaking a record previously held by Shakira's 2006 single "Hips Don't Lie". Following its digital release, the song debuted atop the Hot Digital Songs chart, with first-week sales of more than 277,000 units. The single became the highest digital debut in the United States since Nielsen SoundScan began tracking downloads in 2003, surpassing Timberlake's "SexyBack" 250,000 sales record in 2006.

== Legacy ==
According to Biography.com, Good Girl Gone Bad inspired Rihanna to transform her image from a "teen pop princess" persona into a "fully fledged superstar and sex symbol". People magazine noted that Rihanna follows the likes of recording artists Mariah Carey, Janet Jackson and Christina Aguilera "when she sheds her innocent image for an edgier look and sound". Jay-Z also spoke about "Umbrella" and stated that the song represents an artistic growth for Rihanna, "If you listen to the lyrics to that song, you know the depth and how far she's come." Da'Shan Smith of Billboard commented on Good Girl Gone Bad's impact for Rihanna's career on the tenth anniversary of the album's release: "The Good Girl era became a universally recognized moment where RiRi solidified her position as an international superstar, her signature bob haircut and newly seductive stage persona captivating fans and press."

Regarding the commercial impact of the album, Entertainment Weekly's Margeaux Watson wrote, "For a pop star who was once dismissed as being incapable of yielding more than one hit song per album, Rihanna's newfound staying power is nothing short of remarkable–and proof that there's room for more than one diva in this game." Jason Birchmeier of AllMusic concluded that it was Good Girl Gone Bad that made Rihanna a "full-fledged international pop star with a regular presence atop the charts". Nick Levine of Digital Spy described the album, as the closest thing to a Thriller that 2007/08 is likely to produce.

== Track listing ==
Good Girl Gone Bad track listing
No.	Title	Writer(s)	Producer(s)	Length
1.	"Umbrella" (featuring Jay-Z)	Christopher "Tricky" Stewart; Terius "Dream" Nash; Thaddis Harrell; Shawn Carter	Stewart; Kuk Harrell^{[a]}	4:35
2.	"Push Up on Me"	J.R. Rotem; Makeba Riddick; Lionel Richie; Cynthia Weil	Rotem; Riddick^{[a]}	3:15
3.	"Don't Stop the Music"	Tor Erik Hermansen; Mikkel S. Eriksen; Tawanna Dabney; Michael Jackson	Stargate	4:27
4.	"Breakin' Dishes"	Stewart; Nash	Stewart; Harrell^{[a]}	3:20
5.	"Shut Up and Drive"	Evan Rogers; Carl Sturken; Stephen Morris; Peter Hook; Bernard Sumner; Gillian Gilbert	Rogers; Sturken	3:33
6.	"Hate That I Love You" (featuring Ne-Yo)	Shaffer Smith; Hermansen; Eriksen	Stargate; Ne-Yo^{[a]}	3:39
7.	"Say It"	Riddick; Quaadir Atkinson; Ewart Brown; Clifton Dillon; Sly Dunbar; Brian Thompson	Neo da Matrix; Riddick^{[a]}	4:10
8.	"Sell Me Candy"	Nash; Riddick; Timothy Mosley	Timbaland; Riddick^{[a]}; Nash^{[a]}	2:45
9.	"Lemme Get That"	Nash; Mosley; Carter	Timbaland; Nash^{[a]}	3:41
10.	"Rehab"	Justin Timberlake; Mosley; Hannon Lane	Timbaland; Lane^{[b]}; Timberlake^{[a]}	4:54
11.	"Question Existing"	Smith; Shea Taylor; Carter	Taylor; Ne-Yo^{[b]}; Riddick^{[a]}	4:08
12.	"Good Girl Gone Bad"	Smith; Hermansen; Eriksen; Lene Marlin	Stargate; Ne-Yo^{[a]}; Nash^{[a]}	3:35
Total length:				46:02

Japanese bonus tracks
No.	Title	Writer(s)	Producer(s)	Length
13.	"Cry"	Hermansen; Eriksen; Dabney	Stargate	3:53
14.	"Haunted"	Rogers; Sturken	Rogers; Sturken	4:09
Total length:				54:04

=== Notes ===
- ^{^[a]} denotes a vocal producer
- ^{^[b]} denotes a co-producer
- ^{^[c]} denotes a remixer and additional producer
- For the Reloaded bonus tracks see Reloaded edition.
- Deluxe edition includes a bonus disc featuring 11 dance remixes by remixers including Seamus Haji, Soul Seekerz, The Wideboys, Moto Blanco, Steve Mac, K-Klass, and Digital Dog and the Japanese version includes the music video of "Umbrella".
- Australian and UK edition include the bonus track 13.
- French edition includes the Lindbergh Palace Remix of "Umbrella".
- UK digital edition includes the acoustic version of "Umbrella".

=== Sample credits ===
- "Push Up on Me" contains sampled elements from the composition "Running with the Night", as written by Lionel Richie and Cynthia Weil, and performed by Richie.
- "Don't Stop the Music" contains elements of "Wanna Be Startin' Somethin'", as written and performed by Michael Jackson.
- "Shut Up and Drive" contains elements of "Blue Monday", as written and performed by New Order (Stephen Morris, Peter Hook, Bernard Sumner and Gillian Gilbert).
- "Say It" contains sampled elements from the composition "Flex", as written by Ewart Brown, Clifton Dillon, Sly Dunbar and Brian Thompson, and performed by Mad Cobra.

== Personnel ==
Credits for Good Girl Gone Bad adapted from AllMusic.

- Jon Marius Aareskjold – engineer, guitar engineer
- Angela Allen – marketing coordinator
- Stevie Blacke – cello, violin
- Tim Blacksmith – management
- Jay Brown – A&R
- Ed Calle – conductor, horn conductor, orchestration
- Carter Administration – executive producer
- Shawn Carter – additional personnel, guest artist, primary artist, rap
- Demacio Castellon – engineer, mixing
- Danny D – management
- Kevin "KD" Davis – mixing
- Roberto Deste – photography
- William Durst – engineer
- Mikkel Storleer Eriksen – engineer, instrumentation, musician
- Terence Franklyn – assistant, assistant engineer
- Rodrigo Gallardo – trumpet
- Chris Gehringer – mastering
- Richard "Rico" Gonzales – engineer
- Augie Haas – trumpet
- Kuk Harrell – engineer, vocal producer
- Al Hemberger – engineer, mixing
- Rob Heselden – production coordination
- Ricardo "Slick" Hinkson – assistant engineer
- Josh Houghkirk – assistant, mixing Assistant
- Marc Jordan – management
- Terese Joseph – A&R
- Doug Joswick – package production
- Anthony Kilhoffer – engineer
- John Kricker – trombone
- Hannon Lane – keyboards, producer
- Daniel Laporte – engineer
- Mathieu Lejeune – engineer
- Mat LeJeuneat – engineer
- Fabienne Leys – artist coordination
- Espen Lind – guitar
- Adam Lowenberg – marketing, mastering
- Deborah Mannis-Gardner – sample clearance
- Manny Marroquin – mixing
- Roy Matthews – assistant, mixing assistant
- Doug Michels – trumpet
- Christie Moran – production assistant
- Stephen Morris – composer
- Shaffer "Ne-Yo" Smith – additional personnel, producer, rap, vocal producer
- Greg Ogan – engineer
- Deepu Panjwani – assistant engineer
- Ciarra Pardo – art direction, design
- Phillip Ramos – assistant engineer
- Makeba Riddick – vocal producer
- Rihanna – vocals
- Dusty Robbennolt – assistant engineer
- J. Peter Robinson – art direction, design
- Evan Rogers – background vocals, executive producer, producer
- Dan Satterwhite – tuba
- Christa Shaub – management
- Tyran "Ty Ty" Smith – A&R
- Chris Steinmetz – engineer
- Christopher "Tricky" Stewart – drum programming, keyboards, producer
- Bernt Rune Stray – guitar
- Tim Sturges – assistant engineer
- Carl Sturken – executive producer, instrumentation, musician, producer
- Rebecca Sweatman – production assistant
- Phil Tan – mixing
- Grayson Taylor – assistant engineer
- Dana Teboe – trombone
- Timbaland – producer
- Justin Timberlake – background vocals, vocal producer
- Mike Tocci – engineer
- Marcos Tovar – assistant engineer

== Charts ==
=== Weekly charts ===
2007 weekly chart performance for Good Girl Gone Bad
Chart (2007–2008)	Peak position
Australian Albums (ARIA)	2
Australian Urban Albums (ARIA)	1
Austrian Albums (Ö3 Austria)	3
Belgian Albums (Ultratop Flanders)	9
Belgian Albums (Ultratop Wallonia)	9
Canadian Albums (Billboard)	1
Croatian International Albums (HDU)	1
Czech Albums (IFPI)	3
Danish Albums (Hitlisten)	2
Dutch Albums (Album Top 100)	20
European Albums (Billboard)	3
Finnish Albums (Suomen virallinen lista)	7
French Albums (SNEP)	8
German Albums (Offizielle Top 100)	4
Hungarian Albums (MAHASZ)	4
Irish Albums (IRMA)	1
Italian Albums (FIMI)	21
Japanese Albums (Oricon)	7
Mexican Albums (Top 100 Mexico)	16
New Zealand Albums (RMNZ)	8
Norwegian Albums (VG-lista)	3
Polish Albums (OLiS)	3
Portuguese Albums (AFP)	24
Scottish Albums (Official Charts)	2
Spanish Albums (Promusicae)	9
Swedish Albums (Sverigetopplistan)	18
Swiss Albums (Schweizer Hitparade)	1
Taiwan International Albums (G-Music)	1
UK Albums (Official Charts)	1
UK R&B Albums (Official Charts)	1
US Billboard 200	2
US Top R&B/Hip-Hop Albums (Billboard)	3

2023 weekly chart performance for Good Girl Gone Bad
Chart (2023–2025)	Peak position
Portuguese Albums (AFP)	21
US Top R&B Albums (Billboard)	4

=== Year-end charts ===
2007 year-end chart performance for Good Girl Gone Bad
Chart (2007)	Position
Australian Albums (ARIA)	31
Austrian Albums (Ö3 Austria)	17
Belgian Albums (Ultratop Flanders)	17
Belgian Albums (Ultratop Wallonia)	25
Dutch Albums (Album Top 100)	47
French Albums (SNEP)	41
German Albums (Offizielle Top 100)	19
Hungarian Albums (Mahasz)	21
Irish Albums (IRMA)	11
Italian Albums (FIMI)	76
Japanese Albums (Oricon)	86
Mexican Albums (AMPROFON)	91
New Zealand Albums (RMNZ)	36
Swiss Albums (Schweizer Hitparade)	8
UK Albums (Official Charts)	10
US Billboard 200	57
US Top R&B/Hip-Hop Albums (Billboard)	33

2008 year-end chart performance for Good Girl Gone Bad
Chart (2008)	Position
Australian Albums (ARIA)	9
Austrian Albums (Ö3 Austria)	47
Belgian Albums (Ultratop Flanders)	30
Belgian Albums (Ultratop Wallonia)	32
Brazil Albums (Pro-Música Brasil)	15
Canadian Albums (Billboard)	8
Dutch Albums (Album Top 100)	56
French Albums (SNEP)	44
German Albums (Offizielle Top 100)	24
Hungarian Albums (Mahasz)	83
Irish Albums (IRMA)	8
Italian Albums (FIMI)	57
New Zealand Albums (RMNZ)	22
Spanish Albums (Promusicae)	37
Swiss Albums (Schweizer Hitparade)	25
UK Albums (Official Charts)	6
US Billboard 200	21
US Top R&B/Hip-Hop Albums (Billboard)	15

2009 weekly chart performance for Good Girl Gone Bad
Chart (2009)	Position
German Albums (Offizielle Top 100)	95
UK Albums (Official Charts)	63
US Billboard 200	70
US Top R&B/Hip-Hop Albums (Billboard)	45

2010 year-end chart performance for Good Girl Gone Bad
Chart (2010)	Position
UK Albums (Official Charts)	139

2011 year-end chart performance for Good Girl Gone Bad
Chart (2011)	Position
UK Albums (Official Charts)	87

2014 year-end chart performance for Good Girl Gone Bad
Chart (2016)	Position
Australian Urban Albums (ARIA)	100

2019 year-end chart performance for Good Girl Gone Bad
Chart (2019)	Position
Belgian Albums (Ultratop Flanders)	160

2020 year-end chart performance for Good Girl Gone Bad
Chart (2020)	Position
Belgian Albums (Ultratop Flanders)	122

2021 year-end chart performance for Good Girl Gone Bad
Chart (2021)	Position
Belgian Albums (Ultratop Flanders)	79
Danish Albums (Hitlisten)	84
Swedish Albums (Sverigetopplistan)	81

2022 year-end chart performance for Good Girl Gone Bad
Chart (2022)	Position
Belgian Albums (Ultratop Flanders)	100
Danish Albums (Hitlisten)	88
Swedish Albums (Sverigetopplistan)	87

2023 year-end chart performance for Good Girl Gone Bad
Chart (2023)	Position
Australian Albums (ARIA)	57
Belgian Albums (Ultratop Flanders)	87
Belgian Albums (Ultratop Wallonia)	180
Danish Albums (Hitlisten)	76
Dutch Albums (Album Top 100)	89
New Zealand Albums (RMNZ)	43
Swedish Albums (Sverigetopplistan)	62
UK Albums (Official Charts)	91

2024 year-end chart performance of Good Girl Gone Bad
Chart (2024)	Position
Australian Albums (ARIA)	48
Australian Hip Hop/R&B Albums (ARIA)	12
Belgian Albums (Ultratop Flanders)	61
Belgian Albums (Ultratop Wallonia)	125
Danish Albums (Hitlisten)	64
Dutch Albums (Album Top 100)	64
German Albums (Offizielle Top 100)	47
Hungarian Albums (MAHASZ)	61
Swiss Albums (Schweizer Hitparade)	34
UK Albums (Official Charts)	70
US Billboard 200	171

2025 year-end chart performance of Good Girl Gone Bad
Chart (2025)	Position
Australian Albums (ARIA)	55
Austrian Albums (Ö3 Austria)	35
Belgian Albums (Ultratop Flanders)	40
Belgian Albums (Ultratop Wallonia)	85
Dutch Albums (Album Top 100)	43
German Albums (Offizielle Top 100)	27
Hungarian Albums (MAHASZ)	33
Swiss Albums (Schweizer Hitparade)	18
UK Albums (Official Charts)	55
US Billboard 200	140
US Top R&B/Hip-Hop Albums (Billboard)	65

=== Decade-end charts ===
2000-2009 chart performance for Good Girl Gone Bad
Chart	Position
US Billboard 200	182

=== All-time charts ===
All-time chart performance for Good Girl Gone Bad
Chart	Position
Irish Female Albums (IRMA)	9
US Billboard 200 (Women)	59
US Top R&B/Hip-Hop Albums	68

== Certifications and sales ==
Certifications and sales for Good Girl Gone Bad
Region	Certification	Certified units/sales
Australia (ARIA)	8× Platinum	560,000^{‡}
Austria (IFPI Austria)	Platinum	20,000^{*}
Belgium (BRMA)	2× Platinum	60,000^{*}
Brazil (Pro-Música Brasil)	2× Platinum	120,000^{*}
Canada (Music Canada)	5× Platinum	500,000^{^}
Denmark (IFPI Danmark)	7× Platinum	140,000^{‡}
Finland (Musiikkituottajat)	Gold	16,002
France (SNEP)	Platinum	200,000^{*}
GCC (IFPI Middle East)	Platinum	6,000^{*}
Germany (BVMI)	4× Platinum	800,000^{‡}
Greece (IFPI Greece)	Gold	7,500^{^}
Hungary (MAHASZ)	Platinum	6,000^{^}
Ireland (IRMA)	3× Platinum	45,000^{^}
Italy (FIMI)	Platinum	50,000^{‡}
Japan (RIAJ)	Platinum	250,000^{^}
Mexico (AMPROFON)	Gold	50,000^{^}
Netherlands (NVPI)	Gold	35,000^{^}
New Zealand (RMNZ)	7× Platinum	105,000^{‡}
Norway	—	40,000
Poland (ZPAV)	Platinum	20,000^{*}
Portugal (AFP)	Gold	10,000^{^}
Russia (NFPF)	4× Platinum	80,000^{*}
Singapore (RIAS)	Platinum	10,000^{*}
South Korea	—	14,301
Spain (Promusicae)	Platinum	80,000^{^}
Sweden (GLF)	Gold	20,000^{^}
Switzerland (IFPI Switzerland)	3× Platinum	90,000^{^}
United Kingdom (BPI)	8× Platinum	2,400,000^{‡}
United States (RIAA)	7× Platinum	7,000,000^{‡}
Summaries
Europe (IFPI)	3× Platinum	3,000,000^{*}
Worldwide	—	9,000,000
^{*} Sales figures based on certification alone.^{^} Shipments figures based on certification alone.^{‡} Sales+streaming figures based on certification alone.

== Release history ==
Release dates for Good Girl Gone Bad
Country	Date	Format	Edition	Label
Portugal	May 31, 2007	CD	Standard	Universal Music Group
Netherlands	June 1, 2007	CD	Standard	Universal Music Group
Poland	June 1, 2007	CD	Standard	Universal Music Group
Finland	June 4, 2007	CD	Standard	Universal Music Group
United Kingdom	June 4, 2007	CD	Standard	Mercury Records
United States	June 5, 2007	CD	Standard	Def Jam Recordings
United States	June 5, 2007	LP	Standard	Def Jam Recordings
Germany	June 8, 2007	CD	Standard	Universal Music Group
Australia	June 12, 2007	LP	Standard	Universal Music Group
New Zealand	June 12, 2007	CD	Standard	Universal Music Group
France	June 13, 2007	Digital download	Standard	Universal Music Group
Japan	June 27, 2007	CD	Deluxe	Universal Music Group
Hong Kong	July 30, 2007	CD	Limited	Universal Music Group
Canada	December 4, 2007	CD	Limited	Universal Music Group

== See also ==
- List of number-one albums of 2007 (Canada)
- List of number-one albums of 2007 (Ireland)
- List of UK Albums Chart number ones of the 2000s
- List of best-selling albums of the 2000s in the United Kingdom
- List of albums which have spent the most weeks on the UK Albums Chart
