= Disturbia (song) =

2008 single by Rihanna

Single by Rihanna

from the album Good Girl Gone Bad: Reloaded
- Released: June 17, 2008
- Recorded: April 2008
- Studio: Rocky Mountain Recorders (Denver, Colorado)
- Genre: Dance-pop; electropop
- Length: 3:59
- Label: Def Jam; SRP
- Songwriters: Brian Kennedy; Chris Brown; Robert Allen; Andre Merritt
- Producers: Brian Kennedy; Makeba Riddick

Rihanna singles chronology
"If I Never See Your Face Again" (2008)	"Disturbia" (2008)	"Live Your Life" (2008)

Music video
- "Disturbia" on YouTube

"Disturbia" is a song by the Barbadian singer Rihanna from Good Girl Gone Bad: Reloaded (2008), a re-release of her third album Good Girl Gone Bad (2007). It was written by Andre Merritt, Chris Brown, Brian Kennedy and Rob. A!, with the production of the song helmed by Kennedy. The song was released as the third and final single from the re-release. "Disturbia" was sent to American contemporary hit radio on June 17, 2008, and was released as a CD single in the United Kingdom on July 22, 2008.

"Disturbia" is an uptempo dance-pop and electropop song with a "sizzling" beat. Lyrically, the song is about the experiences of depression, anxiety, anguish and confusion. The song received positive reviews from music critics, who generally praised its dark musical tone, lyrics and beat, and noted that it is reminiscent of Rihanna's previous single, "Don't Stop the Music" (2007). "Disturbia" earned Rihanna an award for Best International Song at the 2009 NRJ Music Awards and a nomination for Best Dance Recording at the 2009 Grammy Awards.

"Disturbia" was a commercial success, and peaked at number one in Belgium (Flanders) and New Zealand and became a top-ten hit in more than twenty countries including Australia, on the Canadian Hot 100, and the UK Singles Chart. The song topped the US Billboard Hot 100 chart for two consecutive weeks, and became Rihanna's third number-one single from Good Girl Gone Bad and fourth overall on the Hot 100. It is certified seven-times Platinum in the US and Gold or higher in eleven additional countries. The accompanying music video for "Disturbia" was directed by Anthony Mandler, which portrays Rihanna in various locations such as in a prison cell and gas chamber. "Disturbia" has regularly featured on the set lists of Rihanna's tours and live performances since its release.

== Background ==
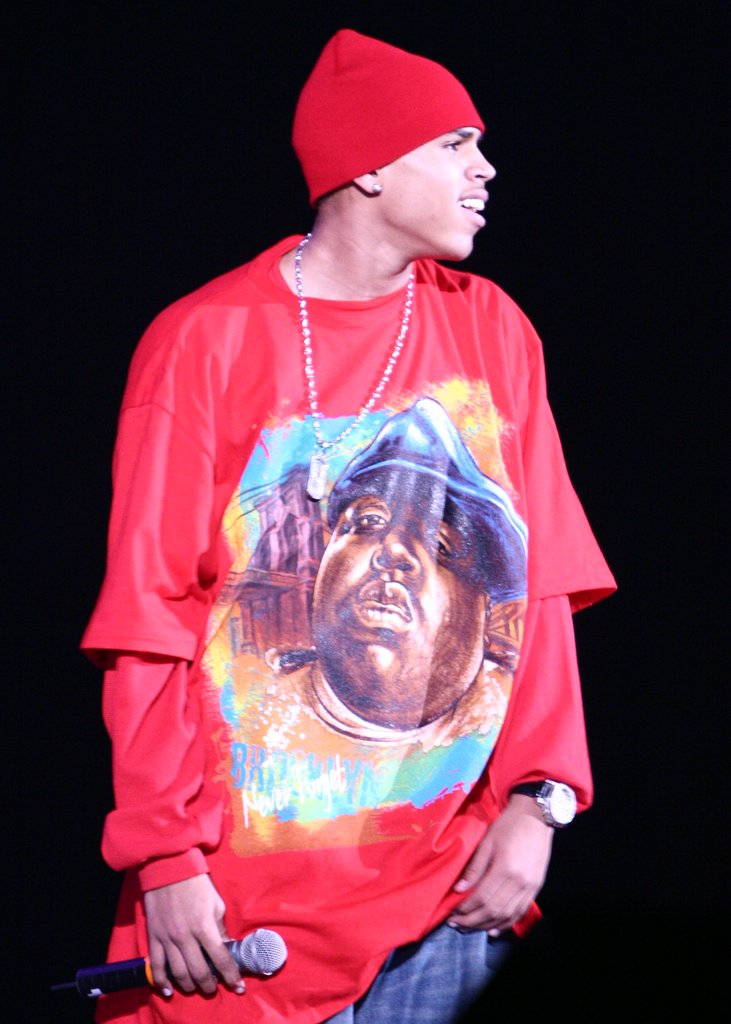
"Disturbia" was co-written by Chris Brown.

"Disturbia" was written by American recording artist Chris Brown and his team which included Brian Kennedy, Rob. A!, and Andre Merritt, better known as the Graffiti Artizts. The track was originally considered to be part of the re-release edition of Brown's second studio album, Exclusive (2007). However, after finishing the song, he took preference to another song, "Forever", which later became the lead single from his re-released album, titled Exclusive: The Forever Edition (2008). He felt that "Disturbia" would be better suited for a female singer and instead forwarded the song to Rihanna. When writing the song, he was inspired "to go totally left and kind of weird". Speaking to USA Today, Brown described his feelings with regard to him giving the song to Rihanna: "It's fun being creative and even if you have a concept in your head to write about, you can write it and give it to someone else because it might not personally fit you, but it might be an idea you have."

"Disturbia" was recorded in April 2008 at Rocky Mountain Recorders in Denver, Colorado. Speaking to Nick Levine of Digital Spy, Rihanna explained: "I went into the studio making music my way. I found myself all at once." In an interview on This Morning, Rihanna said that the song is not necessarily about a specific personal experience, but rather the general feelings of mental anguish, anxiety and confusion. Rihanna further explained that she wanted to record the song because she felt that listeners would be able to relate to the subject matter. When Good Girl Gone Bad was repackaged as Good Girl Gone Bad: Reloaded, Rihanna approached L.A. Reid, boss of Def Jam, suggesting to release "Disturbia" as a single and follow-up to "Take a Bow". Speaking to MTV News, Reid said, "It was the first time Rihanna actually came to me and said, 'Here's the song I want to put out.' She played me the song. That was her taking control [...] She understands what hits are, and she knows what she wants to say. She's at that place where she can do that."

== Composition ==
Rihanna "Disturbia"
A 23-second sample of song's chorus that can be likened in similarity to Eiffel 65's "Blue (Da Ba Dee)" (1999).

Musically, "Disturbia" is an uptempo dance-pop and electropop song with a "sizzling" beat. The song is reminiscent of Rihanna's previous single "Don't Stop the Music" (2007). The rock-tinged song opens with a horror movie-like scream, followed by the hook "Bum-bum-be-dum-bum-bum-be-dum-bum" which has been likened to the "Ella-ella-ella-ey-ey" hook from her 2007 hit single "Umbrella" (featuring Jay-Z). BBC News interpreted it as Rihanna singing about being frightened but felt that its lyrics made no sense.

Fraser McAlpine from BBC Music has claimed that the song's chorus can be likened to Eiffel 65's "Blue (Da Ba Dee)" (1999). According to digital music sheet published at Musicnotes.com by Sony/ATV Music Publishing, "Disturbia" is composed in a key of B minor and is set in common time with a moderate techno-pop groove. Rihanna's vocal range spans from the lower note of D_{3} to the high note of F♯_{5} and the track follows a chord progression of Bm-D-A-G in the verses and chorus. The song features various vocal effects, namely the use of Auto-Tune and a vocoder in contrast with the detached electronic bounce of the song and its weaving, winding melody.

== Reception and accolades ==
"Disturbia" received positive reviews from contemporary music critics. Josh Tyrangiel of Time complimented the song's "rubber-ball melodies that bounce around your head". Alex Fletcher of Digital Spy said that unlike the usual seventh single release by an artist, "Disturbia" is one of Rihanna's stronger releases and that it proves that she is ruling '08 much like she did '07. He went on to describe it as a "fun-packed electro treat filled with sizzling beats and crazy vocal effects." Fletcher further highlighted the song's strong intro hook and said that the chorus is her catchiest since "Umbrella". Spence D of IGN felt that the track has an infectious "Bum-bum-be-dum-bum-bum" hook that sucks you into the detached electronic bounce of the track. Jaime Gill from Yahoo! Music highlighted the song's "insistent hook, sturdy beat and weaving, winding melody." Fraser McAlpine from the BBC Music deemed the song's plus points to be Rihanna's icy whine, the frosty-rave chorus and the Eiffel 65-like refrain.

Billboard ranked the song at number nine on its list of "Songs of the Summer of 2008". Time magazine has named the song on number two on its list of '10 Best Songs of the Summer', only behind Kid Rock's "All Summer Long". According to Caryn Ganz of Rolling Stone, "Disturbia" was the second best song of 2008, only behind MGMT's "Kids". The song won the award for Best International Song at the 2009 NRJ Music Awards, however, after a miscommunication, Katy Perry accepted the award for her single "I Kissed a Girl". Later, it was revealed that originally Rihanna won the award. The song also earned Rihanna a nomination for Best Dance Recording at the 51st Annual Grammy Awards, but lost to Daft Punk's "Harder, Better, Faster, Stronger".

== Chart performance ==
"Disturbia" debuted on the US Billboard Hot 100 at number eighteen on June 26, 2008, becoming Rihanna's sixth top 20 from Good Girl Gone Bad. In the issue dated August 14, 2008 the song topped the chart, selling 148,000 downloads according to Nielsen SoundScan and replaced Katy Perry's "I Kissed a Girl" after seven weeks at the top. "Disturbia" became Rihanna's fourth number-one song on the chart only after "SOS", "Umbrella" and "Take a Bow", and tied her with Beyoncé and Mariah Carey for most number-one singles of the decade. The single topped the chart for two consecutive weeks. For the Billboard issue dated September 13, 2008, "Disturbia" also topped both the Hot Dance Club Play and Hot Dance Airplay charts. The song also peaked at number one on the US Billboard Pop Songs, becoming her third number one on the chart, after "Unfaithful" and "Take a Bow". "Disturbia" has been certified six-times platinum by the RIAA, having sold 4.8 million digital copies as of June 2015, marking Rihanna's third best-selling single in the country. The song was also successful in Canada, where it peaked at number two on the Canadian Hot 100, remaining at the position for five weeks.

In the United Kingdom, following the release of Good Girl Gone Bad: Reloaded, "Disturbia" debuted on the UK Singles Chart at number forty-seven due to strong digital sales. After the release of the music video, the song re-entered the chart at number forty-seven, ultimately peaking at number three from digital sales. The song remained within the top ten for eleven weeks, marking Rihanna's eighth top ten single in the country. "Disturbia" also became Rihanna's third longest charting single in the UK, having spent 36 weeks in the top 100, being passed only by "Don't Stop the Music" and the worldwide hit single "Umbrella". "Disturbia" has sold over 430,000 copies in the country as of 2010.

Elsewhere in Europe, "Disturbia" managed a huge commercial success and reached the top ten in fifteen other countries. The song debuted on number three in France and stayed there for one week, becoming Rihanna's eighth entry and fourth top ten-hit after "Unfaithful" (2006), "Umbrella" (2007) and "Don't Stop the Music" (2007). "Disturbia" stayed on the French Singles Chart for 39 weeks, becoming Rihanna's longest charting single on it at the time, until "Only Girl (In the World)" (2010). The single was as well successful in Belgium (Flanders) where it peaked at number one and managed to peak at number four in Belgium (Wallonia). It was later certified Gold by the Belgian Entertainment Association for selling over 10,000 copies. In Spain, "Disturbia" reached a peak of ten and was also certified Gold by the Productores de Música de España. The song managed to reach number two in Finland, number three in Norway, number four in Austria, Denmark, Hungary, Switzerland and on the Irish Singles Chart, number five in Germany, number seven in Slovakia, and number ten in Czech Republic and Netherlands. It also reached number one in New Zealand, becoming Rihanna's third number one single, and her first since "Umbrella". On August 23, 2009 "Disturbia" was certified Platinum, for selling over 15,000 copies. In Australia, it managed to reach number six. It was certified Gold on the downloads alone, before the physical release several weeks later, when it was subsequently certified Platinum.

== Music video ==
=== Background ===
The music video for "Disturbia" was filmed in Los Angeles, California. Originally, it was reported that the video was directed by American photographer and director, David LaChapelle, who previously directed Christina Aguilera and Redman's "Dirrty" (2002) and Gwen Stefani and Eve's "Rich Girl" (2004). However, later sources surfaced stating that the video was directed by Rihanna's long collaborator Anthony Mandler, who previously directed her music videos for "Shut Up and Drive" (2007), "Hate That I Love You" (2007) and "Take a Bow" (2008). Rihanna also co-directed the video, becoming her second work after the co-direction for the 2007 single "Don't Stop the Music". The "Disturbia" music video, was released exclusively on iTunes on July 22, 2008.

=== Synopsis and reception ===
A shot from the music video where Rihanna is seen imprisoned. She is wearing lenses that make her look as if her eyes have rolled into the back of her head.

The music video for "Disturbia" begins in a surrealistic, circus-like torture chamber where Rihanna is seen dressed in black, wearing dark make-up and long black nails while she presses the keys of a big dark piano and looks into the camera. As the song starts, a series of images of Rihanna are shown. In one of the scenes, she is seen imprisoned wearing lenses that make it look as if her eyes have rolled into the back of her head. Rihanna stays in the prison with two guards watching on her from both sides. Other scenes include Rihanna sitting on a throne chair and singing the song, while two strange women (one is played by American drag queen Detox Icunt) surround her. Then, multiple people around her are holding her in front of a gas chamber. During the first chorus, Rihanna is seen tied to a bed from which she can't escape. In the next scene, Rihanna and her dancers perform a Thriller-esque dance routine. As the second verse starts, Rihanna is seen holding a column and fire is around her. As the song continues, Rihanna drags a man doll around a metal web. In the second chorus, she is in a room where her hands are stuck in the wall and her legs in the floor; she is wearing a leotard made out of barbed wire, while tarantulas crawl all over her body. During the bridge, Rihanna is in a very tiny room, with her hands and legs chained up from which she can't escape. The video ends with Rihanna turning around in her chair whilst looking into the camera.

According to Tamar Anitai from MTV Buzzworthy, "Disturbia" is "yin to the yang of Chris Brown's 'Wall to Wall' which features creepy-crawly chicks climbing the walls in latex." She later listed the video at number five on the "Buzzworthy's Top 5 Most Paranoid Music Videos" stating: "In Rihanna's 'Disturbia' video, obsession manifests itself in freaky-deaky tarantulas, wigs, wolves, and a creepy dude in an eye patch. And S&M-y corsets. Paranoia never looked so supernaturally sexy!". Simon Vozick-Levinson from Entertainment Weekly also reviewed the video commenting: "It looks like she accidentally wandered into Nine Inch Nails' 'Closer' video, or else some sort of freaky Victorian mental hospital". He later continued saying that the video is not what he expected from a dance-pop song, but that "it's also cool that Rihanna is trying something new." Jillian Mapes of Billboard wrote that in the video, Rihanna created "a memorable and edgy image akin more to Marilyn Manson than her Top 40 colleagues." The video was voted the sixth-best music video of the 2000s in a Billboard poll.

== Live performances ==
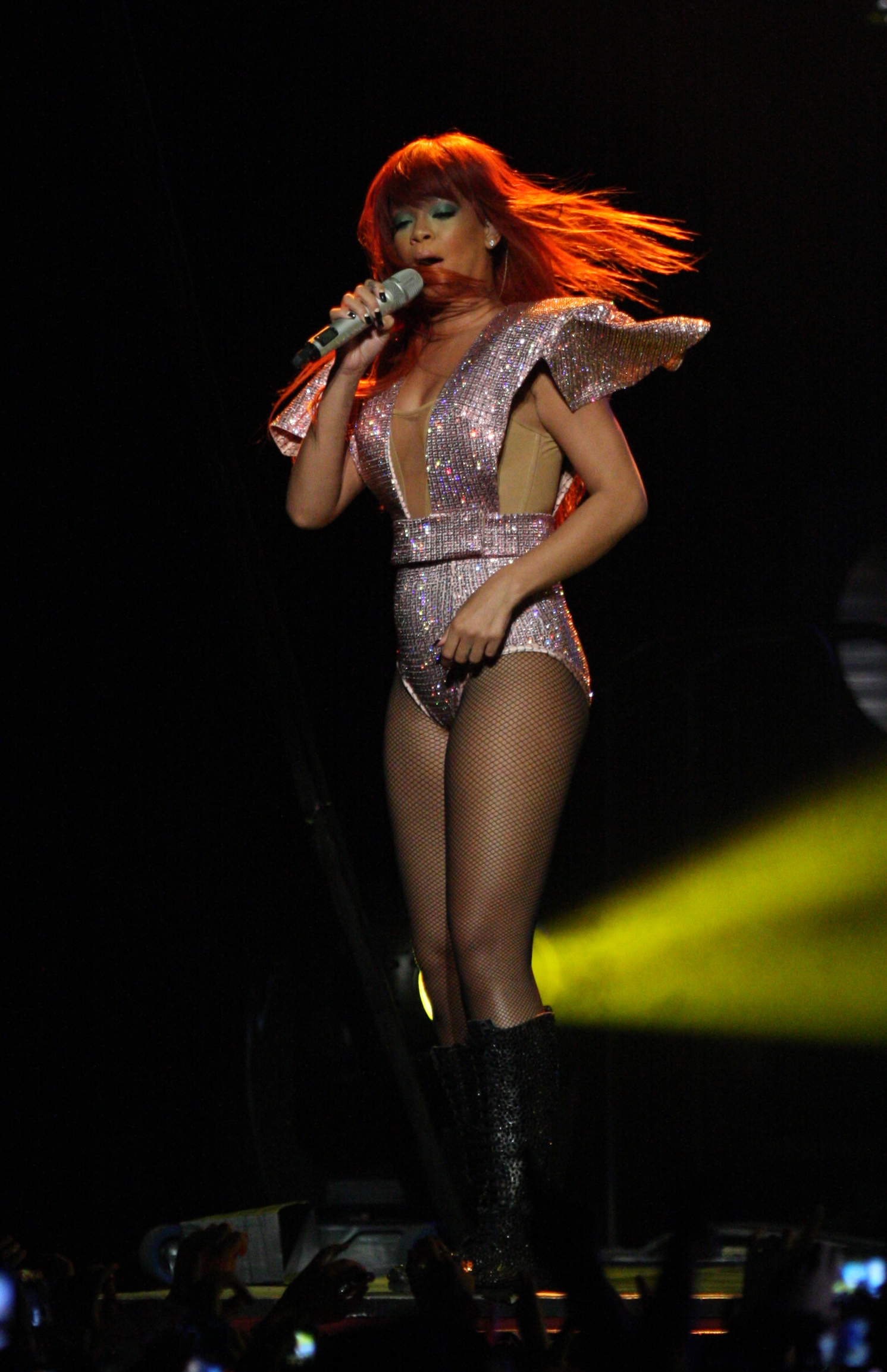
Rihanna performing "Disturbia" on the Australian leg of the Last Girl on Earth

Rihanna performed "Disturbia" for first time at the 2008 MTV Video Music Awards. The song opened the show, and was performed after Britney Spears' opening speech. Rihanna performed it while revealing a leather "goth inspired" outfit. Together with the dancer troops, she performed a Thriller inspired dance, with glow sticks and leather props being used through the performance. About the performance, Brian Orloff from People commented that "after Britney left, the stage was ceded to a futuristic-looking Rihanna, who launched into her hit 'Disturbia' with a goth-theme." In 2011, according to poll made by Billboard, the performance was the tenth best ever on the MTV Video Music Awards. On September 19, 2008, Rihanna went to France, to perform "Disturbia" at Star Academy France. Following the performance of the song, Good Girl Gone Bad: Reloaded soared from number forty-three to number eleven and peaked at number eight the following week, becoming Rihanna's first album to reach the top ten in France. Rihanna also performed "Disturbia" at the NFL Pepsi Smash Super Bowl Bash in Tampa, Florida held the Thursday and Friday prior to the 2009 Super Bowl. It was the first song on the set-list that also featured other songs from her latest release Good Girl Gone Bad. The performance of the song featured a sample from the White Stripes song "Seven Nation Army" and flames that shot up across the front of the stage.

Following the release of her fourth studio album Rated R (2009), Rihanna held a Nokia promotional concert at Brixton Academy in London. Rihanna performed the song as part of a set list, which included some songs from the new release: "Russian Roulette", "Wait Your Turn" and "Hard", the latter of which Rihanna was joined on stage by Young Jeezy, to perform the song together. However, during the set, Rihanna also performed other songs from Good Girl Gone Bad, including "Don't Stop the Music" and "Take a Bow". On February 5, 2010, Rihanna performed at the Pepsi Super Bowl in Miami, Florida, performing "Disturbia" in a medley with other songs including "Russian Roulette" and "Wait Your Turn". In February 2010 she also recorded an AOL Sessions, where she performed the song together with other tracks including "Hard", "Rude Boy" and "Take a Bow".

Rihanna performed "Disturbia" on her three major tours: Good Girl Gone Bad (2007—09), Last Girl on Earth (2010—11) and the Loud Tour (2011). The song was added on the Good Girl Gone Bad Tour set list during the Australasian leg of the tour. It was the opening song, performed only after the intro on the tour. Rihanna also performed "Disturbia" on her second major concert tour, Last Girl on Earth Tour. Rihanna performed a slower ballad remix tempo of the song, surrounded by three big four-legged insect monsters as she crawled on the floor to escape while singing it. About the performance Lisa Wilton from Calgary Sun commented that: "Rihanna's goth side came out – and by 'goth side' I mean she sang alongside dancers dressed as freaky, giant spiders – during the darker dancefloor anthem, 'Disturbia'." On her Loud Tour, Rihanna performed "Disturbia" as second track, only after the opening song "Only Girl (In the World)". Rihanna performed the song in a brightly colored sequined bikini, while partially been dragging on a moveable floor. Rob Williams from Winnipeg Free Press stated: "Rihanna dropped her blue coat to reveal a jewel-encrusted bikini for 'Disturbia'. It was the first of numerous costume changes that showed off her fashion sense and plenty of skin." Rihanna performed "Disturbia" at Radio 1's Hackney Weekend on May 24, 2012, as the second song on the setlist.

== Formats and track listing ==
Digital download

1. "Disturbia" (Album Version) – 4:00
2. "Disturbia" (Instrumental) – 3:58

Digital Remixes

1. "Disturbia" (Jody den Broeder Remix) – 7:45
2. "Disturbia" (Craig C's Master Vocal Mix) – 9:17
3. "Disturbia" (Craig C's and Nique's Tribal Mayhem Mix) – 8:21
4. "Disturbia" (Jody den Broeder Bum Bum Dub) – 8:15
5. "Disturbia" (Craig C's Disturbstramental Mix) – 9:17

FR Extended Play

1. "Disturbia" (Album Version) – 4:00
2. "Disturbia" (Jody den Broeder Radio Edit) – 3:52
3. "Disturbia" (Instrumental) – 3:58

UK and German CD single

1. "Disturbia" – 3:58
2. "Disturbia" (Jody den Broeder Radio Edit) – 3:52
3. "Disturbia" (Instrumental) – 3:58
4. "Disturbia" (Music video) – 4:20

== Credits and personnel ==
Credits are taken from Good Girl Gone Bad: Reloaded liner notes.

- Lead Vocals by Rihanna
- Backing vocals by Andre Meritt and Chris Brown
- Written and composed by Andre Meritt, Chris Brown, Brian Kennedy and Robert Allen
- Produced by Brian Kennedy
- Recorded at the Rocky Mountain Recorders in Denver, Colorado
- Recorded by Andrew Vastola
- Vocal Production by Makeba Riddick
- Mixed by Phil Tan
- Assistant: Carlos Oyanedel

== Charts ==
=== Weekly charts ===
Weekly chart performance
Chart (2008–2009)	Peak position
Australia (ARIA)	6
Austria (Ö3 Austria Top 40)	4
Belgium (Ultratop 50 Flanders)	1
Belgium (Ultratop 50 Wallonia)	4
Bulgaria (BAMP)	5
Canada Hot 100 (Billboard)	2
CIS Airplay (TopHit)	4
Croatia (HRT)	3
Czech Republic Airplay (ČNS IFPI)	10
Denmark (Tracklisten)	4
European Hot 100 Singles (Billboard)	2
Finland (Suomen virallinen lista)	2
France (SNEP)	3
Germany (GfK)	5
Hungary (Dance Top 40)	5
Hungary (Rádiós Top 40)	4
Hungary (Single Top 40)	9
Ireland (IRMA)	4
Israel (Media Forest)	2
Italy (FIMI)	14
Mexico Anglo (Monitor Latino)	6
Netherlands (Dutch Top 40)	10
Netherlands (Single Top 100)	12
New Zealand (Recorded Music NZ)	1
Norway (VG-lista)	3
Poland (Polish Airplay Charts)	2
Portugal (Billboard)	6
Romania (Romanian Top 100)	7
Russia Airplay (TopHit)	8
Slovakia Airplay (ČNS IFPI)	7
Spain (Promusicae)	10
Sweden (Sverigetopplistan)	4
Switzerland (Schweizer Hitparade)	4
UK Singles (Official Charts)	3
Ukraine Airplay (TopHit)	8
US Billboard Hot 100	1
US Adult Pop Songs	31
US Dance Club Songs (Billboard)	1
US Dance Airplay (Billboard)	1
US Hot R&B/Hip-Hop Songs (Billboard)	88
US Pop Airplay (Billboard)	1
US Pop 100 (Billboard)	1
US Rhythmic Airplay (Billboard)	8
Venezuela Pop Rock (Record Report)	1

2023 weekly chart performance
Chart (2023)	Peak position
US Digital Song Sales (Billboard)	34
US Hot Dance/Electronic Songs (Billboard)	10

Weekly chart performance
Chart (2026)	Peak position
Global 200 (Billboard)	109
UK Hip Hop/R&B (Official Charts)	6

=== Year-end charts ===
2008 year-end chart performance
Chart (2008)	Position
Australia (ARIA)	22
Austria (Ö3 Austria Top 40)	45
Belgium (Ultratop 50 Flanders)	23
Belgium (Ultratop 50 Wallonia)	71
Brazil (Crowley)	66
Canada (Canadian Hot 100)	8
Canada CHR/Top 40 (Billboard)	4
CIS (TopHit)	74
European Hot 100 Singles (Billboard)	17
France (SNEP)	49
Germany (Media Control GfK)	41
Hungary (Dance Top 40)	36
Hungary (Rádiós Top 40)	34
Ireland (IRMA)	18
Netherlands (Dutch Top 40)	38
Netherlands (Single Top 100)	51
New Zealand (RIANZ)	21
Russia Airplay (TopHit)	78
Sweden (Sverigetopplistan)	36
Switzerland (Schweizer Hitparade)	21
UK Singles (OCC)	18
UK Urban (Music Week)	14
US Billboard Hot 100	16
US Hot Dance Airplay (Billboard)	10
US Mainstream Top 40 (Billboard)	11
US Rhythmic Airplay (Billboard)	40

2009 year-end chart performance
Chart (2009)	Position
Canada (Canadian Hot 100)	91
European Hot 100 Singles (Billboard)	49
Hungary (Dance Top 40)	81
Hungary (Rádiós Top 40)	52
Spain (PROMUSICAE)	46
Switzerland (Schweizer Hitparade)	74
US Billboard Hot 100	77

2023 year-end chart performance
Chart (2023)	Position
US Hot Dance/Electronic Songs (Billboard)	91

=== Decade-end charts ===
Decade-end chart performance
Chart (2000–2009)	Position
US Billboard Hot 100	64

== Certifications and sales ==
Certifications and sales
Region	Certification	Certified units/sales
Australia (ARIA)	9× Platinum	630,000^{‡}
Belgium (BRMA)	Gold	
Brazil (Pro-Música Brasil)	2× Platinum	120,000^{‡}
Canada Digital downloads	—	145,000
Denmark (IFPI Danmark)	2× Platinum	180,000^{‡}
Germany (BVMI)	3× Gold	450,000^{‡}
Italy (FIMI)	Gold	35,000^{‡}
New Zealand (RMNZ)	4× Platinum	120,000^{‡}
Spain (Promusicae)	Gold	30,000^{‡}
Spain (Promusicae) Ringtone	Platinum	20,000^{*}
Sweden (GLF)	Gold	10,000^{‡}
United Kingdom (BPI)	3× Platinum	1,800,000^{‡}
United States (RIAA)	7× Platinum	7,000,000^{‡}
^{*} Sales figures based on certification alone.^{^} Shipments figures based on certification alone.^{‡} Sales+streaming figures based on certification alone.

== Release history ==
Release dates and formats
Region	Date	Format	Label	Ref.
United States	June 17, 2008	Contemporary hit radio	Def Jam	
United States	June 24, 2008	Rhythmic radio	Def Jam	
United Kingdom	July 22, 2008	CD Single	Def Jam	
United States	August 5, 2008	Digital download (Remixes)	Def Jam	
Germany	September 26, 2008	Enhanced CD	Def Jam	
Australia	September 29, 2008	Digital download	Def Jam	
Germany	October 3, 2008	CD	Def Jam	
France	October 20, 2008	CD		

== See also ==
- List of Ultratop 50 number-one singles of 2008
- New Zealand top 50 singles of 2008
- List of Billboard Hot 100 number ones of 2008
- List of Billboard Hot Dance Club Play number ones of 2008
- List of best-selling singles in the United States
