= If I Never See Your Face Again =

2008 single by Maroon 5

Single by Maroon 5 featuring Rihanna

from the album It Won't Be Soon Before Long and Good Girl Gone Bad: Reloaded
- Released: May 2, 2008
- Studio: Conway Recording Studios (Los Angeles, CA); Glenwood Place Studios (Burbank, CA); Phantom Studios (Westlake Village, CA)
- Genre: Pop rock; R&B; post-disco; synth-pop
- Length: 3:18
- Label: A&M Octone
- Songwriters: Adam Levine; James Valentine
- Producers: Mark Endert; Mike Elizondo; Mark "Spike" Stent; C. "Tricky" Stewart; Maroon 5

Maroon 5 singles chronology
"Won't Go Home Without You" (2007)	"If I Never See Your Face Again" (2008)	"Goodnight Goodnight" (2008)

Rihanna singles chronology
"Take a Bow" (2008)	"If I Never See Your Face Again" (2008)	"Disturbia" (2008)

Music video
- "If I Never See Your Face Again" on YouTube

"If I Never See Your Face Again" is a song by the American pop rock band Maroon 5 from the June 2008 re-release of the group's second album, It Won't Be Soon Before Long (2007), serving as the fourth single. It was also included as the second single in the June 2008 re-release of Rihanna's third album titled Good Girl Gone Bad: Reloaded (2008). The song was originally included on the standard version of Maroon 5's album without Rihanna. It was written by band members Adam Levine and James Valentine, with production of the song helmed by Christopher "Tricky" Stewart, Mike Elizondo, Mark Endert, Mark "Spike" Stent and Maroon 5. It was released as an extended play (EP) in Australia on May 22, 2007, and as an official single on May 2, 2008, in the United States.

"If I Never See Your Face Again" was originally intended to be a duet with Janet Jackson, to appear on her Discipline album, but label problems interfered. The collaboration with Rihanna later came to fruition when Levine asked her to add her vocal to the remix version, which she accepted. "If I Never See Your Face Again" is a pop and R&B song featuring instrumentation provided by synthesizers and a guitar. The song received a mixed response from music critics, who praised the song's composition but criticized Levine and Rihanna's vocal performances. The song's accompanying music video was directed by Anthony Mandler and shot on an indoor soundstage in Castaic, California. The song was nominated for Best Pop Collaboration With Vocals at the 2009 Grammy Awards, marking the first nomination in the category for both artists. It was also featured on the television series The Hills and the 2009 film He's Just Not That Into You, as the song's original version.

== Background ==
"If I Never See Your Face Again" was written by Adam Levine and James Valentine, two of the five band members from Maroon 5. Production of the song was helmed by Mike Elizondo, Mark Endert, Mike "Spike" Stent, Christopher "Tricky" Stewart and Maroon 5. It was recorded by "Spike" Stent at Conway Studios, Hollywood, CA; Glenwood Place Studios, Burbank, CA and Phantom Studios, Westlake Village, CA. The song was originally intended to be a duet with Janet Jackson and appear on her 2008 Discipline album, but due to label problems Rihanna later appeared on the song.

The song was included on the standard version of Maroon 5's 2007 album It Won't Be Soon Before Long without the inclusion of Rihanna, however, Levine stated in an interview with James Montgomery for MTV News whilst on set of the accompanying music video that he wanted to try something different for the album's re-release. The singer continued, saying that he asked Rihanna to do some "bits and pieces" in the recording studio and that it came together very “quickly”. Levine stated that if there is "magic" between two artists, then "you don't even have to think about it." During the interview, Rihanna confirmed that the song would be the only one to feature a collaboration on her re-release of her 2007 album Good Girl Gone Bad, entitled Good Girl Gone Bad: Reloaded revealing that she had always wanted to work with the group and was honored when they contacted her. "If I Never See Your Face Again" was released as a single in the United States on May 2, 2008.

== Composition ==
"If I Never See Your Face Again"
"If I Never See Your Face Again" is an R&B song that incorporates a "jagged" use of synthesizers and "buzzing" guitars in its production.

"If I Never See Your Face Again" is a pop and R&B song, which lasts for 3:18 (3 minutes, 18 seconds) and is written in the key of G# Dorian. Instrumentation is provided by synths, and a guitar. A reviewer for IGN noted that "If I Never See Your Face Again" is complete with "slinky synth insinuations," whilst Jerome Blakeney for BBC wrote that it is a "guitar drenched" and "synth-crunching" song. Alex Fletcher for Digital Spy commented that the song incorporated a "jagged" use of synthesizers. For the most part of the song, Levine sings in his falsetto register, whilst Rihanna adopts "silky tone".

== Critical reception ==
Upon the release of It Won't Be Soon Before Long, music critics commented on the original version of the song, which does not include guest vocals by Rihanna. Jerome Blakeney for BBC wrote that "If I Never See Your Face Again", along with another It Won't Be Soon Before Long track "Makes Me Wonder", were "monster weapons of mass-marketing aimed at the feet and riding on swathes of string-drenched, synth-crunching disco." A reviewer for IGN was complimentary of 'If I Never See Your Face Again', writing that it is hard to resist listening to the song. The reviewer also noted that Levine appeared to adopt a vocal style reminiscent of techniques employed by Justin Timberlake, writing "Like Justin Timberlake it's all about the high pitched tenor falsetto and some sinewy grooves."

Bill Lamb for About.com noted that "If I Never See Your Face Again" and "Makes Me Wonder" appeared to be inspired by British jazz funk and acid jazz band Jamiroquai, writing "Any Jamiroquai fan may call foul if they listen to 'If I Never See Your Face Again' or 'Makes Me Wonder'." Sal Cinquemani was critical of the song, labeling it as "nasty." Alex Fletcher for Digital Spy disapproved of the collaboration between the band and Rihanna, with specific thoughts on Levine and Rihanna's pairing. Fletcher was critical of their vocal performances, writing that their voices clashed with one another and that "the sexual chemistry radar for the pairing registers at zero." Fletcher commented about the song further, writing that it should never have left the recording studio.

=== Accolades ===
Accolades
Year	Ceremony	Category	Result	Ref.
2009	Grammy Awards	Best Pop Collaboration with Vocals	Nominated	

== Chart performance ==
"If I Never See Your Face Again" achieved moderate chart success on singles charts around the world. It debuted on the Australian Singles Chart at number 28 June 1, 2008, and peaked at number 11 in its sixth week. The song debuted on the New Zealand Singles Chart at number 37 on June 9, 2008, and peaked at number 21 the following week. In Europe, the song debuted and peaked at number 15 on the Italian Singles Chart on July 17, 2008. The song remained on the chart for one week. It debuted on the Dutch Singles Chart at number 35 on June 14, 2008, and peaked at number 20 the following week. The song fluctuated between positions in the twenties and seventies for 13 weeks. It debuted on the Danish Singles Chart at number 36 on July 27, 2008, and peaked at number 31 in its sixth week.

"If I Never See Your Face Again" debuted on the Swiss Singles Chart at number 61 on June 29, 2008, and peaked at number 52 the following week, where it remained in its third week. It debuted on the Austrian Singles Chart at number 67 on September 5, 2008, and peaked at number 54 the following week. "If I Never See Your Face Again" debuted and peaked on the UK Singles Chart at number 28 on June 14, 2008. Over the following two weeks, the song descend down the top-forty, before falling out in its third week. The song made a re-entry on the chart at number 36 on July 7, 2008. In the United States, the song peaked at number 51 on the Billboard Hot 100 chart on July 26, 2008. It peaked at number 10 on the Adult Pop Songs chart; number 30 on the Pop Songs chart and 21 on the Hot Digital Songs chart.

== Music video ==
Adam Levine and Rihanna in the music video, where they try to not succumb to each other's temptations.

The song's accompanying music video was directed by Anthony Mandler, and shot on an indoor soundstage in Castaic, California on April 23, 2008. The concept for the video was "high-end erotica". In an interview with James Montgomery for MTV News whilst on set of the music video, Levine provided a summary of what the video would entail, saying: "It's this kind of ultra-glamorous, photography-based, late-'70s/ early-'80s situation. It's really stylish and really beautiful ... It's the most choreographed thing I've ever done, because usually I just get up there and screw around. But with Rihanna, it's completely different and so cool." In response, Rihanna continued to say that "I don't do a lot of videos where I have so much chemistry with the other artist, and this is only my second duet in a video ... It's really intense, because you have to work with each other so much. It's new for me, but I'm enjoying it."

The video was made available to download digitally via iTunes on May 13, 2008.

=== Synopsis ===
The video begins with the sound of a ticking clock and Levine and Rihanna sitting opposite each other at a table, tapping their hands and staring at one another. Maroon 5 start to play their instruments as Rihanna sits and watches them. The table and band scenes are intercut with each other for the first verse and chorus. In the second verse, Levine and Rihanna appear to argue and try to ignore the other's advances. Rihanna lies suggestively on a bed while Levine sits on a chair with his head turned in the opposite direction for the bridge. For the final chorus, the pair appear to reconcile, ending with Levine finally giving in to temptation. He walks to the end of the table where Rihanna sits and caresses her neck, causing her to lean towards him seductively. The two nearly kiss as the video ends.

== Formats and track listings ==
- Album versions
1. "If I Never See Your Face Again" – 3:21
2. "If I Never See Your Face Again" (feat. Rihanna) – 3:18
- Digital download
1. "If I Never See Your Face Again" (feat. Rihanna) – 3:18
- Australian extended play (EP)
1. "If I Never See Your Face Again" – 3:18
2. "If I Never See Your Face Again" (Paul Oakenfold Remix Edit) – 3:30
3. "If I Never See Your Face Again" (Live from MSN Control Room) – 4:11

== Credits and personnel ==
Recording

- Recorded at Conway Studios, Hollywood, CA; Glenwood Place Studios, Burbank, CA; Phantom Studios, Westlake Village, CA; House of Blues Studios, Encino, CA and Henson Studios, Hollywood, CA.
- Mixed at Scream Studios, Miami, FL.

Personnel Credits are adapted from the liner notes of Good Girl Gone Bad: Reloaded, Def Jam Recordings.

- Songwriting – Adam Levine, James Valentine
- Production – Christopher "Tricky" Stewart, Mike Elizondo, Mark Endert, Mark "Spike" Stent, Maroon 5
- Recording – Mark "Spike" Stent
- Mixing – Mike Endert
- Mixing assistant – Doug Johnson
- Adam Levine - lead vocals, guitar
- James Valentine - guitar, backing vocals
- Mickey Madden - bass guitar
- Matt Flynn - drums, percussion

== Charts ==
=== Weekly charts ===
Weekly chart performance
Chart (2008)	Peak position
Australia (ARIA)	11
Austria (Ö3 Austria Top 40)	54
Belgium (Ultratip Bubbling Under Flanders)	18
Canada Hot 100 (Billboard)	12
Canada Hot AC (Billboard)	11
Canada CHR/Top 40 (Billboard)	27
CIS Airplay (TopHit)	142
Denmark (Tracklisten)	31
European Hot 100 Singles (Billboard)	59
Ireland (IRMA)	16
Italy (FIMI)	15
Japan Hot 100 (Billboard)	97
Netherlands (Dutch Top 40)	11
Netherlands (Single Top 100)	20
New Zealand (Recorded Music NZ)	21
Switzerland (Schweizer Hitparade)	52
UK Singles (Official Charts)	28
US Billboard Hot 100	51
US Adult Pop Airplay (Billboard)	10
US Pop Airplay (Billboard)	30

=== Year-end charts ===
Year-end chart performance
Chart (2008)	Position
Australia (ARIA)	69
Canada (Canadian Hot 100)	43
Netherlands (Dutch Top 40)	35
US Adult Top 40 (Billboard)	34

== Certifications ==
Certifications and sales
Region	Certification	Certified units/sales
Australia (ARIA)	Platinum	70,000^{^}
Brazil (Pro-Música Brasil)	Gold	30,000^{‡}
Canada (Music Canada)	Gold	40,000^{*}
United States (RIAA)	Platinum	1,109,000
^{*} Sales figures based on certification alone.^{^} Shipments figures based on certification alone.^{‡} Sales+streaming figures based on certification alone.

== Release history ==
Release dates and formats
Region	Date	Format	Label	Ref.
United States	May 2, 2008	Digital download	A&M Octone	
United States	May 13, 2008	Contemporary hit radio	A&M Octone	
Australia	May 22, 2008	Digital EP	A&M Octone	
France	July 15, 2008	CD	A&M Octone	
Germany	August 22, 2008	CD	A&M Octone	
