= Take a Bow (Rihanna song) =

2008 single by Rihanna

Single by Rihanna

from the album Good Girl Gone Bad: Reloaded
- Released: April 15, 2008
- Recorded: 2008
- Studio: Roc the Mic Studios (New York City), Westlake Studios (Los Angeles), Parr Street Studios (Liverpool)
- Genre: R&B
- Length: 3:48
- Label: Def Jam; SRP
- Songwriters: Mikkel S. Eriksen; Tor Erik Hermansen; Shaffer Smith
- Producers: StarGate; Ne-Yo

Rihanna singles chronology
| "Don't Stop the Music" (2007) | "Take a Bow" (2008) | "If I Never See Your Face Again" (2008) |

Music video
- "Take a Bow" on YouTube

"Take a Bow" is a song recorded by the Barbadian singer Rihanna for Good Girl Gone Bad: Reloaded (2008), the re-release of her third album Good Girl Gone Bad (2007). The song was written and produced by Tor Erik Hermansen, Mikkel Eriksen, and Shaffer Smith under their stage names StarGate and Ne-Yo. "Take a Bow" was released as the first single on April 15, 2008 by Def Jam Recordings, from the re-release and the fifth single overall from the two releases. It is a R&B ballad with lyrics about how female protagonist expresses disinterest in rekindling her relationship with a dishonorable and unfaithful ex-boyfriend. Critical reception of "Take a Bow" was mixed, with some critics praising the song's lyrics and powerful balladry, while others criticized StarGate's production as unoriginal.

"Take a Bow" peaked at the top of the Billboard Hot 100, becoming Rihanna's third song to do so. "Take a Bow" also peaked at the top of the Hot R&B/Hip-Hop Songs chart and US Pop Songs chart, and has been certified sextuple platinum by the Recording Industry Association of America. Outside of the United States, "Take a Bow" topped the charts in Canada, Denmark, Ireland, Slovakia, and the UK Singles Chart, and peaked within the top ten of the charts in Australia, Austria, Germany, New Zealand, Norway, Portugal, and Switzerland. Its accompanying music video was directed by Anthony Mandler and presents Rihanna as the female protagonist who leaves her boyfriend because of his infidelity. Rihanna included the song on the set lists of the Good Girl Gone Bad Tour (2008–09), Last Girl on Earth (2010–11), Loud Tour (2011) and Diamonds World Tour (2013).

== Background and composition ==
'Take a Bow'
A 22-second sample of "Take a Bow".

"Take a Bow" was written and produced by StarGate and Ne-Yo. The song premiered on March 14, 2008, on the KIIS-FM radio show On Air with Ryan Seacrest. "Take a Bow" was released as the fifth overall single from Good Girl Gone Bad, but the first from the re-release of the album, entitled Good Girl Gone Bad: Reloaded. "Take a Bow" was made available to purchase in media outlets, via Def Jam Recordings' website, on the same day as its radio premiere in the United States later being made available to download via iTunes on May 6, 2008. The song is written in the key of E major and is set in simple time with a metronome of 82 beats per minute. Rihanna's vocal range in the song spans from the low note of E_{3} to the high note of C♯_{5}. Musically, it is an R&B song that also incorporates elements of pop music, whilst lyrically, "Take a Bow" tells of how the female protagonist expresses disinterest in rekindling her relationship with a dishonorable and unfaithful ex-boyfriend.

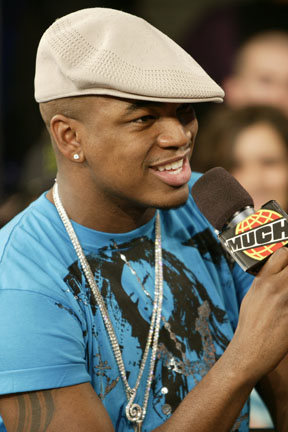
R&B singer Ne-Yo entirely wrote the lyrics to the song.

== Critical reception ==
"Take a Bow" received mixed reviews from music critics. Upon the song's release as an official single, Nick Levine of Digital Spy commented its choice for the promotion of Good Girl Gone Bad: Reloaded, writing that the singer could have chosen "Breakin' Dishes" which served as a promotional single for Good Girl Gone Bad and charted at number four on the US Hot Dance Club Songs chart in February 2008—but had opted for "Take a Bow" due to it being new and more likely to find a receptive audience. Levine continued in his review to write that although the ballad succeeds in its mission of telling of a failed relationship, he noted that the song was not at the same level as the singer's previous single, "Don't Stop the Music" (2007). Levine cited that his reason for this was that "'Take a Bow' does what it sets out to do very well, but it's an underwhelming follow-up to the dancefloor rush of 'Don't Stop The Music'". Levine also commented on the song with regard to the other new songs included on the re-release, "Disturbia" and "If I Never See Your Face Again" (a collaboration with Maroon 5), as part of his review of Good Girl Gone Bad: Reloaded, writing that "Take a Bow" is inferior to the former, but superior to the latter. Natalie Zfat of Rolling Stone gave it three and a half out of five stars.

== Chart performance ==
=== North America ===
In the United States, the song leaped 52 positions from number 53 to number one on the US Billboard Hot 100 chart on May 14, 2008, with digital download sales of 267,000 copies, which prompted the song to debut at number one on the US Hot Digital Songs chart. With "Take a Bow" jumping fifty-two positions to number one, this marked the second largest leap to number one in the history of the chart as of May 2008, second only to Maroon 5's "Makes Me Wonder", which leaped from number 64 to number one in May 2007. Additionally, at the time of release, Rihanna held two of the top three opening week download tallies, with "Take a Bow" selling 267,000 copies, the lead single from Good Girl Gone Bad "Umbrella" (featuring Jay-Z) selling 277,000 copies in May 2007, which held the record for having the largest opening digital sales tally, until Mariah Carey's "Touch My Body" opened with sales of 286,000 copies in April 2008. The song became Rihanna's third number one single on the Hot 100, after "SOS" and "Umbrella". "Take a Bow" stayed on the Hot 100 chart for 27 weeks, and also peaked at number one on the US Hot R&B/Hip-Hop Songs, Mainstream Top 40 and Radio Songs charts, respectively. However, the song was less successful on the US Hot Dance Club Songs and Adult Contemporary charts, peaking at numbers 14 and 21, respectively. The song has been certified quadruple platinum by the Recording Industry Association of America and has sold 3 million copies in the United States as of June 2015. It also ranked at number 3 on Billboard's Songs of Summer 2008. In Canada, the song leaped 69 positions from number 70 to number one on May 24, 2008, becoming the largest jump to number one in the history of the chart at the time.

=== Oceania and Europe ===
In Australia, "Take a Bow" debuted on the Australian Singles Chart at number 30 on May 15, 2008, and jumped to number 13 the following week. The song peaked at number three in its eighth week on the chart, after having spent four weeks fluctuating in the top ten. In total the song spent 11 weeks in the top ten and 22 weeks on the chart. "Take a Bow" has since been certified platinum by the Australian Recording Industry Association, denoting shipments of over 70,000 copies. In New Zealand, the song debuted on the New Zealand Singles Chart at number four on May 5, 2008, and peaked at number two for five non-consecutive weeks. In total, the song spent 10 weeks inside the top five and 15 weeks in total on the chart.

In the United Kingdom, "Take a Bow" debuted at number two on the UK Singles Chart on May 24, 2008, behind The Ting Tings "That's Not My Name". The following week, the two songs switched positions, with "Take a Bow" ascending to number one and "That's Not My Name" descending to number two; "Take a Bow" spent a total of two weeks atop the chart. On November 12, 2010, the song was certified Gold by the British Phonographic Industry, denoting shipments of over 400,000 copies. As of June 2017, it has sold over 510,000 copies in the UK.

In Denmark, the song debuted at number 13 on the Danish Singles Chart on June 6, 2008, and peaked at number one in its third week. After fluctuating in the top ten for three weeks, the song ascended to number two in its seventh and eighth weeks, and went on to stay in the top ten for a further five weeks. "Take a Bow" spent 12 weeks in the top ten and 20 weeks on the chart in total. In Norway, the song debuted at number eight on the Norwegian Singles Chart and peaked at number five the following week. "Take a Bow" stayed in the top ten for four weeks and spent six weeks on the chart in total. In Austria, the song debuted at number 16 on the Austrian Singles Chart on June 6, 2008, and peaked at number six in its fourth week on the chart for six non-consecutive weeks. "Take a Bow" spent 10 weeks inside the top ten and a 25 weeks on the chart in total. In Switzerland, the song debuted at number 29 on the Swiss Singles Chart on May 18, 2008, and peaked at number seven for one week. "Take a Bow" spent a total of 29 weeks on the chart. Elsewhere in Europe, however, the song did not experience the same degree of success. "Take a Bow" peaked at numbers 10, 12 and 12 in The Netherlands, France and Sweden.

== Music video ==
The music video was directed by Anthony Mandler, who had previously directed Rihanna videos for "Hate That I Love You" and "Shut Up and Drive". The video was shot in Venice, Los Angeles on April 3, 2008. The video begins with Rihanna standing in front of a black backdrop for the opening of the song. As the first verse starts, the scene is intercut with another of Rihanna looking out the window at her boyfriend and standing behind the front door as he approaches and asks to come in. As Rihanna walks way from the door singing the lyrics "Don't tell me you're sorry cos you're not", the viewer realizes that her boyfriend has perhaps done something wrong and been unfaithful. During the first chorus and second verse, Rihanna is shown in a different outfit, this time sitting in a silver Porsche in a garage. As Rihanna pulls out of the garage and onto the street, her ex-boyfriend walks alongside the car as she drives and begs her to forgive him; she pulls away. For the bridge, Rihanna is shown sitting on a bed as well as in front of the black backdrops as she reads a text message from her ex-boyfriend, who asks to meet her. During the last chorus, Rihanna appears in a different outfit and walks into a lounge, where she puts some clothes on a table and then sits on a sofa. As her ex-boyfriend walks in, the singer gets up and walks over to the clothes, where she withdraws some matches and strikes one, dropping it on what is made aware to be some of her ex-boyfriend's clothes. As the song comes to and end, Rihanna walks out of the room whilst he tries to put out the fire.

Erika Brooks Adickman of Idolator commented that Rihanna had once again changed her hair style and was wearing a red jacket which looked similar to the one Paula DeAnda's video "Walk Away (Remember Me)". Adickman continued to compare the content of the video to Flo Rida's "Low", writing that it was her first music video to contain an in-depth plot.

== Live performances ==
To promote Rihanna's fourth studio album, Rated R (2009) in the United Kingdom, Rihanna performed "Take a Bow" at the launch of the Nokia X6-00 smartphone at Brixton Academy in London. Other songs on the set list were "Russian Roulette" and "Wait Your Turn" from Rated R, and "Don't Stop the Music", "Disturbia", and with Jay-Z, "Umbrella" from Good Girl Gone Bad. During the promotion of Rated R, Rihanna also recorded video performances of her songs for "AOL Music Sessions"; these videos were made available to watch on AOL's website on February 23, 2010. The set included "Take a Bow", as well as "Russian Roulette, "Hard", "Rude Boy" and a stripped down version of "Disturbia". "Take a Bow" has been included on four of Rihanna's arena tours: the Good Girl Gone Bad Tour, Last Girl on Earth, Loud Tour and Diamonds World Tour. The song was featured in the encore section of the Good Girl Gone Bad Tour, along with "Umbrella". For the Last Girl on Earth and Loud Tours, the song was featured as the last to be performed before the encore section. A minimal version of the song was also included on her Diamonds World Tour during the fourth act.

== Track listing ==
- CD single
1. "Take a Bow" — 3:50
2. "Don't Stop the Music" (Solitaire's More Drama Remix) — 8:05
- Enhanced CD single
1. "Take a Bow" (Album Version) — 3:52
2. "Don't Stop the Music" (Solitaire's More Drama Remix) — 8:07
3. "Take a Bow" (Instrumental) — 3:53
4. "Take a Bow" (Video)
- 12-inch picture disc
1. "Take a Bow" (Album Version) — 3:50
2. "Don't Stop the Music" (Solitaire's More Drama Remix) — 8:05
3. "Take a Bow" (Album Version) — 3:50
4. "Don't Stop the Music" (Solitaire's More Drama Remix) — 8:05
- Digital download (Remixes)
1. "Take a Bow" (Seamus Haji & Paul Emanuel Club) — 8:34
2. "Take a Bow" (Tony Moran & Warren Riggs Encore Club) — 9:17
3. "Take a Bow" (Groove Junkies MoHo Club) — 7:21
4. "Take a Bow" (Subkulcha Club) — 6:16
5. "Take a Bow" (Groove Junkies MoHo Dub) — 6:41

== Credits and personnel ==
Credits adapted from the liner notes of Good Girl Gone Bad:Reloaded.

- Robyn "Rihanna" Fenty – Vocals
- Mikkel S. Eriksen, Tor Erik Hermansen, Shaffer Smith – Songwriting
- Stargate, Ne-Yo – Production
- Mikkel S. Eriksen – Vocal production
- Phil Tan – Mixing
- Josh Houghkirk – Assistant mixer
- Stargate – Instrumentation

== Charts ==
=== Weekly charts ===
Weekly chart performance
| Chart (2008) | Peak position |
|---|---|
| Australia (ARIA) | 3 |
| Austria (Ö3 Austria Top 40) | 6 |
| Belgium (Ultratop 50 Flanders) | 13 |
| Belgium (Ultratop 50 Wallonia) | 15 |
| Canada (Canadian Hot 100) | 1 |
| Czech Republic Airplay (ČNS IFPI) | 15 |
| Denmark (Tracklisten) | 1 |
| Europe (European Hot 100 Singles) | 3 |
| Finland (Suomen virallinen lista) | 17 |
| France (SNEP) | 12 |
| Germany (GfK) | 6 |
| Hungary (Rádiós Top 40) | 35 |
| Hungary (Dance Top 40) | 40 |
| Ireland (IRMA) | 1 |
| Netherlands (Dutch Top 40) | 3 |
| Netherlands (Single Top 100) | 10 |
| New Zealand (RIANZ) | 2 |
| Norway (VG-lista) | 5 |
| Portugal (Billboard) | 6 |
| Scottish Singles Sales (Official Charts) | 1 |
| Slovakia Airplay (ČNS IFPI) | 1 |
| Sweden (Sverigetopplistan) | 12 |
| Switzerland (Schweizer Hitparade) | 7 |
| UK Singles (OCC) | 1 |
| UK Hip Hop/R&B (Official Charts) | 1 |
| US Billboard Hot 100 | 1 |
| US Adult Contemporary (Billboard) | 21 |
| US Adult Pop Airplay (Billboard) | 24 |
| US Dance Airplay (Billboard) | 7 |
| US Dance Club Songs (Billboard) | 14 |
| US Hot R&B/Hip-Hop Songs (Billboard) | 1 |
| US Pop Airplay (Billboard) | 1 |
| US Rhythmic Airplay (Billboard) | 7 |

| Chart (2012) | Peak position |
|---|---|
| South Korea International Singles (Gaon) | 120 |

=== Monthly charts ===
Monthly chart performance
| Chart (2009) | Peak position |
|---|---|
| Brazil (Brasil Hot 100 Airplay) | 17 |
| Brazil (Brasil Hot Pop Songs) | 9 |

=== Year-end charts ===
Year-end chart performance
| Chart (2008) | Position |
|---|---|
| Australia (ARIA) | 25 |
| Austria (Ö3 Austria Top 40) | 21 |
| Belgium (Ultratop 50 Flanders) | 61 |
| Brazil (Crowley) | 19 |
| Canada (Canadian Hot 100) | 17 |
| Canada CHR/Top 40 (Billboard) | 13 |
| Europe (European Hot 100 Singles) | 23 |
| France (SNEP) | 62 |
| Germany (Media Control GfK) | 35 |
| Ireland (IRMA) | 8 |
| Netherlands (Dutch Top 40) | 26 |
| Netherlands (Single Top 100) | 50 |
| New Zealand (RIANZ) | 16 |
| Sweden (Sverigetopplistan) | 74 |
| Switzerland (Schweizer Hitparade) | 36 |
| UK Singles (OCC) | 20 |
| US Billboard Hot 100 | 12 |
| US Hot R&B/Hip-Hop Songs (Billboard) | 28 |
| US Mainstream Top 40 (Billboard) | 6 |
| US Rhythmic Airplay (Billboard) | 29 |

| Chart (2010) | Position |
|---|---|
| South Korea International Singles (Gaon) | 18 |

| Chart (2011) | Position |
|---|---|
| South Korea International Singles (Gaon) | 48 |

| Chart (2013) | Position |
|---|---|
| South Korea International Singles (Gaon) | 46 |

== Certifications and sales ==
Certifications and sales
| Region | Certification | Certified units/sales |
|---|---|---|
| Australia (ARIA) | 7× Platinum | 490,000^{‡} |
| Brazil (Pro-Música Brasil) | Diamond | 250,000^{‡} |
| Denmark (IFPI Danmark) | 2× Platinum | 180,000^{‡} |
| Germany (BVMI) | Gold | 150,000^{‡} |
| Japan (RIAJ) | Gold | 100,000^{*} |
| New Zealand (RMNZ) | 4× Platinum | 120,000^{‡} |
| South Korea (Gaon Chart) | — | 1,335,866 |
| United Kingdom (BPI) | 2× Platinum | 1,200,000^{‡} |
| United States (RIAA) Mastertone | Platinum | 1,000,000^{*} |
| United States (RIAA) | 6× Platinum | 6,000,000^{‡} |
^{*} Sales figures based on certification alone.^{‡} Sales+streaming figures based on certification alone.

== Release history ==
Release dates and formats
| Region | Date | Format(s) | Label | Ref. |
|---|---|---|---|---|
| United States | April 15, 2008 | Contemporary hit radio; rhythmic contemporary radio | Def Jam | |
| Japan | April 16, 2008 | Digital download; ringtone | Def Jam | |
| United States | May 20, 2008 | Digital download (Remixes) | Def Jam | |
| Germany | June 6, 2008 | CD | Def Jam | |
| France | July 21, 2008 | CD | Def Jam | |

== See also ==
- List of number-one R&B/hip-hop songs of 2008 (U.S.)
- Take a Bow (Madonna song)
