= Rob. A! =

American singer-songwriter

- Born: Robert Lamont Allen; June 2, 1985
- Origin: New Jersey, United States
- Died: July 29, 2024 (aged 39)
- Genres: Pop, dance, R&B
- Occupations: Singer, songwriter, musician
- Instruments: Vocals, piano, synths
- Years active: 2006–2024
- Label: Ultra Records 2009–present
- Website: www.robauniverse.com

Rob. A! (born Robert Lamont Allen June 2, 1985 – July 29, 2024) was an American singer, songwriter, and record producer. He was popular for his freestyle songwriting approach that gave him the nickname "The Jay-Z of R&B".

He got his break as a songwriter in early 2008 when he collaborated with Andre Merritt, Chris Brown and Brian Kennedy. The collaboration climbed him to a multi-platinum songwriter status with two No. 1 records back to back in June 2009.

By the end of the summer of 2009, he was signed a co-publishing deal with Sony/ATV Music Publishing courtesy of the VP/Urban A&R Juan Madrid.

Rob Allen, who was also referred to by Twitter followers as King Rebel, has started the movement called the Robellion. He explains: "It is my effort to reset the tone of the music business. I want to pave a way for true talent and creativity to be noticed. Music has now become packaged and mechanical with the exception of the veterans who have total freedom in their art. The variety of unique voices and character is missing and I'm going to bring that back." Behind the Robellion was his own team, called Team Rebel. He collaborated with producer Donameche "Don-City" Jackson. Together they have made leaked songs "Pressin' Buttons," "Curves," "Wifey Material," "Beat It Up" and "Kill Cupid."

== Songwriting credits ==
=== 2008 ===
Rihanna — Disturbia

- 01. "Disturbia" (co-written by Rob. A!, Chris Brown, Andre Merritt and Brian Kennedy)

Chris Brown — Exclusive

- 18. "Forever" (co-written by Rob. A!, Chris Brown, Andre Merritt and Polow da Don)

Other Songs written by Rob.A

[Chris Brown]

- Forever
- Dreamer
- Erased [Andre Merritt]
- Electric Guitar
- Hologram [Andre Merritt]
- Golden Girl
- Froze
- Trapped in a Dream
- Without You
- Spirit
- Powerful
- You Need
- Famous Girl [Graffiti]
- What i Do [Graffiti]
- I need This [Graffiti]
- Glow in The Dark [In My Zone]
- Seen her naked [In My Zone 2]
- Captive
- Nasty Girl

Others

Omarion "Comfort", J. Holiday "Heart Attack", Kelly Rowland "On & On", R. Kelly "I Love the Dj", Jaicko "Two Piece", Sugababes "Sweet and Amazing", Mario "Need to Be There"

== Awards ==
=== Teen Choice Awards ===
Year	Nominee / work	Award	Result
2008	Forever	Teen Choice Awards: Best R&B Track	Won

=== People's Choice Award ===
Year	Nominee / work	Award	Result
2009	Disturbia	People's Choice Award: Favorite Pop Song	Nominated

=== Grammy Award ===
Year	Nominee / work	Award	Result
2009	Disturbia	Grammy Award: Best Dance Recording	Nominated

=== NRJ Music Award ===
Year	Nominee / work	Award	Result
2009	Disturbia	NRJ Music Award: International Song of the Year	Won

=== MTV Awards ===
Year	Nominee / work	Award	Result
2008	Forever	MTV Video Music Awards: Best Video of the Year	Nominated
2009	Forever	MTV Australia Awards for Best Moves	Nominated

=== BMI Pop Award ===
Year	Nominee / work	Award	Result
2009	Forever	BMI Pop Award	Won
2010	Disturbia	BMI Pop Award	Won
