= Anthony Mandler =

American director

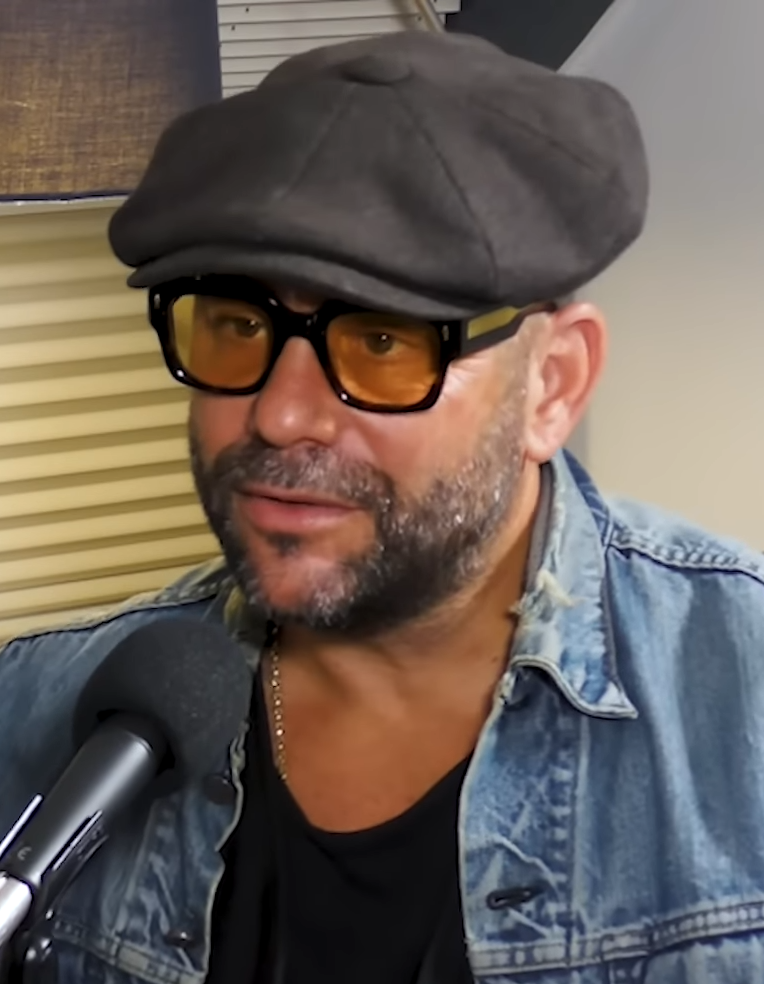
- Mandler in 2022
- Born: Los Angeles, California, U.S.
- Occupations: Director, photographer
- Years active: 1998–present
- Spouse: Denise Vasi (m. 2013)
- Children: 2
- Website: BlackHandCinema

Anthony Mandler is an American film, television, and music video director and photographer.

As a music video director, his most notable and frequent collaborator is Rihanna. The two have worked on sixteen music videos together throughout her career, beginning with "Unfaithful" in 2006 and most recently "Diamonds" in 2012.

He has also written and directed music videos for the Spice Girls, Jay Z, Beyoncé, Eminem, Usher, Shakira, Taylor Swift, The Killers, Selena Gomez, Justin Bieber, Christina Aguilera, Nelly Furtado, 50 Cent, Ne-Yo, Nicki Minaj, Drake, Snoop Dogg, Lenny Kravitz, Cheryl Cole, M.I.A., Mary J. Blige, Fun, and Lana Del Rey.

== Career ==
Beginning his career as a photographer, Mandler's work has been featured on the covers of magazines such as Entertainment Weekly, GQ, Esquire, Men's Health, and ESPN The Magazine. His celebrity portraits include David Beckham, Colin Farrell, James Franco, Heath Ledger, Ryan Phillippe, Eva Mendes, LeBron James, Taylor Lautner, Andrew Garfield, Kiefer Sutherland and Katie Holmes. For commercials, he has worked with clients such as Nike, Inc., Motorola, Duracell and Cîroc.

In film, Mandler was set to make his feature film directorial debut with the film Tokyo Vice based on the Jake Adelstein book of the same name. J. T. Rogers would be providing the screenplay, with Daniel Radcliffe starring in the lead role. Mandler ultimately made his debut with the 2018 film Monster.

== Personal life ==
Mandler was born in Los Angeles, California. He married actress Denise Vasi in October 2013 and together they have two children, Lennox Mae, and Dries.

He is Jewish.

== Filmography ==
- Monster (2018)
- Happiness Continues (2020)
- Surrounded (2023)

== Videography ==
=== 2000 ===
- 8Ball & MJG — "Pimp Hard"
- 4th Avenue Jones — "Respect"

=== 2001 ===
- Black Eyed Peas feat. Chali 2na — "Get Original"
- Laura Dawn — "I Would"

=== 2003 ===
- Maria — "I Give You Take"

=== 2005 ===
- Snoop Dogg — "Ups & Downs/Bang Out"
- M.I.A. — "Bucky Done Gun"
- Common — "Testify"
- Kem — "Find Your Way"
- 50 Cent — "Hustler's Ambition"
- Sean Paul — "Ever Blazin'"
- Eminem — "When I'm Gone"
- DPGC — "Real Soon"

=== 2006 ===
- Nelly Furtado — "Maneater"
- Rihanna — "Unfaithful"
- Ne-Yo — "Sexy Love"
- Sleepy Brown feat. Pharrell & Big Boi — "Margarita"
- The Killers — "When You Were Young"
- Rihanna — "We Ride"
- Beyoncé — "Irreplaceable"
- Omarion — '"Ice Box"
- Jay Z feat. Chrisette Michele — "Lost One"

=== 2007 ===
- Duran Duran — "Falling Down"
- Beyoncé — "Get Me Bodied"
- Snoop Dogg feat. Nate Dogg — "Boss' Life"
- Fergie — "Big Girls Don't Cry"
- Rihanna — "Shut Up and Drive"
- Enrique Iglesias — "Somebody's Me"
- Rihanna feat. Ne-Yo — "Hate That I Love You"
- The Killers — "Tranquilize"
- Spice Girls — "Headlines (Friendship Never Ends)"
- Rihanna — "Don't Stop The Music"

=== 2008 ===
- OneRepublic — "Stop and Stare"
- Rihanna — "Take a Bow"
- OneRepublic — "Say (All I Need)"
- Bayje — "Find a Way"
- Rihanna — "Disturbia" (co-directed with Rihanna)
- Maroon 5 feat. Rihanna — "If I Never See Your Face Again"
- T.I. feat. Rihanna — "Live Your Life"
- Akon — "Right Now (Na Na Na)"
- Enrique Iglesias — "Away"
- Rihanna — "Rehab"
- Wyclef Jean feat. will.i.am, Imposs, Jimmy O & Melissa Jiménez — "Let Me Touch Your Button"

=== 2009 ===
- John Legend — "Everybody Knows"
- Utada — "Come Back To Me"
- Robin Thicke — "Dreamworld"
- Daniel Merriweather — "Red"
- The Killers — "A Dustland Fairytale"
- Melanie Fiona — "Give It to Me Right"
- Eminem — "Beautiful"
- Jay Z — "D.O.A. (Death of Auto-Tune)"
- Daniel Merriweather — "Impossible"
- Maxwell — "Bad Habits"
- Jay Z feat. Rihanna & Kanye West — "Run This Town"
- Mary J. Blige feat. Drake — "The One"
- Mary J. Blige — "Stronger"
- Mary J. Blige — "I Am"
- Ryan Leslie — "You're Not My Girl"
- Amerie — "Heard 'Em All"
- John Mayer — "Who Says"
- Rihanna — "Russian Roulette"
- Rihanna — "Wait Your Turn"
- Jay-Z feat. Mr Hudson — "Young Forever"

=== 2010 ===
- John Mayer — "Heartbreak Warfare"
- Nikki & Rich — "Next Best Thing" & "Same Kind of Man"
- Usher feat. will.i.am — "OMG"
- Drake — "Over"
- Drake — "Find Your Love"
- Muse — "Neutron Star Collision (Love Is Forever)"
- Rihanna — "Te Amo"
- Christina Aguilera — "You Lost Me"
- Usher — "There Goes My Baby"
- Drake feat. Lil Wayne — "Miss Me"
- Drake feat. T.I. & Swizz Beatz — "Fancy" (unreleased)
- Trey Songz feat. Nicki Minaj — "Bottoms Up"
- Trey Songz — "Can't Be Friends"
- Rihanna — "Only Girl (In the World)"

=== 2011 ===
- Romeo Santos — "Promise" (featuring Usher)
- Jennifer Hudson — "Where You At"
- Rihanna — "California King Bed", "Man Down"
- Tyler, the Creator — "She" (featuring Frank Ocean; as co-producer)

=== 2012 ===
- Nicki Minaj — "Starships"
- Shakira — "Addicted to You", "Dare (La La La)" (shot in 2012, released in 2014)
- Cheryl — "Call My Name", "Under the Sun"
- Fun — "Some Nights", "Carry On"
- Lana Del Rey — "National Anthem", "Ride"
- Justin Bieber — "As Long as You Love Me" (featuring Big Sean)
- Muse — "Madness"
- Rihanna — "Diamonds"
- Taylor Swift — "I Knew You Were Trouble"

=== 2013 ===
- Taylor Swift — "22"
- Selena Gomez — "Come & Get It"
- The Weeknd — "Belong to the World"
- Jay-Z — "Holy Grail" (featuring Justin Timberlake)
- Lana Del Rey — Tropico (short film)

=== 2014 ===
- Jennifer Hudson — "I Can't Describe (The Way I Feel)" (featuring T.I.)
- Jennifer Lopez — "First Love"
- Lenny Kravitz — "The Chamber"
- Shakira — "Dare (La La La)"

=== 2015 ===
- Nate Ruess — "Nothing Without Love"

=== 2016 ===
- Drake — "Please Forgive Me"

=== 2018 ===
- Sugarland — "Babe" (featuring Taylor Swift)
- Shawn Mendes, Khalid — "Youth"

=== 2019 ===
- Jonas Brothers — "Sucker"
- Jonas Brothers — "Cool"
- SZA, The Weeknd, Travis Scott — "Power Is Power"
- Jonas Brothers — "Only Human"

=== 2021 ===
- Nick Jonas — "Spaceman"

=== 2023 ===
- Jonas Brothers — "Waffle House"

=== 2024 ===
- Lenny Kravitz — "Paralyzed"

=== 2025 ===
- Joe Jonas - "Heart By Heart"

=== 2026 ===
- Nick Jonas — "Gut Punch"
