= Rihanna singles discography =

Singles recorded by Barbadian singer

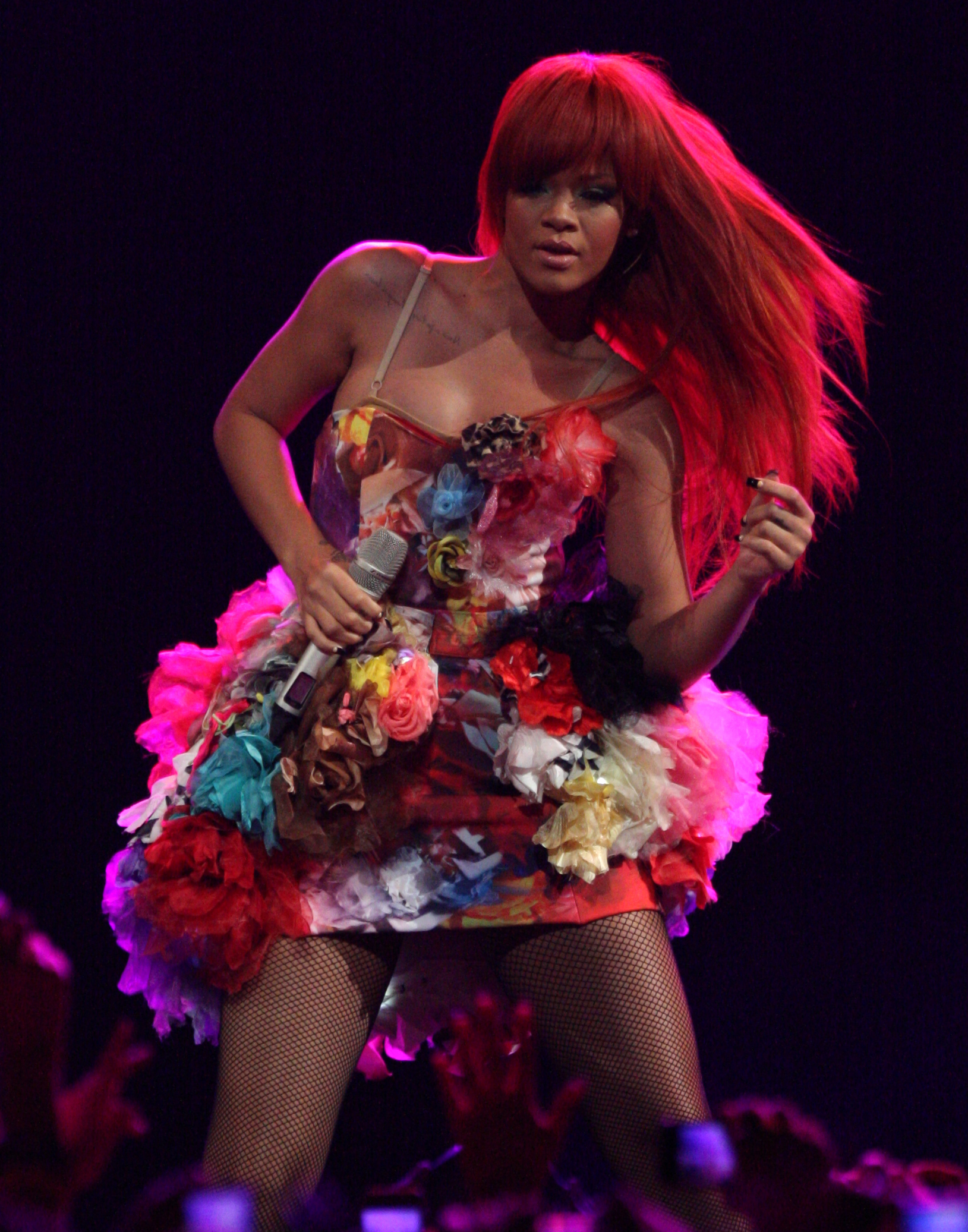
- Rihanna performing at the Last Girl on Earth tour in 2011
- As lead artist: 53
- As featured artist: 17
- Charity singles: 2
- Promotional singles: 5
- Other charted songs: 32

Barbadian singer Rihanna has released 53 singles as lead artist, 17 singles as a featured artist, 2 charity singles, and 5 promotional singles. On the United States Billboard Hot 100, she has amassed 14 number-one songs and 32 top-ten songs, 60 weeks at number one, and more weeks in the top ten (360) than any other artist. As of April 2026, the Recording Industry Association of America (RIAA) recognized Rihanna as the top-selling female digital singles artist, with over 200 million certified units based on solo credits. Eight of her singles have been certified Diamond by the RIAA, making her the female artist with the most Diamond-certified singles.

Rihanna's first chart entry, "Pon de Replay"—the lead single from her debut album Music of the Sun (2005)—peaked at number two in the United States and reached the top ten on the charts of many European countries. From 2006 to 2012, she released one studio album each year (except in 2008), from A Girl like Me to Unapologetic. Each album produced at least one number-one single in the United States. The singles also reached the top five on the charts of Australasia and many European countries. The string of US number-one singles as lead artist includes "SOS" (A Girl like Me, 2006); "Umbrella", "Take a Bow", and "Disturbia" (Good Girl Gone Bad, 2007–2008); (Note: "Take a Bow" and "Disturbia" are singles from the reissue of Good Girl Gone Bad, Good Girl Gone Bad: Reloaded. Billboard determines them as singles from Good Girl Gone Bad in their chart data.) "Rude Boy" (Rated R, 2009); "Only Girl (In the World)", "What's My Name?", and "S&M" (Loud, 2010); "We Found Love" (Talk That Talk, 2011); and "Diamonds" (Unapologetic, 2012). "Umbrella" spent ten weeks atop the UK Singles Chart, becoming one of the longest chart toppers in UK history.

Rihanna topped the Billboard Hot 100 with three singles as a featured artist: "Live Your Life" with T.I., and "Love the Way You Lie" and "The Monster" with Eminem. Her string of number-one singles marked milestones. With "S&M" topping the chart in April 2011, she registered the shortest time frame to have ten number-one singles (from "SOS" in May 2006) and became the youngest artist (at 23 years) to have ten number-one songs. With "We Found Love" reaching the top ten in October 2011, Rihanna scored the fastest time span to score 20 US top-ten singles (from "Pon de Replay" in June 2005). In the United Kingdom, she is the first female solo artist to have number-one singles in five consecutive years, with "Umbrella", "Take a Bow", "Run This Town" (as a featured artist on Jay-Z's single), "Only Girl (in the World)", and "What's My Name?", from 2007 to 2011.

With "Work", the lead single from her eighth studio album, Anti (2016), Rihanna scored her 14th number-one single on the Billboard Hot 100. This made Rihanna the only artist to have seven consecutive albums each score a number-one single on the Hot 100. "Work" topped the charts in Canada and France, and with 32.5 million digital units based on sales and streaming as of January 2021, became one of the best-selling digital singles of all time. With eight songs from the album reaching number one on the Billboard Hot Dance Club Songs, Rihanna claimed the record for the most number-one songs from a single album. She also scored international chart toppers as a guest vocalist on Calvin Harris's "This Is What You Came For", which reached number one in Australia, Canada and Ireland, and DJ Khaled's "Wild Thoughts", which reached number one in the United Kingdom.

== As lead artist ==
=== 2000s ===
List of singles as lead artist, with selected chart positions and certifications, showing year released and album name
| Title | Year | Peak chart positions | | | | | | | | | | Certifications | Album |
| Title | Year | US | AUS | CAN | FRA | GER | IRL | NZ | SWE | SWI | UK | Certifications | Album |
|---|---|---|---|---|---|---|---|---|---|---|---|---|---|
| "Pon de Replay" | 2005 | 2 | 6 | — (Note: The Canadian Hot 100 did not exist until 2007, and didn't chart. Same goes for IILTYW.) | 18 | 6 | 2 | 1 | 5 | 3 | 2 | RIAA: 5× Platinum; ARIA: 6× Platinum; BPI: 3× Platinum; BVMI: 3× Gold; GLF: Gold; RMNZ: 4× Platinum | Music of the Sun |
| "If It's Lovin' That You Want" | 2005 | 36 | 9 | — | — | 25 | 8 | 9 | — | 19 | 11 | RIAA: Platinum; ARIA: Platinum; BPI: Gold; RMNZ: Platinum | Music of the Sun |
| "SOS" | 2006 | 1 | 1 | 1 | 12 | 2 | 3 | 3 | 12 | 3 | 2 | RIAA: 3× Platinum; ARIA: 5× Platinum; BPI: Platinum; BVMI: Gold; GLF: Gold; RMNZ: 2× Platinum | A Girl Like Me |
| "Unfaithful" | 2006 | 6 | 2 | 1 | 7 | 2 | 2 | 4 | 6 | 1 | 2 | RIAA: 4× Platinum; ARIA: 4× Platinum; BPI: Platinum; BVMI: 3× Gold; GLF: Gold; IFPI SWI: Gold; RMNZ: Platinum | A Girl Like Me |
| "We Ride" | 2006 | — (Note: "We Ride" did not enter the US Billboard Hot 100, but peaked at number 7 on the Bubbling Under Hot 100 Singles chart.) | 24 | 40 | — | 45 | 17 | 8 | — | 42 | 17 | RIAA: Gold; ARIA: Platinum; BPI: Silver; RMNZ: Platinum | A Girl Like Me |
| "Break It Off" (featuring Sean Paul) | 2006 | 9 | — | 36 | — | — | — | — | — | — | — | RIAA: Gold | A Girl Like Me |
| "Umbrella" (featuring Jay-Z) | 2007 | 1 | 1 | 1 | 6 | 1 | 1 | 1 | 2 | 1 | 1 | RIAA: Diamond; ARIA: 15× Platinum; BPI: 4× Platinum; BVMI: 2× Platinum; GLF: 2× Platinum; IFPI SWI: Gold; RMNZ: 7× Platinum | Good Girl Gone Bad |
| "Shut Up and Drive" | 2007 | 15 | 4 | 6 | 3 | 6 | 5 | 12 | 31 | 14 | 5 | RIAA: 3× Platinum; ARIA: 4× Platinum; BPI: Platinum; BVMI: Gold; RMNZ: 2× Platinum | Good Girl Gone Bad |
| "Hate That I Love You" (featuring Ne-Yo) | 2007 | 7 | 14 | 17 | 16 | 11 | 13 | 6 | 10 | 13 | 15 | RIAA: 3× Platinum; ARIA: 4× Platinum; BPI: Platinum; BVMI: Gold; RMNZ: 2× Platinum | Good Girl Gone Bad |
| "Don't Stop the Music" | 2007 | 3 | 1 | 2 | 1 | 1 | 6 | 3 | 6 | 1 | 4 | RIAA: 6× Platinum; ARIA: 12× Platinum; BPI: 3× Platinum; BVMI: 5× Gold; GLF: Platinum; RMNZ: 5× Platinum | Good Girl Gone Bad |
| "Take a Bow" | 2008 | 1 | 3 | 1 | 12 | 6 | 1 | 2 | 12 | 7 | 1 | RIAA: 6× Platinum; ARIA: 7× Platinum; BPI: 2× Platinum; BVMI: Gold; RMNZ: 4× Platinum | Good Girl Gone Bad: Reloaded |
| "Disturbia" | 2008 | 1 | 6 | 2 | 3 | 5 | 4 | 1 | 4 | 4 | 3 | RIAA: 7× Platinum; ARIA: 9× Platinum; BPI: 3× Platinum; BVMI: 3× Gold; GLF: Gold; RMNZ: 4× Platinum | Good Girl Gone Bad: Reloaded |
| "Rehab" | 2008 | 18 | 26 | 19 | 30 | 4 | 22 | 12 | 28 | 13 | 16 | RIAA: 2× Platinum; ARIA: 2× Platinum; BPI: Platinum; BVMI: Platinum; RMNZ: 2× Platinum | Good Girl Gone Bad |
| "Russian Roulette" | 2009 | 9 | 7 | 9 | 4 | 2 | 5 | 9 | 4 | 1 | 2 | RIAA: 2× Platinum; ARIA: 2× Platinum; BPI: Platinum; BVMI: Gold; GLF: Platinum; IFPI SWI: Gold; RMNZ: Gold | Rated R |
| "Hard" (featuring Jeezy) | 2009 | 8 | 51 | 9 | — | — | 33 | 15 | 26 | — | 42 | RIAA: 2× Platinum; ARIA: Gold; BPI: Silver | Rated R |
| "Wait Your Turn" | 2009 | — (Note: "Wait Your Turn" did not enter the Billboard Hot 100, but peaked at number 10 on the Bubbling Under Hot 100 Singles chart.) | 82 | — | — | — | 32 | — | — | — | 45 | | Rated R |
"—" denotes a recording that did not chart or was not released in that territory.

=== 2010s ===
List of singles as lead artist, with selected chart positions and certifications, showing year released and album name
| Title | Year | Peak chart positions | | | | | | | | | | Certifications | Album |
| Title | Year | US | AUS | CAN | FRA | GER | IRL | NZ | SWE | SWI | UK | Certifications | Album |
|---|---|---|---|---|---|---|---|---|---|---|---|---|---|
| "Rude Boy" | 2010 | 1 | 1 | 7 | 8 | 4 | 3 | 3 | 11 | 5 | 2 | RIAA: 5× Platinum; ARIA: 8× Platinum; BPI: 3× Platinum; BVMI: Gold; IFPI SWI: Gold; RMNZ: 3× Platinum | Rated R |
| "Te Amo" | 2010 | — | 22 | 66 | 17 | 11 | 16 | — | 48 | 9 | 14 | RIAA: Gold; ARIA: 2× Platinum; BPI: Platinum; BVMI: Gold; IFPI SWI: Gold; RMNZ: Platinum | Rated R |
| "Rockstar 101" (featuring Slash) | 2010 | 64 | 24 | — | — | — | — | — | — | — | — | RIAA: Platinum; ARIA: Gold | Rated R |
| "Only Girl (In the World)" | 2010 | 1 | 1 | 1 | 2 | 2 | 1 | 1 | 2 | 2 | 1 | RIAA: 7× Platinum; ARIA: 14× Platinum; BPI: 4× Platinum; BVMI: 5× Gold; GLF: 4× Platinum; IFPI SWI: 2× Platinum; RMNZ: 5× Platinum | Loud |
| "What's My Name?" (featuring Drake) | 2010 | 1 | 18 | 5 | 16 | 12 | 3 | 3 | 20 | 13 | 1 | RIAA: 6× Platinum; ARIA: 5× Platinum; BPI: 3× Platinum; BVMI: Gold; GLF: Platinum; IFPI SWI: Gold; RMNZ: 3× Platinum | Loud |
| "Raining Men" (featuring Nicki Minaj) | 2010 | — (Note: "Raining Men" did not enter the Billboard Hot 100, but peaked at number 11 on the Bubbling Under Hot 100 Singles chart.) | — | — | — | — | — | — | — | — | 142 | | Loud |
| "S&M" (solo or featuring Britney Spears) | 2011 | 1 | 1 | 1 | 3 | 2 | 3 | 2 | 2 | 2 | 3 | RIAA: 6× Platinum; ARIA: 12× Platinum; BPI: 4× Platinum; BVMI: 2× Platinum; GLF: 3× Platinum; IFPI SWI: Platinum; RMNZ: 5× Platinum | Loud |
| "California King Bed" | 2011 | 37 | 4 | 20 | 30 | 8 | 11 | 4 | 31 | 10 | 8 | RIAA: 2× Platinum; ARIA: 4× Platinum; BPI: Platinum; BVMI: Gold; GLF: Platinum; IFPI SWI: Gold; RMNZ: Gold | Loud |
| "Man Down" | 2011 | 59 | — | 63 | 1 | — | — | — | 31 | 9 | 54 | RIAA: 2× Platinum; ARIA: Platinum; BPI: Platinum; GLF: 2× Platinum; IFPI SWI: Gold; RMNZ: Platinum | Loud |
| "Cheers (Drink to That)" | 2011 | 7 | 6 | 6 | 64 | — | 16 | 5 | — | 66 | 15 | RIAA: 2× Platinum; ARIA: 5× Platinum; BPI: Gold; GLF: Gold; RMNZ: Platinum | Loud |
| "We Found Love" (featuring Calvin Harris) | 2011 | 1 | 2 | 1 | 1 | 1 | 1 | 1 | 1 | 1 | 1 | RIAA: 11× Platinum; ARIA: 17× Platinum; BPI: 6× Platinum; BVMI: 3× Platinum; GLF: 6× Platinum; IFPI SWI: 2× Platinum; RMNZ: 8× Platinum | Talk That Talk |
| "You da One" | 2011 | 14 | 26 | 12 | 23 | — | 12 | 10 | 17 | 36 | 16 | RIAA: 4× Platinum; ARIA: 3× Platinum; BPI: Gold; GLF: Gold; RMNZ: 2× Platinum | Talk That Talk |
| "Talk That Talk" (featuring Jay-Z) | 2012 | 31 | 28 | 30 | 24 | — | 22 | 37 | 41 | 11 | 25 | RIAA: 2× Platinum; ARIA: Gold; BPI: Gold; GLF: Gold; RMNZ: Platinum | Talk That Talk |
| "Princess of China" (with Coldplay) | 2012 | 20 | 16 | 17 | 24 | 41 | 5 | 8 | — | 20 | 4 | ARIA: Platinum; BPI: 2× Platinum; RMNZ: Gold | Mylo Xyloto |
| "Birthday Cake" (Remix) (featuring Chris Brown) | 2012 | 24 | — | — | — | — | — | — | — | — | — | | Non-album single |
| "Where Have You Been" | 2012 | 5 | 6 | 5 | 2 | 17 | 8 | 4 | 27 | 15 | 6 | RIAA: 6× Platinum; ARIA: 7× Platinum; BPI: 2× Platinum; BVMI: Platinum; GLF: 2× Platinum; RMNZ: 3× Platinum | Talk That Talk |
| "Cockiness (Love It)" (Remix) (featuring ASAP Rocky) | 2012 | — (Note: "Cockiness (Love It) Remix" did not enter the Billboard Hot 100, but peaked at number 2 on the Bubbling Under Hot 100 Singles chart.) | — | — | — | — | — | — | — | — | — | | Non-album single |
| "Diamonds" | 2012 | 1 | 6 | 1 | 1 | 1 | 2 | 2 | 2 | 1 | 1 | RIAA: Diamond; ARIA: 13× Platinum; BPI: 4× Platinum; BVMI: 4× Platinum; GLF: 6× Platinum; IFPI SWI: 4× Platinum; MC: Gold; RMNZ: 5× Platinum | Unapologetic |
| "Stay" (featuring Mikky Ekko) | 2013 | 3 | 4 | 1 | 2 | 2 | 2 | 4 | 80 | 2 | 4 | RIAA: 12× Platinum; ARIA: 14× Platinum; BPI: 4× Platinum; BVMI: 3× Gold; RMNZ: 7× Platinum | Unapologetic |
| "Pour It Up" | 2013 | 19 | — | 49 | 92 | — | 56 | — | — | — | 43 | RIAA: 3× Platinum; ARIA: 2× Platinum; BPI: Platinum; RMNZ: 2× Platinum | Unapologetic |
| "Right Now" (featuring David Guetta) | 2013 | 50 | 39 | 32 | 31 | 43 | 52 | 54 | 25 | 32 | 36 | RIAA: Gold; ARIA: Platinum; BPI: Silver; GLF: Platinum; RMNZ: Gold | Unapologetic |
| "What Now" | 2013 | 25 | 21 | 27 | 52 | 49 | 21 | 13 | 46 | 46 | 21 | RIAA: Platinum; ARIA: 2× Platinum; BPI: Gold; RMNZ: Platinum | Unapologetic |
| "Jump" | 2014 | — | 5 | — | 153 | — | — | 10 | — | — | 150 | ARIA: 2× Platinum; RMNZ: Gold | Unapologetic |
| "FourFiveSeconds" (with Kanye West and Paul McCartney) | 2015 | 4 | 1 | 3 | 2 | 3 | 1 | 1 | 1 | 3 | 3 | RIAA: 5× Platinum; ARIA: 11× Platinum; BPI: 3× Platinum; BVMI: 3× Gold; GLF: 4× Platinum; IFPI SWI: Platinum; RMNZ: 7× Platinum; SNEP: Gold | Non-album single |
| "Towards the Sun" | 2015 | — (Note: "Towards the Sun" did not enter the Billboard Hot 100, but peaked at number 24 on the Bubbling Under Hot 100 Singles chart.) | — | — | 22 | — | — | — | — | — | 76 | ARIA: Gold | Home |
| "Bitch Better Have My Money" | 2015 | 15 | 14 | 11 | 3 | 17 | 39 | 10 | 14 | 7 | 27 | RIAA: 4× Platinum; ARIA: 4× Platinum; BPI: Platinum; BVMI: Gold; GLF: Platinum; RMNZ: 3× Platinum; SNEP: Gold | Non-album singles |
| "American Oxygen" | 2015 | 78 | 65 | 59 | 25 | 39 | 39 | — | 11 | 30 | 71 | GLF: Platinum | Non-album singles |
| "Work" (featuring Drake) | 2016 | 1 | 5 | 1 | 1 | 5 | 2 | 2 | 2 | 9 | 2 | RIAA: 11× Platinum; ARIA: 7× Platinum; BPI: 4× Platinum; BVMI: Platinum; GLF: 4× Platinum; MC: 9× Platinum; RMNZ: 5× Platinum; SNEP: Diamond | Anti |
| "Kiss It Better" | 2016 | 62 | 48 | — | 76 | — | 66 | — (Note: "Kiss It Better" did not enter the NZ Top 40 Singles Chart, but peaked at number 3 on the NZ Heatseekers chart.) | — (Note: "Kiss It Better" did not enter the Swedish Sverigetopplistan chart, but peaked at number 4 on the Swedish Heatseeker chart.) | — | 46 | RIAA: 4× Platinum; ARIA: 3× Platinum; BPI: Platinum; MC: 2× Platinum; RMNZ: 4× Platinum; SNEP: Platinum | Anti |
| "Needed Me" | 2016 | 7 | 44 | 25 | 94 | 57 | 58 | 14 | 34 | 45 | 38 | RIAA: 12× Platinum; ARIA: 7× Platinum; BPI: 3× Platinum; BVMI: Gold; GLF: 2× Platinum; MC: 7× Platinum; RMNZ: 6× Platinum; SNEP: Diamond | Anti |
| "Nothing Is Promised" (with Mike Will Made It) | 2016 | 75 | 69 | — | 25 | — | — | — (Note: "Nothing Is Promised" did not enter the NZ Top 40 Singles Chart, but peaked at number 7 on the NZ Heatseeker chart.) | — | — | 64 | RIAA: Gold | Ransom 2 |
| "Sledgehammer" | 2016 | — (Note: "Sledgehammer" did not enter the Billboard Hot 100, but peaked at number 2 on the Bubbling Under Hot 100 Singles chart.) | 69 | — | 60 | — | — | — (Note: "Sledgehammer" did not enter the NZ Top 40 Singles Chart, but peaked at number 6 on the NZ Heatseeker Singles Chart.) | — (Note: "Sledgehammer" did not enter the Swedish Sverigetopplistan chart, but peaked at number 5 on the Swedish Heatseeker chart.) | — | 69 | | Star Trek Beyond |
| "Love on the Brain" | 2016 | 5 | 100 | 22 | 12 | 21 | — | 15 | 96 | 26 | 175 | RIAA: Diamond; ARIA: 6× Platinum; BPI: 2× Platinum; BVMI: Platinum; GLF: Gold; MC: 7× Platinum; RMNZ: 7× Platinum; SNEP: Diamond | Anti |
| "Lemon" (with N.E.R.D.) | 2017 | 36 | 44 | 33 | 47 | — | 51 | 37 | — | 59 | 31 | RIAA: 3× Platinum; ARIA: Platinum; BPI: Gold; MC: 2× Platinum; RMNZ: 2× Platinum | No One Ever Really Dies |
"—" denotes a recording that did not chart or was not released in that territory.

=== 2020s ===
List of singles as lead artist, with selected chart positions and certifications, showing year released and album name
| Title | Year | Peak chart positions | | | | | | | | | | Certifications | Album |
| Title | Year | US | AUS | CAN | FRA | GER | IRL | NZ | SWE | SWI | UK | Certifications | Album |
|---|---|---|---|---|---|---|---|---|---|---|---|---|---|
| "Believe It" (with PartyNextDoor) | 2020 | 23 | 28 | 39 | 48 | 58 | 16 | 15 | 28 | 24 | 12 | RIAA: 2× Platinum; BPI: Platinum; MC: Platinum; RMNZ: 2× Platinum | Partymobile |
| "Lift Me Up" | 2022 | 2 | 5 | 3 | 3 | 9 | 3 | 3 | 11 | 1 | 3 | RIAA: Platinum; ARIA: Platinum; BPI: Gold; MC: 2× Platinum; RMNZ: Platinum; SNEP: Diamond | Black Panther: Wakanda Forever |
| "Friend of Mine" | 2025 | — (Note: "Friend of Mine" did not enter the US Billboard Hot 100, but debuted on top of the Bubbling Under Hot 100 chart.) | — | — | — | — | — | — (Note: "Friend of Mine" did not enter the NZ Top 40 Singles Chart, but peaked at number 16 on the NZ Hot Singles Chart.) | — (Note: "Friend of Mine" did not enter the Swedish Singles Chart, but peaked at number 17 on the Swedish Heatseeker chart.) | — | 72 | | Smurfs |
"—" denotes a recording that did not chart or was not released in that territory.

== As featured artist ==
List of singles as featured artist, with selected chart positions and certifications, showing year released and album name
| Title | Year | Peak chart positions | | | | | | | | | | Certifications | Album |
| Title | Year | US | AUS | CAN | FRA | GER | IRL | NZ | SWE | SWI | UK | Certifications | Album |
|---|---|---|---|---|---|---|---|---|---|---|---|---|---|
| "Roll It" (J-Status featuring Rihanna and Shontelle) | 2007 | — | — | — | — | 33 | — | — | — | 89 | — | | The Beginning |
| "If I Never See Your Face Again" (Maroon 5 featuring Rihanna) | 2008 | 51 | 11 | 12 | — | — | 16 | 21 | — | 52 | 28 | RIAA: Platinum; ARIA: Platinum; MC: Gold | It Won't Be Soon Before Long |
| "Live Your Life" (T.I. featuring Rihanna) | 2008 | 1 | 3 | 4 | 17 | 12 | 3 | 2 | 6 | 8 | 2 | RIAA: 8× Platinum; ARIA: Platinum; BPI: 2× Platinum; RMNZ: 4× Platinum | Paper Trail |
| "Numba 1 (Tide Is High)" (Kardinal Offishall featuring Rihanna) | 2008 | — | — | 38 | — | — | — | — | — | — | — | | Not 4 Sale |
| "Run This Town" (Jay-Z featuring Rihanna and Kanye West) | 2009 | 2 | 9 | 6 | — | 18 | 3 | 9 | 8 | 9 | 1 | RIAA: 6× Platinum; ARIA: Platinum; BPI: 2× Platinum; BVMI: Gold; RMNZ: 3× Platinum | The Blueprint 3 |
| "Love the Way You Lie" (Eminem featuring Rihanna) | 2010 | 1 | 1 | 1 | 3 | 1 | 1 | 1 | 1 | 1 | 2 | RIAA: 13× Platinum; ARIA: 18× Platinum; BPI: 6× Platinum; BVMI: 5× Gold; IFPI SWI: 3× Platinum; RMNZ: 7× Platinum | Recovery |
| "Who's That Chick?" (David Guetta featuring Rihanna) | 2010 | 51 | 7 | 26 | 5 | 6 | 4 | 8 | 14 | 8 | 6 | ARIA: 2× Platinum; BPI: 2× Platinum; BVMI: Gold; GLF: Platinum; RMNZ: 2× Platinum | One Love |
| "All of the Lights" (Kanye West featuring Rihanna and Kid Cudi) | 2011 | 18 | 24 | 53 | 52 | — | 13 | 13 | — | 46 | 15 | RIAA: 8× Platinum; ARIA: 2× Platinum; BPI: 3× Platinum; BVMI: Gold; RMNZ: 4× Platinum | My Beautiful Dark Twisted Fantasy |
| "Fly" (Nicki Minaj featuring Rihanna) | 2011 | 19 | 18 | 55 | — | — | 14 | 13 | — | — | 16 | RIAA: Platinum; ARIA: 2× Platinum; BPI: Gold; RMNZ: Platinum | Pink Friday |
| "Take Care" (Drake featuring Rihanna) | 2012 | 7 | 9 | 15 | 27 | — | 18 | 6 | 49 | 50 | 9 | RIAA: 7× Platinum; ARIA: 7× Platinum; BPI: 3× Platinum; BVMI: Gold; MC: 2× Platinum; RMNZ: 3× Platinum | Take Care |
| "Bad" (Remix) (Wale featuring Rihanna) | 2013 | 21 | — | — | 141 | — | — | — | — | — | 112 | | The Gifted |
| "The Monster" (Eminem featuring Rihanna) | 2013 | 1 | 1 | 1 | 1 | 3 | 1 | 1 | 1 | 1 | 1 | RIAA: 8× Platinum; ARIA: 11× Platinum; BPI: 3× Platinum; BVMI: 3× Gold; GLF: 5× Platinum; IFPI SWI: Platinum; MC: 2× Platinum; RMNZ: 5× Platinum | The Marshall Mathers LP 2 |
| "Can't Remember to Forget You" (Shakira featuring Rihanna) | 2014 | 15 | 18 | 19 | 5 | 8 | 7 | 32 | 8 | 7 | 11 | ARIA: Platinum; BPI: Platinum; BVMI: Platinum; GLF: Platinum; IFPI SWI: Gold; MC: 2× Platinum; RMNZ: Platinum | Shakira |
| "This Is What You Came For" (Calvin Harris featuring Rihanna) | 2016 | 3 | 1 | 1 | 5 | 5 | 1 | 2 | 3 | 4 | 2 | RIAA: 8× Platinum; ARIA: 12× Platinum; BPI: 5× Platinum; BVMI: 3× Gold; GLF: 4× Platinum; MC: 4× Platinum; RMNZ: 7× Platinum; SNEP: Diamond | 96 Months |
| "Too Good" (Drake featuring Rihanna) | 2016 | 14 | 3 | 9 | 29 | 30 | 11 | 4 | 13 | 25 | 3 | RIAA: 5× Platinum; ARIA: 6× Platinum; BPI: 3× Platinum; BVMI: Gold; GLF: 3× Platinum; MC: 4× Platinum; RMNZ: 4× Platinum; SNEP: Platinum | Views |
| "Selfish" (Future featuring Rihanna) | 2017 | 37 | 37 | 28 | 34 | — | 78 | 17 | 80 | 51 | 94 | RIAA: Platinum; ARIA: Platinum; GLF: Gold; MC: 2× Platinum; RMNZ: 2× Platinum | Hndrxx |
| "Wild Thoughts" (DJ Khaled featuring Rihanna and Bryson Tiller) | 2017 | 2 | 2 | 2 | 2 | 4 | 3 | 2 | 4 | 3 | 1 | RIAA: 9× Platinum; ARIA: 7× Platinum; BPI: 4× Platinum; BVMI: 3× Gold; GLF: 3× Platinum; IFPI SWI: Platinum; MC: 5× Platinum; RMNZ: 6× Platinum; SNEP: Diamond | Grateful |
| "Loyalty" (Kendrick Lamar featuring Rihanna) | 2017 | 14 | 20 | 12 | 41 | 53 | 18 | 15 | 34 | 35 | 27 | RIAA: 2× Platinum; ARIA: 3× Platinum; BPI: Platinum; MC: 3× Platinum; RMNZ: 3× Platinum | Damn |
"—" denotes a recording that did not chart or was not released in that territory.

== Charity singles ==
List of charity singles, with selected chart positions, and showing year released
| Title | Year | Peak chart positions | | | | | | |
| Title | Year | US | AUS | CAN | IRL | NZ | SWE | UK |
|---|---|---|---|---|---|---|---|---|
| "Just Stand Up!" (as part of Artists Stand Up to Cancer) | 2008 | 11 | 39 | 10 | 11 | 19 | 51 | 26 |
| "Redemption Song" | 2010 | 81 | — | 82 | — | — | — | — |
"—" denotes a recording that did not chart or was not released in that territory.

== Promotional singles ==
List of songs, with selected chart positions, showing year released and album name
| Title | Year | Peak chart positions | | | | | | | | | | Certifications | Album |
| Title | Year | US | US Dance | US R&B | FRA | GER | IRL | SWE | SWI | UK | UK R&B | Certifications | Album |
|---|---|---|---|---|---|---|---|---|---|---|---|---|---|
| "Breakin' Dishes" | 2008 | 82 | 4 | — | — | 40 | 25 | 55 | 46 | 19 | 2 | RIAA: Platinum; ARIA: 2× Platinum; BPI: Platinum; BVMI: Gold; RMNZ: 2× Platinum | Good Girl Gone Bad |
| "Sex with Me" | 2017 | 83 | 1 | 33 | 52 | — | — | — | — | 130 | 25 | RIAA: 4× Platinum; ARIA: Platinum; BPI: Platinum; RMNZ: 2× Platinum; SNEP: Gold | Anti |
| "Pose" | 2017 | — | 1 | — (Note: "Pose" did not enter the Hot R&B/Hip-Hop Songs chart, but peaked at number 38 on the R&B/Hip-Hop Digital Song Sales chart.) | 98 | — | — | — | — | — | — | | Anti |
| "Desperado" | 2017 | — (Note: "Desperado" did not enter the Billboard Hot 100, but peaked at number 7 on the Bubbling Under Hot 100 Singles chart.) | 1 | 39 | 109 | — | — | 90 | 51 | 129 | 19 | RIAA: 3× Platinum; ARIA: Platinum; BPI: Gold; RMNZ: Platinum; SNEP: Gold | Anti |
| "Consideration" (featuring SZA) | 2017 | — (Note: "Consideration" did not enter the Billboard Hot 100, but peaked at number 13 on the Bubbling Under Hot 100 Singles chart.) | 1 | 38 | 63 | — | — | 72 | — | 88 | 18 | RIAA: 2× Platinum; ARIA: Platinum; BPI: Gold; RMNZ: Platinum; SNEP: Gold | Anti |
"—" denotes a recording that did not chart or was not released in that territory.

== Other charted and certified songs ==
List of songs, with selected chart positions, showing year released and album name
| Title | Year | Peak chart positions | | | | | | | | | Certifications | Album |
| Title | Year | US | US R&B | CAN | FRA | IRL | SPA | SWI | UK | UK R&B | Certifications | Album |
|---|---|---|---|---|---|---|---|---|---|---|---|---|
| "There's a Thug in My Life" (featuring J-Status) | 2005 | — | — | — | — | — | — | — | — | — | RMNZ: Platinum | Music of the Sun |
| "A Girl like Me" | 2006 | — | — | — | — | — | 25 | — | — | — | | A Girl like Me |
| "A Million Miles Away" | 2006 | — | — | — | — | — | 38 | — | — | — | | A Girl like Me |
| "It Just Don't Feel Like Xmas (Without You)" | 2006 | — | — | — | — | — | — | — | — | — | | Now That's What I Call Christmas! 3 |
| "Bad Girl" (featuring Chris Brown) | 2009 | — | 55 | — | — | — | — | — | — | — | | Non-album song |
| "Stranded (Haiti Mon Amour)" (with Jay-Z, Bono and The Edge) | 2010 | 16 | — (Note: "Stranded (Haiti Mon Amour)" did not enter the Hot R&B/Hip-Hop Songs chart, but peaked at number 2 on the R&B/Hip-Hop Digital Song Sales chart.) | 6 | — | 3 | 30 | — | 41 | — | | Hope for Haiti Now |
| "Fading" | 2010 | — | — (Note: "Fading" did not enter the Hot R&B/Hip-Hop Songs chart, but peaked at number 42 on the R&B/Hip-Hop Digital Song Sales chart.) | — | — | — | — | — | 187 | 34 | | Loud |
| "Skin" | 2010 | — | — | — | — | — | — | — | — | — | RIAA: Gold; ARIA: Gold; BPI: Silver | Loud |
| "Love the Way You Lie (Part II)" (featuring Eminem) | 2010 | — | — | 19 | — | — | — | — | 160 | — | RIAA: Gold; ARIA: Platinum; BPI: Gold; RMNZ: Gold | Loud |
| "Cockiness (Love It)" | 2011 | — (Note: "Cockiness (Love It)" did not enter the Billboard Hot 100, but peaked at number 17 on the Bubbling Under Hot 100 Singles chart.) | — (Note: "Cockiness (Love It)" did not enter the Hot R&B/Hip-Hop Songs, but peaked at number 10 on the R&B/Hip-Hop Digital Song Sales chart.) | — (Note: "Cockiness (Love It)" did not enter the Canadian Hot 100, but peaked at number 75 on the Canadian Digital Song Sales chart.) | — | — | — | — | 121 | 33 | RIAA: Platinum; RMNZ: Gold | Talk That Talk |
| "Birthday Cake" | 2011 | 39 | 4 | — | — | — | — | — | 172 | — | RIAA: 2× Platinum; ARIA: Gold | Talk That Talk |
| "We All Want Love" | 2011 | — | — | — | — | — | — | — | 188 | — | | Talk That Talk |
| "Drunk on Love" | 2011 | — | — | — | — | — | — | — | 153 | 23 | | Talk That Talk |
| "Roc Me Out" | 2011 | — | — | — | — | — | — | — | 176 | — | | Talk That Talk |
| "Farewell" | 2011 | — | — | — | — | — | — | — | 155 | — | | Talk That Talk |
| "Red Lipstick" | 2011 | — | — | — | — | — | — | — | 122 | 34 | | Talk That Talk |
| "Do Ya Thang" | 2011 | — | — | — | — | — | — | — | 136 | 38 | | Talk That Talk |
| "Fool in Love" | 2011 | — | — | — | — | — | — | — | 123 | 35 | | Talk That Talk |
| "Phresh Out the Runway" | 2012 | — | — (Note: "Phresh Out the Runway" did not enter the Hot R&B/Hip-Hop Songs, but peaked at number 26 on the R&B/Hip-Hop Digital Song Sales chart.) | — | 185 | — | — | — | 177 | 35 | | Unapologetic |
| "Numb" (featuring Eminem) | 2012 | — | 42 | 99 | 128 | — | — | — | 92 | 13 | | Unapologetic |
| "Loveeeeeee Song" (featuring Future) | 2012 | 55 | 14 | — | 110 | — | — | — | 105 | 17 | RIAA: Platinum; ARIA: 2× Platinum; BPI: Platinum; RMNZ: 2× Platinum | Unapologetic |
| "Nobody's Business" (featuring Chris Brown) | 2012 | — | 39 | — | 36 | — | — | — | 63 | 7 | ARIA: Platinum; BPI: Silver; RMNZ: Platinum | Unapologetic |
| "Love Without Tragedy / Mother Mary" | 2012 | — | — | — | 95 | — | — | — | 113 | 19 | | Unapologetic |
| "No Love Allowed" | 2012 | — | — (Note: "No Love Allowed" did not enter the Hot R&B/Hip-Hop Songs chart, but peaked at number 36 on the R&B/Hip-Hop Digital Song Sales chart.) | — | 101 | — | — | — | 131 | 24 | | Unapologetic |
| "Lost in Paradise" | 2012 | — | — | — | 183 | — | — | — | — | — | | Unapologetic |
| "Half of Me" | 2012 | — | — | 96 | 70 | 84 | — | 46 | 75 | 10 | | Unapologetic |
| "As Real As You and Me" | 2015 | — | — | — | 96 | — | — | — | — | — | | Home |
| "Dancing in the Dark" | 2015 | — | — | — | 92 | — | — | — | — | — | RIAA: Platinum; ARIA: Platinum; BPI: Silver; RMNZ: Platinum | Home |
| "James Joint" | 2016 | — | — | — | — | — | — | — | — | — | RIAA: Platinum; RMNZ: Gold | Anti |
| "Woo" | 2016 | — | — (Note: "Woo" did not enter the Hot R&B/Hip-Hop Songs, but peaked at number 19 on the Hot R&B Songs chart.) | — | — | — | — | — | 158 | 32 | RIAA: Platinum; ARIA: Platinum; BPI: Silver; RMNZ: Gold; SNEP: Gold | Anti |
| "Yeah, I Said It" | 2016 | — (Note: "Yeah, I Said It" did not enter the Billboard Hot 100, but peaked at number 21 on the Bubbling Under Hot 100 Singles chart.) | 41 | — | — | — | — | — | 187 | 27 | RIAA: Platinum; ARIA: Gold; BPI: Silver; RMNZ: Gold | Anti |
| "Same Ol' Mistakes" | 2016 | — | — (Note: "Same Ol' Mistakes" did not enter the Hot R&B/Hip-Hop Songs, but peaked at number 44 on the R&B/Hip-Hop Digital Song Sales chart.) | — | 155 | — | — | — | 197 | 33 | RIAA: Platinum; ARIA: Gold; BPI: Silver; RMNZ: Gold | Anti |
| "Never Ending" | 2016 | — | — | — | 144 | — | — | — | — | — | RIAA: Gold | Anti |
| "Higher" | 2016 | — | — | — | 185 | — | — | — | — | — | RIAA: Platinum; RMNZ: Gold | Anti |
| "Close to You" | 2016 | — | — (Note: "Close to You" did not enter the Hot R&B/Hip-Hop Songs chart, but peaked at number 23 on the R&B Digital Song Sales chart.) | — | 136 | — | — | 61 | — | — | RIAA: Gold; ARIA: Gold; RMNZ: Gold | Anti |
| "Goodnight Gotham" | 2016 | — | — | — | 114 | — | — | — | — | — | | Anti |
| "Born Again" | 2022 | — (Note: "Born Again" did not enter the US Billboard Hot 100, but peaked at number 4 on the Bubbling Under Hot 100 Singles chart.) | 44 | — | — | — | — | 99 | — (Note: "Born Again" did not enter the UK Singles Chart but peaked at number 40 on the UK Single Downloads Chart.) | — | | Black Panther: Wakanda Forever – Music From and Inspired By |
"—" denotes a recording that did not chart or was not released in that territory.

== See also ==
- List of artists who have achieved simultaneous UK and US number-one hits
- List of artists who have achieved simultaneous number-one single and album in the United States
- List of artists who reached number one on the UK Singles Chart
- List of artists who reached number one on the U.S. Dance Club Songs chart
- List of artists who reached number one in the United States
