= Rihanna albums discography =

Recording collections by Barbadian singer

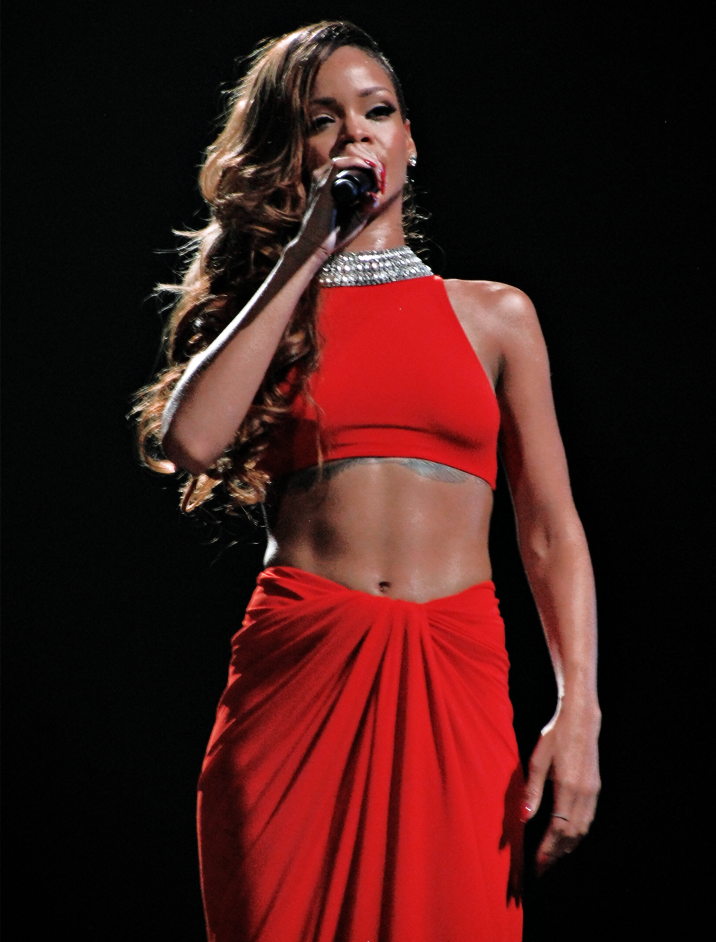
- Rihanna performing in Toronto during the Diamonds World Tour in March 2013.
- Studio albums: 8
- Extended plays: 3
- Soundtrack albums: 1
- Remix albums: 2
- Reissues: 1
- Box sets: 7

Barbadian singer Rihanna has released eight studio albums, two remix albums, one reissue, seven box sets and three extended plays. Since the beginning of her career in 2005, Rihanna has sold 60 million album units and 215 million digital tracks worldwide, making her one of the best-selling artists of all time. All of her albums have been certified platinum and multi-platinum in the United States by the Recording Industry Association of America (RIAA) and have certifications of 29 million copies sold in the country.

Rihanna released her debut studio album, Music of the Sun in August 2005. It reached the top ten on the Canadian Albums and the US Billboard 200 charts; it was certified platinum by the Recording Industry Association of America (RIAA) and sold over 623,000 copies in the country. As of 2015, Music of the Sun had sold over two million copies worldwide. The next year, she released her second studio album, A Girl Like Me (2006). It topped the albums chart in Canada and reached number five on both the UK Albums and the US Billboard 200 charts. It was certified two-times platinum by Music Canada (MC), the British Phonographic Industry (BPI), and RIAA; it sold over four million copies worldwide. Good Girl Gone Bad (2007), Rihanna's third studio album, peaked at number two on the US Billboard 200 chart and was certified seven-times platinum by RIAA in the United States and six-times Platinum by BPI in the United Kingdom. The next year, it was reissued under the title Good Girl Gone Bad: Reloaded (2008) with several new songs. It had sold over nine million copies worldwide, as of 2017.

Rihanna's fourth studio album, Rated R (2009), peaked at number one on the Swiss Albums Chart and sold over three million copies worldwide. It was also certified two-times platinum by both BPI and RIAA. Rihanna's fifth studio album Loud was released in November 2010. Loud peaked at number one on the UK Albums Chart and was certified six-times platinum by the BPI. The album was also certified three-times platinum in the United States and had sold over eight million copies worldwide. The next year, she released her sixth studio album, Talk That Talk (2011). It became Rihanna's third number one record in the United Kingdom and sold over one million copies in the country. It was also certified three-times platinum by the RIAA and sold over 5.5 million copies worldwide.

Rihanna's seventh studio album, Unapologetic (2012) became Rihanna's first record to top the Billboard 200 chart and received a three-times platinum certification by RIAA. It also peaked at number one on the album charts in Canada, Ireland, Switzerland and the United Kingdom; it had sold over four million copies worldwide. She released her eighth album, Anti in 2016; it peaked at number one in Canada and the United States and was certified six-times platinum by the RIAA.

== Studio albums ==
List of studio albums, with selected chart positions, sales figures and certifications
Title	Album details	Peak chart positions										Sales	Certifications
Title	Album details	AUS	BEL (FL)	CAN	FRA	GER	IRL	NZ	SWI	UK	US	Sales	Certifications
Music of the Sun	Released: August 12, 2005 (US); Label: Def Jam, SRP; Formats: CD, CD/DVD, LP, digital download, streaming	— (Note: Music of the Sun did not enter the ARIA Top 100 Albums Chart, but peaked at number 18 on the ARIA Top 20 Hitseekers Albums Chart.)	—	7	93	31	12	26	38	35	10	UK: 148,660 (Note: United Kingdom sales figures for Music of the Sun, A Girl Like Me, Good Girl Gone Bad and Rated R as of November 2012.); US: 623,000 (Note: United States sales figures for all the studio albums as of June 2015.)	RIAA: Platinum; BPI: Gold; BVMI: Gold; MC: Platinum; RMNZ: Platinum
A Girl Like Me	Released: April 11, 2006 (US); Label: Def Jam, SRP; Formats: CD, LP, digital download, streaming	9	10	1	18	13	5	7	6	5	5	UK: 667,672; US: 1,400,000	RIAA: 2× Platinum; ARIA: 3× Platinum; BPI: 2× Platinum; BRMA: Gold; BVMI: Platinum; IFPI SWI: Platinum; IRMA: 2× Platinum; MC: 2× Platinum; RMNZ: 2× Platinum
Good Girl Gone Bad	Released: June 5, 2007 (US); Label: Def Jam, SRP; Formats: CD, CD/DVD, LP, digital download, streaming	2	9	1	8	4	1	4	1	1	2	UK: 1,904,347 (Note: United Kingdom sales figures for Good Girl Gone Bad and Loud as of February 2016); US: 2,800,000	RIAA: 7× Platinum; ARIA: 8× Platinum; BPI: 8× Platinum; BRMA: 2× Platinum; BVMI: 4× Platinum; IFPI SWI: 3× Platinum; IRMA: 3× Platinum; MC: 5× Platinum; RMNZ: 7× Platinum; SNEP: Platinum
Rated R	Released: November 23, 2009 (US); Label: Def Jam, SRP; Formats: CD, LP, digital download, streaming	12	16	5	10	4	7	14	1	9	4	UK: 701,298; US: 1,130,000	RIAA: 2× Platinum; ARIA: Platinum; BPI: 2× Platinum; BRMA: Gold; BVMI: Platinum; IFPI SWI: Platinum; IRMA: Platinum; MC: Platinum; RMNZ: Platinum; SNEP: Platinum
Loud	Released: November 16, 2010 (US); Label: Def Jam, SRP; Formats: CD, CD/DVD, LP, digital download, streaming	2	3	1	3	2	1	4	1	1	3	FRA: 355,000 (Note: France sales figures for Loud, Talk That Talk and Unapologetic as of May 2013.); UK: 1,950,864; US: 1,800,000	RIAA: 5× Platinum; ARIA: 4× Platinum; BPI: 8× Platinum; BRMA: Platinum; BVMI: 5× Gold; IFPI SWI: 2× Platinum; IRMA: 5× Platinum; MC: 3× Platinum; RMNZ: 6× Platinum
Talk That Talk	Released: November 21, 2011 (US); Label: Def Jam, SRP; Formats: CD, LP, digital download, streaming	5	3	3	2	3	2	1	1	1	3	FRA: 200,000; UK: 1,000,000 (Note: United Kingdom sales figures for Talk That Talk and Unapologetic as of May 2013.); US: 1,150,000	RIAA: 4× Platinum; ARIA: 2× Platinum; BPI: 3× Platinum; BRMA: Gold; BVMI: Platinum; IFPI SWI: Platinum; IRMA: 3× Platinum; RMNZ: 4× Platinum
Unapologetic	Released: November 19, 2012 (US); Label: Def Jam, SRP; Formats: CD, CD/DVD, LP, digital download, streaming	8	2	1	3	3	1	5	1	1	1	FRA: 240,000; UK: 635,000; US: 1,200,000	RIAA: 3× Platinum; ARIA: 2× Platinum; BPI: 3× Platinum; BRMA: Gold; BVMI: 3× Gold; IRMA: 2× Platinum; MC: Platinum; RMNZ: 5× Platinum
Anti	Released: January 28, 2016; Label: Westbury Road, Roc Nation; Formats: CD, LP, digital download, streaming	5	8	1	6	3	2	5	2	7	1	US: 603,000 (Note: US sales figures for Anti as of December 2016. Although an additional 1.4 million copies were downloaded for free from Tidal, Billboard and Nielsen Music did not recognize them, because they were distributed for free by Samsung.)	RIAA: 6× Platinum; ARIA: 2× Platinum; BPI: 2× Platinum; BRMA: 2× Platinum; BVMI: Gold; MC: 4× Platinum; RMNZ: 7× Platinum; SNEP: 3× Platinum
"—" denotes a recording that did not chart or was not released in that territory.

== Remix albums ==
List of remix albums, with selected chart positions
Title	Album details	Peak chart positions			
Title	Album details	GRE	US	US Dance	US R&B
Good Girl Gone Bad: The Remixes	Released: January 27, 2009 (US); Label: Def Jam; Formats: CD, digital download	—	106	4	59
Rated R: Remixed	Released: May 25, 2010 (US); Label: Def Jam; Formats: CD, digital download	4	158	6	33
"—" denotes a recording that did not chart or was not released in that territory.

== Reissues ==
List of album re-issues, with selected chart positions and certifications
Title	Album details	Peak chart positions		Certifications
Title	Album details	JPN	NZ	Certifications
Good Girl Gone Bad: Reloaded	Released: June 2, 2008; Label: Def Jam; Formats: CD, CD/DVD, LP, digital download	95	4	RMNZ: Platinum

== Box sets ==
List of box sets, with selected chart positions
Title	Album details	Peak chart positions	
Title	Album details	FRA	US R&B
3 CD Collector's Set	Released: December 15, 2009 (US); Label: Def Jam; Format: CD	—	80
Music of the Sun / A Girl Like Me / Good Girl Gone Bad	Released: June 22, 2011 (JPN); Label: Def Jam; Formats: CD box set	—	—
Coffret 4 CD	Released: October 17, 2011 (FRA); Label: Def Jam; Formats: CD box set	55	—
Music of the Sun / A Girl Like Me	Released: December 5, 2012 (JPN); Label: Def Jam; Formats: CD box set	—	—
Good Girl Gone Bad / Rated R	Released: December 5, 2012 (JPN); Label: Def Jam; Formats: CD box set	—	—
Rated R + Loud	Released: August 2, 2013 (GER); Label: Def Jam; Formats: CD	—	—
Vinyl Box Set	Released: December 16, 2016; Label: Def Jam; Formats: 15-LP box set	—	—
"—" denotes a recording that did not chart or was not released in that territory.

== EPs ==
List of extended plays, with details
Title	Details
Don't Stop the Music (Hit Pack)	Released: August 2007 (AUS); Label: Def Jam; Format: Streamed audio
Don't Stop the Music (5 Track)	Released: January 1, 2007 (DE); Label: Def Jam; Format: Digital download
Rated R (Nokia Singles Edition)	Released: March 3, 2010; Label: Def Jam; Format: Digital download; Includes: First three singles and Nokia bonus tracks

== Soundtrack contributions ==
List of soundtrack contributions, showing album details and album name
Title	Album details	Song
Home: Original Motion Picture Soundtrack	Released: March 13, 2015; Label: Westbury Road; Roc Nation; Formats: Digital download; CD	"Towards the Sun", "As Real as You and Me", "Dancing in the Dark"
Black Panther: Wakanda Forever – Music from and Inspired By	Released: November 4, 2022 (US); Label: Roc Nation; Def Jam; Hollywood; Formats: CD; LP; digital download; streaming	"Lift Me Up", "Born Again"
Smurfs Movie Soundtrack (Music From & Inspired By)	Released: June 13, 2025; Label: Roc Nation Distribution; Formats:	"Friend of Mine"

== See also ==
- Rihanna singles discography
- List of best-selling music artists
- List of best-selling female music artists in the United Kingdom
- List of Billboard Hot 100 chart achievements and milestones
