= Order Up =

2025 short film directed by Sean Charmatz

- Directed by: Sean Charmatz (Note: Storyboard and animatic director); Alan Smart (Note: Animation and supervising director)
- Written by: Sean Charmatz; Paul Tibbitt
- Based on: SpongeBob SquarePants by Stephen Hillenburg
- Produced by: Jennie Monica Hammond
- Starring: Tom Kenny; Rodger Bumpass
- Edited by: Christopher Hink
- Storyboard by: Ted Seko
- Music by: Barry Anthony; Mike Bolger; Steve Belfer; Nicolas Carr; Sage Guyton; Jeremy Wakefield
- Production companies: Nickelodeon Movies; Nickelodeon Animation Studio (Note: Animation outsourced to Rough Draft Studios.); United Plankton Pictures
- Distributed by: Paramount Pictures
- Release dates: June 10, 2025 (Annecy); July 18, 2025 (with Smurfs)
- Running time: 2 minutes
- Country: United States

Order Up is a 2025 American animated comedy short film based on the SpongeBob SquarePants television series, created by Stephen Hillenburg. Co-written by Sean Charmatz and Paul Tibbitt, the film features no dialogue but utilizes vocal sound effects and centers on SpongeBob (Tom Kenny) as he overuses the Krusty Krab's order up bell, sending his irritable co-worker Squidward (Rodger Bumpass) into a fit of rage.

The short film was produced by Nickelodeon Animation Studio in 2011–2012 but remained unreleased for several years. Order Up premiered at the Annecy International Animation Film Festival on June 10, 2025, and was released in theaters on July 18, 2025, along with screenings of Smurfs.

== Plot ==
During one of his shifts at the Krusty Krab, SpongeBob amuses himself by overusing the restaurant's order up bell, much to the dismay of his grumpy co-worker and neighbor, Squidward. Squidward takes apart the bell, but SpongeBob tapes its pieces back together, making him furious. Squidward destroys the bell in multiple ways while a saddened SpongeBob watches, then dumps the remains into SpongeBob's head. SpongeBob discovers he can still make the bell's sound by hitting his nose, causing Squidward to run out of the Krusty Krab screaming.

== Voice cast ==
- Tom Kenny as SpongeBob SquarePants
- Rodger Bumpass as Squidward Tentacles

== Production ==
In May 2025, it was reported that two animated short films, Order Up and Teenage Mutant Ninja Turtles: Chrome Alone 2 – Lost in New Jersey, would debut at Paramount Animation and Nickelodeon's presentation at the Annecy International Animation Film Festival in June 2025. Order Up features no dialogue. The short was produced in 2011–2012 and received a picture lock in 2015, but remained unreleased for several years.

Order Up was directed by Sean Charmatz, who served as a storyboard director, writer, and artist on the main SpongeBob SquarePants television series. Charmatz co-wrote it with series veteran and former showrunner Paul Tibbitt. Other credits include Tibbitt and series creator Stephen Hillenburg as executive producers; Jennie Monica Hammond as producer; Vincent Waller as creative director; Alan Smart as animation and supervising director; Peter Bennett as art director; and Alvaro Zalaya as production manager.

== Release ==
Order Up premiered at the Annecy International Animation Film Festival on June 10, 2025, and was released in theaters on July 18, 2025, along with screenings of Smurfs. The film has yet to be released on home video or streaming.

== Reception ==
Wilson Chapman of IndieWire opined that the short was better than the feature film it was attached to, Smurfs, referring to it as a "fun, charming, and mercifully brief adaptation of a beloved cartoon". Travis Hopson of Punch Drunk Critics shared a similar opinion, saying that Order Up was the only reason to see Smurfs in theaters. Joe Bendel of Cinema Daily US called the short a pleasant bonus to the main feature.
