= Hope for Haiti Now =

2010 charity telethon

- Also known as: Hope for Haiti Now: A Global Benefit for Earthquake Relief
- Genre: Telethon
- Created by: George Clooney; Wyclef Jean; Joel Gallen
- Developed by: George Clooney; Wyclef Jean; Joel Gallen; MTV Networks
- Presented by: George Clooney; Anderson Cooper; Wyclef Jean
- Countries of origin: Haiti; United Kingdom; United States
- Original language: English

Production
- Executive producer: George Clooney Joel Gallen
- Running time: 2 hours
- Production company: MTV Networks

Original release
- Release: January 22, 2010

Hope for Haiti Now: A Global Benefit for Earthquake Relief was a charity telethon held on January 22, 2010, from 8 p.m. to 10 p.m. Eastern Standard Time (January 23, 2010 from 1 a.m. to 3 a.m. UTC). The telethon was the most widely distributed telethon in history. The event was broadcast from Studio 36 at CBS Television City in Los Angeles, Kaufman Astoria Studios in Queens, New York and a private club, The Hospital, in London. There were also live reports from Haiti.

Initial plans for the telethon were announced by MTV Networks on January 15, 2010, three days after the 2010 Haiti earthquake struck on January 12 that is assumed to have claimed the lives of about 200,000 people. The event was one of a number of humanitarian responses to the earthquake. Processing of the telethon's donations was in the hands of the Entertainment Industry Foundation. The telethon was patterned after the form begun with the 2001 America: A Tribute to Heroes program and continued with the 2005 Shelter from the Storm: A Concert for the Gulf Coast.

Funds raised by the telethon and from the sale of an accompanying album and video, which was immediately made available for pre-order on iTunes, were distributed to seven non-profit organizations doing relief work in Haiti.

== Recipients ==
Funds were distributed to the following organizations with humanitarian operations in Haiti:

- The Clinton Bush Haiti Fund
- United Nations World Food Programme
- Oxfam America
- Partners In Health
- Red Cross
- UNICEF
- Yéle Haiti Foundation

In 2012 The New York Times reported that a forensic audit conducted by the New York Attorney General's office found that much of the money distributed to the Yéle Haiti organization from the telethon was retained by founder Wyclef Jean and his associates for their own benefit.

== Audience and proceeds raised ==
The event drew an estimated audience of 83 million viewers in the United States between the initial broadcast and web and mobile streams throughout the weekend.

On January 23, it was reported that the telethon had raised over US$58 million, not including corporate and large private donors or sales of the album and video. The amount is a record for donations by the general public to a telethon for disaster-relief. On January 25 the figure was revised to $61 million.

Viewers were encouraged to donate online, calling toll-free (1-877-99-HAITI), by texting or by mail. Donations were accepted up to six months after the broadcast.

== Participants ==
Wyclef Jean hosted the concert in New York City, with George Clooney in Los Angeles and Anderson Cooper in Haiti.

Rihanna performed a song titled "Stranded (Haiti Mon Amour)", together with Jay-Z and U2's The Edge and Bono from London.

In San Francisco, Clint Eastwood and Matt Damon appealed for donations.

=== Appearance order ===
The telethon began and ended with images of victims in Haiti. Presented in a format similar to 2001's America: A Tribute to Heroes, the two-hour broadcast consisted of musical performances with speeches, reports from Haiti, and conversations between celebrity operators and donors calling in.

Times in the table are given from the beginning of the show (8 p.m. U.S. ET/1 a.m. UTC) and are based on the CBS airing in the US. Descriptions are mostly from the MTV blog.

Hope for Haiti Now (2010)
Time	Location (type)	People	Description
0:00:04	Los Angeles	Alicia Keys	"Prelude to a Kiss"
0:03:48	Los Angeles (live)	George Clooney	speech: introduction
0:05:13	London	Coldplay	"A Message 2010"
0:09:17	Los Angeles	Halle Berry	speech: story of Monley Elize
0:10:56	New York (live)	Bruce Springsteen with some members of The Sessions Band	"We Shall Overcome"
0:13:47	(phone bank)		phone bank: slow pan
0:14:09	Haiti	Anderson Cooper	report
0:16:21	Los Angeles	Leonardo DiCaprio	speech: doctor's setbacks
0:17:49	Los Angeles	Stevie Wonder with choir	"A Time 2 Love" / "Bridge over Troubled Water"
0:21:47	New York	Wyclef Jean	speech: in English and Haitian Creole
0:23:36	New York	Shakira with The Roots	"I'll Stand by You"
0:27:32	(phone bank)	Reese Witherspoon	phone bank: call
0:28:36	Haiti	Anderson Cooper	report: orphanage director
0:31:43	Los Angeles	John Legend	"Motherless Child"
0:35:54	New York	Jon Stewart	speech: survivors from the rubble
0:36:57	New York	Mary J. Blige	"Hard Times Come Again No More"
0:40:55	(phone bank)	Samuel L. Jackson	speech: in front of phone bank
0:42:01	Haiti (recorded)	Ray LaMontagne	photos and short clips (background song "Shelter")
0:43:39	Los Angeles	Mickelson Civil	speech: by a Haitian citizen
0:45:12	Los Angeles	Taylor Swift	"Breathless" (by Better Than Ezra)
0:49:01	Haiti	?	clip: Day 1; Day 6
0:50:16	Los Angeles	Nicole Kidman	speech: story of Jeannette and Roger
0:51:32	Los Angeles	Christina Aguilera	"Lift Me Up"
0:55:17	(phone bank)	Julia Roberts	phone bank: call
0:56:26	Haiti (recorded)	Anderson Cooper	clip: streets of downtown Port-au-Prince
0:58:08	(phone bank)		phone bank
0:58:22	London	Robert Pattinson	speech: on Maxine Fallon
0:59:16	New York	Sting with The Roots and Chris Botti on trumpet	"Driven to Tears"
1:02:58	San Francisco	Matt Damon and Clint Eastwood	speech: peacekeepers who lost their lives
1:04:11	London	Beyoncé with Chris Martin on acoustic guitar	"Halo"
1:07:44	(phone bank)	Steven Spielberg	phone bank: call with Presbyterian pastor
1:10:07	Los Angeles	Morgan Freeman	speech: poem by Kalamu ya Salaam;
1:11:17	Los Angeles	Sheryl Crow, Kid Rock, and Keith Urban	"Lean on Me"
1:14:54	Haiti (live)	Anderson Cooper	report: interview with teenage girl (Bea) rescued the first day
1:17:03	New York (live)	Bill Clinton	speech: special envoy/Clinton Bush Haiti Fund
1:19:07	New York	Madonna with choir	"Like a Prayer"
1:22:39	Los Angeles	Ben Stiller	speech: schools in Haiti
1:24:02	Haiti (recorded)	Sanjay Gupta	clip: makeshift medical facilities
1:25:18	Haiti (live)	Sanjay Gupta with Anderson Cooper	report: lack of basic antibiotics
1:27:03	Los Angeles (live)	Catherine Porter	Speech: A Haitian-American woman talks about her planned adoption of 2 year old Amalia
1:28:07	Los Angeles	Justin Timberlake and Matt Morris featuring Charlie Sexton	"Hallelujah"
1:32:22	(phone bank)	Taylor Swift	phone bank: call
1:32:51	Los Angeles (live)	Muhammad Ali and Chris Rock	speech: Chris reads message by Ali
1:34:15	New York	Jennifer Hudson with The Roots	"Let It Be"
1:38:10	Haiti (live)	Anderson Cooper	report: interview with boy Monley Elize and International Medical Corps nurse
1:39:50	Los Angeles (live)	Brad Pitt	speech: intro for Haitian singer Emeline Michel
1:40:31	Los Angeles	Emeline Michel	"Many Rivers to Cross"
1:43:31	Los Angeles (live)	Tom Hanks	speech: Farina L'Enjou, who spent 60 hours looking for his family
1:45:08	London (recorded)	Jay-Z, Rihanna, The Edge, and Bono	"Stranded (Haiti Mon Amour)" (produced by Swizz Beatz and Declan Gaffney)
1:49:35	(phone bank)	Stevie Wonder	phone bank: call
1:50:12	Los Angeles	Julia Roberts	speech: Daphne's baby
1:51:21	Los Angeles	Dave Matthews and Neil Young	"Alone and Forsaken" (by Hank Williams)
1:54:51	Los Angeles (live)	Denzel Washington	speech: long but possible; Martin Luther King quote
1:55:39	New York	Wyclef Jean	"Rivers of Babylon" / "Yéle"; Wyclef & Melky Jean duet
1:59:50	Haiti		photo

Locations of performers announced by USA Today:

- New York City: Wyclef Jean, Madonna, Bruce Springsteen, Jennifer Hudson, Mary J. Blige, Shakira, and Sting
- Los Angeles: Alicia Keys, Christina Aguilera, Dave Matthews, Neil Young, John Legend, Justin Timberlake, Stevie Wonder, Taylor Swift, Emeline Michel, and a group performance by Keith Urban, Kid Rock, and Sheryl Crow
- London: Beyoncé, Coldplay, Bono, The Edge, Jay-Z, and Rihanna. Performances by Bono, The Edge, Jay-Z, and Rihanna were pre-recorded earlier in the day.

=== Celebrity phone operators ===
Celebrity phone bank operators in alphabetical order (by surname):

- Ben Affleck
- Tim Allen
- Jennifer Aniston
- David Archuleta
- Alec Baldwin
- Ellen Barkin
- Drew Barrymore
- Garcelle Beauvais
- Jack Black
- Emily Blunt
- Russell Brand
- Benjamin Bratt
- Pierce Brosnan
- Gerard Butler
- Chevy Chase
- Kristin Chenoweth
- Sacha Baron Cohen
- Sean Combs
- Common
- Bradley Cooper
- Cat Cora
- Miranda Cosgrove
- Daniel Craig
- Cindy Crawford
- Penélope Cruz
- Billy Crystal
- John Cusack
- Miley Cyrus
- Daniel Day-Lewis
- Eric Dane
- Robert De Niro
- Ellen DeGeneres
- Leonardo DiCaprio
- Snoop Dogg
- Robert Downey Jr.
- Fran Drescher
- Michael Clarke Duncan
- Zac Efron
- Jenna Elfman
- Anna Faris
- Colin Farrell
- Andy García
- Mel Gibson
- Tyrese Gibson
- Selena Gomez
- Regina Hall
- Tom Hanks
- Neil Patrick Harris
- Taraji P. Henson
- Djimon Hounsou
- Terrence Howard
- Vanessa Hudgens
- Randy Jackson
- Jimmy Jean-Louis
- Elton John
- Dwayne Johnson
- Joe Jonas
- Kevin Jonas
- Nick Jonas
- Quincy Jones
- Victoria Justice
- Diane Keaton
- Michael Keaton
- Anna Kendrick
- Greg Kinnear
- Jane Krakowski
- John Krasinski
- Jessica Lange
- Queen Latifah
- Taylor Lautner
- Jared Leto
- Justin Long
- Jennifer Lopez
- Demi Lovato
- Tobey Maguire
- Ricky Martin
- Rose McGowan
- Ewan McGregor
- Katharine McPhee
- Debra Messing
- Alyssa Milano
- Shemar Moore
- Jack Nicholson
- Keke Palmer
- Holly Robinson Peete
- Katy Perry
- Tyler Perry
- Chris Pine
- Jeremy Piven
- Jeremy Renner
- Tim Robbins
- Emma Roberts
- Julia Roberts
- Ray Romano
- Jeri Ryan
- Meg Ryan
- Zoe Saldaña
- Adam Sandler
- Nicole Scherzinger
- Gabourey Sidibe
- Kimora Lee Simmons
- Russell Simmons
- Jessica Simpson
- Molly Sims
- Christian Slater
- Steven Spielberg
- Ringo Starr
- Taylor Swift
- Raven-Symoné
- Charlize Theron
- Justin Timberlake
- Ashley Tisdale
- Marisa Tomei
- Amber Valletta
- Sofia Vergara
- Mark Wahlberg
- Joe Walsh
- Sigourney Weaver
- Forest Whitaker
- Olivia Wilde
- Robin Williams
- Rainn Wilson
- Reese Witherspoon
- Stevie Wonder
- Noah Wyle

== Coverage ==
- Online Internationally: live on YouTube, MSN.com, Comedycentral.com, CNN.com Live, Bebo and the CNN iPhone app. The program was also streamed on delay on Sacramento Fox affiliate KTXL's website, FOX40.com, during the Pacific Time Zone airing of the telethon.
- Online Domestic (USA): live on Hulu
- Latin America: The show aired live on CNN en Español, CNN International, MTV Latin America, VH1 Latin America, National Geographic Channel, MuchMusic, Warner Channel, People and Arts, Discovery Home and Health, E!, Animax, Cartoon Network and Boomerang. CNN en Español. C5N aired the program with voiceovers translating reports, phone conversations and introductions to the musical presentations in Spanish.
- Australia (times AEDT): live at noon on MTV Australia, VH1 Australia, CNN, and Network Ten; and repeated at 8:30 p.m. on National Geographic Channel, 9 p.m. on E! and 10 p.m. on Style Network.
- Austria: The show aired live on ORF 1, MTV Austria and VIVA Austria.
- Belgium: The show was broadcast live at 2:00 CET on CNN International, National Geographic Channel, MTV, TMF.
- Brazil: The show aired live on MTV Brasil, National Geographic Channel, People+Arts, E!, Discovery Home&Health, CNN International and Warner Channel. Also, Cartoon Network and sister channels borrowed the signal from MTV Brasil.
- Bulgaria: The show was broadcast at 8:40 CET on BNT 1.
- Canada: The show aired on CTV, CBC Television, Global, Citytv, MuchMusic, CP24 and MTV Canada, simulcasting with the American airing. Depending on time zone, this was preceded or followed by Canada for Haiti. The show was also streamed live via CTV.ca, GlobalTv.com, Citytv.com and CP24.com.
- Czech Republic: The show was broadcast at 2:00 p.m. CET on ČT24, January 23.
- Croatia: The show aired on Croatian Radiotelevision and MTV Adria
- Denmark: The show aired on TV2 Denmark, National Geographic Channel CNN and MTV between 2:00 and 4:00 a.m. and on TV3 the 23rd between 8:00 and 10:00 p.m. local time
- Finland: The show aired on YLE Teema.
- France: The show aired on BFM TV and MTV France.
- Germany: The show aired live on MTV Germany, VIVA Germany, TNT Serie and National Geographic Channel.
- Greece: The show aired live on MTV Greece.
- Hong Kong: The show aired live (9:00 a.m.) and repeated at 9:00 p.m. on MTV Asia and at 8:00 p.m. on TVB Pearl with Chinese subtitles. (All in local time on January 23, 2010)
- Hungary: The show aired on MTV Hungary, Viva Hungary and National Geographic Channel.
- India: The show aired on VH1 India.
- Indonesia: The show aired on Global TV (Indonesia).
- Ireland: The show aired live (1:00 to 3:00 WET) on TV3 and on MTV UK & Ireland and VH1 UK, Viva, CNN International, BET, National Geographic, Style Network and E!
- Israel: The show aired at 3 a.m. on Channel 10, as well as MTV, National Geographic Channel, VH1 and CNN International.
- Italy: The show aired at 2 a.m. on MTV Italia.
- Macedonia: The show aired on several broadcasters, including MRTV, A1, Kanal 5, Alfa TV.
- Netherlands: The show was broadcast live at 2:00 CET on Nederland 3, CNN International, National Geographic Channel Nederland, MTV NL, TMF Nederland, VH1 Europe and VH1 Classic Europe.
- Norway: The show aired live on TVNorge and National Geographic Channel. It will also be repeated on NRK3 at 9:30 p.m. CET on January 23.
- Poland: The show aired live on MTV Poland, VH1 Poland, National Geographic Polska and VIVA Polska.
- Portugal: The show aired live on MTV Portugal at 1:00 a.m. local time on January 23.
- Romania: The show aired live on Antena 3, at local time 3 a.m.
- Russia: The show aired live on MTV Russia.
- Serbia:The show aired live on B92 Info.
- Slovakia: The show repeated on TV Doma at 10:30 a.m. on January 23.
- Slovenia: The show aired live on TV Slo 1 and TV3.
- Sweden: The show aired live on MTV Sweden, TV4 and Kanal 5. It was repeated on SVT1, TV3, and MTV the following day.
- Turkey: The show aired live on MTV Turkey, TNT, National Geographic Channel, CNN Türk.
- Ukraine: The show aired live on MTV Ukraine.
- United Kingdom: The show was broadcast live at 1 a.m. GMT on all MTV UK & Ireland and VH1 UK, Viva, CNN International, BET, National Geographic Channel (UK), Style Network and E!. News channels were allowed to opt in to show coverage. The show was repeated on January 24 at 9 a.m. UTC on MTV and Viva.
- United States: The program aired live at 8 p.m. ET and tape-delayed in the PT at 8 p.m. on the MTV group of channels (including MTV, VH1, and CMT), as well as on ABC, CBS, Fox, NBC, PBS, The CW, BET, CNN, CNN International, MSNBC, TNT, Comedy Central, Bravo (US), Oxygen, E!, Style Network, G4, Fuse TV, ReelzChannel, MLB Network, Current TV, Discovery Health, HBO and Showtime (main channels only), National Geographic Channel, Soapnet, Centric, Smithsonian Channel, Planet Green, and The Weather Channel. On channels that had only one national feed, such as CNN, the program was televised live coast-co-coast on these channels, at 8 p.m. ET / 5 p.m. PT. The program was also streamed on delay by FOX40.com.
- Uruguay: The program aired live on Monte Carlo TV
- South East Asia: The program was aired live on MTV Asia and CNN International at 8 a.m. (UTC+8).

== Discography ==
The digital album Hope for Haiti Now set a record as the largest one-day album pre-order in iTunes history, and became the top-selling iTunes album in 18 countries. The digital album has since become available at Amazon.com and Rhapsody. The album features 19 live performances from the broadcast as well as a pre-recorded version of "Stranded (Haiti Mon Amour)" and is priced at $7.99. The full two-hour video of the event is priced at $2.99.

=== Album ===
Year	Title	Peak chart positions				Certifications (sales thresholds)
Year	Title	US	CAN	NZ	DEN	Certifications (sales thresholds)
2010	Hope for Haiti Now: Released: January 23, 2010; Label: MTV Networks; Genre: Pop	1	1	9	7	

=== Singles ===
Year	Title	Peak chart positions						Album
Year	Title	US	CAN	UK	IRE	NOR	SWE	Album
2010	"A Message 2010"	—	—	88	—	—	—	Hope for Haiti Now
2010	"Hallelujah"	13	5	91	46	—	10	Hope for Haiti Now
2010	"Let It Be"	98	—	97	—	—	—	Hope for Haiti Now
2010	"Stranded (Haiti Mon Amour)"	16	6	41	3	6	3	Hope for Haiti Now

== See also ==
- Canada for Haiti
- Chile helps Chile
- Ensemble pour Haïti
- Everybody Hurts § Helping Haiti charity single
- Humanitarian response by non-governmental organizations to the 2010 Haiti earthquake
- List of highest-grossing benefit concerts
- We Are the World: 25 for Haiti
