= Spencer X =

American beatboxer (born 1992)

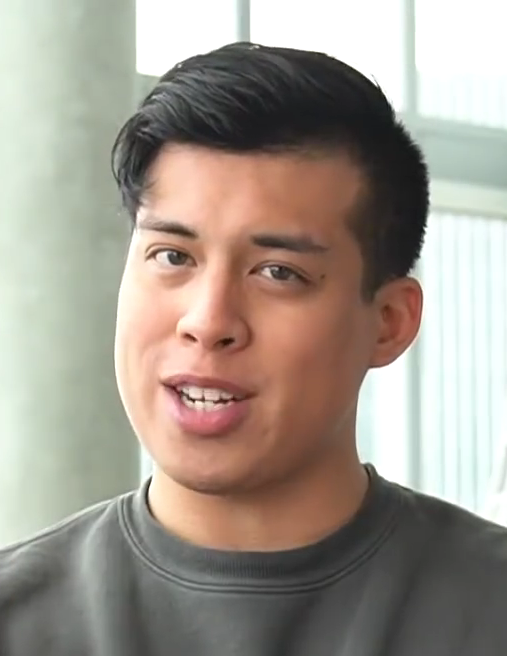
- Knight in 2020
- Born: Spencer Polanco Knight; April 20, 1992 (age 34); Manhattan, New York City
- Years active: 2012–present

Instagram information
- Page: Spencer X
- Followers: 1 million

TikTok information
- Page: Spencer X
- Followers: 53.6 million

YouTube information
- Channel: Spencer X
- Genre: Music
- Subscribers: 2.61 million
- Views: 170 million
- Last updated: July 24, 2026

Spencer Polanco Knight (born April 20, 1992), also known as Spencer X, is an American beatboxer and social media personality. Formerly a street performer, Knight gained popularity on TikTok in 2019 and has become one of the most-followed accounts on the app. He also voiced Sound Effects Smurf in the 2025 film Smurfs.

== Early life ==
Spencer Polanco Knight was born on April 20, 1992, in Manhattan, New York City. Both of his parents are first-generation immigrants; his father is Ecuadorian and his mother is Chinese. They both did not approve of Knight's interest in beatboxing, which began during his sophomore year of high school, when one of his friends beatboxed for him at tennis. He then constantly watched YouTube videos on the topic and of 1980s hip-hop music. He had previous experience in music, playing the trumpet, flute, and drums from middle school. He aspired to become the first celebrity beatboxer, but his parents preferred that he went to college, which Knight did for a year and a half before dropping out. He had studied science at Purchase College and then math at the City University of New York. He began doing street performances in Union Square and taking performing gigs, including with grops such as a bluegrass group, an a cappella quintet, and a Russian rock band.

== Career ==
Knight started his YouTube channel in 2012 and used it as a way to practice his beatboxing skills. That year, he also began competing competitively in beatboxing, reaching the Top 16 in the American Beatbox Championships and getting second in The Midwest Beatbox Battle. He created his TikTok account in February 2019, quickly gaining ten million followers by that fall, when he moved to Los Angeles. Knight only had a few hundred dollars in his bank account at the time of the move and was couch surfing until he began receiving sponsorships from brands such as Uno, Oreo, and Sony. He first thought that his career would work out in August of that year, when he gained thousands of dollars in one evening while using TikTok's livestream feature. In May 2020, he moved to a combination house and studio in Hollywood, where he binged recording over a hundred songs, promoting them on his social media.

In 2021, Knight made a cameo in the film He's All That as the character Karaoke DJ Bryson. By this time, he had also performed at the festivals Warped Tour, Bumbershoot, and the 116th Street Festival. In 2025, Knight had a supporting role as Sound Effects Smurf in the film Smurfs.

== Filmography ==
=== Film ===
| Year | Title | Role | Notes |
|---|---|---|---|
| 2021 | He's All That | Karaoke DJ Bryson | |
| 2025 | Smurfs | Sound Effects Smurf | Voice role |

== Awards and nominations ==
| Year | Award | Category | Result | Ref. |
|---|---|---|---|---|
| 2020 | Streamy Awards | Breakout Creator | Nominated | |
| 2022 | MTV MIAW Awards | Global Creator with Flow | Nominated | |
| 2022 | Nickelodeon Kids' Choice Awards | Favorite Male Creator | Nominated | |
| 2024 | Nickelodeon Kids' Choice Awards | Favorite Male Creator | Nominated | |
