= Hope for Haiti Now (album) =

Live album by Various artists
- Released: January 23, 2010
- Genre: Various
- Length: 78:29
- Label: MTV

Singles from Hope for Haiti Now
- 1. "Stranded (Haiti Mon Amour)" Released: January 23, 2010; 2. "Hallelujah" Released: January 23, 2010; 3. "Lean on Me" Released: January 23, 2010; 4. "A Message 2010" Released: January 23, 2010

Hope for Haiti Now is a live album by various artists to benefit Hope for Haiti Now's campaign to alleviate the 2010 Haiti earthquake. All benefits from the album sales go to Haiti relief organizations, including the Red Cross and Wyclef Jean's Yele Haiti Foundation. Hope for Haiti Now features 19 live performances from the television broadcast Hope for Haiti Now: A Global Benefit for Earthquake Relief as well as the studio version of "Stranded (Haiti Mon Amour)", an original track performed by Jay-Z, Bono, The Edge and Rihanna during the telethon.

The digital-only album was made available for pre-order through iTunes on January 22, 2010. It set a record as the biggest one-day album pre-order in iTunes history. The album sold 171,000 copies in its first weekend and, in merely two days, became the first digital-only album to top the Billboard 200 album chart.

The album has since also become available on Amazon and Rhapsody.

== Track listing ==
No.	Title	Writer(s)	Performer(s)	Length
1.	"Send Me an Angel"	Alicia Keys	Alicia Keys	3:43
2.	"A Message 2010"	Guy Berryman; Jonny Buckland; Will Champion; Chris Martin	Coldplay	4:04
3.	"We Shall Overcome"	Pete Seeger	Bruce Springsteen	2:52
4.	"A Time to Love / Bridge over Troubled Water"	Stevie Wonder; Paul Simon	Stevie Wonder	4:01
5.	"I'll Stand by You"	Chrissie Hynde; Tom Kelly; Billy Steinberg	Shakira featuring The Roots	3:55
6.	"Motherless Child"	traditional	John Legend	4:11
7.	"Hard Times Come Again No More"	Stephen Foster	Mary J. Blige featuring The Roots	3:57
8.	"Breathless"	Kevin Griffin	Taylor Swift	3:51
9.	"Lift Me Up"	Linda Perry	Christina Aguilera	3:45
10.	"Driven to Tears"	Gordon Sumner	Sting	3:34
11.	"Halo"	Evan Bogart; Beyoncé Knowles; Ryan Tedder	Beyoncé featuring Chris Martin	3:31
12.	"Lean on Me"	Bill Withers	Sheryl Crow; Kid Rock; Keith Urban	3:36
13.	"Like a Prayer"	Madonna; Patrick Leonard	Madonna	3:29
14.	"Hallelujah"	Leonard Cohen	Justin Timberlake featuring Matt Morris; Charlie Sexton	4:15
15.	"Let It Be"	John Lennon; Paul McCartney	Jennifer Hudson featuring The Roots	3:53
16.	"Many Rivers to Cross"	Jimmy Cliff	Emeline Michel	3:01
17.	"Stranded (Haiti Mon Amour)" (live version)	Shawn Carter; Paul Hewson; David Evans; Rihanna; Kasseem Dean	Jay-Z; Bono; The Edge; Rihanna	4:27
18.	"Alone and Forsaken"	Hank Williams	Dave Matthews featuring Neil Young	3:30
19.	"Rivers of Babylon / Yele" (medley)	Brent Dowe; Trevor McNaughton	Wyclef Jean	3:55
20.	"Stranded (Haiti Mon Amour)" (1.0 version)	Carter; Hewson; Evans; Rihanna; Dean	Jay-Z; Bono; The Edge; Rihanna	4:20
Total length:				78:29

== Chart performance ==
Hope for Haiti Now debuted on the Billboard 200 at number 1, selling 171,000 copies in only two days as Nielsen SoundScan's sales tracking week at the time ended at the close of business each Sunday, thus becoming the first digital-exclusive set to top the tally in Billboard's history. It also became the second independently distributed album to reach the number one spot on the Billboard 200 chart that year (and 13th overall) following Vampire Weekend's Contra. Hope for Haiti Now sold another 143,000 downloads in its second week of release. The album sold 60,000 copies in its first-two days outside the U.S.

== Charts ==
=== Weekly charts ===
Chart (2010)	Peak position
Austrian Albums (Ö3 Austria)	1
Belgian Albums (Ultratop Flanders)	25
Belgian Albums (Ultratop Wallonia)	24
Canadian Albums (Billboard)	1
Danish Albums (Hitlisten)	3
French Digital Albums (SNEP)	1
New Zealand Albums (RMNZ)	9
UK Compilation Albums (Official Charts)	1
US Billboard 200	1

=== Year-end charts ===
Chart (2010)	Position
Canadian Albums (Billboard)	44
US (Billboard 200)	82

== See also ==
- Humanitarian response to the 2010 Haiti earthquake
- We Are the World 25 for Haiti
