= Friend of Mine (Rihanna song) =

2025 single by Rihanna

Single by Rihanna

from the album Smurfs Movie Soundtrack (Music From & Inspired By)
- Released: May 16, 2025
- Genre: EDM; house
- Length: 3:25
- Label: Westbury Road; Roc Nation
- Songwriters: Robyn Fenty; Lee Stashenko; Jon Bellion; Pete Nappi; Elijah Noll; Jason Cornet; Paul Omar Elkan Agyei
- Producers: Fallen; Bellion; Nappi

Rihanna singles chronology
"Lift Me Up" (2022)	"Friend of Mine" (2025)

Music video
- "Friend of Mine" on YouTube

"Friend of Mine" is a song by Barbadian singer Rihanna, released on May 16, 2025, as the second single from the soundtrack to the film Smurfs, in which she voices the character Smurfette. It was produced by Fallen, Jon Bellion, and Pete Nappi.

== Background ==
"Friend of Mine" was created in the summer of 2024, during one of Jon Bellion's writing camps at his vacation home in the Hamptons. As Bellion describes, "It was a bunch of people having a blast, doing a music camp together, jamming on some DJ shit and playing chords and just having fun. And I think that that's probably why it ended up sounding so new. It just felt like a natural thing, with a bunch of guys who like being around each other and want to make great shit." Fallen worked with Bellion on the production for about three days, only focusing on "refining and dialing it in." Bellion described the song as "raw", noting Rihanna "didn't really mix it further than the two track that we sent out." Although he was uncertain that the song would be released, Bellion was impressed by the track's quality considering the short time that it was created. For a few days, he woke up listening to it every morning. He was initially surprised to hear that the song would be featured in the Smurfs film, but came to understand the mass appeal. In an interview with Billboard, Bellion stated:

From a product standpoint, I don't think you get such major chords and such a positive [message] over a dance record that doesn't sound like a kids movie too often. So when do you nail the feel-good, family-friendly, high-taste, deep '90s nostalgia, that can also be played into the kids movie? Shoot it out into the world!

== Composition and lyrics ==
"Friend of Mine" is an Afrobeats, Afro house and Eurobeat-inspired thumping EDM and house track, a notable departure from Rihanna's typical musical style. The production, described as a "pumping sonic backdrop", consists of a propulsive, "tribal" drum beat and synths. Rihanna performs sparse vocals that are processed with Auto-Tune in a manner that creates an echoing, electronic timbre. She sings the refrain: "Ooh, I think the word here is 'déjà vu' / Just met you tonight, but you feel like a friend of mine / Feel like a friend of mine, feel like a friend of mine / Feel like a friend of mine, feel like a friend of mine / How can so familiar be so brand new? / Just met you tonight, but you feel like a friend of mine / Feel like a friend of mine, feel like a friend of mine / Like a friend of mine, feel like a friend of mine".

== Critical reception ==
Danielle Holian of Atwood Magazine praised the chorus ("the refrain folding in on itself like a mantra, warmly repetitive but never stagnant. It's the kind of hook that lives in your head for days, not aggressively catchy, but quietly persistent.") and instrumental ("The beat is elastic and fluid, giving Rihanna ample space to explore textures with her voice. She flits between sung lines and airy harmonies, her delivery featherlight but emotionally grounded. It's less of a vocal showcase and more of a vibe, pure feeling, distilled into rhythm."). She also stated "What's especially clever about 'Friend of Mine' is how it manages to be playful without being twee. There's no forced whimsy here, no faux-childlike innocence. Instead, the track hums with emotional intelligence, celebrating the enduring bond of friendship not just as a plot point in a cartoon, but as a real, resonant theme. There's no irony in Rihanna's delivery, just a sincere, steady joy. That sincerity, rare in today's pop landscape, is part of what makes this track so magnetic." Sophie Caraan of Hypebeast considered it "an ideal inclusion to a summer playlist." Craig Jenkins of Vulture wrote "The Smurfs tracks present a vision of the pop-star-and-animated-character collab that doesn't look to get most of its streams from children screaming for a replay. 'Friend of Mine' reaches that simplicity and repeated phrasing and melody that makes a cut like 'Baby Shark' playroom-platinum-certified, but gets there peeling through American ballroom and European club music. You can read it as a wholesome word on fast friendship or an ode to a party encounter. Like 'Higher Love,' 'Friend of Mine' is catchy enough for the kids but makes sure to wink to Mom and Dad in the back of the room. It suggests a new approach for Rihanna's music in the mom-ionaire era without giving away too much; it raises the age-old question of where R9 is." Pitchfork ranked the song as one of the low points of 2025, assigning it a 2.9 score.

The song was met with mixed reception among fans. Some praised it for the beat, catchiness and appeal to children while others criticized the unexpected musical style and lack of lyricism, with some accusing Rihanna of trolling.

== Music video ==
The music video was released alongside the single. It opens with Rihanna, wearing business attire and carrying a giant daisy as an umbrella, walking toward the Smurfs' village. She steps inside Papa Smurf's house and disappears as she sets foot. The clip then transitions into animation, entering the Smurf world, and sees the Smurfs dancing to the song. The video ends with Rihanna re-emerging from the house.

== Charts ==
Chart performance
Chart (2025)	Peak position
Croatia International Airplay (Top lista)	72
Jamaica Airplay (JAMMS)	9
New Zealand Hot Singles (RMNZ)	16
Peru Anglo Streaming (Monitor Latino)	14
Sweden Heatseeker (Sverigetopplistan)	17
UK Singles (Official Charts)	72
UK Dance (Official Charts)	19
US Bubbling Under Hot 100 (Billboard)	1
US Dance Airplay (Billboard)	32
US Hot Dance/Pop Songs (Billboard)	3
US Pop Airplay (Billboard)	36
US Rhythmic Airplay (Billboard)	23

== Release history ==
Release history
Region	Date	Format(s)	Version(s)	Label(s)	Ref.
Various	May 16, 2025	Digital download; CD; streaming	Original	Westbury Road; Roc Nation	
Italy	May 16, 2025	Radio airplay	Original	Universal	
Various	May 17, 2025	Digital download; streaming	Radio edit; instrumental	Westbury Road; Roc Nation	
United States	May 20, 2025	Contemporary hit radio; rhythmic contemporary radio	Original	Roc Nation	
United States	October 31, 2025	Vinyl	Original	Republic	
