= Natania =

Indian singer-songwriter

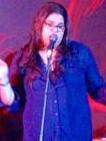
- Born: Natania Ravi Lalwani; October 29, 1992 (age 34); Mumbai, Maharashtra, India
- Occupations: Singer-songwriter; musician
- Years active: 2012–present
- Musical career
- Genre: Pop
- Instruments: Vocals; piano; guitar; ukulele
- Label: Independent

Natania Ravi Lalwani is an Indian pop musician and singer-songwriter.

== Early life ==
Natania is an Indian of Sindhi origin and was born and raised in Mumbai. She went to Cathedral and John Connon school. She finished her education at Jai Hind College, Mumbai. In 2010, she attended The Berklee School of Music's Summer Program in Boston. She then moved to Los Angeles and attended Musician's Institute in Hollywood, California.

== Career ==
=== 2012–2017 ===
Natania began recording her debut EP, Hope and Heartbreak while she was in College. The single was released with an animated-lyric video which received over 30,000 views on YouTube in just a few days. The video then proceeded to air on VH1 India along major label artists like Taylor Swift, One Direction creating a buzz for Lalwani. The EP led to her signing with Urband & Lazaar, a music licensing company in Los Angeles that secured her songs spots on American Television. She then was featured on Music Connection's prestigious "HOT 100 Unsigned Artists" list, which in the past has featured artists like Sara Bareilles and the band, Steel Panther. Hope and Heartbreak was listed in the Top 25 Music Critiques in 2013. Cherry Love also won "Honorable Mention" at the Unsigned Only International Songwriting Competition. Lalwani was part of the top finalists out of 8,000 entries from over 100 countries. Songs from the EP have been featured in commercials for the fashion brand PS I Made This. After her EP she released her single "The Letter". It earned Natania her first GIMA nomination She continued releasing singles like "Box You Up","Prisoner", "Enough" independently getting her recognition on VH1 on It got Time Out Mumbai and Hindustan Times Brunch, Deccan Herald Tadpoles and Miss Malini, (who called Lalwani India's Taylor Swift). Her song charted at no. 35 on VH1's Top 50 videos of 2014 The success of the singles led to Lalwani being an official judge at India's biggest college festivals like Malhar, Kaleidoscope and IIT's Mood Indigo. Natania was chosen out of hundreds of songwriters in America, and was invited to work with Desmond Child at his studio in Nashville in 2016.

=== 2018–present ===
Natania released her single "Mess Me Up" on Lowly Palace and Chill Nation. She then released her single "Yellow Lights". Since Natania has released Kissing Mouths (collaboration with Not Famous), Feelings (Collaboration with Deep Chills) and Muscle Memory.

== Collaborations ==
Natania co-wrote and is the voice of the official Spotify India Launch Ad. She also lent her voice for brands like Nykaa, the Lipton Ad Campaign of 2018 and Lenskart for Katrina Kaif. She co-wrote the theme song for the Amazon Show "Four More Shots Please" and wrote and sang multiple songs for the soundtrack. She co-wrote "When I Was Young" by Neo Noir. Natania penned Music for the official trailer for "Heart Of Man".

== Awards ==
Natania was nominated for a Global Indian Music Academy Award in 2015 for "Best Independent Song"

Lalwani is the season one winner of MTV'S Project Aloft Star India

- Radio City Freedom Awards
  - 2014: Best Pop Artist (People's Choice)
  - 2014: Best Pop Artist
  - 2014: Best New Artist
