= Smurfs (film) =

2025 film by Chris Miller

- Theatrical release poster
- Directed by: Chris Miller
- Written by: Pam Brady
- Based on: The Smurfs by Peyo
- Produced by: Jay Brown; Ty Ty Smith; Rihanna (Note: Rihanna is credited as a producer with her full name, "Robyn Rihanna Fenty".); Ryan Harris
- Starring: Rihanna; James Corden; Nick Offerman; JP Karliak; Daniel Levy; Amy Sedaris; Natasha Lyonne; Sandra Oh; Jimmy Kimmel; Octavia Spencer; Nick Kroll; Hannah Waddingham; Alex Winter; Maya Erskine; Kurt Russell; John Goodman
- Cinematography: Peter Lyons Collister
- Edited by: Matt Landon
- Music by: Henry Jackman (score); Rihanna (score and songs)
- Production company: Paramount Animation
- Distributed by: Paramount Pictures
- Release dates: June 28, 2025 (Brussels); July 18, 2025 (United States)
- Running time: 90 minutes (Note: The theatrical release runtime is 92 minutes, due to being accompanied by a short film, Order Up.)
- Country: United States
- Language: English
- Budget: $58 million
- Box office: $124 million

Smurfs is a 2025 American animated musical fantasy comedy film based on The Smurfs comic book series created by the Belgian comics artist Peyo. A second reboot of The Smurfs film series, the film was directed by Chris Miller and written by Pam Brady. The live-action animated work stars Rihanna, who also produces the film, as the voice of Smurfette, alongside an ensemble cast including James Corden, Nick Offerman, JP Karliak, Daniel Levy, Amy Sedaris, Natasha Lyonne, Sandra Oh, Jimmy Kimmel, Octavia Spencer, Nick Kroll, Hannah Waddingham, Alex Winter, Maya Erskine, Kurt Russell, John Goodman, and Spencer X.

In February 2022, it was reported that Lafig S.A. and IMPS, now known as Peyo Company, the owners of the Smurfs brand, had agreed to a partnership with Paramount Animation to produce multiple animated Smurfs films, with the first project being a musical. Brady was attached to write the screenplay, with production set to begin later that year. By June 2022, Miller had been hired to direct the film, and by April 2023, Rihanna had joined the film as a voice actor and producer, along with writing and recording original songs. Animation services were provided by Cinesite.

Smurfs premiered in Brussels on June 28, 2025, and was released by Paramount Pictures in the United States on July 18. The film received generally negative reviews from critics and grossed $124 million worldwide against a budget of $58 million.

== Plot ==
Years ago, the Intergalactic Evil Wizard Alliance, led by Gargamel's brother, Razamel, attempted to use four magic books to rule the world with evil and destroy all the goodness in the universe. However, Papa Smurf rescues one of the books, Jaunty, and hides her in Smurf Village.

In the present, an unnamed Smurf, dubbed No Name Smurf, is new to Smurf Village. While wandering through a forest, he seemingly gains magic powers by wishing for them. At Smurf Village, No Name shows off his supposed powers to Papa Smurf, causing Razamel to detect Smurf Village and have his henchman Joel send a portal to capture Papa Smurf. No Name, Smurfette, Vanity, Hefty, Worry, Brainy, Grouchy and Turtle set off to find Ken, Papa's brother, heading to Paris, on Earth, to do so.

The Smurfs meet a group called the International Neighborhood Watch Smurfs led by Ken's daughter, Moxie. They lead them to their base hidden inside of a disco ball where they meet Ken who agrees to help them. No Name uses his supposed magic to create a portal to Razamel's castle, where the Smurfs enter. However, a force field installed on the castle bounces them to the portal convergence in the Australian outback. While there, they meet the Snooterpoots, hairy creatures who pickpocket items from multiverse travelers, and Mama Poot, the leader of the Snooterpoots, tells the Smurfs of the Alliance's plan. Feeling awful for causing it, No Name runs away from the Snooterpoots. While Smurfette comforts him, Razamel captures the rest of the Smurfs, as well as the Snooterpoots. Mama Poot, determined to save her children, rallies up No Name and Smurfette and brings them to Munich to stop him.

As Razamel is about to smash Papa Smurf and Smurfette, No Name and Mama Poot enter the room. Jaunty is revealed to be doing the magic for No Name. Joel then captures the three, while Razamel corrupts Jaunty, flying away with her after disowning Gargamel. Angered, he saves the Smurfs, and escapes with them. Papa Smurf comforts the others by sharing his story about his brother Ron, who sacrificed himself to save Jaunty.

Razamel enters a meeting of the Alliance, where he tells them about his evil misdeeds. When they ignore him, he traps them inside a water dispenser and uses the four evil books to rule the universe. However, Gargamel and the Smurfs intervene by crashing into the scene with a flying car. Smurfette reverts Jaunty back to good after most of the other Smurfs are sacrificed. She, No Name and Jaunty jump into an inter-dimensional portal, while Razamel gives chase and recaptures Jaunty. After more self doubt, No Name gains magical powers from within himself, turns the books good again, and defeats Razamel by banishing him into another dimension. Ron emerges from the dimensional door, reuniting with Ken and Papa. No Name, now giving himself the title of Magic Smurf, and the rest of the Smurfs return to Smurf Village to celebrate.

In a mid-credits scene, Razamel is stuck in the unknown dimension with a tardigrade, while Gargamel tells Joel that they have to capture the Smurfs.

== Voice cast ==
- Rihanna as Smurfette, the sole female Smurf
- James Corden as No Name, an unnamed Smurf who discovers magical powers
- Nick Offerman as Ken, Papa's brother
- JP Karliak as Gargamel, an evil wizard bent on capturing the Smurfs
  - Karliak also voices Razamel, an evil wizard who is Gargamel's brother.
- Dan Levy as Joel, Gargamel and Razamel's henchman
- Amy Sedaris as Jaunty, a sentient book
- Natasha Lyonne as Mama Poot, the leader of the Snooterpoots
- Sandra Oh as Moxie Smurf, Ken's daughter
- Octavia Spencer as Asmodius, an intergalactic evil wizard
- Nick Kroll as Chernobog, an intergalactic evil wizard
- Hannah Waddingham as Jezebeth, an intergalactic evil wizard
- Alex Winter as Hefty Smurf
- Maya Erskine as Vanity Smurf
  - Rylan Clark voices Vanity Smurf in the British English version of the film.
- Kurt Russell as Ron, Ken and Papa's brother
- John Goodman as Papa Smurf, the leader of the Smurfs
- Spencer X as Sound Effects Smurf
- Xolo Maridueña as Brainy Smurf
- Marshmello as Turtle
- Hugo Miller as Clumsy Smurf
- Chris Miller as Grouchy Smurf and Camouflage Smurf
  - Jon Richardson voices Grouchy Smurf in the British English version of the film.
- Billie Lourd as Worry Smurf
- Chris Prynoski as Way Back There Smurf and Quiet Smurf
- Rachel Butera as Azrael, Gargamel's pet cat

== Production ==
=== Background and development ===
Paramount Pictures and Nickelodeon Movies had previously attempted to develop an animated Smurfs film with producer Jordan Kerner in the 2000s, until Columbia Pictures and Sony Pictures Animation eventually acquired the film rights for their own live-action/CGI hybrid film in 2011, followed by a sequel in 2013 and a fully animated film, Smurfs: The Lost Village, in 2017.

In February 2022, it was reported that Lafig S.A. and IMPS (now known as Peyo Company), the owners of the Smurfs brand, had agreed to a partnership with Paramount Animation and Nickelodeon Movies to produce multiple animated Smurfs films, with the first project being a musical. Pam Brady was attached to write the screenplay, with production set to begin later that year. In June 2022, it was announced that former DreamWorks Animation veteran Chris Miller had been hired to direct the film. In April 2023, Rihanna joined the cast of the film as Smurfette, as well as serving as a producer along with writing and recording original songs.

The film's title was reported to be The Smurfs Movie, before it was later renamed as The Smurfs Musical. The title was officially revealed as The Smurf Movie during CinemaCon in April 2024. Matt Landon served as co-director. Following the release of the first trailer in February 2025, it was revealed that the film would be simply titled Smurfs, while Nickelodeon Movies dropped out for unknown reasons.

Domain Entertainment financed the film.

=== Casting ===
In April 2024, during CinemaCon, it was announced that Nick Offerman, Natasha Lyonne, J. P. Karliak, Dan Levy, Amy Sedaris, Nick Kroll, James Corden, Octavia Spencer, Hannah Waddingham, Sandra Oh, Alex Winter, Billie Lourd, Xolo Maridueña, Kurt Russell, and John Goodman joined the voice cast. Karliak announced on the day of the trailer's release through social media that he would be voicing both the film's antagonist, Gargamel and his brother Razamel in a dual role.

=== Animation and design ===
Director Chris Miller sought a faithful approach to Smurfs' animation and art design, aiming for a visual style consistent with Peyo's original comics. Production services on Smurfs were handled at Paramount Animation, with animation production provided by Cinesite. Peyo's drawings inspired many of the creative choices taken with the film's look, including the incorporation of action lines and comic thought bubbles, as well as "a fun and buoyant animation style, with plenty of squash and stretch."

The film incorporates various animation styles for its "dimensional sequences", including a two-minute claymation segment created by Screen Novelties. The design of the Snooterpoot characters was inspired by the Wookiees and Ewoks from Star Wars, with their leader, Mama Poot, modeled after Miller's Shih Tzu. When Razamel's character model was created, the production team was concerned he would not be able to run with his small legs. Animation supervisor Jason Ryan and his team took the opportunity and made Razamel's run cycle intentionally comedic.

The members of the Intergalactic Evil Wizard Alliance gained a large amount of visual and story development before the finalized versions, with an example being Ben Affleck being one of the members in early versions of the movie.

== Music ==
=== Soundtrack ===
Smurfs Movie Soundtrack (Music From & Inspired By)

Soundtrack album by Smurfs Cast
- Released: June 13, 2025
- Recorded: 2023–2024
- Length: 38:55
- Label: Roc Nation Distribution
- Producers: David Arkwright; Jon Bellion; Fallen; Pete Nappi; Ethan Roberts; Zeek; The Indian Connect; Soham Mukherji; Riz Sahin; Danja; Fred Hall; DJ Lyan; Donny Flores; Trevor Muzzy; Brandon Riester; Vinny Venditto; Romans

Singles from Smurfs Movie Soundtrack (Music From & Inspired By)
- 1. "Higher Love" Released: February 21, 2025; 2. "Friend of Mine" Released: May 16, 2025

Rihanna wrote and recorded original songs for the soundtrack of the film; on May 16, 2025, she released the song "Friend of Mine" from the soundtrack. another song she recorded, "Anyone", was used on the film but isn't included on the soundtrack. A song from the Indian Connect titled "Higher Calling" was used for another musical sequence for the film that was set in Ken's hideout that was fully animated but was ultimately dropped. Additionally, on February 21, a new song titled "Higher Love" by Desi Trill was released which includes contributions from Cardi B, DJ Khaled, Natania, and Subhi. On May 19, it was revealed that Henry Jackman composed the film's score, having previously collaborated with director Chris Miller on DreamWorks Animation's Puss in Boots (2011). On June 13, Smurfs Movie Soundtrack (Music From & Inspired By) was released via Roc Nation Distribution; the new songs featured contributions from James Fauntleroy, Lous and the Yakuza, Tyla and Shenseea, among others. "Up" from artists Fallon and Felisha was also used for the film but isn't included on the soundtrack. In February 2026, songwriter Romans filed a lawsuit against Paramount claiming the studio used the track “Anyone” without compensating him.

==== Track listing ====
No.	Title	Artist	Length
1.	"Milenge"	Natania	2:51
2.	"Celebrate"	Natania	1:59
3.	"Friend of Mine"	Rihanna	3:25
4.	"Higher Love"	Desi Trill, DJ Khaled, Subhi, Cardi B, & Natania	2:56
5.	"Liar for a Living"	Natania	3:29
6.	"It Takes a Village"	Natania, The Indian Connect	2:19
7.	"Big Dreams"	James Fauntleroy	2:05
8.	"To Me"	Lous and the Yakuza	2:53
9.	"Did We"	Natania	3:14
10.	"Balle Balouza"	Natania, Subhi, The Indian Connect	3:31
11.	"Everything Goes with Blue"	Tyla	2:10
12.	"It's My Party"	Shenseea	2:38
13.	"Always on the Outside"	James Corden; Marshmello	3:20
14.	"Higher Calling"	The Indian Connect	2:05
Total length:			38:55

===== Samples and interpolations =====
- "Higher Love" interpolates "Heaven Is a Place on Earth" (1987), written by Rick Nowels and Ellen Shipley and performed by Belinda Carlisle.

=== Original score ===
Smurfs Movie (Original Motion Picture Score)

Film score by Henry Jackman
- Released: July 18, 2025
- Recorded: 2024–2025
- Length: 48:21
- Label: Roc Nation Distribution
- Producer: Henry Jackman

Henry Jackman chronology
Red One (2024)	Smurfs Movie (Original Motion Picture Score) (2025)	The Bluff (2026)

The original score for the film, composed by Henry Jackman, was released digitally on July 18, 2025, by Roc Nation Distribution.

==== Track listing ====
No.	Title	Length
1.	"The Grimories"	1:17
2.	"Smurf Village"	2:04
3.	"No Name"	3:12
4.	"Razamel"	4:02
5.	"Neighborhood Watch"	1:20
6.	"Kent's Lair"	1:56
7.	"Smurf's Unite"	1:10
8.	"Land of the Snooterpoots"	1:49
9.	"Mama Poot"	1:43
10.	"Charge of the Smurf Brigade"	2:06
11.	"Echoes of the Past"	0:42
12.	"Storming the Castle"	1:36
13.	"A Valiant Effort"	2:00
14.	"One of Us"	1:30
15.	"The Rise and Fall of Gargamel"	1:29
16.	"The Legend of Ron"	2:46
17.	"Guardianeers"	1:30
18.	"Hostile Takeover"	2:04
19.	"Dreams and Nightmares"	1:46
20.	"Identity Crisis"	1:10
21.	"Long Awaited Epiphany"	2:19
22.	"The Comeuppance"	1:46
23.	"An Unexpected Return"	0:56
24.	"The Wizard Part 1"	5:00
25.	"The Wizard Part 2"	2:52
Total length:		48:21

== Release ==
Smurfs had its world premiere in Brussels on June 28, 2025, and was released in the United States on July 18. The film was accompanied by a SpongeBob SquarePants short film, Order Up. Smurfs was originally scheduled for release on December 20, 2024. However, the film was pushed back to February 14, 2025, with Sonic the Hedgehog 3 taking its December 2024 slot, before being delayed to its July date in October 2024. The film's marketing was criticized for overemphasis that "Rihanna is Smurfette", leading to comparisons to the "Zendaya is Meechee" meme that came from the marketing of the film Smallfoot (2018).

=== Home media ===
Smurfs was released on digital platforms on August 12, 2025. The film was released on DVD and Blu-Ray on October 28.

== Reception ==
=== Box office ===
Smurfs has grossed $31.1 million in the United States and Canada, and $93.1 million in other territories, for a worldwide total of $124.1 million. Following its theatrical run, The Hollywood Reporter revealed that the film lost $80 million for Paramount due to going over-budget with Rihanna being blamed and its underperformance played a part in Paramount Animation president Ramsey Naito being laid off in October.

In the United States and Canada, Smurfs was released alongside I Know What You Did Last Summer and Eddington, and was projected to gross $10–12 million from 3,300 theaters in its opening weekend. It went on to debut to $11 million, finishing fourth at the box office. The performance was described by The Hollywood Reporter as in line with "tepid expectations".

=== Critical reception ===
On the review aggregator website Rotten Tomatoes, 21% of 101 critics' reviews are positive, with an average rating of 4.0/10. The website's consensus reads: "Antic and zany without being particularly fun, this incarnation of Smurfs just isn't the smurfest tool in the shed." Metacritic, which uses a weighted average, assigned the film a score of 31 out of 100, based on 27 critics, indicating "generally unfavorable" reviews. Audiences polled by CinemaScore gave the film an average grade of "B+" on an A+ to F scale.

Taylor Williams of Slate Magazine gave the film a rating of 1.5 out of 4, stating that "its pastiche of Into the Spider-Verse is revealed to be nothing more than window dressing". Siddhant Adlakha of IGN gave the film a 6 out of 10, calling it "a movie designed to keep 4-year-olds occupied and adults passively entertained", though says it "doesn't have much to offer beyond its stream-of-consciousness inventiveness." In a three star review for RogerEbert.com, Nell Minow wrote that the film had "plenty to satisfy the long-time fans". She praised Pam Brady's writing for "deftly [balancing] heart, humor, and action", and concluded by stating that "the message about never confusing kindness with weakness is a valuable life lesson and a reminder of why the Smurfs are so enduringly beloved." Betsy Bozdech of Common Sense Media gave the film a 3 out of 5, saying that the film has "positive messages, peril, [and] salty language in smurf-venture."

In a more scathing review, Johnny Oleksinski of New York Post rated the film zero stars out of four, saying that he "Smurf-ing loathed it", and criticized Rihanna's performance for having "all the energy of an automatic voicemail message", and that it was "especially lifeless". Oleksinski also called the Snooter Poots "an annoying new species", and called the tunes "lame and out-of-place", while also saying they were "uncomfortable club beats and eardrum-busting downers". Peter Bradshaw of The Guardian gave the film two stars out of five, writing: "This very uninteresting and uninspired story plods along for an hour and a half, though there are some almost-interesting surreal scenes where our heroes find themselves in weird alt-universe dimensions," and concluded by saying "But there seems to be a worrying assumption here that a film aimed at very little kids doesn't need to have a very interesting or engaging story."

Many critics felt the film was made to capitalize on the Smurfs intellectual property, and described it as "tedious" and "boring". Several reviews also unfavorably compared the film to Trolls (2016).

=== Accolades ===
Accolades received by Smurfs
Award	Date of ceremony	Category	Recipient(s)	Result	Ref.
Nickelodeon Kids' Choice Awards	June 21, 2025	Favorite Song from a Movie	"Higher Love" – Desi Trill, DJ Khaled, Cardi B, Natania and Subhi	Nominated	
Golden Raspberry Awards	March 14, 2026	Worst Prequel, Remake, Rip-off or Sequel	Smurfs	Nominated	
Golden Raspberry Awards	March 14, 2026	Worst Screen Combo	James Corden & Rihanna	Nominated	
iHeartRadio Music Awards	March 26, 2026	Favorite Soundtrack	Smurfs	Nominated	
Nickelodeon Kids' Choice Awards	November 14, 2026	Favorite Female Voice from an Animated Movie	Rihanna	Nominated	
