= Stranded (Haiti Mon Amour) =

Song by Jay-Z, Bono, The Edge and Rihanna

from the album Hope for Haiti Now
- Recorded: January 2010
- Studio: Gang Studios (Paris, France); Roc the Mic Studios (New York, NY); Westlake Recording Studios (Hollywood, CA); Chicago Recording Company (Chicago, IL)
- Length: 4:20 (studio version); 4:27 (live version)
- Label: MTV
- Songwriters: Shawn Carter; David Evans; Paul Hewson
- Producers: Swizz Beatz; Declan Gaffney

"Stranded (Haiti Mon Amour)" is a song recorded by Jay-Z, Bono, The Edge and Rihanna for Hope for Haiti Now, a live album by various artists to benefit the campaign of the same name to alleviate the 2010 Haiti earthquake. The song was written by Jay-Z, The Edge and Bono and produced by Swizz Beatz.

== Background ==
The 2010 Haiti earthquake was a catastrophic magnitude 7.0 M_{w} earthquake, with an epicenter near the town of Léogâne, approximately 25 km (16 miles) west of Port-au-Prince, Haiti's capital. The earthquake occurred at 16:53 local time (21:53 UTC) on Tuesday, 12 January 2010. By 24 January, at least 52 aftershocks measuring 4.5 or greater had been recorded. An estimated three million people were affected by the quake; the Haitian government reported that an estimated 316,000 people had died, 300,000 had been injured and 1,000,000 made homeless. The government of Haiti also estimated that 250,000 residences and 30,000 commercial buildings had collapsed or were severely damaged. The earthquake caused major damage in Port-au-Prince, Jacmel and other settlements in the region. Many notable landmark buildings were significantly damaged or destroyed, including the Presidential Palace, the National Assembly building, the Port-au-Prince Cathedral, and the main jail. Among those killed were Archbishop of Port-au-Prince Joseph Serge Miot, and opposition leader Micha Gaillard. The headquarters of the United Nations Stabilization Mission in Haiti (MINUSTAH), located in the capital, collapsed, killing many, including the Mission's Chief, Hédi Annabi.

Many countries responded to appeals for humanitarian aid, pledging funds and dispatching rescue and medical teams, engineers and support personnel. Communication systems, air, land, and sea transport facilities, hospitals, and electrical networks had been damaged by the earthquake, which hampered rescue and aid efforts; confusion over who was in charge, air traffic congestion, and problems with prioritisation of flights further complicated early relief work. Port-au-Prince's morgues were overwhelmed with tens of thousands of bodies. These had to be buried in mass graves. As rescues tailed off, supplies, medical care and sanitation became priorities. Delays in aid distribution led to angry appeals from aid workers and survivors, and looting and sporadic violence were observed. On 22 January the United Nations noted that the emergency phase of the relief operation was drawing to a close, and on the following day the Haitian government officially called off the search for survivors.

== Writing and recording ==
The genesis of the song came with Jay-Z collaborator Swizz Beatz sending simultaneous text messages to Jay-Z and Bono. They agreed to collaborate on a single, and Bono wrote the hook for "Stranded" while on the phone with Beatz. The latter said, "The idea of the song is 'We're not gonna leave you stranded' and that's what the chorus is. So me and Bono started going back and forth with ideas, and he was like, 'You know this word stranded keeps standing out to me' and I asked him to sing it, and he put me on hold 'cause he's recording the ideas on a Dictaphone — so he did it there and then on the phone." Bono and The Edge then did further writing work on it together.

The recording was done over diverse geographic locations and melded together, with The Edge helping out with extra production work. Beatz then added Rihanna into the effort, later saying, "I knew that Jay would be able to tell a story, and that Bono would be able to sing and bring it home. The last component that I added was Rihanna, and she's kinda like the angel that's on the track, softening it up and giving it that caring feeling, because this hook is so powerful." The final recording was produced by Beatz and Declan Gaffney. In the song, Jay-Z narrates the tale, invoking questions of religion and government while urging action and resolve. Bono and Rihanna sing the vocal hook, with Rihanna taking the lead.

== Promotion and release ==
"Stranded (Haiti Mon Amour)" was debuted and first performed live in London on 22 January 2010, and was shown hours later as part of the Hope for Haiti Now: A Global Benefit for Earthquake Relief telethon. The performance also featured The Edge on guitar and was one of the more upbeat ones of the event.

"Stranded (Haiti Mon Amour)" was released to the UK iTunes Store on 23 January 2010. All profits from the sales will go towards the Hope For Haiti Now campaign. It is Rihanna's second charity single for the Haiti campaign (a take on "Redemption Song" being the first). Also, an album Hope for Haiti Now, including the live performance and the studio version, was released to iTunes on the same date.

== Critical reception ==
The New York Times felt that the artists behind "Stranded (Haiti Mon Amour)" deserved credit for creating an original song for the occasion but that the results were of mixed quality: "The sound was muddy, and the concept undercooked, but it was an implicit acknowledgment that a situation this dire demanded something more than squeezing meaning out of a pre-existing song that lacks it." Ann Powers of the Los Angeles Times said the song's performance was the most newsworthy of the event, and described its musical flavoring as partly derived from the 1995 U2 side project Passengers and partly derived from modern rap. The Hartford Courant described it as the most high-powered combination of the telethon, but said that Bono did not seem fully integrated into the performance.

== Chart performance ==
On 27 January 2010, the song debuted on the Norwegian Singles Chart at number six. It also debuted at number 16 on the Billboard Hot 100 chart, and number six on the Canadian Hot 100. On 28 January 2010, 'Stranded (Haiti Mon Amour)' debuted on the Irish Singles Chart at number three. The following day, the song made yet another appearance, this time on the Swedish Singles Chart same at number three. On 31 January 2010, the song entered the UK Singles Chart at number 41 and UK Indie Chart at number three. It has also made appearances on the Belgian Singles Charts, Danish Singles Chart, Finnish Singles Chart and Spanish Singles Chart with all of the positions currently peaking within the top 40.

== Charts ==
Chart (2010)	Peak position
Austria (Ö3 Austria Top 40)	10
Belgium (Ultratop 50 Flanders)	39
Canada Hot 100 (Billboard)	6
Denmark (Tracklisten)	36
European Hot 100 Singles (Billboard)	26
Finland (Suomen virallinen lista)	14
Ireland (IRMA)	3
Italy (FIMI)	10
Italy Airplay (EarOne)	24
Norway (VG-lista)	6
Spain (Promusicae)	30
Sweden (Sverigetopplistan)	3
UK Singles (Official Charts)	41
US Billboard Hot 100	16
