= Emeline Michel =

Haitian singer

Emeline Michel, born in Gonaïves, is a Haitian singer who has been called "The Joni Mitchell of Haiti." Her songs merge native Haitian compas and rara music with jazz, pop, bossa nova, and samba. She is a well accomplished dancer, versatile vocalist, songwriter and producer. She sang a version of Jimmy Cliff's "Many Rivers to Cross" at Hope for Haiti Now: A Global Benefit for Earthquake Relief.

== Photos ==
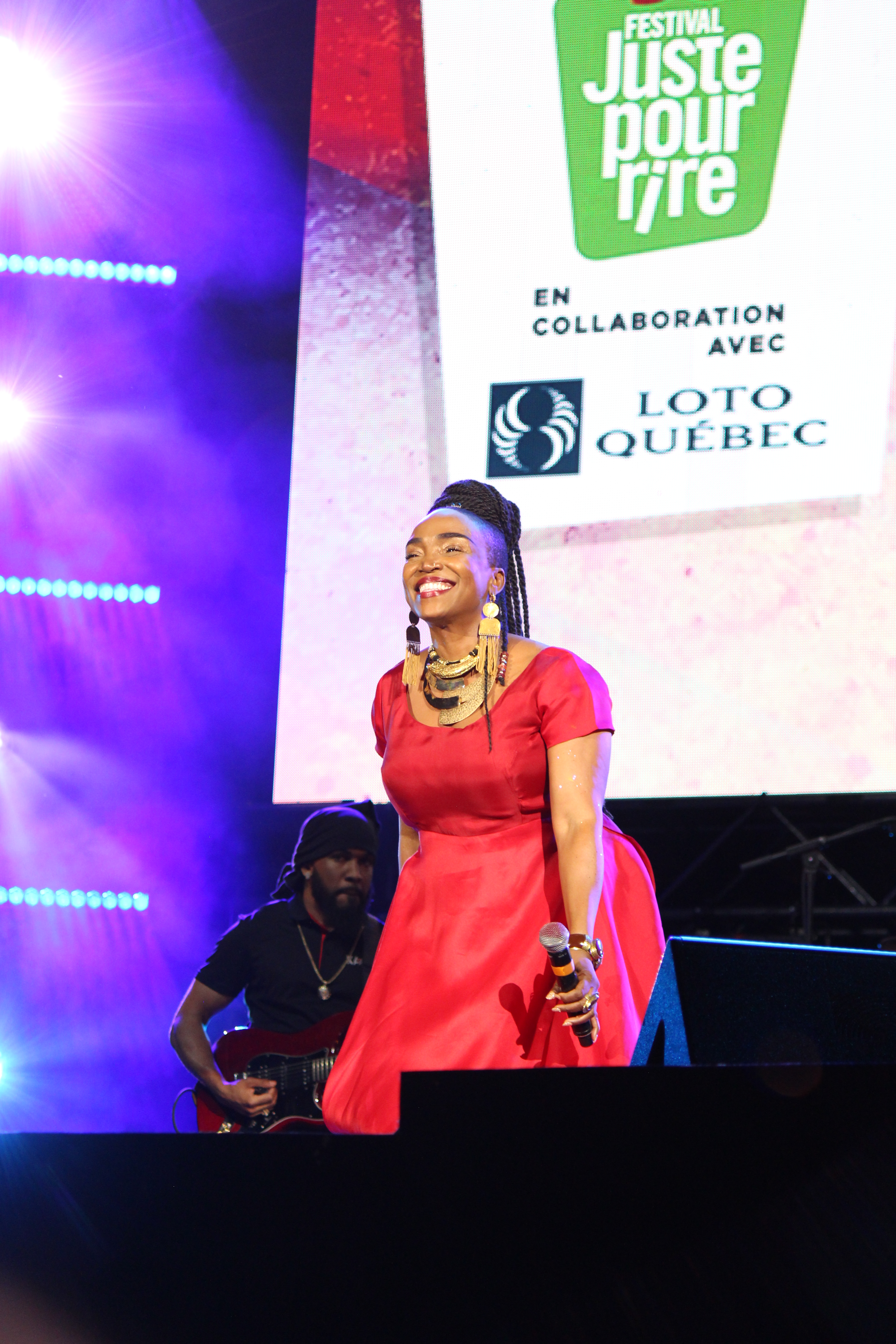
Émeline Michel at the 2019 Haiti En Folie and Just For Laughs festivals in Montréal (1/4)

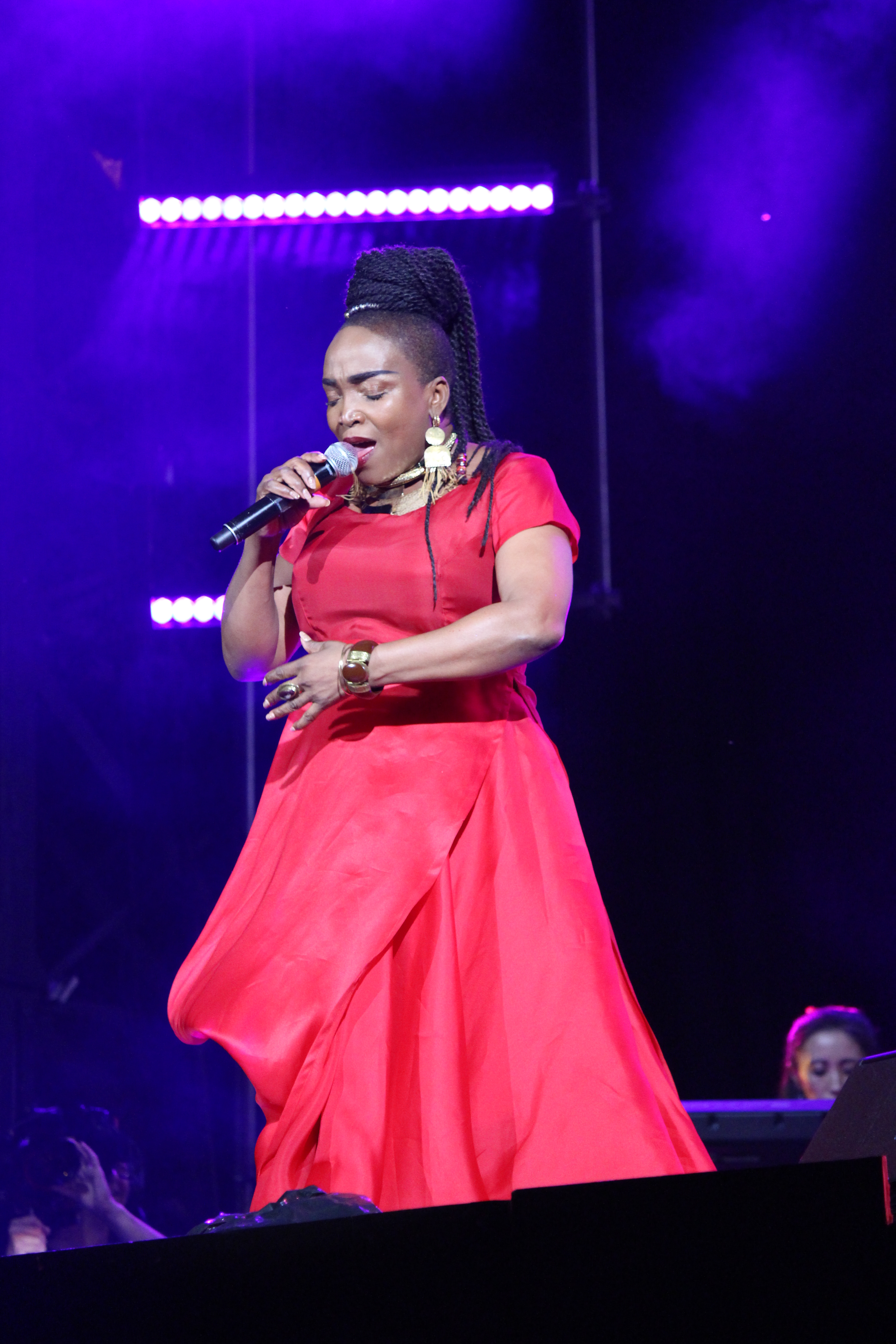
Émeline Michel at the 2019 Haiti En Folie and Just For Laughs festivals in Montréal (2/4)

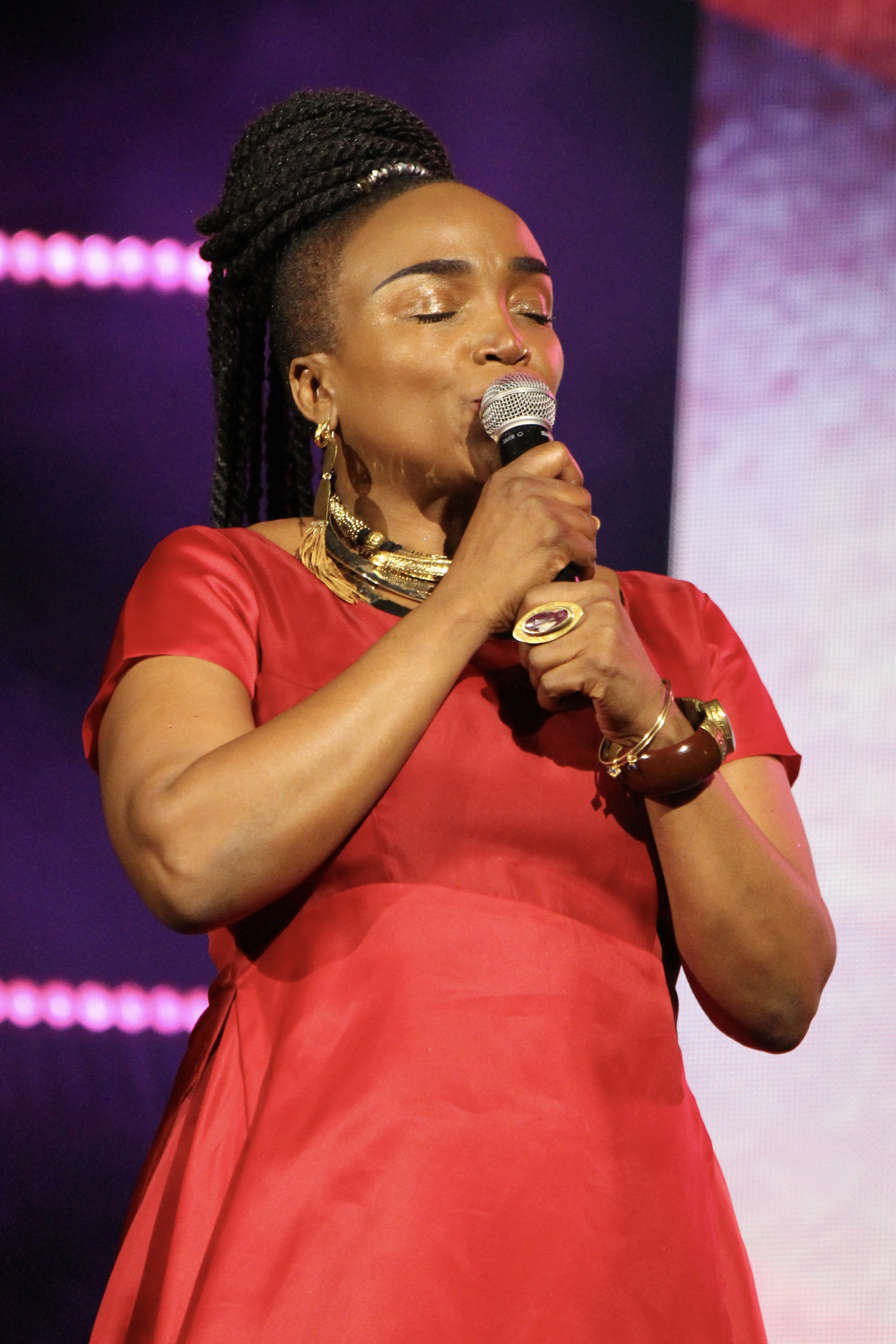
Émeline Michel at the 2019 Haiti En Folie and Just For Laughs festivals in Montréal (3/4)

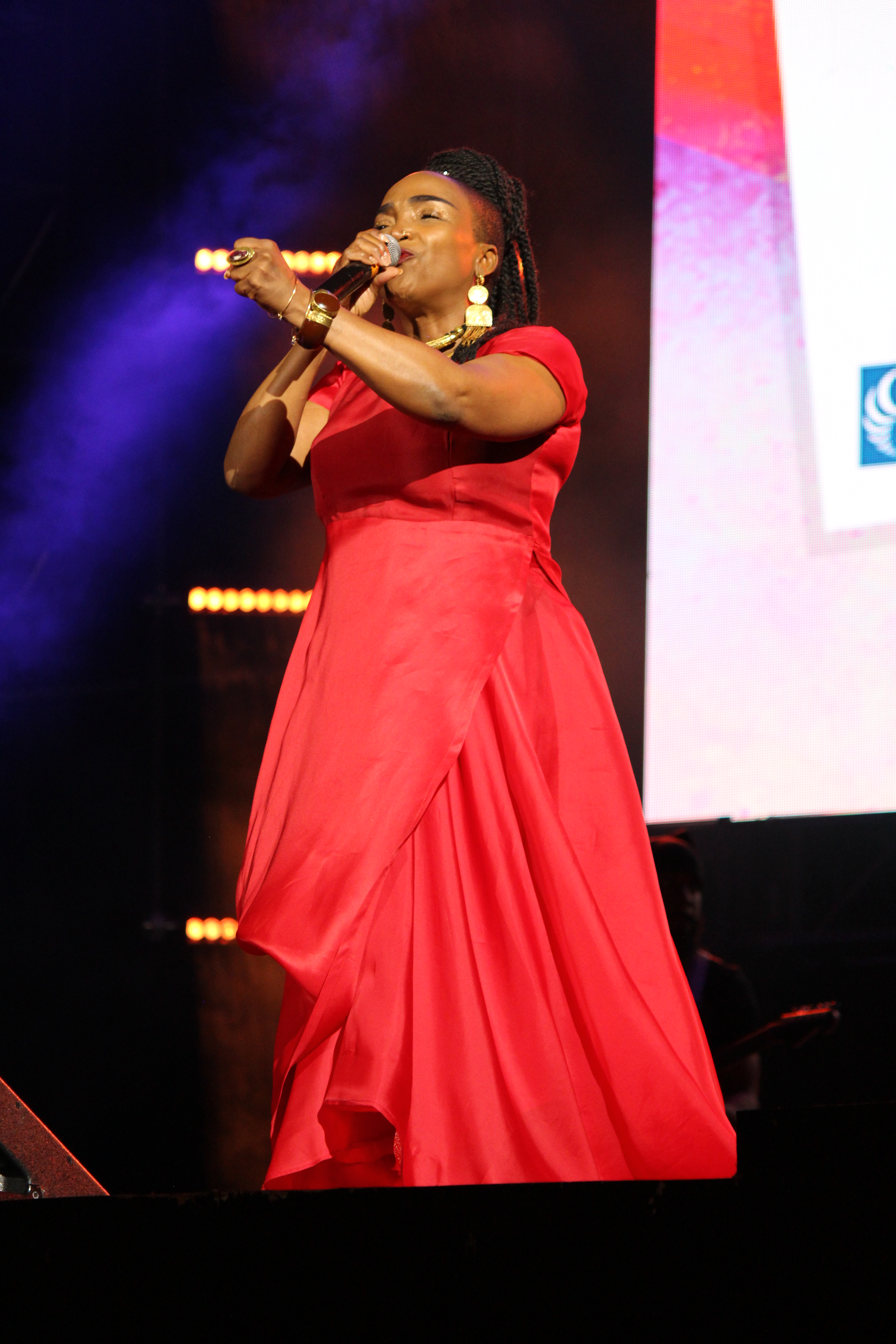
Émeline Michel at the 2019 Haiti En Folie and Just For Laughs festivals in Montréal (4/4)

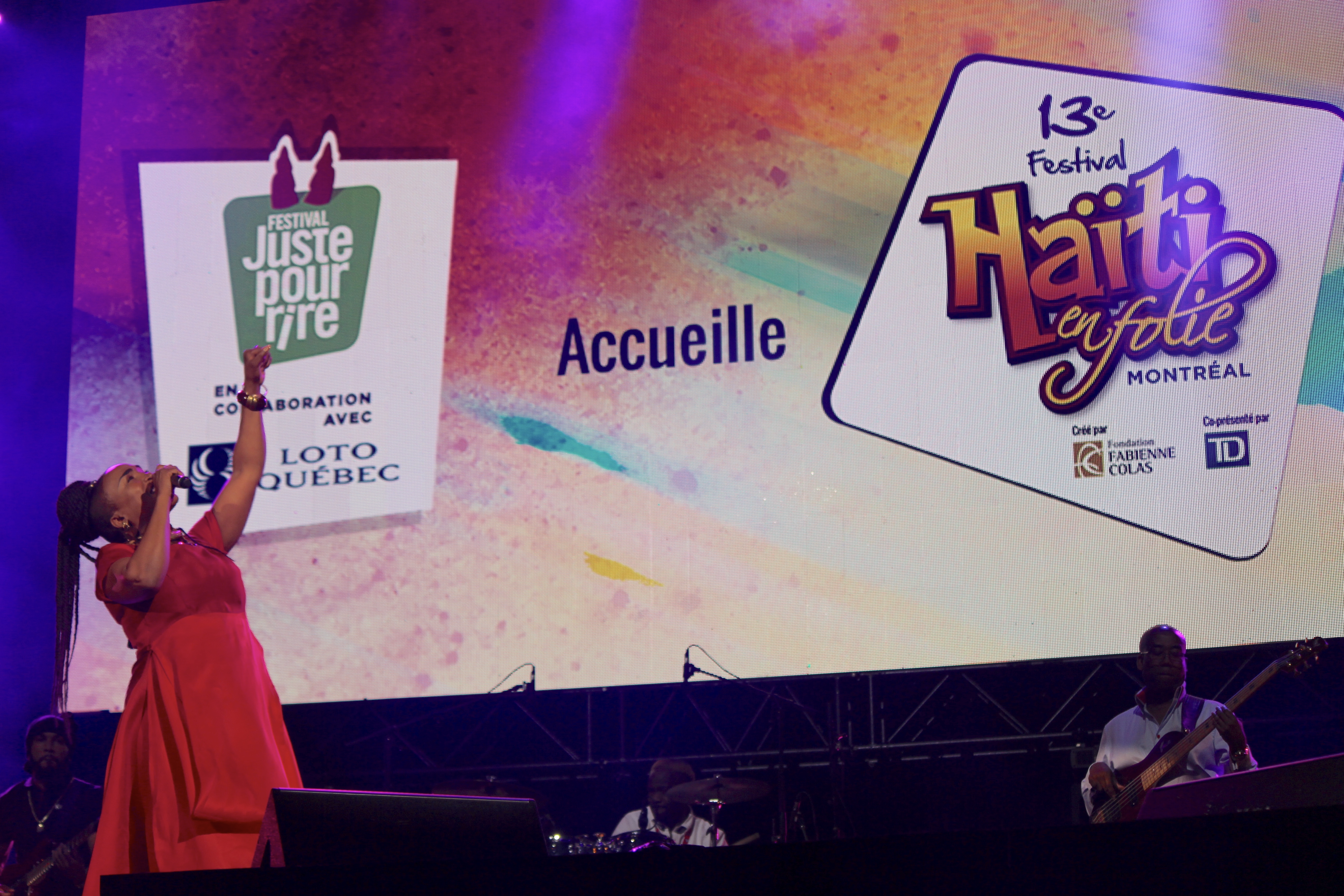
Émeline Michel at the 2019 Haiti En Folie Festival in Montréal (1/3)

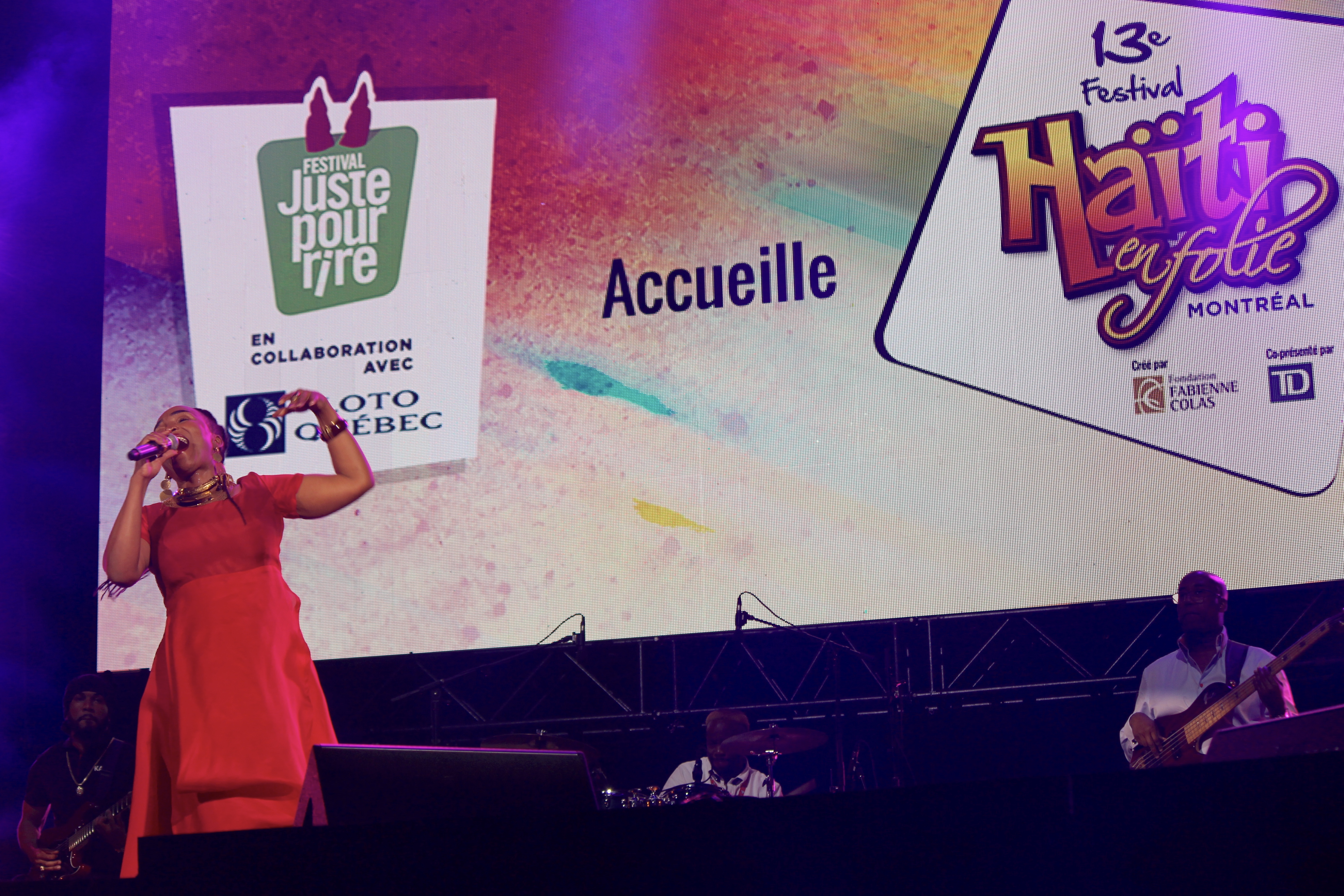
Émeline Michel at the 2019 Haiti En Folie Festival in Montréal (2/3)

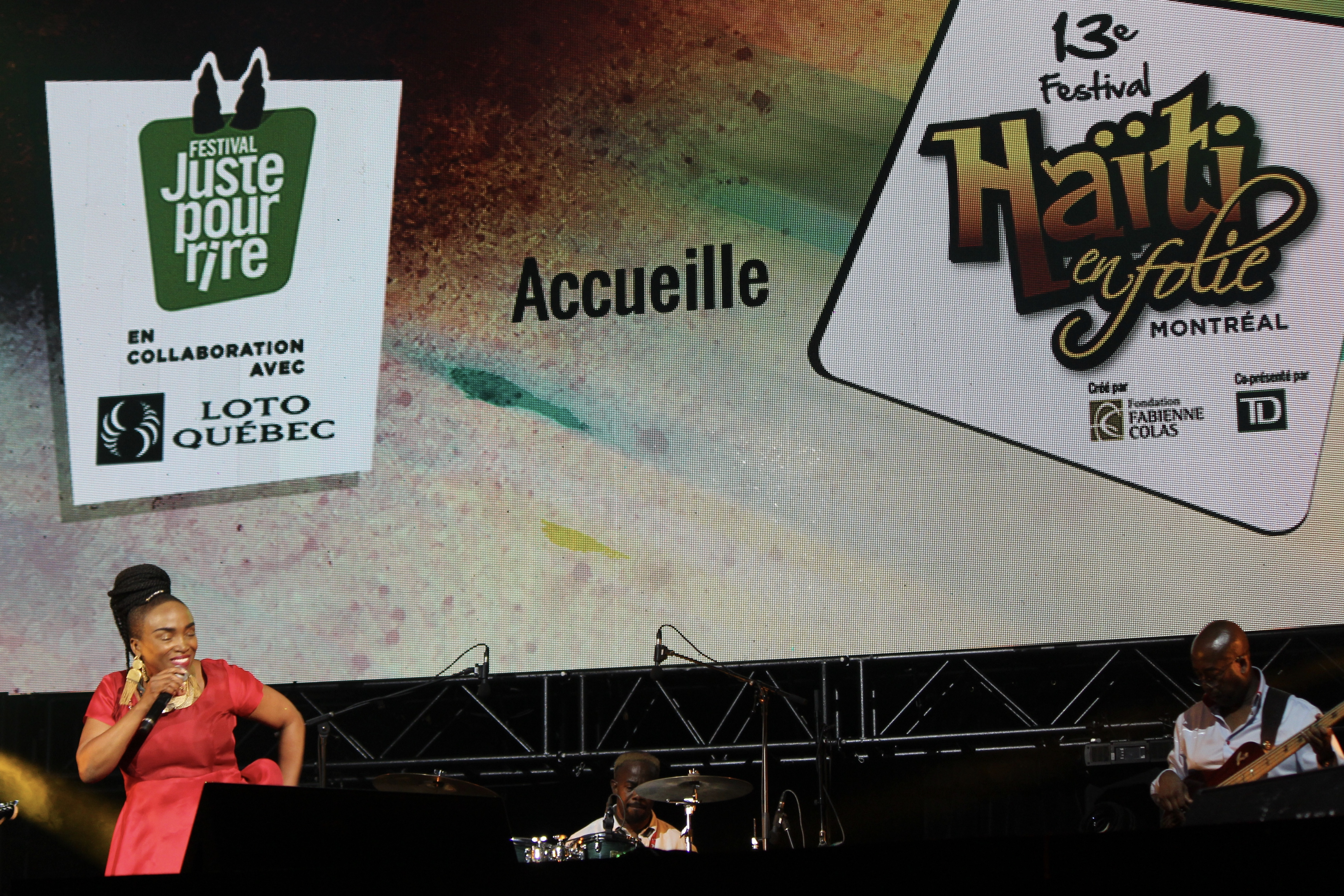
Émeline Michel at the 2019 Haiti En Folie Festival in Montréal (3/3)
