= List of awards and nominations received by Rihanna =

Rihanna awards and nominations
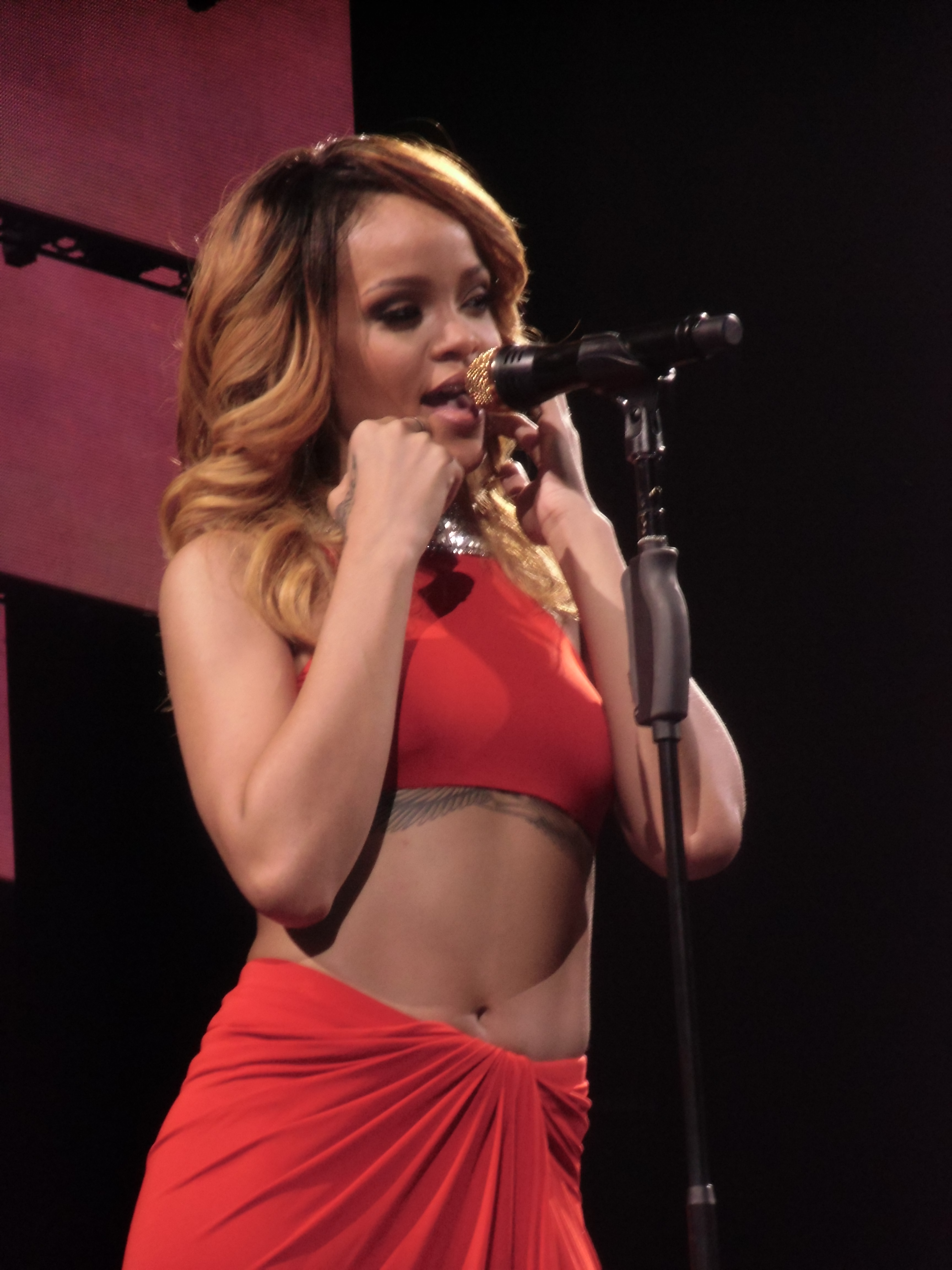
- Rihanna performing during the Diamonds World Tour in 2013
Awards and nominations
Award	Wins	Nominations
American Music Awards	13	26
Billboard	12	66
Golden Globe	0	1
Grammy	9	34
MTV Europe	4	25
MTV VMA	7	31
Much	3	18
NRJ	2	16
People's Choice	4	18
Soul Train	3	19
Teen Choice	4	55
Academy Awards	0	1
Emmy Awards	0	1

Totals (Note: Certain award groups do not simply award one winner. They acknowledge several different recipients, have runners-up, and have third place. Since this is a specific recognition and is different from losing an award, runner-up mentions are considered wins in this award tally. For simplification and to avoid errors, each award in this list has been presumed to have had a prior nomination.)
- Wins: 185
- Nominations: 480

Barbadian singer Rihanna has received multiple awards and nominations for her works in music, film, and fashion. Her music awards are predominantly in pop, R&B, and hip-hop genre categories.

Rihanna's first single, "Pon de Replay" led her to win five awards, following her achieving further accolades for both herself and her debut album, Music of the Sun (2005). Her second album, A Girl Like Me (2006), earned the singer more awards and nominations. Rihanna's third studio album, Good Girl Gone Bad (2007), became Rihanna's breakout album, with the singer receiving a string of awards and nominations in newer categories such as pop and R&B genres. The lead single, "Umbrella" earned Rihanna her first Grammy Award in 2008, while the album's singles and DVD earned a further eight nominations throughout 2008 and 2009. It was named 'Song of the Decade' at the Barbados Music Awards in 2010. Rated R (2009), Rihanna's fourth studio effort, produced the single "Rude Boy" which became the main provider of awards and nominations from the album. It was nominated for 'Song of the Year' at the MTV Europe Music Awards.

In 2010, Rihanna's collaboration with Jay-Z and Kanye West, "Run This Town" won Rihanna her second and third Grammy Awards for Best Rap Song and Best Rap/Sung Collaboration. Rihanna released her fifth studio album, Loud in 2010. It received many nominations including two Grammys for Album of the Year and Best Pop Vocal Album. Furthermore, its lead single, "Only Girl (In the World)" won Best Dance Recording, while the second single "What's My Name?" received a nomination in the same category. Also in 2011, Rihanna collaborated on the worldwide hit single "Love the Way You Lie" with Eminem. The song earned a string of nominations and awards including being nominated for six Billboard Music Awards and three Grammy Awards. Kanye West's single "All of the Lights", released in 2011 and featuring Rihanna as a credited artist, was nominated for three awards at the 2012 Grammy Awards, ultimately winning Best Rap Song and Best Rap/Sung Collaboration. Rihanna released her sixth studio album, Talk That Talk in 2011, earning the singer an American Music Award. Its lead single, "We Found Love" was nominated for many awards, most notably winning the MTV Video Music Award for Video of the Year in 2012 and Best Short Form Music Video at the 55th Grammy Awards in 2013. Two further releases from the album, the title track featuring Jay-Z and "Where Have You Been" also received Grammy nominations. Unapologetic (2012), Rihanna's seventh studio album, produced the lead single "Diamonds" which gained the singer several awards and nominations.

Rihanna has won 9 Grammy Awards, 12 Billboard Music Awards, 13 American Music Awards (including the Icon Award), and 7 MTV Video Music Awards (including the Michael Jackson Video Vanguard Award).

== Awards and nominations ==
Name of the award ceremony, year presented, award category, the nominee of the award, and the result of the nomination
Award ceremony	Year	Nominee(s) / Work(s)	Category	Result	Ref.
Academy Awards	2023	"Lift Me Up"	Best Original Song	Nominated	
American Music Awards	2007	Rihanna	Favorite Soul/R&B Female Artist	Won	
American Music Awards	2008	Rihanna	Favorite Pop/Rock Female Artist	Won	
American Music Awards	2008	Rihanna	Favorite Soul/R&B Female Artist	Won	
American Music Awards	2010	Rihanna	Favorite Soul/R&B Female Artist	Won	
American Music Awards	2011	Loud	Favorite Pop/Rock Album	Nominated	
American Music Awards	2011	Loud	Favorite Soul/R&B Album	Won	
American Music Awards	2011	Rihanna	Favorite Soul/R&B Female Artist	Nominated	
American Music Awards	2012	Rihanna	Artist of the Year	Nominated	
American Music Awards	2012	Rihanna	Favorite Soul/R&B Female Artist	Nominated	
American Music Awards	2012	Rihanna	Favorite Pop/Rock Female Artist	Nominated	
American Music Awards	2012	Talk That Talk	Favorite Soul/R&B Album	Won	
American Music Awards	2013	Rihanna	Icon Award	Won	
American Music Awards	2013	Rihanna	Artist of the Year	Nominated	
American Music Awards	2013	Rihanna	Favorite Pop/Rock Female Artist	Nominated	
American Music Awards	2013	Rihanna	Favorite Soul/R&B Female Artist	Won	
American Music Awards	2013	Unapologetic	Favorite Soul/R&B Album	Nominated	
American Music Awards	2015	Rihanna	Favorite Soul/R&B Female Artist	Won	
American Music Awards	2015	"FourFiveSeconds" (with Kanye West and Paul McCartney)	Collaboration of the Year	Nominated	
American Music Awards	2016	Rihanna	Artist of the Year	Nominated	
American Music Awards	2016	Rihanna	Favorite Pop/Rock Female Artist	Nominated	
American Music Awards	2016	Rihanna	Favorite Soul/R&B Female Artist	Won	
American Music Awards	2016	"Work" (ft. Drake)	Collaboration of the Year	Nominated	
American Music Awards	2016	"Work" (ft. Drake)	Video of the Year	Nominated	
American Music Awards	2016	"Work" (ft. Drake)	Favorite Soul/R&B Song	Won	
American Music Awards	2016	Anti	Favorite Soul/R&B Album	Won	
American Music Awards	2017	Rihanna	Favorite Pop/Rock Female Artist	Nominated	
American Music Awards	2017	Rihanna	Favorite Soul/R&B Female Artist	Nominated	
American Music Awards	2018	Rihanna	Favorite Female Artist – Soul/R&B	Won	
ARIA Music Awards	2011	Rihanna	Most Popular International Artist	Nominated	
BET Awards	2006	Rihanna	Best New Artist	Nominated	
BET Awards	2008	Rihanna	Best Female R&B Artist	Nominated	
BET Awards	2009	"Live Your Life" (with T.I.)	Video of the Year	Nominated	
BET Awards	2009	"Live Your Life" (with T.I.)	Best Collaboration	Nominated	
BET Awards	2009	"Live Your Life" (with T.I.)	Viewer's Choice Award	Won	
BET Awards	2010	"Run This Town" (with Jay-Z & Kanye West)	Video of the Year	Nominated	
BET Awards	2010	Rihanna	Best Female R&B Artist	Nominated	
BET Awards	2010	"Hard" (ft. Young Jeezy)	Viewer's Choice Award	Won	
BET Awards	2011	Rihanna	Best Female R&B Artist	Won	
BET Awards	2011	"What's My Name?" (ft. Drake)	Viewer's Choice Award	Nominated	
BET Awards	2011	"What's My Name?" (ft. Drake)	Best Collaboration	Nominated	
BET Awards	2011	"All of the Lights" (with Kanye West)	Best Collaboration	Nominated	
BET Awards	2012	Rihanna	Best Female R&B Artist	Nominated	
BET Awards	2013	"Diamonds"	Video of the Year	Nominated	
BET Awards	2013	"Diamonds"	Coca-Cola Viewers Choice Award	Nominated	
BET Awards	2013	Rihanna	Best Female R&B Artist	Won	
BET Awards	2014	Rihanna	Best Female R&B Artist	Nominated	
BET Awards	2015	Rihanna	Best Female R&B Artist	Nominated	
BET Awards	2016	Rihanna	Best Female R&B/Pop Artist	Nominated	
BET Awards	2016	"Work" (ft. Drake)	Viewer's Choice Award	Nominated	
BET Awards	2016	"Work" (ft. Drake)	Best Collaboration	Won	
BET Awards	2016	"Work" (ft. Drake)	Video of the Year	Nominated	
BET Awards	2016	"Bitch Better Have My Money"	Centric Award	Nominated	
BET Awards	2017	Rihanna	Best Female R&B/Pop Artist	Nominated	
BET Awards	2018	Rihanna	Best Female R&B/Pop Artist	Nominated	
BET Awards	2018	"Wild Thoughts" (with DJ Khaled & Bryson Tiller)	Video of the Year	Nominated	
BET Awards	2018	"Wild Thoughts" (with DJ Khaled & Bryson Tiller)	Viewer's Choice	Nominated	
BET Awards	2018	"Wild Thoughts" (with DJ Khaled & Bryson Tiller)	Best Collaboration	Won	
BET Awards	2018	"Loyalty" (with Kendrick Lamar)	Best Collaboration	Nominated	
BET Awards	2023	"Lift Me Up"	Bet her Award	Nominated	
BET Hip-Hop Awards	2009	"Live Your Life" (with T.I.)	Track of the Year	Nominated	
BET Hip-Hop Awards	2009	"Live Your Life" (with T.I.)	Best Hip-Hop Collaboration	Won	
BET Hip-Hop Awards	2009	"Live Your Life" (with T.I.)	Best Hip-Hop Video	Won	
BET Hip-Hop Awards	2010	"Run This Town" (with Jay-Z & Kanye West)	Best Hip-Hop Video	Nominated	
BET Hip-Hop Awards	2011	"All of the Lights" (with Kanye West)	Best Hip-Hop Video	Nominated	
BET Hip-Hop Awards	2011	"Love the Way You Lie" (with Eminem)	Best Hip-Hop Video	Nominated	
BET Hip-Hop Awards	2011	"All of the Lights" (with Kanye West)	Verizon People's Champ Award (Viewers' Choice)	Nominated	
BET Hip-Hop Awards	2017	"Wild Thoughts" (with DJ Khaled & Bryson Tiller)	Single of the Year	Nominated	
BET Hip-Hop Awards	2017	"Wild Thoughts" (with DJ Khaled & Bryson Tiller)	Best Hip-Hop Video	Nominated	
BET Hip-Hop Awards	2017	"Wild Thoughts" (with DJ Khaled & Bryson Tiller)	Best Collabo, Duo or Group	Won	
BET Hip-Hop Awards	2018	"Loyalty" (with Kendrick Lamar )	Best Hip Hop Video	Nominated	
Berlin Music Video Awards	2016	"Bitch Better Have My Money"	Best Narrative	Nominated	
Billboard Music Awards	2006	Rihanna	Female Artist of the Year	Won	
Billboard Music Awards	2006	Rihanna	Pop 100 Artist of the Year	Won	
Billboard Music Awards	2006	Rihanna	Female Hot 100 Artist of the Year	Won	
Billboard Music Awards	2011	Rihanna	Top Artist	Nominated	
Billboard Music Awards	2011	Rihanna	Top Female Artist	Won	
Billboard Music Awards	2011	Rihanna	Top R&B Artist	Nominated	
Billboard Music Awards	2011	Rihanna	Top Hot 100 Artist	Nominated	
Billboard Music Awards	2011	Rihanna	Top Dance Artist	Nominated	
Billboard Music Awards	2011	Rihanna	Top Social Artist	Nominated	
Billboard Music Awards	2011	Rihanna	Top Digital Songs Artist	Nominated	
Billboard Music Awards	2011	Rihanna	Top Radio Songs Artist	Won	
Billboard Music Awards	2011	Rihanna	Top Streaming Artist	Nominated	
Billboard Music Awards	2011	Rihanna	Top Digital Media Artist	Nominated	
Billboard Music Awards	2011	Loud	Top R&B Album	Nominated	
Billboard Music Awards	2011	"What's My Name?" (ft. Drake)	Top R&B Song	Nominated	
Billboard Music Awards	2011	"Love the Way You Lie" (with Eminem)	Top Hot 100 Song	Nominated	
Billboard Music Awards	2011	"Love the Way You Lie" (with Eminem)	Top Rap Song	Won	
Billboard Music Awards	2011	"Love the Way You Lie" (with Eminem)	Top Digital Song	Nominated	
Billboard Music Awards	2011	"Love the Way You Lie" (with Eminem)	Top Radio Song	Nominated	
Billboard Music Awards	2011	"Love the Way You Lie" (with Eminem)	Top Streaming Song (Audio)	Nominated	
Billboard Music Awards	2011	"Love the Way You Lie" (with Eminem)	Top Streaming Song (Video)	Nominated	
Billboard Music Awards	2012	Rihanna	Top Artist	Nominated	
Billboard Music Awards	2012	Rihanna	Top Female Artist	Nominated	
Billboard Music Awards	2012	Rihanna	Top R&B Artist	Nominated	
Billboard Music Awards	2012	Rihanna	Top Pop Artist	Nominated	
Billboard Music Awards	2012	Rihanna	Top Hot 100 Artist	Nominated	
Billboard Music Awards	2012	Rihanna	Top Dance Artist	Nominated	
Billboard Music Awards	2012	Rihanna	Top Social Artist	Nominated	
Billboard Music Awards	2012	Rihanna	Top Digital Songs Artist	Nominated	
Billboard Music Awards	2012	Rihanna	Top Radio Songs Artist	Nominated	
Billboard Music Awards	2012	Rihanna	Top Streaming Artist	Won	
Billboard Music Awards	2012	Rihanna	Top Digital Media Artist	Nominated	
Billboard Music Awards	2012	Talk That Talk	Top R&B Album	Nominated	
Billboard Music Awards	2012	"We Found Love" (ft. Calvin Harris)	Top Radio Song	Nominated	
Billboard Music Awards	2013	Rihanna	Top Artist	Nominated	
Billboard Music Awards	2013	Rihanna	Top Female Artist	Nominated	
Billboard Music Awards	2013	Rihanna	Top R&B Artist	Won	
Billboard Music Awards	2013	Rihanna	Top Hot 100 Artist	Nominated	
Billboard Music Awards	2013	Rihanna	Top Social Artist	Nominated	
Billboard Music Awards	2013	Rihanna	Top Radio Songs Artist	Won	
Billboard Music Awards	2013	Rihanna	Top Streaming Artist	Nominated	
Billboard Music Awards	2013	Unapologetic	Top R&B Album	Won	
Billboard Music Awards	2013	"Diamonds"	Top R&B Song	Won	
Billboard Music Awards	2013	"Where Have You Been"	Top Dance Song	Nominated	
Billboard Music Awards	2014	Rihanna	Top Female Artist	Nominated	
Billboard Music Awards	2014	Rihanna	Top Touring Artist	Nominated	
Billboard Music Awards	2014	Rihanna	Top R&B Artist	Nominated	
Billboard Music Awards	2014	Rihanna	Top Social Artist	Nominated	
Billboard Music Awards	2014	"The Monster" (with Eminem)	Top Rap Song	Nominated	
Billboard Music Awards	2016	Rihanna	Top Female Artist	Nominated	
Billboard Music Awards	2016	Rihanna	Top R&B Artist	Nominated	
Billboard Music Awards	2016	Rihanna	Billboard Chart Achievement Award	Won	
Billboard Music Awards	2016	Anti	Top R&B Album	Nominated	
Billboard Music Awards	2017	Anti	Top Billboard 200 Album	Nominated	
Billboard Music Awards	2017	Anti	Top R&B Album	Nominated	
Billboard Music Awards	2017	Rihanna	Top Artist	Nominated	
Billboard Music Awards	2017	Rihanna	Top Female Artist	Nominated	
Billboard Music Awards	2017	Rihanna	Top Hot 100 Artist	Nominated	
Billboard Music Awards	2017	Rihanna	Top Radio Songs Artist	Nominated	
Billboard Music Awards	2017	Rihanna	Top Streaming Songs Artist	Nominated	
Billboard Music Awards	2017	Rihanna	Top R&B Artist	Nominated	
Billboard Music Awards	2017	Rihanna	Top R&B Tour	Nominated	
Billboard Music Awards	2017	"Needed Me"	Top Streaming Song (Audio)	Nominated	
Billboard Music Awards	2017	"Needed Me"	Top R&B Song	Nominated	
Billboard Music Awards	2017	"Work" (ft. Drake)	Top R&B Collaboration	Nominated	
Billboard Music Awards	2017	"This Is What You Came For" (with Calvin Harris)	Top Dance/Electronic Song	Nominated	
Billboard Music Awards	2018	Rihanna	Top R&B Female Artist	Nominated	
Billboard Music Awards	2018	Wild Thoughts	Top R&B Song	Nominated	
Billboard Music Awards	2023	Rihanna	Top R&B Artist	Nominated	
Billboard Music Awards	2023	Rihanna	Top R&B Female Artist	Nominated	
Billboard Latin Music Awards	2011	Rihanna	Crossover Artist of the Year	Nominated	
Billboard Latin Music Awards	2012	Rihanna	Crossover Artist of the Year	Nominated	
Billboard Latin Music Awards	2013	Rihanna	Crossover Artist of the Year	Won	
Billboard Latin Music Awards	2016	Rihanna	Crossover Artist of the Year	Nominated	
Billboard Latin Music Awards	2017	Rihanna	Crossover Artist of the Year	Nominated	
Billboard Touring Awards	2011	Rihanna	Breakthrough	Nominated	
BMI London Awards	2007	"Break It Off" (ft. Sean Paul)	Award-winning songs	Won	
BMI London Awards	2010	"Run This Town" (with Jay-Z & Kanye West)	Award-winning songs	Won	
BMI Pop Awards	2008	"Break It Off" (ft. Sean Paul)	Award-winning songs	Won	
BMI Pop Awards	2012	"Rude Boy"	Award-winning songs	Won	
BMI Pop Awards	2018	"Love on the Brain"	Award-winning songs	Won	
BMI R&B/Hip-Hop Awards	2014	"The Monster"	R&B/Hip-Hop Award Songs	Won	
BMI R&B/Hip-Hop Awards	2014	"Pour It Up"	R&B/Hip-Hop Award Songs	Won	
BMI R&B/Hip-Hop Awards	2016	"Bitch Better Have My Money"	R&B/Hip-Hop Award Songs	Won	
BMI R&B/Hip-Hop Awards	2016	"FourFiveSeconds"	R&B/Hip-Hop Award Songs	Won	
BMI R&B/Hip-Hop Awards	2017	Rihanna	Songwriter of the Year‡	Won	
BMI R&B/Hip-Hop Awards	2017	"Needed Me"	Most Performed R&B/Hip-Hop Songs	Won	
BMI R&B/Hip-Hop Awards	2017	"Love on the Brain"	Most Performed R&B/Hip-Hop Songs	Won	
BMI R&B/Hip-Hop Awards	2017	"Work" (ft. Drake)	Most Performed R&B/Hip-Hop Songs	Won	
BMI R&B/Hip-Hop Awards	2017	"Too Good"	Most Performed R&B/Hip-Hop Songs	Won	
BMI R&B/Hip-Hop Awards	2019	"Lemon"	Most Performed R&B/Hip-Hop Songs	Won	
BMI Urban Awards	2010	"Run This Town" (with Jay-Z & Kanye West)	Award-winning songs	Won	
BMI Urban Awards	2011	"Rude Boy"	Award-winning songs	Won	
Bravo Otto Awards	2011	Rihanna	Super Singer – Female	Won	
Bravo Otto Awards	2012	Rihanna	Super Singer – Female	Won	
Bravo Otto Awards	2013	Rihanna	Rapporteur of the Year – Foreign Woman	Won	
Brit Awards	2008	Rihanna	International Female Solo Artist	Nominated	
Brit Awards	2010	Rihanna	International Female Solo Artist	Nominated	
Brit Awards	2011	Rihanna	International Female Solo Artist	Won	
Brit Awards	2012	Rihanna	International Female Solo Artist	Won	
Brit Awards	2013	Rihanna	International Female Solo Artist	Nominated	
Brit Awards	2013	"Princess of China" (with Coldplay)	British Single of the Year	Nominated	
Brit Awards	2017	Rihanna	International Female Solo Artist	Nominated	
Brit Awards	2017	"This Is What You Came For" (with Calvin Harris)	British Single of the Year	Nominated	
BT Digital Music Awards	2010	Rihanna	Best Event/Nokia Present Rihanna Live	Won	
BT Digital Music Awards	2010	Rihanna	Best International Artist	Nominated	
BT Digital Music Awards	2011	Rihanna	Best International Artist	Nominated	
Canadian Radio Music Awards	2013	Rihanna	International Solo Artist of the Year	Won	
CFDA Fashion Awards	2014	Rihanna	Fashion Icon Award	Won	
Clio Awards	2016	ANTIdiaRy	Best commercial	Nominated	
Clio Awards	2016	ANTIdiaRy	Best partnership	Nominated	
Critics' Choice Awards	2023	"Lift Me Up"	Best Song	Nominated	
Danish Music Awards	2011	"Only Girl (In the World)"	International Hit of the Year	Won	
Danish Music Awards	2011	"Love the Way You Lie" (ft. Eminem)	International Hit of the Year	Nominated	
Danish Music Awards	2012	"We Found Love" (ft. Calvin Harris)	International Hit of the Year	Nominated	
Danish Music Awards	2013	"Unapologetic"	International Album of the Year	Won	
Danish Music Awards	2013	"Diamonds"	International Hit of the Year	Nominated	
Danish Music Awards	2014	"The Monster" (ft. Eminem)	International Hit of the Year	Nominated	
Echo Music Prize	2008	"Umbrella" (ft. Jay-Z)	Hit of the Year	Nominated	
Echo Music Prize	2008	Rihanna	International Female Artist of the Year	Nominated	
Echo Music Prize	2011	Rihanna	International Female Artist of the Year	Nominated	
Echo Music Prize	2013	"Diamonds"	Hit of the Year	Nominated	
The Fashion Awards	2017	Fenty x Puma by Rihanna	Urban Luxe	Nominated	
The Fashion Awards	2019	Fenty	Urban Luxe	Won	
FiFi Awards	2014	Nude by Rihanna	Best Celebrity Fragrance	Won	
Footwear News Achievement Awards	2016	Fenty Puma Creeper	Shoe of the Year	Won	
GAFFA Awards (Denmark)	2011	"We Found Love"	International Video of the Year	Nominated	
GAFFA Awards (Denmark)	2015	"FourFiveSeconds" (with Kanye West and Paul McCartney)	International Hit of the Year	Nominated	
GAFFA Awards (Denmark)	2016	Rihanna	International Female Artist of the Year	Nominated	
GAFFA Awards (Denmark)	2018	"Wild Thoughts" (DJ Khaled featuring Rihanna and Bryson Tiller)	International Hit of the Year	Nominated	
GAFFA Awards (Sweden)	2010	"Love the Way You Lie" (with Eminem)	International Hit of the Year	Won	
GAFFA Awards (Sweden)	2015	"Bitch Better Have My Money"	International Hit of the Year	Won	
Gaygalan Awards	2018	"Wild Thoughts" (DJ Khaled featuring Rihanna and Bryson Tiller)	International Song of the Year	Nominated	
Glamour Awards	2009	Rihanna	Woman of the Year	Won	
Golden Raspberry Awards	2013	Battleship	Worst Supporting Actress	Won	
Golden Raspberry Awards	2013	Battleship	Worst Screen Ensemble	Nominated	
Golden Raspberry Awards	2026	Smurfs	Worst Screen Combo (Note: shared with James Corden)	Nominated	
Grammy Awards	2008	"Umbrella" (ft. Jay-Z)	Record of the Year	Nominated	
Grammy Awards	2008	"Umbrella" (ft. Jay-Z)	Best Rap/Sung Collaboration	Won	
Grammy Awards	2008	"Don't Stop the Music"	Best Dance Recording	Nominated	
Grammy Awards	2008	"Hate That I Love You" (ft. Ne-Yo)	Best R&B Performance by a Duo or Group with Vocals	Nominated	
Grammy Awards	2009	"If I Never See Your Face Again" (with Maroon 5)	Best Pop Collaboration with Vocals	Nominated	
Grammy Awards	2009	"Disturbia"	Best Dance Recording	Nominated	
Grammy Awards	2009	Good Girl Gone Bad Live	Best Long Form Music Video	Nominated	
Grammy Awards	2010	"Run This Town" (with Jay-Z & Kanye West)	Best Rap Song	Won	
Grammy Awards	2010	"Run This Town" (with Jay-Z & Kanye West)	Best Rap/Sung Collaboration	Won	
Grammy Awards	2011	"Love the Way You Lie" (with Eminem)	Best Rap/Sung Collaboration	Nominated	
Grammy Awards	2011	"Love the Way You Lie" (with Eminem)	Record of the Year	Nominated	
Grammy Awards	2011	"Love the Way You Lie" (with Eminem)	Best Short Form Music Video	Nominated	
Grammy Awards	2011	"Only Girl (In the World)"	Best Dance Recording	Won	
Grammy Awards	2011	Recovery (as featured artist)	Album of the Year	Nominated	
Grammy Awards	2012	Loud	Album of the Year	Nominated	
Grammy Awards	2012	Loud	Best Pop Vocal Album	Nominated	
Grammy Awards	2012	"What's My Name?" (ft. Drake)	Best Rap/Sung Collaboration	Nominated	
Grammy Awards	2012	"All of the Lights" (with Kanye West, Kid Cudi & Fergie)	Best Rap/Sung Collaboration	Won	
Grammy Awards	2013	"Talk That Talk" (ft. Jay-Z)	Best Rap/Sung Collaboration	Nominated	
Grammy Awards	2013	"Where Have You Been"	Best Pop Solo Performance	Nominated	
Grammy Awards	2013	"We Found Love" (ft. Calvin Harris)	Best Short Form Music Video	Won	
Grammy Awards	2014	"Stay" (ft. Mikky Ekko)	Best Pop Duo/Group Performance	Nominated	
Grammy Awards	2014	Unapologetic	Best Urban Contemporary Album	Won	
Grammy Awards	2015	"The Monster" (with Eminem)	Best Rap/Sung Collaboration	Won	
Grammy Awards	2017	"Work" (ft. Drake)	Record of the Year	Nominated	
Grammy Awards	2017	"Work" (ft. Drake)	Best Pop Duo/Group Performance	Nominated	
Grammy Awards	2017	"Needed Me"	Best R&B Performance	Nominated	
Grammy Awards	2017	"Kiss It Better"	Best R&B Song	Nominated	
Grammy Awards	2017	Anti	Best Urban Contemporary Album	Nominated	
Grammy Awards	2017	Anti	Best Recording Package	Nominated	
Grammy Awards	2017	Views (as featured artist)	Album of the Year	Nominated	
Grammy Awards	2017	"Famous" (with Kanye West & Swizz Beatz)	Best Rap/Sung Performance	Nominated	
Grammy Awards	2018	"Loyalty" (with Kendrick Lamar)	Best Rap/Sung Performance	Won	
Grammy Awards	2024	"Lift Me Up"	Best Song Written for Visual Media	Nominated	
Golden Globe Awards	2023	"Lift Me Up"	Best Original Song	Nominated	
The Headies	2013	"Orezi"	Best Reggae/Dancehall Single	Nominated	
Hollywood Critics Association Creative Arts Awards	2023	"Lift Me Up"	Best Original Song	Nominated	
Hollywood Music in Media Awards	2015	"Dancing in the Dark"	Best Song – Animated Film	Won	
Hollywood Music in Media Awards	2016	"Sledgehammer"	Best Song – SciFi/Fantasy Film	Nominated	
Hollywood Music in Media Awards	2022	"Lift Me Up"	Best Original Song in a Feature Film	Won	
IFPI Hong Kong Top Sales Music Awards	2006	A Girl Like Me	Ten Best Sales Releases, Foreign	Won	
iHeartRadio Music Awards	2014	Rihanna	Artist of the Year	Won	
iHeartRadio Music Awards	2014	Rihanna	Instagram Award	Nominated	
iHeartRadio Music Awards	2014	"Stay" (ft. Mikky Ekko)	Song of the Year	Won	
iHeartRadio Music Awards	2014	"Stay" (ft. Mikky Ekko)	Best Collaboration	Nominated	
iHeartRadio Music Awards	2014	"The Monster" (with Eminem)	Song of the Year	Nominated	
iHeartRadio Music Awards	2014	"The Monster" (with Eminem)	Best Collaboration	Nominated	
iHeartRadio Music Awards	2014	"Pour It Up"	Hip Hop/R&B Song of the Year	Won	
iHeartRadio Music Awards	2014	Rihanna Navy	Best Fan Army	Won	
iHeartRadio Music Awards	2016	"Bitch Better Have My Money"	R&B Song of the Year	Nominated	
iHeartRadio Music Awards	2017	Rihanna	Female Artist of the Year	Nominated	
iHeartRadio Music Awards	2017	Rihanna	R&B Artist of the Year	Nominated	
iHeartRadio Music Awards	2017	Rihanna	Best Fan Army	Nominated	
iHeartRadio Music Awards	2017	Anti	R&B Album of the Year	Won	
iHeartRadio Music Awards	2017	"Too Good" (with Drake)	Best Lyrics	Nominated	
iHeartRadio Music Awards	2017	"Needed Me"	R&B Song of the Year	Nominated	
iHeartRadio Music Awards	2017	"Work" (ft. Drake)	R&B Song of the Year	Won	
iHeartRadio Music Awards	2017	"Work" (ft. Drake)	Best Collaboration	Won	
iHeartRadio Music Awards	2017	"Work" (ft. Drake)	Best Music Video	Nominated	
iHeartRadio Music Awards	2017	"This Is What You Came For" (with Calvin Harris)	Best Music Video	Nominated	
iHeartRadio Music Awards	2017	"This Is What You Came For" (with Calvin Harris)	Best Collaboration	Nominated	
iHeartRadio Music Awards	2018	"Wild Thoughts" (with DJ Khaled & Bryson Tiller)	Best Collaboration	Nominated	
iHeartRadio Music Awards	2018	"Wild Thoughts" (with DJ Khaled & Bryson Tiller)	Song of the Year	Nominated	
iHeartRadio Music Awards	2018	"Wild Thoughts" (with DJ Khaled & Bryson Tiller)	Hip-Hop Song of the Year	Won	
iHeartRadio Music Awards	2018	Rihanna	Female Artist of the Year	Nominated	
iHeartRadio Music Awards	2018	Rihanna	R&B Artist of the Year	Nominated	
iHeartRadio Music Awards	2023	"Lift Me Up"	Best Lyrics	Nominated	
iHeartRadio Music Awards	2023	Rihanna Navy	Best Fan Army	Nominated	
Japan Gold Disc Awards	2006	Rihanna	International Best New Artist	Won	
Juno Awards	2008	Good Girl Gone Bad	International Album of the Year	Won	
Juno Awards	2012	Loud	International Album of the Year	Nominated	
Juno Awards	2017	Anti	International Album of the Year	Nominated	
La Chanson de l'année	2012	"Diamonds"	Song of the Year	Nominated	
Latin American Music Awards	2016	"This Is What You Came For" (with Calvin Harris)	Favorite Dance Song	Won	
Las Vegas Film Critics Society	2023	"Lift Me Up"	Best Original Song	Nominated	
Los Premios 40 Principales	2007	"Umbrella" (ft. Jay-Z)	Best International Song	Won	
Los Premios 40 Principales	2010	Rihanna	Best International Artist	Nominated	
Los Premios 40 Principales	2011	Rihanna	Best International Artist	Nominated	
Los Premios 40 Principales	2011	"S&M"	Best International Song	Nominated	
Los Premios 40 Principales	2012	Talk That Talk	Best International Album	Nominated	
Los Premios 40 Principales	2013	Rihanna	Best International Artist	Nominated	
Los Premios 40 Principales	2013	Unapologetic	Best International Album	Nominated	
Meteor Music Awards	2008	Rihanna	Best International Female	Nominated	
Meteor Music Awards	2009	Rihanna	Best International Female	Nominated	
MOBO Awards	2006	Rihanna	Best R&B Artist	Won	
MOBO Awards	2007	Rihanna	Best International Act	Won	
MOBO Awards	2007	"Umbrella" (ft. Jay-Z)	Best Video	Nominated	
MOBO Awards	2008	Rihanna	Best International Act	Nominated	
MOBO Awards	2010	Rihanna	Best International Act	Nominated	
MOBO Awards	2011	Rihanna	Best International Act	Won	
MOBO Awards	2012	Rihanna	Best International Act	Nominated	
MP3 Music Awards	2010	"Russian Roulette"	The BFV Award	Nominated	
MP3 Music Awards	2011	"All of the Lights" (with Kanye West)	The HRR Award	Won	
MP3 Music Awards	2011	"Cheers (Drink to That)"	The BFV Award	Nominated	
MTV Movie & TV Awards	2014	This Is the End	Best Cameo	Won	
MTV Movie & TV Awards	2023	"Lift Me Up"	Best Song	Nominated	
MTV Video Music Awards	2006	"SOS"	Viewer's Choice	Nominated	
MTV Video Music Awards	2006	"SOS"	Best New Artist in a Video	Nominated	
MTV Video Music Awards	2007	Herself	Female Artist of the Year	Nominated	
MTV Video Music Awards	2007	"Umbrella" (ft. Jay-Z)	Video of the Year	Won	
MTV Video Music Awards	2007	"Umbrella" (ft. Jay-Z)	Monster Single of the Year	Won	
MTV Video Music Awards	2007	"Umbrella" (ft. Jay-Z)	Best Director	Nominated	
MTV Video Music Awards	2008	"Take a Bow"	Best Female Video	Nominated	
MTV Video Music Awards	2008	"Take a Bow"	Best Direction	Nominated	
MTV Video Music Awards	2009	"Live Your Life" (with T.I.)	Best Male Video	Won	
MTV Video Music Awards	2010	"Rude Boy"	Best Editing	Nominated	
MTV Video Music Awards	2011	"Love the Way You Lie" (with Eminem)	Best Male Video	Nominated	
MTV Video Music Awards	2011	"Love the Way You Lie" (with Eminem)	Best Cinematography	Nominated	
MTV Video Music Awards	2011	"Love the Way You Lie" (with Eminem)	Best Direction	Nominated	
MTV Video Music Awards	2011	"Love the Way You Lie" (with Eminem)	Best Video with a Message	Nominated	
MTV Video Music Awards	2011	"All of the Lights" (with Kanye West & Kid Cudi)	Best Collaboration	Nominated	
MTV Video Music Awards	2011	"All of the Lights" (with Kanye West & Kid Cudi)	Best Editing	Nominated	
MTV Video Music Awards	2011	"All of the Lights" (with Kanye West & Kid Cudi)	Best Hip-Hop Video	Nominated	
MTV Video Music Awards	2011	"All of the Lights" (with Kanye West & Kid Cudi)	Best Male Video	Nominated	
MTV Video Music Awards	2012	"Princess of China" (with Coldplay)	Best Editing	Nominated	
MTV Video Music Awards	2012	"Princess of China" (with Coldplay)	Best Direction	Nominated	
MTV Video Music Awards	2012	"Take Care" (with Drake)	Best Male Video	Nominated	
MTV Video Music Awards	2012	"Take Care" (with Drake)	Best Art Direction	Nominated	
MTV Video Music Awards	2012	"Take Care" (with Drake)	Best Cinematography	Nominated	
MTV Video Music Awards	2012	"Take Care" (with Drake)	Video of the Year	Nominated	
MTV Video Music Awards	2012	"Where Have You Been"	Best Choreography	Nominated	
MTV Video Music Awards	2012	"Where Have You Been"	Best Visual Effects	Nominated	
MTV Video Music Awards	2012	"We Found Love" (ft. Calvin Harris)	Video of the Year	Won	
MTV Video Music Awards	2012	"We Found Love" (ft. Calvin Harris)	Best Pop Video	Nominated	
MTV Video Music Awards	2012	"We Found Love" (ft. Calvin Harris)	Best Female Video	Nominated	
MTV Video Music Awards	2013	"Stay" (ft. Mikky Ekko)	Best Female Video	Nominated	
MTV Video Music Awards	2014	"The Monster" (with Eminem)	Best Collaboration	Nominated	
MTV Video Music Awards	2014	"The Monster" (with Eminem)	Best Direction	Nominated	
MTV Video Music Awards	2014	"The Monster" (with Eminem)	Best Male Video	Nominated	
MTV Video Music Awards	2015	"American Oxygen"	Best Video With A Social Message	Nominated	
MTV Video Music Awards	2016	"Work" (ft. Drake)	Best Female Video	Nominated	
MTV Video Music Awards	2016	"Work" (ft. Drake)	Best Collaboration	Nominated	
MTV Video Music Awards	2016	"This Is What You Came For" (with Calvin Harris)	Best Collaboration	Nominated	
MTV Video Music Awards	2016	"This Is What You Came For" (with Calvin Harris)	Best Male Video	Won	
MTV Video Music Awards	2016	Herself	Michael Jackson Video Vanguard Award	Won	
MTV Video Music Awards	2017	"Wild Thoughts" (with DJ Khaled & Bryson Tiller)	Best Collaboration	Nominated	
MTV Video Music Awards	2017	"Wild Thoughts" (with DJ Khaled & Bryson Tiller)	Video of The Year	Nominated	
MTV Video Music Awards	2017	"Wild Thoughts" (with DJ Khaled & Bryson Tiller)	Best Art Direction	Nominated	
MTV Video Music Awards	2017	"Wild Thoughts" (with DJ Khaled & Bryson Tiller)	Song of the Summer	Nominated	
MTV Video Music Awards	2018	"Lemon" (with N.E.R.D.)	Best Collaboration	Nominated	
MTV Video Music Awards	2018	"Lemon" (with N.E.R.D.)	Best Editing	Won	
MTV Video Music Awards Japan	2006	"Pon de Replay"	Best New Artist	Won	
MTV Video Music Awards Japan	2007	"SOS"	Best Pop Video	Nominated	
MTV Video Music Awards Japan	2008	"Umbrella" (ft. Jay-Z)	Video of the Year	Nominated	
MTV Video Music Awards Japan	2009	"Live Your Life" (with T.I.)	Best Hip-Hop Video	Nominated	
MTV Video Music Awards Japan	2009	"Live Your Life" (with T.I.)	Best Collaboration	Nominated	
MTV Video Music Awards Japan	2010	"Russian Roulette"	Best Female Video	Nominated	
MTV Video Music Awards Japan	2011	"Only Girl (In the World)"	Best Female Video	Nominated	
MTV Video Music Awards Japan	2011	"Only Girl (In the World)"	Best R&B Video	Won	
MTV Video Music Awards Japan	2011	"Love the Way You Lie" (ft. Eminem)	Best Collaboration Video	Nominated	
MTV Video Music Awards Japan	2012	"We Found Love" (ft. Calvin Harris)	Best Female Video	Nominated	
MTV Video Music Awards Japan	2012	"We Found Love" (ft. Calvin Harris)	Best Pop Video	Nominated	
MTV Video Music Awards Japan	2013	"Diamonds"	Best Female Video	Nominated	
MTV Video Music Awards Japan	2013	"Diamonds"	Best R&B Video	Nominated	
MTV Video Music Awards Japan	2016	"Work" (ft. Drake)	Best Female Video – International	Nominated	
MTV Video Music Awards Japan	2016	Anti	Album of the Year – International	Nominated	
MTV Video Music Awards Japan	2016	This Is What You Came For (with Calvin Harris)	Best Dance Video	Nominated	
MTV Europe Music Awards	2005	Rihanna	Best New Act	Nominated	
MTV Europe Music Awards	2006	Rihanna	Best R&B	Won	
MTV Europe Music Awards	2006	"SOS"	Best Song	Nominated	
MTV Europe Music Awards	2007	Rihanna	Ultimate Urban	Won	
MTV Europe Music Awards	2007	Rihanna	Best Solo	Nominated	
MTV Europe Music Awards	2007	"Umbrella" (with Jay-Z)	Most Addictive Track	Nominated	
MTV Europe Music Awards	2008	Rihanna	Act of 2008	Nominated	
MTV Europe Music Awards	2010	"Rude Boy"	Best Song	Nominated	
MTV Europe Music Awards	2010	"Love the Way You Lie" (with Eminem)	Best Song	Nominated	
MTV Europe Music Awards	2010	"Love the Way You Lie" (with Eminem)	Best Video	Nominated	
MTV Europe Music Awards	2010	Rihanna	Best Female	Nominated	
MTV Europe Music Awards	2010	Rihanna	Best Pop	Nominated	
MTV Europe Music Awards	2011	Rihanna	Best Pop	Nominated	
MTV Europe Music Awards	2012	"We Found Love" (ft. Calvin Harris)	Best Video	Nominated	
MTV Europe Music Awards	2012	"We Found Love" (ft. Calvin Harris)	Best Song	Nominated	
MTV Europe Music Awards	2012	Rihanna	Best Female Artist	Nominated	
MTV Europe Music Awards	2012	Rihanna	Best Pop Artist	Nominated	
MTV Europe Music Awards	2012	Rihanna	Best Look	Nominated	
MTV Europe Music Awards	2012	Rihanna	Biggest Fans	Nominated	
MTV Europe Music Awards	2012	Rihanna	Worldwide Act	Nominated	
MTV Europe Music Awards	2012	Rihanna	Best North American Act	Won	
MTV Europe Music Awards	2013	"Diamonds"	Best Song	Nominated	
MTV Europe Music Awards	2013	Rihanna	Best Look	Nominated	
MTV Europe Music Awards	2014	"The Monster" (with Eminem)	Best Song	Nominated	
MTV Europe Music Awards	2015	Rihanna	Best Female	Won	
MTV Europe Music Awards	2016	Rihanna	Best Female	Nominated	
MTV Europe Music Awards	2016	Rihanna	Best Pop	Nominated	
MTV Europe Music Awards	2016	Rihanna	Best Look	Nominated	
MTV Europe Music Awards	2016	"Work" (ft. Drake)	Best Song	Nominated	
MTV Europe Music Awards	2017	"Wild Thoughts" (with DJ Khaled & Bryson Tiller)	Best Song	Nominated	
MTV Africa Music Awards	2008	Rihanna	Best R&B Artist	Nominated	
MTV Africa Music Awards	2010	Rihanna	Best International Artist	Nominated	
MTV Africa Music Awards	2014	Rihanna	Best International Artist	Nominated	
MTV Africa Music Awards	2016	Rihanna	Best International Artist	Nominated	
MTV Video Music Brasil	2012	Rihanna	Best International Artist	Nominated	
MTV Video Play Awards	2011	"Rude Boy"	Double Platinum	Won	
MTV Video Play Awards	2011	"Russian Roulette"	Platinum	Won	
MTV Video Play Awards	2011	"Love the Way You Lie" (with Eminem)	Double Platinum	Won	
MTV Video Play Awards	2012	"What's My Name?" (ft. Drake)	Double Platinum	Won	
MTV Video Play Awards	2012	"Who's That Chick?" (with David Guetta)	Platinum	Won	
MTV Video Play Awards	2013	"Princess of China" (with Coldplay)	Platinum	Won	
MTV Video Play Awards	2013	"We Found Love" (ft. Calvin Harris)	Double Platinum	Won	
MTV Video Play Awards	2013	"Where Have You Been"	Double Platinum	Won	
MTV O Music Awards	2011	Rihanna Navy	Fan Army FTW	Nominated	
MTV O Music Awards	2011	"Shy Ronnie 2: Ronnie & Clyde" (with The Lonely Island)	Funniest Music Short	Nominated	
MTV O Music Awards	2011	"F**K Yeah Rihanna"	F**K Yeah Tumblr	Nominated	
MTV O Music Awards	2011	"Catfight" (shared with Katy Perry)	Favorite Animated GIF	Nominated	
MTV Millennial Awards	2014	Rihanna	Celebrity without filter on Instagrammer	Nominated	
MTV Millennial Awards	2016	"Work" (ft. Drake)	International Hit of the Year	Won	
MTV Millennial Awards	2017	"This is What You Came For" (with Calvin Harris)	Collaboration of the Year	Nominated	
MTV Millennial Awards	2018	Rihanna	Global Instagrammer	Nominated	
MTV Italian Music Awards	2007	Rihanna	First Lady	Nominated	
MTV Italian Music Awards	2007	"Umbrella"	Best Number One of the Year	Nominated	
MTV Italian Music Awards	2011	Rihanna	Hot&Sexy Awards	Nominated	
MTV Italian Music Awards	2011	Rihanna	Too Much Awards	Nominated	
MTV Italian Music Awards	2011	Rihanna	Wonder Woman	Nominated	
MTV Italian Music Awards	2012	Rihanna	Wonder Woman	Nominated	
MTV Italian Music Awards	2013	Rihanna	Wonder Woman	Nominated	
MTV Italian Music Awards	2013	Rihanna	Instavip	Nominated	
MTV Italian Music Awards	2014	Rihanna	Best Look	Nominated	
MTV Italian Music Awards	2014	Rihanna	Artist Saga	Nominated	
MTV Italian Music Awards	2014	"Can't Remember to Forget You" (Shakira ft. Rihanna)	Best Video	Nominated	
MTV Italian Music Awards	2015	Rihanna	Best Look	Won	
MTV Italian Music Awards	2015	Rihanna	Artist Saga	Nominated	
MTV Italian Music Awards	2015	Rihanna	#MTVAwardsStar	Nominated	
MTV Italian Music Awards	2016	Rihanna	Best International Female	Nominated	
MTV Italian Music Awards	2016	Rihanna	Artist Saga	Nominated	
MTV Italian Music Awards	2016	Rihanna	#MTVAwardsStar	Nominated	
MTV Italian Music Awards	2017	Rihanna	Best Look and Smile	Won	
MTV Italian Music Awards	2017	Rihanna	Artist Saga	Nominated	
MTV Italian Music Awards	2017	Rihanna	#MTVAwardsStar	Nominated	
MuchMusic Video Awards	2006	"SOS"	International Video of the Year – Artist	Won	
MuchMusic Video Awards	2006	"SOS"	UR Fave International Artist/Group	Nominated	
MuchMusic Video Awards	2007	"Umbrella" (ft. Jay-Z)	International Video of the Year – Artist	Nominated	
MuchMusic Video Awards	2008	"Don't Stop the Music"	International Video of the Year – Artist	Won	
MuchMusic Video Awards	2008	"Umbrella" (ft. Jay-Z)	Most Watched Video	Won	
MuchMusic Video Awards	2008	"Don't Stop the Music"	UR Fave International Artist/Group	Nominated	
MuchMusic Video Awards	2009	"Live Your Life" (with T.I.)	International Video of the Year – Artist	Nominated	
MuchMusic Video Awards	2010	"Rude Boy"	International Video of the Year – Artist	Nominated	
MuchMusic Video Awards	2011	"Love the Way You Lie" (with Eminem)	Most Watched Video of the Year	Nominated	
MuchMusic Video Awards	2011	"Love the Way You Lie" (with Eminem)	International Video of the Year – Artist	Nominated	
MuchMusic Video Awards	2011	"Love the Way You Lie" (with Eminem)	UR Fave International Artist	Nominated	
MuchMusic Video Awards	2011	"Only Girl (In the World)"	International Video of the Year – Artist	Nominated	
MuchMusic Video Awards	2011	"Only Girl (In the World)"	Most Watched Video of the Year	Nominated	
MuchMusic Video Awards	2011	"Who's That Chick?" (with David Guetta)	International Video of the Year – Artist	Nominated	
MuchMusic Video Awards	2012	"We Found Love" (ft. Calvin Harris)	International Video of the Year – Artist	Nominated	
MuchMusic Video Awards	2012	"We Found Love" (ft. Calvin Harris)	UR Fave International Artist/Group	Nominated	
MuchMusic Video Awards	2012	"Take Care" (with Drake)	International Video of the Year by a Canadian	Nominated	
MuchMusic Video Awards	2013	"Diamonds"	International Video of the Year – Artist	Nominated	
MuchMusic Video Awards	2016	"Work" (ft. Drake)	iHeartRadio International Artist of the Year	Nominated	
MuchMusic Video Awards	2016	"Work" (ft. Drake)	Most Buzzworthy International Artist or Group	Nominated	
Myx Music Awards	2011	"Love the Way You Lie" (with Eminem)	Favorite International Video	Nominated	
Myx Music Awards	2013	"Right Now" (ft. David Guetta)	Favorite International Video	Nominated	
Myx Music Awards	2013	"Diamonds"	Favorite R&B Video	Won	
NAACP Image Awards	2008	"Umbrella" (ft. Jay-Z)	Outstanding Song	Nominated	
NAACP Image Awards	2009	Rihanna	Outstanding Female Artist	Nominated	
NAACP Image Awards	2010	Rihanna	Outstanding Female Artist	Nominated	
NAACP Image Awards	2010	"Run This Town" (with Jay-Z & Kanye West)	Outstanding Duo or Group	Nominated	
NAACP Image Awards	2011	Rihanna	Outstanding Female Artist	Nominated	
NAACP Image Awards	2011	"Love the Way You Lie" (with Eminem)	Outstanding Duo, Group or Collaboration	Nominated	
NAACP Image Awards	2018	"Loyalty" (with Kendrick Lamar)	Outstanding Duo, Group or Collaboration	Won	
NAACP Image Awards	2020	Rihanna	President's Award	Won	
NAACP Image Awards	2023	"Lift Me Up"	Outstanding Soul/R&B Song	Nominated	
NAACP Image Awards	2023	"Lift Me Up"	Outstanding Music Video	Won	
NME Awards	2008	Rihanna	Sexiest Woman	Nominated	
NRJ Music Awards	2007	Rihanna	International Revelation of the Year	Nominated	
NRJ Music Awards	2007	"Unfaithful"	Best International Song	Won	
NRJ Music Awards	2008	"Don't Stop the Music"	Best International Song	Won	
NRJ Music Awards	2008	Good Girl Gone Bad	Best International Album	Nominated	
NRJ Music Awards	2008	Rihanna	Best International Female	Nominated	
NRJ Music Awards	2009	"Disturbia"	Best International Song	Won	
NRJ Music Awards	2009	Rihanna	Best International Female	Nominated	
NRJ Music Awards	2010	Rihanna	Best International Female	Won	
NRJ Music Awards	2011	"Love the Way You Lie" (with Eminem)	Best International Song	Nominated	
NRJ Music Awards	2011	"Love the Way You Lie" (with Eminem)	Video of the Year	Nominated	
NRJ Music Awards	2011	Rihanna	Best International Female	Nominated	
NRJ Music Awards	2011	Rihanna & Eminem	Best International Duo	Nominated	
NRJ Music Awards	2012	Rihanna	Best International Female	Won	
NRJ Music Awards	2012	"We Found Love" (ft. Calvin Harris)	Best International Song	Nominated	
NRJ Music Awards	2013	Rihanna	Best International Female	Won	
NRJ Music Awards	2013	"Diamonds"	Best International Song	Nominated	
NRJ Music Awards	2013	"Where Have You Been"	Video of the Year	Nominated	
NRJ Music Awards	2013	Rihanna	Best International Female	Nominated	
NRJ Music Awards	2015	Rihanna	Best International Female	Nominated	
NRJ Music Awards	2016	Rihanna	Best International Female	Nominated	
NRJ Music Awards	2016	Rihanna & Calvin Harris	Best International Duo	Nominated	
NRJ Music Awards	2016	"Work" (ft. Drake)	Video of the Year	Nominated	
Nickelodeon Kids' Choice Awards	2009	Rihanna	Favorite Female Singer	Nominated	
Nickelodeon Kids' Choice Awards	2009	"Don't Stop the Music"	Favorite Song	Nominated	
Nickelodeon Kids' Choice Awards	2017	Rihanna	Favorite Female Singer	Nominated	
Nickelodeon Kids' Choice Awards	2019	Ocean's 8	Best Movie Actress	Nominated	
Nickelodeon Kids' Choice Awards	2023	Rihanna	Favorite Female Artist	Nominated	
Nickelodeon Kids' Choice Awards	2023	"Lift Me Up"	Favorite Song	Nominated	
Nickelodeon Australian Kids' Choice Awards	2006	Rihanna	Favorite International Artist	Nominated	
Nickelodeon Australian Kids' Choice Awards	2007	"Umbrella" (ft. Jay-Z)	Favorite Song	Nominated	
Nickelodeon Australian Kids' Choice Awards	2008	Rihanna	Favorite International Artist	Nominated	
Nickelodeon UK Kids' Choice Awards	2007	"Umbrella" (ft. Jay-Z)	MTV Hits Best Music Video	Nominated	
Premios Oye!	2013	"Diamonds"	English Song of the Year	Won	
People's Choice Awards	2008	"Shut Up and Drive"	Favorite R&B Song	Won	
People's Choice Awards	2009	Rihanna	Favorite Female Singer	Nominated	
People's Choice Awards	2009	"Disturbia"	Favorite Pop Song	Nominated	
People's Choice Awards	2009	"Take a Bow"	Favorite R&B Song	Nominated	
People's Choice Awards	2010	"Run This Town" (with Jay-Z & Kanye West)	Favorite Music Collaboration	Won	
People's Choice Awards	2010	"Live Your Life" (with T.I.)	Favorite Music Collaboration	Nominated	
People's Choice Awards	2011	Rihanna	Favorite Pop Artist	Won	
People's Choice Awards	2011	"Love the Way You Lie" (with Eminem)	Favorite Music Video	Won	
People's Choice Awards	2011	"Love the Way You Lie" (with Eminem)	Favorite Song	Won	
People's Choice Awards	2012	Rihanna	Favorite Pop Artist	Nominated	
People's Choice Awards	2012	Rihanna	Favorite R&B Artist	Won	
People's Choice Awards	2013	Rihanna	Favorite R&B Artist	Won	
People's Choice Awards	2014	Rihanna	Favorite R&B Artist	Nominated	
People's Choice Awards	2015	Rihanna	Favorite Animated Movie Voice	Nominated	
People's Choice Awards	2017	Rihanna	Favorite Female Singer	Nominated	
People's Choice Awards	2017	Rihanna	Favorite R&B Artist	Won	
People's Choice Awards	2017	"Work"	Favorite Song	Nominated	
People's Choice Awards	2017	Anti	Favorite Album	Nominated	
People's Choice Awards	2019	Rihanna	The Style Star of 2019	Nominated	
People's Choice Awards	2020	Rihanna	The Style Star of 2020	Nominated	
Primetime Emmy Awards	2023	Super Bowl LVII Halftime Show Starring Rihanna	Outstanding Variety Special (Live)	Nominated	
Radio Disney Music Awards	2006	Rihanna	Best Female Singer	Nominated	
Radio Disney Music Awards	2006	"SOS"	Best Song	Nominated	
Radio Disney Music Awards	2017	"Work" (ft. Drake)	Best Song to Lip Sync to	Won	
Satellite Awards	2023	"Lift Me Up"	Best Original Song	Nominated	
Soul Train Music Awards	2010	"Love the Way You Lie" (with Eminem)	Best Hip-Hop Song of the Year	Won	
Soul Train Music Awards	2010	"Rude Boy"	Best R&B Song	Nominated	
Soul Train Music Awards	2011	"Man Down"	Best Caribbean Performance	Won	
Soul Train Music Awards	2011	"Only Girl (In the World)"/"What's My Name?"	Best Dance Performance	Nominated	
Soul Train Music Awards	2011	"All of the Lights" (with Kanye West)	Best Hip-Hop Song of the Year	Nominated	
Soul Train Music Awards	2012	"Where Have You Been"	Best Dance Performance	Nominated	
Soul Train Music Awards	2015	"Bitch Better Have My Money"	Song of the Year	Nominated	
Soul Train Music Awards	2016	Rihanna	Best R&B/Soul Female Artist	Nominated	
Soul Train Music Awards	2016	"Work" (ft. Drake)	Best Collaboration	Nominated	
Soul Train Music Awards	2016	"Work" (ft. Drake)	Best Dance Performance	Nominated	
Soul Train Music Awards	2016	"Work" (ft. Drake)	Song of the Year	Nominated	
Soul Train Music Awards	2016	"Work" (ft. Drake)	Video of the Year	Nominated	
Soul Train Music Awards	2016	"Needed Me"	The Ashford & Simpson's Songwriting Award	Nominated	
Soul Train Music Awards	2016	Anti	Album/Mixtape of the Year	Nominated	
Soul Train Music Awards	2017	"Wild Thoughts" (with DJ Khaled & Bryson Tiller)	Video of the Year	Nominated	
Soul Train Music Awards	2017	"Wild Thoughts" (with DJ Khaled & Bryson Tiller)	Best Hip-Hop Song of the Year	Nominated	
Soul Train Music Awards	2017	"Wild Thoughts" (with DJ Khaled & Bryson Tiller)	Song of the Year	Nominated	
Soul Train Music Awards	2017	"Wild Thoughts" (with DJ Khaled & Bryson Tiller)	Best Dance Performance	Nominated	
Soul Train Music Awards	2017	"Wild Thoughts" (with DJ Khaled & Bryson Tiller)	Best Collaboration	Won	
Swiss Music Awards	2008	"Umbrella" (ft. Jay-Z)	International Song	Won	
Teen Choice Awards	2005	Pon de Replay	Choice: Summer Song	Nominated	
Teen Choice Awards	2006	Rihanna	Choice Music: R&B Artist	Won	
Teen Choice Awards	2006	Rihanna	Choice Music: Breakout Artist Female	Won	
Teen Choice Awards	2006	Rihanna	Choice Miscellaneous: Female Hottie	Nominated	
Teen Choice Awards	2006	Rihanna	Choice: Female Artist	Nominated	
Teen Choice Awards	2006	Rihanna	Choice: V Cast Artist	Nominated	
Teen Choice Awards	2006	"SOS"	Choice: Music Single	Nominated	
Teen Choice Awards	2006	"Unfaithful"	Choice: Summer Song	Nominated	
Teen Choice Awards	2007	Rihanna	Choice Music: R&B Artist	Won	
Teen Choice Awards	2007	Rihanna	Choice Female Hottie	Nominated	
Teen Choice Awards	2007	Rihanna	Choice Music: Female Artist	Nominated	
Teen Choice Awards	2007	Rihanna	Choice Music: Summer Artist	Nominated	
Teen Choice Awards	2007	"Umbrella" (with Jay-Z)	Choice Music: Single	Nominated	
Teen Choice Awards	2007	"Shut Up And Drive"	Choice Music: Song of the Summer	Nominated	
Teen Choice Awards	2008	Rihanna	Choice Music: R&B Artist	Nominated	
Teen Choice Awards	2008	Rihanna	Choice Female Hottie	Nominated	
Teen Choice Awards	2008	Rihanna	Choice Music: Female Artist	Nominated	
Teen Choice Awards	2008	"Don't Stop the Music"	Choice Music: Single	Nominated	
Teen Choice Awards	2009	"Live Your Life" (with T.I.)	Choice Music: Hook Up	Nominated	
Teen Choice Awards	2010	"Love the Way You Lie" (with Eminem)	Choice Music: Rap/Hip-Hop Track	Won	
Teen Choice Awards	2010	Rihanna	Choice Music: R&B Artist	Nominated	
Teen Choice Awards	2010	Rated R	Choice Album R&B	Nominated	
Teen Choice Awards	2010	Rihanna	Choice Summer: Summer Music Star – Female	Nominated	
Teen Choice Awards	2011	Rihanna	Choice Music: Female Artist	Nominated	
Teen Choice Awards	2011	"All of the Lights" (with Kanye West)	Choice Music: R&B/Hip-Hop Track	Nominated	
Teen Choice Awards	2012	Rihanna	Choice Music: Female Artist	Nominated	
Teen Choice Awards	2012	Rihanna	Choice Fashion: Female Hottie	Nominated	
Teen Choice Awards	2012	Rihanna	Choice Music: Summer Music Star: Female	Nominated	
Teen Choice Awards	2012	Rihanna	Choice Movie: Breakout Female (for Battleship)	Won	
Teen Choice Awards	2012	"Take Care" (with Drake)	Choice Music: Male Single	Nominated	
Teen Choice Awards	2012	"Take Care" (with Drake)	Choice Music: R&B/Hip-Hop Track	Nominated	
Teen Choice Awards	2013	Rihanna	Choice Music: Female Artist	Nominated	
Teen Choice Awards	2013	Rihanna	Choice Music: Summer Music Star Female	Nominated	
Teen Choice Awards	2013	Rihanna	Choice Other: Twitter Personality	Nominated	
Teen Choice Awards	2013	"Stay"	Choice Music: Break-Up Song	Nominated	
Teen Choice Awards	2013	"Diamonds"	Choice Music: R&B/Hip- Hop Song	Nominated	
Teen Choice Awards	2014	Rihanna	Choice Fashion: Female Hottie	Nominated	
Teen Choice Awards	2014	Rihanna	Choice Web: Social Media Queen	Nominated	
Teen Choice Awards	2014	Rihanna	Choice Web: Instagrammer	Nominated	
Teen Choice Awards	2015	Rihanna	Choice Music: Female Artist	Nominated	
Teen Choice Awards	2015	Rihanna	Choice Fashion: Female Hottie	Nominated	
Teen Choice Awards	2015	Rihanna	Choice Music: Summer Star: Female	Nominated	
Teen Choice Awards	2015	Rihanna	Choice Other: Selfie Taker	Nominated	
Teen Choice Awards	2015	"Bitch Better Have My Money"	Choice Music: R&B/Hip-Hop Song	Nominated	
Teen Choice Awards	2015	"Bitch Better Have My Money"	Choice Music: Party Song	Nominated	
Teen Choice Awards	2015	"FourFiveSeconds"	Choice Music: R&B/Hip-Hop Song	Nominated	
Teen Choice Awards	2016	Rihanna	Choice Music: Female Artist	Nominated	
Teen Choice Awards	2016	Rihanna	Choice Summer Music Star: Female	Nominated	
Teen Choice Awards	2016	"Work"	Choice Music: R&B/Hip-Hop Song	Nominated	
Teen Choice Awards	2016	"This Is What You Came For"	Choice Music: Party Song	Nominated	
Teen Choice Awards	2016	"This Is What You Came For"	Choice Music: Summer Song	Nominated	
Teen Choice Awards	2018	Rihanna	Choice Music: R&B/Hip-Hop Artist	Nominated	
Teen Choice Awards	2018	Rihanna	Choice Music: Best Female Artist	Nominated	
Teen Choice Awards	2018	Rihanna	Choice Music: Best Fandom RihannaNavy	Nominated	
Teen Choice Awards	2018	Rihanna	Choice Fashion: Female Hottie	Nominated	
Teen Choice Awards	2018	Rihanna	Choice Fashion: Choice Style Icon	Nominated	
Telehit Awards	2012	"We Found Love" (ft. Calvin Harris)	Song of the Year	Won	
Telehit Awards	2012	"We Found Love" (ft. Calvin Harris)	Video of the Year	Nominated	
Telehit Awards	2016	Rihanna	Best Female Solo Artist	Won	
Telehit Awards	2016	"Work" (ft. Drake)	Song of the Year	Nominated	
The Radio Academy Honours	2008	Rihanna	Most Played Artist on British Radio	Won	
The Radio Academy Honours	2012	Rihanna	Most Played Artist on British Radio	Won	
4Music Video Honours	2011	Rihanna	Best Girl	Won	
4Music Video Honours	2011	"California King Bed"	Best Video	Nominated	
4Music Video Honours	2011	"What's My Name?" (with Drake)	Best Video	Nominated	
4Music Video Honours	2011	"Who's That Chick?" (with David Guetta)	Best Video	Nominated	
4Music Video Honours	2012	Rihanna	Best Girl	Nominated	
4Music Video Honours	2012	"Princess of China" (with Coldplay)	Best Video	Nominated	
4Music Video Honours	2012	"Where Have You Been" (with Calvin Harris)	Best Video	Nominated	
4Music Video Honours	2012	"Take Care" (with Drake)	Best Video	Nominated	
Urban Music Awards	2007	"Unfaithful"	Best Music Video	Nominated	
Urban Music Awards	2007	Rihanna	Best R&B Act	Won	
Urban Music Awards	2009	"Rehab"	Best Music Video	Won	
Urban Music Awards	2009	Rihanna	Best Female Act	Won	
Urban Music Awards	2009	Rihanna	Best R&B Act	Nominated	
Urban Music Awards	2009	Rihanna	Artist of the Year	Nominated	
Urban Music Awards	2010	Rihanna	Best International Artist	Nominated	
Urban Music Awards	2012	Unapologetic	Album of the year	Won	
UK Festival Awards	2016	Rihanna (V Festival)	Best Headline Performance	Nominated	
UK Music Video Awards	2011	"Love the Way You Lie" (with Eminem)	Best Urban Video – International	Nominated	
UK Music Video Awards	2012	"We Found Love" (ft. Calvin Harris)	Best Pop Video – International	Nominated	
UK Music Video Awards	2015	"Bitch Better Have My Money"	Best Pop Video – International	Won	
UK Music Video Awards	2015	"Bitch Better Have My Money"	Best Styling in a Video	Won	
UK Music Video Awards	2016	"This Is What You Came For" (ft. Calvin Harris)	Best Dance Video – UK	Nominated	
UK Music Video Awards	2018	"Lemon" (ft. N.E.R.D.)	Best Choreography in a Video	Nominated	
VH1 Soul VIBE Awards	2007	"Umbrella" (ft. Jay-Z)	Video of the Year	Won	
WDM Radio Awards	2017	"This Is What You Came For" (with Calvin Harris)	Best Global Track	Won	
Webby Awards	2016	ANTIdiaRy	Mobile Campaign	Won	
Webby Awards	2016	ANTIdiaRy	Best Use of Video or Moving Image	Won	
World Music Awards	2006	Rihanna	World's Best-Selling Barbadian Artist	Won	
World Music Awards	2006	Rihanna	World's Best Selling R&B Artist	Nominated	
World Music Awards	2007	Rihanna	World's Best Entertainer of the Year	Won	
World Music Awards	2007	Rihanna	World's Best-Selling Pop Female Artist	Won	
World Music Awards	2007	Rihanna	World's Best-Selling R&B Female Artist	Won	
World Music Awards	2008	Rihanna	World's Best-Selling R&B Female Artist	Nominated	
World Music Awards	2008	Rihanna	World's Best-Selling Barbadian Artist	Won	
World Music Awards	2010	Rihanna	World's Best Pop/Rock Artist	Nominated	
World Music Awards	2010	Rihanna	World's Best song	Nominated	
World Music Awards	2014	Rihanna	World's Best Female Artist	Nominated	
World Music Awards	2014	Rihanna	World's Best Live Act	Nominated	
World Music Awards	2014	Rihanna	World's Best Entertainer of the Year	Nominated	
World Music Awards	2014	Rihanna	World's song of the Year	Nominated	
World Music Awards	2014	Rihanna	World's best video	Nominated	
YouTube Music Awards	2013	Rihanna	Artist of the Year	Nominated	
YouTube Music Awards	2013	"Diamonds"	YouTube Phenomenon	Nominated	
YouTube Music Awards	2015	Rihanna	50 Artists to Watch	Won	

== Other accolades ==
=== State and international honors ===
Name of country, year given, and name of honor
Country	Year	Honor	Ref.
United States	2017	Harvard Foundation for Interracial & Cultural Relations Humanitarian of the Year	
United States	2026	Edison Achievement Award	

=== World records ===
List of world records achieved by Rihanna
Publication	Year	World record	R. status	Ref.
Guinness World Records	2010	Female Artist with the Most U.S. Number-one Singles in a Year	Record	
Guinness World Records	2010	Most Digital Number-one Singles in the US	Record	
Guinness World Records	2011	Most Consecutive Years of UK No.1 Singles	Record	
Guinness World Records	2012	The Best Selling Digital Artist (US)	Record	
Guinness World Records	2013	Most Consecutive Weeks on UK Singles Chart (Multiple Singles)	Record	
Guinness World Records	2014	Most "Liked" Person on Facebook	Record	
