= IHeartRadio Music Award for Male Artist of the Year =

Music award category

iHeartRadio Music Award for Male Artist of the Year
- Country: United States
- Presented by: iHeartRadio
- First award: 2016

Highlights
- Most wins: Justin Bieber (2)
- Most nominations: Ed Sheeran; The Weeknd (5 each)

The iHeartRadio Music Award for Male Artist of the Year is one of the former awards handed out at the yearly iHeartRadio Music Awards. It was first awarded in 2016 and presented to Justin Bieber. In 2023, it was discontinued and replaced by the all-gender category Artist of the Year. Bieber is the most awarded artist in this category, with a total of two wins. Ed Sheeran and the Weeknd are the most nominated artists in this category, with a total of five nominations each.

== Winners and nominees ==
Year (Note: Each year is linked to the article about the iHeartRadio Music Awards held that year.)	Winner(s)	Nominees	Ref.
2016	Justin Bieber	Luke Bryan; Ed Sheeran; Sam Smith; The Weeknd	
2017	Justin Bieber	Luke Bryan; Drake; Shawn Mendes; The Weeknd	
2018	Ed Sheeran	Bruno Mars; Shawn Mendes; Charlie Puth; The Weeknd	
2019	Drake	Ed Sheeran; Kendrick Lamar; Post Malone; Shawn Mendes	
2020	Post Malone	Ed Sheeran; Khalid; Luke Combs; Shawn Mendes	
2021	The Weeknd	Harry Styles; Justin Bieber; Post Malone; Roddy Ricch	
2022	Lil Nas X	Justin Bieber; Drake; Ed Sheeran; The Weeknd	

== Statistics ==
=== Artists with multiple wins ===
2 wins

- Justin Bieber

=== Artists with multiple nominations ===
5 nominations

- Ed Sheeran
- The Weeknd

4 nominations

- Justin Bieber
- Shawn Mendes

3 nominations

- Drake
- Post Malone

2 nominations

- Luke Bryan
