= IHeartRadio Music Award for Artist of the Year =

Annual music award from iHeartRadio

iHeartRadio Music Award for Artist of the Year
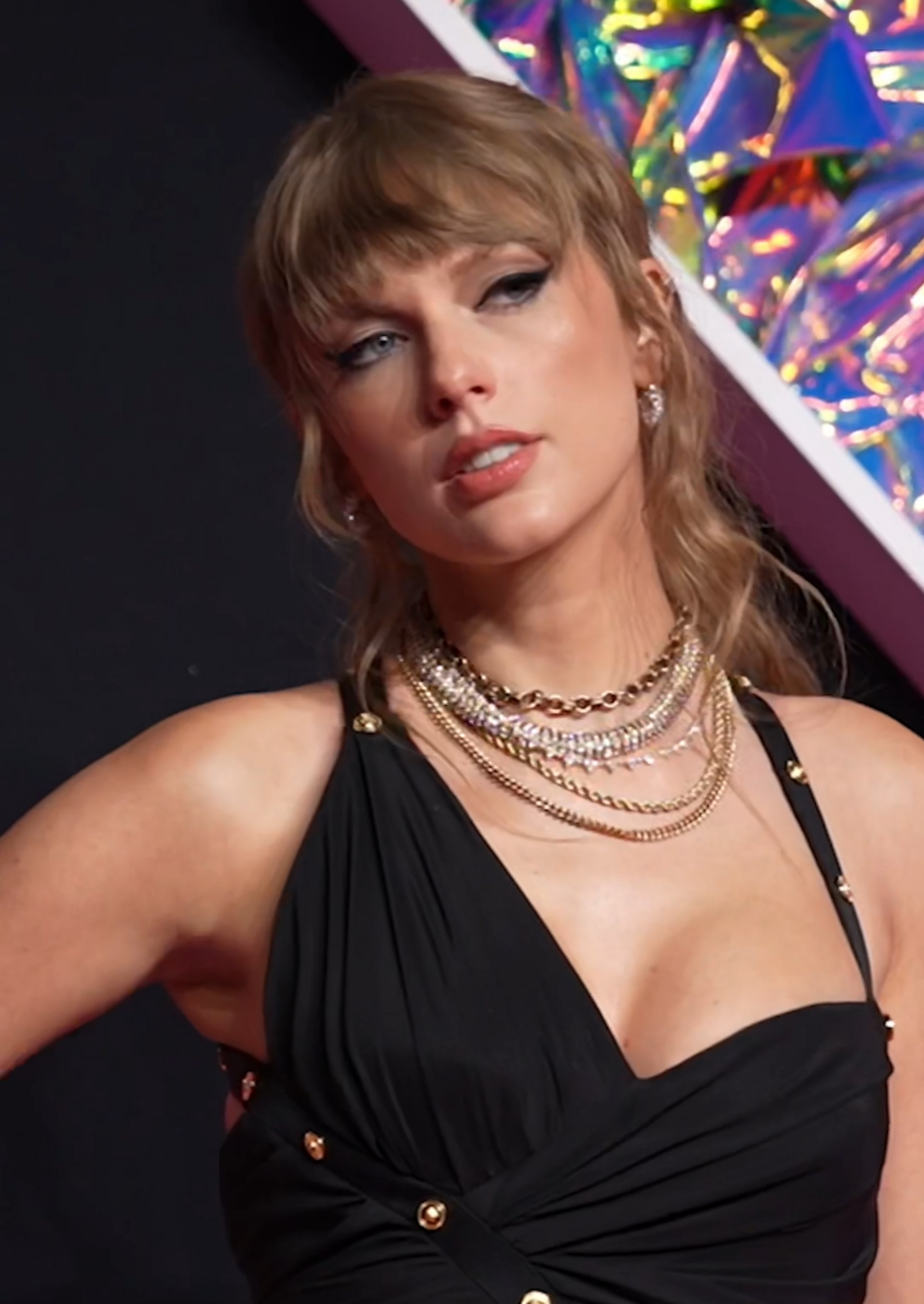
- Taylor Swift is the most awarded artist in this category, with a total of seven wins and the most nominated artist, with a total of nine nominations
- Country: United States
- Presented by: iHeartRadio
- First award: 2014
- Currently held by: Taylor Swift

Highlights
- Most wins: Taylor Swift (4)
- Most nominations: Taylor Swift (5)

The iHeartRadio Music Award for Artist of the Year is one of the awards handed out at the yearly iHeartRadio Music Awards. It was first awarded in 2014 and presented to Rihanna. Between 2016 and 2022, it was replaced by the gender-specific categories Male Artist of the Year and Female Artist of the Year. However, in 2023, those categories were retired and the overall award was reinstated again. Taylor Swift is the most awarded artist in this category, with a total of seven wins and the most nominated artist, with a total of nine nominations.

== Winners and nominees ==
Year (Note: Each year is linked to the article about the iHeartRadio Music Awards held that year.)	Winner(s)	Nominees	Ref.
2014	Rihanna	Imagine Dragons; Justin Timberlake; Macklemore & Ryan Lewis; Maroon 5	
2015	Taylor Swift	Iggy Azalea; Luke Bryan; Ariana Grande; Sam Smith	
2016 – 2022	—N/a		
2023	Harry Styles	Beyoncé; Doja Cat; Drake; Dua Lipa; Jack Harlow; Justin Bieber; Lizzo; Taylor Swift; The Weeknd	
2024	Taylor Swift	Drake; Jelly Roll; Luke Combs; Miley Cyrus; Morgan Wallen; Olivia Rodrigo; Shakira; SZA; Usher	
2025	Taylor Swift	Billie Eilish; Doja Cat; Jelly Roll; Kendrick Lamar; Morgan Wallen; Post Malone; Sabrina Carpenter; SZA; Teddy Swims	
2026	Taylor Swift	Bad Bunny; Benson Boone; Chris Brown; Jelly Roll; Kendrick Lamar; Lady Gaga; Morgan Wallen; Sabrina Carpenter; Tate McRae	

== Statistics ==
=== Artists with multiple wins ===
4 wins

- Taylor Swift

=== Artists with multiple nominations ===
5 nominations

- Taylor Swift

3 nominations

- Morgan Wallen

2 nominations

- Sabrina Carpenter
- Drake
- Kendrick Lamar
- Jelly Roll
- SZA
