= IHeartRadio Music Award for Female Artist of the Year =

Music award category

iHeartRadio Music Award for Female Artist of the Year
- Country: United States
- Presented by: iHeartRadio
- First award: 2016

Highlights
- Most wins: Taylor Swift (2)
- Most nominations: Taylor Swift; Ariana Grande (5 each)

The iHeartRadio Music Award for Female Artist of the Year is one of the former awards handed out at the yearly iHeartRadio Music Awards. It was first awarded in 2016 and presented to Taylor Swift. In 2023, it was discontinued and replaced by the all-gender category Artist of the Year. Swift is the most awarded artist in this category, with a total of two wins. Swift and Ariana Grande are the most nominated artists in this category, with a total of five nominations each.

== Winners and nominees ==
Year (Note: Each year is linked to the article about the iHeartRadio Music Awards held that year.)	Winner(s)	Nominees	Ref.
2016	Taylor Swift	Adele; Selena Gomez; Meghan Trainor; Carrie Underwood	
2017	Adele	Selena Gomez; Ariana Grande; Rihanna; Sia	
2018	Taylor Swift	Alessia Cara; Rihanna; Halsey; Pink	
2019	Ariana Grande	Camila Cabello; Cardi B; Halsey; Dua Lipa	
2020	Billie Eilish	Ariana Grande; Halsey; Lizzo; Taylor Swift	
2021	Dua Lipa	Ariana Grande; Billie Eilish; Megan Thee Stallion; Taylor Swift	
2022	Olivia Rodrigo	Ariana Grande; Doja Cat; Dua Lipa; Taylor Swift	

== Statistics ==
=== Artists with multiple wins ===
2 wins

- Taylor Swift

=== Artists with multiple nominations ===
5 nominations

- Taylor Swift
- Ariana Grande

3 nominations

- Halsey
- Dua Lipa

2 nominations

- Adele
- Billie Eilish
- Selena Gomez
- Rihanna

== See also ==
- List of music awards honoring women
